= 2024–25 3. Liga =

3. Liga
- Season: 2024–25
- Dates: 2 August 2024 – 17 May 2025
- Champions: Arminia Bielefeld (2nd title)
- Promoted: Dynamo Dresden; Arminia Bielefeld
- Relegated: Borussia Dortmund II; Hannover 96 II; SV Sandhausen; SpVgg Unterhaching
- Matches: 380
- Goals: 1,103 (2.9 per match)
- Top goalscorer: Fatih Kaya (20 goals)
- Biggest home win: Mannheim 5–0 Rostock
- Biggest away win: Wiesbaden 1–5 Hannover; Hannover 0–4 Ingolstadt; Munich 0–4 Verl
- Highest scoring: Sandhausen 4–6 Aue
- Longest winning run: 5 games Cologne
- Longest unbeaten run: 9 games Sandhausen
- Longest winless run: 19 games Unterhaching
- Longest losing run: 6 games Sandhausen
- Highest attendance: 31,858; Dresden v Aue
- Lowest attendance: 650; Stuttgart v Unterhaching; Stuttgart v Cologne
- Attendance: 4,394,605 (11,565 per match)

The 2024–25 3. Liga was the 17th season of the 3. Liga. It started on 2 August 2024 and concluded on 17 May 2025.

The fixtures were announced on 9 July 2024.

== Teams ==
Locations of the 2024–25 3. Liga teams

=== Team changes ===
Promoted from 2023–24 Regionalliga	Relegated from 2023–24 2. Bundesliga	Promoted to 2024–25 2. Bundesliga	Relegated from 2023–24 3. Liga
Alemannia Aachen; Energie Cottbus; Hannover 96 II; VfB Stuttgart II	Hansa Rostock; VfL Osnabrück; Wehen Wiesbaden	SSV Ulm; Preußen Münster; Jahn Regensburg	Hallescher FC; MSV Duisburg; VfB Lübeck; SC Freiburg II

=== Stadiums and locations ===
Team	Location	Stadium	Capacity
Alemannia Aachen	Aachen	Tivoli	32,960
Erzgebirge Aue	Aue-Bad Schlema	Erzgebirgsstadion	16,485
Arminia Bielefeld	Bielefeld	Schüco-Arena	27,332
Energie Cottbus	Cottbus	LEAG Energie Stadion	22,528
Borussia Dortmund II	Dortmund	Stadion Rote Erde	9,999
Dynamo Dresden	Dresden	Rudolf-Harbig-Stadion	32,249
Rot-Weiss Essen	Essen	Stadion an der Hafenstraße	19,962
Hannover 96 II	Hanover	Eilenriedestadion; Heinz von Heiden Arena	5,001; 49,000
FC Ingolstadt	Ingolstadt	Audi Sportpark	15,200
Viktoria Köln	Cologne	Sportpark Höhenberg	8,343
Waldhof Mannheim	Mannheim	Carl-Benz-Stadion	24,302
1860 Munich	Munich	Grünwalder Stadion	15,000
VfL Osnabrück	Osnabrück	Stadion an der Bremer Brücke	15,741
Hansa Rostock	Rostock	Ostseestadion	29,000
1. FC Saarbrücken	Saarbrücken	Ludwigsparkstadion	16,003
SV Sandhausen	Sandhausen	GP Stadion am Hardtwald	15,414
VfB Stuttgart II	Aspach	WIRmachenDRUCK Arena^{1}	10,001
SpVgg Unterhaching	Unterhaching	Sportpark Unterhaching	15,053
SC Verl	Verl	Sportclub Arena	5,207
Wehen Wiesbaden	Wiesbaden	BRITA-Arena	15,295

^{1} VfB Stuttgart II played their home matches at the WIRmachenDRUCK Arena since their home stadium, the Robert-Schlienz-Stadion in Stuttgart, did not meet 3. Liga standards.

=== Personnel and kits ===
Team	Manager	Captain	Kit manufacturer	Shirt sponsor		
Team	Manager	Captain	Kit manufacturer	Front	Sleeve	Back
Alemannia Aachen	(Germany) Heiner Backhaus	(Germany) Mika Hanraths	Capelli Sport	None	Rotcom	Gebr. Kutsch
Erzgebirge Aue	(Germany) Jens Härtel	(Germany) Martin Männel	Nike	Medical Beauty Research	Erzgebirgssparkasse	G&K Innenausbau
Arminia Bielefeld	(Germany) Michél Kniat	(United States) Mael Corboz	Macron	Schüco	Danne Holding, Bethel Foundation	holz4home
Energie Cottbus	(Germany) Claus-Dieter Wollitz	(Germany) Axel Borgmann	Macron	LEAG	Sparkasse Spree-Neiße	Koalick
Borussia Dortmund II	(Denmark) Mike Tullberg	(Morocco) Ayman Azhil	Puma	1&1	None	None
Dynamo Dresden	(Switzerland) Thomas Stamm	(Germany) Stefan Kutschke	Jako	ALL-INKL.COM	ad hoc Gruppe	Pfennigpfeiffer
Rot-Weiss Essen	(Germany) Uwe Koschinat	(Germany) Michael Schultz	Jako	ifm Electronic	Sparkasse Essen, Essener Chancen	NEObetNEO.bet
Hannover 96 II	(Germany) Daniel Stendel	(Germany) Fynn Arkenberg	Macron	Heise	Sparkasse Hannover	Gilde Brauerei
FC Ingolstadt	(Germany) Sabrina Wittmann	(Germany) Lukas Fröde	Erreà	SI Electronics	Audi Schanzer Fußballschule	PROSIS GmbH
Viktoria Köln	(Germany) Olaf Janßen	(Germany) Christoph Greger	Capelli Sport	Peynooş	Wintec Autoglas	ETL
Waldhof Mannheim	(Germany) Dominik Glawogger	(Germany) Marcel Seegert	Uhlsport	Galeria	None	PLAZA Hotelgroup
1860 Munich	(Germany) Patrick Glöckner	(Netherlands) Jesper Verlaat	Nike	Die Bayerische	Bet3000	Pangea Life
VfL Osnabrück	(Germany) Marco Antwerpen	(Germany) Timo Beermann	Capelli Sport	SO-TECH	JOPA	None
Hansa Rostock	(Germany) Daniel Brinkmann	(Germany) Franz Pfanne	Mizuno	28 Black	H2Apex	None
1. FC Saarbrücken	(Germany) Alois Schwartz	(Germany) Manuel Zeitz	Adidas	Victor's Group	LOTTO Saartoto	Victor's Group
SV Sandhausen	(Germany) Gerhard Kleppinger / (Germany) Dennis Diekmeier	(Germany) Jakob Lewald	Macron	Weingut Reichsrat von Buhl	Goelz Paletten, HCM SSC	L-VIP
VfB Stuttgart II	(Germany) Markus Fiedler	(Germany) Dominik Nothnagel	Jako	Landesbank Baden-Württemberg	Porsche	None
SpVgg Unterhaching	(Germany) Sven Bender	(Germany) Markus Schwabl	Uhlsport	Alpenbauer	Lupse & Lupse	None
SC Verl	(Germany) Alexander Ende	(Germany) Fabio Gruber	Joma	Beckhoff	EGE GmbH	None
Wehen Wiesbaden	(Germany) Nils Döring	(Germany) Florian Stritzel	Capelli Sport	Brita	quickpaid	None

=== Managerial changes ===
Team	Outgoing	Manner	Exit date		Position in table	Incoming	Incoming date		Ref.
Team	Outgoing	Manner	Announced on	Departs on	Position in table	Incoming	Announced on	Arrived on	Ref.
Dynamo Dresden	(Germany) Heiko Scholz (interim)	End of caretaker	20 April 2024	30 June 2024	Pre-season	(Switzerland) Thomas Stamm	19 May 2024	1 July 2024	
Wehen Wiesbaden	(Germany) Nils Döring (interim)	End of caretaker	28 April 2024	30 June 2024	Pre-season	(Germany) Nils Döring	19 June 2024	1 July 2024	
FC Ingolstadt	(Germany) Sabrina Wittmann (interim)	End of caretaker	2 May 2024	30 June 2024	Pre-season	(Germany) Sabrina Wittmann	5 June 2024	1 July 2024	
SV Sandhausen	(Germany) Gerhard Kleppinger (interim)	End of caretaker	13 May 2024	30 June 2024	Pre-season	(Serbia) Sreto Ristić	24 May 2024	1 July 2024	
Hansa Rostock	(Bosnia and Herzegovina) Mersad Selimbegović	End of contract	23 May 2024	30 June 2024	Pre-season	(Germany) Bernd Hollerbach	29 May 2024	1 July 2024	
Waldhof Mannheim	(Germany) Marco Antwerpen	Sacked	17 September 2024		20th	(Germany) Bernhard Trares	18 September 2024		
VfL Osnabrück	(Germany) Uwe Koschinat	Sacked	22 September 2024		16th	(Germany) Pit Reimers	25 September 2024		
Hansa Rostock	(Germany) Bernd Hollerbach	Sacked	24 October 2024		18th	(Germany) Simon Pesch / (Germany) Marcus Rabenhorst (interim)	24 October 2024		
Hansa Rostock	(Germany) Simon Pesch / (Germany) Marcus Rabenhorst (interim)	End of caretaker	2 November 2024		12th	(Germany) Daniel Brinkmann	2 November 2024		
Erzgebirge Aue	(Bulgaria) Pavel Dochev	Sacked	1 December 2024		8th	(Germany) Jörg Emmerich / (Croatia) Adam Sušac (interim)	1 December 2024		
SpVgg Unterhaching	(Germany) Marc Unterberger	Sacked	1 December 2024		19th	(Germany) Sven Bender (interim)	1 December 2024		
Rot-Weiss Essen	(Germany) Christoph Dabrowski	Sacked	9 December 2024		18th	(Germany) Uwe Koschinat	12 December 2024		
VfL Osnabrück	(Germany) Pit Reimers	Sacked	10 December 2024		20th	(Germany) Marco Antwerpen	12 December 2024		
Erzgebirge Aue	(Germany) Jörg Emmerich / (Croatia) Adam Sušac (interim)	End of caretaker	11 December 2024	1 January 2025	7th	(Germany) Jens Härtel	11 December 2024	2 January 2025	
SV Sandhausen	(Serbia) Sreto Ristić	Sacked	22 December 2024		10th	(Turkey) Kenan Koçak	28 December 2024	2 January 2025	
SpVgg Unterhaching	(Germany) Sven Bender (interim)	End of caretaker	3 January 2025		20th	(Germany) Heiko Herrlich	3 January 2025		
1860 Munich	(Greece) Argiris Giannikis	Sacked	20 January 2025		14th	(Germany) Patrick Glöckner	20 January 2025		
SpVgg Unterhaching	(Germany) Heiko Herrlich	Sacked	21 March 2025		20th	(Germany) Sven Bender (interim)	28 March 2025		
SV Sandhausen	(Turkey) Kenan Koçak	Resigned	6 April 2025		18th	(Germany) Gerhard Kleppinger / (Germany) Dennis Diekmeier (interim)	6 April 2025		
Waldhof Mannheim	(Germany) Bernhard Trares	Sacked	9 April 2025		16th	(Austria) Dominik Glawogger	10 April 2025		
1. FC Saarbrücken	(Germany) Rüdiger Ziehl	Moved to manager	22 April 2025		4th	(Germany) Alois Schwartz	22 April 2025		
Borussia Dortmund II	(Germany) Jan Zimmermann	Sacked	5 May 2025		17th	(Denmark) Mike Tullberg	5 May 2025		

== League table ==
Pos	Team	Pld	W	D	L	GF	GA	GD	Pts	Promotion, qualification or relegation
1	Arminia Bielefeld (C, P)	38	21	9	8	64	36	+28	72	Promotion to 2. Bundesliga and qualification for DFB-Pokal
2	Dynamo Dresden (P)	38	20	10	8	71	40	+31	70	Promotion to 2. Bundesliga and qualification for DFB-Pokal
3	1. FC Saarbrücken	38	18	11	9	59	47	+12	65	Qualification for promotion play-offs and DFB-Pokal
4	Energie Cottbus	38	18	8	12	64	54	+10	62	Qualification for DFB-Pokal
5	Hansa Rostock	38	18	6	14	54	46	+8	60	
6	Viktoria Köln	38	18	5	15	59	48	+11	59	
7	SC Verl	38	15	12	11	62	55	+7	57	
8	Rot-Weiss Essen	38	16	8	14	55	54	+1	56	
9	Wehen Wiesbaden	38	15	10	13	59	60	−1	55	
10	FC Ingolstadt	38	14	12	12	72	63	+9	54	
11	1860 Munich	38	15	8	15	57	61	−4	53	
12	Alemannia Aachen	38	12	14	12	44	44	0	50	
13	Erzgebirge Aue	38	15	5	18	52	65	−13	50	
14	VfL Osnabrück	38	13	9	16	46	55	−9	48	
15	VfB Stuttgart II (Note: Reserve teams are ineligible for promotion or DFB-Pokal qualification.)	38	12	11	15	49	59	−10	47	
16	Waldhof Mannheim	38	11	13	14	43	45	−2	46	
17	Borussia Dortmund II (R)	38	11	10	17	53	60	−7	43	Relegation to Regionalliga
18	Hannover 96 II (R)	38	9	10	19	51	70	−19	37	Relegation to Regionalliga
19	SV Sandhausen (R)	38	9	8	21	49	69	−20	35	Relegation to Regionalliga
20	SpVgg Unterhaching (R)	38	4	13	21	40	72	−32	25	Relegation to Regionalliga

Source: DFB
Rules for classification: 1) Points; 2) Goal difference; 3) Goals scored; 4) Head-to-head results; 5) Head-to-head away goals scored; 6) Away goals scored; 7) Play-off.
(C) Champions; (P) Promoted; (R) Relegated

== Results ==
Home \ Away	AAC	AUE	BIE	COT	DOR	DRE	ESS	HAN	ING	KÖL	MAN	MUN	OSN	ROS	SAA	SAN	STU	UNT	VER	WIE
Alemannia Aachen	—	1–2	0–1	0–0	2–2	0–1	2–0	0–0	1–1	1–0	0–0	1–1	1–0	2–1	4–2	2–1	2–1	3–1	1–1	0–0
Erzgebirge Aue	1–1	—	1–3	1–3	2–1	2–0	2–1	2–1	1–0	2–1	0–1	3–1	0–0	1–2	1–1	2–3	2–1	1–0	2–5	2–1
Arminia Bielefeld	1–1	2–1	—	0–2	1–0	1–1	1–2	2–2	1–0	2–0	1–0	0–1	3–1	4–0	3–1	1–1	4–1	3–3	2–1	4–2
Energie Cottbus	2–1	1–0	1–2	—	3–3	1–1	0–1	2–2	1–4	1–0	2–4	5–1	1–2	3–1	4–1	1–1	4–0	2–0	1–0	2–1
Borussia Dortmund II	3–0	3–1	0–4	4–1	—	2–1	0–1	0–4	3–3	1–1	0–1	1–2	1–1	0–2	0–0	1–0	0–1	3–0	3–1	2–2
Dynamo Dresden	0–0	2–1	3–0	4–2	0–0	—	3–3	2–1	2–2	2–3	2–1	5–2	0–1	1–1	1–1	2–1	2–0	3–0	3–0	2–0
Rot-Weiss Essen	1–2	4–2	0–0	4–0	3–1	1–1	—	5–1	2–0	2–1	1–0	0–3	3–1	2–1	0–3	1–1	2–2	1–1	1–3	0–3
Hannover 96 II	1–1	2–1	1–4	0–0	2–0	2–3	1–3	—	0–4	1–2	1–1	1–3	1–5	2–1	1–3	2–2	3–1	0–0	1–2	3–2
FC Ingolstadt	0–3	1–0	0–3	1–1	5–3	1–1	2–2	3–3	—	3–1	2–1	1–2	4–2	2–1	1–0	2–1	1–1	3–1	1–1	2–3
Viktoria Köln	3–1	2–0	0–2	0–1	3–5	1–2	1–0	2–0	4–4	—	1–0	1–2	2–0	3–0	1–2	2–0	2–0	3–1	2–1	2–0
Waldhof Mannheim	2–1	3–0	1–1	0–1	0–0	1–0	1–0	2–1	0–0	1–2	—	0–3	3–2	5–0	0–1	3–2	0–0	0–2	2–2	2–2
1860 Munich	2–1	1–1	0–3	5–1	1–0	2–3	1–3	1–0	1–1	1–3	3–0	—	2–2	1–2	0–1	2–0	1–1	2–1	0–4	2–3
VfL Osnabrück	1–1	0–2	0–1	2–5	1–0	0–3	2–0	1–1	1–0	2–0	1–1	1–0	—	0–1	1–1	3–2	1–0	4–2	0–3	0–1
Hansa Rostock	1–2	4–1	2–1	1–3	1–1	1–0	4–0	1–0	2–0	1–1	1–1	1–0	2–0	—	0–0	1–0	1–1	4–1	4–0	1–4
1. FC Saarbrücken	1–1	2–0	0–0	2–1	2–1	1–4	1–0	4–1	2–3	1–0	2–1	4–0	1–1	2–0	—	0–1	0–2	1–1	4–3	3–1
SV Sandhausen	4–0	4–6	1–0	0–1	3–1	2–4	0–2	0–1	4–3	0–4	2–1	0–3	1–0	0–3	3–4	—	1–1	2–2	1–3	0–1
VfB Stuttgart II	2–1	0–1	3–0	2–0	0–3	2–1	1–1	2–1	3–2	1–2	2–0	3–1	1–2	0–3	2–3	2–1	—	3–2	1–1	2–2
SpVgg Unterhaching	0–2	2–2	1–2	1–1	1–2	0–3	2–0	1–2	2–1	1–1	1–1	2–2	2–3	0–2	2–0	0–0	2–2	—	1–2	1–1
SC Verl	2–1	5–1	2–1	0–3	0–1	0–3	3–0	1–0	1–4	1–1	1–1	2–2	1–1	1–0	1–1	1–1	2–2	2–0	—	2–2
Wehen Wiesbaden	2–1	0–2	0–0	2–1	4–2	1–0	1–3	1–5	2–5	4–1	2–2	0–0	2–1	1–0	1–1	1–3	2–0	3–0	0–1	—

Source: DFB
Legend: Blue = home team win; Yellow = draw; Red = away team win.

== Statistics ==
=== Top scorers ===
Rank	Player	Club	Goals
1	(Germany) Fatih Kaya	Wehen Wiesbaden	20
2	(Germany) Christoph Daferner	Dynamo Dresden	18
3	(Denmark) Sebastian Grønning	FC Ingolstadt	17
4	(Turkey) Tolcay Ciğerci	Energie Cottbus	15
4	(Germany) Lex-Tyger Lobinger	Viktoria Köln	15
4	(Germany) Timmy Thiele	Energie Cottbus	15
7	(Germany) Ahmet Arslan	Rot-Weiss Essen	14
7	(Germany) Serhat-Semih Güler	Viktoria Köln	14
7	(Germany) Julian Hettwer	Borussia Dortmund II	14
7	(Germany) Julian Kania	Arminia Bielefeld	14

=== Hat-tricks ===
Player	Club	Against	Result	Date
(Germany) Timmy Thiele^{4}	Energie Cottbus	1. FC Saarbrücken	4–1 (H)	28 September 2024
(Germany) Julian Kania	Arminia Bielefeld	Hannover 96 II	4–1 (A)	23 October 2024
(Denmark) Sebastian Grønning	FC Ingolstadt	VfL Osnabrück	4–2 (H)	24 November 2024
(Montenegro) Omar Sijarić	Erzgebirge Aue	SV Sandhausen	6–4 (A)	14 December 2024
(Germany) Christian Kinsombi	Hansa Rostock	SC Verl	6–0 (H)	12 April 2025
(Germany) Florian Krüger	1. FC Saarbrücken	SC Verl	4–3 (H)	3 May 2025

^{4} Player scored four goals.

=== Clean sheets ===
Rank	Player	Club	Clean sheets
1	(Germany) Jonas Kersken	Arminia Bielefeld	14
1	(Germany) Benjamin Uphoff	Hansa Rostock	14
3	(Germany) Elias Bethke	Energie Cottbus	12
4	(Germany) Phillip Menzel	1. FC Saarbrücken	11
5	(Germany) Jan-Christoph Bartels	Waldhof Mannheim	10
5	(Germany) Dudu	Viktoria Köln	10
5	(Germany) Tim Schreiber	Dynamo Dresden	10
5	(Germany) Florian Stritzel	Wehen Wiesbaden	10
9	(Germany) Jakob Golz	Rot-Weiss Essen	7
9	(Germany) Marco Hiller	1860 Munich	7
9	(Sweden) Lukas Jonsson	VfL Osnabrück	7
9	(Germany) Martin Männel	Erzgebirge Aue	7
9	(Germany) Philipp Schulze	SC Verl	7

== Attendances ==
#	Football club	Home games	Average attendance
1	SG Dynamo Dresden	19	28,991
2	Alemannia Aachen	19	25,861
3	FC Hansa Rostock	19	24,269
4	DSC Arminia Bielefeld	19	21,245
5	Rot-Weiß Essen	19	16,957
6	TSV München 1860	19	15,000
7	VfL Osnabrück	19	14,750
8	SV Waldhof Mannheim	19	12,946
9	1. FC Saarbrücken	19	12,910
10	FC Energie Cottbus	19	12,908
11	FC Erzgebirge Aue	19	8,972
12	SpVgg Unterhaching	19	5,737
13	FC Ingolstadt 04	19	5,725
14	FC Viktoria Köln	19	4,628
15	SV Wehen Wiesbaden	19	4,233
16	SV Sandhausen	19	4,144
17	Borussia Dortmund II	19	3,504
18	Hannover 96 II	19	3,294
19	SC Verl	19	2,731
20	VfB Stuttgart II	19	2,166
