= 2023–24 3. Liga =

15th season of the 3. Liga

3. Liga
- Season: 2023–24
- Dates: 4 August 2023 – 18 May 2024
- Champions: SSV Ulm
- Promoted: SSV Ulm; Preußen Münster; Jahn Regensburg
- Relegated: Hallescher FC; MSV Duisburg; SC Freiburg II; VfB Lübeck
- Matches: 380
- Goals: 1,066 (2.81 per match)
- Top goalscorer: Jannik Mause (18 goals)
- Biggest home win: Dresden 7–2 Lübeck; Ingolstadt 6–1 Lübeck
- Biggest away win: Essen 0–5 Verl; Lübeck 0–5 Dortmund II
- Highest scoring: Dresden 7–2 Lübeck; Sandhausen 6–3 Regensburg
- Longest winning run: 10 games Regensburg
- Longest unbeaten run: 18 games Ulm
- Longest winless run: 15 games Freiburg
- Longest losing run: 6 games Freiburg
- Highest attendance: 31,834; Dresden v Aue
- Lowest attendance: 815; Freiburg v Verl
- Attendance: 3,662,893 (9,639 per match)

The 2023–24 3. Liga was the 16th season of the 3. Liga. It started on 4 August 2023 and concluded on 18 May 2024.

The fixtures were announced on 7 July 2023.

== Teams ==
Locations of the 2023–24 3. Liga teams

=== Team changes ===
Promoted from 2022–23 Regionalliga	Relegated from 2022–23 2. Bundesliga	Promoted to 2023–24 2. Bundesliga	Relegated to 2023–24 Regionalliga
VfB Lübeck; Preußen Münster; SSV Ulm; SpVgg Unterhaching	Arminia Bielefeld; SV Sandhausen; Jahn Regensburg	SV Elversberg; VfL Osnabrück; Wehen Wiesbaden	SpVgg Bayreuth; FSV Zwickau; SV Meppen; VfB Oldenburg

=== Stadiums and locations ===
Team	Location	Stadium	Capacity
Erzgebirge Aue	Aue-Bad Schlema	Erzgebirgsstadion	15,711
Arminia Bielefeld	Bielefeld	Schüco-Arena	27,300
Borussia Dortmund II	Dortmund	Stadion Rote Erde; Signal Iduna Park	9,999; 81,365
Dynamo Dresden	Dresden	Rudolf-Harbig-Stadion	32,085
MSV Duisburg	Duisburg	Schauinsland-Reisen-Arena	31,500
Rot-Weiss Essen	Essen	Stadion an der Hafenstraße	20,650
SC Freiburg II	Freiburg im Breisgau	Dreisamstadion	24,000
Hallescher FC	Halle	Leuna-Chemie-Stadion	15,057
FC Ingolstadt	Ingolstadt	Audi Sportpark	15,000
Viktoria Köln	Cologne	Sportpark Höhenberg	8,343
VfB Lübeck	Lübeck	Stadion Lohmühle	17,849
Waldhof Mannheim	Mannheim	Carl-Benz-Stadion	25,667
1860 Munich	Munich	Grünwalder Stadion	15,000
Preußen Münster	Münster	Preußenstadion	14,300
Jahn Regensburg	Regensburg	Jahnstadion Regensburg	15,210
1. FC Saarbrücken	Saarbrücken	Ludwigsparkstadion	16,003
SV Sandhausen	Sandhausen	GP Stadion am Hardtwald	15,414
SSV Ulm	Ulm; Aalen	Donaustadion; Centus Arena^{1}	19,500; 14,500
SpVgg Unterhaching	Unterhaching	Uhlsport Park	15,053
SC Verl	Verl	Sportclub Arena	5,207

^{1} SSV Ulm played five games in Aalen because their own stadium had no under-soil heating.

=== Personnel and kits ===
Team	Manager	Captain	Kit manufacturer	Shirt sponsor		
Team	Manager	Captain	Kit manufacturer	Front	Sleeve	Back
Erzgebirge Aue	(Bulgaria) Pavel Dochev	(Germany) Martin Männel	Nike	Medical Beauty Research	Erzgebirgssparkasse	G&K Innenausbau
Arminia Bielefeld	(Germany) Michél Kniat	(Germany) Fabian Klos	Macron	Schüco	JAB Anstoetz Textilien	holz4home
Borussia Dortmund II	(Germany) Jan Zimmermann	(Germany) Franz Pfanne	Puma	1&1	GLS Group	None
Dynamo Dresden	(Germany) Heiko Scholz	(Germany) Stefan Kutschke	Umbro	ALL-INKL.COM	Sonnenstrahl Dresden	Brandible.de
MSV Duisburg	(Germany) Uwe Schubert	(Germany) Sebastian Mai	Capelli	Trinkgut	Zoxs	Duisburg CityCom
Rot-Weiss Essen	(Germany) Christoph Dabrowski	(Germany) Felix Bastians	Jako	ifm Electronic	ifm Electronic	sportwetten.de
SC Freiburg II	(Switzerland) Thomas Stamm	(Germany) Sandrino Braun-Schumacher	Nike	JobRad	BABISTA	None
Hallescher FC	(Germany) Stefan Reisinger	(Germany) Jonas Nietfeld	Puma	MobileBet	Saalesparkasse	ISIHOME
FC Ingolstadt	(Germany) Sabrina Wittmann	(Germany) Lukas Fröde	Puma	SI Electronics	Audi Schanzer Fußballschule	PROSIS GmbH
Viktoria Köln	(Germany) Olaf Janßen	(Germany) Moritz Fritz	Capelli	Peynooş	Wintec Autoglas	ETL
VfB Lübeck	(Germany) Jens Martens	(Germany) Tommy Grupe	Capelli	HanseBelt	Mayo Feinkost	Iperdi
Waldhof Mannheim	(Germany) Marco Antwerpen	(Germany) Marcel Seegert	Uhlsport	CrazyBuzzer	None	None
1860 Munich	(Greece) Argiris Giannikis	(Netherlands) Jesper Verlaat	Nike	Die Bayerische	Bet3000	Pangea Life
Preußen Münster	(Germany) Sascha Hildmann	(Germany) Marc Lorenz	Jako	FIEGE	Stadtwerke Münster	Gieseke
Jahn Regensburg	(United States) Joe Enochs	(Germany) Andreas Geipl	Hummel	Netto	Wolf GmbH	Netto
1. FC Saarbrücken	(Germany) Rüdiger Ziehl	(Germany) Manuel Zeitz	Adidas	Victor's Group	Saarland-Sporttoto	Victor's Group
SV Sandhausen	(Germany) Gerhard Kleppinger	(Germany) Dennis Diekmeier	Macron	Weingut Reichsrat von Buhl	Goelz Paletten	Service Pitzler
SSV Ulm	(Germany) Thomas Wörle	(Germany) Johannes Reichert	Uhlsport	Husqvarna Group	B-ITE E-Recruiting	UZIN UTZ
SpVgg Unterhaching	(Germany) Marc Unterberger	(Germany) Josef Welzmüller	Uhlsport	Alpenbauer	Lupse & Lupse	None
SC Verl	(Germany) Alexander Ende	(United States) Mael Corboz	Joma	Beckhoff	EGE GmbH	None

=== Managerial changes ===
Team	Outgoing	Manner	Exit date		Position in table	Incoming	Incoming date		Ref.
Team	Outgoing	Manner	Announced on	Departed on	Position in table	Incoming	Announced on	Arrived on	Ref.
SpVgg Unterhaching	(Germany) Sandro Wagner	Resigned	23 March 2023	30 June 2023	Pre-season	(Germany) Marc Unterberger	27 March 2023	1 July 2023	
SV Sandhausen	(Germany) Gerhard Kleppinger (interim)	End of caretaker	10 April 2023	30 June 2023	Pre-season	(Germany) Danny Galm	19 June 2023	1 July 2023	
Waldhof Mannheim	(Germany) Christian Neidhart	Mutual consent	28 May 2023	30 June 2023	Pre-season	(Germany) Rüdiger Rehm	12 June 2023	1 July 2023	
Arminia Bielefeld	(Germany) Uwe Koschinat	End of contract	9 June 2023	30 June 2023	Pre-season	(Germany) Michél Kniat	13 June 2023	1 July 2023	
SC Verl	(Germany) Michél Kniat	Signed for Arminia Bielefeld	13 June 2023	30 June 2023	Pre-season	(Germany) Alexander Ende	30 June 2023	1 July 2023	
MSV Duisburg	(Germany) Torsten Ziegner	Sacked	16 September 2023		19th	(Germany) Engin Vural (interim)	18 September 2023		
MSV Duisburg	(Germany) Engin Vural	End of caretaker	9 October 2023		20th	(Germany) Boris Schommers	9 October 2023		
SV Sandhausen	(Germany) Danny Galm	Sacked	22 October 2023		10th	(Germany) Jens Keller	23 October 2023		
1860 Munich	(Switzerland) Maurizio Jacobacci	Sacked	5 December 2023		15th	(Germany) Frank Schmöller (interim)	5 December 2023		
VfB Lübeck	(Germany) Lukas Pfeiffer	Sacked	11 December 2023		17th	(Germany) Bastian Reinhardt (interim)	11 December 2023		
VfB Lübeck	(Germany) Bastian Reinhardt (interim)	End of caretaker spell	28 December 2023		18th	(Germany) Florian Schnorrenberg	28 December 2023		
1860 Munich	(Germany) Frank Schmöller (interim)	End of caretaker spell	10 January 2024		15th	(Greece) Argiris Giannikis	10 January 2024		
Waldhof Mannheim	(Germany) Rüdiger Rehm	Sacked	31 January 2024		17th	(Germany) Marco Antwerpen	31 January 2024		
VfB Lübeck	(Germany) Florian Schnorrenberg	Sacked	11 March 2024		19th	(Germany) Bastian Reinhardt (interim)	11 March 2024		
VfB Lübeck	(Germany) Bastian Reinhardt (interim)	End of caretaker spell	26 March 2024		19th	(Germany) Jens Martens	26 March 2024		
Hallescher FC	(Germany) Sreto Ristić	Sacked	1 April 2024		17th	(Germany) Stefan Reisinger	1 April 2024		
Dynamo Dresden	(Germany) Markus Anfang	Sacked	20 April 2024		3rd	(Germany) Heiko Scholz (interim)	20 April 2024		
MSV Duisburg	(Germany) Boris Schommers	Sacked	23 April 2024		18th	(Germany) Uwe Schubert (interim)	23 April 2024		
FC Ingolstadt	(Germany) Michael Köllner	Sacked	2 May 2024		11th	(Germany) Sabrina Wittmann (interim)	2 May 2024		
SV Sandhausen	(Germany) Jens Keller	Mutual consent	13 May 2024		8th	(Germany) Gerhard Kleppinger (interim)	13 May 2024		

== League table ==
Pos	Team	Pld	W	D	L	GF	GA	GD	Pts	Promotion, qualification or relegation
1	SSV Ulm (C, P)	38	23	8	7	65	38	+27	77	Promotion to 2. Bundesliga and qualification for DFB-Pokal
2	Preußen Münster (P)	38	19	10	9	68	49	+19	67	Promotion to 2. Bundesliga and qualification for DFB-Pokal
3	Jahn Regensburg (O, P)	38	17	12	9	51	42	+9	63	Qualification for promotion play-offs and DFB-Pokal
4	Dynamo Dresden	38	19	5	14	58	40	+18	62	Qualification for DFB-Pokal
5	1. FC Saarbrücken	38	15	15	8	60	43	+17	60	
6	Erzgebirge Aue	38	16	12	10	51	47	+4	60	
7	Rot-Weiss Essen	38	17	8	13	60	53	+7	59	
8	SV Sandhausen	38	15	11	12	58	57	+1	56	
9	SpVgg Unterhaching	38	16	7	15	50	49	+1	55	
10	FC Ingolstadt	38	14	12	12	65	51	+14	54	
11	Borussia Dortmund II (Note: Reserve teams are ineligible for promotion or DFB-Pokal qualification.)	38	14	12	12	58	53	+5	54	
12	SC Verl	38	14	11	13	59	56	+3	53	
13	Viktoria Köln	38	13	10	15	59	65	−6	49	
14	Arminia Bielefeld	38	11	13	14	48	47	+1	46	
15	1860 Munich	38	13	7	18	40	42	−2	46	
16	Waldhof Mannheim	38	11	10	17	51	60	−9	43	
17	Hallescher FC (R)	38	11	7	20	50	68	−18	40	Relegation to Regionalliga
18	MSV Duisburg (R)	38	8	10	20	41	65	−24	34	Relegation to Regionalliga
19	VfB Lübeck (R)	38	6	14	18	37	77	−40	32	Relegation to Regionalliga
20	SC Freiburg II (R)	38	8	6	24	37	64	−27	30	Relegation to Regionalliga

Source: DFB
Rules for classification: 1) Points; 2) Goal difference; 3) Goals scored; 4) Head-to-head results; 5) Head-to-head away goals scored; 6) Away goals scored; 7) Play-off.
(C) Champions; (O) Play-off winners; (P) Promoted; (R) Relegated

== Results ==
Home \ Away	AUE	BIE	DOR	DRE	DUI	ESS	FRE	HAL	ING	KÖL	LÜB	MAN	MUN	MÜN	REG	SAA	SAN	ULM	UNT	VER
Erzgebirge Aue	—	1–0	2–0	2–1	1–1	2–1	2–1	3–1	1–0	2–1	2–0	2–0	1–2	2–3	0–1	2–0	2–1	1–2	2–1	1–2
Arminia Bielefeld	2–2	—	2–2	0–1	2–0	1–1	0–2	0–0	4–0	0–2	0–0	3–1	2–0	4–0	1–1	2–6	1–1	0–2	1–2	0–0
Borussia Dortmund II	2–2	0–2	—	0–2	1–0	1–2	1–0	2–1	1–1	2–1	1–1	1–2	3–0	2–3	1–0	1–1	1–2	1–2	2–2	5–2
Dynamo Dresden	2–1	3–1	1–2	—	4–0	2–2	2–0	2–1	2–0	0–2	7–2	2–1	2–1	1–0	0–1	1–3	0–1	0–0	2–1	0–1
MSV Duisburg	2–2	0–1	2–1	2–4	—	1–2	4–2	2–3	0–1	1–0	1–0	1–1	0–3	0–0	0–1	2–0	3–1	1–1	1–0	2–3
Rot-Weiss Essen	1–1	2–1	4–0	3–1	3–1	—	4–3	3–2	4–0	3–1	1–0	2–0	0–1	1–0	0–0	2–1	1–2	0–2	1–3	0–5
SC Freiburg II	0–1	0–3	0–0	1–1	1–1	0–2	—	1–2	1–4	1–0	3–0	1–0	1–0	2–2	3–1	0–4	0–2	1–2	0–0	0–1
Hallescher FC	2–3	2–2	1–1	1–0	1–1	2–1	2–2	—	3–1	2–1	3–0	1–4	0–2	1–4	1–2	0–2	4–1	0–2	0–1	1–0
FC Ingolstadt	1–1	1–1	1–1	2–1	2–0	2–1	2–3	4–0	—	1–3	6–1	1–1	2–1	1–1	2–4	2–2	4–0	4–0	3–0	0–1
Viktoria Köln	2–2	1–1	1–3	1–5	2–0	0–0	2–0	4–2	1–0	—	1–0	2–2	2–1	3–5	1–1	2–5	2–1	1–3	2–1	3–1
VfB Lübeck	1–1	2–2	0–5	0–1	5–3	3–3	0–1	2–2	0–4	3–2	—	2–1	1–1	0–3	1–0	0–0	0–0	1–1	2–3	0–0
Waldhof Mannheim	3–0	1–0	1–3	0–2	0–0	0–2	3–1	3–2	1–1	1–1	2–2	—	1–0	2–2	3–1	0–2	4–2	0–2	6–1	1–2
1860 Munich	1–2	0–2	1–2	0–0	4–1	2–0	2–0	1–0	3–1	3–1	1–2	2–0	—	1–2	0–1	1–1	1–1	0–1	0–1	1–0
Preußen Münster	4–0	2–1	0–0	1–0	3–1	2–1	2–0	1–0	3–1	3–3	1–1	1–3	1–1	—	1–3	4–1	1–1	3–2	2–0	3–1
Jahn Regensburg	0–0	2–0	0–0	1–1	2–1	1–3	3–2	2–0	1–1	1–1	2–1	2–0	1–1	2–1	—	0–1	1–2	2–0	1–1	1–1
1. FC Saarbrücken	2–0	1–1	2–0	1–0	0–0	1–1	2–1	0–1	0–2	1–2	1–1	1–1	2–3	0–0	2–2	—	4–1	2–1	2–1	4–3
SV Sandhausen	1–0	1–2	3–2	1–0	2–0	2–0	1–0	1–1	1–1	3–3	1–2	3–0	3–0	0–2	6–3	2–2	—	1–2	1–0	2–2
SSV Ulm	2–2	1–0	1–1	2–3	2–2	2–1	2–1	2–3	0–0	2–0	3–0	3–1	1–0	2–0	1–0	1–1	2–0	—	2–0	4–2
SpVgg Unterhaching	0–0	1–2	3–4	1–2	1–0	4–0	1–0	2–0	0–3	2–1	4–1	3–0	2–0	3–2	1–2	0–0	0–0	3–2	—	1–0
SC Verl	3–1	3–1	2–3	1–0	1–3	1–1	3–2	3–2	2–2	1–1	4–0	1–1	0–1	2–0	1–2	0–0	4–4	0–3	0–0	—

Source: DFB
Legend: Blue = home team win; Yellow = draw; Red = away team win.

== Statistics ==
=== Top scorers ===
Rank	Player	Club	Goals
1	(Germany) Jannik Mause	FC Ingolstadt	18
2	(Germany) Malik Batmaz	Preußen Münster	17
2	(Germany) Joel Grodowski	Preußen Münster	17
4	(Germany) Dominic Baumann	Hallescher FC	15
5	(Germany) Stefan Kutschke	Dynamo Dresden	14
5	(Germany) Lars Lokotsch	SC Verl	14
5	(Germany) Luca Marseiler	Viktoria Köln	14
8	(Germany) Marcel Bär	Erzgebirge Aue	13
8	(Germany) Patrick Hobsch	SpVgg Unterhaching	13
8	(Germany) Ole Pohlmann	Borussia Dortmund II	13

=== Hat-tricks ===
Player	Club	Against	Result	Date
(Germany) Malik Batmaz	Preußen Münster	Erzgebirge Aue	4–0 (H)	5 October 2023
(Germany) Mathias Fetsch^{4}	SpVgg Unterhaching	Rot-Weiss Essen	4–0 (H)	5 October 2023
(Germany) Oliver Batista Meier	SC Verl	Rot-Weiss Essen	5–0 (A)	7 October 2023
(Germany) Stefan Kutschke	Dynamo Dresden	Viktoria Köln	5–1 (A)	10 November 2023
(Germany) Ole Pohlmann	Borussia Dortmund II	SpVgg Unterhaching	4–3 (A)	24 February 2024
(Germany) Maximilian Breunig	SC Freiburg II	VfB Lübeck	3–0 (A)	9 March 2024
(Croatia) Leonardo Vonić	Rot-Weiss Essen	VfB Lübeck	3–3 (A)	18 May 2024

^{4} Player scored four goals.

=== Clean sheets ===
Rank	Player	Club	Clean sheets
1	(Germany) Christian Ortag	SSV Ulm	16
2	(Germany) René Vollath	SpVgg Unterhaching	14
3	(Germany) Nikolai Rehnen	SV Sandhausen	11
4	(Germany) Jonas Kersken	Arminia Bielefeld	10
4	(Germany) Luca Unbehaun	SC Verl	10
6	(Germany) Marius Funk	FC Ingolstadt	9
6	(Germany) Jakob Golz	Rot-Weiss Essen	9
6	(Germany) Marco Hiller	1860 Munich	9
6	(Germany) Martin Männel	Erzgebirge Aue	9
6	(Germany) Tim Schreiber	1. FC Saarbrücken	9
6	(Germany) Maximilian Schulze Niehues	Preußen Münster	9

== Attendances ==
Dynamo Dresden drew the highest average home attendance in the 2023-24 edition of the 3. Liga.

#	Football club	Home games	Average attendance
1	Dynamo Dresden	19	28,732
2	Arminia Bielefeld	19	18,640
3	RW Essen	19	16,652
4	1860 München	19	15,000
5	MSV Duisburg	19	12,119
6	1. FC Saarbrücken	19	10,910
7	Preußen Münster	19	10,783
8	Waldhof Mannheim	19	10,389
9	SSV Ulm 1846	19	10,350
10	Jahn Regensburg	19	9,725
11	Erzgebirge Aue	19	8,720
12	Hallescher FC	19	7,837
13	FC Ingolstadt 04	19	5,638
14	VfB Lübeck	19	5,485
15	SpVgg Unterhaching	19	5,136
16	Viktoria Köln	19	4,095
17	SV Sandhausen	19	4,060
18	Borussia Dortmund II	19	3,324
19	SC Verl	19	2,632
20	SC Freiburg II	19	2,334
