= 2022–23 3. Liga =

15th season of the 3. Liga

3. Liga
- Season: 2022–23
- Dates: 22 July 2022 – 27 May 2023
- Champions: SV Elversberg
- Promoted: SV Elversberg; VfL Osnabrück; Wehen Wiesbaden
- Relegated: SpVgg Bayreuth; FSV Zwickau; SV Meppen; VfB Oldenburg
- Matches: 379
- Goals: 1,106 (2.92 per match)
- Top goalscorer: Ahmet Arslan (25 goals)
- Biggest home win: Dresden 7–1 Halle
- Biggest away win: Bayreuth 0–6 Saarbrücken
- Highest scoring: Meppen 6–2 Mannheim; Oldenburg 3–5 Essen; Dresden 7–1 Halle; Bayreuth 5–3 Zwickau
- Longest winning run: 5 games Ingolstadt; Munich; Saarbrücken
- Longest unbeaten run: 8 games Saarbrücken
- Longest winless run: 8 games Aue
- Longest losing run: 3 games Halle; Oldenburg
- Attendance: 3,115,102 (8,219 per match)

The 2022–23 3. Liga was the 15th season of the 3. Liga. It started on 22 July 2022 and concluded on 27 May 2023.

The fixtures were released on 24 June 2022.

SV Elversberg and VfL Osnabrück were promoted to the 2. Bundesliga, while SpVgg Bayreuth, FSV Zwickau, SV Meppen and VfB Oldenburg got relegated to the Regionalliga. Wehen Wiesbaden were also promoted after winning the 2. Bundesliga relegation play-offs.

== Teams ==
Locations of the 2022–23 3. Liga teams

=== Team changes ===
Promoted from 2021–22 Regionalliga	Relegated from 2021–22 2. Bundesliga	Promoted to 2022–23 2. Bundesliga	Relegated from 2021–22 3. Liga
SpVgg Bayreuth; SV Elversberg; Rot-Weiss Essen; VfB Oldenburg	Erzgebirge Aue; FC Ingolstadt; Dynamo Dresden	1. FC Magdeburg; Eintracht Braunschweig; 1. FC Kaiserslautern	Viktoria Berlin; Würzburger Kickers; TSV Havelse; Türkgücü München

=== Stadiums and locations ===
Team	Location	Stadium	Capacity	Founded
Erzgebirge Aue	Aue-Bad Schlema	Erzgebirgsstadion	15,711	1946
SpVgg Bayreuth	Bayreuth; Erfurt	Hans-Walter-Wild-Stadion; Steigerwaldstadion^{1}	21,500; 18,600	1921
Borussia Dortmund II	Dortmund	Stadion Rote Erde	9,999	1909
Dynamo Dresden	Dresden	Rudolf-Harbig-Stadion	32,085	1953
MSV Duisburg	Duisburg	Schauinsland-Reisen-Arena	31,500	1902
SV Elversberg	Spiesen-Elversberg	Waldstadion an der Kaiserlinde	10,000	1907
Rot-Weiss Essen	Essen	Stadion an der Hafenstraße	20,650	1907
SC Freiburg II	Freiburg im Breisgau	Dreisamstadion	24,000	1904
Hallescher FC	Halle	Leuna-Chemie-Stadion	15,057	1900
FC Ingolstadt	Ingolstadt	Audi Sportpark	15,000	2004
Viktoria Köln	Cologne	Sportpark Höhenberg	8,343	1904
Waldhof Mannheim	Mannheim	Carl-Benz-Stadion	25,667	1907
SV Meppen	Meppen	Hänsch-Arena	16,500	1912
1860 Munich	Munich	Grünwalder Stadion	15,000	1860
VfB Oldenburg	Oldenburg; Hanover	Marschweg-Stadion; Heinz von Heiden-Arena^{2}	15,000; 49,200	1897
VfL Osnabrück	Osnabrück	Stadion an der Bremer Brücke	16,667	1899
1. FC Saarbrücken	Saarbrücken	Ludwigsparkstadion	16,003	1903
SC Verl	Paderborn	Home Deluxe Arena^{3}	15,000	1924
Wehen Wiesbaden	Wiesbaden	BRITA-Arena	12,250	1926
FSV Zwickau	Zwickau	GGZ-Arena Zwickau	10,049	1912

^{1} SpVgg Bayreuth will initially play their evening home matches at the Steigerwaldstadion since their home stadium, the Hans-Walter-Wild-Stadion, currently lacks floodlights. The club aims to fix this by the beginning of the season.
^{2} VfB Oldenburg will initially play their evening and winter home matches at the Heinz von Heiden-Arena since their home stadium, the Marschweg-Stadion, currently lacks floodlights and a heated pitch and is bound to noise regulation ordinances for matches after 18:30. The club aims to fix these problems and move back to Oldenburg as soon as possible.
^{3} SC Verl will play their home matches at the Home Deluxe Arena since their home stadium, the Sportclub Arena in Verl, does not meet 3. Liga standards.

=== Personnel and kits ===
Team	Manager	Captain	Kit manufacturer	Shirt sponsor		
Team	Manager	Captain	Kit manufacturer	Front	Sleeve	Back
Erzgebirge Aue	(Bulgaria) Pavel Dochev	(Germany) Martin Männel	Nike	WätaS Wärmetauscher Sachsen	Leonhardt Group	green-living.de
SpVgg Bayreuth	(Germany) Julian Kolbeck	(Germany) Benedikt Kirsch	Adidas	maxit	Med 360°	Greenlight Consulting
Borussia Dortmund II	(Germany) Jan Zimmermann	(Germany) Franz Pfanne	Puma	1&1	GLS Group	
Dynamo Dresden	(Germany) Markus Anfang	(Germany) Tim Knipping	Umbro	ALL-INKL.COM	Sonnenstrahl Dresden	Brandible.de
MSV Duisburg	(Germany) Torsten Ziegner	(Germany) Moritz Stoppelkamp	Capelli	Trinkgut	Zoxs	SIMon mobile
SV Elversberg	(Germany) Horst Steffen	(Germany) Kevin Conrad	Nike	HYLO	KSC Reifen Stephan	Flyeralarm
Rot-Weiss Essen	(Germany) Christoph Dabrowski	(Germany) Daniel Heber	Jako	Harfid; Deutsche Saatgut	ifm	sportwetten.de
SC Freiburg II	(Switzerland) Thomas Stamm	(Germany) Sandrino Braun-Schumacher	Nike	Cazoo	BABISTA	
Hallescher FC	(Germany) Sreto Ristić	(Germany) Jonas Nietfeld	Puma	MobileBet	Saalesparkasse	ISIHOME
FC Ingolstadt	(Germany) Michael Köllner	(Germany) Tobias Schröck	Puma	PROSIS	Audi Schanzer Fußballschule	
Viktoria Köln	(Germany) Olaf Janßen	(Germany) Marcel Risse	Capelli	ETL	Wintec Autoglas	VEREINT! - PSD Bank West
Waldhof Mannheim	(Germany) Christian Neidhart	(Germany) Marcel Seegert	Capelli	SI Trading	Likaj Real Estate	Mc Cate
SV Meppen	(Germany) Ernst Middendorp	(Germany) Luka Tankulic	Nike	KiKxxl	Echt Emsland	ELA Container
1860 Munich	(Switzerland) Maurizio Jacobacci	(Germany) Stefan Lex	Nike	Die Bayerische	Bet3000	Pangea Life
VfB Oldenburg	(Turkey) Fuat Kılıç	(Germany) Max Wegner	Hummel	CleverReach	BÄKO	Öffentliche Oldenburg
VfL Osnabrück	(Germany) Tobias Schweinsteiger	(Germany) Marc Heider	Umbro	SO-TECH	JOPA	
1. FC Saarbrücken	(Germany) Rüdiger Ziehl	(Germany) Manuel Zeitz	Adidas	Victor's Group	Saarland-Sporttoto	Victor's Group
SC Verl	(Germany) Michél Kniat	(United States) Mael Corboz	Joma	Beckhoff	EGE GmbH	
Wehen Wiesbaden	(Germany) Markus Kauczinski	(Germany) Johannes Wurtz	Capelli	Brita	MobileBet	quickpaid
FSV Zwickau	(Germany) Ronny Thielemann	(Germany) Johannes Brinkies	Puma	Omni Group	ATUS	WP Holding

=== Managerial changes ===
Team	Outgoing	Manner	Exit date		Position in table	Incoming	Incoming date		Ref.
Team	Outgoing	Manner	Announced on	Departed on	Position in table	Incoming	Announced on	Arrived on	Ref.
Erzgebirge Aue	(Bulgaria) Pavel Dochev	Resigned	3 March 2022	30 June 2022	Pre-season	(Germany) Timo Rost	21 May 2022	1 July 2022	
Waldhof Mannheim	(Germany) Patrick Glöckner	Mutual consent	4 May 2022	30 June 2022	Pre-season	(Germany) Christian Neidhart	2 June 2022	1 July 2022	
Rot-Weiss Essen	(Germany) Jörn Nowak (interim)	End of caretaker spell	5 May 2022	30 June 2022	Pre-season	(Germany) Christoph Dabrowski	2 June 2022	1 July 2022	
SpVgg Bayreuth	(Germany) Timo Rost	Signed for Erzgebirge Aue	21 May 2022	30 June 2022	Pre-season	(Germany) Thomas Kleine	31 May 2022	1 July 2022	
SV Meppen	(Germany) Rico Schmitt	Sacked	23 May 2022	30 June 2022	Pre-season	(Germany) Stefan Krämer	3 June 2022	1 July 2022	
Dynamo Dresden	(Germany) Guerino Capretti	Sacked	27 May 2022	30 June 2022	Pre-season	(Germany) Markus Anfang	10 June 2022	1 July 2022	
Borussia Dortmund II	(Germany) Enrico Maaßen	Signed for FC Augsburg	8 June 2022	30 June 2022	Pre-season	(Germany) Christian Preußer	17 June 2022	1 July 2022	
VfL Osnabrück	(Germany) Daniel Scherning	Signed for Arminia Bielefeld	18 August 2022		12th	(Germany) Tim Danneberg/ (Brazil) Danilo de Souza (interim)	18 August 2022		
VfL Osnabrück	(Germany) Tim Danneberg/ (Brazil) Danilo de Souza (interim)	End of caretaker	29 August 2022		12th	(Germany) Tobias Schweinsteiger	29 August 2022		
Erzgebirge Aue	(Germany) Timo Rost	Sacked	21 September 2022		20th	(Germany) Carsten Müller (interim)	21 September 2022		
1. FC Saarbrücken	(Germany) Uwe Koschinat	Mutual consent	10 October 2022		8th	(Germany) Rüdiger Ziehl (interim)	11 October 2022		
Erzgebirge Aue	(Germany) Carsten Müller (interim)	End of caretaker spell	7 December 2022		18th	(Bulgaria) Pavel Dochev	7 December 2022		
1860 Munich	(Germany) Michael Köllner	Sacked	31 January 2023		6th	(Germany) Günther Gorenzel (interim)	31 January 2023		
FC Ingolstadt	(Germany) Rüdiger Rehm	Sacked	31 January 2023		7th	(Germany) Guerino Capretti	1 February 2023		
Hallescher FC	(Germany) André Meyer	Sacked	31 January 2023		19th	(Germany) Jens Kiefer (interim)	1 February 2023		
Borussia Dortmund II	(Germany) Christian Preußer	Sacked	6 February 2023		16th	(Germany) Jan Zimmermann	8 February 2023		
FSV Zwickau	(United States) Joe Enochs	Sacked	6 February 2023		17th	(Germany) Robin Lenk (interim)	6 February 2023		
Hallescher FC	(Germany) Jens Kiefer (interim)	End of caretaker spell	12 February 2023		20th	(Germany) Sreto Ristić	12 February 2023		
FSV Zwickau	(Germany) Robin Lenk (interim)	End of caretaker spell	18 February 2023	20 February 2023	17th	(Germany) Ronny Thielemann	18 February 2023	20 February 2023	
1860 Munich	(Germany) Günther Gorenzel (interim)	End of caretaker spell	26 February 2023		8th	(Switzerland) Maurizio Jacobacci	26 February 2023		
SV Meppen	(Germany) Stefan Krämer	Sacked	4 March 2023		20th	(Germany) Ernst Middendorp	7 March 2023		
VfB Oldenburg	(Germany) Dario Fossi	Sacked	6 March 2023		19th	(Germany) Frank Löning (interim)	6 March 2023		
VfB Oldenburg	(Germany) Frank Löning (interim)	End of caretaker spell	13 March 2023		20th	(Turkey) Fuat Kılıç	13 March 2023		
FC Ingolstadt	(Germany) Guerino Capretti	Sacked	4 April 2023		14th	(Germany) Michael Köllner	6 April 2023		
SpVgg Bayreuth	(Germany) Thomas Kleine	Sacked	7 May 2023		20th	(Germany) Julian Kolbeck	7 May 2023		

== League table ==
Pos	Team	Pld	W	D	L	GF	GA	GD	Pts	Promotion, qualification or relegation
1	SV Elversberg (C, P)	38	22	8	8	80	40	+40	74	Promotion to 2. Bundesliga and qualification for DFB-Pokal
2	SC Freiburg II (Note: Reserve teams are ineligible for promotion or DFB-Pokal qualification.)	38	21	10	7	54	34	+20	73	
3	VfL Osnabrück (P)	38	21	7	10	70	49	+21	70	Promotion to 2. Bundesliga and qualification for DFB-Pokal
4	Wehen Wiesbaden (O, P)	38	21	7	10	71	51	+20	70	Qualification for promotion play-offs and DFB-Pokal
5	1. FC Saarbrücken	38	20	9	9	64	39	+25	69	Qualification for DFB-Pokal
6	Dynamo Dresden	38	20	9	9	65	44	+21	69	
7	Waldhof Mannheim	38	19	3	16	63	65	−2	60	
8	1860 Munich	38	16	9	13	61	52	+9	57	
9	Viktoria Köln	38	14	13	11	58	53	+5	55	
10	SC Verl	38	13	10	15	60	58	+2	49	
11	FC Ingolstadt	38	14	5	19	54	56	−2	47	
12	MSV Duisburg	38	11	13	14	54	58	−4	46	
13	Borussia Dortmund II	38	13	6	19	47	49	−2	45	
14	Erzgebirge Aue	38	12	9	17	49	62	−13	45	
15	Rot-Weiss Essen	38	9	15	14	43	56	−13	42	
16	Hallescher FC	38	10	11	17	49	60	−11	41	
17	SV Meppen (R)	38	8	13	17	43	65	−22	37	Relegation to Regionalliga
18	VfB Oldenburg (R)	38	9	8	21	42	64	−22	35	Relegation to Regionalliga
19	FSV Zwickau (R)	38	9	8	21	42	72	−30	35	Relegation to Regionalliga
20	SpVgg Bayreuth (R)	38	9	5	24	39	81	−42	32	Relegation to Regionalliga

Source: DFB
Rules for classification: 1) Points; 2) Goal difference; 3) Goals scored; 4) Head-to-head results; 5) Head-to-head away goals scored; 6) Away goals scored; 7) Play-off.
(C) Champions; (O) Play-off winners; (P) Promoted; (R) Relegated

== Results ==
Home \ Away	AUE	BAY	DOR	DRE	DUI	ELV	ESS	FRE	HAL	ING	KÖL	MAN	MEP	MUN	OLD	OSN	SAA	VER	WIE	ZWI
Erzgebirge Aue	—	4–0	3–3	0–1	0–2	1–1	2–1	0–0	1–1	0–3	1–1	2–1	3–0	1–3	1–0	1–1	2–1	2–3	1–5	0–1
SpVgg Bayreuth	3–3	—	3–1	1–1	0–4	0–1	1–1	0–1	0–1	1–0	1–4	1–3	3–0	1–0	1–2	1–0	0–6	1–3	2–3	5–3
Borussia Dortmund II	0–1	1–0	—	1–3	2–0	2–0	1–0	0–2	0–0	0–4	0–2	4–0	1–0	1–1	1–2	1–2	1–2	1–0	0–1	4–0
Dynamo Dresden	1–0	1–2	3–0	—	2–0	2–3	2–1	1–1	7–1	1–1	1–1	2–1	1–1	3–4	2–1	3–2	1–2	2–0	3–1	0–0
MSV Duisburg	3–0	1–1	0–5	0–1	—	2–2	2–2	3–1	1–0	0–1	1–1	1–3	0–0	2–2	1–1	1–2	2–2	3–3	1–1	4–0
SV Elversberg	0–1	5–2	3–1	1–1	3–0	—	3–0	3–0	1–1	4–3	3–2	1–0	2–2	4–1	3–0	4–1	0–2	1–2	1–1	5–0
Rot-Weiss Essen	2–1	2–0	2–0	1–1	1–1	1–5	—	2–0	0–0	2–2	1–4	0–3	0–0	2–2	0–0	1–1	1–0	2–2	1–3	1–1
SC Freiburg II	1–1	2–0	1–0	1–1	2–0	2–1	0–3	—	2–0	1–0	1–0	3–2	2–0	2–0	1–0	1–1	1–1	1–1	4–2	4–0
Hallescher FC	5–2	3–0	0–0	0–2	2–2	1–3	2–0	1–3	—	1–0	2–2	3–1	1–1	0–0	2–0	0–1	1–2	5–1	2–3	0–2
FC Ingolstadt	1–2	1–0	1–2	2–3	2–0	1–2	1–1	0–1	1–0	—	1–3	1–0	3–1	1–3	0–2	1–4	0–0	3–1	2–3	0–0
Viktoria Köln	3–0	2–1	1–1	2–1	2–2	0–2	1–0	0–3	2–2	3–1	—	1–4	3–1	1–1	1–2	0–2	0–2	2–1	1–0	1–1
Waldhof Mannheim	1–0	2–1	2–1	2–1	3–1	2–1	1–2	2–1	4–1	3–2	3–1	—	3–1	3–1	1–3	0–2	1–0	1–1	1–0	2–1
SV Meppen	3–2	0–1	0–2	4–1	0–3	0–0	2–0	1–2	2–3	0–3	2–2	6–2	—	2–1	1–1	0–3	1–0	1–3	0–3	3–0
1860 Munich	3–1	2–0	1–4	1–2	4–1	1–1	1–1	1–0	3–1	1–2	0–1	3–1	4–0	—	1–0	3–0	0–1	0–3	3–1	3–1
VfB Oldenburg	1–3	1–1	2–1	1–3	2–3	2–3	3–5	0–0	0–1	0–3	1–3	1–1	1–1	2–2	—	4–3	0–1	1–0	1–2	1–2
VfL Osnabrück	3–1	2–3	2–1	0–1	1–0	1–0	1–0	1–1	3–2	0–1	3–1	5–0	2–2	0–2	2–0	—	2–2	2–1	4–1	4–3
1. FC Saarbrücken	0–0	5–0	1–0	2–0	2–3	0–4	3–0	2–2	2–0	3–4	2–1	2–1	0–0	2–0	3–1	1–2	—	1–0	2–2	3–2
SC Verl	3–2	4–1	2–1	2–3	1–0	1–2	1–1	1–2	2–2	2–1	2–2	2–2	2–2	0–1	2–1	0–1	2–0	—	1–1	3–0
Wehen Wiesbaden	1–2	4–1	1–1	1–0	1–3	1–0	3–1	3–1	1–0	4–1	1–1	3–0	1–2	2–0	3–1	1–1	0–2	2–1	—	4–3
FSV Zwickau	0–2	2–0	1–2	0–1	0–1	0–2	0–2 (Note: The FSV Zwickau v Rot-Weiss Essen match from 23 April 2023 was abandoned after the first half at a score of 1–1 after a spectator threw a cup of beer at the referee. The DFB Sports Court decided that the match would be counted as a 2–0 victory for Essen.)	0–1	3–2	2–0	0–0	3–1	1–1	2–2	0–1	4–3	2–2	2–1	0–1	—

Source: DFB
Legend: Blue = home team win; Yellow = draw; Red = away team win.

== Statistics ==
=== Top scorers ===
Rank	Player	Club	Goals
1	(Turkey) Ahmet Arslan	Dynamo Dresden	26
2	(Germany) Ba-Muaka Simakala	VfL Osnabrück	19
3	(Croatia) Ivan Prtajin	Wehen Wiesbaden	15
3	(Netherlands) Vincent Vermeij	SC Freiburg II	15
5	(Germany) Dominic Baumann	FSV Zwickau	14
5	(Germany) Benedict Hollerbach	Wehen Wiesbaden	14
5	(Germany) Luca Schnellbacher	SV Elversberg	14
8	(Denmark) Tobias Bech	FC Ingolstadt	13
8	(Germany) Justin Njinmah	Borussia Dortmund II	13
10	(Germany) Dominik Martinović	Waldhof Mannheim	12
10	(Germany) Robin Meißner	Viktoria Köln	12
10	(Germany) Jannik Rochelt	SV Elversberg	12

=== Hat-tricks ===
Player	Club	Against	Result	Date
(Germany) Marvin Pourié	SV Meppen	FSV Zwickau	3–0 (H)	6 August 2022
(Germany) Samuel Abifade	SV Meppen	Waldhof Mannheim	6–2 (H)	14 August 2022
(Germany) Sebastian Jacob	1. FC Saarbrücken	SpVgg Bayreuth	6–0 (A)	10 September 2022
(Germany) Fynn Lakenmacher	1860 Munich	FC Erzgebirge Aue	3–1 (H)	16 September 2022
(Germany) Thore Jacobsen	SV Elversberg	FC Ingolstadt	4–3 (H)	21 January 2023
(Germany) Benedict Hollerbach	Wehen Wiesbaden	SpVgg Bayreuth	3–2 (A)	12 February 2023
(Denmark) Tobias Bech	FC Ingolstadt	1. FC Saarbrücken	4–3 (A)	18 February 2023
(Germany) Benedict Hollerbach	Wehen Wiesbaden	FC Ingolstadt	4–1 (H)	4 March 2023
(Germany) Marten Winkler	Waldhof Mannheim	Hallescher FC	4–1 (H)	28 April 2023
(Germany) Ba-Muaka Simakala	VfL Osnabrück	FSV Zwickau	4–3 (H)	30 April 2023

=== Top assists ===
Rank	Player	Club	Assists
1	(Germany) Jannik Rochelt	SV Elversberg	15
2	(Germany) Richard Neudecker	1. FC Saarbrücken	13
3	(Germany) Moritz Stoppelkamp	MSV Duisburg	12
4	(Germany) Manuel Feil	SV Elversberg	11
4	(Germany) Ba-Muaka Simakala	VfL Osnabrück	11
6	(Germany) Stefan Lex	1860 Munich	10
6	(Germany) Ole Pohlmann	Borussia Dortmund II	10
8	(Germany) Ahmet Arslan	Dynamo Dresden	9
8	(Germany) Marcel Costly	FC Ingolstadt	9
8	(Germany) Erik Engelhardt	VfL Osnabrück	9
8	(Germany) Patrick Koronkiewicz	Viktoria Köln	9
8	(Germany) Noel Niemann	VfL Osnabrück	9
8	(Kosovo) Albion Vrenezi	1860 Munich	9
8	(Germany) Nick Woltemade	SV Elversberg	9

=== Clean sheets ===
Rank	Player	Club	Clean sheets
1	(Germany) Daniel Batz	1. FC Saarbrücken	16
2	(Germany) Noah Atubolu	SC Freiburg II	12
3	(Germany) Marius Funk	FC Ingolstadt	11
3	(Germany) Nicolas Kristof	SV Elversberg	11
3	(Germany) Marcel Lotka	Borussia Dortmund II	11
6	(Germany) Felix Gebhardt	Hallescher FC	10
7	(Germany) Stefan Drljača	Dynamo Dresden	9
7	(Germany) Jakob Golz	Rot-Weiss Essen	9
7	(Germany) Philipp Kühn	VfL Osnabrück	9
10	(Germany) Marco Hiller	1860 Munich	8
10	(Germany) Vincent Müller	MSV Duisburg	8

== Number of teams by state ==
Position	State	Number of teams	Teams
1	North Rhine-Westphalia	5	Borussia Dortmund II, MSV Duisburg, Rot-Weiss Essen, Viktoria Köln and SC Verl
2	Bavaria	3	SpVgg Bayreuth, FC Ingolstadt and 1860 Munich,
2	Lower Saxony	3	SV Meppen, VfB Oldenburg and VfL Osnabrück
2	Saxony	3	Erzgebirge Aue, Dynamo Dresden and FSV Zwickau
5	Baden-Württemberg	2	Waldhof Mannheim and SC Freiburg II
5	Saarland	2	SV Elversberg and 1. FC Saarbrücken
7	Hesse	1	Wehen Wiesbaden
7	Saxony-Anhalt	1	Hallescher FC
