= 2025–26 3. Liga =

17th season of the 3. Liga

3. Liga
- Season: 2025–26
- Dates: 1 August 2025 – 16 May 2026
- Champions: VfL Osnabrück
- Promoted: VfL Osnabrück; Energie Cottbus
- Relegated: 1860 Munich; Erzgebirge Aue; SSV Ulm; 1. FC Schweinfurt
- Matches: 380
- Goals: 1,219 (3.21 per match)
- Top goalscorer: Lars Gindorf (28 goals)
- Biggest home win: Cottbus 5–0 Stuttgart; Mannheim 6–1 Essen; Verl 5–0 Ulm; Wiesbaden 6–1 Duisburg; Stuttgart 6–1 Essen; Aachen 6–1 Havelse
- Biggest away win: Ulm 0–5 Rostock; Havelse 0–5 Munich
- Highest scoring: Havelse 2–6 Ingolstadt; Ulm 3–5 Osnabrück; Aue 3–5 Hoffenheim; Cottbus 5–3 Essen; Rostock 5–3 Stuttgart; Ingolstadt 3–5 Aue
- Longest winning run: 7 games Osnabrück; Essen
- Longest unbeaten run: 12 games Osnabrück
- Longest winless run: 16 games Aue
- Longest losing run: 8 games Aue
- Highest attendance: 30,343; Duisburg v Köln
- Lowest attendance: 300; Stuttgart FC II v Wiesbaden; Stuttgart FC II v Havelse
- Attendance: 3,982,783 (10,481 per match)

The 2025–26 3. Liga was the 18th season of the 3. Liga. It started on 1 August 2025 and concluded on 16 May 2026.

The fixtures were announced on 3 July 2025.

After the season was over, on 3 June 2026, 1860 Munich failed to obtain a license for the upcoming season and were relegated.

== Teams ==
Locations of the 2025–26 3. Liga teams

=== Team changes ===
Promoted from 2024–25 Regionalliga	Relegated from 2024–25 2. Bundesliga	Promoted to 2025–26 2. Bundesliga	Relegated to 2025–26 Regionalliga
MSV Duisburg; TSV Havelse; TSG Hoffenheim II; 1. FC Schweinfurt	SSV Ulm; Jahn Regensburg	Arminia Bielefeld; Dynamo Dresden	Borussia Dortmund II; Hannover 96 II; SV Sandhausen; SpVgg Unterhaching

=== Stadiums and locations ===
Team	Location	Stadium	Capacity
Alemannia Aachen	Aachen	Tivoli	32,960
Erzgebirge Aue	Aue-Bad Schlema	eins Erzgebirgsstadion	16,485
Energie Cottbus	Cottbus	LEAG Energie Stadion	22,528
MSV Duisburg	Duisburg	Schauinsland-Reisen-Arena	31,514
Rot-Weiss Essen	Essen	Stadion an der Hafenstraße	19,962
TSV Havelse	Hanover	Eilenriedestadion; Heinz von Heiden Arena^{1}	5,001; 49,000
TSG Hoffenheim II	Sinsheim	Dietmar-Hopp-Stadion	6,350
FC Ingolstadt	Ingolstadt	Audi Sportpark	15,200
Viktoria Köln	Cologne	Sportpark Höhenberg	8,343
Waldhof Mannheim	Mannheim	Carl-Benz-Stadion	24,302
1860 Munich	Munich	Grünwalder Stadion	15,000
VfL Osnabrück	Osnabrück	Stadion an der Bremer Brücke	15,741
Jahn Regensburg	Regensburg	Jahnstadion Regensburg	15,210
Hansa Rostock	Rostock	Ostseestadion	29,000
1. FC Saarbrücken	Saarbrücken	Ludwigsparkstadion	16,003
1. FC Schweinfurt	Schweinfurt	Riedel Bau Arena	12,000
VfB Stuttgart II	Aspach	WIRmachenDRUCK Arena^{2}	10,001
SSV Ulm	Ulm	Donaustadion	17,400
SC Verl	Verl	Sportclub Arena	5,207
Wehen Wiesbaden	Wiesbaden	BRITA-Arena	15,295

^{1} TSV Havelse will play their home matches at the Eilenriedestadion since their home stadium, the Wilhelm-Langrehr-Stadion in Garbsen, did not meet 3. Liga standards. They will move to the Heinz von Heiden Arena for high-risk matches.
^{2} VfB Stuttgart II will play their home matches at the WIRmachenDRUCK Arena since their home stadium, the Robert-Schlienz-Stadion in Stuttgart, did not meet 3. Liga standards.

=== Personnel and kits ===
Team	Manager	Captain	Kit manufacturer	Shirt sponsor		
Team	Manager	Captain	Kit manufacturer	Front	Sleeve	Back
Alemannia Aachen	(Bosnia and Herzegovina) Mersad Selimbegović	(Germany) Mika Hanraths	Capelli Sport	None	Rotcom	Gebr. Kutsch
Erzgebirge Aue	(Georgia (country)) Khvicha Shubitidze/ (Germany) Enrico Kern	(Germany) Martin Männel	Nike	Medical Beauty Research	Erzgebirgssparkasse	G&K Innenausbau
Energie Cottbus	(Germany) Claus-Dieter Wollitz	(Germany) Axel Borgmann	Macron	LEAG	Sparkasse Spree-Neiße	Koalick
MSV Duisburg	(Germany) Dietmar Hirsch	(Germany) Alexander Hahn	Adidas	trinkgut	ZOXS	Solarwelt
Rot-Weiss Essen	(Germany) Uwe Koschinat	(Germany) Michael Schultz	Jako	ifm Electronic	Sparkasse Essen, Essener Chancen	NEObetNEO.bet
TSV Havelse	(Germany) Samir Ferchichi	(Germany) Julius Düker	Nike	enercity	None	None
TSG Hoffenheim II	(Germany) Stefan Kleineheismann	(Germany) Valentin Lässig	Joma	SAP	hep global	None
FC Ingolstadt	(Germany) Sabrina Wittmann	(Germany) Lukas Fröde	Erreà	SI Electronics	Audi Schanzer Fußballschule	PROSIS GmbH
Viktoria Köln	(Germany) Marian Wilhelm	(Germany) Christoph Greger	Joma	Peynooş	Wintec Autoglas	Oertel & Prümm
Waldhof Mannheim	(Luxembourg) Luc Holtz	(Germany) Lukas Klünter	Uhlsport	Galeria	None	PLAZA Hotelgroup
1860 Munich	(Germany) Markus Kauczinski	(Netherlands) Jesper Verlaat	Joma	Die Bayerische	Bet3000	Pangea Life
VfL Osnabrück	(Germany) Timo Schultz	(Germany) Jannik Müller	Capelli Sport	SO-TECH	JOPA	None
Jahn Regensburg	(Germany) Sascha Hildmann	(Germany) Christian Kühlwetter	Hummel	Netto	None	None
Hansa Rostock	(Germany) Daniel Brinkmann	(Germany) Franz Pfanne	Mizuno	28 Black	H2Apex	None
1. FC Saarbrücken	(Germany) Argirios Giannikis	(Germany) Sven Sonnenberg	Adidas	Victor's Group	LOTTO Saartoto	Victor's Group
1. FC Schweinfurt	(United States) Jermaine Jones	(Germany) Thomas Meißner	Capelli Sport	Wolf Möbel	HYLO	Helden-Projects
VfB Stuttgart II	(Germany) Nico Willig	(Germany) Dominik Nothnagel	Jako	Landesbank Baden-Württemberg	Porsche	None
SSV Ulm	(Bulgaria) Pavel Dochev	(Germany) Johannes Reichert	Uhlsport	Liqui Moly	B-ITE E-Recruiting	None
SC Verl	(Germany) Tobias Strobl	(Germany) Niko Kijewski	Joma	Beckhoff	EGE GmbH	None
Wehen Wiesbaden	(Germany) Daniel Scherning	(Germany) Fatih Kaya	Capelli Sport	Brita	quickpaid	None

=== Managerial changes ===
Team	Outgoing	Manner	Exit date		Position in table	Incoming	Incoming date		Ref.
Team	Outgoing	Manner	Announced on	Departed on	Position in table	Incoming	Announced on	Arrived on	Ref.
SC Verl	(Germany) Alexander Ende	End of contract	2 April 2025	30 June 2025	Pre-season	(Germany) Tobias Strobl	20 May 2025	1 July 2025	
Viktoria Köln	(Germany) Olaf Janßen	Signed by SV Sandhausen	7 May 2025	30 June 2025	Pre-season	(Germany) Marian Wilhelm	29 May 2025	1 July 2025	
Jahn Regensburg	(Germany) Munier Raychouni	End of tenure as caretaker	8 May 2025	30 June 2025	Pre-season	(Germany) Michael Wimmer	23 May 2025	1 July 2025	
VfL Osnabrück	(Germany) Marco Antwerpen	Sacked	30 May 2025	30 June 2025	Pre-season	(Germany) Timo Schultz	17 June 2025	1 July 2025	
TSG Hoffenheim II	(Germany) Vincent Wagner	Signed by SV Elversberg	5 June 2025	30 June 2025	Pre-season	(Germany) Stefan Kleineheismann	9 June 2025	1 July 2025	
VfB Stuttgart II	(Germany) Markus Fiedler	Signed by 1. FC Magdeburg	15 June 2025	30 June 2025	Pre-season	(Germany) Nico Willig	15 June 2025	1 July 2025	
Alemannia Aachen	(Germany) Heiner Backhaus	Signed by Eintracht Braunschweig	17 June 2025	30 June 2025	Pre-season	(Germany) Benedetto Muzzicato	25 June 2025	1 July 2025	
Waldhof Mannheim	(Austria) Dominik Glawogger	Sacked	11 August 2025		14th	(Luxembourg) Luc Holtz	12 August 2025		
SSV Ulm	(Germany) Robert Lechleiter	Sacked	18 September 2025		15th	(Germany) Moritz Glasbrenner	18 September 2025		
1860 Munich	(Germany) Patrick Glöckner	Sacked	28 September 2025		10th	(Germany) Alper Kayabunar	28 September 2025		
1860 Munich	(Germany) Alper Kayabunar	End of tenure as caretaker	9 October 2025		13th	(Germany) Markus Kauczinski	9 October 2025		
Alemannia Aachen	(Germany) Benedetto Muzzicato	Sacked	20 October 2025		18th	(Germany) Ilyas Trenz (caretaker)	20 October 2025		
Wehen Wiesbaden	(Germany) Nils Döring	Sacked	25 October 2025		11th	(Germany) Frank Steinmetz (caretaker)	25 October 2025		
Alemannia Aachen	(Germany) Ilyas Trenz	End of tenure as caretaker	6 November 2025		11th	(Bosnia and Herzegovina) Mersad Selimbegović	6 November 2025		
Wehen Wiesbaden	(Germany) Frank Steinmetz	End of tenure as caretaker	10 November 2025		13th	(Germany) Daniel Scherning	10 November 2025		
SSV Ulm	(Germany) Moritz Glasbrenner	Sacked	10 November 2025		18th	(Bulgaria) Pavel Dochev	16 November 2025		
1. FC Saarbrücken	(Germany) Alois Schwartz	Mutual consent	25 November 2025		13th	(Germany) Jürgen Luginger	25 November 2025		
Erzgebirge Aue	(Germany) Jens Härtel	Sacked	31 January 2026		17th	(Germany) Christoph Dabrowski	3 February 2026		
1. FC Saarbrücken	(Germany) Jürgen Luginger	Sacked	11 February 2026		16th	(Germany) Argirios Giannikis	11 February 2026		
1. FC Schweinfurt	(Germany) Victor Kleinhenz	Sacked	18 February 2026		20th	(United States) Jermaine Jones	18 February 2026		
Jahn Regensburg	(Germany) Michael Wimmer	Mutual consent	9 March 2026		14th	(Germany) Munier Raychouni (caretaker)	9 March 2026		
Jahn Regensburg	(Germany) Munier Raychouni	End of tenure as caretaker	31 March 2026		12th	(Germany) Sascha Hildmann	31 March 2026		
Erzgebirge Aue	(Germany) Christoph Dabrowski	Sacked	5 April 2026		18th	(Georgia (country)) Khvicha Shubitidze/ (Germany) Enrico Kern	5 April 2026		

== League table ==
Pos	Team	Pld	W	D	L	GF	GA	GD	Pts	Promotion, qualification or relegation
1	VfL Osnabrück (C, P)	38	24	8	6	66	34	+32	80	Promotion to 2. Bundesliga and qualification for DFB-Pokal
2	Energie Cottbus (P)	38	21	9	8	72	51	+21	72	Promotion to 2. Bundesliga and qualification for DFB-Pokal
3	Rot-Weiss Essen	38	20	10	8	78	66	+12	70	Qualification for promotion play-offs and DFB-Pokal
4	MSV Duisburg	38	19	11	8	66	49	+17	68	Qualification for DFB-Pokal
5	Hansa Rostock	38	18	13	7	74	49	+25	67	
6	SC Verl	38	18	10	10	82	48	+34	64	
7	Alemannia Aachen	38	19	7	12	76	57	+19	64	
8	1860 Munich (Note: 1860 Munich originally finished the season in eighth place, but were administratively relegated to the Regionalliga Bayern after failing to obtain a license for the upcoming 3. Liga season, sparing TSV Havelse from relegation.) (R)	38	15	11	12	54	53	+1	56	Relegation to Regionalliga
9	Wehen Wiesbaden	38	15	8	15	54	52	+2	53	
10	Waldhof Mannheim	38	15	7	16	59	72	−13	52	
11	Viktoria Köln	38	15	6	17	51	53	−2	51	
12	FC Ingolstadt	38	13	10	15	65	56	+9	49	
13	Jahn Regensburg	38	14	7	17	54	58	−4	49	
14	VfB Stuttgart II (Note: Reserve teams are ineligible for promotion or DFB-Pokal qualification.)	38	13	7	18	57	69	−12	46	
15	1. FC Saarbrücken	38	10	14	14	51	57	−6	44	
16	TSG Hoffenheim II	38	12	7	19	65	71	−6	43	
17	TSV Havelse	38	9	8	21	57	89	−32	35	Spared from relegation
18	Erzgebirge Aue (R)	38	7	13	18	51	70	−19	34	Relegation to Regionalliga
19	SSV Ulm (R)	38	9	6	23	49	78	−29	33	Relegation to Regionalliga
20	1. FC Schweinfurt (R)	38	5	6	27	38	87	−49	21	Relegation to Regionalliga

Source: DFB
Rules for classification: 1) Points; 2) Goal difference; 3) Goals scored; 4) Head-to-head results; 5) Head-to-head away goals scored; 6) Away goals scored; 7) Play-off.
(C) Champions; (P) Promoted; (R) Relegated

== Results ==
Home \ Away	AAC	AUE	COT	DUI	ESS	HAV	HOF	ING	KÖL	MAN	MUN	OSN	REG	ROS	SAA	SCH	STU	ULM	VER	WIE
Alemannia Aachen	—	0–1	4–1	3–1	3–3	6–1	2–4	0–1	0–3	3–2	0–2	0–3	0–2	1–1	2–0	1–0	3–1	1–3	3–1	3–0
Erzgebirge Aue	1–3	—	1–2	0–0	2–2	2–1	3–5	2–2	0–3	0–2	2–0	1–3	4–3	0–0	0–0	4–0	0–0	0–3	1–1	2–2
Energie Cottbus	3–2	2–1	—	3–2	5–3	4–3	3–1	1–1	3–2	1–1	3–0	0–1	2–2	0–0	3–3	2–1	5–0	1–1	0–0	2–1
MSV Duisburg	3–1	0–0	2–1	—	1–1	1–1	3–1	2–1	1–1	2–1	2–1	1–0	2–0	2–2	4–2	3–1	2–1	2–1	4–2	3–1
Rot-Weiss Essen	2–3	4–2	2–3	1–0	—	4–1	3–1	4–1	1–0	1–0	1–1	1–1	3–2	3–0	1–2	2–1	1–1	3–2	1–0	1–1
TSV Havelse	1–1	3–1	0–3	1–1	1–1	—	4–0	2–6	3–2	2–3	0–5	0–2	1–2	1–3	2–0	3–2	3–2	2–1	2–2	0–2
TSG Hoffenheim II	2–3	1–1	4–1	4–1	2–4	0–0	—	0–3	1–3	2–0	1–2	0–1	1–0	2–2	3–2	1–1	1–3	1–1	2–4	3–1
FC Ingolstadt	1–2	3–5	0–0	0–0	1–2	3–2	3–2	—	1–2	5–1	1–2	0–1	1–1	1–1	2–1	2–3	2–1	4–1	1–2	0–0
Viktoria Köln	0–3	2–2	0–2	0–0	1–2	4–1	2–1	3–1	—	1–3	0–1	0–0	1–0	2–4	2–0	2–0	2–0	0–1	1–5	2–1
Waldhof Mannheim	2–1	2–1	0–3	1–4	6–1	3–1	1–1	2–2	2–0	—	3–1	1–4	1–0	0–4	2–1	2–2	0–1	2–1	2–2	1–0
1860 Munich	2–2	2–1	3–0	3–1	1–1	3–2	1–5	1–2	2–2	1–1	—	3–1	2–2	1–0	2–0	3–1	1–1	3–2	0–2	0–0
VfL Osnabrück	0–0	3–1	1–0	0–0	3–0	2–0	0–4	1–0	2–0	4–1	1–1	—	2–0	0–0	2–0	4–0	1–2	1–1	2–1	0–1
Jahn Regensburg	1–3	1–0	0–1	0–4	1–3	5–2	2–1	0–3	0–0	3–0	4–0	0–2	—	0–3	1–1	3–0	3–2	1–1	2–0	2–1
Hansa Rostock	2–2	2–1	1–3	5–1	3–2	1–1	0–1	0–3	2–3	1–0	2–1	2–2	2–5	—	2–1	2–0	5–3	5–1	2–2	3–0
1. FC Saarbrücken	1–1	4–1	1–1	0–0	2–3	1–1	2–2	1–0	2–1	2–0	0–0	0–1	1–1	3–4	—	2–1	2–0	3–1	2–4	2–0
1. FC Schweinfurt	1–5	2–4	0–2	0–3	1–3	2–3	2–1	1–1	2–0	2–3	1–1	1–2	0–1	0–0	2–2	—	3–1	3–2	1–2	0–1
VfB Stuttgart II	1–3	2–2	1–2	0–4	6–1	2–1	1–0	2–1	2–1	3–1	2–1	3–4	3–1	0–1	1–3	3–0	—	1–1	1–1	0–0
SSV Ulm	1–3	1–0	1–2	1–0	2–3	2–1	1–3	1–3	0–2	1–2	0–1	3–5	2–1	0–5	1–1	5–1	1–3	—	1–0	0–1
SC Verl	2–1	1–1	2–1	2–3	0–0	4–0	3–1	2–2	2–0	5–2	3–0	4–1	1–2	1–2	3–0	4–0	4–0	5–0	—	2–2
Wehen Wiesbaden	1–2	3–1	3–1	6–1	3–4	1–4	2–0	2–1	0–1	3–3	1–0	2–3	2–0	0–1	1–1	2–0	2–1	3–1	2–1	—

Source: DFB
Legend: Blue = home team win; Yellow = draw; Red = away team win.

== Statistics ==
=== Top scorers ===
Rank	Player	Club	Goals
1	(Germany) Lars Gindorf	Alemannia Aachen	28
2	(Germany) Erik Engelhardt	Energie Cottbus	22
3	(Germany) Mika Schroers	Alemannia Aachen	21
4	(Germany) Marcel Costly	FC Ingolstadt	18
5	(Germany) Tolcay Ciğerci	Energie Cottbus	17
5	(Germany) Lex-Tyger Lobinger	Viktoria Köln/MSV Duisburg	17
5	(Germany) Berkan Taz	SC Verl	17
8	(Norway) Sigurd Haugen	1860 Munich	16
8	(Germany) Felix Lohkemper	Waldhof Mannheim	16
10	(Denmark) Emil Holten	Hansa Rostock	15
10	(Germany) Deniz Zeitler	TSG Hoffenheim II	15

=== Hat-tricks ===
Player	Club	Against	Result	Date
(Germany) Lars Gindorf	Alemannia Aachen	Rot-Weiss Essen	3–2 (A)	31 August 2025
(Germany) Mika Schroers	Alemannia Aachen	Schweinfurt 05	5–1 (A)	27 September 2025
(Germany) Nicklas Shipnoski	Waldhof Mannheim	Rot-Weiss Essen	6–1 (H)	27 September 2025
(Germany) Marek Janssen	Rot-Weiss Essen	TSV Havelse	4–1 (H)	24 January 2026
(Germany) Fatih Kaya^{4}	Wehen Wiesbaden	MSV Duisburg	6–1 (H)	14 February 2026
(Germany) Felix Lohkemper	Waldhof Mannheim	TSV Havelse	3–1 (H)	8 March 2026
(Denmark) Emil Holten	Hansa Rostock	MSV Duisburg	5–1 (H)	14 March 2026
(Germany) Mika Schroers	Alemannia Aachen	Wehen Wiesbaden	3–0 (H)	5 April 2026
(Germany) Erik Engelhardt	Energie Cottbus	1860 Munich	3–0 (H)	7 April 2026
(Germany) Tolcay Ciğerci	Energie Cottbus	Rot-Weiss Essen	5–3 (H)	19 April 2026
(Germany) Eric Hottmann^{4}	Jahn Regensburg	Hansa Rostock	5–2 (A)	25 April 2026
(Ecuador) Jeremy Arévalo	VfB Stuttgart II	Rot-Weiss Essen	6–1 (H)	2 May 2026
(Germany) Julian Guttau	Erzgebirge Aue	FC Ingolstadt	5–3 (A)	3 May 2026
(Germany) Yann Sturm	FC Ingolstadt	Waldhof Mannheim	5–1 (H)	16 May 2026
(Germany) Lars Gindorf	Alemannia Aachen	TSV Havelse	6–1 (H)	16 May 2026

- ^{4} Players scored four goals.

=== Clean sheets ===
Rank	Player	Club	Clean sheets
1	(Sweden) Lukas Jonsson	VfL Osnabrück	19
2	(Germany) Benjamin Uphoff	Hansa Rostock	12
3	(Germany) Maximilian Braune	MSV Duisburg	11
4	(Germany) Thomas Dähne	1860 Munich	9
4	(Germany) Marius Funk	Energie Cottbus	9
4	(Germany) Philipp Schulze	SC Verl	9
7	(Germany) Felix Gebhardt	Jahn Regensburg	8
8	(Germany) Phillip Menzel	1. FC Saarbrücken	7
8	(Germany) Arne Schulz	Viktoria Köln	7
10	(Germany) Kai Eisele	FC Ingolstadt	6
10	(Germany) Florian Stritzel	Wehen Wiesbaden	6
