= Felix Gebhardt =

German association football player (born 2002)

Personal information
- Full name: Felix Karl-Ernst Gebhardt
- Date of birth: 1 March 2002 (age 24)
- Place of birth: Lörrach, Germany
- Height: 1.89 m (6 ft 2 in)
- Position: Goalkeeper

Team information
- Current team: Lugano
- Number: 28

Youth career
- –2015: FV Lörrach-Brombach
- 2015–2022: FC Basel

Senior career*
Years	Team	Apps	(Gls)
2022–2023	FC Basel	0	(0)
2022–2023	→ Hallescher FC (loan)	36	(0)
2023–2026	Jahn Regensburg	90	(0)
2026–	Lugano	2	(0)
- * Club domestic league appearances and goals as of 28 September 2026

Felix Karl-Ernst Gebhardt (born 1 March 2002) is a German professional footballer who plays as a goalkeeper for Swiss Super League club Lugano. He is a former Germany youth international.

== Club career ==
He is from Steinen, Baden-Württemberg and trained at FV Lörrach-Brombach prior to joining the youth academy of Swiss club Basem in 2015, eventually signing a professional contract with the club. He joined Hallescher FC on loan for the 2022–23 season. He made 36 league appearances for Hallescher before joining Jahn Regensburg in July 2023 on a permanent three-year deal.

He was part of the Jahn Regensburg side which won promotion to the 2. Bundesliga from the 3. Liga in the 2023–24 season, winning the decisive play-off tie against SV Wehen Wiesbaden.

== International career ==
He represented Germany at under-16 level in 2017. In 2023, he was called-up to the Germany national under-21 football team.

== Career statistics ==
=== Club ===
As of match played 16 March 2026

Appearances and goals by club, season and competition
Club	Season	League			National Cup (Note: Includes Swiss Cup, DFB-Pokal)		Continental		Other		Total	
Club	Season	Division	Apps	Goals	Apps	Goals	Apps	Goals	Apps	Goals	Apps	Goals
FC Basel	2020–21	Swiss Super League	0	0	0	0	0	0	—		0	0
FC Basel	2021–22	Swiss Super League	0	0	2	0	0	0	—		2	0
FC Basel	Total		0	0	2	0	0	0	—		2	0
Hallescher FC (loan)	2022–23	3. Liga	36	0	—		—		—		36	0
Jahn Regensburg	2023–24	3. Liga	30	0	1	0	—		2 (Note: Appearance(s) in 2. Bundesliga Promotion/Relegation play-offs)	0	33	0
Jahn Regensburg	2024–25	2. Bundesliga	24	0	3	0	—		—		27	0
Jahn Regensburg	2025–26	3. Liga	36	0	1	0	—		—		37	0
Jahn Regensburg	Total		90	0	5	0	—		2	0	97	0
Career total			126	0	7	0	0	0	2	0	135	0
