= Ronny Thielemann =

German footballer (born 1973)

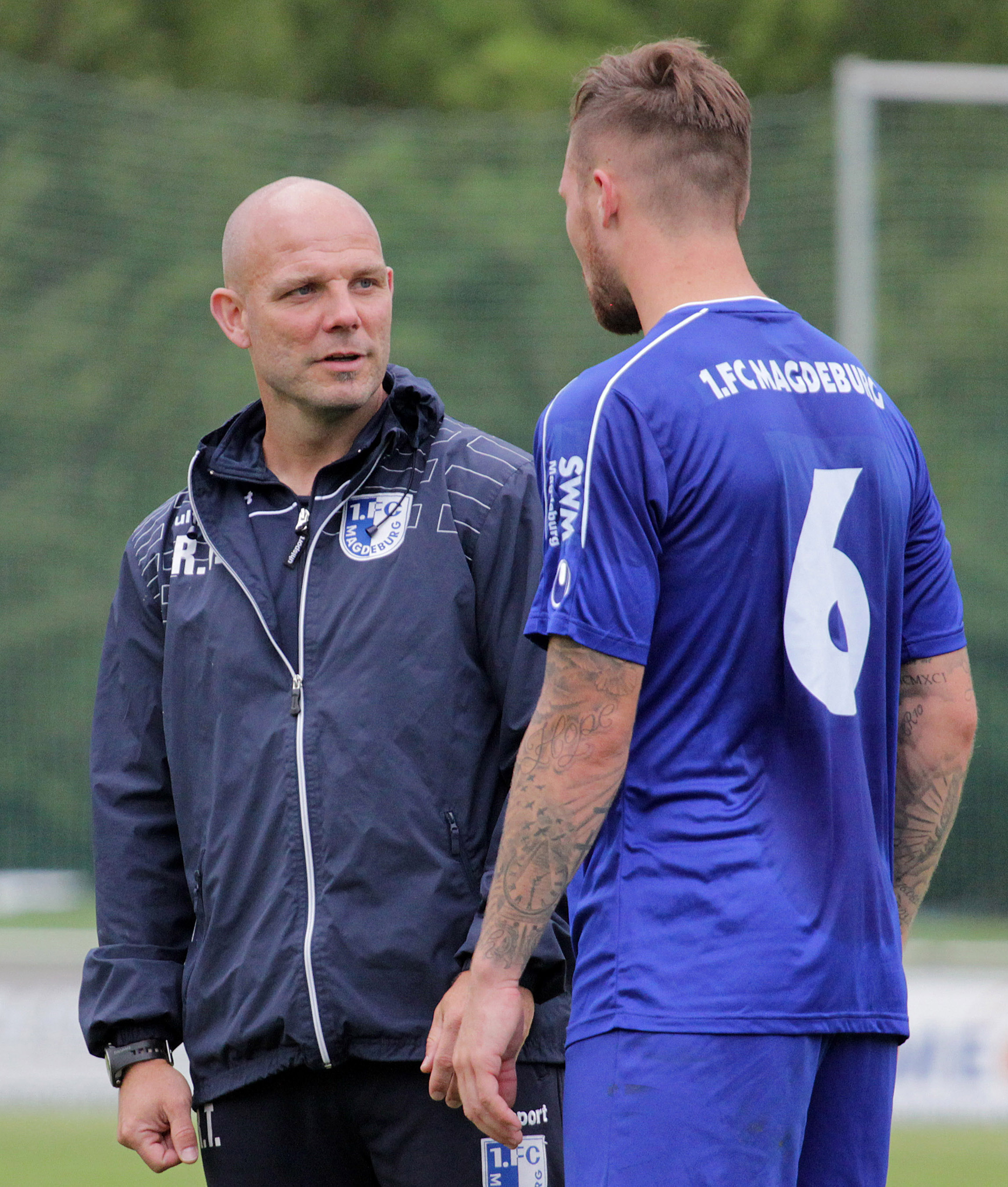
- Thielemann in 2015

Personal information
- Date of birth: 15 November 1973 (age 52)
- Place of birth: Schlema, East Germany
- Height: 1.74 m (5 ft 9 in)
- Position: Midfielder

Team information
- Current team: Eintracht Braunschweig (assistant manager)

Youth career
- –1983: FC Karl-Marx-Stadt
- 1983–1992: Wismut Aue

Senior career*
Years	Team	Apps	(Gls)
1992–1999	Erzgebirge Aue	120	(8)
1999–2000	Hansa Rostock	7	(0)
2000–2003	Energie Cottbus	33	(0)
2004	FC Sachsen Leipzig	36	(1)
2005–2007	Carl Zeiss Jena	63	(3)
2006–2007	Carl Zeiss Jena II	2	(0)
2007–2010	Energie Cottbus II	56	(3)
Total		317	(12)

Managerial career
- 2011–2012: 1. FC Magdeburg
- 2023: FSV Zwickau
- 2023–: Eintracht Braunschweig (assistant)
- * Club domestic league appearances and goals

Ronny Thielemann (born 15 November 1973) is a German professional football coach and a former player. He is an assistant manager with Eintracht Braunschweig.

In March 2018, Thielemann acquired the football instructor license at the German Football Association.

== Playing career ==
Thielemann was born in Schlema. He played 39 games in the Bundesliga for Hansa Rostock and Energie Cottbus.

== Coaching career ==
Thielemann begang his coaching career with Energie Cottbus II as an assistant manager from April 2008 to June 2010. He then worked one year as the manager Erzgebirge Aue's U19 squad, before he in July 2011 was appointed as the assistant manager of 1. FC Magdeburg. On 25 October 2011, he took over the team after manager Wolfgang Sandhowe was sacked. He held the job until 20 March 2012 where a new manager was appointed.

In the next two years, Thielemann worked with the U17 and U19 teams at the club. From the 2014–15 season, he was appointed as the assistant manager for the first team again, this time under manager Jens Härtel. On 12 November 2018, both manager Härtel and Thielemann himself was released.

Härtel and Thielemann continued together in the new year, when Härtel was appointed as the manager of Hansa Rostock on 9 January 2019, where he took Thielemann with him as his assistant.

In February 2023, he was appointed as the new head coach of FSV Zwickau.
