= Lukas Pfeiffer =

German football manager (born 1991)

Lukas Pfeiffer (born 16 January 1991) is a German football manager. He previously managed VfB Lübeck in Schleswig-Holstein.

== Early life and education ==
Pfeiffer is a native of Lüneburg. He started training as an airline pilot in Bremen, but switched to studying sports science in Cologne. He earned a certificate as an analyst from the German Football Association, and served as a video analyst for the Germany national U17 football team. Although he was enrolled in a course for a UEFA A license, he was unable to complete it due to the COVID-19 pandemic.

== Career ==
In 2020, Pfeiffer joined German club VfG Lübeck as an assistant manager.

In 2021, Pfeiffer was appointed head coach of VfB Lübeck. During the 2022–2023 season, he led the team to promotion to the 3. Liga, the third division of football in Germany. Lübeck finished as champions in Regionalliga Nord, and also won the state cup.

VfB Lübeck decided to risk sanctions by keeping Lübeck as manager, despite the fact that he lacked a UEFA Pro license, which is mandatory for coaches in the third division. He was sacked in December 2023, after managing only two wins in eighteen matches.
