= Carsten Müller (footballer) =

German footballer (born 1971)

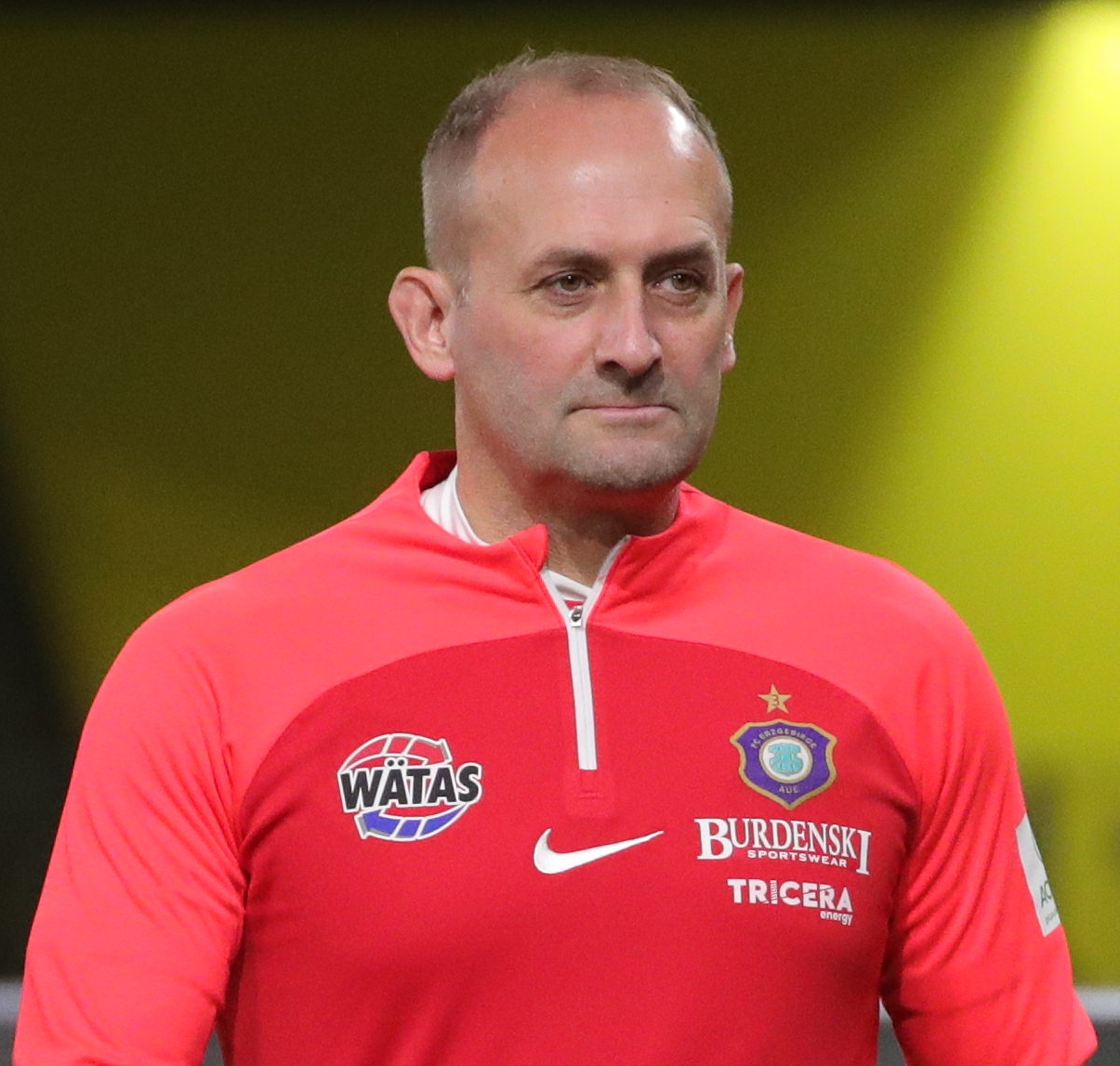
- Müller in 2022

Personal information
- Date of birth: 3 October 1971 (age 55)
- Place of birth: Burg bei Magdeburg, East Germany
- Position: Defender

Senior career*
Years	Team	Apps	(Gls)
1989–1994	1. FC Magdeburg		

International career
	East Germany U18	9	(0)

Managerial career
- 2010: 1. FC Magdeburg (caretaker)
- 2011: 1. FC Magdeburg II (caretaker)
- 2012: 1. FC Magdeburg (caretaker)
- 2022: Erzgebirge Aue (caretaker)
- * Club domestic league appearances and goals

Carsten Müller (born 3 October 1971) is a German football manager and former player.

== Playing career ==
Born in Burg bei Magdeburg, East Germany Müller made nine appearances for the East Germany under-18 national team. From 1989 to 1994 he played as a defender for 1. FC Magdeburg in the DDR-Oberliga and lower leagues.

== Managerial career ==
Beginning in 2007 Müller held various academy positions with 1. FC Magdeburg. He left the club in January 2015 to join FC Erzgebirge Aue as a youth coach. While serving as the head of the youth academy, he was named interim co-trainer of the first team in October 2021. He served alongside Marc Hensel who, at 35 years old, did not yet hold the required coaching badge. They were replaced on 23 February 2022. In September 2022, he was appointed as the interim manager of Erzgebirge Aue. The spell ended in December 2022.
