= Tim Schreiber =

German footballer (born 2002)

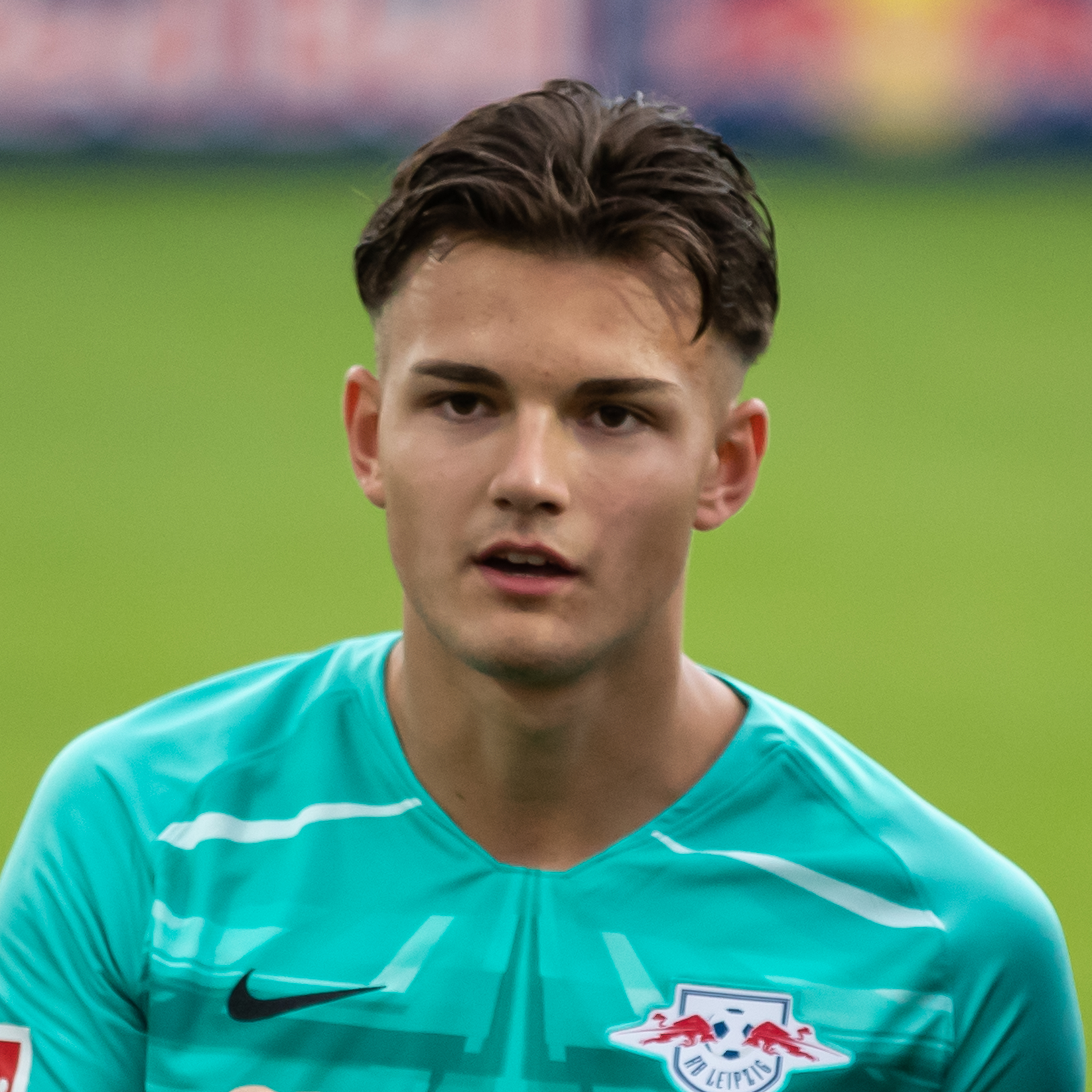
- Schreiber with RB Leipzig in 2019

Personal information
- Full name: Tim Stanislaw Schreiber
- Date of birth: 24 April 2002 (age 24)
- Place of birth: Freital, Germany
- Height: 1.91 m (6 ft 3 in)
- Position: Goalkeeper

Team information
- Current team: Dynamo Dresden
- Number: 1

Youth career
- –2014: SC Borea Dresden
- 2014–2021: RB Leipzig

Senior career*
Years	Team	Apps	(Gls)
2021–2024	RB Leipzig	0	(0)
2021–2022	→ Hallescher FC (loan)	25	(0)
2022–2023	→ Holstein Kiel (loan)	10	(0)
2023	→ Holstein Kiel II (loan)	2	(0)
2023–2024	→ FC Saarbrücken (loan)	24	(0)
2024–	Dynamo Dresden	65	(0)

International career^{‡}
2017	Germany U15	1	(0)
2018	Germany U16	3	(0)
2018–2019	Germany U17	10	(0)
2021–	Germany U20	1	(0)
- * Club domestic league appearances and goals as of 18 May 2026 ‡ National team caps and goals as of 20:59, 11 October 2021 (UTC)

Tim Stanislaw Schreiber (born 24 April 2002) is a German professional footballer who plays as a goalkeeper for 2. Bundesliga club Dynamo Dresden. He also represents the Germany under-20 team.

== Club career ==
On 14 May 2024, Schreiber signed with Dynamo Dresden.
