= Heiko Scholz =

German footballer (born 1966)

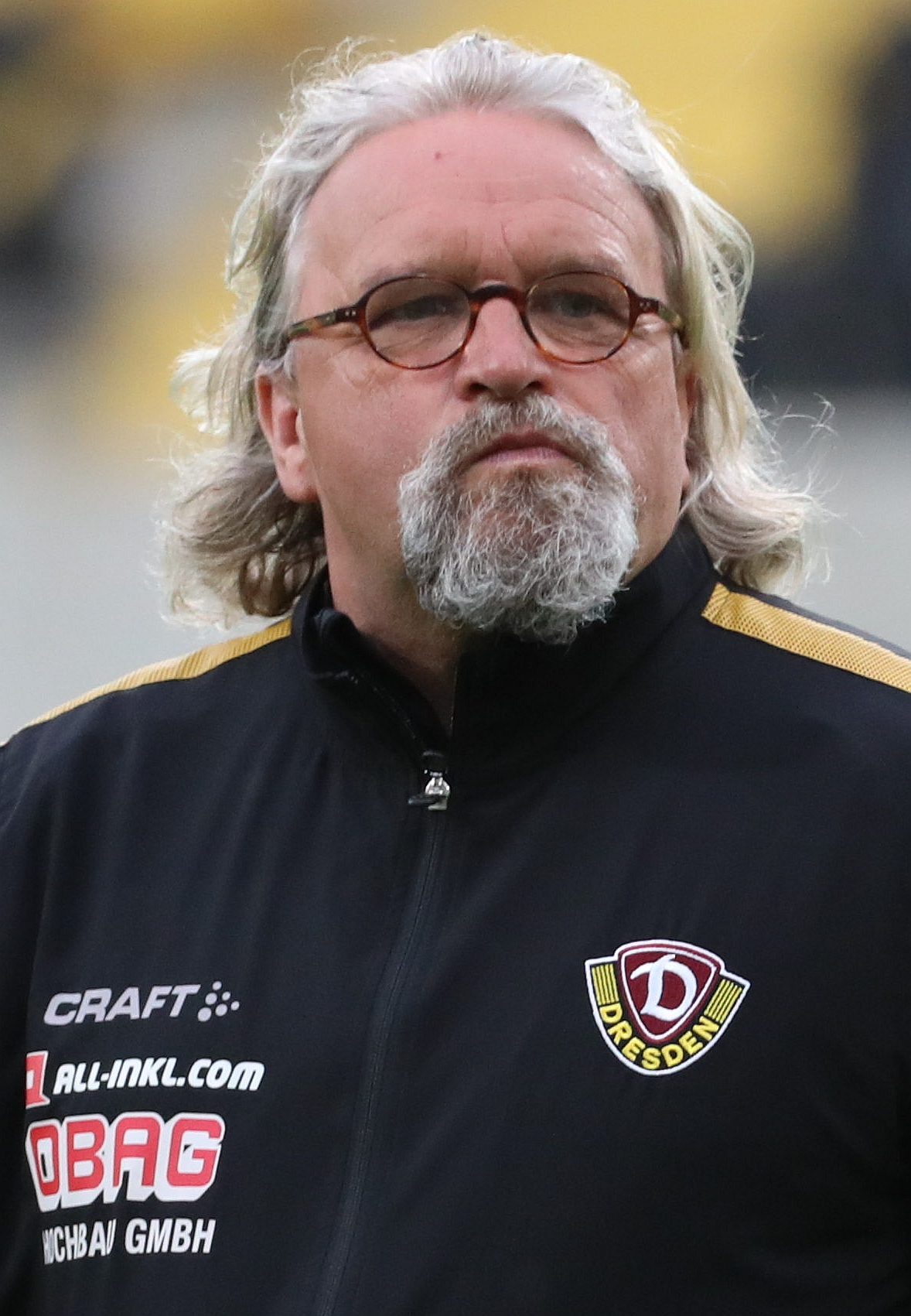
- Scholz with Dynamo Dresden in 2021

Personal information
- Date of birth: 7 January 1966 (age 60)
- Place of birth: Görlitz, East Germany
- Position: Right wing-back

Team information
- Current team: Dynamo Dresden (assistant head coach)

Youth career
- 1972–1978: BSG Dynamo Görlitz
- 1978–1982: Dynamo Dresden
- 1982–1984: ISG Hagenwerder

Senior career*
Years	Team	Apps	(Gls)
1984–1986	Chemie Leipzig	58	(15)
1986–1990	Lokomotive Leipzig	86	(2)
1990–1992	Dynamo Dresden	57	(8)
1992–1995	Bayer Leverkusen	75	(5)
1995–1998	Werder Bremen	52	(2)
1998	Fortuna Köln	20	(0)
1998–1999	SG Wattenscheid	9	(0)
1999–2000	Dresdner SC	9	(0)
Total		366	(32)

International career
1987–1990	East Germany	7	(0)
1992	Germany	1	(0)

Managerial career
- 2005: MSV Duisburg (interim)
- 2006: MSV Duisburg (interim)
- 2010–2011: TSV Germania Windeck
- 2011–2012: Viktoria Köln
- 2013–2018: Lokomotive Leipzig
- 2018–2019: Wacker Nordhausen
- 2019: Dynamo Dresden (interim)
- 2024: Dynamo Dresden (interim)
- * Club domestic league appearances and goals

Heiko Scholz (born 7 January 1966) is a German football manager and former professional football player who is the assistant head coach of 2. Bundesliga club Dynamo Dresden.

== Club career ==
Heiko Scholz was part of one of only three East German club sides which reached a final in a European cup competition: He lost the Cup Winners' Cup Final in 1987 with Lokomotive Leipzig against Ajax. In East and unified Germany the midfielder played 296 top-flight matches.

== International career ==
Scholz represented both East Germany (seven caps) and unified Germany (one cap) internationally.

== Coaching career ==
=== MSV Duisburg ===
Scholz was interim coach of MSV Duisburg twice during the 2005–06 season. The first stint was from 8 December 2005 to 17 December 2005. Duisburg drew 1–1 against Arminia Bielefeld on 10 December 2005 and drew 1–1 against 1. FSV Mainz 05. The second stint was from 4 April 2006 to 30 June 2006. He finished that stint with a record of one win, two draws, and three losses. During the 2008–09 season, Scholz became interim coach for a third time at Duisburg. He was interim coach from 10 November 2008 to 16 November 2008 where he lost his only match in–charge 4–3 to Greuther Fürth.

=== Germania Windeck and Viktoria Köln ===
Scholz went on to coach Germania Windeck from 4 January 2010 to 30 June 2011. His first match in–charge was a 1–1 draw against SSVg Velbert. Germania Windeck finished the 2010–11 NRW-Liga in second place and was promoted. They were also knocked out of the 2010–11 DFB-Pokal by Bayern Munich.

Scholz coached Viktoria Köln from 1 July 2011 to 12 November 2012. In the 2011–12 season, Viktoria Köln finished in first place and were promoted. Scholz left the club on 12 November 2012. His last match was a 2–2 draw against SC Verl.

=== Lokomotive Leipzig ===
Scholz coached Lokomotive Leipzig from 7 October 2013 to 23 September 2018. His first match was a 2–0 loss in a Saxony Cup match against RB Leipzig. Lokomotive Leipzig were relegated from the Regionalliga Nordost. Lokomotive Leipzig played in the Oberliga NOFV-Süd in the 2014–15 season where they finished in fourth place, one spot below the Promotion playoff spot. They again played in the Oberliga NOFV-Süd in the 2015–16 season where they went undefeated and were promoted back to the Regionalliga Nordost. Lokomotive Leipzig finished in 10th place in the 2016–17 Regionalliga Nordost season and lost in the Saxony Cup final to Chemnitzer FC. Lokomotive Leipzig finished the 2017–18 season in sixth place and were el Round of 16 in the Saxony Cup. He left Lokomotive Leipzig on 23 September 2018, a day after a 1–0 loss to Germania Halberstadt.

He was coach of Wacker Nordhausen from 1 January 2019 to 2 December 2019. His first match was a 3–2 win against Bischofswerdaer FV. His final match was a 1–0 loss to Viktoria Berlin on 1 December 2019.

=== Dynamo Dresden ===
was hired as an interim coach for Dynamo Dresden on 3 December 2019 to 9 December 2019. He remained with Dynamo Dresden as an assistant coach when Markus Kauczinski was hired as the new coach. His only match in–charge was a 1–1 draw against SV Sandhausen. He was promoted by Dynamo Dresden on 20 April 2024 to interim coach after a 2–0 loss to Viktoria Köln on 20 April 2024. His first match was a 1–1 draw against Jahn Regensburg.

== Coaching record ==
As of match played 25 May 2024

Team	From	To	Record								Ref.
Team	From	To	M	W	D	L	GF	GA	GD	Win %	Ref.
MSV Duisburg	8 December 2005	17 December 2005	2	0	2	0	2	2	+0	0.00	
MSV Duisburg	4 April 2006	30 June 2006	6	1	2	3	7	11	−4	16.67	
MSV Duisburg	10 November 2008	16 November 2008	1	0	0	1	3	4	−1	0.00	
Germania Windeck	4 January 2010	30 June 2011	50	29	10	11	88	60	+28	58.00	
Viktoria Köln	1 July 2011	12 November 2012	49	36	6	7	139	41	+98	73.47	
Lokomotive Leipzig	7 October 2013	23 September 2018	167	79	45	43	277	169	+108	47.31	
Wacker Nordhausen	1 January 2019	2 December 2019	37	23	3	11	88	53	+35	62.16	
Dynamo Dresden	3 December 2019	9 December 2019	1	0	1	0	1	1	+0	0.00	
Dynamo Dresden	20 April 2024	19 May 2024	5	3	1	1	9	3	+6	60.00	
Total			318	171	70	77	614	344	+270	53.77	—
