= Rüdiger Ziehl =

German footballer and manager

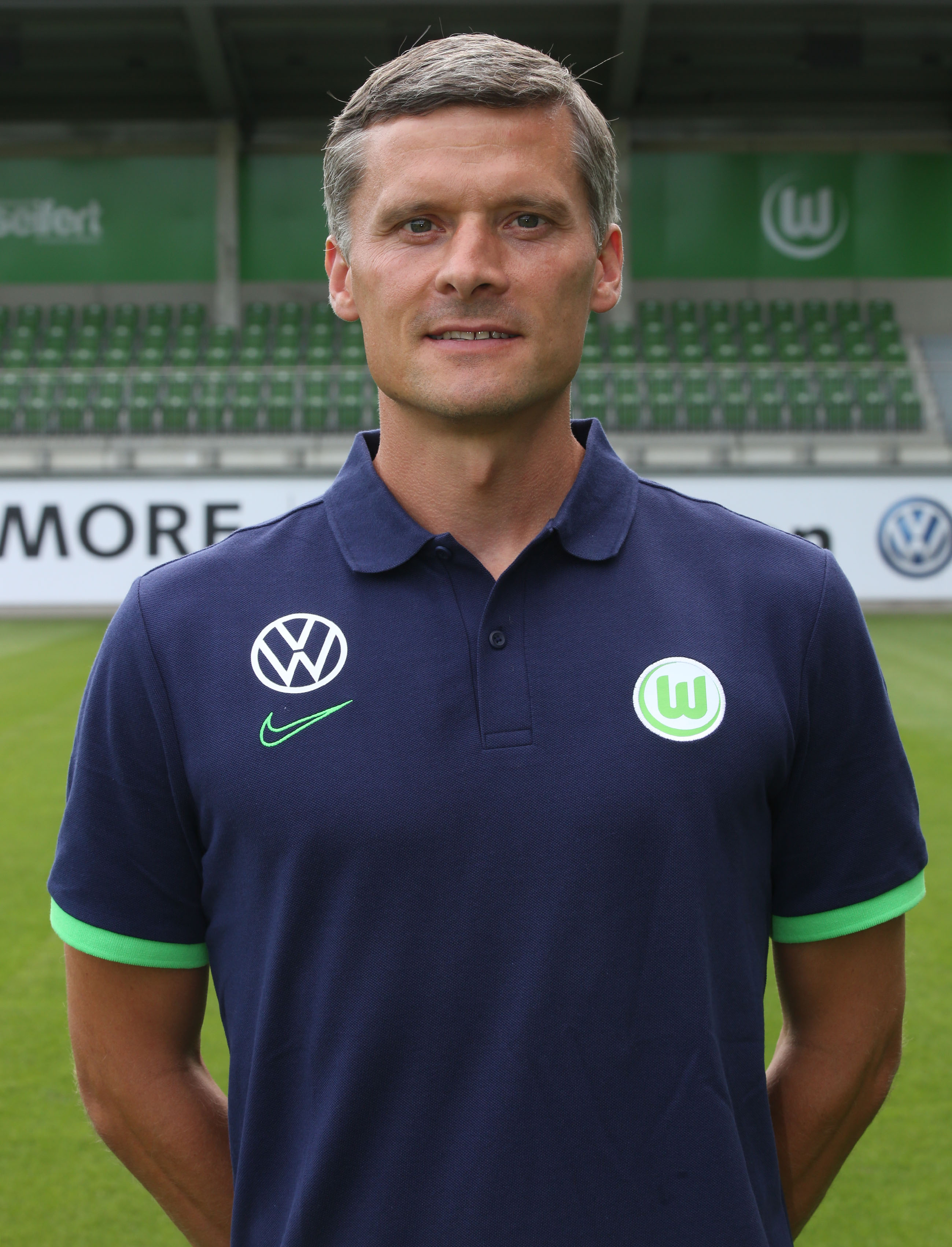
- Ziehl in 2019

Personal information
- Date of birth: 26 October 1977 (age 49)
- Place of birth: Zweibrücken, Germany
- Height: 1.84 m (6 ft 0 in)
- Position: Defensive midfielder

Youth career
- SG Rieschweiler-Stambach

Senior career*
Years	Team	Apps	(Gls)
–2000	FK Pirmasens		
2000–2001	1. FC Kaiserslautern	3	(0)
2001–2002	1. FC Kaiserslautern II	29	(0)
2002–2004	SV Wehen Wiesbaden	45	(1)
2004–2009	TuS Koblenz	106	(8)
2009–2012	VfL Wolfsburg II	17	(2)
Total		200	(11)

Managerial career
- 2012–2013: VfL Wolfsburg II (interim)
- 2016: VfL Wolfsburg II (interim)
- 2016–2020: VfL Wolfsburg II
- 2021–2022: TSV Havelse
- 2022–2025: 1. FC Saarbrücken
- * Club domestic league appearances and goals

Rüdiger Ziehl (born 26 October 1977) is a German football manager and former player who last managed 1. FC Saarbrücken.

== Playing career ==
Ziehl was born in Zweibrücken. He made his debut on the professional league level in the Bundesliga for 1. FC Kaiserslautern on 11 March 2001 when he came on as a substitute in the 83rd minute in a game against 1860 Munich.

== Managerial career ==
Ziehl ended his active career in 2012 and was named assistant manager at his last club, VfL Wolfsburg II. After four years as an assistant and two stints as interim manager, he was named head coach in 2016. He left the club in 2020.

On 28 June 2021, Ziehl was named head coach of 3. Liga club TSV Havelse starting in the 2021–22 season. A year later he was appointed as the intertim; later permanent manager of 1. FC Saarbrücken. Saarbrücken finished in fifth place in the 2022–23 season, qualifying for the DFB-Pokal. This became important as he led Saarbrücken to a miraculous run in the 2023–24 DFB-Pokal, eliminating three Bundesliga sides; including reigning Bundesliga champions Bayern Munich, reigning DFB Pokal runners-up Eintracht Frankfurt and Borussia Monchengladbach in the process to reach the semi-finals of the competition for the first time since 2019–20 season whilst being in the 3.Liga. They were defeated by his former club 1. FC Kaiserslautern a 2. Bundesliga side in the semi-finals. He moved to a managerial role at Saarbrücken in April 2025.
