= Gerhard Kleppinger =

German football player and manager

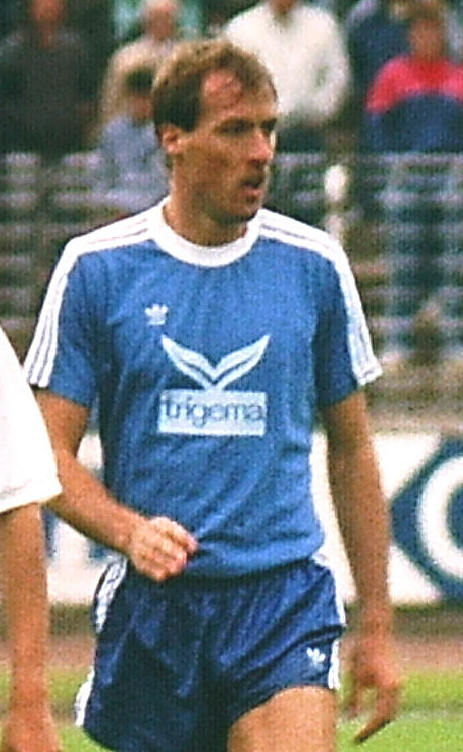
- Kleppinger with Schalke 04 in 1986

Personal information
- Date of birth: 1 March 1958 (age 68)
- Place of birth: Ober-Ramstadt, West Germany
- Height: 1.86 m (6 ft 1 in)
- Position: Defender

Youth career
- –1975: SKG Ober-Ramstadt

Senior career*
Years	Team	Apps	(Gls)
1975	SKG Ober-Ramstadt		
1975–1980	Darmstadt 98	94	(5)
1980–1982	Hannover 96	79	(16)
1982–1984	Karlsruher SC	69	(7)
1984–1987	Schalke 04	97	(12)
1987–1988	Borussia Dortmund	33	(1)
1988–1991	Bayer Uerdingen	92	(5)
1991–1996	Darmstadt 98	77	(4)

International career
1986	West Germany U-21	1	(0)
1988	West Germany Olympic	8	(1)

Managerial career
- 1994–1996: Darmstadt 98
- 1996–1997: SC Viktoria 06 Griesheim
- 1997–1999: FC St. Pauli
- 1999–2000: FC Gütersloh
- 2000–2001: Rot-Weiß Oberhausen
- 2002–2005: Schalke 04 II
- 2005: FSV Frankfurt
- 2006–2009: Darmstadt 98
- 2021: SV Sandhausen
- 2023: SV Sandhausen (interim)
- 2024: SV Sandhausen (interim)
- 2025: SV Sandhausen (interim)
Medal record
Representing West Germany
Men's football
Olympic Games
Bronze medal – third place	1988 Seoul	Team
- * Club domestic league appearances and goals

Gerhard Kleppinger (born 1 March 1958) is a German football manager of SV Sandhausen and former player.
