= Sabrina Wittmann =

German football coach (born 1991)

Personal information
- Date of birth: 19 July 1991 (age 35)
- Place of birth: Ingolstadt, Germany
- Position: Midfielder

Youth career
- 2005–2008: SC Steinberg

Senior career*
Years	Team	Apps	(Gls)
2009–2013	Ingolstadt		
2013–2014	Greuther Fürth		
2014–2015	Stern München		
2015–2023	Amicitia München		

Managerial career
- 2024–2026: FC Ingolstadt
- * Club domestic league appearances and goals

Sabrina Wittmann (German pronunciation: [zaˈbʁiːna ˈvɪtman]; born 19 July 1991) is a German professional football manager who last managed FC Ingolstadt. She is the first female head coach in Germany's top three divisions of football.

== Playing career ==
Born in Ingolstadt, Wittmann began playing football with SC Steinberg/Biberg in Kipfenberg in 2005, then joined FC Ingolstadt's B youth team. At age 16, she moved to the U.S. state of Kentucky, where she played high school soccer.

== Managerial career ==
Wittmann first coached football as an assistant for a middle school team in Kentucky in 2008. She returned to Germany and joined FC Ingolstadt's academy as a coach in 2009. She became head coach of the under-15 women's team in 2012. She co-managed the club's Under 19 Bundesliga team starting in 2018–19.

On 2 May 2024, Wittmann was promoted to replace Michael Köllner as interim head coach of the senior team, making her the first woman to coach a team in the top three divisions of German football. The team went undefeated under Wittmann with two wins and two draws to close the 2023–24 season, finishing with a win in the regional Bavarian Cup on 25 May to qualify for the DFB-Pokal. On 6 June, the club announced that she was made the team's permanent head coach. She was dismissed by FC Ingolstadt on 24 September 2026.

== Coaching record ==
As of match played on 19 September 2026

Team	From	To	Record					Ref.
Team	From	To	G	W	D	L	Win %	Ref.
FC Ingolstadt	3 May 2024	24 September 2026	97	40	24	33	41.24	
