= Michél Kniat =

German football manager (born 1985)

Personal information
- Date of birth: 18 November 1985 (age 40)
- Place of birth: Eschweiler, West Germany
- Height: 1.91 m (6 ft 3 in)
- Position: Centre-back

Team information
- Current team: Holstein Kiel (manager)

Youth career
- –1998: Alemannia Mariadorf
- 1998–2004: Alemannia Aachen

Senior career*
Years	Team	Apps	(Gls)
2004–2005	KFC Uerdingen	28	(0)
2005–2006	Kickers Emden	12	(0)
2006–2007	SV Straelen	32	(2)
2007–2009	Borussia Mönchengladbach II	16	(0)
2009–2010	Goslarer SC	17	(3)
2010–2012	SC Wiedenbrück	39	(3)
2012–2013	FC Oberneuland	17	(1)
2013–2017	Blumenthaler SV	72	(21)

Managerial career
- 2014–2017: Blumenthaler SV (player-manager)
- 2017–2022: SC Paderborn II
- 2022–2023: SC Verl
- 2023–2026: Arminia Bielefeld
- 2026–: Holstein Kiel
- * Club domestic league appearances and goals

Michél Kniat (born 18 November 1985) is a German football manager who currently manages Holstein Kiel.

== Career ==
Kniat started his managerial career at Blumenthaler SV in 2014, where he became player-manager and remained at the club for four seasons. He then managed the reserves of SC Paderborn for five years before joining 3. Liga team SC Verl in February 2022. On 13 June 2023, Kniat left Verl in order to become new manager of the newly relegated Arminia Bielefeld. After the 2025–26 season, he left Bielefeld.

On 10 November 2026, Kniat was announced as new head coach of 2. Bundesliga club Holstein Kiel.
