= Olaf Janßen =

German footballer and manager

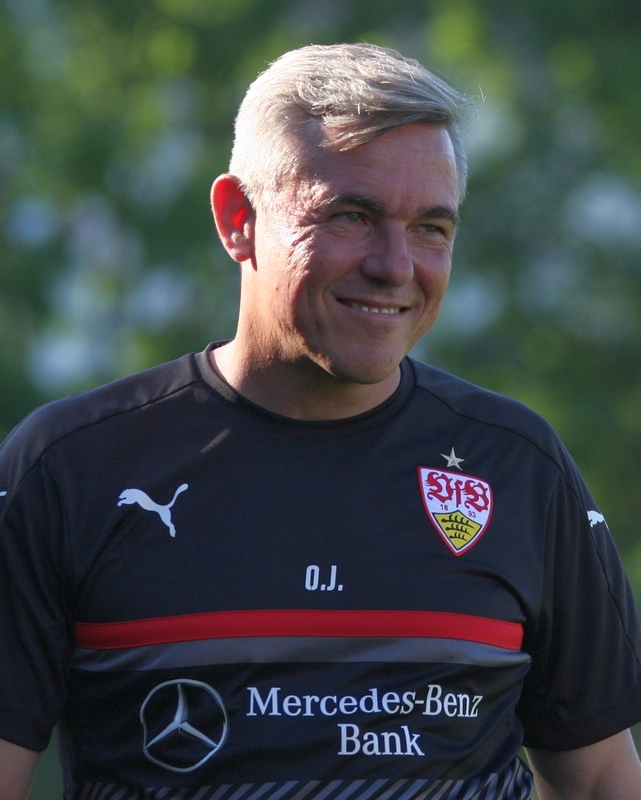
- Janßen managing VfB Stuttgart in 2016

Personal information
- Date of birth: 8 October 1966 (age 60)
- Place of birth: Krefeld, West Germany
- Height: 1.77 m (5 ft 10 in)
- Position: Midfielder

Team information
- Current team: Grasshopper (head coach)

Youth career
- Hülser FC
- Bayer Uerdingen

Senior career*
Years	Team	Apps	(Gls)
1985–1996	1. FC Köln	209	(16)
1996–2000	Eintracht Frankfurt	50	(3)
2000	→ Bellinzona (loan)	7	(0)
Total		266	(19)

International career
- West Germany U16
	West Germany U21	1	(0)
	West Germany Olympic	3	(0)

Managerial career
- 2003–2004: 1860 Munich (assistant)
- 2006: Rot-Weiss Essen (caretaker)
- 2013–2014: Dynamo Dresden
- 2016: VfB Stuttgart (caretaker)
- 2017: FC St. Pauli
- 2018: Viktoria Köln
- 2021–2025: Viktoria Köln
- 2025–2026: Sandhausen
- 2026–: Grasshopper
Medal record
Olympic Games
Bronze medal – third place	1988 Seoul	Team
- * Club domestic league appearances and goals

Olaf Janßen (born 8 October 1966) is a retired German footballer and coach, who played as a midfielder who is currently head coach of Swiss Super League club Grasshopper.

== Club career ==
Janßen spent most of his playing career with German Bundesliga sides 1. FC Köln and Eintracht Frankfurt, where he later worked as a scout.

In September 2013 he was appointed as manager of Dynamo Dresden, but was sacked after nine months on the job.

In June 2016 Janßen became assistant coach to VfB Stuttgart head coach Jos Luhukay. From 15 to 20 September 2016 he was caretaker manager of the club. Janßen took on a new role as scout of VfB Stuttgart and left the coaching staff after the appointment of the new head coach Hannes Wolf.

For the 2017–18 season, he was appointed as the head coach of FC St. Pauli. He was sacked on 7 December 2017.

In January 2018 he became new manager of FC Viktoria Köln replacing Marco Antwerpen. He returned to Cologne on 1 February 2021. After four years, he was signed by SV Sandhausen.

== International career ==
Janßen played for West Germany at the 1988 Summer Olympics in Seoul.

== Career statistics ==
As of 28 March 2026

Team	From	To	Record					
Team	From	To	G	W	D	L	Win %	Ref.
Rot-Weiss Essen	9 November 2006	17 November 2006	1	0	0	1	0.00	
Dynamo Dresden	4 September 2013	13 May 2014	28	5	14	9	17.86	
VfB Stuttgart	15 September 2016	20 September 2016	2	2	0	0	100.00	
FC St. Pauli	1 July 2017	7 December 2017	16	5	5	6	31.25	
Viktoria Köln	2 January 2018	17 June 2018	18	12	6	0	66.67	
Viktoria Köln	1 February 2021	30 June 2025	192	85	43	64	44.27	
Sandhausen	1 July 2025	Present	31	14	6	11	45.16	
Total			288	123	74	91	42.71	—
