= Thomas Stamm =

Swiss footballer (born 1983)

Personal information
- Date of birth: 19 February 1983 (age 43)
- Place of birth: Zürich, Switzerland
- Height: 1.79 m (5 ft 10 in)
- Positions: Right midfielder; right-back

Team information
- Current team: Dynamo Dresden (head coach)

Senior career*
| Years | Team | Apps | (Gls) |
| 1998–1999 | FC Schaffhausen | | |
| 1999–2001 | FC Winterthur | | |
| 2001–2002 | Grasshoppers II | | |
| 2002–2007 | FC Winterthur | | |
| 2007–2010 | FC Schaffhausen | | |
| 2013–2014 | SV Schaffhausen | | |

Managerial career
- 2021–2024: SC Freiburg II
- 2024–: Dynamo Dresden
- * Club domestic league appearances and goals

Thomas Stamm (born 19 February 1983) is a Swiss football manager and former player who is the head coach of 2. Bundesliga club Dynamo Dresden.

== Managerial career ==
In 2015, Stamm was appointed as a youth manager of German side SC Freiburg, helping the club's under-19 team win the 2017–18 DFB-Junioren-Vereinspokal. In 2021, Stamm was appointed manager of their reserve team, helping the club achieve second place in the league. For the 2024–25 season, he was named the manager of Dynamo Dresden.

== Management style ==
Stamm has been regarded to prefer the 3–4–3 formation. German news website Kicke wrote in 2023 that he "favors an attacking approach, is very flexible in his approach, and often changes his tactics during the 90 minutes".

== Personal life ==
Stamm was born on 19 February 1983. Born in Zürich, Switzerland, he is the son of a German mother and a Swiss father. As a hobby, he enjoys reading.

== Coaching record ==
As of match played on 22 November 2026

| Team | From | To | Record | | | | | Ref. |
| Team | From | To | G | W | D | L | Win % | Ref. |
|---|---|---|---|---|---|---|---|---|
| SC Freiburg II | 1 July 2021 | 19 May 2024 | 111 | 40 | 27 | 44 | 36.04 | |
| Dynamo Dresden | 19 May 2024 | present | 89 | 37 | 21 | 31 | 41.57 | |
| Total | | | 200 | 77 | 48 | 75 | 38.50 | — |
