= Alexander Ende =

German football player and manager

Personal information
- Date of birth: 19 September 1979 (age 47)
- Place of birth: Grevenbroich, Germany
- Height: 1.83 m (6 ft 0 in)
- Position: Midfielder

Senior career*
Years	Team	Apps	(Gls)
2000–2001	Viktoria Köln		
2001–2004	1. FC Köln II		
2004–2005	Bonner SC		
2005–2006	SC Pfullendorf	32	(1)
2006–2007	Preußen Münster	16	(1)
2007–2008	SC Verl	15	(2)
2008–2009	Bayer Leverkusen II	17	(1)
2009–2013	Fortuna Köln		

Managerial career
- 2020–2022: Fortuna Köln
- 2023–2025: SC Verl
- 2025–2026: Preußen Münster
- 2026: Fortuna Düsseldorf
- * Club domestic league appearances and goals

Alexander Ende (born 19 September 1979) is a German football manager and former player who played as a midfielder.

== Playing career ==
As a player, Ende played as a midfielder for Viktoria Köln (2000–2001), 1. FC Köln II (2001–2004), Bonner SC (2004–2005), SC Pfullendorf (2005–2006), Preußen Münster (2006–2007), SC Verl (2007–2008), Bayer Leverkusen II (2008–2009) and Fortuna Köln (2009–2013).

== Managerial career ==
Ende became a coach at FC Ingolstadt in 2013, and then at Borussia Mönchengladbach from 2015. He was assistant manager of the under-17 side from July to September 2015, and manager of the under-17 side from then. He became assistant manager of Borussia Mönchengladbach II from summer 2016.

He left his role at Borussia Mönchengladbach in summer 2020 and became head coach of Regionalliga West club Fortuna Köln. In March 2022, it was announced that Ende and Fortuna Köln had not agreed on a new deal and he would leave the club at the end of the season. He managed the club to a 4th and a 5th placed finish in his two seasons as manager.

In December 2022, he returned to Borussia Mönchengladbach as manager of their under-19 team. He left this role in summer 2023 and became manager of 3. Liga club SC Verl. In April 2025, Ende confirmed he would not renew his contract as Verl manager and would leave the club at the end of the season. He managed the club to 12th and 7th placed finishes in his two seasons as manager.

Ende was appointed as manager of Preußen Münster of the 2. Bundesliga in summer 2025, but was sacked in March 2026 after a 6–0 defeat to Dynamo Dresden, with the club 16th in the table after amassing 26 points from 26 matches. On 12 April 2026, he was appointed as manager of relegation-threatened 2. Bundesliga club Fortuna Düsseldorf. After 6 points from 5 games, Düsseldorf were relegated in 17th place with 37 points, above only his former club Preußen Münster, becoming the first 2. Bundesliga coach in 27 years to be relegated with two clubs in a single season. He was sacked in October 2026.
