= Argirios Giannikis =

Germanfootball manager (born 1980)

Argyris Giannikis
Personal information
- Full name: Argirios Giannikis
- Date of birth: 9 July 1980 (age 46)
- Place of birth: Nuremberg, West Germany

Team information
- Current team: 1. FC Saarbrücken (manager)

Managerial career
- Years: Team
- 2017–2018: Rot-Weiss Essen
- 2018–2019: VfR Aalen
- 2019–2021: PAS Giannina
- 2021–2022: AEK Athens
- 2024–2025: 1860 Munich
- 2026–: 1. FC Saarbrücken

Argirios Giannikis (born 9 July 1980) is a Greek-German professional football manager of 1. FC Saarbrücken. He has also previously managed Greek clubs PAS Giannina and AEK Athens, and German clubs Rot-Weiss Essen and VfR Aalen.

== Early life ==
Giannikis was born in Nuremberg and grew up in Germany.

== Managerial career ==
Giannikis worked as a coach for Karlsruher SC from 2007 and as assistant manager at the club to Markus Kauczinski from 2012, until leaving the club in 2016 to follow Kauczinski to FC Ingolstadt 04, where he was once again Kauczinski's assistant manager.

On 14 October 2017, Giannikis was appointed as manager of Rot-Weiss Essen on a contract until the end of the season. He led Essen to pick up 13 points from the six games between his appointment and the winter break. On 20 January 2018, Giannikis announced that he would not renew his contract at Essen beyond the end of the season, before it was later announced that he was to become VfR Aalen manager for the following season. Having suffered hostility from Essen supporters for this decision, he left the club on 7 April 2018 and was immediately succeeded by Karsten Neitzel. Giannikis was sacked from his role at VfL Aalen on 10 February 2019 after three wins in 22 3. Liga games.

In 2019, Giannikis was appointed as the coach of PAS Giannina. In his first season with the club, he managed to win the 2019–20 Super League Greece 2 title and so the club was promoted to Super League 1, the top division of Greek football. In 2020–21, he led the team to an 9th-place finish. He also managed to get the team into the semi-finals of the 2020–21 Greek Football Cup for the third time in the club's history after beating Atromitos and Panathinaikos. In the semifinals, the club lost to Olympiacos 2–4 on aggregate. He left the club at the end of the 2020–21 season.

Giannikis was appointed as AEK Athens manager on 10 October 2021, and in December 2021 his contract with the club was extended until 2024. However, he was sacked on 1 March 2022.

After leaving AEK, Giannikis returned to Germany and took a break from management, instead spending time with his family. He was appointed as 1860 Munich manager in January 2024. On 20 January 2025, he was dismissed by 1860 Munich.

He became the new head coach of 1. FC Saarbrücken on 11 February 2026.

== Personal life ==
In June 2014, Giannikis was married to his wife Rula near Thessaloniki.

== Managerial statistics ==
As of match played 8 March 2024

Managerial record by team and tenure
Team	From	To	Record				
Team	From	To	G	W	D	L	Win %
RW Essen	14 October 2017	7 April 2018	16	9	3	4	56.25
VfR Aalen	1 July 2018	10 February 2019	25	5	8	12	20.00
PAS Giannina	1 July 2019	30 June 2021	53	24	12	17	45.28
AEK Athens	10 October 2021	1 March 2022	23	11	4	8	47.83
1860 Munich	10 January 2024	20 January 2025	29	11	5	13	37.93
Total			146	60	32	54	41.10

== Honours ==
=== PAS Giannina ===
- Super League 2: 2019–20
