= Marcel Seegert =

German footballer (born 1994)

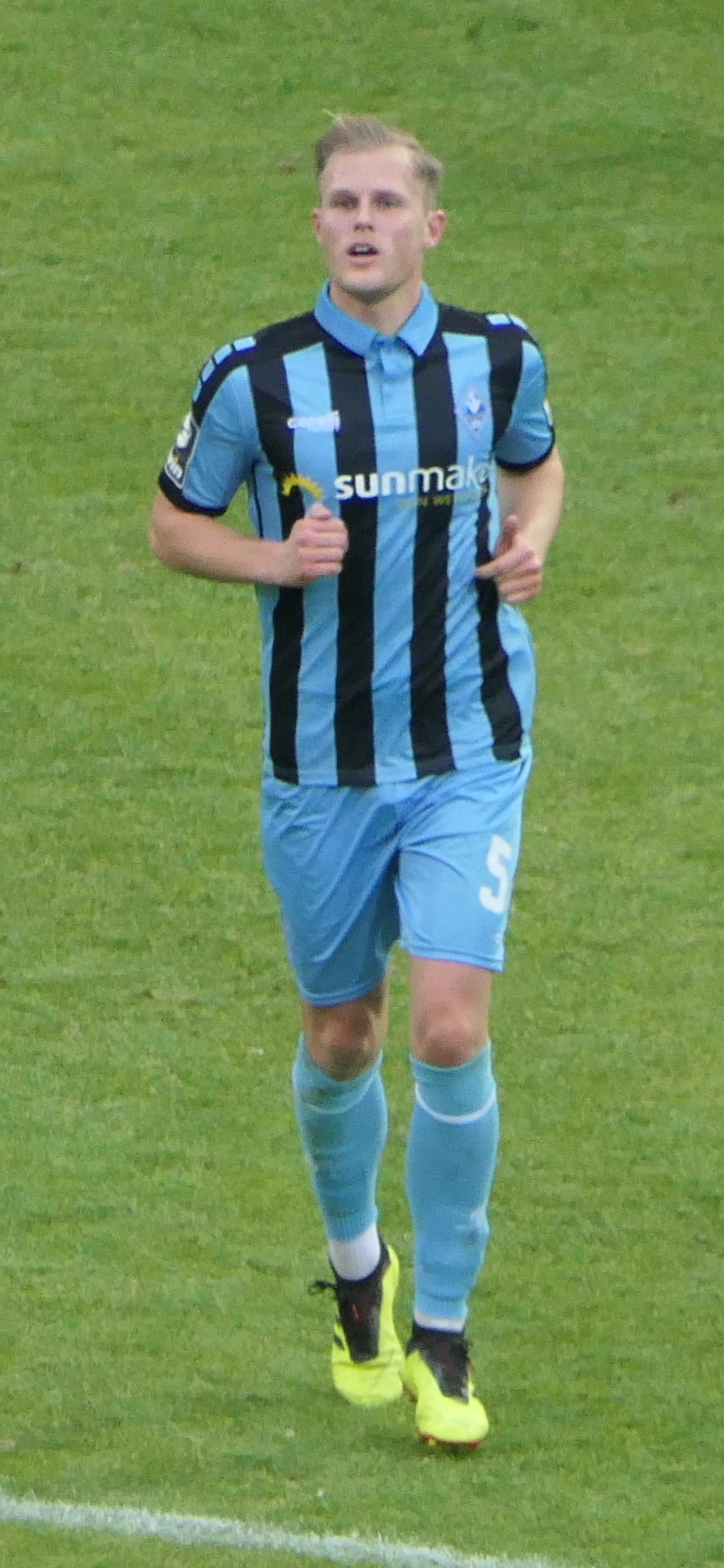
- Seegert in 2019

Personal information
- Date of birth: 29 April 1994 (age 32)
- Place of birth: Mannheim, Germany
- Height: 1.86 m (6 ft 1 in)
- Position: Centre-back

Team information
- Current team: SSV Ulm
- Number: 25

Youth career
- PSV Mannheim
- SC Käfertal
- Waldhof Mannheim
- –2011: 1899 Hoffenheim
- 2011–2013: Mainz 05

Senior career*
Years	Team	Apps	(Gls)
2013–2014	Mainz 05 II	12	(0)
2014–2017	Waldhof Mannheim	99	(14)
2017–2019	SV Sandhausen	11	(0)
2019–2025	Waldhof Mannheim	191	(11)
2025–	SSV Ulm	37	(3)

International career
2010	Germany U17	1	(0)
- * Club domestic league appearances and goals as of 24 September 2026

Marcel Seegert (born 29 April 1994) is a German professional footballer who plays as a centre-back for club SSV Ulm.
