= Sreto Ristić =

German-Croatian footballer

Personal information
- Date of birth: 7 February 1976 (age 50)
- Place of birth: Zagreb, SR Croatia, SFR Yugoslavia
- Height: 1.88 m (6 ft 2 in)
- Position: Forward

Youth career
- Dinamo Zagreb
- –1995: SSV Reutlingen

Senior career*
Years	Team	Apps	(Gls)
1995–1996	SSV Reutlingen	51	(12)
1996–2000	VfB Stuttgart	47	(5)
2000–2001	Campomaiorense	9	(0)
2001	SSV Ulm	13	(4)
2001–2004	Union Berlin	82	(22)
2005	Guangzhou Rizhiquan	8	(0)
2005–2006	VfB Stuttgart II	16	(1)
2006–2007	Grasshoppers	27	(8)
2007–2008	Eintracht Braunschweig	17	(1)
2008–2011	SV Sandhausen	73	(12)
Total		343	(65)

Managerial career
- 2018: Chemnitzer FC (caretaker)
- 2019: Chemnitzer FC (caretaker)
- 2021–2022: Kickers Offenbach
- 2023–2024: Hallescher FC
- 2024: SV Sandhausen
- * Club domestic league appearances and goals

Sreto Ristić (born 7 February 1976) is a German retired footballer, who last managed SV Sandhausen. He holds Croatian citizenship. He moved to Germany at young age and has spent almost all his football career in Germany.

== Coaching career ==
In October 2013, Ristić was hired as assistant coach for Stuttgarter Kickers. He left the position on 4 November 2015. On 20 May 2016, Ristić joined Preußen Münster as assistant manager.

Ahead of the 2017–18 season, Ristić was hired as assistant manager at Chemnitzer FC. In January 2018, he was appointed caretaker manager. It lasted for four days before a new manager was appointed. On 4 September 2019, he was appointed caretaker manager once again, before Patrick Glöckner replaced him 18 days later.

In December 2020 it was announced that he would be the manager of Kickers Offenbach from 1 January 2021. After leaving Offenbach in summer of 2022, he was appointed as the new coach of Hallescher FC in February 2023. He was sacked on 1 April 2024. For the 2024–25 season, he was appointed by SV Sandhausen. He was sacked in December 2024.
