= Marco Antwerpen =

German football manager

Personal information
- Date of birth: 5 October 1971 (age 55)
- Place of birth: Unna, West Germany
- Height: 1.90 m (6 ft 3 in)
- Position: Forward

Senior career*
Years	Team	Apps	(Gls)
1989–1991	SV Holzwickede		
1991–1993	Rot-Weiß Lüdenscheid		
1993–1996	Hammer SpVg		
1996–1999	Preußen Münster		
1999–2000	Rot-Weiss Essen		
2000–2001	Fortuna Köln	34	(12)
2001–2004	Preußen Münster	75	(26)
2004–2005	Schalke 04 II		
2005–2006	FC Gütersloh 2000		
2007–2008	Preußen Münster	16	(5)

Managerial career
- 2012–2013: Rot Weiss Ahlen
- 2014–2016: Rot Weiss Ahlen
- 2016–2017: Viktoria Köln
- 2017–2019: Preußen Münster
- 2019–2020: Eintracht Braunschweig
- 2020: Würzburger Kickers
- 2021–2022: 1. FC Kaiserslautern
- 2024: Waldhof Mannheim
- 2024–2025: VfL Osnabrück
- * Club domestic league appearances and goals

Marco Antwerpen (born 5 October 1971) is a German football manager who was most recently the head coach of VfL Osnabrück and former player.

== Coaching career ==
Antwerpen began his coaching career with lower league clubs VfB Günnigfeld and SV Burgsteinfurt. In the 2011–12 season he took over the U19 team of Rot Weiss Ahlen. A year later, he became manager of the first team. After one season, he took a sabbatical, before returning towards the end of the 2013–14 season.

In January 2019 it was announced that Antwerpen and his staff would be leaving 3. Liga club Preußen Münster at the end of the 2018–19 season.

Antwerpen was appointed manager of 3. Liga side Würzburger Kickers in September 2020. On 9 November 2020, after four losses in the league, he was sacked. In January 2024, he took over Waldhof Mannheim.

Antwerpen became 1. FC Kaiserslautern manager on 1 February 2021. He was sacked on 10 May 2022.

He moved to Waldhof Mannheim in January 2024 but was sacked in September of the same year. In December 2024, he was signed by VfL Osnabrück. He was sacked in May 2025.

== Managerial statistics ==
As of match played 12 March 2022

Managerial record by team and tenure
Team	From	To	Record								Ref
Team	From	To	G	W	D	L	GF	GA	GD	Win %	Ref
Rot Weiss Ahlen	1 July 2012	30 June 2013	34	12	10	12	51	62	−11	35.29	
Rot Weiss Ahlen	14 April 2014	18 May 2016	82	39	14	29	148	127	+21	47.56	
Viktoria Köln	1 July 2016	11 December 2017	62	41	7	14	158	74	+84	66.13	
Preußen Münster	12 December 2017	30 June 2019	60	27	11	22	92	73	+19	45.00	
Eintracht Braunschweig	18 November 2019	7 July 2020	23	11	6	6	40	34	+6	47.83	
Würzburger Kickers	29 September 2020	9 November 2020	5	0	1	4	6	14	−8	0.00	
1. FC Kaiserslautern	1 February 2021	10 May 2022	48	21	15	12	74	45	+29	43.75	
Total			314	151	64	99	569	429	+140	48.09	—
