= Lothar Baier =

Lothar Baier (16 May 1942 – 11 July 2004) was a German author, publisher, translator and co-founder of the Literary periodical Text+Kritik.

Baier was born in Karlsruhe. He was accepted as one of the most profound German thinkers of the Francophone World and was recognized with the 1982 Jean Améry Prize for Essayists and with the 2003 Gerrit Engelke Prize. Baier published amongst others in the Merkur, in the Kursbuch and in the Deutschlandfunk and was for many years the editor of the Die Wochenzeitung (WOZ) in Zürich.

On 11 July 2004, Baier committed suicide in Montreal, Quebec, Canada.

== Works ==
- Über Ror Wolf. Editor, Frankfurt am Main: Suhrkamp 1972
- Französische Zustände. Berichte und Essays (French State. Reports and Essays). Frankfurt am Main: Europäische Verlagsanstalt 1982.
- Jahresfrist. Erzählung. Frankfurt am Main: Fischer Verlag 1985.
- Firma Frankreich. Eine Betriebsbesichtigung (Company France. A Business Report). Berlin: Wagenbach 1988.
- Gleichheitszeichen. Streitschriften über Abweichung und Identität (Identical Signs. Argumentative Writing about Allowance and Identity). Berlin: Wagenbach 1985.
- Un allemand né de la dernière guerre. essai. Paris: Calmann-Lévy 1989.
- Volk ohne Zeit. Essay über das eilige Vaterland (People without Time. Essay about a Hurried Fatherland). Berlin: Wagenbach 1990.
- Zeichen und Wunder. Kritiken und Essays (Signs and Wonder. Critiques and Essays). Berlin: Ed. Tiamat 1990.
- Die große Ketzerei. Verfolgung und Ausrottung der Katharer durch Kirche und Wissenschaft (The Great Heresy. Persecution and Extermination through Church and Science). Berlin: Wagenbach 1991.
- "Farewell to Regionalism". Telos 90 (Winter 1991–2). New York: Telos Press
- Christoph Hein. Texte, Daten, Bilder (Christoph Hein. Texts, Dates, Pictures). Editor, Frankfurt am Main: Luchterhand 1990.
- Die verleugnete Utopie. Zeitkritische Texte (The Denied Utopia. Time Critical Texts). Berlin: Aufbau 1993.
- Ostwestpassagen. Kulturwandel – Sprachzeiten (East West Passages. Cultural Change – Language Times). München: Antje Kunstmann 1995.
- Keine Zeit. 18 Versuche über die Beschleunigung (No Time. 18 Attempts at Acceleration). München: Antje Kunstmann 2000.
- Anders schreibendes Amerika. Eine Anthologie der Literatur aus Quebec 1945 – 2000 (Other Literary America. An anthology of the Literature from Quebec 1945–2000). Editors Lothar Baier and Pierre Filion. Heidelberg: Verlag Wunderhorn 2000.
- Was wird Literatur? (What becomes Literature?) München: Antje Kunstmann 2001
