= Rainer-Malkowski-Preis =

German literary award

Rainer-Malkowski-Preis is a literary prize of Germany. The prize is awarded every two years by the Bavarian Academy of Fine Arts in cooperation with the Rainer Malkowski Foundation. The Rainer Malkowski Prize, with prize money of 30,000 euros, is one of the most highly endowed German literary prizes. The prize has been founded in 2005 by the Stiftung zur Förderung deutschsprachiger Literatur (Foundation for the Promotion of German-Language Literature), on request of the poet Rainer Malkowski, who died in 2003.

== Recipients ==
- 2006: Manfred Peter Hein
- 2008: Adolf Endler und Kurt Drawert (equal parts)
- 2010: Angela Krauß
- 2012: Christoph Meckel und Lutz Seiler (equal parts)
- 2014: Daniela Danz und Mirko Bonné (equal parts)
- 2016: Klaus Merz (main prize); Efrat Gal-Ed (scholarship)
- 2018: Ror Wolf (main prize); Sylvia Geist (scholarship)
- 2020: Anja Kampmann und Norbert Hummelt (equal parts)
- 2022: Norbert Scheuer
- 2024: Wilhelm Bartsch
