= Jens Sparschuh =

German writer (born 1955)

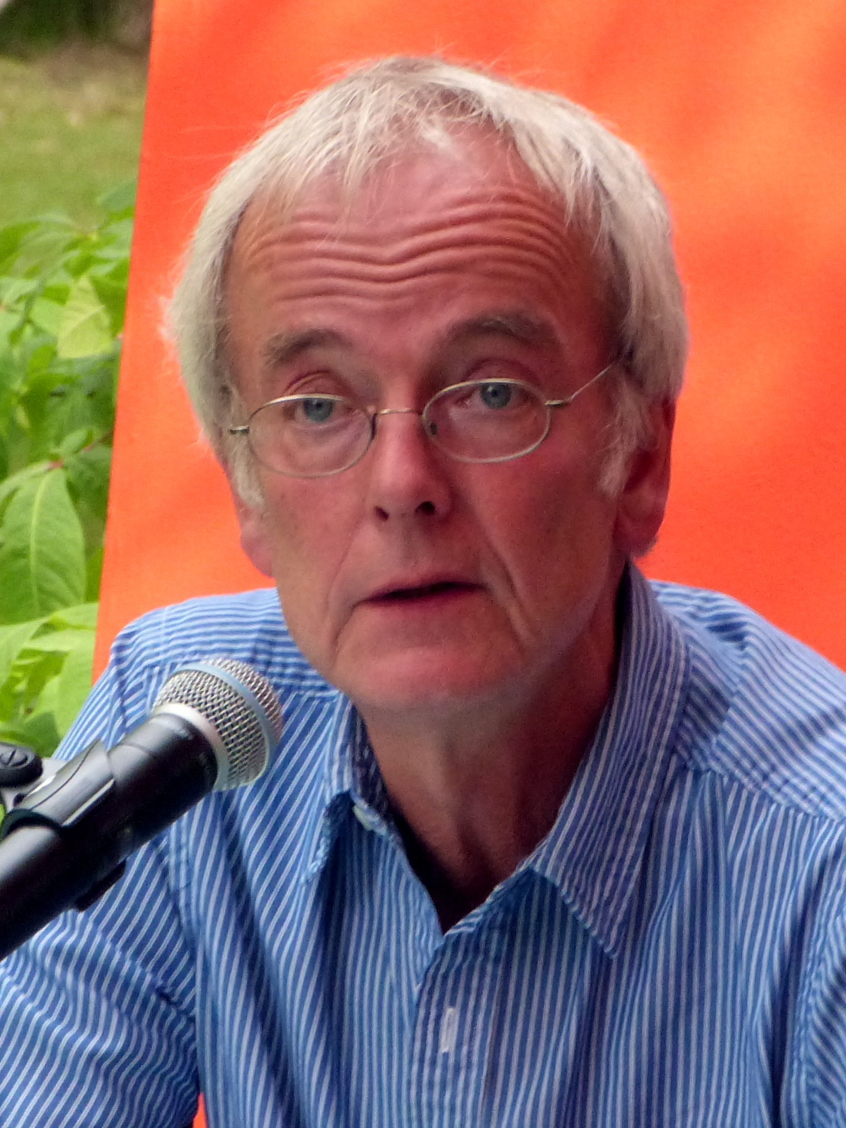
The writer Jens Sparschuh at a reading at the Erlanger Poetenfest 2017

Jens Sparschuh (born 14 May 1955) is a German writer from Chemnitz.

== Life ==
Sparschuh was born in Chemnitz (then Karl-Marx-Stadt) and grew up in East Berlin. After graduation in Halle (Saale) he studied philosophy and logic in Leningrad from 1973 until 1978. From 1978, he was assistant-scientist at the Humboldt University of Berlin and in 1983 he got his Ph.D. for the thesis „heuristischen Ausdrucksfähigkeit aussagenlogischer Beweisbegriffe“.

From then on, Sparschuh makes his living as a writer of novels, essays, poetry and audio books.

After the German reunification he briefly was member of the New Forum.

In 2006 and 2019 he gave short courses in Grinnell-College on German literature. He also gave lessons in the Deutsches Literaturinstitut Leipzig.

== Awards ==
- 1988 Anna-Seghers-Preis
- 1990 Hörspielpreis der Kriegsblinden
- 1996 Förderpreis of the Literaturpreis der Stadt Bremen
- 2018 Prix Chronos
- 2019 Günter-Grass-Preis

== Works ==
=== Non fiction ===
- Erkenntnistheoretisch-methodologische Untersuchungen zur heuristischen Ausdrucksfähigkeit aussagenlogischer Beweisbegriffe, Berlin 1983

=== Prose ===
- Waldwärts, Berlin 1985
- Der große Coup, Berlin 1987
- Kopfsprung, Berlin 1989
- Indwendig, Winsen/Luhe 1990
- Der Schneemensch, Köln 1993
- Parzival Pechvogel, Zürich (etc.) 1994
- Das Vertreterseminar, Köln 1995
- Der Zimmerspringbrunnen, Köln 1995

French: Fontaine d'appartement, 1999
Italian: Il venditore di fontane, 2000

- Spuren in der Weltwüste, Lichtenfels 1996
- Ich dachte, sie finden uns nicht, Köln 1997
- Die schöne Belinda und ihr Erfinder, Zürich 1997
- Lavaters Maske, Köln 1999
- Die Elbe, Leipzig 2000 (together with Jörn Vanhöfen and Walter Kempowski)
- Stinkstiefel, Zürich 2000
- Eins zu eins, Köln 2003
- Silberblick, Köln 2004
- Vom Tisch, Leipzig 2004

=== As editor ===
- Friedrich von Schiller: Der Geisterseher, Berlin 1984
- Friedrich Hebbel: Läuse der Vernunft, Berlin 1987

=== Radio play pieces ===
- Ein Nebulo bist du together with Manfred Steffen. Director: Norbert Schaeffer. Prod.: SR/SWF/SDR, 1989. ISBN 3-89813-068-1 (Hörspielpreis der Kriegsblinden)
