= Hermann Korte =

German academic (1949–2020)

- Born: 11 January 1949; Meppen, Germany
- Died: 21 January 2020 (aged 71); Lippstadt, Germany
- Occupations: University professor, Germanist (literature)

Hermann Korte (11 January 1949 - 21 January 2020) was a German academic specialising in German literature, language and linguistics.

== Early years ==
Korte was born in Meppen, where he successfully concluded his schooling and his Community Service in 1968 before moving on to Münster University, where between 1969 and 1972 he studied History, Sociology and German Studies. He continued his academic studies at Bochum. He passed the first stage of a teaching qualification in 1975, and held various teaching traineeship positions finally obtaining the second stage teaching qualification in 1978. His doctorate, entitled "War in the poetry of expressionism" ("Der Krieg in der Lyrik des Expressionismus"), for which he was supervised by Paul Gerhard Klussmann, followed in 1979.

== Professional years ==
Korte was the specialist in charge of German study-seminars at Gelsenkirchen between 1979 and 1990, after which he took up a teaching position at the Schalke Grammar School at Gelsenkirchen. From 1981 till 1992 he was also a lecturer at University of Münster University's German Studies institute.

Between 1990 and 2001 he was chief Director of Studies at the Leibnitz Grammar School in Gelsenkirchen, and at the same time a member of the school's German Curriculum commission. He had a teaching contract with the University of Duisburg-Essen from 1993 till 2001 and also engaged in private tuition after gaining his "Habilitation" qualification in 1996. Since 2002 Korte has been the professor of Literature didactics at Siegen.

Korte was also an editor of the literary journal Text+Kritik. Other focuses of his work included nineteenth and twentieth century literature, literary expressionism, the history of poetry, post-war German literature and the works of Kurt Tucholsky. He died in Lippstadt.
