= Meppen =

Meppen Möppen (Northern Low Saxon)
- Town
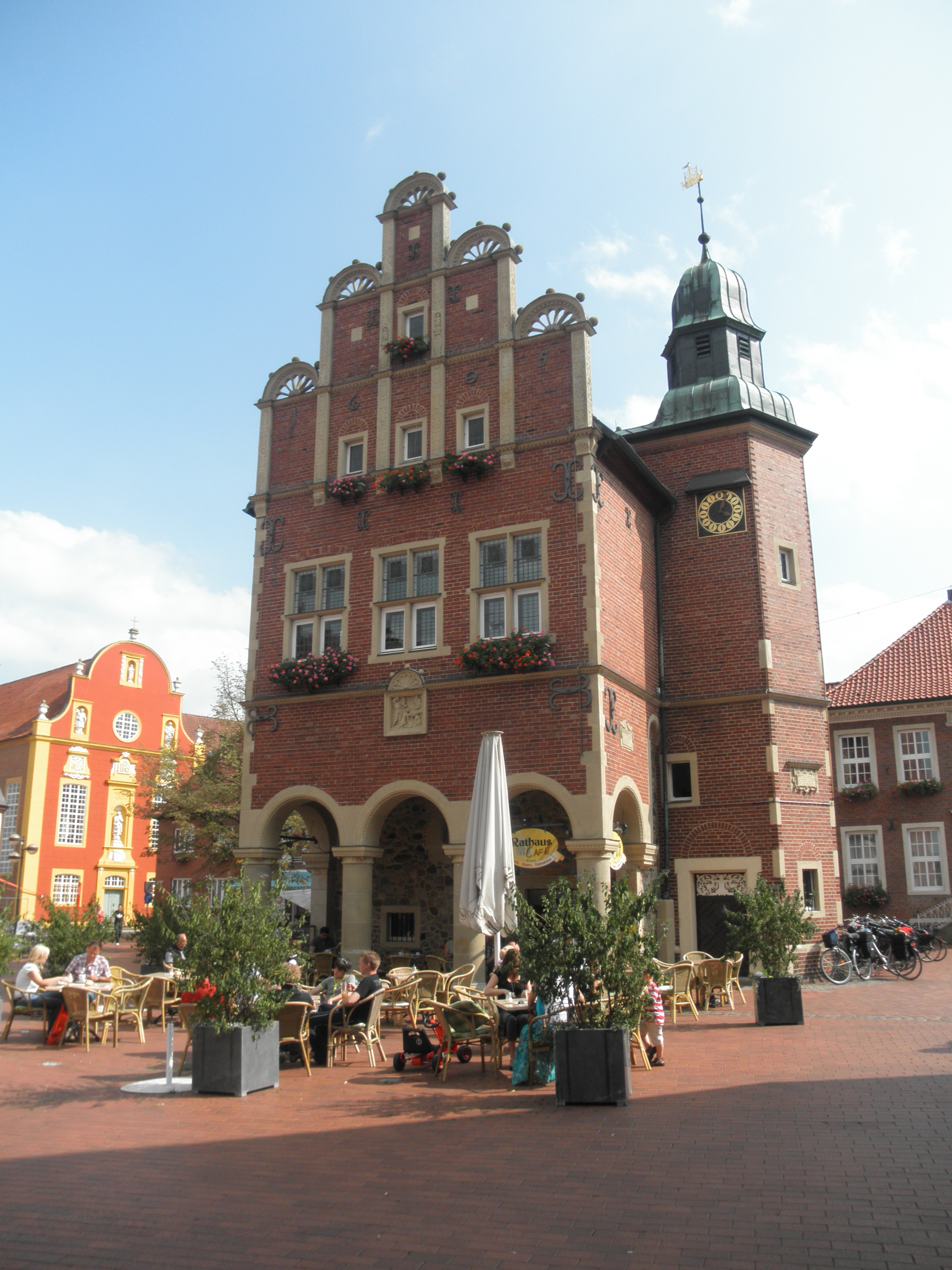
- Town hall

- Coat of arms

- Location of Meppen within Emsland district
- Interactive map of Meppen
- Location within Germany Location within Lower Saxony
- Coordinates: 52°41′37″N 7°17′34″E
- Country: Germany
- State: Lower Saxony
- District: Emsland
- Subdivisions: 7 Stadtteile and 13 villages

Government
  - Mayor (2021–26): Helmut Knurbein (Ind.)

Area
  - Total: 188.4 km^{2} (72.7 sq mi)
- Elevation: 14 m (46 ft)

Population (2025-12-31)
  - Total: 36,984
  - Density: 196.3/km^{2} (508.4/sq mi)
- Time zone: UTC+01:00 (CET)
  - Summer (DST): UTC+02:00 (CEST)
- Postal codes: 49716
- Dialling codes: 05931
- Vehicle registration: EL
- Website: www.meppen.de

Meppen (German pronunciation: [ˈmɛpm̩]; Northern Low Saxon: Möppen) is a town in and the seat of the Emsland district of Lower Saxony, Germany, at the confluence of the Ems, Hase, and Nordradde rivers and the Dortmund–Ems Canal (DEK). The name stems from the word Mappe, meaning "delta".

As of 2025, the population of Meppen is 36,984.

== Geography ==
The town is in the central part of the Emsland, at the mouth of the Hase River where it meets the Ems, between the cities of Lingen and Papenburg. About 20 kilometres (12 mi) from the Dutch border, Meppen has an area of 188.45 square kilometres (72.76 sq mi) and is 15 metres (49 ft) above sea level.

=== Districts of Meppen ===
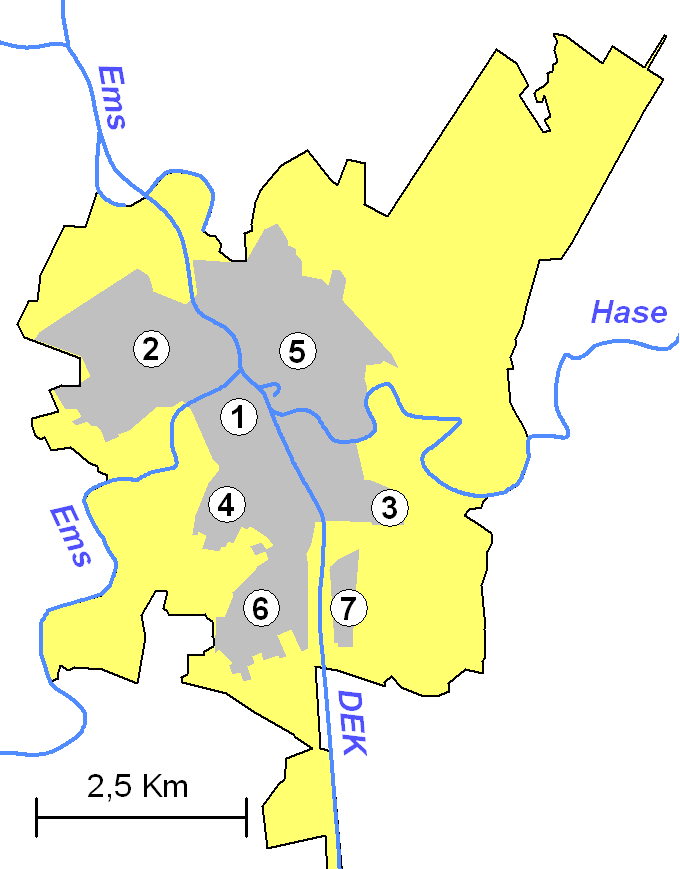

1st Altstadt
Historical centre of Meppen with historical town hall.

2nd Esterfeld

3rd Feldkamp

4th Kuhweide

5th Neustadt

6th Nödike

7th Schleusengruppe

=== Villages in Meppen ===
In 1974, 13 independent, surrounding municipalities were integrated into Meppen.

1. Apeldorn
2. Bokeloh
3. Borken
4. Groß Fullen
5. Klein Fullen
6. Helte
7. Hemsen
8. Holthausen
9. Hüntel
10. Rühle
11. Schwefingen
12. Teglingen
13. Versen

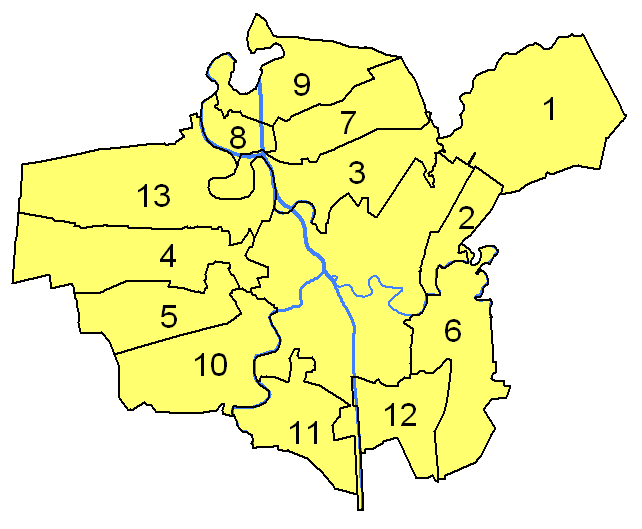

== History ==
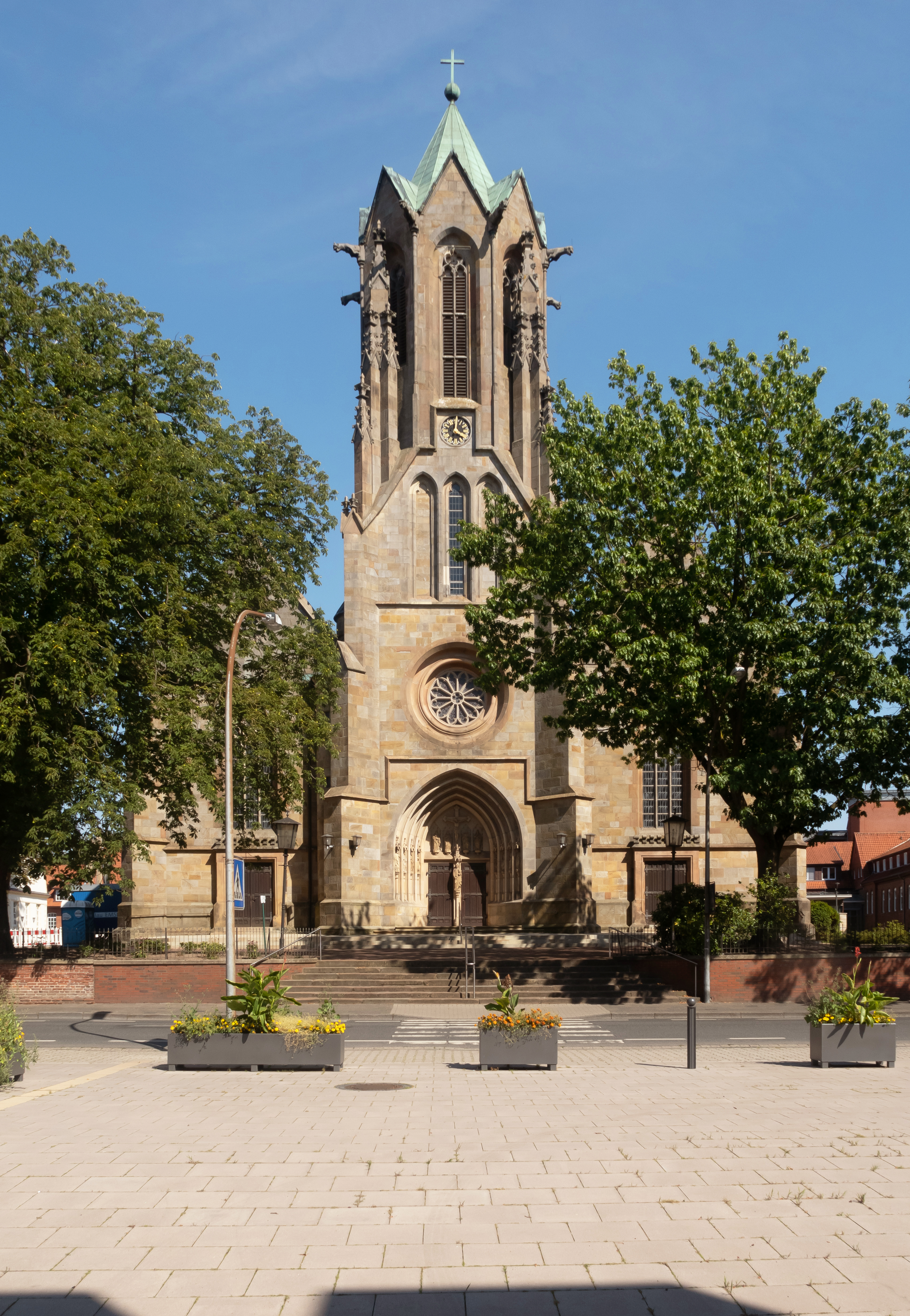
Late Gothic St Vitus church

Meppen, formerly a fortified town, boasts 12 centuries of history. The first documented mention of Meppen dates from 834, in a deed of donation by Frankish emperor Louis the Pious, transferring a missionary establishment of that name to the abbey of Corvey.

Emperor Otto the Great granted the settlement coin minting and toll rights in 945, followed by market rights in 946.

In 1252, Countess Jutta von Vechta-Ravensberg sold her possessions to the Bishop of Münster, incorporating Meppen into the Lower Prince-Bishopric of Münster (Niederstift Münster) Bishop Adolf granted town rights and permission to construct fortifications in 1360. These fortifications were built up over three centuries until 1660, before being demolished in the Seven Years War.

Following the Reichsdeputationshauptschluss of 1803, Meppen became the capital of the Duchy of Arenberg under Louis Engelbert. It was incorporated into the First French Empire in 1811 as a cantonal seat. After a period of Prussian occupation between 1813 and 1814, the Congress of Vienna awarded Meppen and the Duchy of Arenberg to the Kingdom of Hanover. The Town connected to the Hanoverian West Railway in 1855. Hanover was annexed as a Prussian province in 1866, and Meppen subsequently became part of the unified German Empire in 1871.

During the November 1938 pogroms (Kristallnacht), local Nazi police and SA members destroyed the town synagogue, plundered Jewish property, and deported several Jewish residents to the Oranienburg concentration camp. In 1939, Stalag VI-B was established in Meppen-Versen, housing Polish, French, Belgian, Soviet, and Italian Prisoners of war. In 1944, the camp was converted into a subcamp of the Neuengamme concentration camp, where over 1,700 forced laborers were held under severe conditions, over 20 percent died. Canadian forces (the Argyll and Sutherland Highlanders of Canada) liberated the town on 8 April 1945.

Following World War II and the abolition of Prussia in 1946, Meppen became part of the state of Lower Saxony. District reforms in 1977 merged the former districts of Lingen, Meppen, and Aschendorf Hümmling into the Emsland district, with Meppen serving as the administrative seat.

== Culture and sights ==
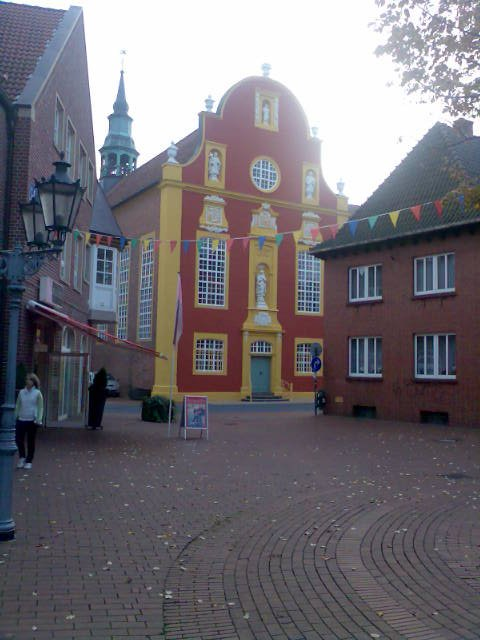
The Gymnasium church

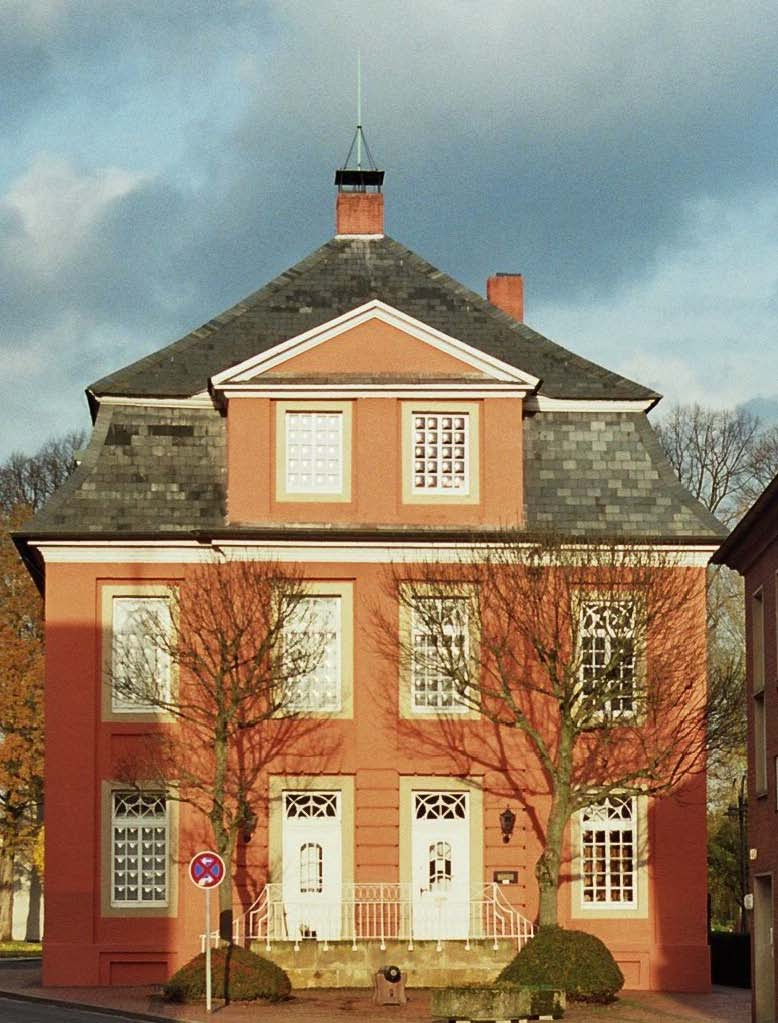
Arenbergische Rentei

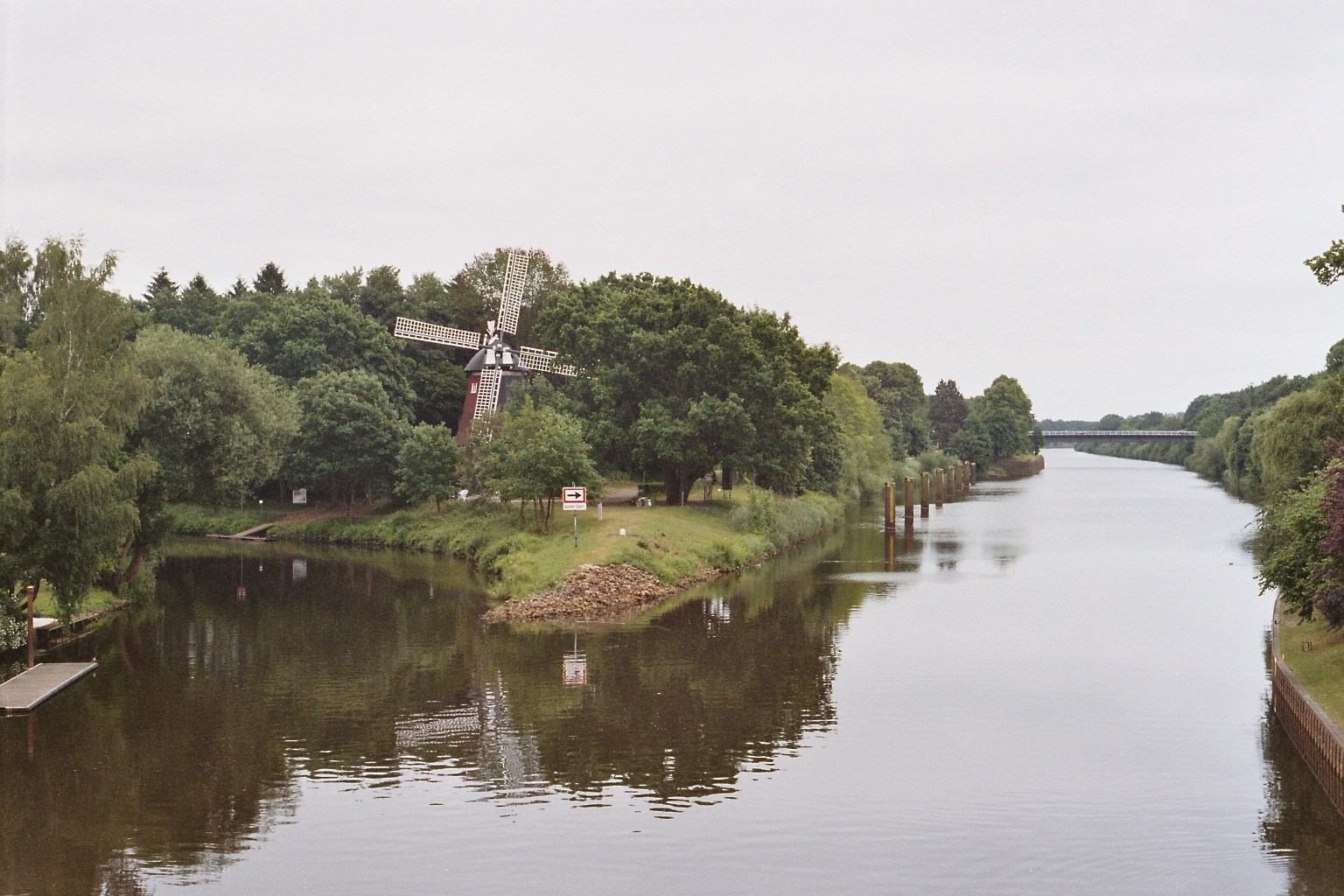
The Hölting Mill

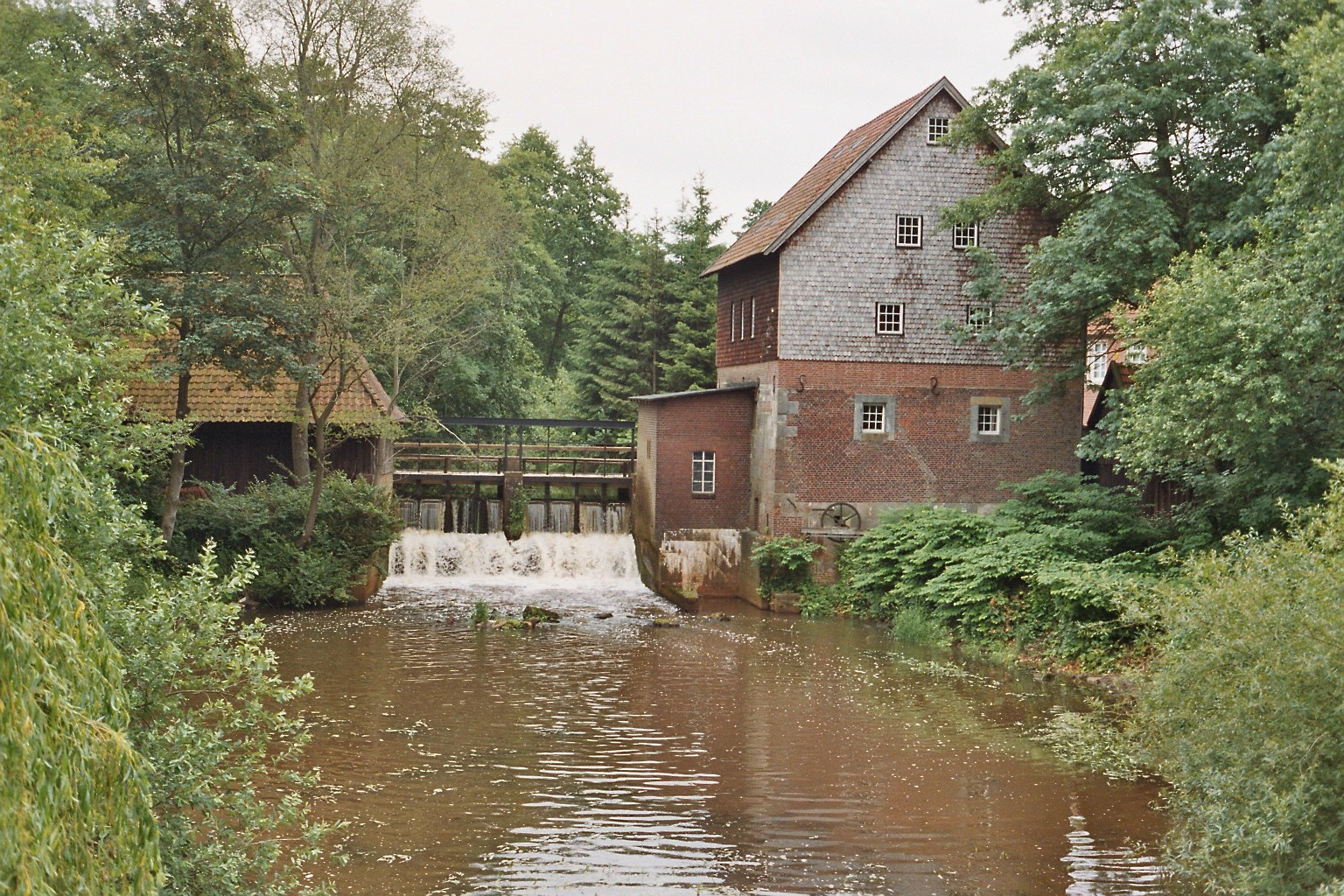
The Herrenmühle

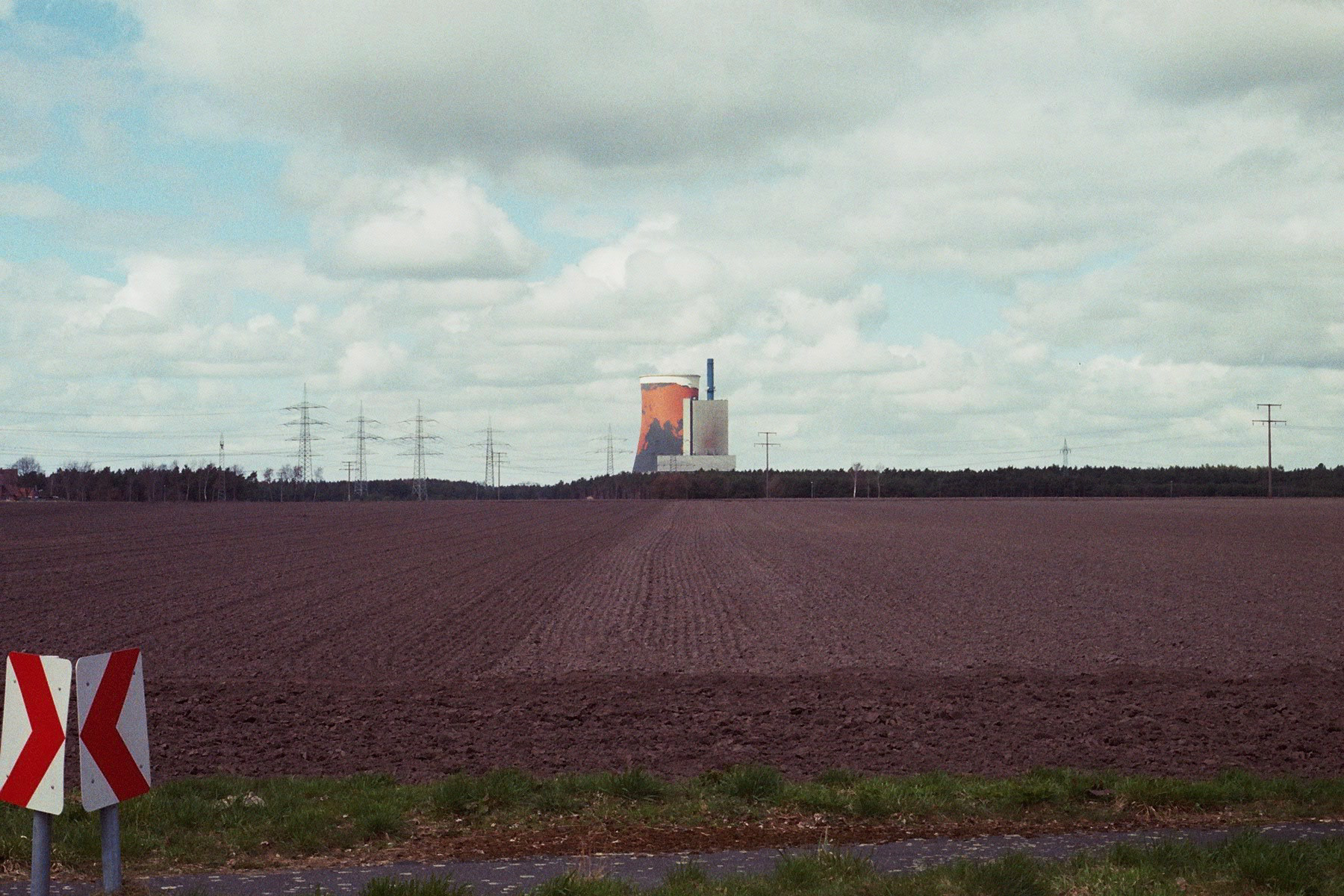
Meppen-Hüntel Power Station

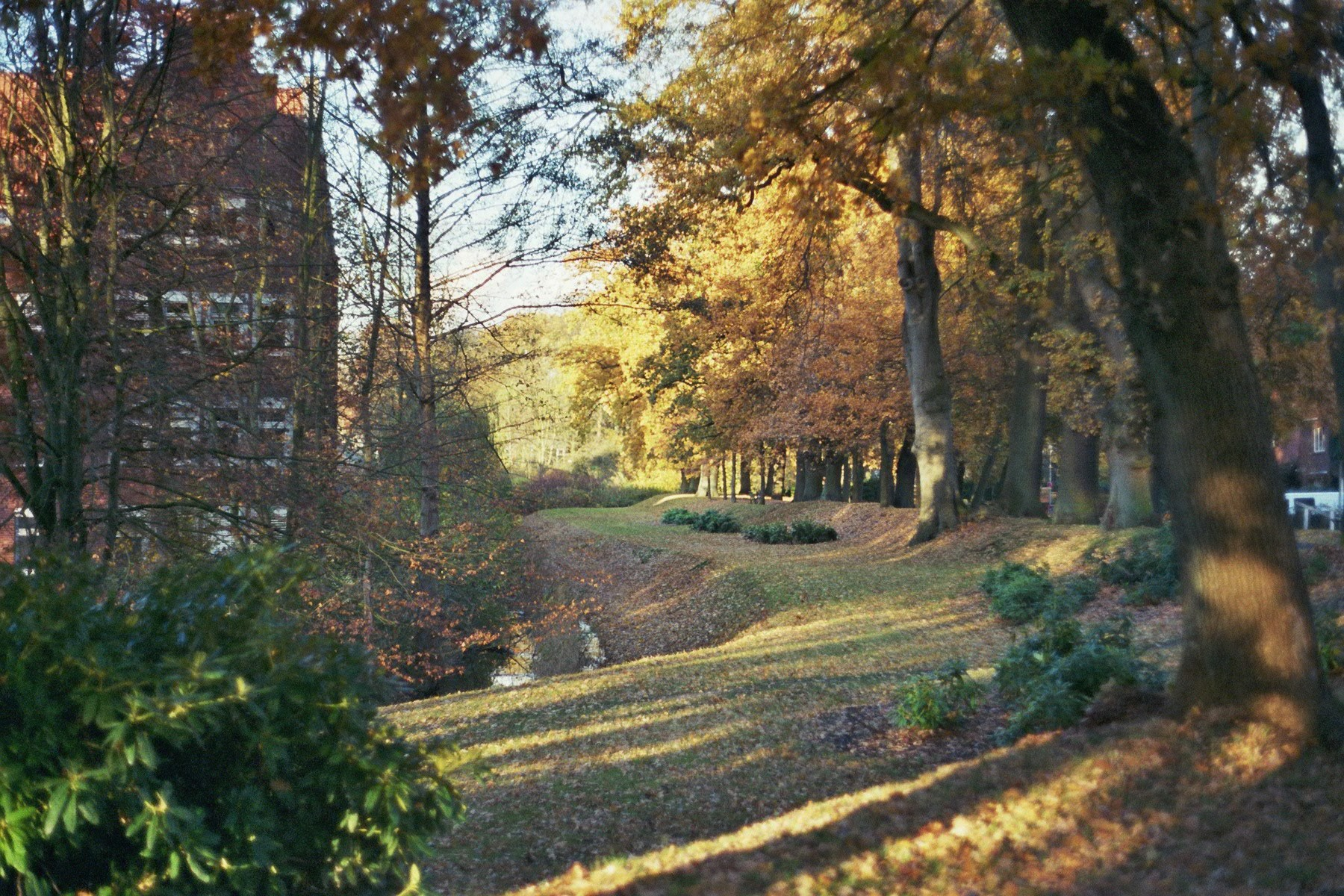
Town wall

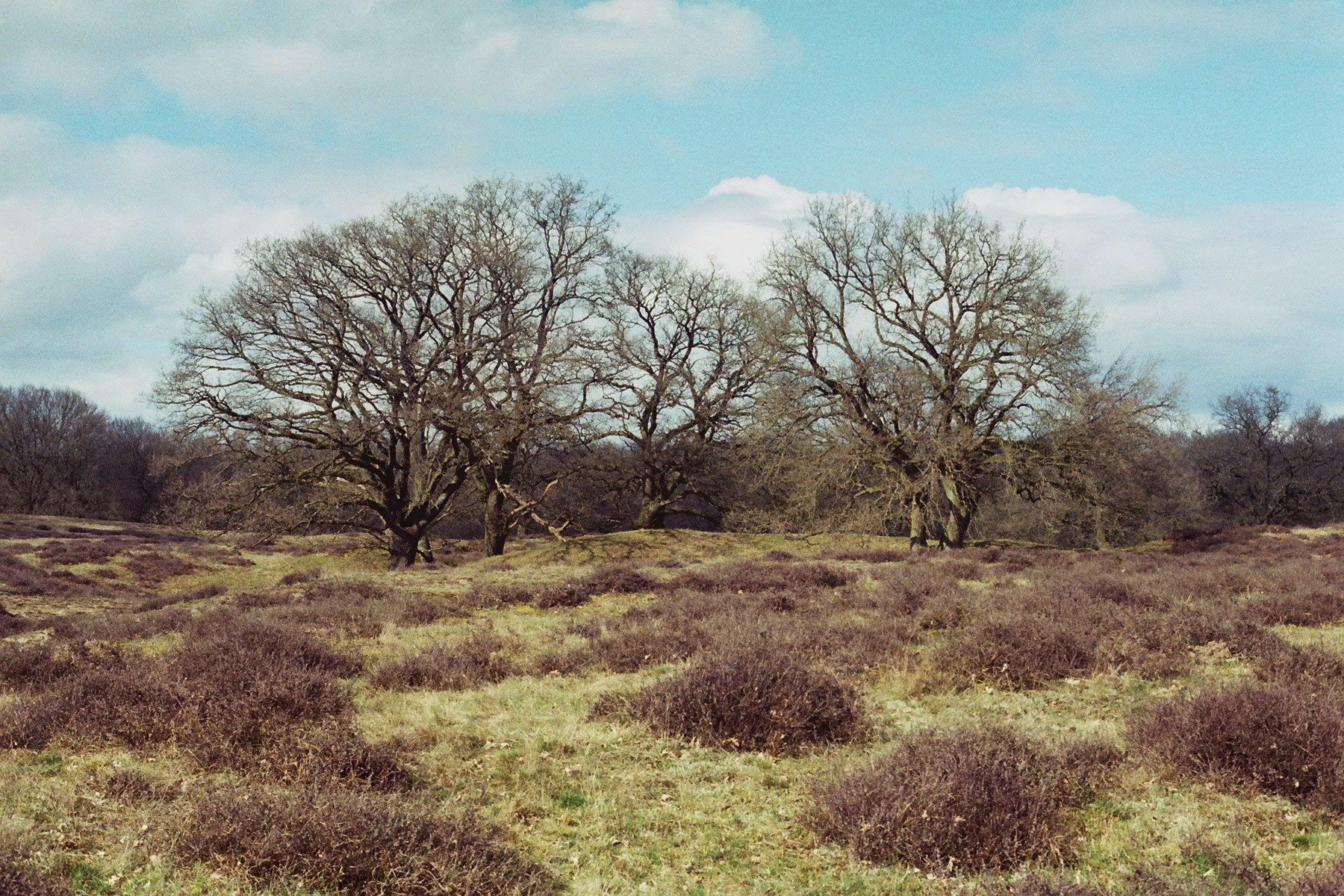
Borkener Paradies

=== Theatre ===
Between September and April the Meppen Theatre Group (Theatergemeinde Meppen) offers a comprehensive programme. Productions take place in the Meppen Theatre and Concert Hall, which was designed by Eberhard Kulenkampff and completed in 1959. It also acts as a school hall for the Windthorst Gymnasium. The programme includes both touring theatre productions as well as musical events of various genres.

From May to September, the Emsland Open Air Stage at Meppen (Emsländische Freilichtbühne Meppen) offers visitors a family musical and an evening event, mostly based on musical productions. More than 30,000 visitors come each year to the open air theatre in Esterfeld Forest to see large musical performances involving casts of up to 100.

=== Museums ===
- Town Museum in the Arenberg Rentei in Obergerichtsstraße, built by August Reinking
- Exhibition Centre for the Archaeology of the Emsland on Koppelschleuse street
- Art exhibitions in the arts centre on Koppelschleuse street

=== Buildings ===
- Around 1461–62 the Priory Church of St. Vitus was built as a three-aisled late Gothic hall church. Whilst there were only wooden churches in the surrounding area, at this sport there was already a simple stone building as early as the 9th century. This was expanded in the 11th century; the heart of the present tower being one of the additions. Further expansion in the 13th century resulting in the Bridle and North Portals being built.
- The Residenz, which today houses the council and the headmaster's office of the Windthorst Gymnasium, was built between 1726 and 1729. Later, in 1743–46, the Gymnasium Church was built onto the Residenz under the Pater Superior, Karl Immendorf.
- The town hall (Rathaus), today the symbol of the town, was constructed in 1408 from glacial erratics. From 1601 to 1605 it was considerably expanded and an additional brick storey added. In order to increase the floor area for the upper storey, an open arched hall was erected in front of the building. The stepped gable with its semi-circular elements was heavily based on Münster prototypes at (Rothenburg 44, built 1583, and the Krameramtshaus of 1589). At the start of the 19th century the building appears to have fallen considerably into disrepair, because the Arenberg architect, Josef Niehaus, was invited by the town submit an assessment for its renovation. He recommended that the ruined tower was demolished and the ornamentation of the gable removed, but initially that came to nought. In 1885 the ornamentation was finally removed and the gable end furnished with a plain triangular gable. In addition the turret of the staircase tower at the side, added in 1611 was demolished due to its poor condition. In 1909 it was decided to rebuild the tower and gable in their present form. Inside the building is a 1605 sandstone fireplace.
- The armoury (Zeughaus) was built in 1752 on the site of the former castle, the Paulsburg (residence of the seneschal or Drost, built in 1374) by order of Prince-Elector Clemens August. It was to act as a store room for weapons, munitions, uniforms and battle equipment for soldiers studying at Meppen Fortress. In the 19th century the building was used for commercial purposes and survives today as a private residence, albeit with a number of structural alterations.
- The history of the Herrenmühle, a water mill on the Nordradde stream, goes back to the 16th century. It is used today for cultural events.
- Residential houses By contrast with Lingen, just a few kilometres away, the centre of Meppen has hardly any historic buildings. The town houses mainly consist of new buildings with a few 19th century brick houses. Of national significance is the Arenberg Rentei (Arenbergische Rentei) at No. 7, Obergerichtsstraße. The two-storey classical building with pilasters and a mansard roof was built as a residence in 1805 by August Reinking for the merchant, Ferdindand Frye, and his wife, Josefine Mulert. From 1835, it was used as a finance office (Rentei), it now serves as a town museum. Four years later, based on plans by the same architect, the so-called Heyl'sche Haus was built at No. 3, Emsstraße. The owner was the Duchy of Arenberg's privy councillor (Kammerrat), Anton Heyl. While the house itself was demolished in 1977 in favour of a bank, the adjoining hall, with its remarkable ornamentation, was kept and restored. Next to the huge bank, it looks rather lost. The town community centre, built in 1816 by physician, Nicholas Vagedes, not far from the town hall, has housed the town council since 1936. Amongst the few remaining timber-framed buildings are the single-storey houses No. 24, Kuhstraße and No. 12, Im Sack. The former dates essentially to the 16th century and is one of the oldest buildings in the town. It has been expanded and extended several times. No. 12 Im Sack, by contrast, was built in 1797 and still has a gateway to the hall or threshing floor (Dielentor). Today, it houses the offices of the newspaper and the senior citizens' volunteer agency.
- The Koppelschleuse locks, built between 1826 and 1830, have survived in its original state as part of the old Ems–Hase Canal.
- The Hölting Mill (Höltingmühle), a smock mill, was probably built in 1639 near Bockhorn in the county of Friesland. The mill was bought by the Hölting Citizens Preservation Society and re-erected during the town's 600th anniversary celebrations in 1959–60 on the tongue of land between the Dortmund–Ems Canal and the River Hase. Inside the mill today is a café, which is open during summer weekends. Civil ceremonies also take place in the mill.
- On the 131-metre-high cooling tower of the now closed Meppen-Hüntel Peak Load Gasworks is, according to the Guinness Book of Records, is the largest map of the world in the world. It was painted by the Swiss artist, Christoph Rihs.
- The Meppener Högerhaus, a former administrative building for the county of Meppen, (built 1936–1937) was designed by architect, Fritz Höger. Today a police station is housed in the double-winged, brick building on Bahnhofstraße, with its hipped roof. The entrance staircase on the southwest side is dominated by an archway.

=== Parks ===
- The former counterscarp of Meppen Fortress has survived and forms part of a park area with trees.

=== Natural monuments ===
- In the parish of Borken is the Borkener Paradies Nature Reserve, a historic wood pasture.

== Population statistics ==
The population figures in the table below include the villages belonging to the town of Meppen.

Year	Inhabitants	Year	Inhabitants	Year	Inhabitants	Year	Inhabitants	Year	Inhabitants
1821*	4,815	1848*	5,130	1905*	7,687	1939*	15,045	1950*	19,141
1971*	27,305	1990	30,508	2005	34,196	2010	34.944	2015	34,918
2020	35,313	2022	36,721						

== Transport ==
=== Air ===
The nearest airports are Münster Osnabrück Airport, located 109 km (68 mi) south east and Bremen Airport, located 155 km (96 mi) north east of Meppen.

== Notable people ==
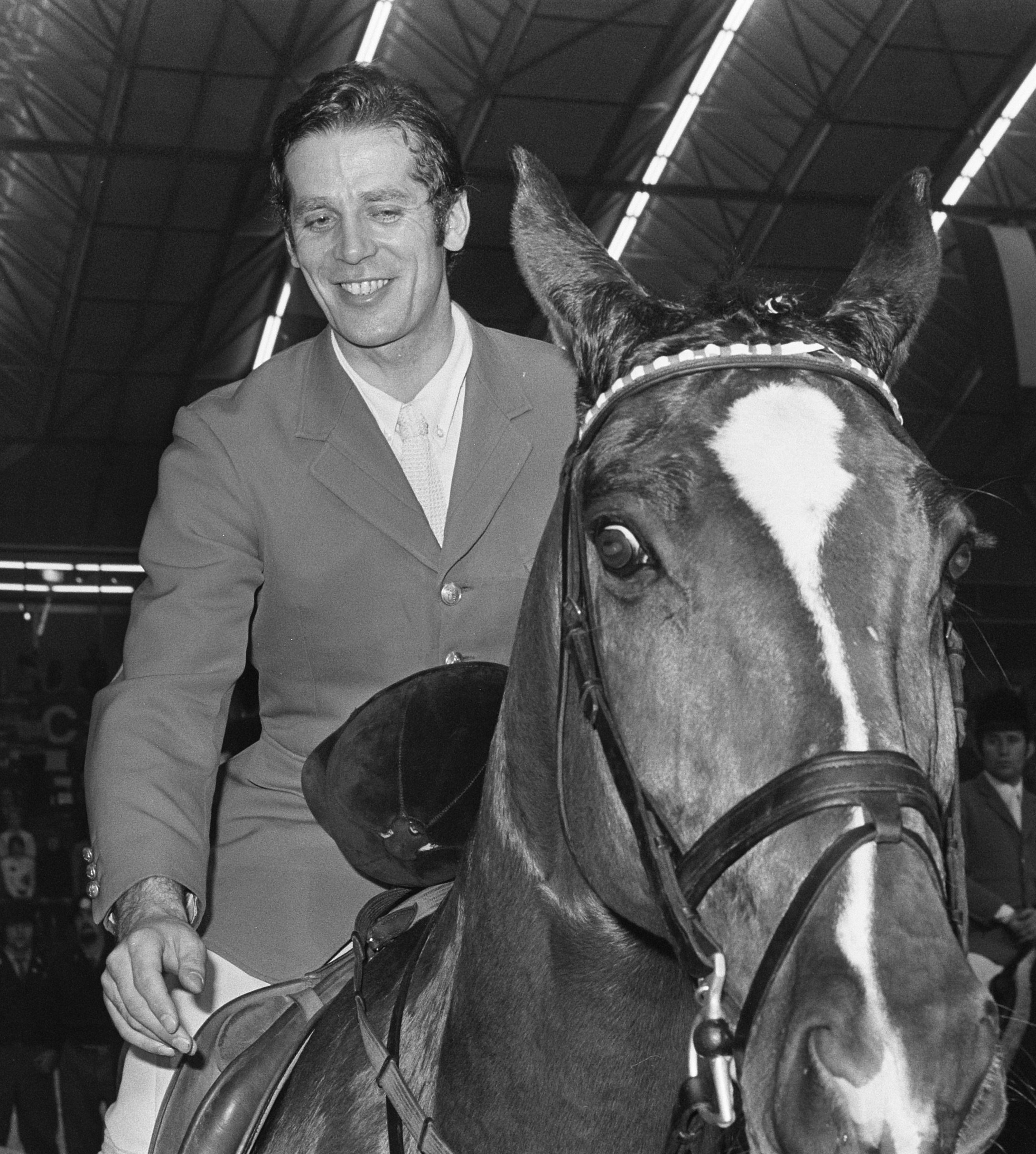
Alwin Schockemöhle, 1972

- Levin Schücking (1814-1883), a German novelist.
- Ferdinand Schöningh (1815-1883), German bookseller and publisher
- Karl Brandi (1868–1946), a German historian.
- Gerd Zacher (1929–2014), composer, organist and writer on music.
- Hermann Lause (1939-2005), film actor; appeared in more than seventy films
- Hermann Korte (1949-2020), academic specialising in German literature, language and linguistics.
- Richard Wiese (born 1953), German linguist who studies the phonology and morphology of German

=== Sport ===
- Maurits van Löben Sels (1876–1944), a Dutch épée, foil and sabre fencer; team bronze medallist at the 1906 Intercalated Games
- Alwin Schockemöhle (born 1937), former show-jumper, gold medallist at the 1976 Summer Olympics and team medallist at several other Olympics
- Thomas Bröker (born 1985), a retired footballer who played 349 games
- Jana Franziska Poll (born 1988), volleyball player, 87 caps with the Germany women's national volleyball team
- Nils Zumbeel (born 1990), footballer who played over 275 games

== Sport clubs ==
- SV Meppen (football)
- SV Union Meppen (football, tennis, gymnastics, volleyball, table tennis, athletics)

== Twin towns – sister cities ==
Meppen is twinned with:

- Ostrołęka, Poland

== Gallery ==
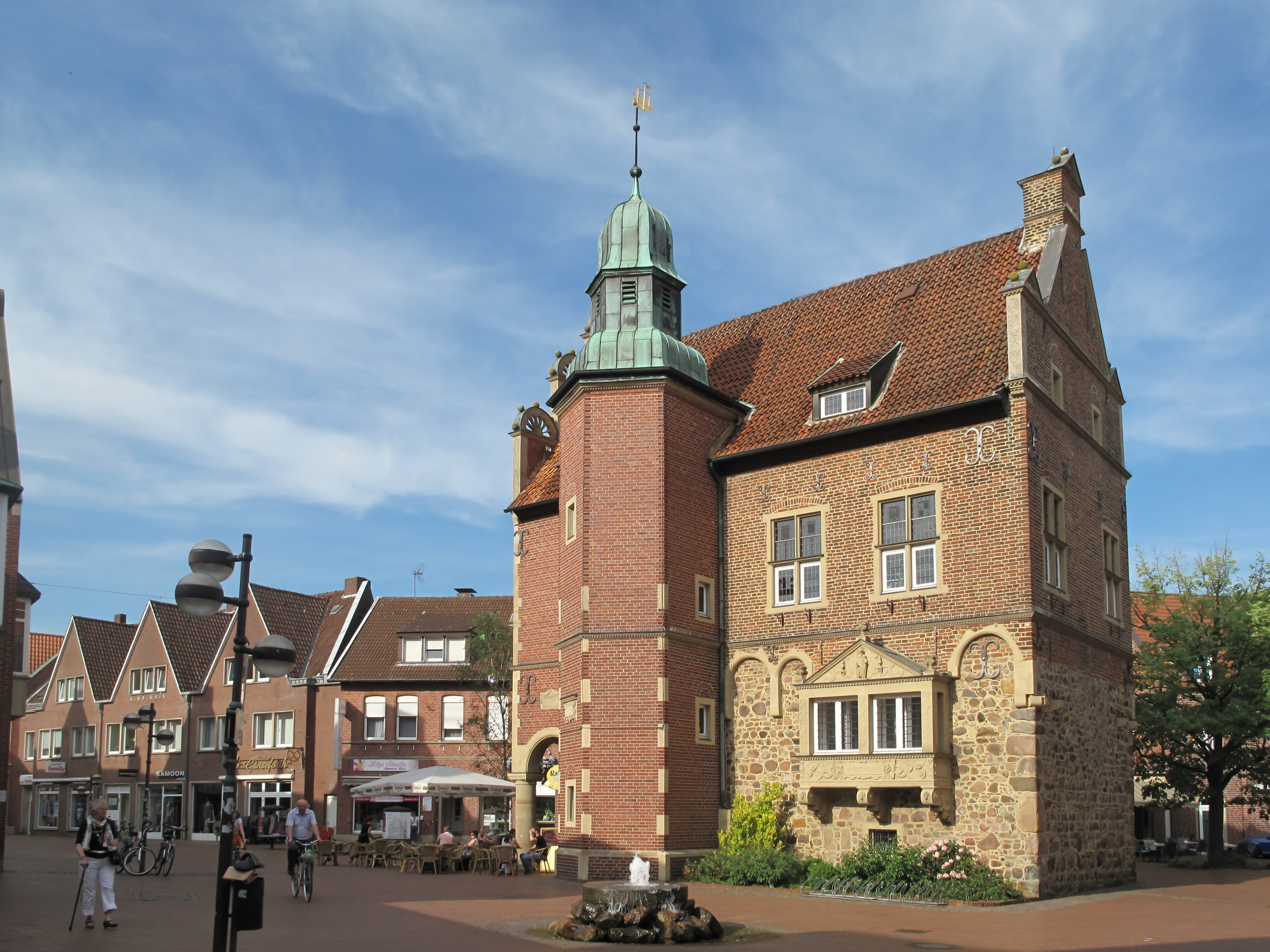
Town hall

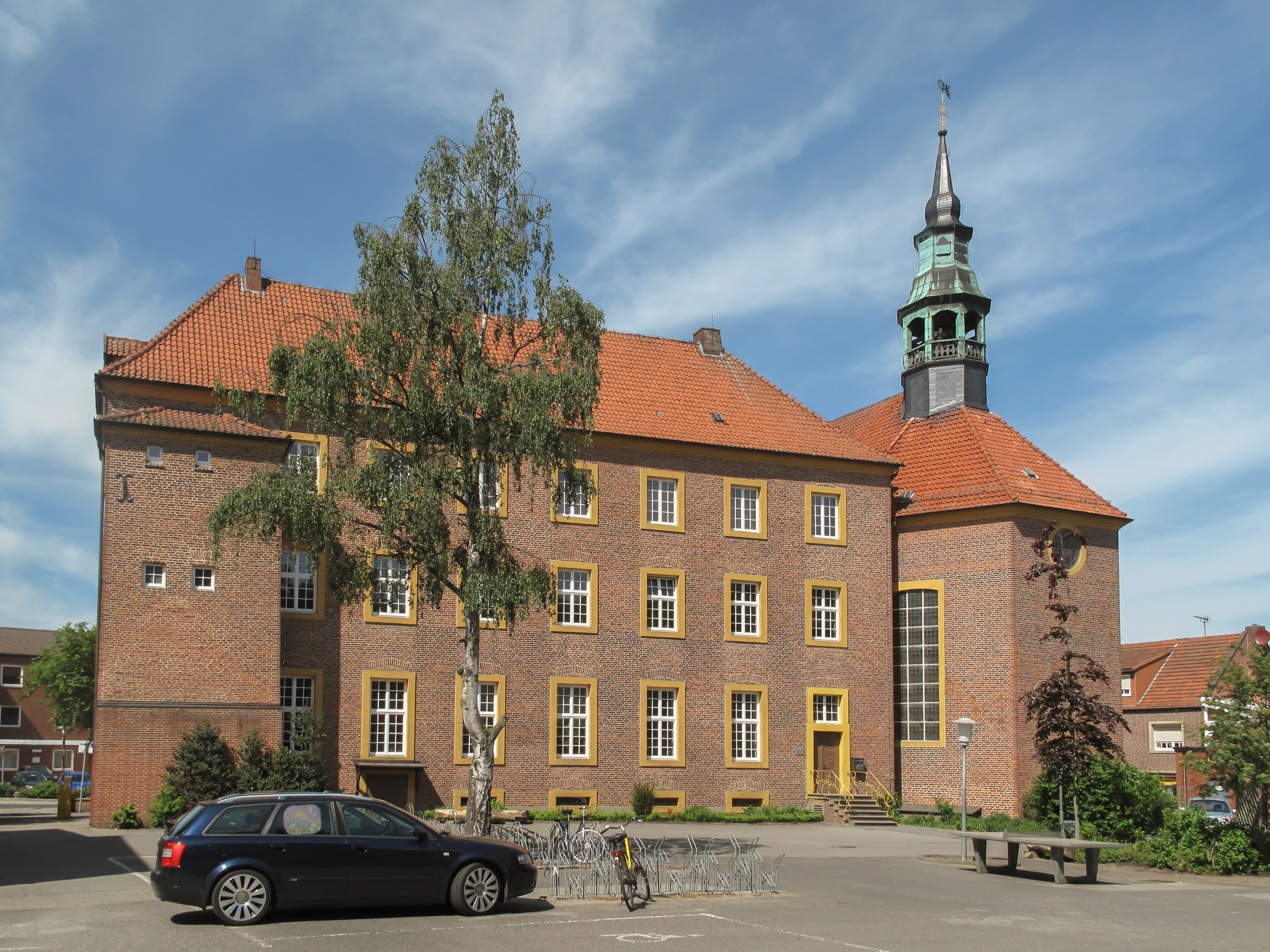
Gymnasium

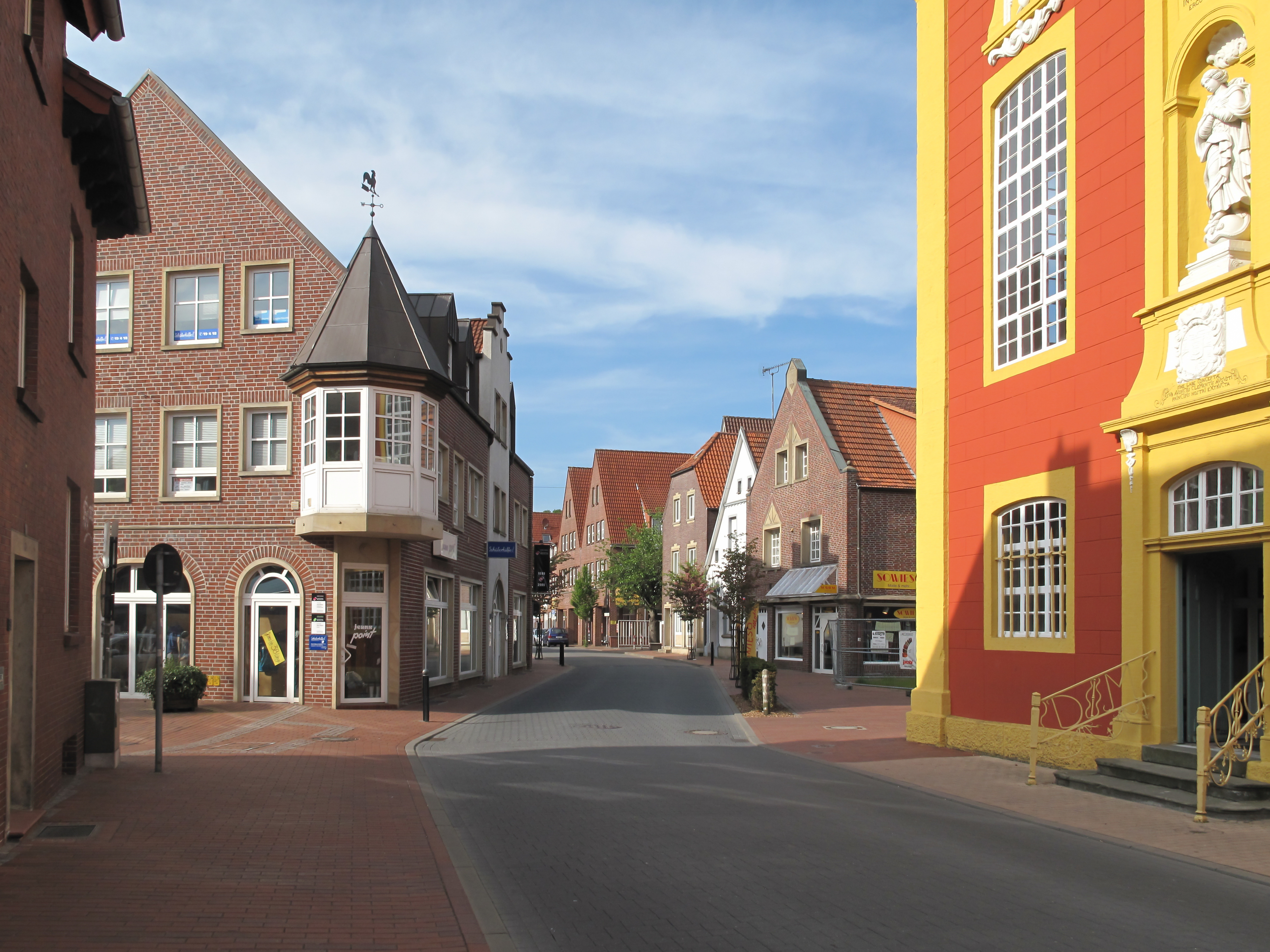
A street in the town centre

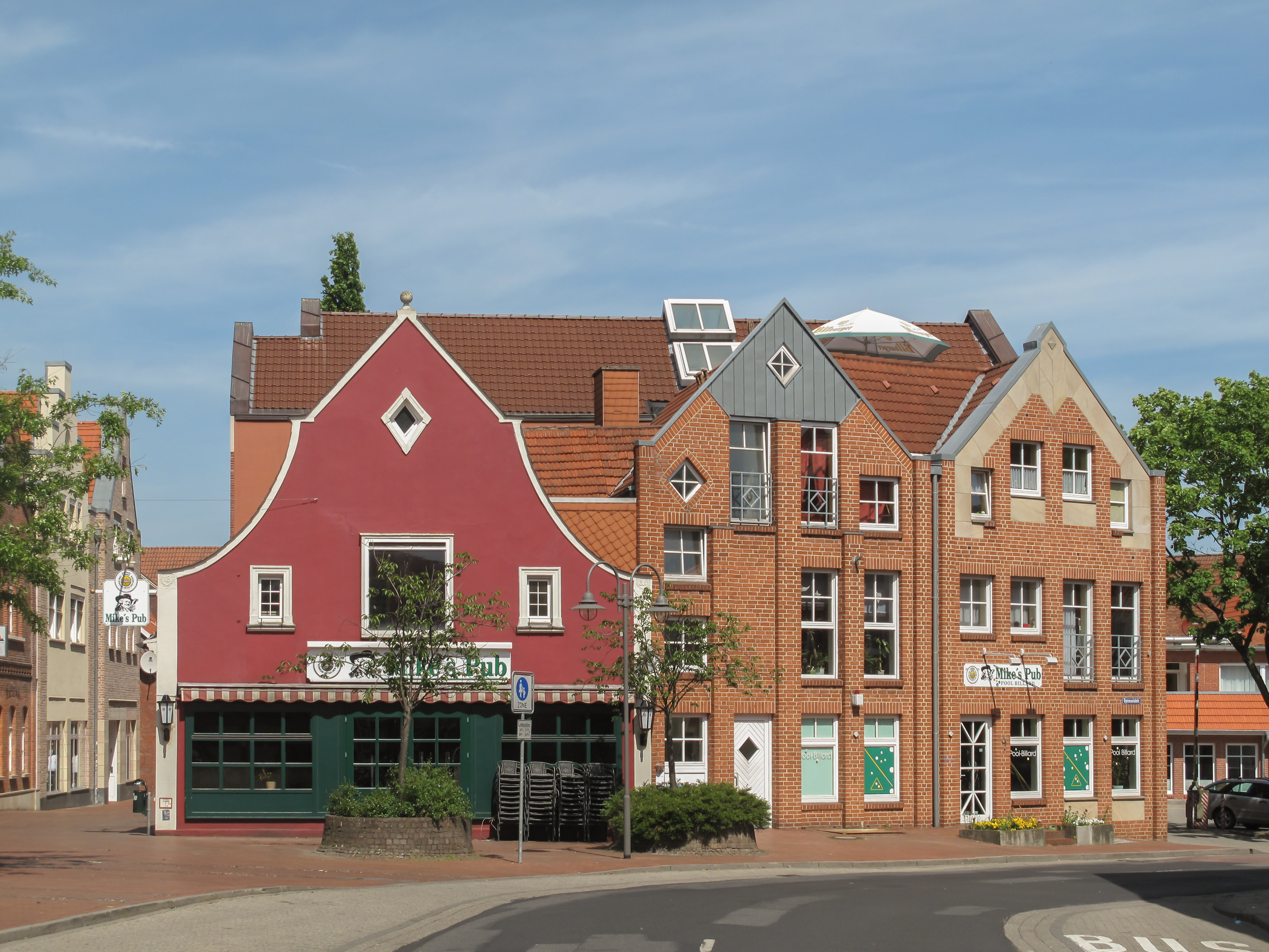
Buildings in the town centre

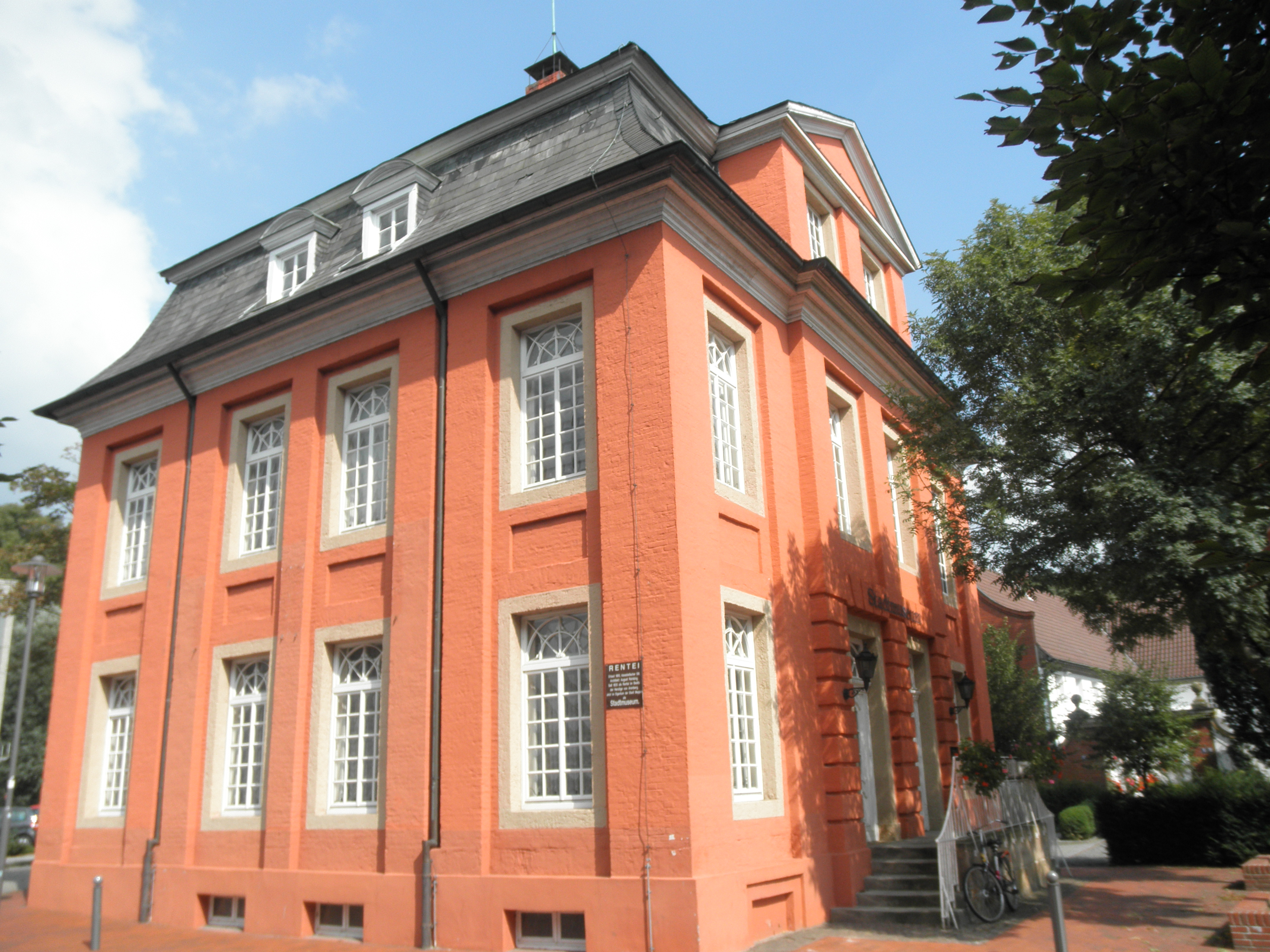
Museum

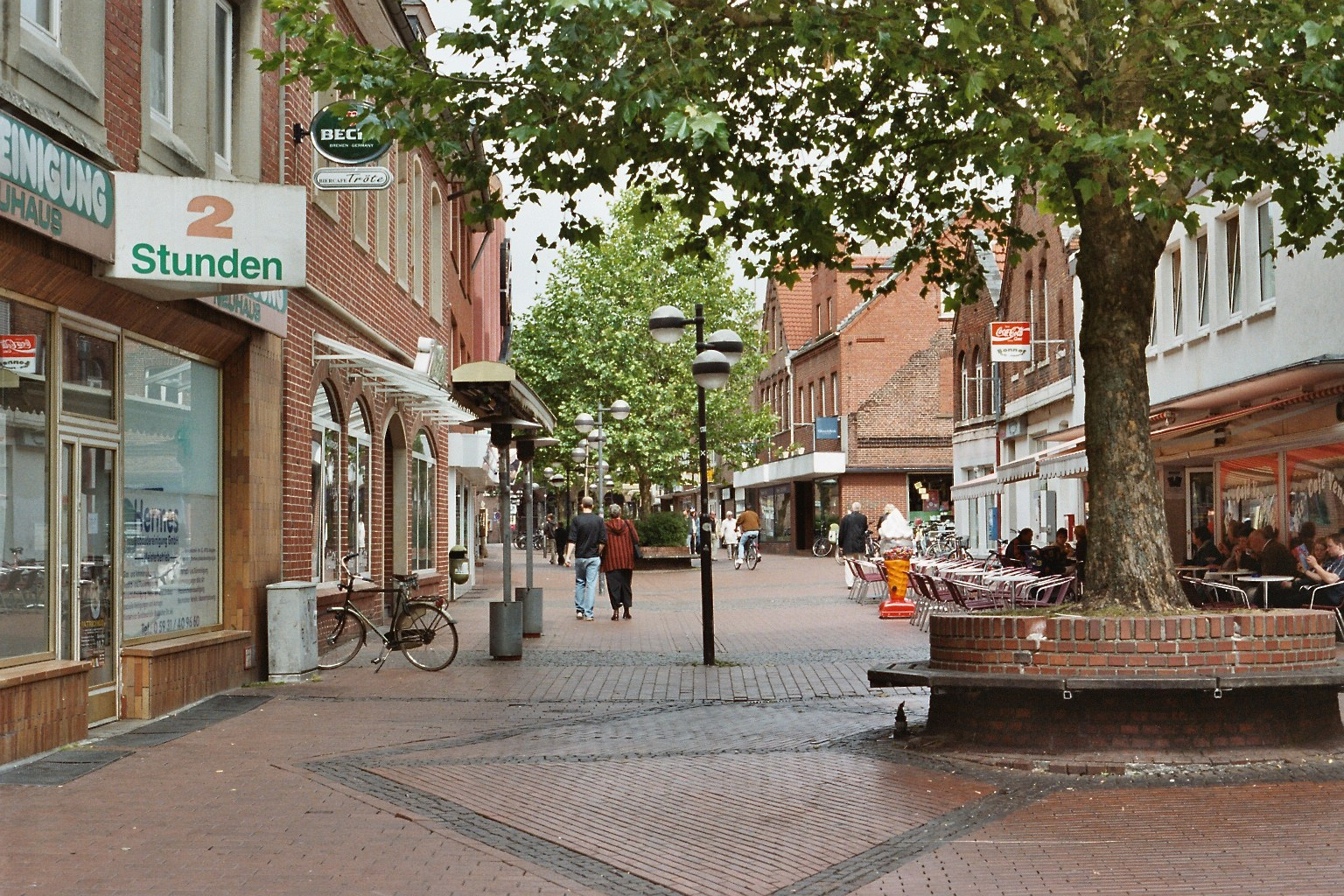
Pedestrian zone on Bahnhofstraße

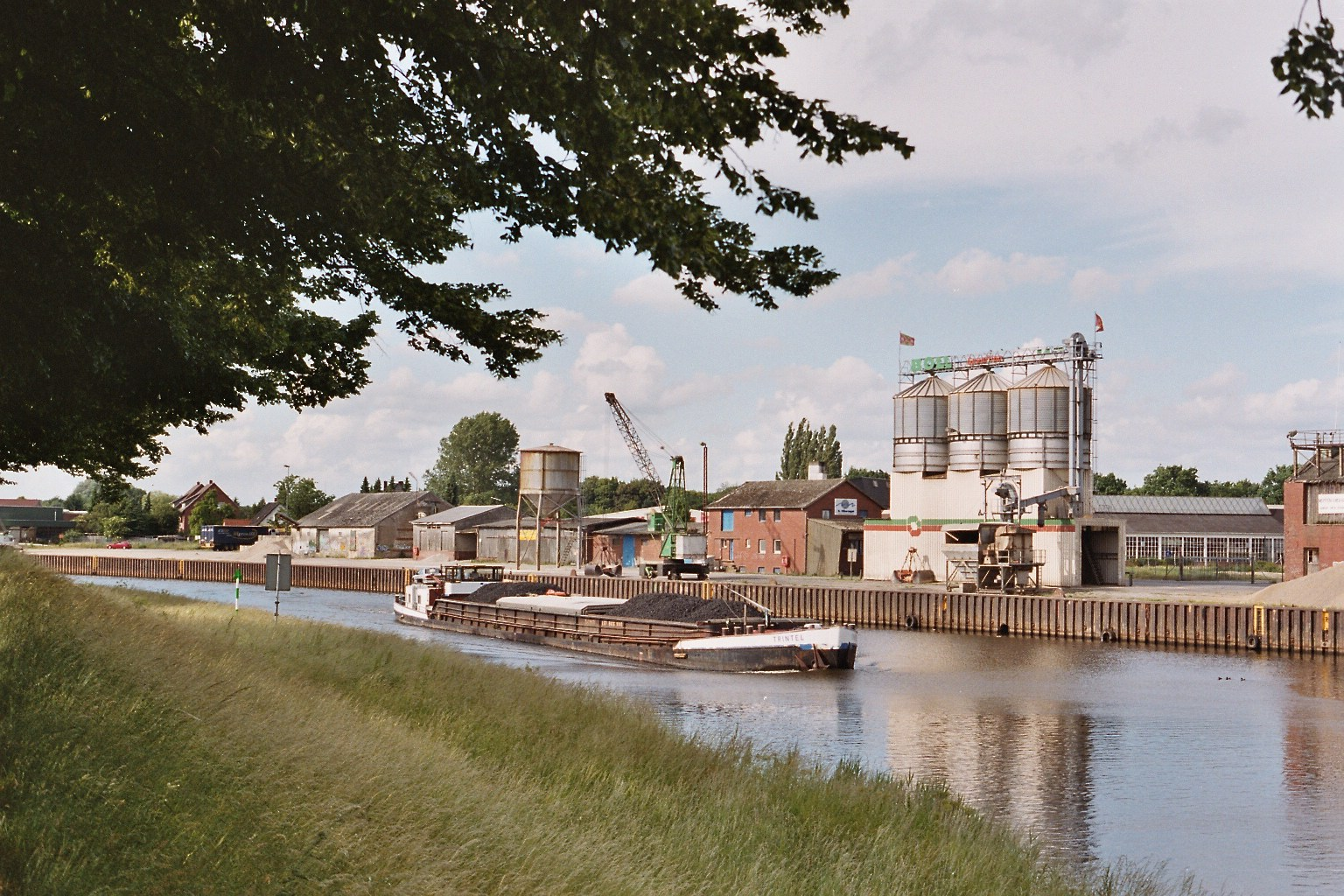
Meppen's old harbour

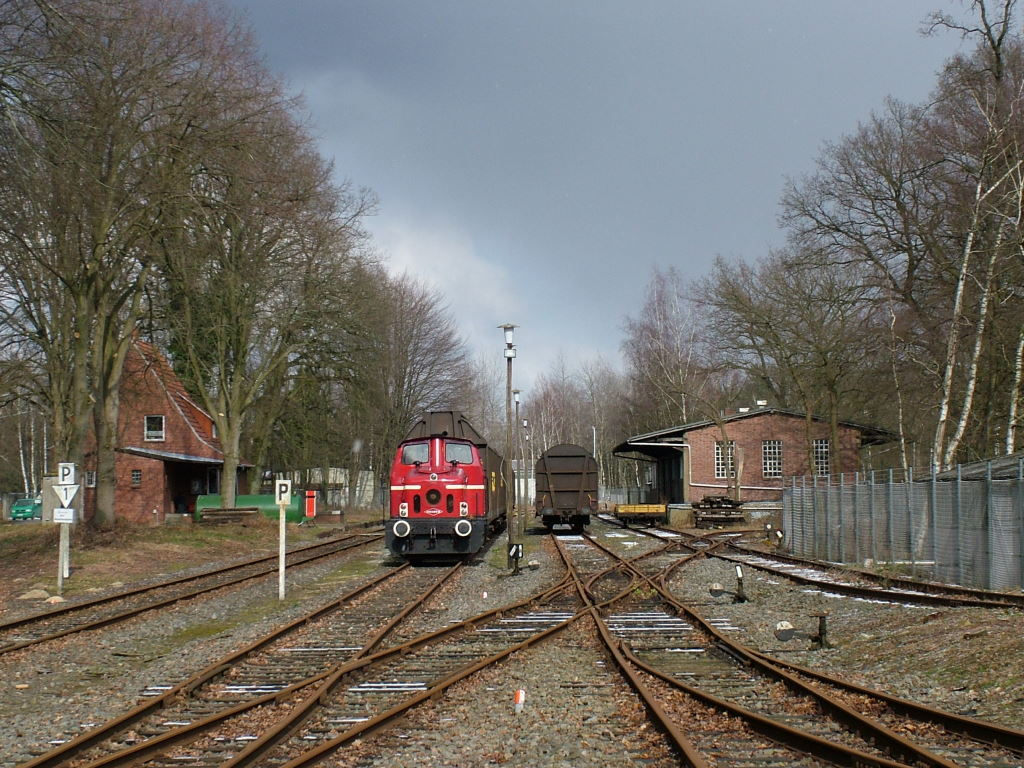
Vormeppen railway station

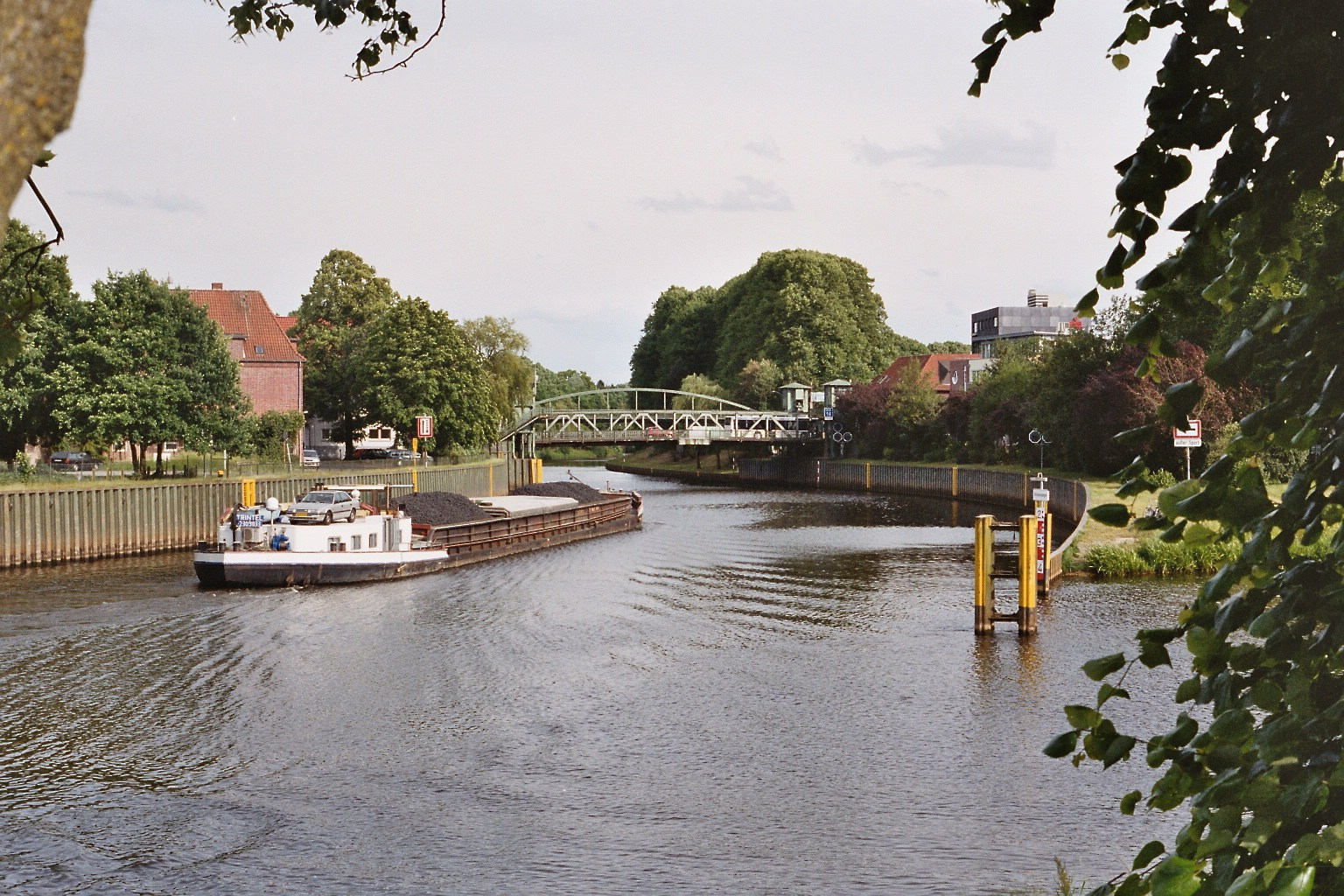
Ems River in Meppen

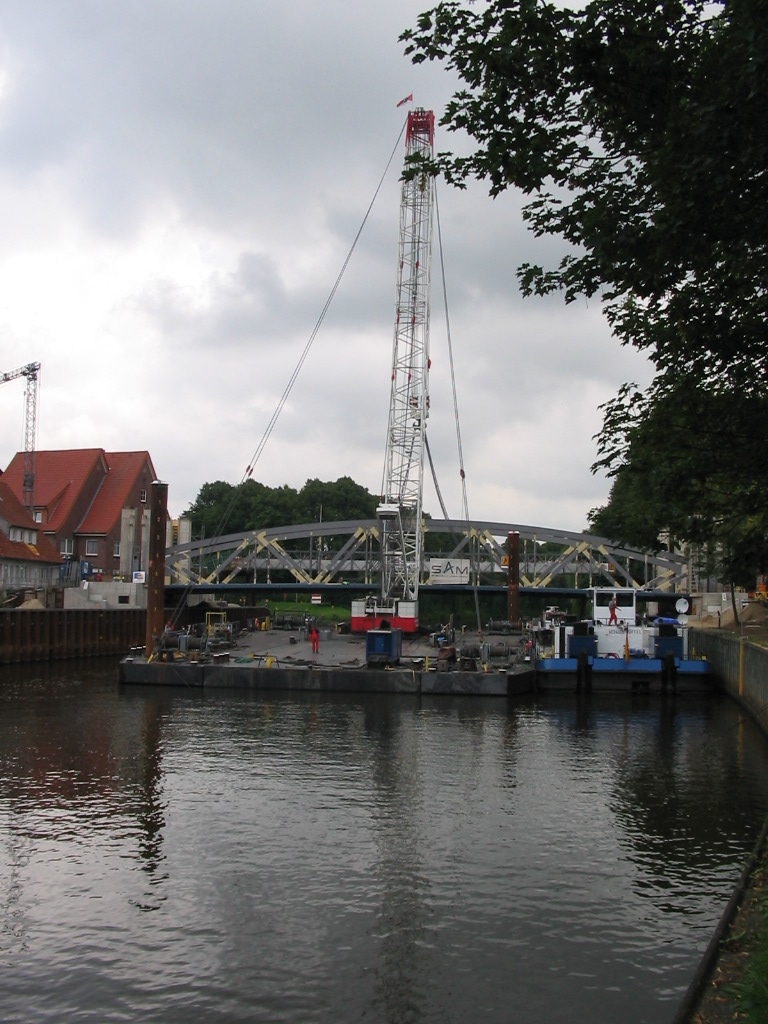
Installing the new lifting bridge in 2007
