= Hörspielpreis der Kriegsblinden =

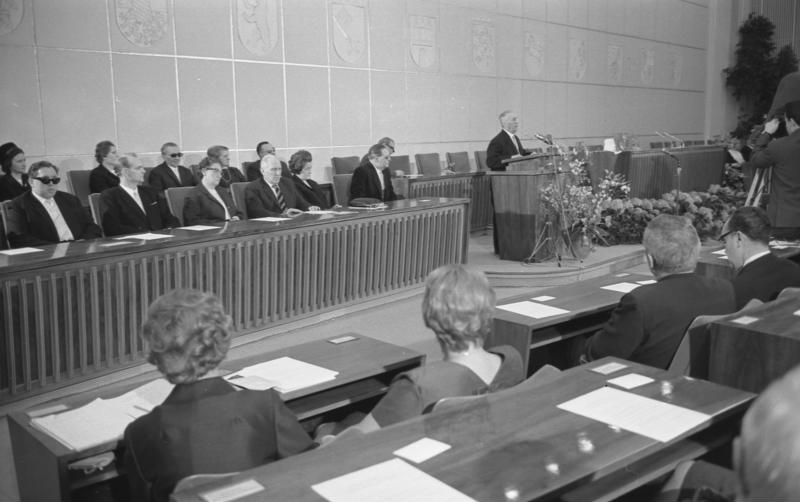
1965 award ceremony for the Kriegsblindenpreis

The Hörspielpreis der Kriegsblinden (War Blinded Audio Play Prize), also known as the Kriegsblindenpreis (War Blinded Prize) is the most important literary prize granted to playwrights of audio plays written in the German language. The award was established in 1950 by the Bund der Kriegsblinden Deutschlands e.V. (BKD), a German organization for soldiers and civilians blinded during war, whether from working with munitions or explosives or from a bomb attack or while in flight from an attack.

== Rules ==
Der Hörspielpreis der Kriegsblinden is awarded every year "for an original audio play, conceived and produced by a German language broadcaster, that realizes and expands the possibilities of the art form in an outstanding manner. This original audio play must have its initial broadcast in the previous year." Broadcasters and jury members are allowed to submit entries. The prize is given out in the Bundesrat in Berlin and at Hotel Petersberg in alternating years. The prize consists of a small sculpture, newly designed each year by a war-blinded artist. Traditionally, the winning play is later broadcast on all participating radio stations.

== Jury composition ==
The jury is composed of seven war blinded (since 2007, other blinded individuals are also included), seven critics, and five other jurors from the Film and Media Foundation of North Rhine-Westphalia. Since 1994, the Bund der Kriegsblinden and the Foundation have worked together to disseminate the award.

== Award winners ==
The year listed below is the year the award was granted; the plays were generally produced and originally broadcast during the previous year.

- 1952: Darfst du die Stunde rufen? by Erwin Wickert, direction: Walter Knaus (SDR)
- 1953: Die Andere und ich by Günter Eich, direction: Cläre Schimmel (SDR), Gustav Burmester (NWDR)
- 1954: Nachtstreife by Heinz Oskar Wuttig, direction: Peter Thomas (RIAS)
- 1955: Prinzessin Turandot by Wolfgang Hildesheimer, direction: Gert Westphal (NWDR)
- 1956: Philemon und Baucis by Leopold Ahlsen, direction: Walter Ohm (BR), Fritz Schröder-Jahn (NWDR)
- 1957: Die Panne by Friedrich Dürrenmatt, direction: Gustav Burmester (NDR)
- 1958: Die Versuchung by Benno Meyer-Wehlack, direction: Fritz Schröder-Jahn (NDR)
- 1959: Der gute Gott von Manhattan by Ingeborg Bachmann, direction: Fritz Schröder-Jahn (BR/NDR)
- 1960: Auf einem Maulwurfshügel by Franz Hiesel, direction: Egon Monk (NDR/ORF)
- 1961: Der Minotaurus by Dieter Wellershoff, direction: Friedhelm Ortmann (SDR)
- 1962: Totentanz by Wolfgang Weyrauch, direction: Martin Walser (NDR/BR)
- 1963: Geh David helfen by Hans Kasper, direction: Ulrich Lauterbach (RB/HR)
- 1964: Der Bussard über uns by Margarete Jehn, music: Peter Zwetkoff, direction: Peter Schulze-Rohr (SWF/NDR)
- 1965: Nachtprogramm by Richard Hey, direction: Fritz Schröder-Jahn (NDR/HR/SFB)
- 1966: Miserere by Peter Hirche, direction: Oswald Döpke (WDR)
- 1967: Zwielicht by Rolf Schneider, direction: Otto Kurth (BR/HR/WDR)
- 1968: Das Aquarium by Christa Reinig, direction: Raoul Wolfgang Schnell (SDR)
- 1969: Fünf Mann Menschen by Ernst Jandl and Friederike Mayröcker, direction: Peter Michel Ladiges (SWF)
- 1970: Paul oder die Zerstörung eines Hörbeispiels by Wolf Wondratschek, direction: Heinz Hostnig (WDR/BR/HR/SR)
- 1971: Zwei oder drei Porträts by Helmut Heißenbüttel, direction: Heinz Hostnig (BR/NDR/SWF)
- 1972: Preislied by Paul Wühr, directed by the author (BR/NDR)
- 1973: Der Tod meines Vaters by Hans Noever, directed by the author (BR/WDR)
- 1974: Das große Identifikationsspiel by Alfred Behrens, directed by the author (BR/RIAS)
- 1975: Goldberg-Variationen by Dieter Kühn, direction: Heinz von Cramer (BR/HR)
- 1976: Centropolis by Walter Adler, directed by the author (WDR/BR/SWF)
- 1977: Fernsehabend by Urs Widmer, directed by the author (SWF)
- 1978: Vor dem Ersticken ein Schrei (Trilogie des bürgerlichen Wahnsinns 1) by Christoph Buggert, direction: Raoul Wolfgang Schnell (WDR/BR)
- 1979: Frühstücksgespräche in Miami by Reinhard Lettau, direction: Walter Adler (SDR/HR/WDR)
- 1980: Der Tribun written and directed by Mauricio Kagel (WDR)
- 1981: Moin Vaddr läbt oder A Ballahd inne Munnohrd kinstlich mit Mosseg unde Jesann von Wullar Kinnpussku by Walter Kempowski, direction: Horst H. Vollmer (HR)
- 1982: Hell genug und trotzdem stockfinster by Peter F. Steinbach, direction: Bernd Lau (WDR)
- 1983: Die Brautschau des Dichters Robert Walser im Hof der Anstaltswäscherei von Bellelay, Kanton Bern by Gert Hofmann, direction: Hans Rosenhauer (NDR/HR)
- 1984: Wald. Ein deutsches Requiem written and directed by Gerhard Rühm (WDR)
- 1985: Nachtschatten by Friederike Roth, direction: Heinz von Cramer (SDR/NDR/RIAS)
- 1986: Die Befreiung des Prometheus. Hörstück in neun Bildern by Heiner Goebbels and Heiner Müller, direction: Heiner Goebbels (HR/SWF)
- 1987: Drei Männer im Feld by Ludwig Harig, direction: Hans Gerd Krogmann (WDR)
- 1988: Leben und Tod des Kornettisten Bix Beiderbecke aus Nord-Amerika. Eine Radio-Ballade by Ror Wolf, direction: Heinz Hostnig (SWR/HR/NDR/WDR)
- 1989: Wer Sie sind by Peter Jacobi, direction: Dieter Carls (WDR)
- 1990: Ein Nebulo bist du by Jens Sparschuh, direction: Norbert Schaeffer (SR/SWF/SDR)
- 1991: Stille Helden siegen selten written and directed by Karl-Heinz Schmidt-Lauzemis and Ralph Oehme (HR/Sachsenradio/SFB)
- 1992: Die sehr merkwürdigen Jazzabenteuer des Herrn Lehmann. Ein Jazz-Hörspiel written and directed by Horst Giese (RIAS/author)
- 1993: Sense by Werner Fritsch, direction: Norbert Schaeffer (SWF)
- 1994: Unser Boot nach Bir Ould Brini by Christian Geissler, direction: Hermann Naber (SWF)
- 1995: Apocalypse Live by Andreas Ammer / FM Einheit / Ulrike Haage, direction: Andreas Ammer / F.M. Einheit (BR/Bayerisches Staatsschauspiel (Marstall)/Bavarian State Opera)
- 1996: Frauentags Ende oder die Rückkehr nach Ubliaduh by Fritz Rudolf Fries, direction: Wolfgang Rindfleisch (MDR)
- 1997: Compagnons und Concurrenten oder Die wahren Künste by Ingomar von Kieseritzky, direction: Joachim Staritz (SDR/DLR)
- 1998: Die graue staubige Straße written and directed by Ilona Jeismann and Peter Avar (SFB)
- 1999: Rafael Sanchez erzählt: Spiel mir das Lied vom Tod by Rafael Sanchez and Eberhard Petschinka, Regie: Eberhard Petschinka (WDR/MDR/ORF)
- 2000: Unter dem Gras darüber written and directed by Inge Kurtz and Jürgen Geers (HR)
- 2001: Pitcher written and directed by Walter Filz (WDR)
- 2002: Crashing Aeroplanes (Fasten your seat belts) written and directed by Andreas Ammer / FM Einheit (WDR/DLR)
- 2003: Rosebud written and directed by Christoph Schlingensief (WDR)
- 2004: Jackie by Elfriede Jelinek, direction: Karl Bruckmaier (BR)
- 2005: Stripped – Ein Leben in Kontoauszügen by Stefan Weigl, direction: Thomas Wolfertz (WDR)
- 2006: Föhrenwald written and directed by Michaela Melián (BR)
- 2007: Ein Menschenbild, das in seiner Summe Null ergibt by Schorsch Kamerun, directed by the author (WDR)
- 2008: Karl Marx: Das Kapital, Erster Band written and directed by Helgard Haug and Daniel Wetzel (Rimini Protokoll) (DLF/WDR)
- 2009: Ruhe 1 written and directed by Paul Plamper (WDR, Museum Ludwig Köln)
- 2010: Die Sicherheit einer geschlossenen Fahrgastzelle by Thilo Reffert, direction: Stefan Kanis (MDR)
- 2011: Schicksal, Hauptsache Schicksal. Hörspiel nach Motiven aus Joseph Roths „Die Legende vom heiligen Trinker“ by Robert Schoen with Lorenz Eberle, directed by the author in cooperation with HR
- 2012: Testament. Verspätete Vorbereitungen zum Generationswechsel nach Lear by She She Pop, directed by the authors (D-Kultur)
- 2013: Ooops, wrong planet! by Gesine Schmidt, direction: Walter Adler (DLF/WDR)
- 2014: Hate Radio by Milo Rau, direction: Milena Kipfmüller (WDR/ORF)
- 2015: Ickelsamers Alphabet – Dictionarium der zierlichen Wörter by the Liquid Penguin Ensemble (Katharina Bihler, Stefan Scheib), directed by the authors (SR/D-Kultur)
- 2016: Und jetzt: Die Welt! by Sibylle Berg and Marina Frenk, direction: Stefan Kanis (MDR)
- 2017: Screener by Lucas Derycke, directed by the author (WDR)
- 2018: Coldhaven by John Burnside, direction: Klaus Buhlert (SWR)
- 2019: Auf der Suche nach den verlorenen Seelenatomen by Susann Maria Hempel, performance, music and direction by the author (RBB)
- 2020: AUDIO.SPACE.MACHINE by Christian Wittmann and Georg Zeitblom, composition and direction by the authors (DLF/NDR/SWR)
- 2021: Atlas by Thomas Köck, direction: Heike Tauch (MDR)

== Sources ==
- Bund der Kriegsblinden Deutschland, "Hörspielpreis der Kriegsblinden. Reden der Preisträger seit 1952" in: Der Kriegsblinde. Zeitschrift für Verständnis und Verständigung Vols. 3 to 58, Marburg, 1952–2007 (in German)
- HörWelten. 50 Jahre Hörspielpreis der Kriegsblinden. Aufbau-Verlag, Berlin (2001). ISBN 3-351-02515-7. (See: Christian Hörburger und Hans-Ulrich Wagner, "Hören hat seinen Preis: Eine Chronik der Preisträger" pp. 89–190) (in German)
- „Kunst für die Ohren“ 60 Jahre Hörspielpreis der Kriegsblinden Conversation with Juror Frank Olbert (in German)
- Frank Olbert: "60 Jahre Hörspielpreis der Kriegsblinden" SWR2 96-minute radio feature (2011) (in German)
