= Friedrich-Hölderlin-Preis =

German literary award

Friedrich-Hölderlin-Preis is a German literary prize. It was established in 1983. The City of Bad Homburg vor der Höhe awards the prize annually in June. It is endowed with 20,000 euros and is awarded as a general literary award for outstanding achievements. The award commemorates the poet Friedrich Hölderlin who lived in Bad Homburg for a few years. It is awarded at the anniversary of the evening before Friedrich Hölderlin's death. Since 2023, the prize has been awarded every two years.

== Recipients ==
- 1983: Hermann Burger
- 1984: Sarah Kirsch
- 1985: Ulla Hahn
- 1986: Elisabeth Borchers
- 1987: Peter Härtling
- 1988: Karl Krolow
- 1989: Wolf Biermann
- 1990: Rolf Haufs
- 1991: Günter Kunert
- 1992: Hilde Domin
- 1993: Friederike Mayröcker
- 1994: Ludwig Harig
- 1995: Ernst Jandl
- 1996: Martin Walser
- 1997: Doris Runge
- 1998: Christoph Ransmayr
- 1999: Reiner Kunze
- 2000: Marcel Reich-Ranicki
- 2001: Dieter Wellershoff
- 2002: Robert Menasse
- 2003: Monika Maron
- 2004: Johannes Kühn
- 2005: Durs Grünbein
- 2006: Rüdiger Safranski
- 2007: Urs Widmer
- 2008: Ror Wolf
- 2009: Judith Hermann
- 2010: Georg Kreisler
- 2011: Arno Geiger
- 2012: Klaus Merz
- 2013: Ralf Rothmann
- 2014: Peter Stamm
- 2015: Michael Kleeberg
- 2016: Christoph Peters
- 2017: Eva Menasse
- 2018: Daniel Kehlmann
- 2019: Anke Stelling
- 2020: Navid Kermani
- 2021: Marcel Beyer
- 2022: Monika Rinck
- 2023: Leif Randt
- 2025: Christian Lehnert
