= Klaus Merz =

Swiss writer

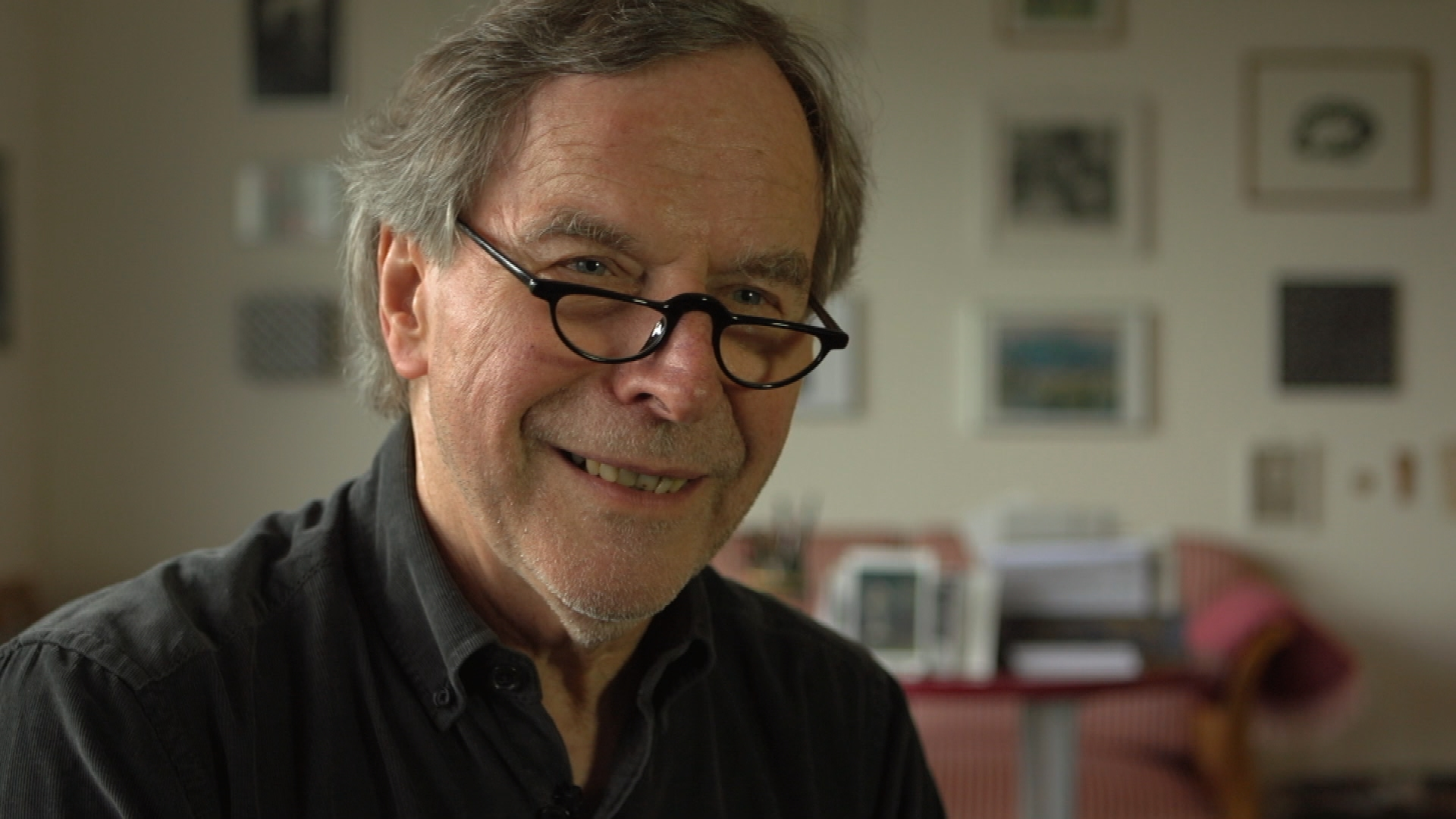
Klaus Merz

Klaus Merz (born 3 October 1945 in Aarau, canton Aargau) is a Swiss writer, who writes in German.

== Life ==
As a teacher (secondary school), Merz has worked in adult education. He has won several prices, e.g. the famous Hermann Hesse Prize for Literature in 1997, the Gottfried-Keller-Preis in 2004 and the Werkpreis der schweizerischen Schillerstiftung in 2005.

He wrote a lot of narrations and stories, e.g. Adams Kostüm or the short novel Jakob schläft. Merz has also made poems (Kurze Durchsage) – his works are rather short. But the titles already show Merz's special ability: He manages it, to place two or three banal words, one next to the other, and it starts "buzzing" amongst them.

Today, Merz lives in Unterkulm as a narrator and lyric poet.

== Selected bibliography ==
- Mit gesammelter Blindheit. Gedichte. Tschudy, St. Gallen 1967.
- Geschiebe – mein Land. Gedichte. Sauerländer, Aarau 1969.
- Vier Vorwände ergeben kein Haus. Gedichte. Artemis, Zürich 1972.
- Obligatorische Übung. Geschichten. Sauerländer, Aarau 1975.
- Latentes Material. Erzählungen. Sauerländer, Aarau 1978.
- Der Entwurf. Erzählung. AutorenEdition, München 1982.
- Landleben. Geschichten. Howeg, Zürich 1982.
- Bootsvermietung. Prosa, Gedichte. Howeg, Zürich 1985.
- Tremolo Trümmer. Erzählungen. Ammann, Zürich 1988.
- Nachricht vom aufrechten Gang. Prosa, Gedichte. Howeg, Zürich 1991.
- Am Fuss des Kamels. Geschichten & Zwischengeschichten. Haymon, Innsbruck 1994.
- Kurze Durchsage. Gedichte & Prosa. Nachwort von Werner Morlang. Haymon, Innsbruck 1995.
- Jakob schläft. Eigentlich ein Roman. Nachwort von Peter von Matt. Haymon, Innsbruck 1997, Fischer Taschenbuch, Frankfurt am Main 2006
- Kommen Sie mit mir ans Meer, Fräulein? Roman. Haymon, Innsbruck 1998.
- Garn. Prosa und Gedichte. Haymon, Innsbruck 2000.
- Adams Kostüm. Drei Erzählungen. Haymon, Innsbruck 2001.
- Das Turnier der Bleistiftritter. Achtzehn Begegnungen. Nachwort von Markus Kutter. Haymon, Innsbruck 2003.
- Die Tiere ziehen los! Eine Entdeckungsreise in die Fluss-Auen. Bilderbuch (mit Petra Rappo). Atlantis, Zürich 2003.
- Löwen Löwen. Venezianische Spiegelungen. Haymon, Innsbruck 2004.
- Los. Eine Erzählung. Haymon, Innsbruck 2005.
- Kunos große Fahrt. Bilderbuch (mit Hannes Binder). NordSüd, Gossau 2005.
- Priskas Miniaturen. Zwanzig Erzählungen 1978–1988. Nachwort von Werner Morlang. Haymon, Innsbruck 2005.
- Der gestillte Blick. Sehstücke. Haymon, Innsbruck 2007.
- Der Argentinier. Novelle. Pinselzeichnungen von Heinz Egger. Haymon, Innsbruck 2009.
- Aussicht mit Zimmer. Texte zu Fotos von Stephan Schenk. Steidl, Göttingen 2009.
- Aus dem Staub. Gedichte. Haymon, Innsbruck 2010.
- Unerwarteter Verlauf. Gedichte. Haymon, Innsbruck 2013.
- Helios Transport. Gedichte. Haymon, Innsbruck 2016.
- Flüsterndes Licht. Ein Kettengedicht. Gemeinsam mit Nora Gomringer, Marco Grosse, Annette Hagemann und Ulrich Koch. Haymon, Innsbruck 2017.
- firma. Prosa Gedichte. Mit acht Pinselzeichnungen von Heinz Egger. Haymon, Innsbruck-Wien 2019.

=== Complete edition ===
- Band 1: Die Lamellen stehen offen. Frühe Lyrik 1963–1991. Haymon, Innsbruck 2011.
- Band 2: In der Dunkelkammer. Frühe Prosa 1971–1982. Haymon, Innsbruck 2011.
- Band 3: Fährdienst. Prosa 1983–1995. Haymon, Innsbruck 2012.
- Band 4: Der Mann mit der Tür oder Vom Nutzen des Unnützen. Feuilletons. Haymon, Innsbruck 2013.
- Band 5: Das Gedächtnis der Bilder. Texte zu Malerei und Fotografie. Haymon, Innsbruck 2014.
- Band 6: Brandmale des Glücks. Prosa 1996–2014. Haymon, Innsbruck 2014.
- Band 7: Außer Rufweite. Lyrik 1992–2013. Haymon, Innsbruck 2015.

== Awards ==
- 1979: Prize of the Schiller Foundation, Switzerland (Latentes Material)
- 1992: Literature Prize Aargau, Switzerland
- 1996: Solothurner Literaturpreis, Switzerland
- 1997: Prize of the Schiller Foundation, Switzerland (Jakob schläft)
- 1997: Hermann-Hesse-Literaturpreis, Karlsruhe, Germany (Jakob schläft)
- 1999: Prix Littéraire Lipp (Frère Jacques)
- 2004: Gottfried-Keller-Preis, Zurich, Switzerland
- 2005: Prize of the Schiller Foundation, Switzerland (Los)
- 2005: Culture Prize Aargau
- Book Prize Zurich 1992, 1994, 1997, 2001, 2005, 2010
- 2012: Poetry Prize Basel
- 2012: Friedrich-Hölderlin-Preis, Bad Homburg, Germany
- 2016: Rainer-Malkowski-Preis, Academy of Fine Arts, Munich, Germany
- 2018: Christine Lavant Prize, Vienna, Austria

== Film ==
- Merzluft. documentary about Klaus Merz. Cast: Melinda Nadj Abonji, Peter von Matt, Manfred Papst, Markus Bundi, Robert Hunger-Bühler and Heinz Egger. Director: Heinz Bütler. Production: Pixiu Films, 2015.
