= Michael Scheffel =

- Born: 27 February 1958 (age 68); Frankfurt am Main, West Germany
- Occupation: Germanist (Language/literature/linguistics)

Michael Scheffel (born 27 February 1958, Frankfurt) is a professor for the history of modern German literature and more generally of Literary sciences at Wuppertal University. He is also a co-editor of Text+Kritik.

== Life ==
After successful completion of his school career in Frankfurt Scheffel studied German Literature and linguistics, Romance studies and Art history at Tübingen, Tours and Göttingen.

He obtained his Doctorate in 1988 at Göttingen. His thesis was published in 1990 under the title "Magischer Realismus. Die Geschichte eines Begriffes und ein Versuch seiner Bestimmung". He remained at Göttingen as a research assistant, obtaining a Habilitation (promotion/qualification) in 1995 in German studies.

Internationally he has been a guest lecturer at universities in Birmingham, Coimbra, Dublin, Frankfurt, Lisbon, Pécs, Peking and Szeged. Since Autumn 2008 he has been Vice-Rector for Research, Funding and Graduate support at the University of Wuppertal.

== Published output ==
- Magischer Realismus. Die Geschichte eines Begriffes und ein Versuch seiner Bestimmung. Stauffenburg, Tübingen 1990. ISBN 3-923721-46-3.
- Formen selbstreflexiven Erzählens. Eine Typologie und sechs exemplarische Analysen. Max-Niemeyer-Verlag, Tübingen 1997. ISBN 3-484181-45-1.
- together with Matías Martínez: Einführung in die Erzähltheorie. ("Introduction to Narratology") C.H.Beck, München 1999 ff. ISBN 3-406440-52-5.
- (as editor): Erschriebene Natur. Internationale Perspektiven auf Texte des 18. Jahrhunderts. (Jahrbuch für Internationale Germanistik, Reihe A, Bd. 66) P. Lang, Bern u.a. 2001. ISBN 3-906767-14-0.
- together with Andreas Blödorn and Daniela Langer (edited): Stimme(n) im Text. Narratologische Positionsbestimmungen. De Gruyter, Berlin u. New York 2006. ISBN 3-11-018571-7.
- together with Julia Abel and Andreas Blödorn (edited): Ambivalenz und Kohärenz. Untersuchungen zur narrativen Sinnbildung. WVT, Trier 2009. ISBN 978-3-86821-138-2.
- together with Matías Martínez (edited): Klassiker der modernen Literaturtheorie. C.H. Beck, München 2010. ISBN 978-3-406-60829-2.
