= Text+Kritik =

German-language cultural journal

text+kritik
- Discipline: Literature, music, film, cultural studies
- Language: German

Publication details
- History: 1963–present
- Publisher: edition text+kritik (et+k), Munich (Germany)
- Frequency: Quarterly

Standard abbreviations
- ISO 4: Text Krit.

Indexing
- ISSN: 0040-5329

Links
- Journal homepage

Text+Kritik (stylized text+kritik) is a quarterly German journal for literature, music, film, and cultural studies. It was founded in 1963 by Heinz Ludwig Arnold who edited it until his death in 2011. Each publication of text+kritik covers the works of a German-speaking writer, which is presented and analyzed by other writers and experts in literary research and criticism.

== History ==
The first edition appeared in 1963 and was dedicated to Günter Grass. The founding editorial team consisted of Lothar Baier, Gerd Hemmerich, Jochen Meyer, Wolf Wondratschek and Heinz Ludwig Arnold.

In 2013 Text+Kritik celebrated its fiftieth anniversary with a special volume, Zukunft der Literatur (Future of Literature).

== Description ==
Each edition is focused on a different theme, which usually means it deals with one specific German-language writer. Featured writers included Theodor W. Adorno, Hannah Arendt, Arno Schmidt, Paul Celan, Daniel Kehlmann, Herta Müller, Yoko Tawada, Hubert Fichte, Emine Sevgi Özdamar, Friedrich Dürrenmatt, Felicitas Hoppe and Rainald Goetz.

The journal is published four times per year in Munich by edition text+kritik. Co-editors are Hugo Dittberner, Norbert Hummelt, Hermann Korte, Steffen Martus, Axel Ruckaberle, Michael Scheffel, Claudia Stockinger and Michael Töteberg.
