= Steffen Martus =

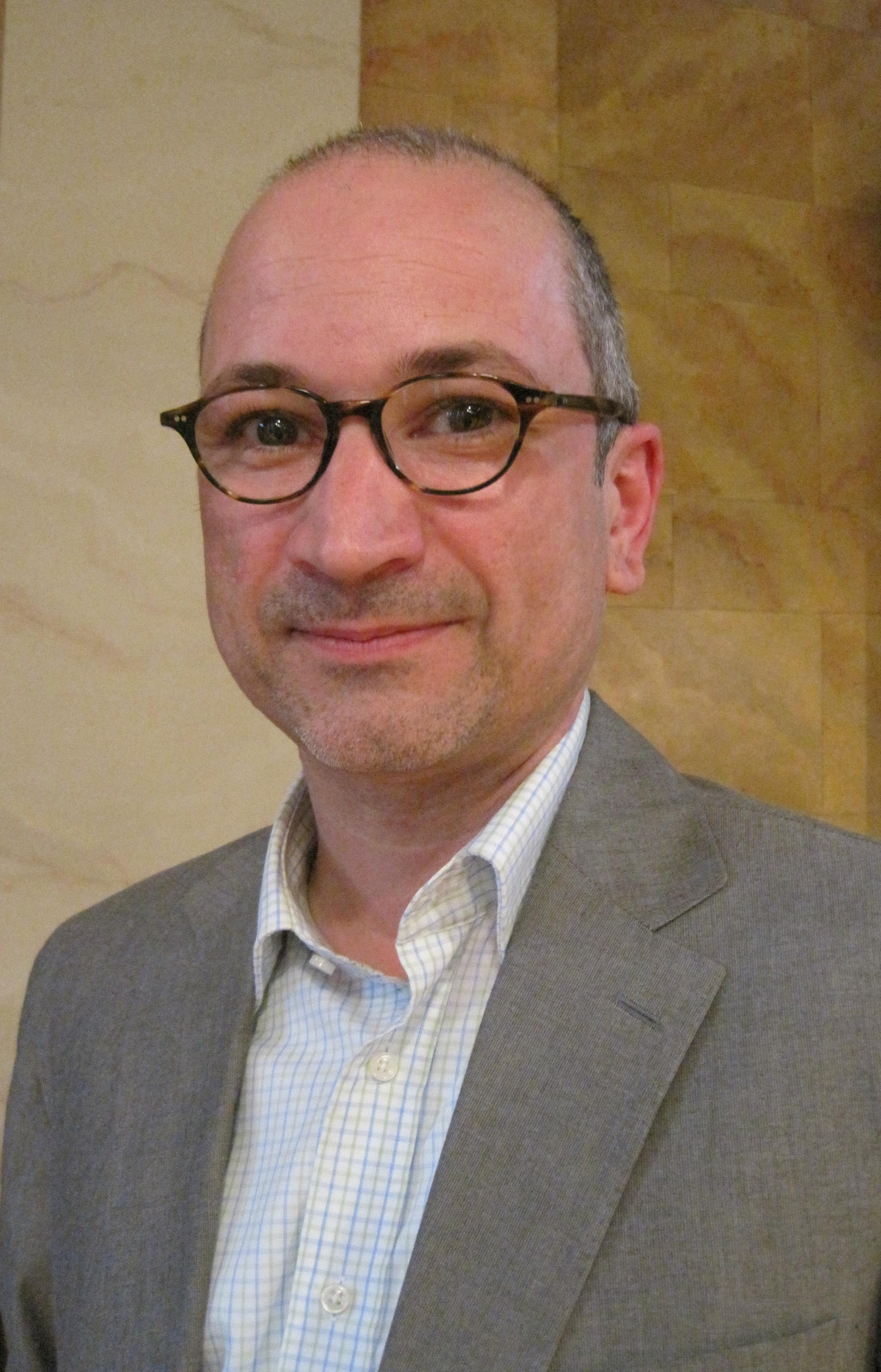
- Martus in 2013
- Born: 1968 (age 57–58); Karlsruhe, West Germany
- Occupations: Literary scholar and journalist Professor of Modern German Literature at Humboldt University of Berlin; Biographer

Steffen Martus (born Karlsruhe, 1968) is a German literary scholar and Professor of Modern German Literature at Humboldt University in Berlin.

== Life ==
Between 1989 and 1994 Steffen Martus studied German Philology (language, linguistics and literature), Social studies, Philosophy and Sociology at Ratisbon. In 1998 he obtained his doctorate from the Humboldt University in Berlin, where he stayed for post-doctoral studies. At the DFG Graduate school he worked on a "Codification of violence in the changing media" ("Codierung von Gewalt im medialen Wandel"), and was an academic researcher at the Institute for German Literature ("Institut für deutsche Literatur"). In 2002 he became Humboldt University's first Junior Professor for Modern German Literature, to be succeeded in 2006 by Andrea Polaschegg. In 2006 he was invited to accept a professorship for Modern German literature at the University of Erlangen-Nuremberg. In 2007 he succeeded Heinrich Detering as professor for Modern German literature at the University of Kiel.

Since 2010 he has occupied a newly created professorship for Modern German literature (eighteenth century to contemporary) at the Humboldt University in Berlin.

The focus of his academic scope embraces German literature from the seventeenth century till the present, the interactions between literature and science, questions of literary theory along with the praxeology of spiritual and cultural awarenesses.

Since 1997 Martus has been writing as a literary critic for Die Zeit, the Süddeutsche Zeitung and the Berliner Zeitung.

His biography of the Brothers Grimm appeared in 2009 and was nominated for the 2010 Leipzig Book Fair Prize in the "Non-fiction/essay" category. Steffen Martus is a co-producer of Humboldt University's Zeitschrift für Germanistik, a member of the editorial team on Text+Kritik and an (advisor-)member of the Humanities Network for German Literature and Philology.

== Recognition ==
- Humboldt Prize from Humboldt-University, Berlin 1999 for his doctoral thesis.

== Publications ==
=== Monographs ===
- Die Brüder Grimm. Eine Biographie. Berlin 2009. 2. und 3. Auflage 2010. ISBN 978-3-87134-568-5
- Werkpolitik. Zur Literaturgeschichte kritischer Kommunikation vom 17. bis ins 20. Jahrhundert mit Studien zu Klopstock, Tieck, Goethe und George. de Gruyter, Berlin 2007, ISBN 978-3-11-019271-1
- Ernst Jünger, Metzler, Stuttgart 2001 ISBN 3-476-10333-1
- Friedrich von Hagedorn – Konstellationen der Aufklärung, de Gruyter, Berlin 1999 ISBN 3-11-016623-2

=== Co-productions/ as editor ===
- Killy Literatur Lexikon. (Hrsg., mit WIlhelm Kühlmann u.A.) Autoren und Werke des deutschsprachigen Kulturraums (13 Vols., published by Walter de Gruyter, Berlin / New York 2008–11)
- Das Buch der Bücher – gelesen, (produced with Andrea Polaschegg), Lang, Bern 2006 ISBN 3-03910-839-5
- Die Kunst der Aufrichtigkeit im 17. Jahrhundert (produced with Claudia Benthien), Niemeyer, Tübingen 2006 ISBN 978-3-484-36614-5
- Lyrik im 19. Jahrhundert, (Hrsg. mit Stefan Scherer und Claudia Stockinger), Lang, Bern 2005 ISBN 3-03910-429-2
- Schlachtfelder. Zur Codierung von Gewalt im medialen Wandel (produced with Marina Münkler und Werner Röcke), Akademien Berlin 2003 ISBN 978-3-05-003587-1
