= Urs Widmer =

Swiss novelist, playwright (1938–2014)

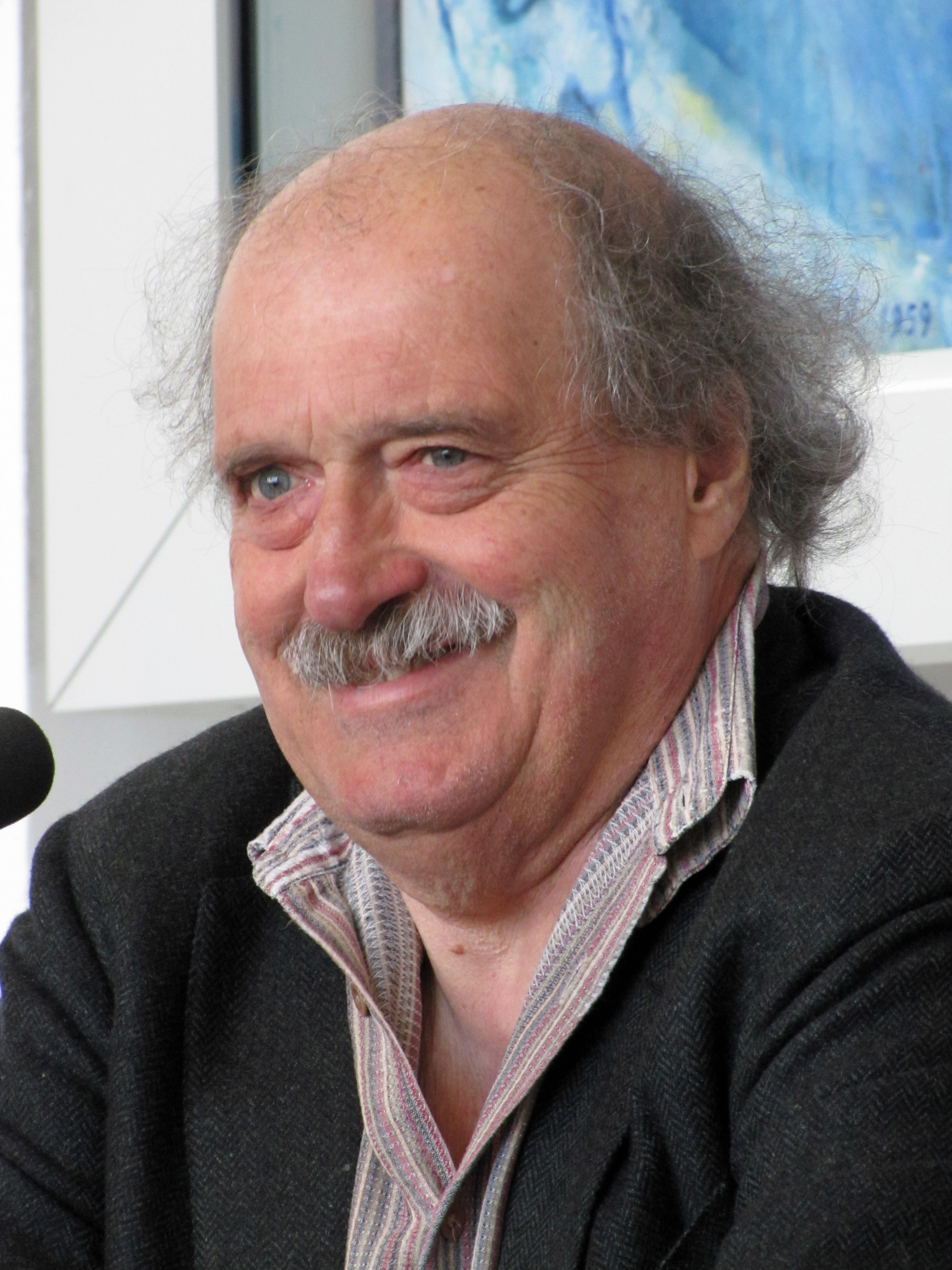
- Urs Widmer in April 2012
- Born: 21 May 1938; Basel, Switzerland
- Died: 2 April 2014 (aged 75)
- Occupations: Novelist, essayist, playwright
- Writing career
- Language: German
- Period: 1968–2013
- Notable awards: Hörspielpreis der Kriegsblinden (1976); Mülheimer Dramatikerpreis (1997); Schweizer Literaturpreise (2014)

Urs Widmer (21 May 1938 – 2 April 2014) was a Swiss novelist, playwright, an essayist, and a short story writer.

== Biography ==
Widmer was born in Basel in 1938, and for many years lived in Zurich. Widmer studied German, French, and history at the universities of Basel and Montpellier. After completing his PhD, he worked briefly as an editor at Suhrkamp Verlag, but left the publishing house during the Lektoren-Aufstand ("Editors' Revolt") of 1968.

In 2014, Roman Bucheli, Literary Editor of the Neue Zürcher Zeitung, said that Widmer:

"is without doubt one of the most significant and versatile talents currently at work in the field of contemporary German-language literature as well as one of the most successful. His sales are invariably in the high five-figure bracket"

== Works in English translation ==
- My mother's lover ("Der Geliebte meiner Mutter"). Tr. Donal McLaughlin, London, Seagull Books [2011], ISBN 978-1-906-49796-5.
- My father's book ("Das Buch des Vaters"). Tr. Donal McLaughlin, London, Seagull Books [2011], ISBN 978-0-857-42017-6.
- On life, death, and this and that of the rest. The Frankfurt lectures on poetics ("Vom Leben, vom Tod und vom Übrigen auch dies und das"). Tr. Donal McLaughlin, London, Seagull Books [2013], ISBN 978-0-857-42100-5.
- The blue soda siphon ("Der blaue Siphon"). Tr. Donal McLaughlin, London, Seagull Books [2014], ISBN 978-0-857-42211-8.
- In the Congo ("Im Kongo"). Tr. Donal McLaughlin, London, Seagull Books [2015], ISBN 978-0-857-42315-3.
- Mr Adamson ("Herr Adamson"). Tr. Donal McLaughlin, London, Seagull Books [2015], ISBN 978-0-857-42232-3.

== Awards and honors ==
- 1977 Hörspielpreis der Kriegsblinden, Fernsehabend
- 1992 Preis der SWR-Bestenliste
- 1997 Mülheimer Dramatikerpreis, Top Dogs
- 1998 Heimito von Doderer Prize
- 2001 Bertolt Brecht Literature Prize
- 2002 Großer Literaturpreis der Bayerischen Akademie der Schönen Künste
- 2013 Friedrich Hölderlin Prize
