= Nils Zumbeel =

German footballer

Personal information
- Date of birth: January 19, 1990 (age 36)
- Place of birth: Meppen, Germany
- Height: 1.92 m (6 ft 4 in)
- Position: Goalkeeper

Team information
- Current team: VfV 06 Hildesheim
- Number: 1

Youth career
- SV Meppen
- –2009: VfL Osnabrück

Senior career*
Years	Team	Apps	(Gls)
2009–2014	VfL Osnabrück II	95	(0)
2012–2014	VfL Osnabrück	8	(0)
2014–	VfV 06 Hildesheim	180	(0)
- * Club domestic league appearances and goals as of 14:55, 28 October 2020 (UTC)

Nils Zumbeel (born January 19, 1990) is a German footballer who plays for VfV 06 Hildesheim.
