= Nordradde =

River in Germany

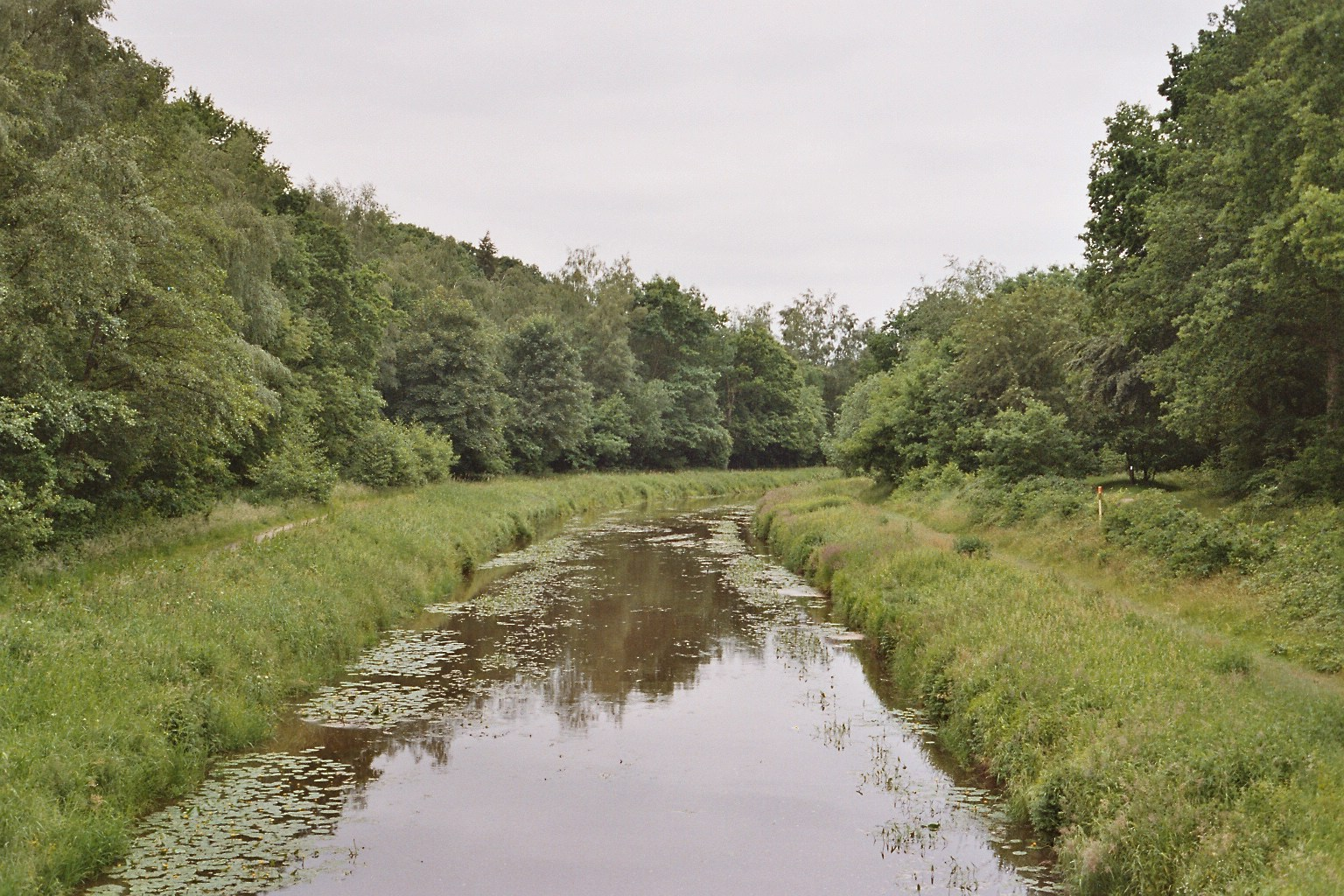

Location
- Country: Germany
- State: Lower Saxony

Physical characteristics
- Mouth
  - location: Ems
  - coordinates: 52.7109°N 7.2850°E
- Length: 37.9 km (23.5 mi)
- Basin size: 205 km^{2} (79 sq mi)

Basin features
- Progression: Ems→ North Sea

Nordradde (in its upper course Wehmer Graben) is a river of Lower Saxony, Germany. It flows into the Ems near Meppen.

== See also ==
- List of rivers of Lower Saxony
