= Ror Wolf =

German writer (1932–2020)

- Ror Wolf in 1988, receiving the Hörspielpreis der Kriegsblinden
- Born: Richard Georg Wolf; 29 June 1932; Saalfeld, Thuringia, Germany
- Died: 17 February 2020 (aged 87); Mainz, Rhineland-Palatine, Germany
- Other name: Raoul Tranchirer
- Education: University of Frankfurt; University of Hamburg
- Occupations: Writer; Poet; Artist
- Organizations: Hessischer Rundfunk; Schöffling & Co.
- Awards: Hörspielpreis der Kriegsblinden; Friedrich-Hölderlin-Preis; Schiller Memorial Prize; Rainer-Malkowski-Preis

Ror Wolf (born Richard Georg Wolf; 29 June 1932 – 17 February 2020) was a German writer, poet, and artist who also published under the pseudonym Raoul Tranchirer. He wrote audio plays, novels, and poems and made collages.

== Life ==
Richard Georg (Ror) Wolf was born in Saalfeld, Thuringia. He grew up without his father, who was drafted into the army when the boy was six and only returned ten years later. The child enjoyed his father's library, reading the books of Wilhelm Busch at an early age. Following World War II, the new government socialized the family's shoe shop, and his mother was imprisoned for one year. After his Abitur in 1951, he applied for a place to study at university but was not successful. He worked for two years in construction. After his application to university was rejected again, Wolf left the German Democratic Republic in July 1953 to live in West Germany. He first stayed in Stuttgart, making a living as an unskilled laborer. Later he studied literature, sociology and philosophy at the University of Frankfurt, with Theodor W. Adorno, Walter Höllerer and Max Horkheimer. Wolf soon published prose, poetry, reviews of literature, theatre and jazz as well as artistic collages in the student magazine Diskus. His name as an artist ("Ror") combines letters from his given names. His pseudonym ("Tranchirer") is his first name, Richard, spelled backward and turned into "Tranchirer," someone who "carves up [meat]." Cutting would become an important technique both in Wolf's literary and visual work. Wolf continued his studies at the University of Hamburg in 1958, and graduated from the University of Frankfurt in 1961.

Wolf worked as contributing editor of literature for the Hessischer Rundfunk, a public radio station, for two years. After 1963 he became a freelance writer and artist. His first novel, Fortsetzung des Berichts, was published by Suhrkamp in 1964. It shows influences of Franz Kafka, Samuel Beckett and Peter Weiss. His first radio play was broadcast in 1971. His radio collages often focus on soccer and keep being aired. The play Leben und Tod des Kornettisten Bix Beiderbecke aus Nord-Amerika, about the life and death of jazz cornetist Bix Beiderbecke, was awarded the prestigious Hörspielpreis der Kriegsblinden in 1988. The 2007 audio play Raoul Tranchirers Bemerkungen über die Stille -- R T's Comments on Silence received the award "Radio Play of the Year" from the German Academy of Performing Arts.

Wolf settled in Mainz where he lived for 30 years. He died there on 17 February 2020.

== Works ==
Wolf's texts often begin in simple everyday-life situations, changing abruptly to the grotesque in a combination of comical and horrible aspects. He worked last on an autobiography in the form of a collage. His works have been published by Schöffling & Co. The publisher plans a complete edition of his works, not only those already published, entitled Ror Wolf Werke (RWW):

- Vol. 1: Friedmar Apel (ed.): Im Zustand vergrößerter Ruhe. Die Gedichte. 2009.
- Vol. 2: Kai U. Jürgens (ed.): Prosa I: Fortsetzung des Berichts. 2010, ISBN 978-3-89561-921-2.
- Vol. 3: Kay Sokolowsky (ed.): Prosa II: Pilzer und Pelzer. 2010.
- Vol. 4: Jürgens (ed.): Prosa III: Die Gefährlichkeit der großen Ebene. 2012, ISBN 978-3-89561-922-9.
- Vol. 5: Jürgens (ed.): Prosa IV: Nachrichten aus der bewohnten Welt. 2014, ISBN 978-3-89561-924-3.
- Vol. 7: Hans Burkhard Schlichting (ed.): Die Einsamkeit des Meeresgrunds. Die Hörspiele. 2012, ISBN 978-3-89561-917-5.
- Vol. 9: Thomas Schröder (ed.): Raoul Tranchirers Enzyklopädie für unerschrockene Leser. Vol. II. 2009.

Volume 1 contains the poems, volumes 2 to 5 prose works, volume 7 the audio plays, and volume 9 Raoul Tranchirers Enzyklopädie für unerschrockene Leser, an encyclopedia for "intrepid readers".

== Translations ==
=== English ===
- Two Or Three Years Later: Forty-Nine Digressions (Open Letter Books, 2012), translated by Jennifer Marquart. ISBN 1934824704.
- "A Discovery Behind the House" (Asymptote, 2018), translated by Barbara Thimm.

=== French ===
- Le terrible festin (Gallimard, 1970), translated by Lily Jumel. ISBN 2070274330

=== Italian ===
- Tentativi di mantenere la calma (Mobydick, 2001), translated by Giovanni Nadiani. ISBN 88-8178-201-4

== Awards ==
Wolf was the recipient of numerous awards for his poetry, including the 2008 Friedrich-Hölderlin-Preis, the 2004 Kassel Literary Prize, the Georg-K.-Glaser-Preis of Rhineland-Palatine and the SWR, the Günter Eich Prize in Leipzig in 2015, the Schiller Memorial Prize from the Ministry of Culture in Baden-Württemberg in 2016, and the Rainer-Malkowski-Preis in 2018. The Schiller Memorial Prize's jury wrote in 2016:

For the fragmented present in which we live, Ror Wolf has developed literary forms like no other that have nothing to do with the comforting obligations of conventional storytelling.
