= Norbert Hummelt =

German poet, essayist and translator (born 1962)

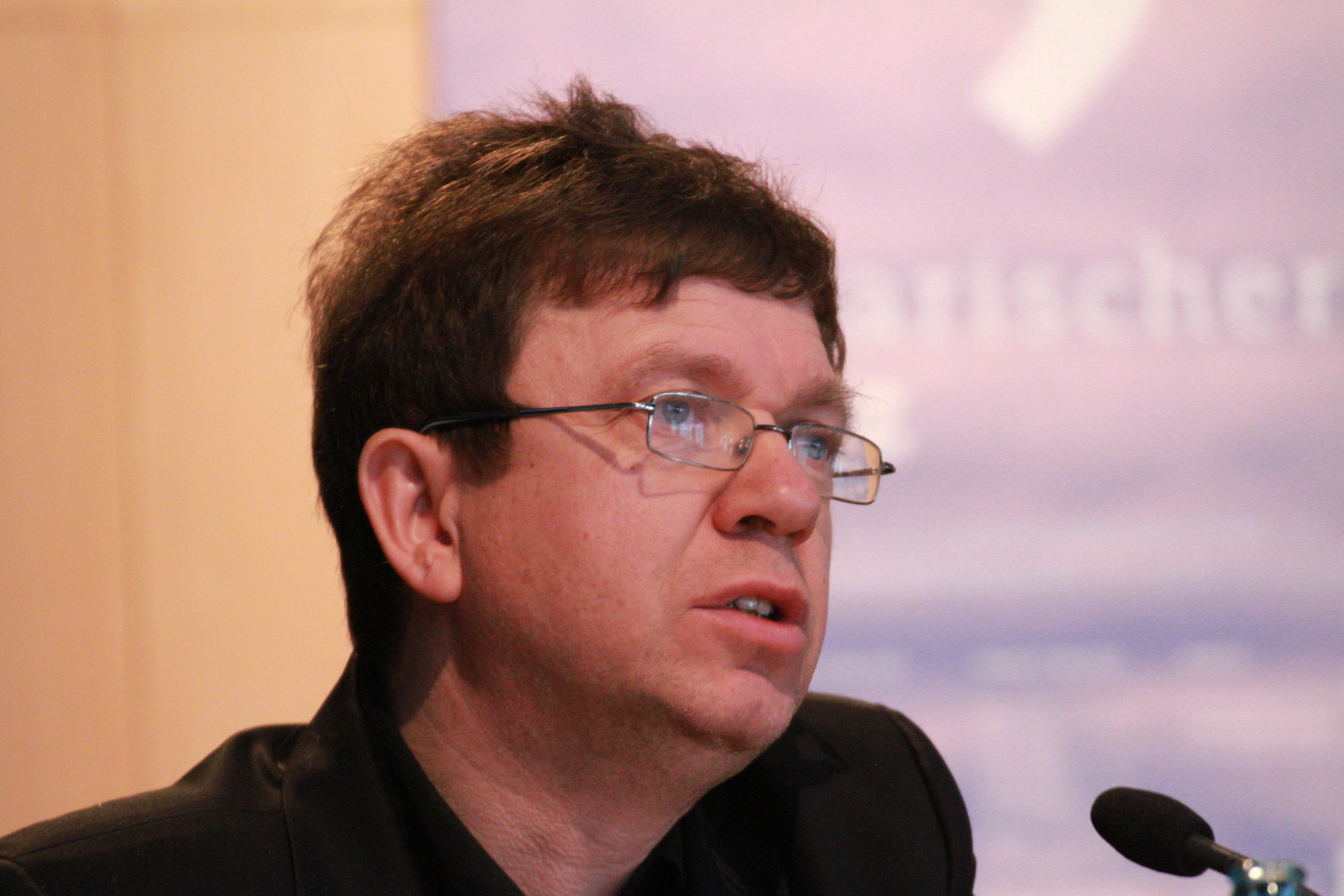
Norbert Hummelt as a member of the jury at the literary March 2015

Norbert Hummelt (born 30 December 1962 in Neuss) is a German poet, essayist and translator.

Hummelt studied German studies and English studies in Cologne until 1990. He worked together with Marcel Beyer and like him he started as a rather experimental writer, following Rolf Dieter Brinkmann and Thomas Kling. From 1988 to 1992 he was head of the Kölner Autorenwerkstatt; an authors group in Cologne. With his second collection of poems, singtrieb from 1997, he came closer to concepts of Romantic poetry.

Norbert Hummelt lived in the Bergisches Land near Cologne for several years. Since January 2006 he lives in Berlin. He taught and gave classes in creative writing at the Deutsches Literaturinstitut Leipzig and works for the Text+Kritik journal.

== Collections of poems ==
- knackige codes (crisp codes), Galrev 1993
- singtrieb (appetite for singing / sing instinct), Urs Engeler Editor 1997
- Zeichen im Schnee (signs in the snow), Luchterhand 2001
- Bildstock (picture stock), Kunstverein Hasselbach 2003
- Stille Quellen (silent fonts), Luchterhand 2004
- Totentanz (dance of the dead), Luchterhand 2007

== Translations ==
- Inger Christensen, Das Schmetterlingstal. Ein Requiem (from Danish, in: Schreibheft, no. 52, 1999)
- Four Quartets, T. S. Eliot (in: T. S. Eliot: Four Quartets ..., Rigodon, 2006).
- T. S. Eliot, Das öde Land, Suhrkamp : Frankfurt am Main 2008 ISBN 978-3-518-42022-5

== Selected essays ==
- out here in the dark, essay, in: Edit 38, 2005.
- Du hast dich durch Räume bewegt (you moved through spaces), about Lars Reyer's poems, in: Bella triste, no. 17, special edition for German contemporary poetry, Hildesheim 2007

== Editor ==
- William Butler Yeats – Die Gedichte (Luchterhand Literaturverlag 2005)
- Jahrbuch der Lyrik 2006 (with Christoph Buchwald, S. Fischer Verlag 2005)
- Lyrikedition 2000 (since 2005)

== Selected awards ==
- Förderpreis Literatur des Landes Nordrhein-Westfalen 1995
- Rolf-Dieter-Brinkmann-Stipendium of the city of Cologne 1996
- Mondseer Lyrikpreis 1998
- Hermann-Lenz-Stipendium 2000
- Fellow der Raketenstation Hombroich 2005
- Niederrheinischer Literaturpreis 2007
