= 2017–18 3. Liga =

10th season of the 3. Liga

3. Liga
- Season: 2017–18
- Dates: 21 July 2017 – 12 May 2018
- Champions: 1. FC Magdeburg
- Promoted: 1. FC Magdeburg; SC Paderborn
- Relegated: Werder Bremen II; Chemnitzer FC; Rot-Weiß Erfurt
- Matches: 380
- Goals: 1,038 (2.73 per match)
- Top goalscorer: Manuel Schäffler (22 goals)
- Biggest home win: Paderborn 7–1 Bremen II
- Biggest away win: Osnabrück 0−5 Paderborn
- Highest scoring: Halle 4−4 Paderborn; Paderborn 7–1 Bremen II; Wiesbaden 6–2 Münster; Rostock 5–3 Köln
- Attendance: 2,348,630 (6,181 per match)

The 2017–18 3. Liga was the tenth season of the 3. Liga. It began on 21 July 2017 and concluded on 12 May 2018.

The fixtures were announced on 4 July 2017.

== Teams ==
Locations of the 2017–18 3. Liga teams

=== Team changes ===
Promoted from 2016–17 Regionalliga	Relegated from 2016–17 2. Bundesliga	Promoted to 2017–18 2. Bundesliga	Relegated from 2016–17 3. Liga
Carl Zeiss Jena; SV Meppen; SpVgg Unterhaching	Karlsruher SC; Würzburger Kickers	MSV Duisburg; Holstein Kiel; Jahn Regensburg	FSV Frankfurt; Mainz 05 II

=== Stadiums and locations ===
Team	Location	Stadium	Capacity
VfR Aalen	Aalen	Scholz-Arena	14,500
Chemnitzer FC	Chemnitz	Stadion an der Gellertstraße	18,712
Rot-Weiß Erfurt	Erfurt	Steigerwaldstadion	18,611
SG Sonnenhof Großaspach	Aspach	Mechatronik Arena	10,000
Carl Zeiss Jena	Jena	Ernst-Abbe-Sportfeld	12,990
Hallescher FC	Halle	Erdgas Sportpark	15,057
Karlsruher SC	Karlsruhe	Wildparkstadion	29,699
Fortuna Köln	Cologne	Südstadion	14,800
Sportfreunde Lotte	Lotte	Sportpark am Lotter Kreuz	7,414
1. FC Magdeburg	Magdeburg	MDCC-Arena	27,500
SV Meppen	Meppen	Hänsch-Arena	16,500
Preußen Münster	Münster	Preußenstadion	15,050
VfL Osnabrück	Osnabrück	Stadion an der Bremer Brücke	16,667
SC Paderborn	Paderborn	Benteler Arena	15,000
Hansa Rostock	Rostock	Ostseestadion	29,000
SpVgg Unterhaching	Unterhaching	Alpenbauer Sportpark	15,053
SV Wehen Wiesbaden	Wiesbaden	BRITA-Arena	12,250
Werder Bremen II	Bremen	Weserstadion Platz 11	5,500
Würzburger Kickers	Würzburg	Flyeralarm Arena	14,500
FSV Zwickau	Zwickau	Stadion Zwickau	10,049

=== Personnel and kits ===
Team	Manager	Captain	Kit manufacturer	Shirt sponsor
VfR Aalen	(Germany) Peter Vollmann	(Germany) Marc Endres	Saller	Prowin
Chemnitzer FC	(Germany) David Bergner	(Germany) Kevin Conrad	adidas	Ahorn Hotels
Rot-Weiß Erfurt	(Germany) Stefan Emmerling	(Germany) Jens Möckel	Jako	Thüringer Energie AG
SG Sonnenhof Großaspach	(Germany) Sascha Hildmann	(Germany) Daniel Hägele	Hummel	Urbacher Mineralquellen
Hallescher FC	(Germany) Rico Schmitt	(United States) Royal-Dominique Fennell	Puma	Halplus
Carl Zeiss Jena	(Germany) Mark Zimmermann	(Germany) René Eckardt	Puma	Medipolis
Karlsruher SC	(Germany) Alois Schwartz	(Germany) Kai Bülow	Jako	Klaiber Markisen
Fortuna Köln	(Germany) Uwe Koschinat	(Germany) Hamdi Dahmani	Jako	HIT Handelsgruppe
Sportfreunde Lotte	(Germany) Andreas Golombek	(Germany) Tim Wendel	Puma	FRIMO Group
1. FC Magdeburg	(Germany) Jens Härtel	(Poland) Marius Sowislo	Uhlsport	FAM
SV Meppen	(Germany) Christian Neidhart	(Germany) Martin Wagner	Nike	KiK xxl
Preußen Münster	(Germany) Marco Antwerpen	(Germany) Adriano Grimaldi	Nike	Tuja Zeitarbeit
VfL Osnabrück	(Germany) Daniel Thioune	(Germany) Christian Groß	adidas	Sparkasse
SC Paderborn	(Germany) Steffen Baumgart	(Germany) Christian Strohdiek	Saller	Mediacom
Hansa Rostock	(Bulgaria) Pavel Dochev	(France) Amaury Bischoff	Nike	kurzurlaub.de
SpVgg Unterhaching	(Germany) Claus Schromm	(Germany) Ulrich Taffertshofer	adidas	Alpenbauer
SV Wehen Wiesbaden	(Germany) Rüdiger Rehm	(Poland) David Blacha	Nike	Brita
Werder Bremen II	(Germany) Sven Hübscher	(Poland) Rafael Kazior	Nike	Wiesenhof
Würzburger Kickers	(Germany) Michael Schiele	(Germany) Sebastian Neumann	Jako	s.Oliver
FSV Zwickau	(Germany) Torsten Ziegner	(Germany) Toni Wachsmuth	Puma	Zwickauer Energieversorgung

=== Managerial changes ===
Team	Outgoing manager	Manner of departure	Date of vacancy	Position in table	Incoming manager	Date of appointment
Chemnitzer FC	(Germany) Sven Köhler	Resigned	30 June 2017	Preseason	(Germany) Horst Steffen	1 July 2017
Hansa Rostock	(Germany) Uwe Ehlers	End of caretaker	30 June 2017	Preseason	(Bulgaria) Pavel Dochev	1 July 2017
Würzburger Kickers	(Germany) Bernd Hollerbach	Sacked	30 June 2017	Preseason	(Germany) Stephan Schmidt	1 July 2017
SG Sonnenhof Großaspach	(Germany) Oliver Zapel	Resigned	30 June 2017	Preseason	(Germany) Sascha Hildmann	1 July 2017
Sportfreunde Lotte	(Germany) Ismail Atalan	Signed by VfL Bochum	11 July 2017	Preseason	(Germany) Oscar Corrochano	14 July 2017
Sportfreunde Lotte	(Germany) Oscar Corrochano	Resigned	27 July 2017	18th	(Germany) Marc Fascher	27 July 2017
Karlsruher SC	(Germany) Marc-Patrick Meister	Sacked	20 August 2017	15th	(Germany) Christian Eichner (Bosnia and Herzegovina) Zlatan Bajramović (joint caretakers)	20 August 2017
Karlsruher SC	(Germany) Christian Eichner (Bosnia and Herzegovina) Zlatan Bajramović	End of tenure as caretakers	29 August 2017	16th	(Germany) Alois Schwartz	29 August 2017
Rot-Weiß Erfurt	(Germany) Stefan Krämer	Sacked	2 October 2017	20th	(Germany) David Bergner	2 October 2017
Würzburger Kickers	(Germany) Stephan Schmidt	Sacked	2 October 2017	17th	(Germany) Michael Schiele	2 October 2017
VfL Osnabrück	(United States) Joe Enochs	Sacked	4 October 2017	19th	(Germany) Daniel Thioune	5 October 2017
Werder Bremen II	(Germany) Florian Kohfeldt	Promoted to Werder Bremen	30 October 2017	16th	(Germany) Oliver Zapel	13 November 2017
Sportfreunde Lotte	(Germany) Marc Fascher	Sacked	1 November 2017	16th	(Germany) Andreas Golombek	1 November 2017
Rot-Weiß Erfurt	(Germany) David Bergner	Sacked	20 November 2017	20th	(Germany) Stefan Emmerling	20 November 2017
Preußen Münster	(Germany) Benno Möhlmann	Sacked	10 December 2017	16th	(Germany) Marco Antwerpen	12 December 2017
Chemnitzer FC	(Germany) Horst Steffen	Sacked	2 January 2018	19th	(Serbia) Sreto Ristić (interim)	2 January 2018
Chemnitzer FC	(Serbia) Sreto Ristić	End of caretaker tenure	6 January 2018	19th	(Germany) David Bergner	6 January 2018
Werder Bremen II	(Germany) Oliver Zapel	Sacked	5 February 2018	19th	(Germany) Sven Hübscher	5 February 2018
FSV Zwickau	(Germany) Torsten Ziegner	Sacked	25 April 2018	16th	(Germany) Danny König (interim)	25 April 2018

== League table ==
Pos	Team	Pld	W	D	L	GF	GA	GD	Pts	Promotion, qualification or relegation
1	1. FC Magdeburg (C, P)	38	27	4	7	70	32	+38	85	Promotion to 2. Bundesliga and qualification for DFB-Pokal
2	SC Paderborn (P)	38	25	8	5	90	33	+57	83	Promotion to 2. Bundesliga and qualification for DFB-Pokal
3	Karlsruher SC	38	19	12	7	49	29	+20	69	Qualification for promotion play-offs and DFB-Pokal
4	Wehen Wiesbaden	38	21	5	12	76	39	+37	68	Qualification for DFB-Pokal
5	Würzburger Kickers	38	17	10	11	53	46	+7	61	
6	Hansa Rostock	38	16	12	10	48	34	+14	60	
7	SV Meppen	38	15	13	10	50	47	+3	58	
8	Fortuna Köln	38	15	9	14	53	48	+5	54	
9	SpVgg Unterhaching	38	16	6	16	54	55	−1	54	
10	Preußen Münster	38	14	10	14	50	49	+1	52	
11	Carl Zeiss Jena	38	14	10	14	49	59	−10	52	
12	VfR Aalen	38	13	11	14	48	57	−9	50	
13	Hallescher FC	38	13	10	15	52	54	−2	49	
14	Sonnenhof Großaspach	38	12	11	15	55	60	−5	47	
15	FSV Zwickau	38	10	11	17	38	55	−17	41	
16	Sportfreunde Lotte	38	11	7	20	43	60	−17	40	
17	VfL Osnabrück	38	8	13	17	47	67	−20	37	
18	Werder Bremen II (Note: Reserve teams are ineligible for promotion or DFB-Pokal qualification.) (R)	38	6	13	19	39	62	−23	31	Relegation to Regionalliga
19	Chemnitzer FC (Note: On 23 April 2018, Chemnitzer FC was deducted nine points after filing for insolvency, where Chemnitz did not appeal against.) (R)	38	8	7	23	48	74	−26	22	Relegation to Regionalliga
20	Rot-Weiß Erfurt (Note: On 13 February 2018, Rot-Weiß Erfurt was deducted one point, which Erfurt appealed. It was denied on 23 February 2018 and confirmed on 13 March 2018. Another nine points were deducted, on 29 March 2018, after Erfurt filed for insolvency. It was made official on 6 April 2018 after Erfurt did not appeal against it.) (R)	38	5	8	25	26	78	−52	13	Relegation to Regionalliga

Source: DFB
Rules for classification: 1) Points; 2) Goal difference; 3) Goals scored
(C) Champions; (P) Promoted; (R) Relegated

== Results ==
Home \ Away	AAL	BR2	CHE	ERF	GRO	HAL	JEN	KAR	KÖL	LOT	MAG	MEP	MÜN	OSN	PAD	ROS	UNT	WIE	WÜR	ZWI
VfR Aalen	—	1–0	3–2	1–1	4–1	2–1	3–1	0–2	1–1	3–0	0–1	1–1	0–0	2–1	0–5	1–0	3–1	1–0	2–3	2–2
Werder Bremen II	1–0	—	1–1	0–0	0–5	1–2	2–4	2–0	1–2	1–1	1–3	2–1	2–4	2–2	0–2	1–1	3–0	0–0	0–1	0–0
Chemnitzer FC	2–4	2–1	—	1–0	2–3	1–1	1–0	0–0	1–2	3–1	2–3	1–2	1–2	0–0	0–2	1–1	2–1	1–4	0–3	1–0
Rot-Weiß Erfurt	0–1	0–3	0–5	—	0–6	1–1	1–0	1–3	2–1	2–3	3–1	0–0	1–1	4–4	0–1	0–1	0–2	1–3	1–3	0–3
Sonnenhof Großaspach	0–0	2–2	3–1	1–0	—	0–3	0–0	1–0	1–3	1–1	4–1	2–3	2–2	0–1	1–1	0–0	1–2	1–3	1–3	2–0
Hallescher FC	3–2	1–0	0–3	3–0	3–0	—	0–2	0–1	0–3	1–0	0–2	2–0	3–0	1–0	4–4	0–2	1–2	2–1	1–3	2–0
Carl Zeiss Jena	3–2	2–1	1–1	1–0	0–0	2–1	—	0–0	0–2	2–2	1–5	2–2	2–0	0–0	3–1	1–0	2–1	4–3	1–2	2–1
Karlsruher SC	0–0	1–0	2–0	2–0	3–1	1–1	2–3	—	1–0	1–0	1–0	2–0	3–0	2–2	0–0	0–0	3–1	2–1	2–0	1–0
Fortuna Köln	1–0	2–1	3–0	2–0	1–3	1–1	1–0	4–0	—	0–3	1–2	0–2	2–4	3–0	2–4	0–0	0–0	1–0	2–1	1–1
Sportfreunde Lotte	2–0	3–2	3–1	1–0	0–2	2–1	4–0	1–1	0–2	—	0–1	2–2	0–0	2–3	1–2	0–2	2–1	0–1	1–3	1–0
1. FC Magdeburg	6–1	4–1	4–1	3–0	3–0	2–1	2–0	2–0	2–0	2–0	—	0–0	3–1	2–0	1–0	2–0	0–3	0–0	2–1	2–2
SV Meppen	1–1	2–2	3–2	3–0	1–1	2–2	2–1	2–0	1–0	2–1	1–2	—	2–0	1–0	0–0	0–2	1–1	1–3	2–2	4–0
Preußen Münster	1–1	0–1	1–0	5–0	1–4	1–2	2–2	1–1	1–1	3–0	0–1	3–0	—	4–1	1–1	2–0	2–0	1–0	1–0	0–2
VfL Osnabrück	4–1	1–1	6–1	0–1	2–1	3–3	1–2	0–0	2–2	1–0	0–2	2–2	0–1	—	0–5	1–1	2–0	0–4	1–1	4–0
SC Paderborn	3–0	7–1	3–2	0–1	5–0	0–0	6–0	0–2	3–1	5–0	1–1	1–0	2–1	3–0	—	2–1	3–0	3–1	0–0	2–0
Hansa Rostock	1–0	0–0	3–1	3–1	0–0	4–2	0–0	0–3	5–3	0–3	1–0	1–2	1–1	2–0	2–3	—	1–1	2–0	3–1	1–1
SpVgg Unterhaching	0–1	1–0	4–2	1–1	1–4	1–1	3–2	3–2	2–2	3–0	0–1	4–0	1–0	4–1	0–3	0–3	—	0–1	3–2	2–1
Wehen Wiesbaden	2–0	2–2	2–1	4–2	5–0	3–1	1–0	1–1	1–1	3–1	1–2	0–1	6–2	5–1	4–1	0–1	1–0	—	0–2	3–0
Würzburger Kickers	2–2	1–1	0–0	4–1	1–1	1–0	2–2	0–0	1–0	2–1	1–0	2–0	0–1	1–0	2–3	0–3	0–2	0–5	—	1–1
FSV Zwickau	2–2	1–0	3–2	1–1	2–0	1–1	2–1	2–4	1–0	1–1	3–1	0–1	1–0	1–1	1–3	1–0	1–3	0–2	0–1	—

Source: DFB
Legend: Blue = home team win; Yellow = draw; Red = away team win.

== Top goalscorers ==
Rank	Player	Club	Goals
1	(Germany) Manuel Schäffler	Wehen Wiesbaden	22
2	(Germany) Benjamin Girth	SV Meppen	19
2	(Germany) Stephan Hain	SpVgg Unterhaching	19
2	(Germany) Sven Michel	SC Paderborn	19
5	(Germany) Fabian Schleusener	Karlsruher SC	17
5	(Germany) Philip Türpitz	1. FC Magdeburg	17
7	(Switzerland) Stephan Andrist	Wehen Wiesbaden	15
7	(Germany) Adriano Grimaldi	Preußen Münster	15
7	(Germany) Daniel Keita-Ruel	Fortuna Köln	15
10	(Germany) Christian Beck	1. FC Magdeburg	13
10	(Germany) Daniel Frahn	Chemnitzer FC	13
10	(Poland) Matthias Morys	VfR Aalen	13

== Number of teams by state ==
Position	State	Number of teams	Teams
1	North Rhine-Westphalia	4	Fortuna Köln, Sportfreunde Lotte, Preußen Münster and SC Paderborn
2	Baden-Württemberg	3	VfR Aalen, SG Sonnenhof Großaspach and Karlsruher SC
3	Bavaria	2	SpVgg Unterhaching and Würzburger Kickers
3	Lower Saxony	2	SV Meppen and VfL Osnabrück
3	Saxony	2	Chemnitzer FC and FSV Zwickau
3	Saxony-Anhalt	2	Hallescher FC and 1. FC Magdeburg
3	Thuringia	2	Rot-Weiß Erfurt and Carl Zeiss Jena
8	Bremen	1	Werder Bremen II
8	Hesse	1	Wehen Wiesbaden
8	Mecklenburg-Vorpommern	1	Hansa Rostock
