= 2019–20 3. Liga =

12th season of the 3. Liga

3. Liga
- Season: 2019–20
- Dates: 19 July 2019 – 4 July 2020
- Champions: Bayern Munich II
- Promoted: Würzburger Kickers; Eintracht Braunschweig
- Relegated: Chemnitzer FC; Preußen Münster; Sonnenhof Großaspach; Carl Zeiss Jena
- Matches: 380
- Goals: 1,137 (2.99 per match)
- Top goalscorer: Kwasi Okyere Wriedt (24 goals)
- Biggest home win: Meppen 6–1 Kaiserslautern; Bayern Munich II 6–1 Halle
- Biggest away win: Großaspach 0–6 Würzburg
- Highest scoring: Unterhaching 5–4 Würzburg
- Longest winning run: 5 games Duisburg; Kaiserslautern
- Longest unbeaten run: 16 games 1860 Munich
- Longest winless run: 13 games Jena; Halle
- Longest losing run: 6 games Jena; Halle
- Highest attendance: 36,766; Kaiserslautern v Mannheim
- Lowest attendance: 2,164; Bayern Munich II v Uerdingen
- Attendance: 2,350,190 (6,185 per match)

The 2019–20 3. Liga was the twelfth season of the 3. Liga. It started on 19 July 2019 and concluded on 4 July 2020. Bayern Munich II won the league title on the final day of the season to become the first reserve team to win the 3. Liga.

== Effects of the COVID-19 pandemic ==
Due to the COVID-19 pandemic in Germany, the matchdays 28 and 29 were postponed and will be rescheduled. On 16 March, the DFB announced that the league would be suspended until 30 April. On 27 April, the league was suspended further but with intention to return. A decision on the resumption of the competition, similar to the Bundesliga and 2. Bundesliga, took place at an extraordinary meeting of the DFB-Bundestag on 25 May 2020. On 15 May, after the DFB said earlier that 26 May would be the start date to resume, the date was moved back as not all teams can train again regularly. The intention still was to finish the season, with games maybe even after 30 June. On 21 May, the DFB announced that the season will be continued on 30 May. That was confirmed on 25 May. On 29 May, after a meeting of all clubs, five substitutions will be permitted, which has been temporarily allowed by IFAB following a proposal by FIFA to lessen the impact of fixture congestion.

== Teams ==
Locations of the 2019–20 3. Liga teams

=== Team changes ===
Promoted from 2018–19 Regionalliga	Relegated from 2018–19 2. Bundesliga	Promoted to 2019–20 2. Bundesliga	Relegated from 2018–19 3. Liga
Chemnitzer FC; Viktoria Köln; Waldhof Mannheim; Bayern Munich II	FC Ingolstadt; 1. FC Magdeburg; MSV Duisburg	VfL Osnabrück; Karlsruher SC; Wehen Wiesbaden	Energie Cottbus; Sportfreunde Lotte; Fortuna Köln; VfR Aalen

=== Stadiums and locations ===
Team	Location	Stadium	Capacity
Eintracht Braunschweig	Braunschweig	Eintracht-Stadion	23,325
Chemnitzer FC	Chemnitz	Stadion an der Gellertstraße	18,712
MSV Duisburg	Duisburg	Schauinsland-Reisen-Arena	31,500
SG Sonnenhof Großaspach	Aspach	Mechatronik Arena	10,000
Hallescher FC	Halle	Erdgas Sportpark	15,057
FC Ingolstadt	Ingolstadt	Audi Sportpark	15,000
Carl Zeiss Jena	Jena	Ernst-Abbe-Sportfeld	12,990
1. FC Kaiserslautern	Kaiserslautern	Fritz-Walter-Stadion	49,780
Viktoria Köln	Cologne	Sportpark Höhenberg	10,001
1. FC Magdeburg	Magdeburg	MDCC-Arena	27,500
Waldhof Mannheim	Mannheim	Carl-Benz-Stadion	25,667
SV Meppen	Meppen	Hänsch-Arena	16,500
1860 Munich	Munich	Grünwalder Stadion	15,000
Bayern Munich II	Munich	Grünwalder Stadion	15,000
Preußen Münster	Münster	Preußenstadion	15,050
Hansa Rostock	Rostock	Ostseestadion	29,000
KFC Uerdingen	Düsseldorf	Merkur Spiel-Arena	54,600
SpVgg Unterhaching	Unterhaching	Sportpark Unterhaching	15,053
Würzburger Kickers	Würzburg	Flyeralarm Arena	14,500
FSV Zwickau	Zwickau	GGZ-Arena Zwickau	10,049

=== Personnel and kits ===
Team	Manager	Captain	Kit manufacturer	Shirt sponsor
Eintracht Braunschweig	(Germany) Marco Antwerpen	(Germany) Stephan Fürstner	Erima	SEAT
Chemnitzer FC	(Germany) Patrick Glöckner	(Austria) Niklas Hoheneder	Jako	NSH-Gruppe
MSV Duisburg	(Germany) Torsten Lieberknecht	(Germany) Moritz Stoppelkamp	Capelli	XTiP
Sonnenhof Großaspach	(Germany) Hans-Jürgen Boysen	(Germany) Julian Leist	Nike	Sanwald
Hallescher FC	(Germany) Florian Schnorrenberg	(Germany) Jan Washausen	Puma	sunmaker
FC Ingolstadt	(Germany) Tomas Oral	(Germany) Stefan Kutschke	Puma	PROSIS
Carl Zeiss Jena	(Germany) René Klingbeil	(Germany) René Eckardt	Puma	sunmaker
1. FC Kaiserslautern	(Germany) Boris Schommers	(Germany) Christoph Hemlein	Nike	Layenberger
Viktoria Köln	(Bulgaria) Pavel Dochev	(Germany) Mike Wunderlich	Puma	ETL
1. FC Magdeburg	(Germany) Thomas Hoßmang	(Germany) Christian Beck	Uhlsport	sunmaker
Waldhof Mannheim	(Germany) Bernhard Trares	(Germany) Kevin Conrad	Capelli	sunmaker
SV Meppen	(Germany) Christian Neidhart	(Germany) Thilo Leugers	Nike	KiK xxl
1860 Munich	(Germany) Michael Köllner	(Germany) Felix Weber	Macron	Die Bayerische
Bayern Munich II	(Germany) Sebastian Hoeneß	(Germany) Nicolas Feldhahn	Adidas	Magenta Sport
Preußen Münster	(Germany) Sascha Hildmann	(Germany) Julian Schauerte	Jako	sunmaker
Hansa Rostock	(Germany) Jens Härtel	(Germany) Julian Riedel	Nike	sunmaker
KFC Uerdingen	(Germany) Stefan Krämer	(Germany) Jan Kirchhoff	Capelli	SWK
SpVgg Unterhaching	(Germany) Claus Schromm	(Germany) Josef Welzmüller	Adidas	frostkrone
Würzburger Kickers	(Germany) Michael Schiele	(Germany) Sebastian Schuppan	Jako	BVUK
FSV Zwickau	(United States) Joe Enochs	(Germany) Johannes Brinkies	Puma	sunmaker

=== Managerial changes ===
Team	Outgoing	Manner	Exit date		Position in table	Incoming	Incoming date		Ref.
Team	Outgoing	Manner	Announced on	Departed on	Position in table	Incoming	Announced on	Arrived on	Ref.
Preußen Münster	(Germany) Marco Antwerpen	Resigned	29 January 2019	30 June 2019	Pre-season	(Germany) Sven Hübscher	20 March 2019	1 July 2019	
Sonnenhof Großaspach	(Germany) Markus Lang	End of caretaker spell	6 May 2019	30 June 2019	Pre-season	(Germany) Oliver Zapel	4 June 2019	1 July 2019	
1. FC Magdeburg	(Germany) Michael Oenning	End of contract	16 May 2019	30 June 2019	Pre-season	(Germany) Stefan Krämer	21 May 2019	1 July 2019	
Viktoria Köln	(Germany) Jürgen Kohler	End of caretaker spell	22 May 2019	30 June 2019	Pre-season	(Bulgaria) Pavel Dochev	22 May 2019	1 July 2019	
FC Ingolstadt	(Germany) Tomas Oral	Resigned	30 May 2019	30 June 2019	Pre-season	(Luxembourg) Jeff Saibene	12 June 2019	1 July 2019	
Bayern Munich II	(Germany) Holger Seitz	Became head of academy	3 June 2019	30 June 2019	Pre-season	(Germany) Sebastian Hoeneß	3 June 2019	1 July 2019	
Eintracht Braunschweig	(Germany) André Schubert	Signed by Holstein Kiel	16 June 2019	30 June 2019	Pre-season	(Germany) Christian Flüthmann	17 June 2019	1 July 2019	
Chemnitzer FC	(Germany) David Bergner	Sacked	4 September 2019		19th	(Germany) Sreto Ristić (interim)	4 September 2019		
1. FC Kaiserslautern	(Germany) Sascha Hildmann	Sacked	16 September 2019		14th	(Germany) Boris Schommers	19 September 2019		
Chemnitzer FC	(Germany) Sreto Ristić (interim)	End of caretaker spell	22 September 2019		19th	(Germany) Patrick Glöckner	22 September 2019		
KFC Uerdingen	(Germany) Heiko Vogel	Sacked	25 September 2019		17th	(Germany) Stefan Reisinger (interim)	25 September 2019		
Carl Zeiss Jena	(Poland) Lukas Kwasniok	Sacked	28 September 2019		20th	(Germany) Christian Fröhlich (interim)	4 October 2019		
Carl Zeiss Jena	(Germany) Christian Fröhlich (interim)	End of caretaker spell	8 October 2019		20th	(Germany) Rico Schmitt	8 October 2019		
KFC Uerdingen	(Germany) Stefan Reisinger (interim)	End of caretaker spell	16 October 2019		16th	(Germany) Daniel Steuernagel	16 October 2019		
1860 Munich	(Germany) Daniel Bierofka	Resigned	7 November 2019		15th	(Germany) Oliver Beer (interim)	7 November 2019		
1860 Munich	(Germany) Oliver Beer (interim)	End of caretaker spell	9 November 2019		15th	(Germany) Michael Köllner (interim)	9 November 2019		
Eintracht Braunschweig	(Germany) Christian Flüthmann	Sacked	17 November 2019		5th	(Germany) Marco Antwerpen	18 November 2019		
Sonnenhof Großaspach	(Germany) Oliver Zapel	Sacked	16 December 2019		19th	(Germany) Markus Lang (interim)	16 December 2019		
1. FC Magdeburg	(Germany) Stefan Krämer	Sacked	22 December 2019		12th	(Germany) Claus-Dieter Wollitz	23 December 2019		
Preußen Münster	(Germany) Sven Hübscher	Sacked	1 December 2019		19th	(Germany) Arne Barez (interim)	1 December 2019		
Preußen Münster	(Germany) Arne Barez (interim)	End of caretaker spell	27 December 2019		19th	(Germany) Sascha Hildmann	27 December 2019		
Sonnenhof Großaspach	(Germany) Markus Lang (interim)	End of caretaker spell	3 January 2020		19th	(Germany) Mike Sadlo/Heiner Backhaus	3 January 2020		
Carl Zeiss Jena	(Germany) Rico Schmitt	Sacked	5 February 2020		20th	(Germany) René Klingbeil (interim)	7 February 2020		
Sonnenhof Großaspach	(Germany) Mike Sadlo/Heiner Backhaus	Sacked	12 February 2020		19th	(Germany) Markus Lang (interim)	12 February 2020		
Hallescher FC	(Germany) Torsten Ziegner	Sacked	24 February 2020		13th	(Germany) Ismail Atalan	25 February 2020		
Sonnenhof Großaspach	(Germany) Markus Lang (interim)	End of caretaker spell	26 February 2020		19th	(Germany) Hans-Jürgen Boysen	26 February 2020		
FC Ingolstadt	(Luxembourg) Jeff Saibene	Sacked	9 March 2020		5th	(Germany) Tomas Oral	11 March 2020		
KFC Uerdingen	(Germany) Daniel Steuernagel	Mutual consent	10 March 2020		11th	(Germany) Stefan Krämer	10 March 2020		
Hallescher FC	(Germany) Ismail Atalan	Sacked	8 June 2020		17th	(Germany) Florian Schnorrenberg	8 June 2020		
1. FC Magdeburg	(Germany) Claus-Dieter Wollitz	Sacked	10 June 2020		14th	(Germany) Thomas Hoßmang	10 June 2020		

== League table ==
Pos	Team	Pld	W	D	L	GF	GA	GD	Pts	Promotion, qualification or relegation
1	Bayern Munich II (Note: Reserve teams are ineligible for promotion or DFB-Pokal qualification.) (C)	38	19	8	11	76	60	+16	65	
2	Würzburger Kickers (P)	38	19	7	12	71	60	+11	64	Promotion to 2. Bundesliga and qualification for DFB-Pokal
3	Eintracht Braunschweig (P)	38	18	10	10	64	53	+11	64	Promotion to 2. Bundesliga and qualification for DFB-Pokal
4	FC Ingolstadt	38	17	12	9	61	40	+21	63	Qualification for promotion play-offs and DFB-Pokal
5	MSV Duisburg	38	17	11	10	68	48	+20	62	Qualification for DFB-Pokal
6	Hansa Rostock	38	17	8	13	54	43	+11	59	
7	SV Meppen	38	16	10	12	69	57	+12	58	
8	1860 Munich	38	16	10	12	63	54	+9	58	
9	Waldhof Mannheim	38	13	17	8	52	47	+5	56	
10	1. FC Kaiserslautern	38	14	13	11	59	54	+5	55	
11	SpVgg Unterhaching	38	12	15	11	50	53	−3	51	
12	Viktoria Köln	38	14	9	15	65	71	−6	51	
13	KFC Uerdingen	38	12	12	14	40	54	−14	48	
14	1. FC Magdeburg	38	10	17	11	49	42	+7	47	
15	Hallescher FC	38	12	10	16	64	66	−2	46	
16	FSV Zwickau	38	11	11	16	56	61	−5	44	
17	Chemnitzer FC (R)	38	11	11	16	54	60	−6	44	Relegation to Regionalliga
18	Preußen Münster (R)	38	9	13	16	49	62	−13	40	Relegation to Regionalliga
19	Sonnenhof Großaspach (R)	38	8	8	22	33	67	−34	32	Relegation to Regionalliga
20	Carl Zeiss Jena (R)	38	5	8	25	40	85	−45	23	Relegation to Regionalliga

Source: DFB
Rules for classification: 1) Points; 2) Goal difference; 3) Goals scored; 4) Head-to-head results; 5) Head-to-head away goals scored; 6) Away goals scored; 7) Play-off.
(C) Champions; (P) Promoted; (R) Relegated

== Results ==
Home \ Away	BRA	CHE	DUI	GRO	HAL	ING	JEN	KAI	KÖL	MAG	MAN	MEP	MUN	MU2	MÜN	ROS	UER	UNT	WÜR	ZWI
Eintracht Braunschweig	—	2–1	0–3	2–1	1–1	0–3	1–1	2–0	3–1	2–2	3–2	1–2	2–1	1–1	1–0	1–2	4–1	0–0	5–2	3–1
Chemnitzer FC	1–2	—	3–1	0–1	3–0	0–1	3–2	3–1	2–2	0–0	1–1	2–4	0–1	1–0	1–0	4–2	1–1	1–0	0–0	2–2
MSV Duisburg	1–1	2–1	—	4–1	2–2	1–1	1–1	3–1	2–1	1–0	2–3	1–3	2–1	3–2	2–0	0–0	2–0	4–0	1–1	3–1
Sonnenhof Großaspach	1–3	2–0	1–1	—	1–0	1–5	1–2	1–3	0–3	1–2	0–3	1–2	2–4	2–2	0–0	0–1	2–2	0–2	0–6	1–0
Hallescher FC	0–1	3–1	1–0	4–0	—	1–1	5–3	1–1	3–4	1–1	3–0	3–3	0–1	1–2	2–2	1–0	1–1	3–5	2–5	1–1
FC Ingolstadt	0–0	1–1	3–2	1–1	2–3	—	5–1	2–1	0–1	0–2	2–0	1–1	2–2	1–2	3–2	2–2	0–1	0–0	3–0	4–2
Carl Zeiss Jena	0–2	0–1	1–2	1–0	0–3	1–2	—	1–2	2–3	1–1	1–2	0–2	0–3	1–2	1–2	3–1	0–0	0–3	1–1	2–1
1. FC Kaiserslautern	0–3	2–0	1–3	0–0	1–0	0–0	3–1	—	3–0	1–1	1–1	3–3	1–1	1–0	1–1	2–0	4–0	1–1	2–3	0–0
Viktoria Köln	0–0	3–2	1–0	1–0	0–2	3–0	2–2	2–4	—	1–1	2–2	1–3	2–0	2–4	2–1	1–5	0–1	0–2	5–1	3–0
1. FC Magdeburg	2–4	1–1	1–1	0–1	1–0	0–2	6–2	0–1	2–0	—	1–1	0–2	5–2	2–2	2–2	0–1	1–1	3–0	3–0	1–2
Waldhof Mannheim	0–0	4–3	4–3	3–2	0–4	0–0	1–1	1–1	2–1	1–1	—	0–0	4–0	2–3	0–0	1–1	1–2	0–3	1–2	0–0
SV Meppen	4–3	1–2	1–0	2–1	2–3	0–2	3–0	6–1	1–1	1–3	0–1	—	1–1	5–3	3–1	0–3	1–2	3–0	1–3	0–2
1860 Munich	4–1	4–3	3–2	1–1	2–1	0–2	3–1	3–1	4–2	1–1	1–1	0–0	—	1–1	1–1	0–1	0–1	3–0	1–2	3–0
Bayern Munich II	2–0	2–2	2–2	2–0	6–1	2–1	2–3	1–3	2–5	2–1	2–2	5–1	2–1	—	3–2	1–0	2–1	1–2	1–1	2–0
Preußen Münster	1–1	3–3	1–4	1–1	4–2	0–0	2–0	3–2	2–3	2–0	1–3	0–3	0–1	1–4	—	1–0	1–1	2–1	0–0	2–1
Hansa Rostock	3–0	1–2	1–2	0–1	1–0	3–0	4–0	1–1	3–3	3–1	0–1	2–1	2–1	2–1	1–0	—	1–0	1–1	1–0	1–1
KFC Uerdingen	1–2	1–1	1–1	2–1	1–0	0–3	2–0	0–3	1–1	0–0	0–3	0–0	1–3	0–3	0–2	4–1	—	2–2	1–2	4–2
SpVgg Unterhaching	1–3	2–1	2–2	2–0	0–3	1–2	2–2	1–1	1–1	0–0	0–0	0–0	2–3	0–1	2–2	1–0	1–0	—	5–4	0–0
Würzburger Kickers	3–1	3–0	0–2	0–3	2–2	3–1	4–2	2–0	3–1	0–1	0–0	3–2	2–1	3–1	3–2	3–1	1–2	1–2	—	0–2
FSV Zwickau	3–2	2–1	1–0	0–1	5–1	0–3	2–0	3–5	4–0	0–0	0–1	2–2	2–2	3–0	4–2	2–2	1–2	3–3	1–2	—

Source: DFB
Legend: Blue = home team win; Yellow = draw; Red = away team win.

== Top scorers ==
Rank	Player	Club	Goals
1	(Ghana) Kwasi Okyere Wriedt	Bayern Munich II	24
2	(Kosovo) Albert Bunjaku	Viktoria Köln	20
3	(Austria) Philipp Hosiner	Chemnitzer FC	19
4	(Germany) Martin Kobylański	Eintracht Braunschweig	18
5	(Germany) Deniz Undav	SV Meppen	17
5	(Germany) Mike Wunderlich	Viktoria Köln	17
7	(Germany) Pascal Breier	Hansa Rostock	15
7	(Germany) Sascha Mölders	1860 Munich	15
7	(Germany) Luca Pfeiffer	Würzburger Kickers	15
7	(Germany) Moritz Stoppelkamp	MSV Duisburg	15

== Number of teams by state ==
Position	State	Number of teams	Teams
1	Bavaria	5	FC Ingolstadt, Bayern Munich II, 1860 Munich, SpVgg Unterhaching and Würzburger Kickers
2	North Rhine-Westphalia	4	MSV Duisburg, Viktoria Köln, Preußen Münster and KFC Uerdingen
3	Baden-Württemberg	2	Sonnenhof Großaspach and Waldhof Mannheim
3	Lower Saxony	2	Eintracht Braunschweig and SV Meppen
3	Saxony	2	FSV Zwickau and Chemnitzer FC
3	Saxony-Anhalt	2	Hallescher FC and 1. FC Magdeburg
7	Mecklenburg-Vorpommern	1	Hansa Rostock
7	Rhineland-Palatinate	1	1. FC Kaiserslautern
7	Thuringia	1	Carl Zeiss Jena
