= 2016–17 3. Liga =

9th season of the 3. Liga

3. Liga
- Season: 2016–17
- Champions: MSV Duisburg
- Promoted: MSV Duisburg; Holstein Kiel; Jahn Regensburg
- Relegated: Mainz 05 II; FSV Frankfurt
- Matches: 380
- Goals: 911 (2.4 per match)
- Top goalscorer: Christian Beck (17 goals)
- Biggest home win: FSV Frankfurt 6−0; Fortuna Köln; Lotte 6–0; Paderborn
- Biggest away win: nine games 0−3
- Highest scoring: Bremen II 4−2; Osnabrück; FSV Frankfurt 6−0; Fortuna Köln; Magdeburg 2–4; Chemnitz; Lotte 6–0; Paderborn

The 2016–17 3. Liga was the ninth season of the 3. Liga. Fixtures for the 2016–17 season were announced on 6 July 2016.

== Teams ==
A total of 20 teams contested the league, including 14 sides from the 2015–16 3. Liga. Dynamo Dresden and Erzgebirge Aue were directly promoted to the 2016–17 2. Bundesliga at the end of the 2015–16 season. Erzgebirge made an immediate return to the 2. Bundesliga after being relegated in 2014–15. Dynamo returned to the second level after two seasons in the third tier. The two promoted teams were replaced by FSV Frankfurt and Paderborn, who finished in the bottom two places of the 2015–16 2. Bundesliga table.

At the other end of the table, Stuttgart Kickers, Energie Cottbus and Stuttgart II were relegated to the 2016–17 Regionalliga. The three relegated teams were replaced by the three winners of the 2015–16 Regionalliga promotion playoffs. Jahn Regensburg from the Regionalliga Bayern, immediately returned to national level. Zwickau from the Regionalliga Nordost returned to third level after 16 years and will make their debut in 3. Liga. Sportfreunde Lotte from the Regionalliga West is playing its debut season in the 3. Liga.

A further place in the league was available via a two-legged play-off between Würzburger Kickers, third of the 3. Liga and MSV Duisburg, 16th of 2. Bundesliga. The tie ended 4–1 on aggregate for Bavarian side and Würzburger Kickers were promoted to the second level after making successively promotions and 38 years in lower leagues. Thus, Duisburg immediately returned to third level.

=== Stadiums and locations ===
Locations of the 2016–17 3. Liga teams

Team	Location	Stadium	Capacity
VfR Aalen	Aalen	Scholz-Arena	14,500
Chemnitzer FC	Chemnitz	Stadion an der Gellertstraße	18,712
MSV Duisburg	Duisburg	MSV-Arena	31,500
Rot-Weiß Erfurt	Erfurt	Steigerwaldstadion	18,611
FSV Frankfurt	Frankfurt	Frankfurter Volksbank Stadion	12,542
Hallescher FC	Halle	Erdgas Sportpark	15,057
Holstein Kiel	Kiel	Holstein-Stadion	11,386
Fortuna Köln	Cologne	Südstadion	14,800
Sportfreunde Lotte	Lotte	Sportpark am Lotter Kreuz	7,414
1. FC Magdeburg	Magdeburg	MDCC-Arena	27,500
Mainz 05 II	Mainz	Stadion am Bruchweg	20,300
Preußen Münster	Münster	Preußenstadion	15,050
VfL Osnabrück	Osnabrück	Osnatel-Arena	16,667
SC Paderborn	Paderborn	Benteler Arena	15,000
Jahn Regensburg	Regensburg	Continental Arena	15,224
Hansa Rostock	Rostock	Ostseestadion	29,000
SG Sonnenhof Großaspach	Aspach	Mechatronik Arena	10,000
SV Wehen Wiesbaden	Wiesbaden	BRITA-Arena	12,250
Werder Bremen II	Bremen	Weserstadion Platz 11	5,500
FSV Zwickau	Zwickau	Stadion Zwickau	10,049

=== Personnel and kits ===
Team	Manager	Captain	Kit manufacturer	Shirt sponsor
VfR Aalen	(Germany) Peter Vollmann	(Germany) Markus Schwabl	Saller	Prowin
Chemnitzer FC	(Germany) Sven Köhler	(Germany) Kevin Conrad	Adidas	Ahorn Hotels
MSV Duisburg	(Bulgaria) Iliya Gruev	(Bosnia and Herzegovina) Branimir Bajić	Uhlsport	Black Crevice
Rot-Weiß Erfurt	(Germany) Stefan Krämer	(Poland) Sebastian Tyrała	Jako	Thüringer Energie AG
FSV Frankfurt	(Italy) Gino Lettieri	(Germany) Patrick Ochs	Saller	Ayondo
Hallescher FC	(Germany) Rico Schmitt	(Albania) Klaus Gjasula	Puma	Helplus
Holstein Kiel	(Germany) Markus Anfang	(Germany) Rafael Czichos	Adidas	Famila
Fortuna Köln	(Germany) Uwe Koschinat	(Germany) Daniel Flottmann	Jako	HIT Handelsgruppe
Sportfreunde Lotte	(Germany) Ismail Atalan	(Germany) Gerrit Nauber	Puma	FRIMO Group
1. FC Magdeburg	(Germany) Jens Härtel	(Germany) Christian Beck	Uhlsport	FAM
Mainz 05 II	(Germany) Sandro Schwarz	(Germany) Daniel Bohl	Lotto	Kömmerling
SC Paderborn	(Germany) Steffen Baumgart	(Germany) Tim Sebastian	Saller	Mediacom
Preußen Münster	(Germany) Benno Möhlmann	(Germany) Adriano Grimaldi	Nike	Tuja Zeitarbeit
VfL Osnabrück	(United States) Joe Enochs	(Germany) Halil Savran	Adidas	Sparkasse
Jahn Regensburg	(Germany) Heiko Herrlich	(Lithuania) Markus Palionis	Saller	Netto
Hansa Rostock	(Germany) Christian Brand	(Germany) Michael Gardawski	Nike	kurzurlaub.de
SG Sonnenhof Großaspach	(Germany) Oliver Zapel	(Germany) Daniel Hägele	Hummel	Urbacher Mineralquellen
SV Wehen Wiesbaden	(Germany) Rüdiger Rehm	(Germany) Patrick Funk	Nike	Brita
Werder Bremen II	(Germany) Florian Kohfeldt	(Poland) Rafael Kazior	Nike	Wiesenhof
FSV Zwickau	(Germany) Torsten Ziegner	(Germany) Robert Paul	Puma	Zwickauer Energieversorgung

=== Managerial changes ===
Team	Outgoing manager	Manner of departure	Date of vacancy	Position in table	Incoming manager	Date of appointment
FSV Frankfurt	(Germany) Falko Götz	End of contract	30 May 2016	Preseason	(Germany) Roland Vrabec	15 June 2016
SG Sonnenhof Großaspach	(Germany) Rüdiger Rehm	Signed by Arminia Bielefeld	30 June 2016	Preseason	(Germany) Oliver Zapel	1 July 2016
Holstein Kiel	(Germany) Karsten Neitzel	Sacked	16 August 2016	13th	(Germany) Markus Anfang	29 August 2016
Werder Bremen II	(Germany) Alexander Nouri	Promoted to first team	18 September 2016	14th	(Germany) Florian Kohfeldt	2 October 2016
Preußen Münster	(Germany) Horst Steffen	Sacked	4 October 2016	19th	(Germany) Benno Möhlmann	15 October 2016
SC Paderborn	(Germany) René Müller	Sacked	20 November 2016	17th	(Germany) Stefan Emmerling	6 December 2016
Wehen Wiesbaden	(Germany) Torsten Fröhling	Sacked	6 February 2017	18th	(Germany) Rüdiger Rehm	13 February 2017
FSV Frankfurt	(Germany) Roland Vrabec	Sacked	6 March 2017	17th	(Italy) Gino Lettieri	7 March 2017
SC Paderborn	(Germany) Stefan Emmerling	Sacked	16 April 2017	18th	(Germany) Steffen Baumgart	16 April 2017
Hansa Rostock	(Germany) Christian Brand	Sacked	13 May 2017	14th	(Germany) Uwe Ehlers	13 May 2017

== League table ==
Pos	Team	Pld	W	D	L	GF	GA	GD	Pts	Promotion, qualification or relegation
1	MSV Duisburg (C, P)	38	18	14	6	52	32	+20	68	Promotion to 2. Bundesliga and qualification for DFB-Pokal
2	Holstein Kiel (P)	38	18	13	7	59	25	+34	67	Promotion to 2. Bundesliga and qualification for DFB-Pokal
3	Jahn Regensburg (O, P)	38	18	9	11	62	50	+12	63	Qualification for promotion play-offs and DFB-Pokal
4	1. FC Magdeburg	38	16	13	9	53	36	+17	61	Qualification for DFB-Pokal
5	FSV Zwickau	38	16	8	14	47	54	−7	56	
6	VfL Osnabrück	38	15	9	14	46	43	+3	54	
7	Wehen Wiesbaden	38	14	11	13	45	42	+3	53	
8	Chemnitzer FC	38	14	10	14	54	51	+3	52	
9	Preußen Münster	38	15	6	17	49	43	+6	51	
10	Sonnenhof Großaspach	38	14	9	15	48	48	0	51	
11	VfR Aalen (Note: On 10 March 2017, VfR Aalen was deducted nine points for filing in for insolvency. On 15 March 2017, Aalen objected the decision. The DFB rejected the appeal on 24 March 2017. After Aalen again appealed the decision, it was rejected once more on 11 April 2017. On 4 May 2017, the DFB rejected the next appeal from Aalen. It was again denied on 18 May 2017.)	38	14	15	9	52	36	+16	48	
12	Sportfreunde Lotte	38	13	9	16	46	47	−1	48	
13	Hallescher FC	38	10	18	10	34	39	−5	48	
14	Rot-Weiß Erfurt	38	12	11	15	34	47	−13	47	
15	Hansa Rostock	38	10	16	12	44	46	−2	46	
16	Fortuna Köln	38	12	10	16	37	59	−22	46	
17	Werder Bremen II (Note: Reserve teams are ineligible for promotion or DFB-Pokal qualification.)	38	12	9	17	32	48	−16	45	
18	SC Paderborn (Note: SC Paderborn were originally relegated from the 2016–17 3. Liga after finishing 18th. However, 1860 Munich, who were relegated from the 2016–17 2. Bundesliga, were unable to obtain a license for the 2017–18 3. Liga. Therefore, SC Paderborn, who submitted a 3. Liga license application, remained in the league for the 2017–18 season.)	38	12	8	18	38	57	−19	44	
19	Mainz 05 II (R)	38	11	7	20	41	58	−17	40	Relegation to Regionalliga
20	FSV Frankfurt (Note: On 24 April 2017, FSV Frankfurt was deducted nine points for filing in for insolvency. Frankfurt appealed on 27 April 2017. On 4 May 2017, the appeal was rejected from the DFB. Another appeal was turned down on 10 May 2017. Frankfurt accepted the penalty on 17 May 2017.) (R)	38	7	13	18	38	50	−12	25	Relegation to Regionalliga

Source: DFB
Rules for classification: 1) Points; 2) Goal difference; 3) Goals scored
(C) Champions; (O) Play-off winners; (P) Promoted; (R) Relegated

== Results ==
Home \ Away	AAL	BR2	CFC	DUI	ERF	FSV	SGS	HFC	KSV	FKO	SFL	FCM	MA2	PRM	OSN	SCP	JRE	ROS	WEH	ZWI
VfR Aalen	—	3–0	2–2	2–1	1–1	2–0	2–0	1–1	1–0	3–0	1–1	2–2	0–0	1–0	1–1	4–0	1–2	1–1	1–1	0–1
Werder Bremen II	1–0	—	0–0	0–0	1–0	0–0	1–0	1–1	0–2	1–1	0–3	0–1	2–1	0–1	4–2	1–0	3–1	0–2	0–1	1–3
Chemnitzer FC	0–1	1–1	—	2–3	1–1	2–1	0–0	1–1	2–2	3–1	0–1	1–1	4–1	0–3	3–0	2–1	0–3	2–0	4–2	1–0
MSV Duisburg	2–2	1–0	1–0	—	3–2	3–2	2–1	0–0	0–0	2–0	1–1	0–0	4–0	3–2	2–2	1–0	1–1	0–1	0–1	5–1
Rot-Weiß Erfurt	0–0	1–1	1–2	0–1	—	1–0	4–1	0–3	1–1	3–0	0–3	1–0	0–0	0–0	1–0	1–3	1–4	1–2	1–0	1–3
FSV Frankfurt	2–1	0–4	0–3	0–0	0–1	—	1–3	0–1	0–0	6–0	2–0	0–1	1–2	4–1	1–1	3–0	1–1	0–0	3–1	0–1
Sonnenhof Großaspach	2–2	0–0	2–2	0–0	2–1	3–1	—	3–0	0–1	2–3	2–0	1–3	2–1	2–0	1–0	2–3	3–4	1–1	2–1	1–2
Hallescher FC	1–4	2–0	1–1	1–1	1–0	1–1	0–1	—	0–0	0–0	2–0	1–1	2–0	2–1	1–0	1–1	1–1	0–0	0–3	3–2
Holstein Kiel	2–2	3–1	2–0	2–0	0–0	1–1	1–2	3–0	—	5–1	3–1	1–1	3–0	0–0	0–1	2–1	2–1	2–1	3–0	3–0
Fortuna Köln	0–2	2–0	1–0	0–3	0–1	0–0	2–0	1–1	1–0	—	3–0	2–1	1–0	0–1	1–1	0–1	2–2	0–2	0–0	2–1
Sportfreunde Lotte	0–2	1–2	3–0	0–2	2–2	0–1	2–1	0–0	0–0	0–1	—	1–3	3–3	1–0	0–0	6–0	3–2	2–0	0–0	2–1
1. FC Magdeburg	3–0	2–0	2–4	1–2	2–0	1–1	2–1	1–0	1–0	0–3	2–0	—	1–2	1–0	3–0	3–0	1–2	1–1	0–0	1–1
Mainz 05 II	2–0	0–1	0–1	0–2	1–1	1–0	0–2	3–2	0–3	4–0	0–2	1–0	—	3–1	2–2	0–1	2–0	2–4	1–2	2–2
Preußen Münster	2–1	4–0	1–0	1–1	4–0	2–1	3–0	1–1	1–1	4–2	1–0	2–3	1–0	—	0–1	0–1	0–1	3–1	2–2	5–1
VfL Osnabrück	1–0	0–1	3–0	1–1	3–0	1–1	1–0	1–2	2–1	1–2	3–0	3–2	1–2	3–0	—	0–0	1–2	2–1	1–0	1–0
SC Paderborn	0–0	1–2	4–2	0–1	0–1	3–0	1–2	0–0	1–3	1–1	3–1	1–1	3–1	1–0	3–1	—	0–2	0–3	0–1	1–1
Jahn Regensburg	0–2	3–1	3–2	1–2	0–1	2–1	1–1	2–0	0–3	2–2	2–0	1–1	2–1	3–1	1–2	3–0	—	2–0	3–1	1–2
Hansa Rostock	1–1	1–1	1–3	1–0	1–2	1–1	0–0	1–0	1–4	1–1	1–3	1–1	1–1	1–0	1–2	1–1	0–0	—	1–3	5–0
Wehen Wiesbaden	1–2	2–0	0–3	3–0	0–0	4–1	0–0	1–1	0–0	3–0	0–3	0–3	0–2	1–0	2–1	1–2	1–1	1–1	—	3–0
FSV Zwickau	2–1	2–1	1–0	1–1	1–2	1–1	0–2	2–0	1–0	2–1	1–1	0–0	1–0	0–1	1–0	3–0	4–0	2–2	0–3	—

Source: DFB
Legend: Blue = home team win; Yellow = draw; Red = away team win.

== Top goalscorers ==
Rank	Player	Club	Goals
1	(Germany) Christian Beck	1. FC Magdeburg	17
2	(Germany) Ronny König	FSV Zwickau	15
3	(Germany) Lucas Röser	Sonnenhof Großaspach	14
4	(Germany) Hamdi Dahmani	Fortuna Köln	13
4	(Germany) Marco Grüttner	Jahn Regensburg	13
4	(Poland) Matthias Morys	VfR Aalen	13
4	(Germany) Manuel Schäffler	Wehen Wiesbaden	13
8	(Germany) Anton Fink	Chemnitzer FC	12
8	(Germany) Adriano Grimaldi	Preußen Münster	12
8	(Ghana) Kingsley Schindler	Holstein Kiel	12
8	(Ghana) Kwasi Okyere Wriedt	VfL Osnabrück	12

== Number of teams by state ==
Position	State	Number of teams	Teams
1	North Rhine-Westphalia	5	MSV Duisburg, Fortuna Köln, Sportfreunde Lotte, Preußen Münster and SC Paderborn
2	Baden-Württemberg	2	VfR Aalen and SG Sonnenhof Großaspach
2	Hesse	2	FSV Frankfurt and Wehen Wiesbaden
2	Saxony	2	Chemnitzer FC and FSV Zwickau
2	Saxony-Anhalt	2	Hallescher FC and 1. FC Magdeburg
6	Bavaria	1	Jahn Regensburg
6	Bremen	1	Werder Bremen II
6	Lower Saxony	1	VfL Osnabrück
6	Mecklenburg-Vorpommern	1	Hansa Rostock
6	Rhineland-Palatinate	1	Mainz 05 II
6	Schleswig-Holstein	1	Holstein Kiel
6	Thuringia	1	Rot-Weiß Erfurt
