= 2022–23 2. Bundesliga =

2. Bundesliga
- Season: 2022–23
- Dates: 15 July 2022 – 28 May 2023
- Champions: 1. FC Heidenheim
- Promoted: 1. FC Heidenheim; Darmstadt 98
- Relegated: Arminia Bielefeld (via play-off); Jahn Regensburg; SV Sandhausen
- Matches: 306
- Goals: 901 (2.94 per match)
- Top goalscorer: Tim Kleindienst (25 goals)
- Biggest home win: Paderborn 5–0 Karlsruhe; Paderborn 7–2 Kiel; Heidenheim 5–0 Nürnberg; Hamburg 6–1 Hannover
- Biggest away win: Regensburg 0–6 Karlsruhe
- Highest scoring: Paderborn 7–2 Kiel; Heidenheim 5–4 Regensburg
- Longest winning run: 10 games St. Pauli
- Longest unbeaten run: 21 games Darmstadt
- Longest winless run: 9 games SV Sandhausen
- Longest losing run: 4 games Bielefeld; Braunschweig; Sandhausen
- Highest attendance: 57,000; Hamburg v Kaiserslautern
- Lowest attendance: 4,137; Sandhausen v Hannover
- Attendance: 6,779,038 (22,154 per match)

The 2022–23 2. Bundesliga was the 49th season of the 2. Bundesliga. It began on 15 July 2022 and concluded on 28 May 2023.

The fixtures were announced on 17 June 2022.

1. FC Heidenheim and Darmstadt 98 were promoted to the Bundesliga, while Arminia Bielefeld, Jahn Regensburg and SV Sandhausen got relegated to the 3. Liga.

== Teams ==
Locations of the 2022–23 2. Bundesliga teams

=== Team changes ===
Promoted from 2021–22 3. Liga	Relegated from 2021–22 Bundesliga	Promoted to 2022–23 Bundesliga	Relegated to 2022–23 3. Liga
1. FC Magdeburg; Eintracht Braunschweig; 1. FC Kaiserslautern	Arminia Bielefeld; Greuther Fürth	Schalke 04; Werder Bremen	Dynamo Dresden; Erzgebirge Aue; FC Ingolstadt

=== Stadiums and locations ===
Team	Location	Stadium	Capacity
Arminia Bielefeld	Bielefeld	Schüco-Arena	27,300
Eintracht Braunschweig	Braunschweig	Eintracht-Stadion	23,325
Darmstadt 98	Darmstadt	Merck-Stadion am Böllenfalltor	17,000
Fortuna Düsseldorf	Düsseldorf	Merkur Spiel-Arena	54,600
Greuther Fürth	Fürth	Sportpark Ronhof Thomas Sommer	16,626
Hamburger SV	Hamburg	Volksparkstadion	57,000
Hannover 96	Hanover	Heinz von Heiden Arena	49,000
1. FC Heidenheim	Heidenheim	Voith-Arena	15,000
1. FC Kaiserslautern	Kaiserslautern	Fritz-Walter-Stadion	49,780
Karlsruher SC	Karlsruhe	BBBank Wildpark	29,699
Holstein Kiel	Kiel	Holstein-Stadion	15,034
1. FC Magdeburg	Magdeburg	MDCC-Arena	30,098
1. FC Nürnberg	Nuremberg	Max-Morlock-Stadion	49,923
SC Paderborn	Paderborn	Home Deluxe Arena	15,000
Jahn Regensburg	Regensburg	Jahnstadion Regensburg	15,210
Hansa Rostock	Rostock	Ostseestadion	29,000
SV Sandhausen	Sandhausen	BWT-Stadion am Hardtwald	15,414
FC St. Pauli	Hamburg	Millerntor-Stadion	29,546

=== Personnel and kits ===
Team	Manager	Captain	Kit manufacturer	Shirt sponsor	
Team	Manager	Captain	Kit manufacturer	Front	Sleeve
Arminia Bielefeld	(Germany) Uwe Koschinat	(Germany) Fabian Klos	Macron	Schüco	JAB Anstoetz Textilien
Eintracht Braunschweig	(Germany) Michael Schiele	(Bosnia and Herzegovina) Jasmin Fejzić	Puma	Kosatec Computer	Juskys
Darmstadt 98	(Germany) Torsten Lieberknecht	(Germany) Fabian Holland	Craft	Software AG	28 Black
Fortuna Düsseldorf	(Germany) Daniel Thioune	(Germany) André Hoffmann	Adidas	Henkel	C&K Logistik
Greuther Fürth	(Germany) Alexander Zorniger	(Sweden) Branimir Hrgota	Puma	Hofmann Personal	Signia
Hamburger SV	(Germany) Tim Walter	(Germany) Sebastian Schonlau	Adidas	HanseMerkur	Popp Feinkost
Hannover 96	(Germany) Stefan Leitl	(Germany) Ron-Robert Zieler	Macron	BRAINHOUSE247	TRAVNIK Group
1. FC Heidenheim	(Germany) Frank Schmidt	(Germany) Patrick Mainka	Puma	MHP	Voith
1. FC Kaiserslautern	(Germany) Dirk Schuster	(Germany) Jean Zimmer	Nike	Allgäuer Latschenkiefer	Lotto Rheinland-Pfalz
Karlsruher SC	(Germany) Christian Eichner	(Germany) Jérôme Gondorf	Macron	GEM Ingenieurgesellschaft (H)/CG Elementum (A)	E.G.O.-Gruppe
Holstein Kiel	(Germany) Marcel Rapp	(Germany) Hauke Wahl	Puma	Famila	Lotto Schleswig-Holstein
1. FC Magdeburg	(Germany) Christian Titz	(Germany) Amara Condé	Uhlsport	Humanas	SWM Magdeburg
1. FC Nürnberg	(Germany) Dieter Hecking	(Germany) Christopher Schindler	Adidas	Nürnberger Versicherung	Exasol
SC Paderborn	(Poland) Lukas Kwasniok	(Germany) Ron Schallenberg	Saller	Bremer AG	sky Personal
Jahn Regensburg	(United States) Joe Enochs	(Germany) Benedikt Gimber	Saller	Netto	Wolf GmbH
Hansa Rostock	(Germany) Alois Schwartz	(Germany) Markus Kolke	Nike	28 Black	SoftClean
SV Sandhausen	(Germany) Gerhard Kleppinger	(Germany) Dennis Diekmeier	Macron	Weingut Reichsrat von Buhl	Goelz Paletten
FC St. Pauli	(Germany) Fabian Hürzeler	(Kosovo) Leart Paqarada (Australia) Jackson Irvine	DIIY	Congstar	Astra Brauerei

=== Managerial changes ===
Team	Outgoing	Manner	Exit date		Position in table	Incoming	Incoming date		Ref.
Team	Outgoing	Manner	Announced on	Departed on	Position in table	Incoming	Announced on	Arrived on	Ref.
Arminia Bielefeld	(Germany) Marco Kostmann (interim)	End of caretaker	20 April 2022	30 June 2022	Pre-season	(Italy) Ulrich Forte	4 June 2022	1 July 2022	
Greuther Fürth	(Germany) Stefan Leitl	Resigned	27 April 2022	30 June 2022	Pre-season	(Switzerland) Marc Schneider	17 May 2022	1 July 2022	
Hannover 96	(Germany) Christoph Dabrowski	End of contract	5 May 2022	30 June 2022	Pre-season	(Germany) Stefan Leitl	8 May 2022	1 July 2022	
Arminia Bielefeld	(Italy) Ulrich Forte	Sacked	17 August 2022		17th	(Germany) Daniel Scherning	18 August 2022	19 August 2022	
1. FC Nürnberg	(Germany) Robert Klauß	Sacked	3 October 2022		14th	(Germany) Markus Weinzierl	4 October 2022		
Greuther Fürth	(Switzerland) Marc Schneider	Sacked	15 October 2022		16th	(Germany) Rainer Widmayer (Germany) Stefan Kleineheismann (interim)	15 October 2022		
Greuther Fürth	(Germany) Rainer Widmayer (Germany) Stefan Kleineheismann (interim)	End of caretaker	23 October 2022		18th	(Germany) Alexander Zorniger	23 October 2022		
Hansa Rostock	(Germany) Jens Härtel	Sacked	6 November 2022		12th	(Germany) Patrick Glöckner	7 November 2022		
FC St. Pauli	(Germany) Timo Schultz	Sacked	6 December 2022		15th	(Germany) Fabian Hürzeler	23 December 2022		
SV Sandhausen	(Germany) Alois Schwartz	Sacked	19 February 2023		18th	(Germany) Tomas Oral	20 February 2023		
1. FC Nürnberg	(Germany) Markus Weinzierl	Sacked	20 February 2023		13th	(Germany) Dieter Hecking (interim)	20 February 2023		
Arminia Bielefeld	(Germany) Daniel Scherning	Sacked	7 March 2023		16th	(Germany) Uwe Koschinat	9 March 2023		
Hansa Rostock	(Germany) Patrick Glöckner	Sacked	20 March 2023		17th	(Germany) Alois Schwartz	22 March 2023		
SV Sandhausen	(Germany) Tomas Oral	Sacked	10 April 2023		18th	(Germany) Gerhard Kleppinger (interim)	10 April 2023		
Jahn Regensburg	(Bosnia and Herzegovina) Mersad Selimbegović	Sacked	9 May 2023		18th	(United States) Joe Enochs	10 May 2023		

== League table ==
Pos	Team	Pld	W	D	L	GF	GA	GD	Pts	Promotion, qualification or relegation
1	1. FC Heidenheim (C, P)	34	19	10	5	67	36	+31	67	Promotion to Bundesliga
2	Darmstadt 98 (P)	34	20	7	7	50	33	+17	67	Promotion to Bundesliga
3	Hamburger SV	34	20	6	8	70	45	+25	66	Qualification for promotion play-offs
4	Fortuna Düsseldorf	34	17	7	10	60	43	+17	58	
5	FC St. Pauli	34	16	10	8	55	39	+16	58	
6	SC Paderborn	34	16	7	11	68	44	+24	55	
7	Karlsruher SC	34	13	7	14	56	53	+3	46	
8	Holstein Kiel	34	12	10	12	58	61	−3	46	
9	1. FC Kaiserslautern	34	11	12	11	47	48	−1	45	
10	Hannover 96	34	12	8	14	50	55	−5	44	
11	1. FC Magdeburg	34	12	7	15	48	55	−7	43	
12	Greuther Fürth	34	10	11	13	47	50	−3	41	
13	Hansa Rostock	34	12	5	17	32	48	−16	41	
14	1. FC Nürnberg	34	10	9	15	32	49	−17	39	
15	Eintracht Braunschweig	34	9	9	16	42	59	−17	36	
16	Arminia Bielefeld (R)	34	9	7	18	50	62	−12	34	Qualification for relegation play-offs
17	Jahn Regensburg (R)	34	8	7	19	34	58	−24	31	Relegation to 3. Liga
18	SV Sandhausen (R)	34	7	7	20	35	63	−28	28	Relegation to 3. Liga

Source: DFB
Rules for classification: 1) Points; 2) Goal difference; 3) Goals scored; 4) Head-to-head results; 5) Head-to-head away goals scored; 6) Away goals scored; 7) Play-off.
(C) Champions; (P) Promoted; (R) Relegated

== Results ==
Home \ Away	BIE	BRA	DAR	DÜS	FÜR	HAM	HAN	HEI	KAI	KAR	KIE	MAG	NÜR	PAD	REG	ROS	SAN	STP
Arminia Bielefeld	—	4–1	3–1	2–2	1–1	0–2	1–3	0–1	2–3	1–2	4–2	3–1	2–2	2–2	0–3	0–1	1–2	2–0
Eintracht Braunschweig	3–3	—	0–1	2–2	0–1	0–2	1–0	2–0	1–0	2–1	2–3	1–2	4–2	0–0	1–2	0–1	2–1	2–1
Darmstadt 98	1–1	2–1	—	1–0	1–1	1–1	1–0	2–2	2–0	2–1	1–1	1–0	2–0	2–1	2–0	4–0	2–1	0–3
Fortuna Düsseldorf	4–1	3–1	1–0	—	2–2	2–2	3–3	1–1	1–2	3–2	3–0	3–2	0–1	2–1	4–0	3–1	2–0	1–0
Greuther Fürth	1–0	2–2	4–0	2–1	—	1–0	1–1	0–2	1–3	1–1	2–2	3–0	1–0	2–1	2–1	2–2	1–1	2–2
Hamburger SV	2–1	4–2	1–2	2–0	2–1	—	6–1	1–0	1–1	1–0	0–0	2–3	3–0	2–2	3–1	0–1	4–2	4–3
Hannover 96	2–0	1–1	2–1	2–0	2–1	1–2	—	0–3	1–3	1–0	1–5	1–2	3–0	3–4	1–0	1–1	3–1	2–2
1. FC Heidenheim	1–1	3–0	1–0	2–1	3–1	3–3	2–1	—	2–2	5–2	3–0	0–0	5–0	3–0	5–4	2–0	1–0	0–1
1. FC Kaiserslautern	1–2	1–1	3–3	0–3	3–1	2–0	2–1	2–2	—	2–0	2–1	4–4	0–0	0–1	0–3	0–1	2–2	2–1
Karlsruher SC	4–2	1–1	1–2	0–2	2–1	4–2	2–1	0–0	2–0	—	1–4	2–3	3–0	0–1	1–0	2–0	3–2	4–4
Holstein Kiel	2–3	3–0	0–3	1–2	2–1	2–3	1–1	3–1	2–2	2–1	—	2–3	2–1	1–1	1–2	1–1	1–0	3–4
1. FC Magdeburg	4–0	0–2	0–1	1–2	2–1	3–2	0–4	1–1	2–0	1–1	1–2	—	2–2	0–0	1–0	3–0	1–2	1–2
1. FC Nürnberg	1–0	2–0	0–1	2–0	2–0	0–2	0–0	0–3	3–3	1–1	2–3	1–2	—	2–1	1–0	0–0	1–0	0–1
SC Paderborn	0–2	5–1	1–2	4–1	3–2	2–3	4–2	3–2	1–0	5–0	7–2	1–0	0–1	—	3–0	3–0	3–0	1–2
Jahn Regensburg	1–3	1–1	2–0	0–1	2–2	1–5	1–1	2–3	0–0	0–6	0–0	2–2	0–0	1–0	—	0–3	2–1	2–0
Hansa Rostock	2–1	2–1	0–1	2–5	2–0	0–2	0–1	0–1	0–2	0–2	2–3	3–1	1–1	0–3	2–0	—	0–1	2–0
SV Sandhausen	2–1	2–2	0–4	1–0	0–2	0–1	2–3	3–4	0–0	0–3	1–1	1–0	1–2	2–2	2–1	1–2	—	0–5
FC St. Pauli	2–1	1–2	1–1	0–0	2–1	3–0	2–0	0–0	1–0	1–1	0–0	3–0	3–2	2–2	1–0	1–0	1–1	—

Source: DFB
Legend: Blue = home team win; Yellow = draw; Red = away team win.

== Promotion/relegation play-offs ==
The promotion/relegation play-offs took place on 2 and 6 June 2023.

=== Overview ===
Team 1	Agg.	Team 2	1st leg	2nd leg
Wehen Wiesbaden	6–1	Arminia Bielefeld	4–0	2–1

=== Matches ===
All times Central European Summer Time (UTC+2)

2 June 2023
20:45

Wehen Wiesbaden	4–0	Arminia Bielefeld
Prtajin 6'; Wurtz 50'; Hollerbach 60'; Iredale 82'	Report

Brita-Arena, Wiesbaden
Attendance: 11,008
Referee: Benjamin Brand
6 June 2023
20:45

Arminia Bielefeld	1–2	Wehen Wiesbaden
Klos 4'	Report	Hollerbach 35', 45+2'

Schüco-Arena, Bielefeld
Attendance: 26,000
Referee: Christian Dingert

Wehen Wiesbaden won 6–1 on aggregate and was promoted to the 2. Bundesliga. Arminia Bielefeld is relegated to the 3. Liga.

== Statistics ==
=== Top goalscorers ===
Rank	Player	Club	Goals
1	(Germany) Tim Kleindienst	1. FC Heidenheim	25
2	(Germany) Robert Glatzel	Hamburger SV	19
3	(Germany) Steven Skrzybski	Holstein Kiel	15
4	(Poland) Dawid Kownacki	Fortuna Düsseldorf	14
4	(Germany) Cedric Teuchert	Hannover 96	14
6	(United States) Terrence Boyd	1. FC Kaiserslautern	13
6	(Germany) Fabian Schleusener	Karlsruher SC	13
8	(Germany) Jan-Niklas Beste	1. FC Heidenheim	12
8	(Germany) Phillip Tietz	Darmstadt 98	12
10	(Switzerland) Kwadwo Duah	1. FC Nürnberg	11
10	(Sweden) Branimir Hrgota	Greuther Fürth	11
10	(Germany) Robert Leipertz	SC Paderborn	11
10	(Germany) Fabian Reese	Holstein Kiel	11

=== Hat-tricks ===
Player	Club	Against	Result	Date
(Germany) Tim Kleindienst^{4}	1. FC Heidenheim	1. FC Nürnberg	5–0 (H)	19 February 2023
(Germany) Tim Kleindienst	1. FC Heidenheim	Karlsruher SC	5–2 (H)	17 March 2023

- ^{4} Player scored four goals.

=== Clean sheets ===
Rank	Player	Club	Clean sheets
1	(Germany) Kevin Müller	1. FC Heidenheim	15
2	(Germany) Marcel Schuhen	Darmstadt 98	12
2	(Bosnia and Herzegovina) Nikola Vasilj	FC St. Pauli	12
4	(Portugal) Daniel Heuer Fernandes	Hamburger SV	10
4	(Germany) Jannik Huth	SC Paderborn	10
6	(Germany) Florian Kastenmeier	Fortuna Düsseldorf	9
6	(Germany) Markus Kolke	Hansa Rostock	9
8	(Germany) Marius Gersbeck	Karlsruher SC	8
8	(Germany) Ron-Robert Zieler	Hannover 96	8
10	(Sweden) Andreas Linde	Greuther Fürth	7

== Number of teams by state ==
Position	State	Number	Teams
1	Baden-Württemberg	3	1. FC Heidenheim, Karlsruher SC and SV Sandhausen
1	Bavaria	3	Greuther Fürth, 1. FC Nürnberg and Jahn Regensburg
1	North Rhine-Westphalia	3	Arminia Bielefeld, Fortuna Düsseldorf and SC Paderborn
4	Hamburg	2	Hamburger SV and FC St. Pauli
4	Lower Saxony	2	Eintracht Braunschweig, Hannover 96
6	Hesse	1	Darmstadt 98
6	Mecklenburg-Vorpommern	1	Hansa Rostock
6	Rhineland-Palatinate	1	1. FC Kaiserslautern
6	Saxony-Anhalt	1	1. FC Magdeburg
6	Schleswig-Holstein	1	Holstein Kiel

== Attendances ==
#	Football club	Home games	Average attendance
1	Hamburger SV	17	53,529
2	1. FC Kaiserslautern	17	39,910
3	Hannover 96	17	30,835
4	1. FC Nürnberg	17	30,335
5	Fortuna Düsseldorf	17	29,447
6	FC St. Pauli	17	29,357
7	Hansa Rostock	17	24,794
8	1. FC Magdeburg	17	22,664
9	Arminia Bielefeld	17	21,357
10	BTSV Eintracht	17	18,955
11	Karlsruher SC	17	18,838
12	Darmstadt 98	17	15,685
13	SC Paderborn	17	12,203
14	KSV Holstein	17	12,163
15	Greuther Fürth	17	11,233
16	1. FC Heidenheim	17	11,180
17	Jahn Regensburg	17	10,712
18	SV Sandhausen	17	6,101

Source: European Football Statistics
