= Ronny König =

German footballer

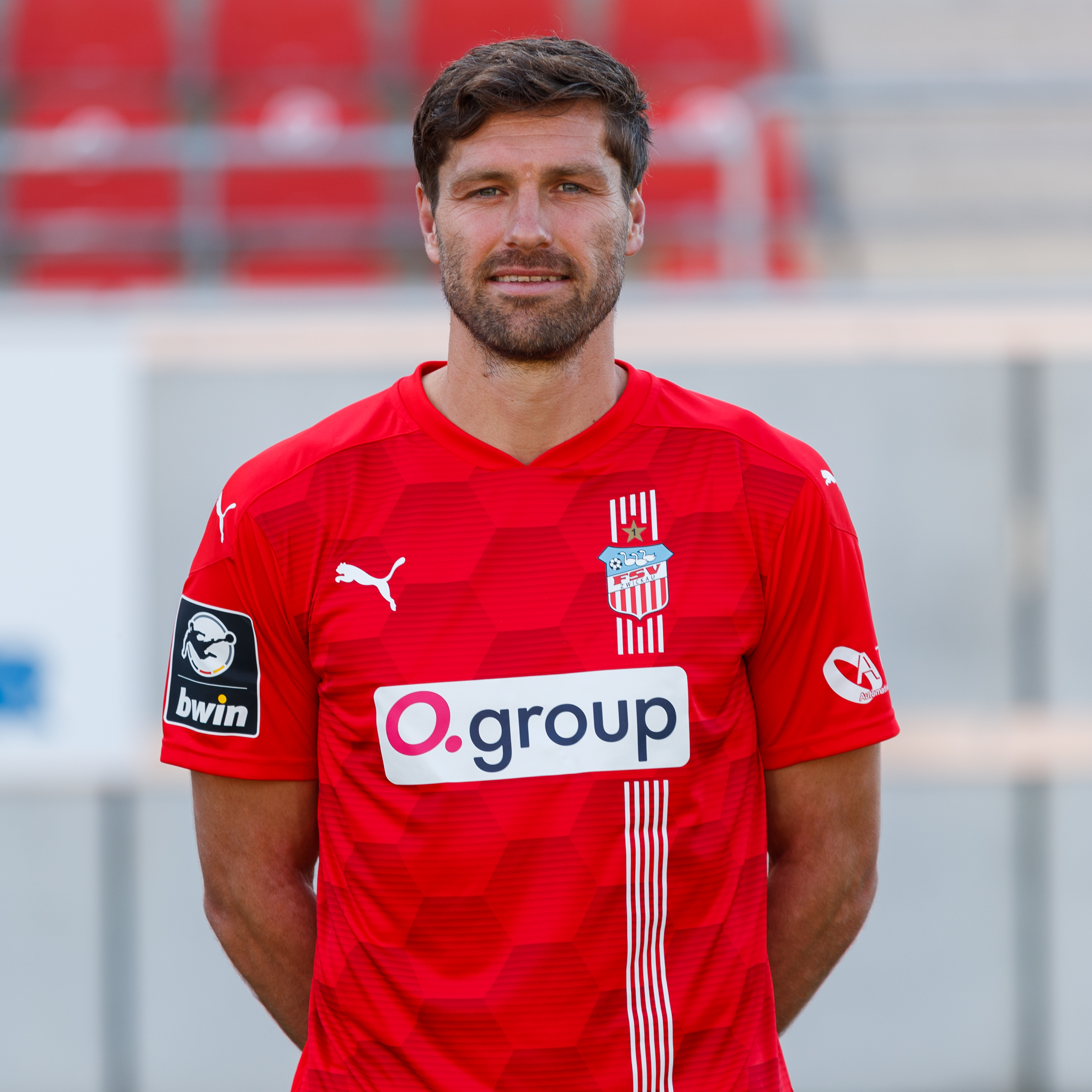
- König in 2021

Personal information
- Date of birth: 2 June 1983 (age 43)
- Place of birth: Lichtenstein, Bezirk Karl-Marx-Stadt, East Germany
- Height: 1.90 m (6 ft 3 in)
- Position: Striker

Youth career
- –2000: SSV St. Egidien
- 2000–2001: Chemnitzer FC

Senior career*
Years	Team	Apps	(Gls)
2001–2004	Chemnitzer FC	16	(0)
2004–2006	1. FC Kaiserslautern II	77	(21)
2006–2009	SV Wehen Wiesbaden	91	(24)
2009–2011	Rot-Weiß Oberhausen	61	(13)
2011–2014	Erzgebirge Aue	79	(13)
2014–2015	Darmstadt 98	19	(1)
2015–2016	Chemnitzer FC	25	(1)
2016–2023	FSV Zwickau	242	(61)
- * Club domestic league appearances and goals

Ronny König (born 2 June 1983) is a German former professional footballer who played as a striker.

== Career ==
König was born in Lichtenstein, East Germany.

He made his debut on the professional league level in the 2. Bundesliga for SV Wehen Wiesbaden on 17 August 2007 when he came on as a substitute in the 64th minute in a game against VfL Osnabrück.

== Career statistics ==
As of match played 22 May 2021

Appearances and goals by club, season and competition
Club	Season	League			Cup		Total		Ref.
Club	Season	Division	Apps	Goals	Apps	Goals	Apps	Goals	Ref.
Chemnitzer FC	2001–02	Regionalliga Nord	2	0	—		2	0	
Chemnitzer FC	2002–03	Regionalliga Nord	12	0	—		12	0	
Chemnitzer FC	2003–04	Regionalliga Nord	2	0	—		2	0	
Chemnitzer FC	Total		16	0	—		12	0	—
1. FC Kaiserslautern II	2003–04	Regionalliga Süd	14	4	—		14	4	
1. FC Kaiserslautern II	2004–05		30	11	—		30	11	
1. FC Kaiserslautern II	2005–06	Regionalliga Süd	33	6	—		33	6	
1. FC Kaiserslautern II	Total		77	21	—		77	21	—
Wehen Wiesbaden	2006–07	Regionalliga Süd	30	7	—		30	7	
Wehen Wiesbaden	2007–08	2. Bundesliga	30	10	1	0	31	10	
Wehen Wiesbaden	2008–09	2. Bundesliga	31	6	4	2	35	8	
Wehen Wiesbaden	Total		91	23	5	2	96	25	—
Rot-Weiß Oberhausen	2009–10	2. Bundesliga	32	7	2	1	34	8	
Rot-Weiß Oberhausen	2010–11	2. Bundesliga	29	6	1	0	30	6	
Rot-Weiß Oberhausen	Total		61	13	3	1	64	14	—
Erzgebirge Aue	2011–12	2. Bundesliga	33	9	2	1	35	10	
Erzgebirge Aue	2012–13	2. Bundesliga	25	3	2	0	27	3	
Erzgebirge Aue	2013–14	2. Bundesliga	21	1	1	0	22	1	
Erzgebirge Aue	Total		79	13	5	1	84	14	—
SV Darmstadt 98	2014–15	2. Bundesliga	19	1	0	0	19	1	
Chemnitzer FC	2015–16	3. Liga	25	1	1	0	26	1	
FSV Zwickau	2016–17	3. Liga	37	15	1	0	38	15	
FSV Zwickau	2017–18	3. Liga	38	11	—		38	11	
FSV Zwickau	2018–19	3. Liga	37	11	—		37	11	
FSV Zwickau	2019–20	3. Liga	36	8	—		36	8	
FSV Zwickau	2020–21	3. Liga	38	10	—		38	10	
FSV Zwickau	Total		186	55	1	0	186	55	—
Career Total			554	127	15	4	569	131	—
