= Danny König =

German football manager (born 1974)

Personal information
- Date of birth: 18 October 1974 (age 52)
- Place of birth: Aschersleben, Germany

Managerial career
- Years: Team
- –2008: FSV Hettstedt (sporting director)
- 2008–2011: FSV Hettstedt
- 2011–2012: SV 07 Eschwege
- 2012–2013: Torgelower FC Greif
- 2013–2014: 1. FC Magdeburg (assistant)
- 2014: BSV Rehden (assistant)
- 2015–2020: FSV Zwickau (assistant)
- 2018: FSV Zwickau (caretaker)
- 2020–2021: VfB Germania Halberstadt
- 2022–2023: Greifswalder FC (assistant)

Danny König (born 18 October 1974) is a German football manager and former footballer.

== Early life ==
He started playing football at a young age. He studied to be a tax clerk.

== Playing career ==
He played professional football in Paraguay. During his playing career, he planned to become a manager after retiring from professional football.

== Style of play ==
He mainly operated as a midfielder. He was often described as a set-piece specialist.

== Managerial career ==
After his playing career, König was employed as sports director at FSV Hettstedt, for whom he also played at the time. From the 2008-09 season, König became head coach of the club. In 2011, he was appointed manager of German side SV 07 Eschwege.

In 2012, he was appointed manager of German side Torgelower FC Greif. He suffered relegation while managing the club and was fired in April 2013.

Ahead of the 2013-14 season, he was appointed assistant coach of Andreas Petersen at 1. FC Magdeburg. The following season, Petersen and König went to BSV Rehden, which they would lead. In October 2014, König was suddenly fired, by his own admission, without explanation.

Ahead of the 2015-16 season, König was hired as assistant coach for Torsten Ziegner at FSV Zwickau. In March 2018, he extended his contract with the club. On April 25, 2018, manager Ziegner was fired and König was appointed interim manager for the rest of the season. He then continued as assistant coach to Joe Enochs, who was hired as manager ahead of the 2018-19 season.

He left the club in the summer of 2020 when he was appointed manager of VfB Germania Halberstadt. He left the position at the end of the season.

In July 2022, he was appointed assistant coach of Greifswalder FC. He left the position in the summer 2023.

== Personal life ==
He obtained a UEFA A License. His family has been based in Aschersleben, Germany.
