= Nico Neidhart =

German footballer

Personal information
- Date of birth: 27 September 1994 (age 32)
- Place of birth: Flensburg, Germany
- Height: 1.76 m (5 ft 9 in)
- Position: Full back

Youth career
- –2010: VfB Oldenburg
- 2010–2012: VfL Osnabrück

Senior career*
Years	Team	Apps	(Gls)
2012–2013	VfL Osnabrück	2	(0)
2013–2015	Schalke 04 II	50	(6)
2015–2019	Sportfreunde Lotte	94	(6)
2019	FC Emmen	6	(0)
2019–2026	Hansa Rostock	184	(11)
- * Club domestic league appearances and goals as of 28 May 2026

Nico Neidhart (born 27 September 1994) is a German professional footballer who plays as a full back. He is the son of football manager Christian Neidhart.

Neidhart made his debut for VfL Osnabrück in August 2012, as a substitute for Marcus Piossek in a 3–0 away defeat to Stuttgarter Kickers.
