= Arne Barez =

German sports figure (born 1978)

Arne Barez (born 31 April 1978) is a former German soccer player and now a coach and sports official.

== Career ==
=== As a Player ===
Barez played for several years in the under-class after his training at FC St. Pauli. In 1997, the midfielder was a player for the second men's team and even played with the professionals in the Bundesliga once. Between 2001 and 2006 he studied abroad in the United States. He earned degrees in business administration and sport management and was a member of the University of Wisconsin–Parkside's college soccer team from 2001 to 2004. In the US, he also played in California in Pacific Grove. In 2006 Barez switched from the Salinas Valley Samba team to the German top division team SpVgg Emsdetten 05. In Germany, Barez last played for SC Preußen Münster, where he ended his active career.

=== As trainer and sports official ===
Subsequently, Barez continued to work in Münster. Starting in 2012, he was the head of the club's internal youth department and took over his first team as coach of the B-youth team. Barez successfully completed his football teacher training course at the Hennes Weisweiler Academy in Cologne along with 23 other graduates.

For the 2019–20 season he took over the club's A-youth full-time and was integrated as a recruiting assistant for the coaching team of the 3. Liga men's team led by Sven Hübscher. After completing 17 games, Barez temporarily took over Hübscher's round. Barez entered the winter break with Münster as second last in the table, during which he was replaced by Sascha Hildmann. At the end of October 2020, his work in Münster ended, and he took up a position in FIFA's talent development program after having previously worked in an advisory capacity for FIFA.

== Other ==
Barez has been the Editor-in-Chief of the Fußballtraining magazine since 2006.
