= Daniel Thioune =

German football manager (born 1974)

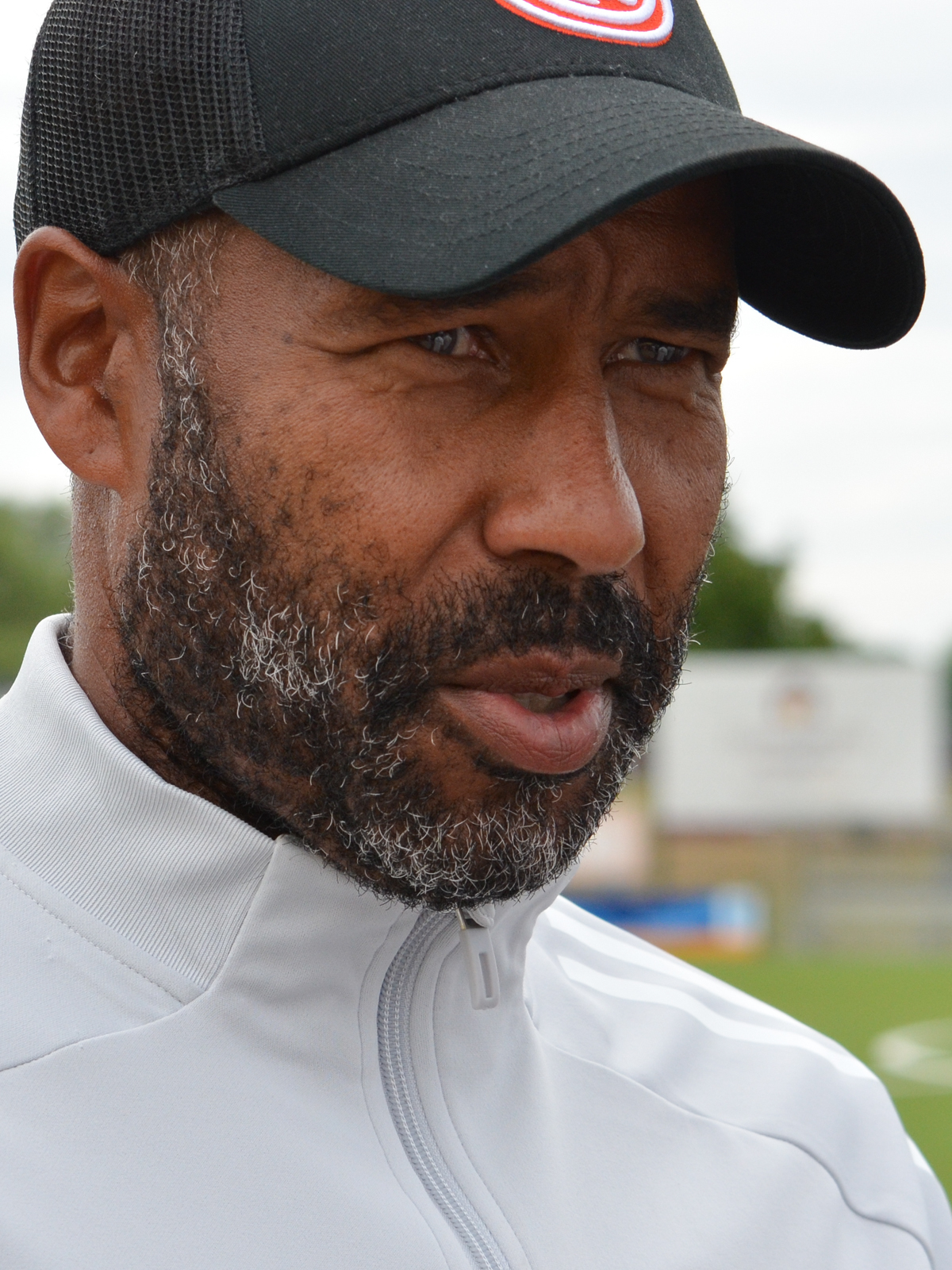
- Thioune in 2025

Personal information
- Full name: Daniel Moustapha Thioune
- Date of birth: 21 July 1974 (age 52)
- Place of birth: Georgsmarienhütte, West Germany
- Height: 1.80 m (5 ft 11 in)
- Position: Midfielder

Team information
- Current team: Werder Bremen (manager)

Youth career
- 1980–1987: Raspo Osnabrück
- 1987–1988: Osnabrücker SC
- 1988–1989: Raspo Osnabrück
- 1989–1992: Post SV Osnabrück

Senior career*
Years	Team	Apps	(Gls)
1992–1994	Post SV Osnabrück		
1994–1996	Sportfreunde Oesede		
1996–2002	VfL Osnabrück	161	(61)
2002–2004	VfB Lübeck	47	(8)
2004–2010	LR / Rot Weiss Ahlen	112	(13)

Managerial career
- 2017–2020: VfL Osnabrück
- 2020–2021: Hamburger SV
- 2022–2025: Fortuna Düsseldorf
- 2026–: Werder Bremen
- * Club domestic league appearances and goals

Daniel Moustapha Thioune (born 21 July 1974) is a German professional football manager and former player who currently serves as head coach of Werder Bremen. Thioune spent most of his playing career at VfL Osnabrück, where he established himself as a prolific scorer from midfield. Upon retiring in 2010 after playing for multiple lower league sides, he began coaching different teams in the VfL Osnabrück academy before being appointed as the first team coach in 2017. He was hired as Hamburger SV head coach in 2020, and has also been the manager of Fortuna Düsseldorf.

== Playing career ==
Thioune started playing for local club Raspo Osnabrück at the age of six, living across their home ground and training facilities. As a junior player, he would also play for Osnabrücker SC and Post SV Osnabrück.

After two years of senior football playing for Post SV Osnabrück, Thioune moved to Sportfreunde Oesede in 1994, who were playing in the fifth-tier Oberliga Niedersachsen at the time. Prior to the 1996–97 season he was signed by third tier Regionalliga club VfL Osnabrück, with whom he won promotion to the 2. Bundesliga in 2000. There, he made his professional debut in the 2000–01 season and scored 10 goals in 22 appearances. After the club's relegation in 2001, Thioune initially stayed with the club, but moved to 2. Bundesliga side VfB Lübeck in 2002, for whom he played 47 league games in two years and scored eight goals. In the 2003–04 season, he reached the semi-finals of the DFB-Pokal with Lübeck under head coach Dieter Hecking, in which the team was eliminated after leading twice in extra time against the eventual Double winners from Werder Bremen.

Ahead of the 2004–05 season, Thioune moved to 2. Bundesliga side LR Ahlen (Rot Weiss Ahlen from 2006). With the club he suffered relegation to the Regionalliga for the second time in his career, in 2006. As team captain, however, he won promotion to the 2. Bundesliga in the 2007–08 season after being down for two years. After a serious injury, Thioune stepped down as captain in January 2010 and retired from professional football on 15 April 2010.

Thioune made 126-second-tier and 192 third-tier appearances during his career, in which he scored 24 goals in the 2. Bundesliga and 60 goals in the Regionalliga. After finishing his professional career, he would play alongside former German international Ronald Maul at Eintracht Osnabrück for a while.

== Managerial career ==
=== Beginnings ===
Thioune started out in management in the 2010–11 season, where he functioned as Arie van Lent's assistant at 3. Liga club Rot Weiss Ahlen, but was released from his duties after the club faced bankruptcy in June 2011. In the 2011–12 season, he moved to a position as scout for Rot-Weiß Erfurt.

From the 2013–14 season, Thioune coached the B1 Jugend (U17) of VfL Osnabrück and led them to promotion to the B-Junioren Bundesliga (Under 17 Bundesliga) from the North/Northeast group in 2015. When Joe Enochs succeeded Maik Walpurgis as head coach of the VfL Osnabrück senior team in 2015, Thioune took over Enochs' position as the head of the youth academy and became head coach of the A-Junioren (U19). Under his leadership, the U19 managed to get promoted from the A-Jugend-Regionalliga Nord to the A-Junioren Bundesliga (Under 19 Bundesliga) from the North/Northeast group in 2016. In March 2016, Thioune received his coaching license, after taking courses at the Hennes-Weisweiler Academy together with the likes of Julian Nagelsmann, Alexander Nouri and Domenico Tedesco.

=== VfL Osnabrück ===
After a poor start to the 2017–18 season, Joe Enochs was relieved of his duties as head coach of the VfL Osnabrück senior team competing in the 3. Liga, in early October 2017. Thioune initially took over as an caretaker manager, but in early November 2017, he was appointed the permanent head coach. Thioune managed to turn around the team and eventually reach the 17th place in the league standings with 6 points down to the relegations spots. In the 2018–19 season, he led VfL Osnabrück to the 3. Liga championship and thus to promotion to the 2. Bundesliga. In September 2019, his contract with the club was extended to June 2021. In the 2019–20 season, Thioune's side held 5th place in the league table after the first half of the season with 26 points; only four points behind a direct promotion spot. In the second half of the season, the team from Osnabrück finished as the worst team of the league with a mere 14 points, which in the end resulted in a relegation battle. Another season in the 2. Bundesliga was only secured on the 33rd matchday, and VfL finished the season as the best promotee with 40 points and a 13th place finish.

=== Hamburger SV ===
For the 2020–21 season, Thioune took over the 2. Bundesliga side of Hamburger SV, which had previously missed out on promotion to the Bundesliga for two consecutive seasons in fourth place. He succeeded Dieter Hecking, whose contract had expired and under whom he had played at VfB Lübeck. Thioune triggered a release clause in his contract at VfL Osnabrück to sign a two-year contract in Hamburg.

Thioune was sacked on 3 May 2021, three matchdays before end of season.

=== Fortuna Düsseldorf ===
On 8 February 2022, Thioune was hired by Fortuna Düsseldorf, replacing Christian Preußer. He signed a contract until 2023. He was sacked in October 2025.

=== Werder Bremen ===
In February 2026, he was named the new head coach of Werder Bremen.

== Personal life ==
Thioune was born in Germany to a Senegalese father and German mother, and holds dual citizenship. He is the first black professional football manager in Germany. As a youngster he attended the Graf-Stauffenberg High School in Osnabrück. Thioune studied sports and pedagogy at the University of Vechta and graduated in 2019 with a bachelor's degree. He is married and has a daughter and a son.

== Managerial statistics ==
As of 22 November 2026

Managerial record by team and tenure
Team	From	To	Record								Ref
Team	From	To	G	W	D	L	GF	GA	GD	Win %	Ref
VfL Osnabrück	5 October 2017	6 July 2020	105	39	33	33	152	135	+17	37.14	
Hamburger SV	6 July 2020	3 May 2021	33	15	10	8	66	45	+21	45.45	
Fortuna Düsseldorf	8 February 2022	5 October 2025	135	65	36	34	247	182	+65	48.15	
Werder Bremen	4 February 2026	Present	26	10	4	12	41	40	+1	38.46	
Total			299	129	83	87	506	402	+104	43.14	—

== Honours ==
=== Player ===
VfL Osnabrück

- Regionalliga Nord: 1999–2000

Rot Weiss Ahlen

- Regionalliga Nord: 2007–08

=== Manager ===
VfL Osnabrück

- 3. Liga: 2018–19

Individual

- 3. Liga Manager of the Season: 2018–19
