= İsmail Atalan =

German-Turkish football manager

Personal information
- Date of birth: 1 April 1980 (age 46)
- Place of birth: Midyat, Turkey
- Position: Forward

Youth career
- 1988–: TSG Dülmen
- –1999: SC Preußen Münster

Senior career*
Years	Team	Apps	(Gls)
1999–	SC Preußen Münster II		
- 1. FC Gievenbeck
–2010	1. FC Gievenbeck II		
2010–2012	SV Davaria Davensberg		

Managerial career
- 2008–2010: 1. FC Gievenbeck II (player-manager)
- 2010–2012: SV Davaria Davensberg (player-manager)
- 2012–2014: SC Roland Beckum
- 2014–2017: Sportfreunde Lotte
- 2017: VfL Bochum
- 2019–2020: Sportfreunde Lotte
- 2020: Hallescher FC
- 2023: Alanyaspor (assistant)
- 2024: Gostivar
- 2024–2025: Kapfenberger SV
- 2025–2026: Wolfsberger AC
- * Club domestic league appearances and goals

İsmail Atalan (born 1 April 1980) is a Turkish football manager of Yezidi descent.

== Coaching career ==
Atalan started his managerial career in 2008 as a player-manager for the reserve team of the 1. FC Gievenbeck. In 2012, he became manager of Davaria Davensberg, where he coached until 2014. In November 2014, Atalan became head coach of Sportfreunde Lotte. In 2016, he led them to promotion to the 3. Liga.

In July 2017, Atalan was due to begin a three-day internship under Pep Guardiola at Manchester City, but it did not take place after VfL Bochum appointed him as manager on 11 July. He became the new manager of VfL Bochum on 11 July 2017. He returned to Lotte on 9 April 2019. He moved to Hallescher FC on 25 February 2020. He was sacked on 8 June 2020. In April 2023, he became assistant manager of Alanyaspor in Turkey.

From May 2024 to July 2025, Atalan served as the head coach of the Austrian club Kapfenberger SV.

In Novemerb 2025, he became new manager of Wolfsberger AC.

== Honours ==
=== Manager ===
Individual

- 3. Liga Manager of the Season: 2016–17

== See also ==
- List of Yezidi people
- Yezidism in Turkey
