= Patrick Glöckner =

German footballer and manager

Personal information
- Date of birth: 18 November 1976 (age 49)
- Place of birth: Maintal, West Germany
- Height: 1.85 m (6 ft 1 in)
- Position: Midfielder

Youth career
- 1982–1990: FSV Bischofsheim
- 1990–1995: Eintracht Frankfurt

Senior career*
Years	Team	Apps	(Gls)
1995–1997	Eintracht Frankfurt	9	(0)
1995–1996	→ Eintracht Frankfurt II	15	(0)
1997–1998	Stuttgarter Kickers	5	(0)
1997–1998	→ Stuttgarter Kickers II	17	(2)
2000–2001	Kickers Offenbach	14	(0)
2002–2003	FSV Frankfurt	11	(2)
Total		71	(4)

Managerial career
- 2007–2008: Frankfurt II
- 2018–2019: Viktoria Köln
- 2019–2020: Chemnitzer FC
- 2020–2022: Waldhof Mannheim
- 2022–2023: Hansa Rostock
- 2025: 1860 Munich
- * Club domestic league appearances and goals

Patrick Glöckner (born 18 November 1976) is a German professional football manager and former player who was most recently the head coach of 1860 Munich.

== Playing career ==
As a player, he played as a midfielder in the 2. Bundesliga with Eintracht Frankfurt and Stuttgarter Kickers, and also for Kickers Offenbach and FSV Frankfurt.

== Managerial career ==
Having previously held the role of assistant manager at Eintracht Frankfurt II, FC St. Pauli and Viktoria Köln, he became the permanent manager at Viktoria Köln in the summer of 2019. He left the club on 13 May 2019, one game prior to the end of the season with Köln top of the table, and was appointed as the manager of 3. Liga side Chemnitzer FC in September 2019. His Chemnitz side were relegated to the Regionalliga in his first season at the club. He moved to Waldhof Mannheim for the 2020–21 season. He left Mannheim in May 2022. In November 2022, he was appointed as the new head coach of Hansa Rostock. On 20 March 2023, Patrick was relieved of his duties as Hansa Rostock manager with immediate effect.

On 20 January 2025, he was appointed as the new head coach of 1860 Munich. On 28 September 2025 after a series of poor results he was sacked.
