= Uwe Ehlers =

German footballer

Personal information
- Date of birth: 8 March 1975 (age 51)
- Place of birth: Rostock, East Germany
- Height: 1.87 m (6 ft 2 in)
- Position: Defender

Senior career*
Years	Team	Apps	(Gls)
1993–2000	Hansa Rostock	116	(5)
2000–2003	1860 Munich	42	(0)
2003–2004	FC Augsburg	40	(2)
2005–2007	Erzgebirge Aue	41	(2)
2007–2009	VfL Osnabrück	5	(0)
2009–2012	Hansa Rostock II	13	(1)
Total		257	(10)

Managerial career
- 2014: Hansa Rostock (interim)
- 2017: Hansa Rostock
- * Club domestic league appearances and goals

Uwe Ehlers (born 8 March 1975) is a German former professional footballer who played as a defender. who is assistant head coach of Hansa Rostock.
