= David Bergner =

German football manager

Personal information
- Date of birth: 2 December 1973 (age 52)
- Place of birth: East Berlin, East Germany
- Height: 1.96 m (6 ft 5 in)
- Position: Defender

Senior career*
| Years | Team | Apps | (Gls) |
| 1994–1999 | Union Berlin | | |
| 1999–2000 | Sachsen Leipzig | | |
| 2000–2002 | 1. FC Nürnberg | 6 | (0) |
| 2002 | 1. FC Schweinfurt 05 | 5 | (0) |
| 2002–2005 | Sachsen Leipzig | 29 | (1) |
| 2005–2007 | Union Berlin | 45 | (2) |
| 2007–2010 | Hallescher FC | 19 | (1) |
| Total | | 104 | (4) |

Managerial career
- 2012–2015: Dynamo Dresden (youth)
- 2017: Rot-Weiß Erfurt
- 2018–2019: Chemnitzer FC
- 2021–2022: Lithuania (assistant manager)
- 2022–: FC Teutonia Ottensen
- * Club domestic league appearances and goals

David Bergner is a German football manager and former player who manages FC Teutonia Ottensen of the Regionalliga Nord. He previously managed the youth team of Dynamo Dresden, FC Rot-Weiß Erfurt, and Chemnitzer FC. As a player, he played for 1. FC Union Berlin, Sachsen Leipzig, 1. FC Nürnberg, 1. FC Schweinfurt 05 and Hallescher FC.
