= Christian Neidhart =

German footballer

Personal information
- Date of birth: 1 October 1968 (age 58)
- Place of birth: Braunschweig, West Germany
- Height: 1.83 m (6 ft 0 in)
- Position: Forward

Team information
- Current team: Kickers Offenbach (manager)

Youth career
- –1987: Eintracht Braunschweig

Senior career*
Years	Team	Apps	(Gls)
1987–1988	Eintracht Braunschweig	1	(0)
1988	Wacker 04 Berlin	0	(0)
1988–1992	VfL Osnabrück	67	(10)
1991–1992	→ FC Sachsen Leipzig (loan)	12	(2)
1992–1995	Flensburg 08		
1995–1996	TSV Nord Harrislee		
1996–1998	BV Cloppenburg		
1998	Chengdu Blades		
1998–1999	BV Cloppenburg	16	(1)
1999–2000	SV Holdorf		
2000–2001	SV Sparta Werlte		
2001–2002	VfB Oldenburg	8	(0)
2002–2005	Hansa Friesoythe		

Managerial career
- 2001–2002: VfB Oldenburg (player-manager)
- 2011–2013: SV Wilhelmshaven
- 2013–2020: SV Meppen
- 2020–2022: Rot-Weiss Essen
- 2022–2023: Waldhof Mannheim
- 2023–2025: Kickers Offenbach
- 2025–: Blau-Weiß Lohne
- * Club domestic league appearances and goals

Christian Neidhart (born 1 October 1968) is a German football manager and former player who is the manager of Kickers Offenbach. He is the father of fellow footballer Nico Neidhart.

== Managerial statistics ==
As of match played 17 March 2024

Managerial record by team and tenure
Team	From	To	Record								Ref
Team	From	To	G	W	D	L	GF	GA	GD	Win %	Ref
SV Wilhelmshaven	1 July 2011	30 June 2013	65	21	13	31	92	115	−23	32.31	
SV Meppen	1 July 2013	16 July 2020	270	123	69	78	441	346	+95	45.56	
Rot-Weiss Essen	16 July 2020	5 May 2022	89	62	18	9	217	75	+142	69.66	
Waldhof Mannheim	1 July 2022	28 May 2023	43	22	3	18	80	71	+9	51.16	
Kickers Offenbach	1 July 2023	Present	25	10	6	9	43	32	+11	40.00	
Total			492	238	109	145	873	639	+234	48.37	—
