= Stefan Emmerling =

German footballer (born 1966)

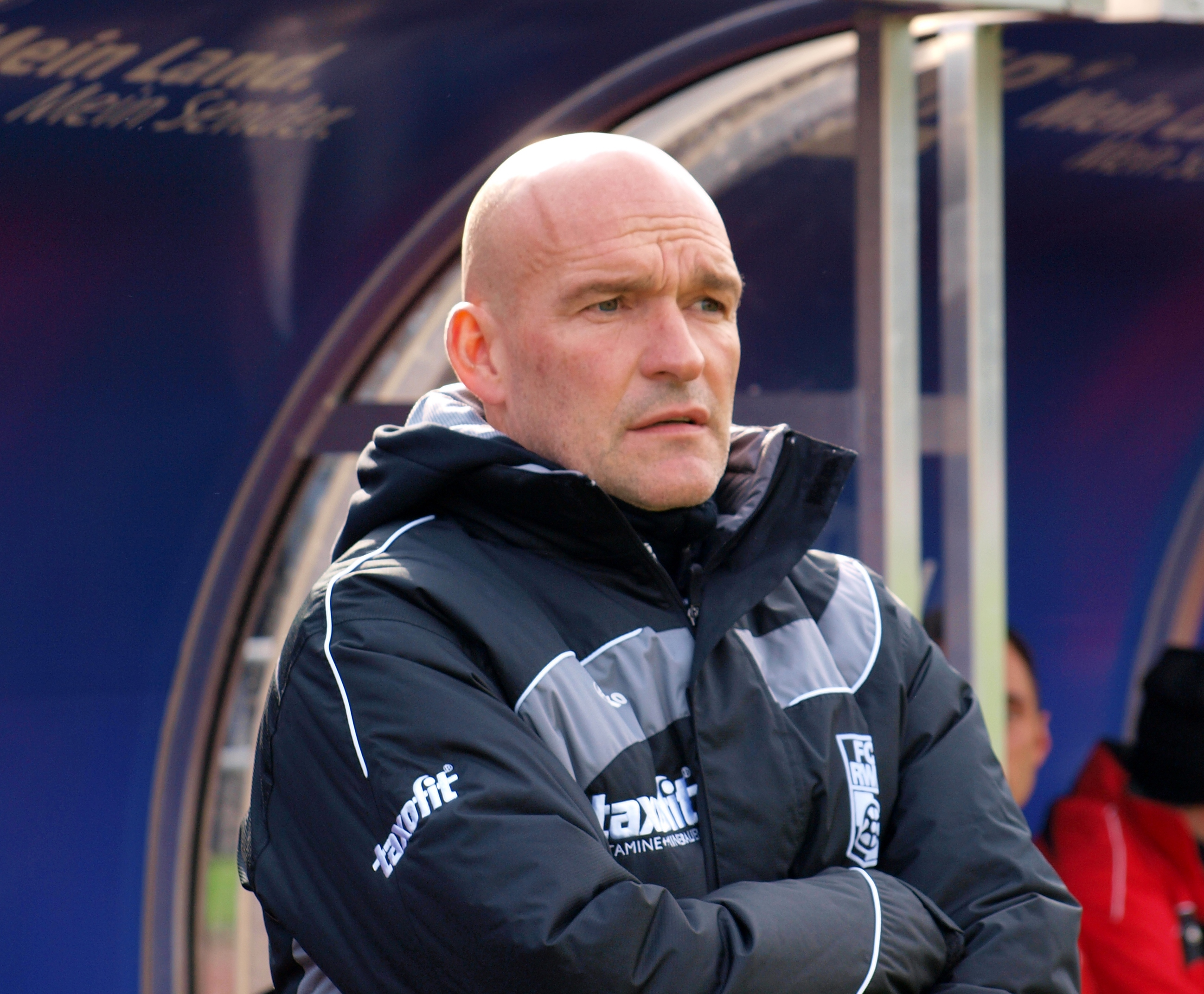
- Emmerling in 2010

Personal information
- Date of birth: 10 February 1966 (age 60)
- Place of birth: Meckesheim, West Germany
- Height: 1.78 m (5 ft 10 in)
- Position: Defender

Youth career
- TSV Meckesheim
- –1987: SV Sandhausen

Senior career*
| Years | Team | Apps | (Gls) |
| 1987–1989 | 1. FC Kaiserslautern | 28 | (1) |
| 1988–1993 | Wattenscheid 09 | 180 | (10) |
| 1994 | Hannover 96 | 14 | (0) |
| 1995–1999 | MSV Duisburg | 133 | (3) |
| 2000–2002 | Fortuna Düsseldorf | 21 | (3) |
| Total | | 376 | (17) |

Managerial career
- 2002: Fortuna Düsseldorf
- 2003–2007: Alemannia Aachen II
- 2007–2009: Kickers Emden
- 2009: Rot Weiss Ahlen
- 2010–2012: Rot-Weiß Erfurt
- 2013: Wormatia Worms
- 2016: 1. FC Köln II
- 2016–2017: SC Paderborn
- 2017–2018: Rot-Weiß Erfurt
- 2019–2026: Kickers Emden
- * Club domestic league appearances and goals

Stefan Emmerling (born 10 February 1966) is a German football manager and former player who manages.
