= Sascha Hildmann =

German football manager

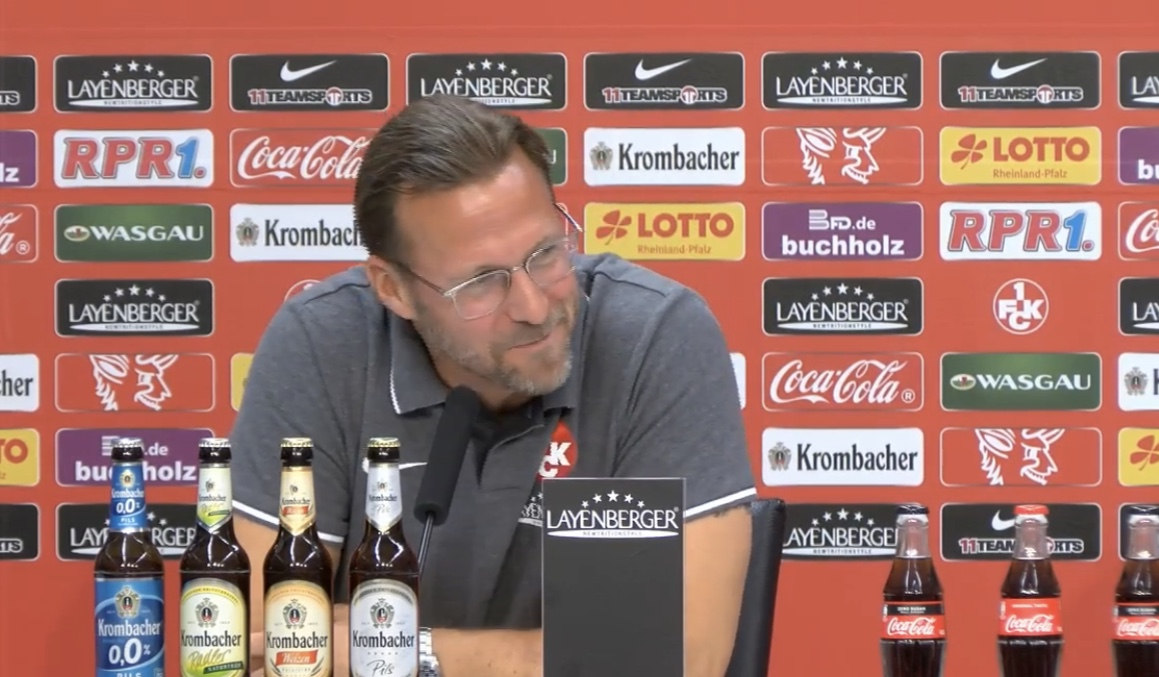
- Hildmann during his presentation at 1. FC Kaiserslautern in 2018

Personal information
- Date of birth: 7 April 1972 (age 54)
- Place of birth: Kaiserslautern, West Germany
- Height: 1.84 m (6 ft 0 in)
- Position: Defender

Team information
- Current team: Jahn Regensburg (manager)

Youth career
- –1985: SV Enkenbach
- 1985: 1. FC Kaiserslautern

Senior career*
Years	Team	Apps	(Gls)
–1995	1. FC Kaiserslautern II		
1994–1995	1. FC Kaiserslautern	0	(0)
1995	1. FC Saarbrücken	14	(1)
1996–2000	1. FC Kaiserslautern II	110	(6)
2000–2002	Alemannia Aachen	36	(1)
2002–2003	FK Pirmasens		
2003–2006	FC Homburg	69	(5)
2006–2011	SV Rodenbach		

Managerial career
- 2006–2011: SV Rodenbach (player-manager)
- 2011–2013: SC Idar-Oberstein
- 2013–2015: SC Hauenstein
- 2017–2018: Sonnenhof Großaspach
- 2018–2019: 1. FC Kaiserslautern
- 2019–2025: Preußen Münster
- 2026–: Jahn Regensburg
- * Club domestic league appearances and goals

Sascha Hildmann (born 7 April 1972) is a German football manager, who is managing SSV Jahn Regensburg since March 2026.

== Managerial career ==
In October 2018, Hildmann was released by Sonnenhof Großaspach.

On 6 December 2018, he was announced as the new manager of 1. FC Kaiserslautern. He was sacked on 16 September 2019.

He was hired by Preußen Münster on 27 December 2019. In April 2025, he was sacked. With a five-year tenure, he was the longest-serving coach in the club’s history.

On 31 March 2026 Hildmann was hired by third-division club SSV Jahn Regensburg and was given a contract until June 2028.

== Managerial statistics ==
As of 2 May 2026

Managerial record by team and tenure
Team	From	To	Record								Ref
Team	From	To	G	W	D	L	GF	GA	GD	Win %	Ref
SC Idar-Oberstein	1 July 2011	30 June 2013	72	17	23	32	79	119	−40	23.61	
SC Hauenstein	1 July 2013	19 April 2015	63	34	12	17	109	63	+46	53.97	
Sonnenhof Großaspach	1 June 2017	5 October 2018	56	18	19	19	78	76	+2	32.14	
1. FC Kaiserslautern	6 December 2018	16 September 2019	33	14	9	10	53	43	+10	42.42	
Preußen Münster	27 December 2019	27 April 2025	219	119	49	51	445	245	+200	54.34	
Jahn Regensburg	31 March 2026	Present	6	3	1	2	12	11	+1	50.00	
Career total			449	205	113	131	776	557	+219	45.66	—
