= Michael Schiele =

German footballer

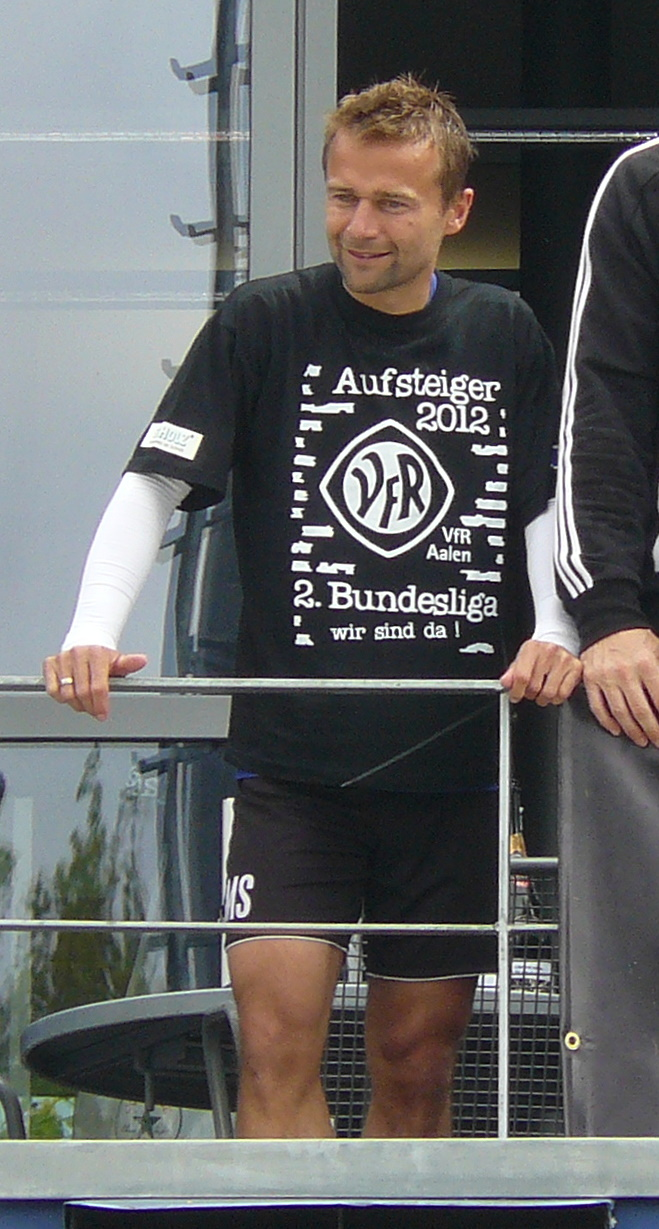
- Schiele with VfR Aalen in 2012

Personal information
- Date of birth: 3 March 1978 (age 48)
- Place of birth: Heidenheim an der Brenz, West Germany
- Height: 1.71 m (5 ft 7 in)
- Position: Midfielder

Youth career
- FC Dunstelkingen-Frickingen
- TSV Nördlingen

Senior career*
Years	Team	Apps	(Gls)
1997–2001	VfR Aalen	120	(4)
2001–2002	1. FC Schweinfurt	2	(0)
2002–2003	SV Sandhausen	32	(0)
2003–2010	VfR Aalen	137	(3)
Total		291	(7)

Managerial career
- 2017–2020: Würzburger Kickers
- 2020–2021: SV Sandhausen
- 2021–2023: Eintracht Braunschweig
- 2026–: Würzburger Kickers
- * Club domestic league appearances and goals

Michael Schiele (born 3 March 1978) is a German former footballer and manager who is currently managing Würzburger Kickers.

== Managerial statistics ==
As of match played 1 June 2026

Managerial record by team and tenure
Team	From	To	Record								Ref
Team	From	To	G	W	D	L	GF	GA	GD	Win %	Ref
Würzburger Kickers	2 October 2017	29 September 2020	120	59	26	35	215	155	+60	49.17	
SV Sandhausen	26 November 2020	15 February 2021	14	3	1	10	16	34	−18	21.43	
Eintracht Braunschweig	6 June 2021	4 July 2023	75	28	21	26	115	106	+9	37.33	
Würzburger Kickers	16 March 2026	Present	15	13	2	0	47	12	+35	86.67	
Total			224	103	50	71	393	307	+86	45.98	—
