= Rico Schmitt =

German former footballer (born 1968)

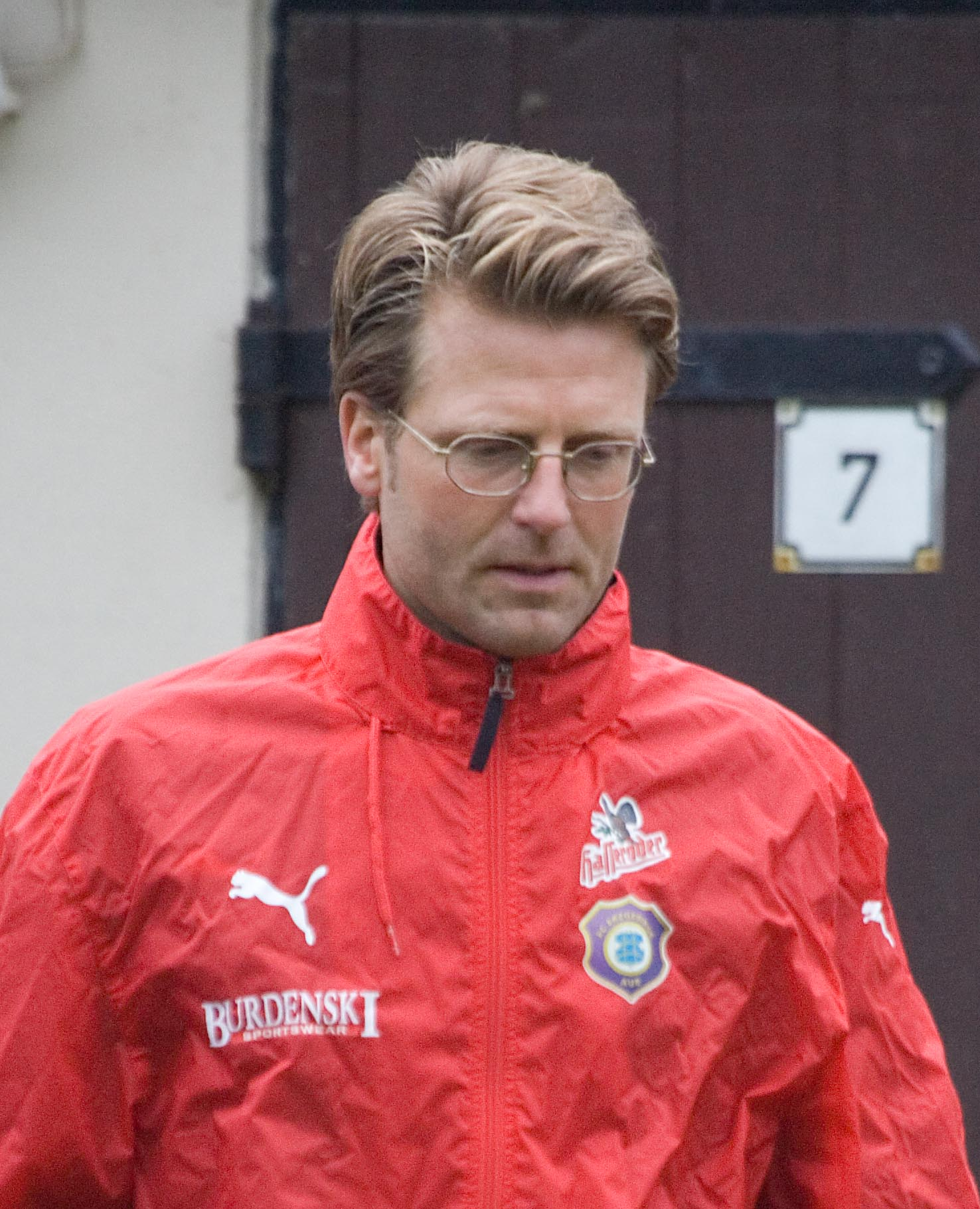
- Schmitt at practice with Ergebirge Aue in 2011

Personal information
- Date of birth: 27 September 1968 (age 58)
- Place of birth: Karl-Marx-Stadt, East Germany
- Height: 1.84 m (6 ft 0 in)
- Position: Goalkeeper

Youth career
- FC Karl-Marx-Stadt

Senior career*
Years	Team	Apps	(Gls)
1987–1988	FC Karl-Marx-Stadt II		
1988–1993	Greifswalder SC		
1993–1998	FSV 08 Grüna		

Managerial career
- 1999–2001: Altchemnitzer BSC
- 2001–2005: VfB Fortuna Chemnitz
- 2005–2008: Erzgebirge Aue II
- 2009–2012: Erzgebirge Aue
- 2013–2016: Kickers Offenbach
- 2016–2018: Hallescher FC
- 2019: VfR Aalen
- 2019–2020: Carl Zeiss Jena
- 2021–2022: SV Meppen
- 2023–2026: FSV Zwickau
- * Club domestic league appearances and goals

Rico Schmitt (born 27 September 1968) is a German football manager and former player, who is the manager.
