= Jens Härtel =

German footballer and manager (born 1969)

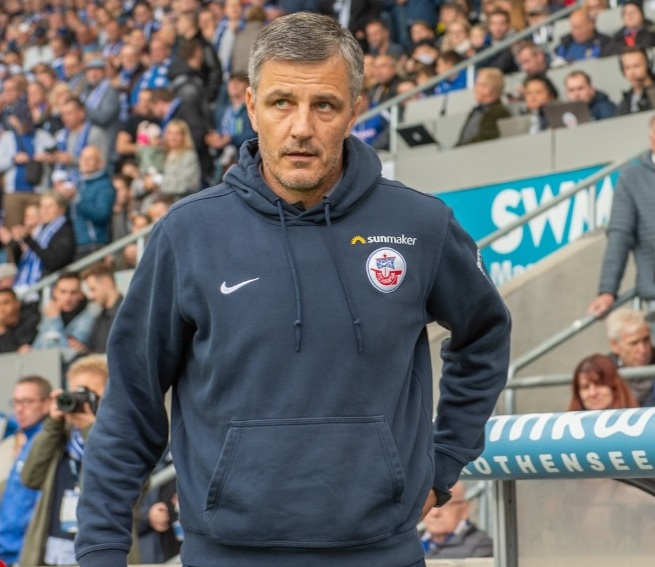
- Härtel with Hansa Rostock in 2019

Personal information
- Date of birth: 7 June 1969 (age 57)
- Place of birth: Rochlitz, East Germany
- Height: 1.85 m (6 ft 1 in)
- Position: Defender

Senior career*
| Years | Team | Apps | (Gls) |
| –1989 | 1. FC Lokomotive Leipzig | | |
| 1989–1990 | Chemie Böhlen | | |
| 1990–1993 | FC Sachsen Leipzig | | |
| 1993–1996 | Union Berlin | 93 | (12) |
| 1996–1998 | FSV Zwickau | 63 | (1) |
| 1998–2000 | Union Berlin | 65 | (14) |
| 2000–2001 | FC Sachsen Leipzig | 32 | (3) |
| 2001–2003 | SV Babelsberg 03 | 53 | (3) |
| 2003–2006 | SV Germania Schöneiche | | |

Managerial career
- 2005–2007: SV Germania Schöneiche
- 2011–2013: Berliner AK 07
- 2014–2018: 1. FC Magdeburg
- 2019–2022: Hansa Rostock
- 2023: Eintracht Braunschweig
- 2025–2026: Erzgebirge Aue
- * Club domestic league appearances and goals

Jens Härtel (born 7 June 1969) is a German professional football manager and former player

== Managerial statistics ==
As of match played on 8 October 2023

| Team | From | To | Record | | | | | | | | Ref |
| Team | From | To | G | W | D | L | GF | GA | GD | Win % | Ref |
|---|---|---|---|---|---|---|---|---|---|---|---|
| Berliner AK 07 | 1 July 2011 | 30 June 2013 | 66 | 28 | 19 | 19 | 89 | 68 | +21 | 42.42 | |
| 1. FC Magdeburg | 1 July 2014 | 12 November 2018 | 174 | 90 | 43 | 41 | 287 | 168 | +119 | 51.72 | |
| Hansa Rostock | 9 January 2019 | 6 November 2022 | 159 | 70 | 40 | 49 | 240 | 178 | +62 | 44.03 | |
| Eintracht Braunschweig | 11 June 2023 | 23 October 2023 | 11 | 1 | 2 | 8 | 7 | 21 | −14 | 9.09 | |
| Total | | | 410 | 189 | 104 | 117 | 623 | 435 | +188 | 46.10 | — |

== Honours ==
=== Manager ===
Individual

- 3. Liga Manager of the Season: 2017–18
