= Oliver Zapel =

German footballer and manager

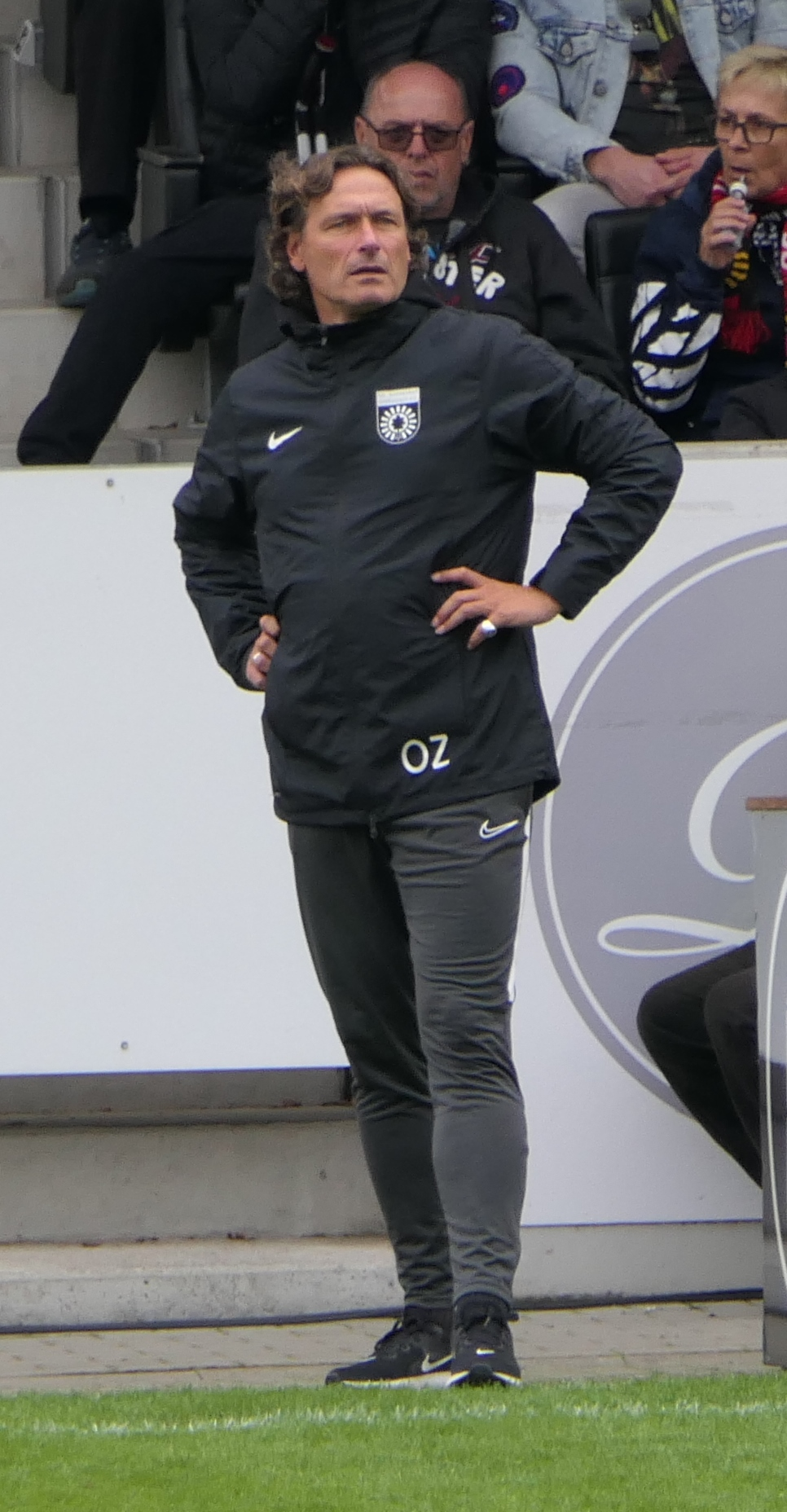
- Zapel in 2019

Personal information
- Date of birth: 15 January 1968 (age 58)
- Place of birth: Georgsmarienhütte, West Germany
- Position: Midfielder

Senior career*
| Years | Team | Apps | (Gls) |
| 1987–1990 | TuS Aumühle | | |
| 1990–1992 | Bergedorf 85 | | |
| 1992–1994 | SC Wentorf | | |
| 1994–1996 | Bergedorf 85 | | |
| 1996–2001 | TuS Hoisdorf | | |
| 2001–2002 | SC Concordia | | |
| 2002–2003 | Harburger TB | | |
| 2003–2004 | USC Paloma | | |
| 2004–2006 | FC St. Georg-Horn | | |
| 2006–2007 | TuS Hamburg | | |
| 2007–2008 | SC Concordia | | |

Managerial career
- 2002–2003: Harburger TB (player-manager)
- 2005–2006: FC St. Georg-Horn (player-manager)
- 2006–2007: TuS Hamburg (player-manager)
- 2009–2010: Rahlstedter SC
- 2010–2012: Barsbütteler SV
- 2012–2016: SV Eichede
- 2013: SV Eichede II (interim)
- 2016–2017: Sonnenhof Großaspach
- 2017–2018: Werder Bremen II
- 2019: Fortuna Köln
- 2019: Sonnenhof Großaspach
- 2022–2023: Phönix Lübeck
- * Club domestic league appearances and goals

Oliver Zapel (born 15 January 1968) is a German former footballer and manager, who was most recently the manager of Phönix Lübeck.

== Career ==
On 1 July 2016, Zapel became head coach of Sonnenhof Großaspach but resigned just a year later. He was appointed as the head coach of Werder Bremen II on 13 November 2017. He was sacked on 5 February 2018. On 22 April 2019, he was named the head coach of Fortuna Köln. In 2019, he moved back to Großaspach. He was sacked on 16 December 2019.

In January 2022 he returned to management as the manager of Phönix Lübeck. In June 2023 he resigned as manager for personal reasons.

== Personal life ==
Zapel is married and has two children. He lives in Brunstorf near Hamburg.
