= Uwe Koschinat =

German football coach (born 1971)

Personal information
- Date of birth: 1 September 1971 (age 55)
- Place of birth: Koblenz, West Germany
- Height: 1.78 m (5 ft 10 in)
- Position: Defender

Team information
- Current team: Rot-Weiss Essen (manager)

Senior career*
Years	Team	Apps	(Gls)
1990–1993	VfL Wolfsburg		
1993–2002	TuS Koblenz		
2002–2003	FV Engers		
2003–2004	TuS Koblenz	33	(0)

Managerial career
- 2009: TuS Koblenz (caretaker)
- 2011–2018: Fortuna Köln
- 2018–2020: SV Sandhausen
- 2021–2022: 1. FC Saarbrücken
- 2023: Arminia Bielefeld
- 2023–2024: VfL Osnabrück
- 2024–: Rot-Weiss Essen
- * Club domestic league appearances and goals

Uwe Koschinat (born 1 September 1971) is a German former footballer and current manager of Rot-Weiss Essen.

== Coaching career ==
Koschinat was an assistant coach at TuS Koblenz. He became the interim head coach for Koblenz on 17 December 2009. Petrik Sander became the next head coach on 27 December 2009. He lost his only match in–charge 1–0 to FSV Frankfurt. Koschinat became head coach of Fortuna Köln on 1 July 2011. He terminated his contract on 15 October 2018, to become the manager of SV Sandhausen. He was sacked on 24 November 2020. On 6 April 2021, 1. FC Saarbrücken announced that they hired Koschinat starting from the 2021–22 season. He left Saarbrücken in October 2022. In March 2023, he was appointed the new coach for Arminia Bielefeld. After Bielefeld was relegated to the 3. Liga, he left Bielefeld. He was signed by VfL Osnabrück in November 2023. In September 2024, he was sacked. He was hired by Rot-Weiss Essen in December 2024.

== Coaching career statistics ==
As of match played 19 May 2024

Team	From	To	Record					
Team	From	To	G	W	D	L	Win %	Ref.
TuS Koblenz (caretaker)	13 December 2009	26 December 2009	1	0	0	1	0.00	
Fortuna Köln	1 July 2011	15 October 2018	297	137	58	102	46.13	
SV Sandhausen	15 October 2018	24 November 2020	70	21	24	25	30.00	
1. FC Saarbrücken	1 July 2021	10 October 2022	50	20	16	14	40.00	
Arminia Bielefeld	9 March 2023	9 June 2023	13	3	4	6	23.08	
VfL Osnabrück	27 November 2023	22 September 2024	28	7	8	13	25.00	
Total			459	188	110	161	40.96	—
