= Torsten Ziegner =

German footballer (born 1977)

Personal information
- Date of birth: 9 November 1977 (age 48)
- Place of birth: Neuhaus am Rennweg, East Germany
- Height: 1.75 m (5 ft 9 in)
- Position: Midfielder

Youth career
- 1988–1991: BSG Mikroelektronik Neuhaus
- 1991–1995: Carl Zeiss Jena

Senior career*
| Years | Team | Apps | (Gls) |
| 1995–1998 | Carl Zeiss Jena | 21 | (0) |
| 1998–2000 | FSV Zwickau | 48 | (4) |
| 2000–2001 | Stuttgarter Kickers | 37 | (0) |
| 2001–2003 | Rot-Weiß Erfurt | 69 | (9) |
| 2003–2004 | Mainz 05 II | 30 | (3) |
| 2004–2011 | Carl Zeiss Jena | 161 | (24) |
| 2011–2012 | FSV Zwickau | 24 | (5) |
| Total | | 390 | (45) |

Managerial career
- 2012–2018: FSV Zwickau
- 2018–2020: Hallescher FC
- 2021: Würzburger Kickers
- 2022–2023: MSV Duisburg
- 2026–: 1. FC Lokomotive Leipzig
- * Club domestic league appearances and goals

Torsten Ziegner (born 9 November 1977) is a German former footballer who played as a midfielder.

== Career ==
Ziegner began his career with Carl Zeiss Jena, joining the club from amateur club BSG Mikroelektronik Neuhaus at aged 13. He was part of a successful Jena youth team alongside Robert Enke and Mario Kanopa and was capped by the Germany youth team. He made his first-team debut in September 1995 in a 2. Bundesliga match, and made a further twenty appearances over the following three seasons, leaving the club in 1998 after they'd been relegated to the Regionalliga Nordost.

Ziegner, along with Jena team-mates Heiko Cramer and Frank Nierlich, joined FSV Zwickau, who had been relegated to the same level. Zwickau finished in fourth place in Ziegner's first season, but started the following season badly: the Regionalliga was being restructured, and only the top seven teams would avoid relegation. Zwickau's poor start to the season made this almost impossible, and so there was a mass exodus of players during the season – Ziegner was one of the players to leave, returning to the 2. Bundesliga to sign for Stuttgarter Kickers. Zwickau finished the season bottom of the table.

Ziegner spent eighteen months at Kickers, the highlight being a DFB-Pokal tie in which they took Bundesliga side Werder Bremen to extra time, before losing 2–1. The following season ended in relegation, though, so in July 2001 Ziegner returned to his native Thuringia, signing for Rot-Weiß Erfurt of the Regionalliga Süd. After two successful seasons with Erfurt, he signed for second division side FSV Mainz 05, but didn't make a first-team appearance in his year with the club, mainly playing for the reserve team. At the end of the 2003–04 season, he left Mainz to return to Carl Zeiss Jena, who were by now in the fourth-tier NOFV-Oberliga Süd.

Ziegner missed just one game in the 2004–05 season, scoring nine goals as Jena won the division, and beat MSV Neuruppin in the playoff to earn promotion to the Regionalliga Nord. Another promotion followed immediately: Ziegner scored eight goals in 31 appearances as Jena finished second, behind Rot-Weiss Essen, returning to the 2. Bundesliga after an eight-year absence. An injury in an August match against 1. FC Köln caused Ziegner to miss much of the 2006–07 season, and the following year his 24 appearances couldn't prevent the club being relegated back to the third tier, now in the form of a national 3. Liga. He played a further three years for the club at this level, but was dropped from the team near the end of the 2010–11 season, and left the club in June 2011. He joined FSV Zwickau for a second spell, helping them win the NOFV-Oberliga Süd title, and promotion to the revived Regionalliga Nordost. Ziegner retired his player career at the end of the 2011–12 season.

== Coaching career ==
After retiring his player career, Ziegner was appointed as Zwickau's manager. He was sacked after coaching a total 213 games in six seasons on 25 April 2018.

He signed for the 2018–19 with Hallescher FC. On 24 February 2020, he was sacked.

On 24 May 2021, he was named head coach of Würzburger Kickers, starting with the 2021–22 season. He was sacked after just four months, on 4 October 2021.

In May 2022, with two matches to go, he took over the reign of MSV Duisburg. He was sacked in September 2023.

For the season 2026/27, he became the coach of the Regionalliga side 1. FC Lokomotive Leipzig.

== Ban ==
Ziegner was given a five-match ban in October 2008 for racially abusing Nigerian player Kingsley Onuegbu during a match against Eintracht Braunschweig.

== Managerial statistics ==
As of match played 15 September 2023

Managerial record by team and tenure
| Team | From | To | Record | | | | | | | | Ref |
| Team | From | To | G | W | D | L | GF | GA | GD | Win % | Ref |
|---|---|---|---|---|---|---|---|---|---|---|---|
| FSV Zwickau | 1 July 2012 | 25 April 2018 | 213 | 102 | 55 | 56 | 317 | 221 | +96 | 47.89 | |
| Hallescher FC | 1 July 2018 | 24 February 2020 | 68 | 31 | 14 | 23 | 104 | 83 | +21 | 45.59 | |
| Würzburger Kickers | 1 July 2021 | 4 October 2021 | 15 | 4 | 4 | 7 | 20 | 17 | +3 | 26.67 | |
| MSV Duisburg | 4 May 2022 | 16 September 2023 | 48 | 13 | 17 | 18 | 71 | 72 | −1 | 27.08 | |
| 1. FC Lokomotive Leipzig | 1 July 2026 | | 0 | 0 | 0 | 0 | 0 | 0 | +0 | — | |
| Career total | | | 344 | 150 | 90 | 104 | 512 | 393 | +119 | 43.60 | — |
