= Joe Enochs =

American soccer player

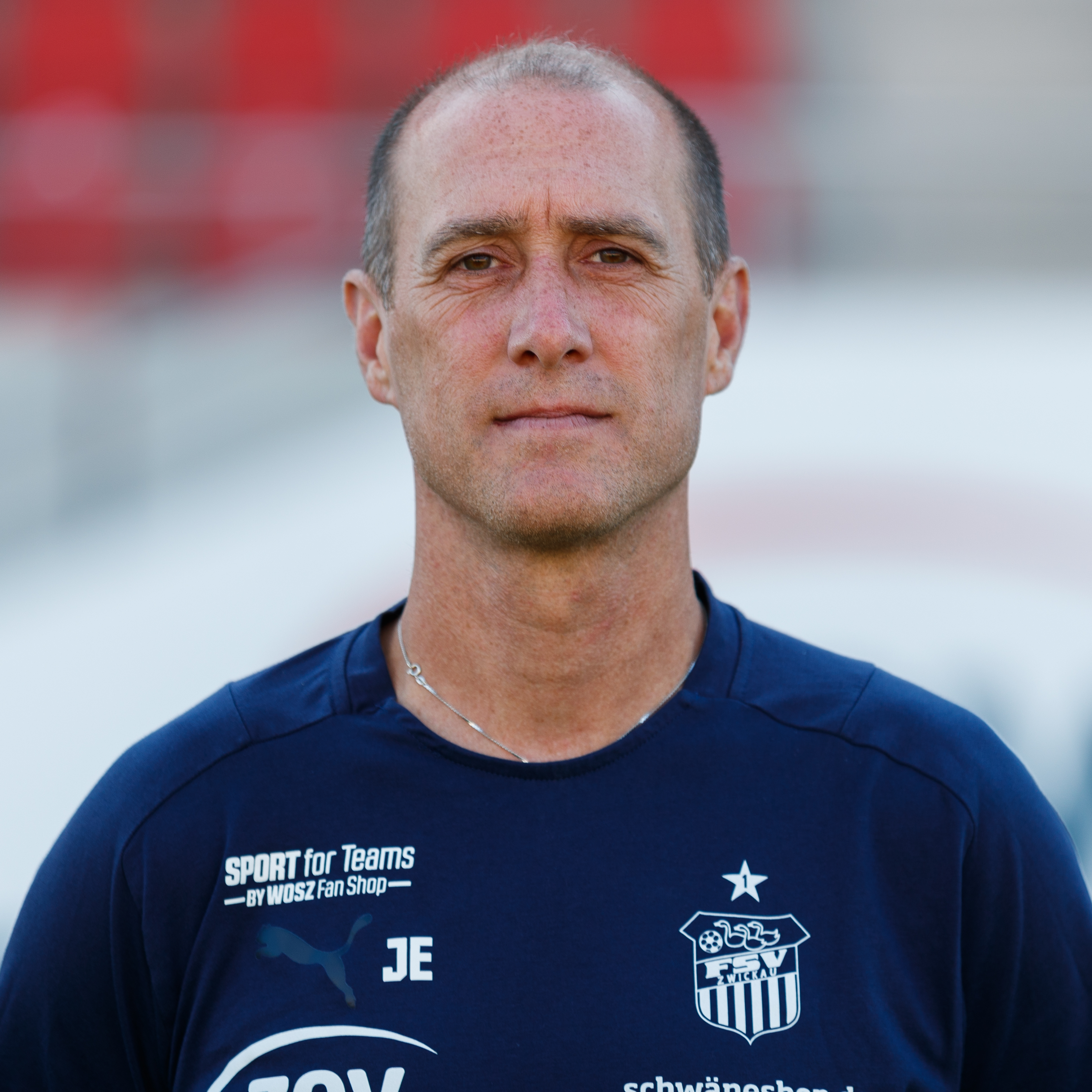
- Enochs in 2021

Personal information
- Full name: Joseph Andrew Enochs
- Date of birth: September 1, 1971 (age 55)
- Place of birth: Petaluma, California, United States
- Height: 6 ft 0 in (1.83 m)
- Position: Midfielder

Youth career
- 1989–1992: Sacramento State Hornets

Senior career*
Years	Team	Apps	(Gls)
1993–1994	San Francisco United All Blacks		
1994–1996	FC St. Pauli	0	(0)
1995–1996	→ FC St. Pauli II	34	(1)
1996–2008	VfL Osnabrück	359	(10)

International career
2001	United States	1	(0)

Managerial career
- 2008–2011: VfL Osnabrück II
- 2011: VfL Osnabrück (caretaker)
- 2011–2014: VfL Osnabrück II
- 2015–2017: VfL Osnabrück
- 2018–2023: FSV Zwickau
- 2023–2024: Jahn Regensburg
- * Club domestic league appearances and goals

Joseph Andrew Enochs (born September 1, 1971) is an American soccer coach and former professional player who spent the majority of his career at German club VfL Osnabrück.

He began his professional career with the San Francisco United All Blacks before moving to Germany to sign with FC St. Pauli. He never played for the first team and moved to Osnabrück in 1996. Enochs earned one cap with the United States national team in 2001.

== College ==
Enochs attended California State University, Sacramento, where he played soccer from 1989 to 1992. He finished his four years at Sac State with nine goals and fifteen assists in 71 games.

== Club career ==
=== All Blacks ===
After finishing his career with Sac State, Enochs signed with the U.S. Third Division (USISL) San Francisco United All Blacks and played until the summer of 1994.

=== St. Pauli ===
In 1994, Enochs received a phone call from a former Sac State teammate Mark Baena. Baena was playing in Germany and was looking for a roommate. Enochs decided to take Baena up on his offer and moved to Germany. Enochs later explained, "I was going to come home after the first year [in Germany], but I was having too much fun." In 1994, Enochs signed with St. Pauli. The team placed him with its Fourth Division amateur farm team. The next season, Enochs and his team mates had moved to the third-tier Regionalliga Nord for the 1995–96 season where he played in 34 games, scoring one goal.

In the spring of 1996 he trialled with Norwegian Eliteserien club Stabæk, facilitated by former St. Pauli player Andreas Mayer.

He performed well enough that he was offered a position on St. Pauli's first team, but he decided to move to third-tier club VfL Osnabrück in 1996.

=== Osnabrück ===
Enochs quickly established himself at Osnabrück, seeing time in 30 games in the 1996–97 season. He never played less than 39 games a season as he was selected as team co-captain. In 2000, Osnabrück earned promotion to the Second Division, but was back in the third tier the next season. The team won promotion again in 2003 and again in 2007, this time in the last game of the season. Enochs broke the club record for games played on May 19, 2007. In June 2007, he signed a one-year extension to his contract.

Enochs won the "Goal of the Month" award of German television network ARD's Sportschau in September 2004 for his strike against eventual cup winners Bayern Munich in the second round of the 2004–05 DFB-Pokal.

At the beginning of the 2007–08 season, his club opened a special section for children on the West stand of the stadium, that is named after Enochs. He retired at the end of the 2007–08 season.

== International career ==
Enochs earned his only cap with the U.S. national team in a June 7, 2001, scoreless tie with Ecuador. Enochs came on for Tony Sanneh in the sixty-second minute. He left the game in the ninety-first minute after suffering a gash to his forehead during a collision. Richie Williams came on for him.

== Managerial career ==
For the 2018–19 season he was signed as the head coach of FSV Zwickau. In February 2023, he was sacked. In May 2023, he was signed by Jahn Regensburg. In October 2024, he was sacked.

== Personal life ==
Enochs met his wife, Gunilla, a few months after he arrived in Germany through a blind date. That led to marriage and the birth of his daughter, Emily.

Enochs is the uncle of American baseball player Spencer Enochs Torkelson.

In 2008, Enochs opened a bar in the historic part of Osnabrück.

== Managerial statistics ==
As of October 25, 2024

Managerial record by team and tenure
Team	From	To	Record								Ref
Team	From	To	G	W	D	L	GF	GA	GD	Win %	Ref
VfL Osnabrück II	July 1, 2008	March 22, 2011	93	39	25	29	154	123	+31	41.94	
VfL Osnabrück (caretaker)	March 22, 2011	April 11, 2011	2	0	2	0	2	2	+0	0.00	
VfL Osnabrück II	July 1, 2011	June 30, 2014	90	39	24	27	179	118	+61	43.33	
VfL Osnabrück	August 23, 2015	October 4, 2017	92	39	26	27	124	104	+20	42.39	
FSV Zwickau	July 1, 2018	February 6, 2023	187	66	53	68	278	242	+36	35.29	
Jahn Regensburg	May 10, 2023	October 27, 2024	58	23	14	21	84	96	−12	39.66	
Total			522	206	144	172	821	685	+136	39.46	—
