= 2017–18 SV Meppen season =

SV Meppen
2017–18 season
- Chairman: Andreas Kremer
- Manager: Christian Neidhart
- Stadium: Hänsch-Arena
- 3. Liga: 7th
- Lower Saxony Cup: Qualification round
- Top goalscorer: Benjamin Girth (12 goals)
Home colours	Away colours
- All statistics correct as of 10 February 2018.

The 2017–18 SV Meppen season is the 106th season in the football club's history and 1st season in the 3. Liga, the third tier of German football, having been promoted from the Regionalliga Nord in 2017. In addition to the domestic league, SV Meppen also participated in this season's edition of the Lower Saxony Cup, the regional cup for teams in Lower Saxony. Meppen play their matches at the Hänsch-Arena, located in Meppen, Emsland, Lower Saxony, Germany. The season covers a period from 1 July 2017 to 30 June 2018.

== Players ==
=== Squad information ===
As of 23 January 2018

Note: Flags indicate national team as defined under FIFA eligibility rules; some limited exceptions apply. Players may hold more than one non-FIFA nationality.

No.	Pos.	Nation	Player
1	GK	(Netherlands) NED	Jeroen Gies
3	DF	(Germany) GER	Janik Jesgarzewski
4	MF	(Netherlands) NED	Menno Heerkes
5	DF	(Slovenia) SVN	Jovan Vidović
6	DF	(Germany) GER	Dennis Geiger
7	MF	(United States) USA	Devann Yao
8	MF	(Germany) GER	Thilo Leugers
9	FW	(Germany) GER	Nico Granatowski
10	MF	(Germany) GER	Martin Wagner
11	MF	(Germany) GER	Thorben Deters
14	FW	(Germany) GER	Leon Demaj
15	MF	(Germany) GER	Markus Ballmert

No.	Pos.	Nation	Player
17	MF	(Germany) GER	Max Kremer
18	FW	(Kosovo) KOS	Haris Hyseni
20	MF	(Germany) GER	Marius Kleinsorge
21	MF	(Germany) GER	Jens Robben
22	MF	(Germany) GER	Steffen Puttkammer
23	FW	(Germany) GER	Luka Tankulić
25	MF	(Germany) GER	Patrick Posipal
27	DF	(Germany) GER	David Vržogić
30	FW	(Germany) GER	Benjamin Girth
31	DF	(Germany) GER	Marcel Gebers
32	GK	(Germany) GER	Erik Domaschke
37	DF	(Germany) GER	Fabian Senninger
—	MF	(Germany) GER	Mike-Steven Bähre (on loan from Hannover 96)

The club played eleven consecutive seasons in the 2. Bundesliga from 1988 to 1998. In 404 games there, the team scored 495 goals, with a record of 124 wins, 139 draws, and 141 losses.

== Competitions ==
Win Draw Loss

=== Overview ===
Competition	First match	Last match	Starting round	Final position	Record							
Competition	First match	Last match	Starting round	Final position	Pld	W	D	L	GF	GA	GD	Win %
3. Liga	22 July 2017	12 May 2018	Matchday 1		24	9	8	7	28	29	−1	37.50
Lower Saxony Cup	19 July 2017	19 July 2017	Qualification round	Qualification round	1	0	0	1	0	2	−2	0.00
Total					25	9	8	8	28	31	−3	36.00

Last updated: 10 February 2018
Source: Competitions

=== 3. Liga ===
==== League table ====
Pos	Team	Pld	W	D	L	GF	GA	GD	Pts
5	Würzburger Kickers	38	17	10	11	53	46	+7	61
6	Hansa Rostock	38	16	12	10	48	34	+14	60
7	SV Meppen	38	15	13	10	50	47	+3	58
8	Fortuna Köln	38	15	9	14	53	48	+5	54
9	SpVgg Unterhaching	38	16	6	16	54	55	−1	54

Source: DFB
Rules for classification: 1) Points; 2) Goal difference; 3) Goals scored

==== Results summary ====
Overall								Home						Away					
Pld	W	D	L	GF	GA	GD	Pts	W	D	L	GF	GA	GD	W	D	L	GF	GA	GD
24	9	8	7	28	29	−1	35	6	4	2	20	12	+8	3	4	5	8	17	−9

Last updated: 10 February 2018.
Source: kicker

==== Results by round ====
Round	1	2	3	4	5	6	7	8	9	10	11	12	13	14	15	16	17	18	19	20	21	22	23	24	25	26	27	28	29	30	31	32	33	34	35	36	37	38
Ground	H	A	H	A	H	A	H	A	H	A	H	A	H	A	H	A	H	A	H	A	H	A	H	A	H	A	H	A	H	A	H	A	H	A	H	A	H	A
Result	D	L	L	W	W	L	D	D	W	L	W	W	W	L	W	D	D	D	D	L	W	D	L	W														
Position	9	17	18	13	10	11	11	10	9	10	7	6	6	7	7	9	9	9	9	11	9	8	10															

Updated to match(es) played on 10 February 2018. Source: kicker
A = Away; H = Home; W = Win; D = Draw; L = Loss

==== Matches ====
22 July 2017 1	SV Meppen	2–2	Würzburger Kickers	Meppen
13:00 CEST (UTC+2)	Wagner 26'; Girth 82'	Report	Göbel 57'; Jopek 60'	Stadium: Hänsch-Arena; Attendance: 5,088; Referee: Tobias Stieler

29 July 2017 2	Preußen Münster	3–0	SV Meppen	Münster
13:00 CEST (UTC+2)	Grimaldi 51'; Kobylański 66'; Al-Hazaimeh 86'	Report		Stadium: Preußenstadion; Attendance: 9,130; Referee: Benedikt Kempkes

2 August 2017 3	SV Meppen	1–2	1. FC Magdeburg	Meppen
18:00 CEST (UTC+2)	Girth 18'	Report	Ludwig 5' (pen.); Niemeyer 65'	Stadium: Hänsch-Arena; Attendance: 8,389; Referee: Sören Storks

5 August 2017 4	Hansa Rostock	1–2	SV Meppen	Rostock
13:00 CEST (UTC+2)	Ziemer 68'	Report	Girth 51'; Granatowski 88'	Stadium: Ostseestadion; Attendance: 12,300; Referee: Thorben Siewer

18 August 2017 5	SV Meppen	4–0	FSV Zwickau	Meppen
18:00 CEST (UTC+2)	Leugers 2' (pen.); Girth 44', 76'; Kremer 90+1'	Report		Stadium: Hänsch-Arena; Attendance: 6,243; Referee: Michael Bacher

25 August 2017 6	SC Paderborn	1–0	SV Meppen	Paderborn
18:00 CEST (UTC+2)	Wassey 16' (pen.)	Report		Stadium: Benteler-Arena; Attendance: 9,421; Referee: Martin Thomsen

10 September 2017 7	SV Meppen	1–1	VfR Aalen	Meppen
13:00 CEST (UTC+2)	Kleinsorge 64'	Report	Vasiliadis 30'	Stadium: Hänsch-Arena; Attendance: 6,220; Referee: Felix-Benjamin Schwermer

16 September 2017 8	Carl Zeiss Jena	2–2	SV Meppen	Jena
13:00 CEST (UTC+2)	Eismann 58', 81'	Report	Kleinsorge 18'; Vidović 45+1'	Stadium: Ernst-Abbe-Sportfeld; Attendance: 4,229; Referee: Benjamin Bläser

20 September 2017 9	SV Meppen	1–0	VfL Osnabrück	Meppen
17:30 CEST (UTC+2)	Granatowski 39'	Report		Stadium: Hänsch-Arena; Attendance: 13,286; Referee: Sascha Stegemann

23 September 2017 10	SpVgg Unterhaching	4–0	SV Meppen	Unterhaching
13:00 CEST (UTC+2)	Bigalke 16'; Dombrowka 25'; Hain 49'; Lux 84'	Report		Stadium: Alpenbauer Sportpark; Attendance: 3,250; Referee: Oliver Lossius

1 October 2017 11	SV Meppen	2–0	Karlsruher SC	Meppen
13:00 CEST (UTC+2)	Girth 51'; Kleinsorge 61'	Report		Stadium: Hänsch-Arena; Attendance: 7,183; Referee: Benedikt Kempkes

14 October 2017 12	Wehen Wiesbaden	0–1	SV Meppen	Wiesbaden
13:00 CEST (UTC+2)		Report	Girth 42'	Stadium: Brita-Arena; Attendance: 2,380; Referee: Bastian Börner

21 October 2017 13	SV Meppen	1–0	Fortuna Köln	Meppen
13:00 CEST (UTC+2)	Leugers 48' (pen.)	Report		Stadium: Hänsch-Arena; Attendance: 6,351; Referee: Justus Zorn

28 October 2017 14	Hallescher FC	2–0	SV Meppen	Halle
13:00 CEST (UTC+2)	Röser 6'; Gjasula 49'	Report		Stadium: Erdgas Sportpark; Attendance: 5,533; Referee: Henry Müller

4 November 2017 15	SV Meppen	3–2	Chemnitzer FC	Meppen
13:00 CET (UTC+1)	Girth 56', 62', 88'	Report	Kluft 1'; Slavov 65'	Stadium: Hänsch-Arena; Attendance: 6,235; Referee: Florian Kornblum

18 November 2017 16	Sportfreunde Lotte	2–2	SV Meppen	Lotte
13:00 CET (UTC+1)	Straith 52'; Posipal 89' (o.g.)	Report	Kleinsorge 45', 80'	Stadium: Frimo Stadion; Attendance: 6,331; Referee: Oliver Lossius

24 November 2017 17	SV Meppen	1–1	Sonnenhof Großaspach	Meppen
18:00 CET (UTC+1)	Girth 15'	Report	Vitzthum 75'	Stadium: Hänsch-Arena; Attendance: 6,138; Referee: Tobias Fritsch

2 December 2017 18	Rot-Weiß Erfurt	0–0	SV Meppen	Erfurt
13:00 CET (UTC+1)		Report		Stadium: Steigerwaldstadion; Attendance: 3,933; Referee: Jonas Weickenmeier

9 December 2017 19	SV Meppen	2–2	Werder Bremen II	Meppen
13:00 CET (UTC+1)	Kleinsorge 13'; Wagner 59'	Report	Verlaat 8'; Manneh 75'	Stadium: Hänsch-Arena; Attendance: 5,808; Referee: Asmir Osmanagić

16 December 2017 20	Würzburger Kickers	2–0	SV Meppen	Würzburg
13:00 CET (UTC+1)	Taffertshofer 41'; Schuppan 58'	Report		Stadium: Flyeralarm Arena; Attendance: 4,852; Referee: Justus Zorn

21 January 2018 21	SV Meppen	2–0	Preußen Münster	Meppen
13:00 CET (UTC+1)	Wagner 20'; Leugers 75' (pen.)	Report		Stadium: Hänsch-Arena; Attendance: 9,107; Referee: Alexander Sather

27 January 2018 22	1. FC Magdeburg	0–0	SV Meppen	Magdeburg
13:00 CET (UTC+1)		Report		Stadium: MDCC-Arena; Attendance: 16,606; Referee: Patrick Alt

3 February 2018 23	SV Meppen	0–2	Hansa Rostock	Meppen
13:00 CET (UTC+1)	Väyrynen 10'; Scherff 85'	Report		Stadium: Hänsch-Arena; Attendance: 8,296; Referee: Patrick Schult

10 February 2018 24	FSV Zwickau	0–1	SV Meppen	Zwickau
13:00 CET (UTC+1)		Report	Girth 22'	Stadium: Stadion Zwickau; Attendance: 3,850; Referee: Markus Wollenweber

25	SV Meppen	v	SC Paderborn	Meppen
		Report		Stadium: Hänsch-Arena

26	VfR Aalen	v	SV Meppen	Aalen
		Report		Stadium: Ostalb Arena

27	SV Meppen	v	Carl Zeiss Jena	Meppen
		Report		Stadium: Hänsch-Arena

28	VfL Osnabrück	v	SV Meppen	Osnabrück
		Report		Stadium: Stadion an der Bremer Brücke

29	SV Meppen	v	SpVgg Unterhaching	Meppen
		Report		Stadium: Hänsch-Arena

30	Karlsruher SC	v	SV Meppen	Karlsruhe
		Report		Stadium: Wildparkstadion

31	SV Meppen	v	Wehen Wiesbaden	Meppen
		Report		Stadium: Hänsch-Arena

32	Fortuna Köln	v	SV Meppen	Cologne
		Report		Stadium: Südstadion

33	SV Meppen	v	Hallescher FC	Meppen
		Report		Stadium: Hänsch-Arena

34	Chemnitzer FC	v	SV Meppen	Chemnitz
		Report		Stadium: Community4you Arena

35	SV Meppen	v	Sportfreunde Lotte	Meppen
		Report		Stadium: Hänsch-Arena

36	Sonnenhof Großaspach	v	SV Meppen	Aspach
		Report		Stadium: Mechatronik Arena

5 May 2018 37	SV Meppen	v	Rot-Weiß Erfurt	Meppen
12:30 CEST (UTC+2)		Report		Stadium: Hänsch-Arena

12 May 2018 38	Werder Bremen II	v	SV Meppen	Bremen
12:30 CEST (UTC+2)		Report		Stadium: Weserstadion Platz 11

=== Lower Saxony Cup ===
19 July 2017 Qualification round	VfB Oldenburg	2–0	SV Meppen	Oldenburg
18:30 CEST (UTC+2)	Richter 31'; Franziskus 59'	Report		Stadium: Marschweg-Stadion; Attendance: 3,509; Referee: Henrik Bramlage
