= 2018–19 3. Liga =

11th season of the 3. Liga

3. Liga
- Season: 2018–19
- Dates: 27 July 2018 – 18 May 2019
- Champions: VfL Osnabrück
- Promoted: VfL Osnabrück; Karlsruher SC; Wehen Wiesbaden
- Relegated: Energie Cottbus; Sportfreunde Lotte; Fortuna Köln; VfR Aalen
- Matches: 380
- Goals: 982 (2.58 per match)
- Top goalscorer: Marvin Pourié (22 goals)
- Biggest home win: Unterhaching 6–0 Köln
- Biggest away win: Köln 0–7 Wiesbaden
- Highest scoring: Jena 4–5 Unterhaching
- Longest winning run: 7 games VfL Osnabrück
- Longest unbeaten run: 15 games VfL Osnabrück
- Longest winless run: 14 games VfR Aalen
- Longest losing run: 5 games VfR Aalen; 1860 Munich
- Highest attendance: 41,324; Kaiserslautern v Munich
- Lowest attendance: 1,393; Lotte v Aalen
- Attendance: 3,089,354 (8,130 per match)

The 2018–19 3. Liga was the eleventh season of the 3. Liga. It began on 27 July 2018 and concluded on 18 May 2019. For the first time in the history of the 3. Liga, no reserve teams managed to obtain a spot in the league. VfL Osnabrück and Karlsruher SC gained promotion the 2. Bundesliga, with Wehen Wiesbaden also earning promotion through the play-offs, while Energie Cottbus, Sportfreunde Lotte, Fortuna Köln and VfR Aalen were relegated to the Regionalliga.

== Teams ==
Locations of the 2018–19 3. Liga teams

=== Team changes ===
Promoted from 2017–18 Regionalliga	Relegated from 2017–18 2. Bundesliga	Promoted to 2018–19 2. Bundesliga	Relegated to 2018–19 Regionalliga
Energie Cottbus; 1860 Munich; KFC Uerdingen	Eintracht Braunschweig; 1. FC Kaiserslautern	SC Paderborn; 1. FC Magdeburg	Werder Bremen II; Chemnitzer FC; Rot-Weiß Erfurt

=== Stadiums and locations ===
Team	Location	Stadium	Capacity
VfR Aalen	Aalen	Ostalb Arena	14,500
Eintracht Braunschweig	Braunschweig	Eintracht-Stadion	23,325
Energie Cottbus	Cottbus	Stadion der Freundschaft	22,528
SG Sonnenhof Großaspach	Aspach	Mechatronik Arena	10,000
Hallescher FC	Halle	Erdgas Sportpark	15,057
Carl Zeiss Jena	Jena	Ernst-Abbe-Sportfeld	12,990
1. FC Kaiserslautern	Kaiserslautern	Fritz-Walter-Stadion	49,780
Karlsruher SC	Karlsruhe	Wildparkstadion	29,699
Fortuna Köln	Cologne	Südstadion	14,800
Sportfreunde Lotte	Lotte	Sportpark am Lotter Kreuz	10,059
SV Meppen	Meppen	Hänsch-Arena	16,500
1860 Munich	Munich	Grünwalder Stadion	15,000
Preußen Münster	Münster	Preußenstadion	15,050
VfL Osnabrück	Osnabrück	Stadion an der Bremer Brücke	16,667
Hansa Rostock	Rostock	Ostseestadion	29,000
KFC Uerdingen	Duisburg	MSV-Arena	31,500
SpVgg Unterhaching	Unterhaching	Sportpark Unterhaching	15,053
SV Wehen Wiesbaden	Wiesbaden	BRITA-Arena	12,250
Würzburger Kickers	Würzburg	Flyeralarm Arena	14,500
FSV Zwickau	Zwickau	Stadion Zwickau	10,049

=== Personnel and kits ===
Team	Manager	Captain	Kit manufacturer	Shirt sponsor
VfR Aalen	(Germany) Rico Schmitt	(Germany) Daniel Bernhardt	Saller	Telenot
Eintracht Braunschweig	(Germany) André Schubert	(Germany) Stephan Fürstner	Erima	SEAT
Energie Cottbus	(Germany) Claus-Dieter Wollitz	(Germany) Marc Stein	Jako	karton.eu
SG Sonnenhof Großaspach	(Germany) Markus Lang	(Germany) Timo Röttger	Nike	Sanwald
Hallescher FC	(Germany) Torsten Ziegner	(Germany) Jan Washausen	Puma	Halplus
Carl Zeiss Jena	(Germany) Lukas Kwasniok	(Germany) René Eckardt	Puma	sunmaker
Sportfreunde Lotte	(Germany) Ismail Atalan	(Germany) Tim Wendel	Puma	FRIMO Group
1. FC Kaiserslautern	(Germany) Sascha Hildmann	(Germany) Florian Dick	Uhlsport	Layenberger
Karlsruher SC	(Germany) Alois Schwartz	(Germany) David Pisot	Jako	Klaiber Markisen
Fortuna Köln	(Germany) Oliver Zapel	(Germany) Hamdi Dahmani	Errea	HIT Handelsgruppe
SV Meppen	(Germany) Christian Neidhart	(Germany) Martin Wagner	Nike	KiK xxl
Preußen Münster	(Germany) Marco Antwerpen	(Germany) Simon Scherder	Nike	Schauinsland-Reisen
1860 Munich	(Germany) Daniel Bierofka	(Germany) Felix Weber	Macron	Die Bayerische
VfL Osnabrück	(Germany) Daniel Thioune	(United States) Marc Heider	Puma	sunmaker
Hansa Rostock	(Germany) Jens Härtel	(Germany) Oliver Hüsing	Nike	sunmaker
KFC Uerdingen	(Germany) Heiko Vogel	(Germany) Mario Erb	Capelli	SWK
SpVgg Unterhaching	(Germany) Claus Schromm	(Germany) Josef Welzmüller	Adidas	frostkrone
SV Wehen Wiesbaden	(Germany) Rüdiger Rehm	(Poland) Sebastian Mrowca	Nike	Brita
Würzburger Kickers	(Germany) Michael Schiele	(Germany) Sebastian Schuppan	Jako	BVUK
FSV Zwickau	(United States) Joe Enochs	(Germany) Toni Wachsmuth	Puma	Zwickauer Energieversorgung

=== Managerial changes ===
Team	Outgoing manager	Manner of departure	Date of vacancy	Position in table	Incoming manager	Date of appointment
VfR Aalen	(Germany) Peter Vollmann	Resigned	30 June 2018	Preseason	(Greece) Argirios Giannikis	1 July 2018
Hallescher FC	(Germany) Rico Schmitt	Sacked	30 June 2018	Preseason	(Germany) Torsten Ziegner	1 July 2018
FSV Zwickau	(Germany) Danny König	End of caretaker	30 June 2018	Preseason	(United States) Joe Enochs	1 July 2018
Eintracht Braunschweig	(Germany) Torsten Lieberknecht	End of contract	30 June 2018	Preseason	(Denmark) Henrik Pedersen	1 July 2018
Sportfreunde Lotte	(Germany) Andreas Golombek	End of contract	30 June 2018	Preseason	(Germany) Matthias Maucksch	1 July 2018
Sportfreunde Lotte	(Germany) Matthias Maucksch	Sacked	24 August 2018	20th	(Germany) Klaus Bienemann (Germany) Andy Steinmann (interim)	24 August 2018
Sportfreunde Lotte	(Germany) Klaus Bienemann (Germany) Andy Steinmann (interim)	End of caretaker	30 August 2018	20th	(Germany) Nils Drube	30 August 2018
Sonnenhof Großaspach	(Germany) Sascha Hildmann	Sacked	5 October 2018	17th	(Croatia) Zlatko Blaškić (interim)	5 October 2018
Eintracht Braunschweig	(Denmark) Henrik Pedersen	Sacked	10 October 2018	20th	(Germany) André Schubert	10 October 2018
Fortuna Köln	(Germany) Uwe Koschinat	Contract terminated	15 October 2018	10th	(Germany) André Filipovic (interim)	15 October 2018
Sonnenhof Großaspach	(Croatia) Zlatko Blaškić (interim)	End of caretaker	17 October 2018	18th	(Germany) Florian Schnorrenberg	17 October 2018
Fortuna Köln	(Germany) André Filipovic (interim)	End of caretaker	30 October 2018	10th	(Poland) Tomasz Kaczmarek	30 October 2018
1. FC Kaiserslautern	(Germany) Michael Frontzeck	Sacked	1 December 2018	10th	(Germany) Sascha Hildmann	6 December 2018
Carl Zeiss Jena	(Germany) Mark Zimmermann	Sacked	8 December 2018	18th	(Germany) Lukas Kwasniok	9 December 2018
Hansa Rostock	(Bulgaria) Pavel Dochev	Sacked	4 January 2019	8th	(Germany) Jens Härtel	9 January 2019
KFC Uerdingen	(Germany) Stefan Krämer	Sacked	28 January 2019	4th	(Germany) Stefan Reisinger (interim)	31 January 2019
KFC Uerdingen	(Germany) Stefan Reisinger (interim)	End of caretaker	3 February 2019	4th	(Germany) Norbert Meier	3 February 2019
VfR Aalen	(Greece) Argirios Giannikis	Sacked	10 February 2019	20th	(Germany) Rico Schmitt	13 February 2019
KFC Uerdingen	(Germany) Norbert Meier	Sacked	15 March 2019	7th	(Germany) Frank Heinemann (interim)	16 March 2019
Sportfreunde Lotte	(Germany) Nils Drube	Sacked	9 April 2019	16th	(Germany) Ismail Atalan (interim)	9 April 2019
Fortuna Köln	(Poland) Tomasz Kaczmarek	Sacked	22 April 2019	17th	(Germany) Oliver Zapel	22 April 2019
KFC Uerdingen	(Germany) Frank Heinemann (interim)	End of caretaker	30 April 2019	8th	(Germany) Heiko Vogel	30 April 2019
Sonnenhof Großaspach	(Germany) Florian Schnorrenberg	Sacked	6 May 2019	18th	(Germany) Markus Lang (interim)	6 May 2019

== League table ==
Pos	Team	Pld	W	D	L	GF	GA	GD	Pts	Promotion, qualification or relegation
1	VfL Osnabrück (C, P)	38	22	10	6	56	31	+25	76	Promotion to 2. Bundesliga and qualification for DFB-Pokal
2	Karlsruher SC (P)	38	20	11	7	64	38	+26	71	Promotion to 2. Bundesliga and qualification for DFB-Pokal
3	Wehen Wiesbaden (O, P)	38	22	4	12	71	47	+24	70	Qualification for promotion play-offs and DFB-Pokal
4	Hallescher FC	38	19	9	10	47	34	+13	66	Qualification for DFB-Pokal
5	Würzburger Kickers	38	16	9	13	56	45	+11	57	
6	Hansa Rostock	38	14	13	11	47	46	+1	55	
7	FSV Zwickau	38	14	10	14	49	47	+2	52	
8	Preußen Münster	38	15	7	16	48	50	−2	52	
9	1. FC Kaiserslautern	38	13	12	13	49	51	−2	51	
10	SpVgg Unterhaching	38	11	15	12	53	46	+7	48	
11	KFC Uerdingen	38	14	6	18	47	62	−15	48	
12	1860 Munich	38	12	11	15	48	52	−4	47	
13	SV Meppen	38	13	8	17	48	53	−5	47	
14	Carl Zeiss Jena	38	11	13	14	48	57	−9	46	
15	Sonnenhof Großaspach	38	9	18	11	38	39	−1	45	
16	Eintracht Braunschweig	38	10	15	13	48	54	−6	45	
17	Energie Cottbus (R)	38	12	9	17	51	58	−7	45	Relegation to Regionalliga
18	Sportfreunde Lotte (R)	38	9	13	16	31	46	−15	40	Relegation to Regionalliga
19	Fortuna Köln (R)	38	9	12	17	38	64	−26	39	Relegation to Regionalliga
20	VfR Aalen (R)	38	6	13	19	45	62	−17	31	Relegation to Regionalliga

Source: DFB
Rules for classification: 1) Points; 2) Goal difference; 3) Goals scored; 4) Head-to-head results; 5) Head-to-head away goals scored; 6) Away goals scored; 7) Play-off.
(C) Champions; (O) Play-off winners; (P) Promoted; (R) Relegated

== Results ==
Home \ Away	AAL	BRA	COT	GRO	HAL	JEN	KAI	KAR	KÖL	LOT	MEP	MUN	MÜN	OSN	ROS	UER	UNT	WIE	WÜR	ZWI
VfR Aalen	—	1–3	3–3	1–1	0–1	1–1	1–2	1–3	0–1	1–2	1–2	1–4	4–1	1–1	1–1	2–4	4–1	1–2	3–2	1–1
Eintracht Braunschweig	2–2	—	1–1	1–1	0–1	2–0	1–4	1–1	0–2	2–2	3–0	1–1	3–3	3–4	2–0	0–2	1–0	2–3	2–2	1–1
Energie Cottbus	2–1	0–1	—	0–0	1–2	2–1	1–1	0–2	4–3	2–2	1–1	1–2	3–0	1–2	3–0	0–2	2–2	2–3	1–2	2–1
Sonnenhof Großaspach	1–1	1–1	0–0	—	1–1	0–0	1–1	1–2	1–1	0–1	1–0	1–0	3–1	0–0	0–0	3–2	1–1	2–3	2–1	5–2
Hallescher FC	1–0	1–0	2–3	2–0	—	0–0	2–0	0–3	1–2	0–0	2–1	3–0	1–2	1–1	0–1	4–0	1–1	1–4	1–0	2–0
Carl Zeiss Jena	0–0	0–0	2–1	3–2	0–3	—	3–3	1–1	0–1	1–1	1–2	4–0	0–0	0–0	1–1	0–0	4–5	3–1	3–4	2–1
1. FC Kaiserslautern	0–1	0–0	0–2	2–0	0–0	4–1	—	0–0	3–3	2–1	4–2	1–0	1–2	1–3	0–2	2–0	4–0	0–0	0–0	1–1
Karlsruher SC	0–3	1–1	2–0	2–1	2–3	1–1	0–1	—	3–1	1–3	3–1	3–2	5–0	2–1	1–1	2–0	4–0	2–5	2–1	1–1
Fortuna Köln	1–1	1–3	3–1	0–2	0–1	2–0	2–2	0–1	—	1–1	1–1	0–0	1–4	0–0	1–1	1–2	1–1	0–7	0–0	1–0
Sportfreunde Lotte	1–1	0–1	0–3	0–2	0–1	2–0	0–2	0–0	1–2	—	0–0	1–1	1–0	0–0	1–0	1–3	0–0	0–1	1–2	2–1
SV Meppen	1–0	4–2	3–0	2–1	0–2	0–1	0–1	2–3	3–0	2–0	—	1–0	1–2	0–2	1–3	3–2	3–3	1–1	1–1	2–0
1860 Munich	2–1	2–0	2–0	2–2	1–1	1–3	2–1	0–2	3–2	5–1	1–0	—	0–1	1–0	1–2	0–1	1–0	1–2	1–1	2–0
Preußen Münster	4–0	3–0	3–0	1–0	1–2	1–2	2–0	1–4	0–2	1–0	1–1	0–0	—	0–0	0–1	0–1	3–0	3–0	1–0	0–2
VfL Osnabrück	3–1	1–0	3–1	0–2	2–0	3–1	2–0	0–1	1–0	1–0	1–0	2–2	3–0	—	1–2	2–1	1–4	2–1	2–1	3–0
Hansa Rostock	1–1	2–0	0–2	0–0	1–1	1–2	4–1	1–0	3–1	0–0	0–2	2–2	1–4	1–1	—	1–1	2–0	3–2	0–4	3–1
KFC Uerdingen	2–0	0–3	1–2	0–0	2–1	2–1	2–4	1–3	1–1	0–2	3–2	1–1	0–0	1–3	2–1	—	1–3	2–3	0–3	1–2
SpVgg Unterhaching	0–0	3–0	0–0	0–0	0–0	0–1	5–0	0–0	6–0	3–0	0–1	1–1	1–1	1–1	2–1	4–0	—	1–2	0–1	0–1
Wehen Wiesbaden	2–1	3–3	0–2	2–0	2–0	2–3	2–0	2–0	3–0	2–0	3–0	0–1	2–0	1–0	2–0	0–2	1–2	—	0–2	0–0
Würzburger Kickers	2–1	1–1	3–1	0–0	1–2	5–2	2–0	0–0	2–0	2–2	2–1	2–1	3–2	1–2	0–2	0–2	0–1	3–1	—	0–2
FSV Zwickau	2–3	0–1	2–1	3–0	2–0	2–0	1–1	1–1	1–0	0–2	1–1	5–2	2–0	0–1	2–2	2–0	2–2	2–1	2–0	—

Source: DFB
Legend: Blue = home team win; Yellow = draw; Red = away team win.

== Top scorers ==
Rank	Player	Club	Goals
1	(Germany) Marvin Pourié	Karlsruher SC	22
2	(Germany) Manuel Schäffler	Wehen Wiesbaden	16
3	(Germany) Anton Fink	Karlsruher SC	15
3	(Germany) Daniel-Kofi Kyereh	Wehen Wiesbaden	15
5	(Germany) Nick Proschwitz	SV Meppen	14
6	(Germany) Stephan Hain	SpVgg Unterhaching	13
6	(Germany) Stefan Schimmer	SpVgg Unterhaching	13
8	(Germany) Christian Kühlwetter	1. FC Kaiserslautern	12
9	(Switzerland) Orhan Ademi	Würzburger Kickers	11
9	(Germany) Marcos Álvarez	VfL Osnabrück	11
9	(Germany) Maximilian Beister	KFC Uerdingen	11
9	(Germany) Philipp Hofmann	Eintracht Braunschweig	11
9	(Poland) Martin Kobylański	Preußen Münster	11
9	(Germany) Ronny König	FSV Zwickau	11
9	(Germany) Streli Mamba	Energie Cottbus	11
9	(Germany) Phillip Tietz	Carl Zeiss Jena	11

== Number of teams by state ==
Position	State	Number of teams	Teams
1	North Rhine-Westphalia	4	Fortuna Köln, Sportfreunde Lotte, Preußen Münster and KFC Uerdingen
2	Baden-Württemberg	3	VfR Aalen, Sonnenhof Großaspach and Karlsruher SC
2	Bavaria	3	1860 Munich, SpVgg Unterhaching and Würzburger Kickers
2	Lower Saxony	3	Eintracht Braunschweig, SV Meppen and VfL Osnabrück
5	Brandenburg	1	Energie Cottbus
5	Hesse	1	Wehen Wiesbaden
5	Mecklenburg-Vorpommern	1	Hansa Rostock
5	Rhineland-Palatinate	1	1. FC Kaiserslautern
5	Saxony	1	FSV Zwickau
5	Saxony-Anhalt	1	Hallescher FC
5	Thuringia	1	Carl Zeiss Jena
