= 2021–22 3. Liga =

14th season of the 3. Liga

3. Liga
- Season: 2021–22
- Dates: 24 July 2021 – 14 May 2022
- Champions: 1. FC Magdeburg
- Promoted: 1. FC Magdeburg; Eintracht Braunschweig; 1. FC Kaiserslautern
- Relegated: Viktoria Berlin; Würzburger Kickers; TSV Havelse; Türkgücü München
- Matches: 373
- Goals: 951 (2.55 per match)
- Top goalscorer: Marcel Bär (21 goals)
- Biggest home win: Zwickau 7–0 Würzburg; Mannheim 7–0 Havelse
- Biggest away win: Havelse 0–6 Kaiserslautern; Berlin 0–6 Braunschweig; Duisburg 0–6 1860 Munich
- Highest scoring: Duisburg 3–6 Osnabrück; Verl 4–5 Magdeburg; 1860 Munich 6–3 Dortmund
- Longest winning run: 4 games Kaiserslautern; Magdeburg; Meppen; 1860 Munich; Saarbrücken
- Longest unbeaten run: 16 games Magdeburg
- Longest winless run: 12 games Würzburg
- Longest losing run: 6 games Havelse
- Attendance: 2,093,273 (5,612 per match) (Note: Due to the COVID-19 pandemic in Germany, each local health department allows a different number of spectators.)

The 2021–22 3. Liga was the 14th season of the 3. Liga. It was originally scheduled to start on 23 July 2021 and concluded on 14 May 2022; however, the opening match between VfL Osnabrück and MSV Duisburg had to be postponed after Duisburg was quarantined due to COVID-19 cases, delaying the season start by one day.

From this season onward, the German Football Association will allow clubs to place a sponsor logo on the back of their shirts.

The league fixtures were announced on 1 July 2021.

== Teams ==
Locations of the 2021–22 3. Liga teams

=== Team changes ===
Originally, SV Meppen was relegated from the 2020–21 3. Liga. However, KFC Uerdingen could not meet the licensing requirements, sparing Meppen from relegation.

Promoted from 2020–21 Regionalliga	Relegated from 2020–21 2. Bundesliga	Promoted to 2021–22 2. Bundesliga	Relegated from 2020–21 3. Liga
Viktoria Berlin; Borussia Dortmund II; SC Freiburg II; TSV Havelse	VfL Osnabrück; Eintracht Braunschweig; Würzburger Kickers	Dynamo Dresden; Hansa Rostock; FC Ingolstadt	KFC Uerdingen; Bayern Munich II; VfB Lübeck; SpVgg Unterhaching

=== Stadiums and locations ===
Team	Location	Stadium	Capacity
Viktoria Berlin	Berlin	Friedrich-Ludwig-Jahn-Stadion^{1}	10,000
Eintracht Braunschweig	Braunschweig	Eintracht-Stadion	23,325
Preußen Münster	Münster	Preußenstadion	9,999
MSV Duisburg	Duisburg	Schauinsland-Reisen-Arena	31,500
Unterhaching	Unterhaching	Sportpark Unterhaching	24,000
Hallescher FC	Halle	Leuna-Chemie-Stadion	15,057
TSV Havelse	Hanover	HDI-Arena^{3}	49,200
1. FC Kaiserslautern	Kaiserslautern	Fritz-Walter-Stadion	49,780
Viktoria Köln	Cologne	Sportpark Höhenberg	10,001
1. FC Magdeburg	Magdeburg	MDCC-Arena	27,500
Waldhof Mannheim	Mannheim	Carl-Benz-Stadion	25,667
SV Meppen	Meppen	Hänsch-Arena	16,500
1860 Munich	Munich	Grünwalder Stadion	15,000
Türkgücü München	Munich	Olympiastadion; Grünwalder Stadion	69,250; 15,000
VfL Osnabrück	Osnabrück	Stadion an der Bremer Brücke	16,667
1. FC Saarbrücken	Saarbrücken	Ludwigsparkstadion	16,003
SC Verl	Lotte; Paderborn	Stadion am Lotter Kreuz; Benteler-Arena^{4}	10,059; 15,000
Wehen Wiesbaden	Wiesbaden	BRITA-Arena	12,250
Würzburger Kickers	Würzburg	Flyeralarm Arena	14,500
FSV Zwickau	Zwickau	GGZ-Arena Zwickau	10,049

^{1} Viktoria Berlin will play their home matches at the Friedrich-Ludwig-Jahn-Stadion since their home stadium, the Stadion Lichterfelde, did not meet 3. Liga standards.
^{2} SC Freiburg II moved to the Dreisamstadion after SC Freiburg moved to the Europa-Park Stadion, since their previous home stadium, the Möslestadion, did not meet 3. Liga standards.
^{3} TSV Havelse will play their home matches at the HDI-Arena since their home stadium, the Wilhelm-Langrehr-Stadion in Garbsen, did not meet 3. Liga standards.
^{4} SC Verl will play their home matches at the Stadion am Lotter Kreuz since their home stadium, the Sportclub Arena in Verl, did not meet 3. Liga standards. They will move to the Benteler-Arena for the last five home matches of the season.

=== Personnel and kits ===
Team	Manager	Captain	Kit manufacturer	Shirt sponsor		
Team	Manager	Captain	Kit manufacturer	Front	Sleeve	Back
Viktoria Berlin	(Germany) Farat Toku	(Germany) Christoph Menz	Capelli			
Eintracht Braunschweig	(Germany) Michael Schiele	(Bosnia and Herzegovina) Jasmin Fejzić	Puma	Heycar		
MSV Duisburg	(Germany) Torsten Ziegner	(Germany) Moritz Stoppelkamp	Capelli	ZOXS	Rheinpower	
Hallescher FC	(Germany) André Meyer	(Germany) Jonas Nietfeld	Puma	sunmaker	Saalesparkasse	Hofmann Personal
TSV Havelse	(Germany) Rüdiger Ziehl	(Germany) Tobias Fölster	Nike	reifen.com	City of Garbsen	Stadtwerke Garbsen
1. FC Kaiserslautern	(Germany) Dirk Schuster	(Germany) Jean Zimmer	Nike	Allgäuer Latschenkiefer	Lotto Rheinland-Pfalz	Kemmler Kopier Systeme
Viktoria Köln	(Germany) Olaf Janßen	(Germany) Marcel Risse	Capelli	ETL	Wintec Autoglas	
1. FC Magdeburg	(Germany) Christian Titz	(Germany) Tobias Müller	Uhlsport	Humanas	SWM Magdeburg	
Waldhof Mannheim	(Germany) Patrick Glöckner	(Germany) Marcel Seegert	Capelli	Suntat	Eichbaum	
SV Meppen	(Germany) Rico Schmitt	(Germany) Thilo Leugers	Nike	KiK xxl	Echt Emsland	
1860 Munich	(Germany) Michael Köllner	(Germany) Stefan Lex	Nike	Die Bayerische	Bet3000	Pangea Life
Türkgücü München	(Austria) Andreas Heraf	(Albania) Mërgim Mavraj	Capelli	Remitly		
VfL Osnabrück	(Germany) Daniel Scherning	(Germany) Marc Heider	Puma	SO-TECH	Jopa	
1. FC Saarbrücken	(Germany) Uwe Koschinat	(Germany) Manuel Zeitz	Adidas	Victor's Group	Saarland-Sporttoto	Victor's Group
SC Verl	(Germany) Michél Kniat	(United States) Mael Corboz	Joma	Beckhoff	EGE GmbH	
Wehen Wiesbaden	(Germany) Markus Kauczinski	(Poland) Sebastian Mrowca	Capelli	Brita	sunmaker	
Würzburger Kickers	(Germany) Ralf Santelli	(Germany) Christian Strohdiek	Jako	BVUK		
FSV Zwickau	(United States) Joe Enochs	(Germany) Johannes Brinkies	Puma	Omni Group	ATUS	WP Holding

=== Managerial changes ===
Team	Outgoing	Manner	Exit date		Position in table	Incoming	Incoming date		Ref.
Team	Outgoing	Manner	Announced on	Departed on	Position in table	Incoming	Announced on	Arrived on	Ref.
1. FC Saarbrücken	(Poland) Lukas Kwasniok	End of contract	5 February 2021	30 June 2021	Pre-season	(Germany) Uwe Koschinat	6 April 2021	1 July 2021	
SC Freiburg II	(Germany) Christian Preußer	End of contract	8 February 2021	30 June 2021	Pre-season	(Switzerland) Thomas Stamm	31 March 2021	1 July 2021	
Würzburger Kickers	(Germany) Ralf Santelli / (Germany) Sebastian Schuppan (interim)	End of caretaker spell	2 April 2021	30 June 2021	Pre-season	(Germany) Torsten Ziegner	24 May 2021	1 July 2021	
Türkgücü München	(Germany) Andreas Pummer (interim)	End of caretaker spell	6 May 2021	30 June 2021	Pre-season	(Czech Republic) Petr Ruman	29 April 2021	1 July 2021	
TSV Havelse	(Germany) Jan Zimmermann	Signed for Hannover 96	10 May 2021	30 June 2021	Pre-season	(Germany) Rüdiger Ziehl	28 June 2021	1 July 2021	
Eintracht Braunschweig	(Germany) Daniel Meyer	Sacked	27 May 2021	30 June 2021	Pre-season	(Germany) Michael Schiele	6 June 2021	1 July 2021	
VfL Osnabrück	(Germany) Markus Feldhoff	End of contract	31 May 2021	30 June 2021	Pre-season	(Germany) Daniel Scherning	7 June 2021	1 July 2021	
Türkgücü München	(Czech Republic) Petr Ruman	Sacked	20 September 2021		10th	(Germany) Peter Hyballa	20 September 2021		
Würzburger Kickers	(Germany) Torsten Ziegner	Sacked	4 October 2021		19th	(Germany) Danny Schwarz	13 October 2021		
MSV Duisburg	(Bulgaria) Pavel Dochev	Sacked	7 October 2021		17th	(Germany) Uwe Schubert (interim)	7 October 2021		
MSV Duisburg	(Germany) Uwe Schubert (interim)	End of caretaker spell	18 October 2021		17th	(Germany) Hagen Schmidt	18 October 2021		
Wehen Wiesbaden	(Germany) Rüdiger Rehm	Sacked	25 October 2021		9th	(Germany) Mike Krannich/ (Germany) Nils Döring (interim)	25 October 2021		
Wehen Wiesbaden	(Germany) Mike Krannich/ (Germany) Nils Döring (interim)	End of caretaker spell	8 November 2021		7th	(Germany) Markus Kauczinski	8 November 2021		
Türkgücü München	(Germany) Peter Hyballa	Sacked	23 November 2021		16th	(Germany) Alper Kayabunar (interim)	23 November 2021		
Hallescher FC	(Germany) Florian Schnorrenberg	Sacked	21 December 2021		14th	(Germany) André Meyer	27 December 2021		
Türkgücü München	(Germany) Alper Kayabunar (interim)	End of caretaker	27 December 2021		16th	(Austria) Andreas Heraf	27 December 2021		
Würzburger Kickers	(Germany) Danny Schwarz	Sacked	10 February 2022		20th	(Germany) Ralf Santelli	10 February 2022		
SC Verl	(Germany) Guerino Capretti	Sacked	15 February 2022		17th	(Germany) Michél Kniat	15 February 2022		
Viktoria Berlin	(Germany) Benedetto Muzzicato	Sacked	20 February 2022		16th	(Germany) Farat Toku	3 March 2022		
MSV Duisburg	(Germany) Hagen Schmidt	Sacked	4 May 2022		15th	(Germany) Torsten Ziegner	4 May 2022		
1. FC Kaiserslautern	(Germany) Marco Antwerpen	Sacked	10 May 2022		3rd	(Germany) Dirk Schuster	10 May 2022		

== League table ==
Pos	Team	Pld	W	D	L	GF	GA	GD	Pts	Promotion, qualification or relegation
1	1. FC Magdeburg (C, P)	36	24	6	6	83	39	+44	78	Promotion to 2. Bundesliga and qualification for DFB-Pokal
2	Eintracht Braunschweig (P)	36	18	10	8	61	36	+25	64	Promotion to 2. Bundesliga and qualification for DFB-Pokal
3	1. FC Kaiserslautern (O, P)	36	18	9	9	56	27	+29	63	Qualification for promotion play-offs and DFB-Pokal
4	1860 Munich	36	17	10	9	67	50	+17	61	Qualification for DFB-Pokal
5	Waldhof Mannheim	36	16	12	8	58	40	+18	60	
6	VfL Osnabrück	36	16	10	10	56	48	+8	58	
7	1. FC Saarbrücken	36	14	11	11	50	44	+6	53	
8	Wehen Wiesbaden	36	14	9	13	49	44	+5	51	
9	Borussia Dortmund II (Note: Reserve teams are ineligible for promotion or DFB-Pokal qualification.)	36	14	7	15	51	48	+3	49	
10	FSV Zwickau	36	11	14	11	46	44	+2	47	
11	SC Freiburg II	36	12	11	13	34	42	−8	47	
12	SV Meppen	36	13	8	15	47	60	−13	47	
13	Viktoria Köln	36	12	9	15	39	52	−13	45	
14	Hallescher FC	36	10	13	13	46	48	−2	43	
15	MSV Duisburg	36	13	3	20	46	71	−25	42	
16	SC Verl	36	10	10	16	56	66	−10	40	
17	Viktoria Berlin (R)	36	10	7	19	44	62	−18	37	Relegation to Regionalliga
18	Würzburger Kickers (R)	36	7	9	20	34	59	−25	30	Relegation to Regionalliga
19	TSV Havelse (R)	36	5	8	23	28	71	−43	23	Relegation to Regionalliga
20	Türkgücü München (Note: Türkgücü München were deducted eleven points, nine after they filed for insolvency and two more for condition mistakes. On 24 March 2022, after the 31st matchday, Türkgücü München ceased to play for financial reasons. All their results were expunged. At the time, they were ranked 20th with 8 wins, 8 draws, 15 losses, 30–47 goals, and 21 points (after the deduction).) (R)	0	0	0	0	0	0	0	0	Results expunged

Source: DFB
Rules for classification: 1) Points; 2) Goal difference; 3) Goals scored; 4) Head-to-head results; 5) Head-to-head away goals scored; 6) Away goals scored; 7) Play-off.
(C) Champions; (O) Play-off winners; (P) Promoted; (R) Relegated

== Results ==
Home \ Away	BER	BRA	DOR	DUI	FRE	HAL	HAV	KAI	KÖL	MAG	MAN	MEP	MUN	TÜR	OSN	SAA	VER	WIE	WÜR	ZWI
Viktoria Berlin	—	0–6	2–1	0–1	0–2	0–1	3–4	4–0	2–1	2–1	1–0	3–4	0–2	0–0	1–2	2–1	1–1	3–1	1–1	0–0
Eintracht Braunschweig	0–4	—	4–2	2–1	1–1	1–0	3–2	1–1	0–1	2–1	0–0	5–0	1–1	2–0	2–2	0–2	1–1	1–2	1–0	2–0
Borussia Dortmund II	0–1	0–1	—	4–1	1–1	0–0	1–0	0–0	0–1	0–2	1–1	0–1	0–2	0–1	2–2	0–0	1–2	2–3	2–0	3–1
MSV Duisburg	1–0	3–2	1–3	—	1–0	2–1	3–0	1–1	2–0	0–5	1–3	0–1	0–6	2–0	3–6 (Note: The MSV Duisburg v VfL Osnabrück match from 19 December 2021 was abandoned after 35 minutes and a score of 0–0 after an alleged racial insult by a spectator targeted at Aaron Opoku. The DFB Sports Court decided to replay the match, which took place on 2 February 2022 and finished with a score of 3–6.)	3–4	2–2	0–2	2–0	0–1
SC Freiburg II	2–0	0–1	2–5	1–0	—	1–1	0–0	0–0	1–1	2–3	2–1	2–0	1–2	4–2	4–1	1–1	3–2	0–0	1–0	1–0
Hallescher FC	4–1	0–2	1–2	2–1	1–0	—	1–1	1–0	1–1	3–2	1–2	3–1	1–1	1–0	3–3	2–3	4–4	1–1	0–0	2–0
TSV Havelse	1–1	0–4	0–1	0–1	1–0	2–1	—	0–6	1–0	1–3	1–2	3–0	2–3	0–3	0–1	0–1	1–3	0–1	1–3	0–3
1. FC Kaiserslautern	2–0	0–0	1–3	5–1	3–0	1–0	3–0	—	4–0	2–2	0–0	4–0	3–0	—	2–0	3–1	2–1	1–0	0–2	1–1
Viktoria Köln	1–4	1–2	0–2	4–2	3–1	2–0	0–0	2–0	—	1–0	2–3	1–1	0–1	—	1–1	0–0	5–2	2–1	1–1	1–1
1. FC Magdeburg	1–0	2–0	2–0	2–1	0–0	1–1	1–1	1–0	4–2	—	3–0	0–0	4–0	4–0	2–1	2–1	2–0	3–1	1–2	3–0
Waldhof Mannheim	3–2	0–3	1–3	3–1	0–1	2–1	7–0	0–0	0–1	0–2	—	5–0	3–0	3–0	3–3	1–0	2–1	1–1	1–1	1–1
SV Meppen	3–0	3–2	1–1	1–2	0–1	4–1	1–0	2–0	4–0	2–3	1–1	—	1–1	1–0	0–1	2–2	1–0	0–4	2–4	1–3
1860 Munich	1–1	2–2	6–3	3–2	6–0	0–2	3–0	2–1	3–0	2–5	1–3	1–1	—	1–1	2–3	1–1	2–0	3–2	1–0	0–2
Türkgücü München	—	—	2–1	1–0	3–0	2–2	0–1	1–2	1–2	2–1	0–0	—	2–1	—	0–3	1–5	2–2	1–0	—	2–2
VfL Osnabrück	3–1	1–1	2–1	0–1	0–1	0–0	0–0	0–1	3–0	1–5	1–2	1–0	3–1	1–1	—	2–1	3–2	0–1	2–0	0–1
1. FC Saarbrücken	2–0	2–2	2–0	2–0	1–0	2–1	2–2	0–2	0–1	2–1	0–0	1–0	1–1	3–1	1–2	—	1–2	3–4	2–1	1–1
SC Verl	3–3	0–3	0–3	1–1	3–1	0–0	5–3	0–2	3–1	4–5	1–3	0–1	1–1	0–0	1–3	2–4	—	3–0	2–0	0–0
Wehen Wiesbaden	2–0	0–1	0–1	0–1	2–0	2–1	2–1	2–1	1–1	2–4	1–1	3–4	0–0	1–0	0–0	1–0	0–0	—	0–1	2–2
Würzburger Kickers	3–0	0–2	3–1	1–2	1–1	1–2	0–0	1–2	0–1	2–4	1–2	1–3	0–3	2–1	1–1	1–1	0–1	0–4	—	2–2
FSV Zwickau	1–1	1–0	1–2	3–2	0–0	2–2	2–0	0–2	1–0	1–1	1–1	1–1	1–3	—	1–3	1–2	1–3	2–1	7–0	—

Source: DFB
Legend: Blue = home team win; Yellow = draw; Red = away team win.

== Top scorers ==
Rank	Player	Club	Goals
1	(Germany) Marcel Bär	1860 Munich	21
2	(Turkey) Barış Atik	1. FC Magdeburg	19
3	(United States) Terrence Boyd	1. FC Kaiserslautern; Hallescher FC	15
4	(Sweden) Gustaf Nilsson	Wehen Wiesbaden	14
4	(Germany) Luka Tankulic	SV Meppen	14
6	(Germany) Michael Eberwein	Hallescher FC	13
7	(Switzerland) Orhan Ademi	MSV Duisburg	12
7	(Germany) Lion Lauberbach	Eintracht Braunschweig	12
7	(Germany) Luca Schuler	1. FC Magdeburg	12
10	(Germany) Dominic Baumann	FSV Zwickau	11
10	(Germany) Jason Ceka	1. FC Magdeburg	11
10	(Germany) Adriano Grimaldi	1. FC Saarbrücken	11
10	(Germany) Marc Heider	VfL Osnabrück	11
10	(Germany) Dominik Martinović	Waldhof Mannheim	11
10	(Germany) Lukas Petkov	SC Verl	11
10	(Germany) Marc Schnatterer	Waldhof Mannheim	11
10	(Netherlands) Vincent Vermeij	SC Freiburg II	11

== Number of teams by state ==
Position	State	Number of teams	Teams
1	Lower Saxony	4	Eintracht Braunschweig, TSV Havelse, SV Meppen and VfL Osnabrück
1	North Rhine-Westphalia	4	Borussia Dortmund II, MSV Duisburg, Viktoria Köln and SC Verl
3	Bavaria	3	1860 Munich, Türkgücü München and Würzburger Kickers
4	Baden-Württemberg	2	Waldhof Mannheim and SC Freiburg II
4	Saxony-Anhalt	2	Hallescher FC and 1. FC Magdeburg
5	Berlin	1	Viktoria Berlin
5	Hesse	1	Wehen Wiesbaden
5	Rhineland-Palatinate	1	1. FC Kaiserslautern
5	Saarland	1	1. FC Saarbrücken
5	Saxony	1	FSV Zwickau
