= Posipal =

Posipal is a surname. Notable people with the surname include:

- Josef Posipal (1927–1997), German footballer
- Patrick Posipal (born 1988), German footballer, son of Peer
- Peer Posipal (born 1962), German footballer, son of Josef
