= Heerkes =

Heerkes is a surname, likely of Dutch origin. Notable people with the surname include:

- Gert Heerkes (born 1965), Dutch football manager
- Menno Heerkes (born 1993), Dutch footballer
