= Nike Academy =

- Founded: 2009; 17 years ago
- Dissolved: 2017; 9 years ago
- Ground: St George's Park; Burton upon Trent, England
- Capacity: 3,100
- League: Friendlies
Home colours	Away colours

The Nike Football Academy was an English football academy funded and administered by Nike, Inc. The academy had a revolving squad of unsigned under-20 players and was run with the intention of helping them find a professional club. The academy was based at St George's Park National Football Centre. The squad was made up of players scouted worldwide and drafted to the squad through Nike Most Wanted trials. Over 50 players have gone on to play professional football over the years. The programme was led by manager Jon Goodman, with former Wolverhampton Wanderers player Matt Murray who worked as assistant manager.

The programme was also known for its collaborations with world class players, including Sami Khedira, Joe Hart, Rio Ferdinand, Francesco Totti, Mario Götze and others. Players such as David Accam, Tom Rogić, Majeed Waris, Petar Golubović and Evan Dimas are graduates of the programme.

The academy regularly played exhibition matches facing teams like FC Barcelona, Arsenal, Inter Milan, Manchester United and others.

The academy closed at the end of the 2016–17 season.

== Technical staff ==
Name	Role
(Republic of Ireland) Jon Goodman	Head coach
(England) Matt Murray	Assistant coach
(Mexico) Jesús Vázquez	Featured player
(Argentina) Lautaro Alegrini	Featured player
(Scotland) Jacob Donnely	Jugador Destacado
(Turkey) Utku Kolkoparan	Headcoach of Turkey

== Notable participants ==
- (Australia) Dejan Pandurevic
- (Australia) Tom Rogic
- (Belgium) Dario Van den Buijs
- (Cape Verde) Alvin Fortes
- (Croatia) Josip Juranović
- (England) Conor Branson
- (England) Sean Clare
- (England) David Goldsmith
- (England) Jorge Grant
- (England) Rarmani Edmonds-Green
- (England) Billy Ions
- (England) Alex Parsons
- (England) Jordan Rose
- (England) Bilal Sayoud
- (England) Ryan Sellers
- (England) Jordan Tillson
- (England) Jordan Tunnicliffe
- (England) Alex Whittle
- (Germany) Fabian Senninger
- (Ghana) David Accam
- (Ghana) Rolland Appiah
- (Ghana) Abdul Majeed Waris
- (Greece) Dimitris Komnos
- (Indonesia) Evan Dimas
- (Indonesia) Muhammad Rafli
- (Malaysia) Shazuan Ashraf Mathews
- (Morocco) Saifeddine Alami
- (Morocco) Ismail H'Maidat
- (Morocco) Brahim Sabaouni
- (Morocco) Alexis André Jr.
- (Netherlands) Delvin Pinheiro Frederico
- (Norway) Lars Herlofsen
- (New Zealand) Myer Bevan
- (Nicaragua) Kayro Flores Heatley
- (Peru) Fernando Canales
- (Peru) José Guidino
- (Poland) Matty Cash
- (Russia) Maksim Boychuk
- (Russia) Artemi Ukomsky
- (Ivory Coast) Siriki Dembélé
- (Spain) Youssef Ezzejjari
- (Spain) Ignacio Varona
- (Serbia) Petar Golubović
- (Singapore) Cameron Edwards
- (South Africa) Reyaad Pieterse
- (South Korea) Moon Seon-min
- (Suriname) Anfernee Dijksteel
- (Sweden) Pontus Almqvist
- (Thailand) Apirat Heemkhao
- (Thailand) Napapon Sripratheep
- (Uruguay) Gonzalo Balbi
- (Pakistan) Ahmad Chaudhry
