= Fernando Canales =

Fernando Canales may refer to:

- Fernando Canales (swimmer) (born 1959), swimming coach, originally from Puerto Rico
- Fernando Canales Clariond (born 1946), former governor of Nuevo León, Mexico and former Mexican Secretary of Energy
- Fernando Canales (footballer) (born 1995), Peruvian footballer, Universidad de San Martín
