= Gonzalo Balbi =

Uruguayan footballer (born 1992)

Personal information
- Full name: Gonzalo Balbi Lorenzo
- Date of birth: 5 June 1992 (age 34)
- Place of birth: Montevideo, Uruguay
- Position: Right-back

Youth career
- Sant Ildefons
- –2005: Ferrán Martorell
- 2005–2011: Cornellà
- 2011–2012: Nike Academy

Senior career*
Years	Team	Apps	(Gls)
2012	Terrassa		
2012–2014	Júpiter		
2014–2015	KR Reykjavík	29	(0)
Medal record
Knattspyrnufélag Reykjavíkur
Winner	Icelandic Cup	2014
Winner	Icelandic Super Cup	2014
Runner-up	Icelandic Cup	2015
Runner-up	Icelandic Super Cup	2015
- * Club domestic league appearances and goals

Gonzalo Balbi Lorenzo (born 5 June 1992) is a Uruguayan former footballer.

== Career ==
Born in Montevideo, Uruguay, Balbi moved to Barcelona when he was just 11. He started his footballing career with local Spanish sides UE Sant Ildefons and Fundación Ferrán Martorell, before joining UE Cornellà. He participated in 'The Chance', organised by the Nike Academy and finished the competition as one of the 2012 winners. He joined Terrassa in 2012, and later the same year, switched to CE Júpiter. While at Júpiter, he was called up for Catalonia amateur team to play in the 2013 UEFA Regions' Cup, in which Catalonia finished runners up.

Balbi joined Icelandic side KR Reykjavík in 2014 and played for them in qualification for the 2014–15 UEFA Champions League against Scottish side Celtic.

== Personal life ==
Balbi is the younger brother of Sofia Balbi, born in 1990, who is the wife of fellow Uruguayan footballer Luis Suárez. He's the uncle of Suarez's children's Delfina, Benjamin and Lautaro.

== Career statistics ==
=== Club ===
Club	Season	League			Cup		Continental		Other		Total	
Club	Season	Division	Apps	Goals	Apps	Goals	Apps	Goals	Apps	Goals	Apps	Goals
Júpiter	2012–13	Tercera División	1	0	0	0	–		0	0	1	0
KR Reykjavík	2014	Úrvalsdeild	14	0	3 (Note: Appearances in the Icelandic Cup)	2	2 (Note: Appearances in UEFA Champions League qualifying)	0	0	0	19	2
KR Reykjavík	2015	Úrvalsdeild	15	0	2	0	2 (Note: Appearances in UEFA Europa League qualifying)	0	1 (Note: Appearances in the Icelandic Super Cup)	0	20	0
KR Reykjavík	Total		29	0	5	2	4	0	1	0	39	2
Career total			30	0	5	2	4	0	1	0	40	2
