= Alexis André Jr. =

Footballer (born 1997)

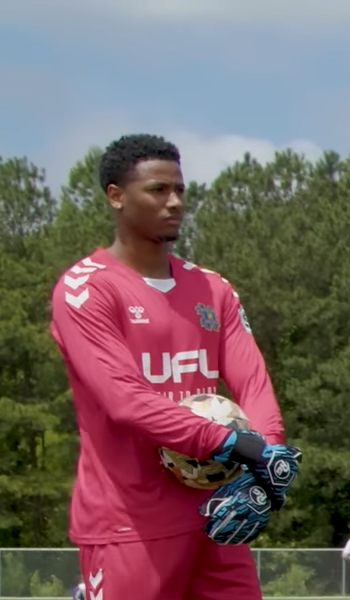
- Alexis André Jr. playing for Hashtag United during TST 2023

Personal information
- Date of birth: 31 May 1997 (age 29)
- Place of birth: Mulhouse, France
- Height: 1.91 m (6 ft 3 in)
- Position: Goalkeeper

Team information
- Current team: RFC Liège
- Number: 1

Youth career
- 2005–2012: Strasbourg
- 2013–2014: Kehler FV
- 2014–2015: Schiltigheim
- 2016–2017: Nike Academy

Senior career*
Years	Team	Apps	(Gls)
2014–2015	SC Schiltigheim	0	(0)
2015–2016	Kehler FV	1	(0)
2017–2021	Bristol Rovers	1	(0)
2017	→ Paulton Rovers (loan)		
2018	→ Tiverton Town (loan)	5	(0)
2019	→ Yate Town (loan)	3	(0)
2019	→ Truro City (loan)	6	(0)
2019	→ Salisbury (loan)		
2020	→ Gloucester City (loan)	0	(0)
2020–2021	→ Salisbury (loan)	2	(0)
2021	Folkestone Invicta	3	(0)
2021–2022	Dover Athletic	12	(0)
2022–2023	Maidenhead United	19	(0)
2023	Hashtag United	3	(0)
2023–2024	Woking	14	(0)
2024–2025	Maidstone United	46	(0)
2025–	RFC Liège	6	(0)
- * Club domestic league appearances and goals as of 19 April 2026

Alexis André Jr. (born 31 May 1997) is a footballer and social media personality who plays as a goalkeeper for Challenger Pro League club RFC Liège. Born in France, he represented Morocco at international level. He is the winner of the 2024 edition and the 12th season of the French reality show Secret Story.

== Club career ==
In 2005, at seven years old, André signed for his first club RC Strasbourg Alsace, after a successful trial when the team didn't have a goalkeeper. He left after seven years at the club.

André joined German football club Kehler FV at their youth academy in 2013. He would later return as a senior player in the Verbandsliga Südbaden, the sixth tier in the German club football pyramid.

André was an unused substitute for Championnat National 3 side Schiltigheim seven times during the 2014–2015 season. He then went to have a spell with the Nike Academy.

On 2 July 2017 André was handed a trial at League One club Bristol Rovers. After a successful trial period with the club, André was signed by Rovers. Following a broken hand from first choice goalkeeper Adam Smith, Sam Slocombe went in goal, with André taking his place on the bench for the first time against Bury. André remained on the bench and on 9 September 2017, starting goalkeeper Slocombe saw red for a professional foul in the 60th minute against Walsall with the teams tied at 1–1. André came on, saving the resultant free kick, before producing a number of saves as Rovers scored in the 87' minute, winning 2–1. At the end of the 2018–19 season, Bristol Rovers exercised a contract extension for him. At the end of the 2020–21 season, André was announced to be one of thirteen players leaving the club at the end of their contract. On 23 November 2017 André joined Paulton Rovers on a one-month loan. On 31 January 2018, he moved out on loan again, this time joining Tiverton Town on a one-month loan deal. On 20 February 2019, André joined Yate Town on a one-month loan deal. In March 2019, he joined Truro City on loan. On 21 October 2020, André joined Salisbury on loan until 9 January 2021. He made his debut three days later in a 6–1 away victory at Dorchester Town.

Following his release from Bristol Rovers, André joined Isthmian Premier Division side Folkestone Invicta, making his debut on 2 October 2021 as his new side caused an FA Cup upset to knock out Gloucester City.

On 27 November 2021, André was announced to have joined National League bottom side Dover Athletic. He made his debut on 28 December in a 3–2 defeat away at Woking. Following relegation, manager Andy Hessenthaler confirmed that the club intended to retain the goalkeeper, however in June 2022 conceded that the club were unlikely to be able to get the money together.

On 3 July 2022, André returned to the National League to join Maidenhead United. André had to wait until 29 October to make his first-team debut for the club, impressing in a 1–0 home victory over Bromley that earned the goalkeeper a place in the National League Team of the Week. He was released at the end of the season.

André signed for Hashtag United as a goalkeeper for the duration of TST 2023, which was played from June 1–4, 2023. TST is a seven-a-side association football tournament played in the United States, featuring 32 teams, like: Borussia Dortmund, Charlotte FC, West Ham United and Hapoel Tel Aviv. The teams compete for a $1 million winner-take-all prize. Hashtag United reached the round-of-16, in which it lost 2–1 to Italian Serie B side Como 1907, which was coached by Cesc Fàbregas. André appeared in three matches as a goalkeeper. On 19 August 2023, André played his first official game for Isthmian League side Hashtag United as a temporary replacement for their injured goalkeeper James Philp. Though not on contract, he appeared in the Isthmian League Premier Division match-up against Bognor Regis Town, where he kept a clean sheet in the 0–0 draw. Having kept two clean sheets in his three appearances for the club, he was voted their August Player of the Month.

On 16 September 2023, André returned to the National League to join Woking on a month-to-month agreement. Alexis made his debut for The Cardinals on 18 November in a 1–0 defeat at home to Oldham. The next day, André announced on his social media profile that he signed a new contract with the club. He went onto 14 times in all competitions before having his contract terminated in April 2024.

On 16 July 2024, André joined National League South side Maidstone United. In March 2025, having kept his twentieth clean sheet of the season, manager George Elokobi labelled him the best goalkeeper in the division. Following defeat in the play-off final, he departed the club at the end of the 2024–25 season, instead opting to relocate to Belgium.

On 21 May 2025, André joined Challenger Pro League club RFC Liège on a two-year deal.

== International career ==
André is eligible to represent France, Guadeloupe and Morocco national football team at senior level.

On 1 October 2018, André was called up to the Morocco under-23 squad for their friendlies against Algeria and Senegal. André appeared twice as an unused substitute against Algeria.

== Personal life ==
André was born in metropolitan France to a Guadaloupean father and a Moroccan mother. After his birth, his parents separated. Abandoned by his mother at the age of 4, he was raised by his father.

== Outside football ==
=== Internet and social media ===
André is an internet celebrity and social media influencer, most notably on TikTok and Instagram, garnering 4.5 million followers and 589 thousand followers respectively. He is signed by social media agency Grail Talent, which is a platform for social media influencers owned by London-based Associated Talent Limited. In April 2024, he participated in the French TV show "Secret Story".

Through his agency, André has partnered with brands like Amazon Prime Video. He appeared in Sky Sports' "Pick the Pro", where Newcastle United manager Eddie Howe and assistant manager Jason Tindall successfully chose him as a pro player among five contestants.

=== Modelling career ===
André is signed to SELECT Model Management, under the SELECT Model London division.

=== Television and films ===
Year	Title	Role	Type
2022	Lovestruck High	Himself	TV series (TV)
2024	Secret Story 12	Himself (Winner)	Reality TV

==== Secret Story ====
In 2024, he won the 12th season of the French reality show Secret Story with 49% of the votes.

== Career statistics ==
As of match played 27 April 2026

Appearances and goals by club, season and competition
Club	Season	League			National Cup		League Cup		Other		Total	
Club	Season	Division	Apps	Goals	Apps	Goals	Apps	Goals	Apps	Goals	Apps	Goals
Kehler FV	2016–17	Verbandsliga Südbaden	No data currently available									
Bristol Rovers	2017–18	League One	1	0	0	0	0	0	0	0	1	0
Bristol Rovers	2018–19	League One	0	0	0	0	0	0	0	0	0	0
Bristol Rovers	2019–20	League One	0	0	0	0	0	0	0	0	0	0
Bristol Rovers	2020–21	League One	0	0	0	0	0	0	0	0	0	0
Bristol Rovers	Total		1	0	0	0	0	0	0	0	1	0
Paulton Rovers (loan)	2017–18	Southern League Division One West	No data currently available									
Tiverton Town (loan)	2017–18	Southern League Premier Division	5	0	—		—		—		5	0
Yate Town (loan)	2018–19	Southern League Division One South	3	0	—		—		—		3	0
Truro City (loan)	2018–19	National League South	6	0	—		—		—		6	0
Salisbury (loan)	2019–20	Southern League Premier Division South	No data currently available									
Gloucester City (loan)	2019–20	National League North	0	0	—		—		—		0	0
Salisbury (loan)	2020–21	Southern League Premier Division South	2	0	0	0	—		2 (Note: Appearances in the FA Trophy)	0	4	0
Folkestone Invicta	2021–22	Isthmian League Premier Division	3	0	3	0	—		0	0	6	0
Dover Athletic	2021–22	National League	12	0	—		—		0	0	12	0
Maidenhead United	2022–23	National League	19	0	1	0	—		3	0	23	0
Hashtag United	2023–24	Isthmian League Premier Division	3	0	0	0	—		0	0	3	0
Woking	2023–24	National League	14	0	0	0	—		0	0	14	0
Maidstone United	2024–25	National League South	46	0	4	0	—		4 (Note: One appearance in FA Trophy, three appearances in National League South play-offs)	0	54	0
RFC Liège	2025–26	Challenger Pro League	6	0	1	0	—		2 (Note: Appearances in Challenger Pro League promotion play-offs)	0	9	0
Career total			120	0	9	0	0	0	11	0	140	0
