= Dimitrios Komnos =

Greek footballer

Personal information
- Date of birth: 1 February 1993 (age 33)
- Place of birth: Magnesia, Greece
- Height: 1.80 m (5 ft 11 in)
- Position: Left-back

Team information
- Current team: MSV Neuruppin
- Number: 3

Youth career
- –2012: Levadiakos
- 2011–2012: Nike Academy

Senior career*
Years	Team	Apps	(Gls)
2012–2014	Olympiacos Volos	10	(0)
2014–2015	Panionios	0	(0)
2015	Lamia	5	(0)
2015	A.E. Kifisia		
2015–2016	Ethnikos Filippiada		
2016–2017	Merseburg 99	25	(2)
2017–2018	VFC Plauen	11	(0)
2018	Neugersdorf	14	(0)
2018–2019	VFC Plauen	23	(5)
2019–2020	Babelsberg 03	5	(0)
2020–2021	FSV Union	7	(0)
2021	SC Bernburg	12	(2)
2022	BSC Süd	15	(0)
2022–	MSV Neuruppin	73	(1)
Medal record
Oberlausitz Neugersdorf
Runner-up	Sachsenpokal	2017–18
- * Club domestic league appearances and goals as of 20:00, 13 June 2026 (UTC)

Dimitrios Komnos (Greek: Δημήτριος Κομνός; born 1 February 1993) is a Greek professional footballer who plays as a left-back for German club MSV Neuruppin.

== Career statistics ==
As of 18 July 2018

Club	Season	League			Cup		Continental		Other		Total	
Club	Season	Division	Apps	Goals	Apps	Goals	Apps	Goals	Apps	Goals	Apps	Goals
Olympiacos Volos	2012–13	Football League	1	0	0	0	–		0	0	1	0
Olympiacos Volos	2016–17	Football League	9	0	2 (Note: Appearance in the Greek Cup)	0	–		0	0	11	0
Olympiacos Volos	Total		10	0	2	0	0	0	0	0	12	0
Lamia	2014–15	Football League	5	0	0	0	–		0	0	5	0
SV Merseburg 99	2016–17	Oberliga Süd	25	2	1 (Note: Appearance in the Saxony-Anhalt Cup)	0	–		0	0	26	2
VFC Plauen	2017–18	Oberliga Süd	11	0	2 (Note: Appearance in the Sachsenpokal)	0	–		0	0	13	0
Oberlausitz Neugersdorf	2017–18	Regionalliga Nordost	14	0	2	0	–		0	0	16	0
Career total			65	2	7	0	–		0	0	72	2
