= Nico Granatowski =

German footballer

Personal information
- Date of birth: 3 June 1991 (age 35)
- Place of birth: Braunschweig, Germany
- Height: 1.72 m (5 ft 8 in)
- Position: Midfielder

Youth career
- 1994–2005: Braunschweiger SC Acosta
- 2005–2010: VfL Wolfsburg

Senior career*
Years	Team	Apps	(Gls)
2010–2014	VfL Wolfsburg II	96	(8)
2014	Sonnenhof Großaspach	6	(0)
2015–2017	Sportfreunde Lotte	48	(4)
2017–2019	SV Meppen	69	(6)
2019–2021	VfL Osnabrück	4	(0)
2020–2021	→ Hansa Rostock (loan)	13	(2)
2021–2022	1. FC Magdeburg	9	(1)
- * Club domestic league appearances and goals as of 8 May 2022

Nico Granatowski (born 3 June 1991) is a German professional footballer who plays as a midfielder.

== Honours ==
1. FC Magdeburg

- 3. Liga: 2021–22
