= José Guidino =

Peruvian footballer (born 1996)

Personal information
- Full name: José André Guidino Otero
- Date of birth: 9 April 1996 (age 30)
- Place of birth: Lima, Peru
- Height: 1.82 m (6 ft 0 in)
- Position: Left back

Team information
- Current team: Cusco
- Number: 25

Youth career
- –2014: Esther Grande
- 2014–2015: Nike Academy

Senior career*
Years	Team	Apps	(Gls)
2016–2017	Deportivo Municipal	51	(0)
2018–2019	Alianza Lima	27	(0)
2020–	Cusco	4	(0)
- * Club domestic league appearances and goals as of 14:16, 6 May 2020 (UTC)

José André Guidino Otero (born April 9, 1996, in Lima) is a Peruvian footballer who currently plays for Cusco FC.

== Club career ==
Guidino started his career with amateur side Esther Grande, before participating in 'The Chance', organised by the Nike Academy, where he was one chosen in the final 2014–2015 squad. He scored the winning goal against a QPR XI for the Academy.

After leaving the Nike Academy, Guidino joined Torneo Descentralizado side Deportivo Municipal, signing a two-year contract.

== Career statistics ==
=== Club ===
As of 26 September 2023.

Club	Division	League			Cup		Continental		Total	
Club	Division	Season	Apps	Goals	Apps	Goals	Apps	Goals	Apps	Goals
Deportivo Municipal	Torneo Descentralizado	2016	26	0	-	-	1	0	27	0
Deportivo Municipal	Torneo Descentralizado	2017	25	0	-	-	1	0	26	0
Deportivo Municipal	Total		51	0	0	0	2	0	53	0
Alianza Lima	Torneo Descentralizado	2018	23	0	-	-	2	0	25	0
Alianza Lima	Liga 1	2019	4	0	1	0	6	0	11	0
Alianza Lima	Total		27	0	1	0	8	0	36	0
Cusco	Liga 1	2020	9	0	-	-	1	0	10	0
Cienciano	Liga 1	2021	2	0	1	0	-	-	3	0
Alianza Atlético	Liga 1	2021	14	1	-	-	-	-	14	1
Ayacucho	Liga 1	2022	13	0	-	-	6	0	19	0
Juan Aurich	Liga 2	2023	17	0	-	-	-	-	17	0
Career total			133	1	2	0	17	0	152	1
