= Maksim Boychuk =

Russian football player

Personal information
- Full name: Maksim Sergeyevich Boychuk
- Date of birth: 17 November 1997 (age 28)
- Place of birth: Balabanovo, Russia
- Height: 1.82 m (6 ft 0 in)
- Position: Forward

Youth career
- 2014: FC Kvant Obninsk
- 2014–2017: Nike Academy

Senior career*
Years	Team	Apps	(Gls)
2017	PFC Spartak Nalchik	10	(0)
2017	FC Kaluga	10	(0)
2018	FC Akron Tolyatti (amateur)		
2019	FC Kvant Obninsk	9	(6)
2019	FC Kolomna	2	(0)
2019	FC Znamya Truda Orekhovo-Zuyevo	4	(1)
2020–2022	FC Kvant Obninsk	39	(6)
- * Club domestic league appearances and goals

Maksim Sergeyevich Boychuk (Russian: Максим Сергеевич Бойчук; born 17 November 1997) is a Russian former football player.

== Club career ==
He made his debut in the Russian Football National League for PFC Spartak Nalchik on 12 March 2017 in a game against FC Baltika Kaliningrad.
