= Secret Story (French TV series) season 12 =

Secret Story
- Season 12
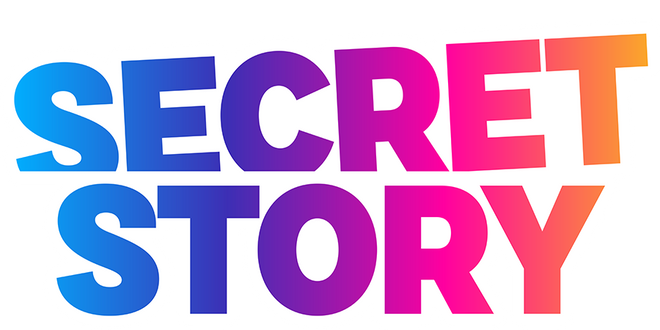
- Hosted by: Christophe Beaugrand
- No. of days: 57
- No. of housemates: 15
- Winner: Alexis André Jr.
- Runner-up: Lou Videau
- Companion show: After Secret

Release
- Original network: TF1; TFX (After Secret)
- Original release: 23 April – 18 June 2024

Season chronology
- ← Previous; Season 11 Next → Season 13

Secret Story 12 is the twelfth season of the French reality television series Secret Story, which is based loosely on the international Big Brother format.

In October 2023, TF1 announced the return of the series, after a seven year absence.

Christophe Beaugrand will return as the presenter having presented the previous three seasons. The season was scheduled for broadcast on 23 April 2024.

== Housemates ==
=== Alexis ===
- Alexis André Jr. is 26. He's from London, United Kingdom. He entered the House on Day 1 with the secret "I was abandoned in a train station at the age of 4".

=== Bruno ===
- Bruno Naprix is 36. He's from Le Plessis-Bouchard, France. He entered the House on Day 1 with the secret "I am an athlete in the upcoming Olympic". He left the House on Day 4 after being evicted by Zoé, Maxence, Lou and Léo who won a power to evict one of their fellow housemates.

=== Cameron ===
- Cameron Djassougue is 23. He's from Paris, France. He entered the House on Day 1 with the secret "I am the creator of the ‘Quoicoubeh’ trend", which became viral on TikTok and other social media and among teenagers in elementary schools, middle schools and highschools.

=== Cassandra ===
- Cassandra Lias is 19. She's from Marseille, France. She entered the House on Day 1 with the secret "I am a Latin dance champion". She left the House on Day 29, evicted by the Secret Master of the House, Lou.

=== Charlène ===
- Charlène di Maria is 26. She's from Cannes, France. She entered the House on Day 1 with her girlfriend Francesca and their secret is "We are a couple". On Day 6, Lou discovered her secret.

=== Francesca ===
- Francesca Piemontese is 28. She's from Verona, Italy and lives in France. She entered the House on Day 1 with her girlfriend Charlène and their secret is "We are a couple". On Day 6, Lou discovered her secret.

=== Justine ===
- Justine Aucello is 26. She's from Besançon, France. Her secret is that she entered the House on Day 2. To help her with the secret, an actress entered the House on Day 1 and pretended to be the real Justine and they switched secretly overnight.

=== Kelyan ===
- Kelyan Blanc is 36. He's from Gagny, France. He entered the House on Day 1 with the secret "I am the French voice of the world's most famous wizard (Harry Potter)".

=== Léo ===
- Léo Nadler is 22. He's from Toulouse, France. He entered the House on Day 1 with Lou and their secret is "We are not twins".

=== Lou ===
- Lou Videau is 21. She's from Marseille, France. She entered the House on Day 1 with Léo and their secret is "We are not twins".

=== Maxence ===
- Maxence Mellerowicz is 29. He's from Madrid, Spain. He entered the House on Day 1 with Perrine and their secret is "We are the house thieves". They must steal money from the other housemates's pots and find coins hidden everywhere in the House in order to cash their pot, that unlike the other housemates, starts with €0,00.

=== Maxime ===
- Maxime Croisé is 23. He's from Waterloo, Belgium. He entered the House on Day 1 with the secret "I am an international magic champion".

=== Perrine ===
- Perrine Nicolas is 22. She's from Madrid, Spain. She entered the House with Maxence on Day 1 and their secret is "We are the house thieves". They must steal money from the other housemates's pots and find coins hidden everywhere in the House in order to cash their pot, that unlike the other housemates, starts with €0,00.

=== Ulysse ===
- Ulysse Leconte is 18. He's from Levallois-Perret, France. He entered the House on Day 1 with the secret "The viewers discovered me on the first season of Secret Story"

=== Zoé ===
- Zoé Brunet is 24. She's from Namur, Belgium. She entered the House on Day 1 with the secret "I participated to Miss Universe".

== Secrets ==
| Name | Age | Residence | Secret | Discovered by | Status |
|---|---|---|---|---|---|
| Alexis André Jr. | 27 | London | "I was abandoned in a train station at the age of 4" | Zoé (Day 31) | Winner |
| Lou Videau | 21 | Marseille | "We are not twins" (with Léo) | Charlène (Day 21) | Runner-up |
| Léo Nadler | 22 | Toulouse | "We are not twins" (with Lou) | Charlène (Day 21) | 3rd Place |
| Maxence Mellerowicz | 30 | Madrid, Spain | "We are the house thieves" (with Perrine) | Léo (Day 50) | 4th Place |
| Perrine Nicolas | 22 | Madrid, Spain | "We are the house thieves" (with Maxence) | Léo (Day 50) | Evicted |
| Kelyan Blanc | 36 | Gagny | "I am the French voice of the world's most famous wizard (Harry Potter)" | Maxence half secret (Day 49) | Evicted |
| Zoé Brunet | 24 | Namur, Belgium | "I participated in Miss Universe" | Maxime (Day 9) and Alexis (Day 45) | Evicted |
| Justine Aucello | 26 | Besançon | "I entered the House on Day 2" | Perrine (Day 45) | Evicted |
| Francesca Piemontese | 28 | Verona, Italy | "We are a couple" (with Charlène) | Lou (Day 6) | Evicted |
| Charlène di Maria | 26 | Cannes | "We are a couple" (with Francesca) | Lou (Day 6) | Evicted |
| Cameron Djassougue | 23 | Paris | "I am the creator of the 'Quoicoubeh' trend" | Léo (Day 55) | Evicted |
| Cassandra Lias | 19 | Marseille | "I am a Latin dance champion" | Maxence (Day 55) | Evicted |
| Ulysse Leconte | 18 | Levallois-Perret | "The viewers discovered me on the first season of Secret Story" | Lou (Day 55) | Evicted |
| Maxime Croisé | 23 | Waterloo, Belgium | "I am an international magic champion" | Undiscovered | Evicted |
| Bruno Naprix | 36 | Le Plessis-Bouchard | "I am an athlete in the upcoming Olympics" | Undiscovered | Evicted |

== Nominations ==
After the other Housemates nominated two other Housemates, the Master of House would nominate directly one Housemate to join the other two nominees.

| | Day 4 | Week 2 | Week 3 | Week 4 | Week 5 | | Week 6 | Week 7 | Week 8 | | | Week 9 | |
| | Day 4 | Week 2 | Week 3 | Week 4 | Day 28 | Day 30 | Week 6 | Week 7 | Day 48 | Day 49 | Day 53 | Final | |
|---|---|---|---|---|---|---|---|---|---|---|---|---|---|
| Master of the House | None | Cassandra | Perrine | Cameron | Lou | None | | | | | | | |
| Alexis | In Danger | Maxence; Lou | Lou; Léo | Charlène | In Danger | Perrine; Kelyan | Charlène; Francesca | Zoé to immune | Perrine | Finalist | Léo | Winner (Day 57) | |
| Lou | Bruno | Charlène; Ulysse | Ulysse; Justine | Charlène | Cassandra | Secret; Room | Kelyan; Alexis | Maxence to immune | Zoé | Kelyan | Léo | Runner-Up (Day 57) | |
| Léo | Bruno | Charlène; Ulysse | Ulysse; Justine | Charlène | In Danger | Zoé; Alexis | Charlène; Francesca | Maxence to immune | Zoé | Kelyan | Lou | Third Place (Day 57) | |
| Maxence | Bruno | Ulysse; Charlène | Ulysse(x2); Justine | Charlène | In Danger | Zoé; Cameron | Charlène; Francesca | Kelyan to immune | Zoé | Kelyan | Léo | Fourth Place (Day 57) | |
| Perrine | In Danger | Charlène; Ulysse | Ulysse | Charlène(x2) | In Danger | Alexis; Zoé | Charlène; Francesca | Maxence to immune | Zoé | Kelyan | Lou | Evicted (Day 53) | |
| Kelyan | In Danger | Lou; Maxence | Ulysse; Justine | Charlène | In Danger | Zoé; Alexis | Francesca; Alexis | Maxence to immune | Zoé | Kelyan | Evicted by housemates (Day 49) | | |
| Zoé | Bruno | Lou; Maxence | Lou; Léo | Charlène | In Danger | Kelyan; Perrine | Kelyan; Perrine | Alexis to immune | Perrine (x2) | Evicted by housemates (Day 48) | | | Guest |
| Justine | In Danger | Lou; Maxence | Lou; Léo | Nominated | In Danger | Cameron; Alexis | Kelyan; Perrine | Alexis to immune | Evicted (Day 46) | | | | Guest |
| Francesca | In Danger | Lou; Maxence | Lou; Léo | Alexis | In Danger | Cameron; Alexis | Kelyan; Perrine | Evicted (Day 39) | | | | | |
| Charlène | In Danger | Lou; Maxence | Léo; Lou | Alexis | In Danger | Cameron; Alexis | Perrine; Lou | Evicted (Day 39) | | | | | |
| Cameron | In Danger | Maxence; Lou | Léo; Lou | Justine | In Danger | Perrine; Kelyan | Evicted (Day 32) | | | | | | |
| Cassandra | In Danger | Maxime | Lou; Léo | Charlène | In Danger | Evicted by housemates (Day 29) | | | | | | | |
| Ulysse | In Danger | Lou; Maxence | Lou; Léo | Evicted (Day 18) | | | | | | | | | |
| Maxime | In Danger | Charlène; Ulysse | Evicted (Day 11) | | | | | | | | | | |
| Bruno | In Danger | Evicted by housemates (Day 4) | | | | | | | | | | | |
| Nominations Notes | 1, 2, 3 | 4 | 5, 6 | | | | | | | | | | |
| Up for Eviction | Alexis; Bruno; Cameron; Cassandra; Charlène; Francesca; Justine; Kelyan; Maxime; Perrine; Ulysse | Lou; Maxence; Maxime | Léo; Lou; Ulysse | Charlène; Justine; Lou; Zoé | Alexis; Cameron; Cassandra; Charlène; Francesca; Justine; Kelyan; Maxence; Léo; Perrine; Zoé | Alexis; Cameron; Zoé | Charlène; Francesca; Kelyan; Perrine | Alexis; Kelyan; Justine; Zoé | Alexis; Kelyan; Lou; Léo; Maxence; Perrine; Zoé | Kelyan; Lou; Léo; Maxence; Perrine | Léo; Perrine | Alexis; Léo; Lou; Maxence | |
| Evicted | Bruno; Zoé, Maxence, Léo and Lou's choice to evict (out of 11) | Maxime; Fewest votes to save | Ulysse; Fewest votes to save | Lou; Most votes to fake evict | Cassandra; Lou's choice to evict | Cameron; Fewest votes to save | Charlène, Francesca; Fewest votes to save | Justine; Fewest votes to save | Zoé; 5 of 8 votes to evict | Kelyan; 5 of 5 votes to evict | Perrine; Fewest votes to save | Maxence; 3% to win | Léo; 7% to win |
| Evicted | Bruno; Zoé, Maxence, Léo and Lou's choice to evict (out of 11) | Maxime; Fewest votes to save | Ulysse; Fewest votes to save | Lou; Most votes to fake evict | Cassandra; Lou's choice to evict | Cameron; Fewest votes to save | Charlène, Francesca; Fewest votes to save | Justine; Fewest votes to save | Zoé; 5 of 8 votes to evict | Kelyan; 5 of 5 votes to evict | Perrine; Fewest votes to save | Lou; 41% to win | Alexis; 49% to win |

=== Results ===
| Weeks | Nominated | Evicted |
|---|---|---|
| Week 1 | Alexis, Bruno, Cameron, Cassandra, Charlène, Francesca, Justine, Kelyan, Maxime, Perrine, Ulysse | Bruno |
| Week 2 | Lou, Maxence, Maxime | Maxime |
| Week 3 | Léo, Lou, Ulysse | Ulysse |
| Week 4 | Who should join the secret room? Charlène, Justine, Lou, Zoé | Lou |
| Week 5 | Alexis, Cameron, Cassandra, Charlène, Francesca, Justine, Kelyan, Léo, Maxence, Perrine, Zoé | Cassandra |
| Week 5 | Alexis, Cameron, Zoé | Cameron |
| Week 6 | Charlène, Perrine / Francesca, Kelyan | Charlène et Francesca |
| Week 7 | Alexis, Justine, Kelyan, Zoé | Justine |
| Week 8 | Who do you want to eliminate from the House of Secrets? Alexis, Kelyan, Léo, Lou, Maxence, Perrine, Zoé | Zoé |
| Week 8 | Who do you want to sacrifice? Kelyan, Léo, Lou, Maxence, Perrine | Kelyan |
| Week 8 | Léo, Perrine | Perrine |
| Week 9 - Finale | Who need has to win Secret Story? Alexis (49%), Lou (41%), Léo (7%), Maxence (3%) | Maxence, Léo, Lou |

=== Notes ===
^Note 1: In the very first day, Zoé and Maxence discovered that the new Voix is a fake one, and that they were living in a fake house and that is a secret the Housemates had in common.
^Note 2: The Housemates were informed they had a secret in common they had to find. If somebody found the secret in common to all the Housemates, they would be safe from Eviction that was set for Day 4.
^Note 3: On Day 3, Lou and Léo found the secret in common and were safe from eviction along with Zoé and Maxence. On Day 4, the four of them had to decide who to vote out of the House permanently. They decided to evict Bruno.
^Note 4: In Week 2, Cassandra won the weekly Master of the House challenge, therefore, she was immune and won the power to nominate one Housemate directly.
^Note 5: Maxence won the Nominees' Revenge challenge. He won a double vote for the nominations and decided to nominate Ulysse with it.
^Note 6: In Week 3, Perrine won the weekly Master of the House challenge, therefore, she was immune and won the power to nominate one Housemate directly.
