= Conor Branson =

English footballer

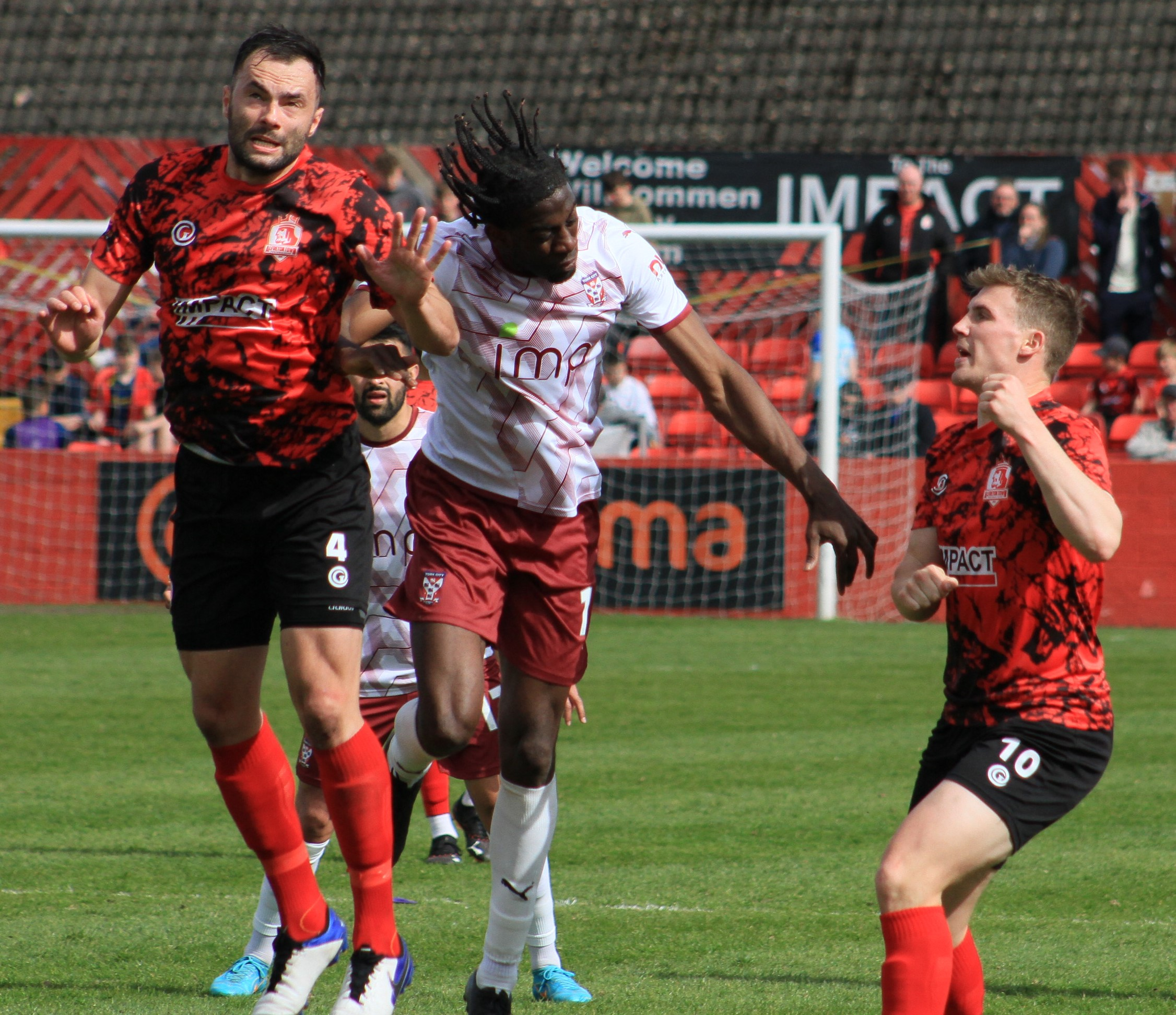
- Conor Branson (left) playing for Alfreton Town in 2022.

Personal information
- Date of birth: 14 November 1991 (age 34)
- Place of birth: Pontefract, England
- Position: Centre back

Team information
- Current team: Farsley Celtic

Youth career
- 2009–2011: Barnsley
- 2011–2012: Nike Academy

College career
Years	Team	Apps	(Gls)
2013–2015	Charleston Golden Eagles	64	(18)

Senior career*
Years	Team	Apps	(Gls)
2010–2011	Barnsley	0	(0)
2011–2012	Guiseley	8	(0)
2016	Pittsburgh Riverhounds	14	(1)
2018–2019	Bradford Park Avenue	40	(12)
2019	Altrincham	8	(0)
2019–2023	Alfreton Town	116	(11)
2023–	Farsley Celtic	56	(3)

Managerial career
- 2015–2016: Charleston Golden Eagles (assistant)
- 2017–2018: Marshall Thundering Herd (assistant)
- * Club domestic league appearances and goals as of 08:21, 30 June 2025 (UTC)

Conor Branson (born 14 November 1991) is an English footballer who plays as a defender for Farsley Celtic.

He has also spent time coaching and holds a UEFA B Licence qualification.

== Playing career ==
=== Youth and college ===
Branson was a first-year scholar at Barnsley F.C. in 2009. After captaining the academy in 2009, he was promoted to the first team in 2010 on a 1-year contract. About Branson, Barnsley manager Nick Daws said, "Conor has done really well as the captain of the academy. He is a leader, a talker and an organizer. He needs to work on his game like everyone does but he is a real prospect." During the 2010/11 Championship season, he was on the bench for three first team matches but did not make an appearance. He was released by Barnsley, along with four other players, in November 2011. Upon his release from Barnsley he played for, and captained, the Nike Football Academy team in 2011/12. Following that season, he moved to the United States to play college soccer for the Golden Eagles of the University of Charleston. Over his three seasons with the team, he tallied 18 goals in 64 appearances. In 2014 and 2015 he was named Defensive Player of the Year for the Mountain East Conference and led the Golden Eagles to the NCAA national semifinals in his last season. In 2015 and 2015 he also helped lead the team to league titles while being named an Academic All-American those seasons.

=== Professional ===
Branson played for Guiseley of the National League North, the sixth tear of English football, during the 2011/12 season. He stayed with the club until September 2012 when he began attending the University of Charleston. In total he made eight appearances for the club. After college, Branson had trials with DC United and Columbus Crew, both of Major League Soccer.

In March 2016 it was announced that Branson had signed for the Pittsburgh Riverhounds of the United Soccer League a few days before the opening match of the 2016 USL season. He made his debut for the club on 2 April in the team's opening match to the Rochester Rhinos, coming on as a 68th-minute substitute for Michael Green. It was announced that Branson and the club mutually parted ways in August 2016 after making 14 appearances and scoring one goal for the club.

In the summer of 2018, he returned to the UK and joined National League North side Bradford Park Avenue. Branson finished his first season with the club with twelve goals and was named as the club's Manager's Player of the Year. On 19 June 2019, Branson left Bradford to join Altrincham.

In May 2023, Branson signed for Farsley Celtic after four seasons with Alfreton Town.

== Coaching career ==
Branson left Pittsburgh return to the University of Charleston as an assistant coach. He then had a spell coaching at Marshall University for the 2017 season.

== Career statistics ==
As of 4 August 2016

Appearances and goals by club, season and competition
Club	Season	League			Cup		Continental		Total	
Club	Season	Division	Apps	Goals	Apps	Goals	Apps	Goals	Apps	Goals
Barnsley	2010–11	The Championship	0	0	0	0	0	0	0	0
Guiseley	2011–12	National League North	8	0	0	0	0	0	8	0
Pittsburgh Riverhounds	2016	USL	14	1	0	0	0	0	14	1
Career total			22	1	0	0	0	0	22	1
