= Napapon Sripratheep =

Thai footballer (born 1993)

Personal information
- Full name: Napapon Sripratheep
- Date of birth: 10 May 1993 (age 33)
- Place of birth: Bangkok, Thailand
- Height: 1.64 m (5 ft 4 1/2 in)
- Position: Midfielder

Team information
- Current team: MH Nakhon Si
- Number: 8

Youth career
- 2008–2010: Ratwinit Bangkaeo School
- 2011: Osotspa

Senior career*
Years	Team	Apps	(Gls)
2012–2015	Muangthong United	0	(0)
2013	→ Nakhon Nayok (loan)	10	(0)
2014	→ Rayong United (loan)	9	(1)
2014	→ Customs United (loan)	11	(1)
2015	→ Pattaya United (loan)	7	(0)
2015–2018	Krabi	49	(5)
2019	Nakhon Pathom United		
2019	Thai Honda		
2022–	MH Nakhon Si	2	(0)

International career
2011	Thailand U19	3	(0)
- * Club domestic league appearances and goals as of 5 September 2015

Napapon Sripratheep (Thai: นภพล ศรีประทีป, born May 10, 1993) is a Thai professional footballer who plays as a midfielder for Thailand Amateur League club MH Nakhon Si.

== Club career ==
Napapon Sripratheep is one of the 16 youths player who representing for Asia to join the program, Nike The Chance has traveled to training with FC Barcelona in 2012.
