= Farat Toku =

German football manager and former footballer

Personal information
- Date of birth: 20 April 1980 (age 46)
- Place of birth: Bochum, West Germany
- Height: 1.70 m (5 ft 7 in)
- Position: Midfielder

Senior career*
Years	Team	Apps	(Gls)
1997–1999	WSV Bochum		
1999–2001	VfL Bochum II		
2001–2004	SG Wattenscheid 09		
2004–2005	FC Sachsen Leipzig		
2006–2007	SC Preußen Münster		
2007–2011	SG Wattenscheid 09		
2012–2013	TuS Heven		

Managerial career
- 2011–2012: WSV Bochum (player-manager)
- 2013: Wuppertaler SV (assistant)
- 2013–2014: SV Wilhelmshaven
- 2014–2019: SG Wattenscheid 09
- 2022: FC Viktoria 1889 Berlin
- 2023: Alanyaspor (assistant)
- 2023–2025: SV Rödinghausen
- * Club domestic league appearances and goals

Farat Toku (born 20 April 1980) is a German-Yezidi football manager and former footballer. A midfielder, he played in the lower German leagues for clubs including SG Wattenscheid 09 and SC Preußen Münster. As a manager he coached Wattenscheid in the Regionalliga West from 2015 to 2019, FC Viktoria 1889 Berlin in the 3. Liga in 2022 and SV Rödinghausen from 2023 to 2025.

== Early life ==
Toku was born in Bochum and grew up with seven siblings in a working-class family that had emigrated to Germany in the 1970s. He is a member of the Yezidi religious minority.

He trained as a dental technician, worked with people with autism, and later studied psychology before turning to football full-time.

== Playing career ==
Toku played in the youth teams of SG Werne and WSV Bochum, which merged, and in WSV Bochum's senior side from 1997 to 1999. In 1999 he joined the reserve team of VfL Bochum and made five Regionalliga appearances in the 1999–2000 season.

He played for SG Wattenscheid 09 from 2001 to 2004. In that time he made 31 Regionalliga Nord appearances, 5 in 2002–03 and 26 in 2003–04, and scored once. He then joined FC Sachsen Leipzig for 2004–05. An ankle operation kept him out of play from May 2005 to June 2006. In 2006 he signed for Preußen Münster and made 22 Oberliga Westfalen appearances in 2006–07.

Wattenscheid's long-time owner Klaus Steilmann wanted him back, and Toku returned in 2007 even though it meant dropping down a division. He stayed until 2011. From 2011 to 2012 he was player-manager of WSV Bochum, and in the first half of 2013 he played for TuS Heven.

== Managerial career ==
=== Wuppertaler SV and Wilhelmshaven ===
In April 2013 Toku became assistant manager to Reinhold Franz at Wuppertaler SV. In July 2013 he became head coach of SV Wilhelmshaven in the Regionalliga Nord and left in June 2014. His record there was 7 wins, 12 draws and 16 defeats in 35 league and cup matches.

=== SG Wattenscheid 09 ===
In December 2014 Wattenscheid, then in the Regionalliga West, appointed Toku to succeed Christoph Klöpper. He was 34. He began work on 1 January 2015. The club had 16 points at the winter break, and Toku kept it in the league only on the final matchday.

Wattenscheid's budget was among the smallest in the league, and Toku relied on young players. By 2018 he was also the club's sporting director, and ten players left before the 2018–19 season.

Under Toku, Wattenscheid won the Westphalia Cup. The club lost 2–1 to 1. FC Heidenheim in the first round of the 2016–17 DFB-Pokal on 21 August 2016. His record was 58 wins, 39 draws and 57 defeats in 154 league and cup matches. His tenure ended on 23 October 2019, when Wattenscheid withdrew from the Regionalliga West.

=== Coaching licence ===
Toku's lack of a Fußball-Lehrer licence had previously prevented moves to higher levels. Preußen Münster showed interest in him in early 2019 but chose a licensed coach. After earlier unsuccessful applications, he was accepted onto the DFB's Fußball-Lehrer course in March 2020 and completed it in May 2021. He later did observation placements in Belgium, the Netherlands, Austria, Poland, Spain and Turkey, including at AZ Alkmaar, Sevilla, Athletic Bilbao, Cracovia Kraków and Schalke 04. In November 2019 he said he would do placements in Poland and then Slovakia.

=== Viktoria Berlin ===
On 3 March 2022 Viktoria Berlin appointed Toku head coach in the 3. Liga, replacing interim coach David Pietrzyk, who stayed on as an assistant. The club had not previously needed a head coach with the pro licence that the 3. Liga requires. Viktoria, in its first 3. Liga season, had gone winless from late October to early April. In Toku's first six matches the team took eight points and won against 1. FC Magdeburg and Borussia Dortmund II.

On 21 May 2022 Viktoria beat VSG Altglienicke 2–1 in the Berlin Cup final. Both goals came late in the match, and Toku stepped down afterwards. Viktoria played in the Regionalliga Nordost in 2022–23. Toku managed the team in 10 matches, with 3 wins, 2 draws and 5 defeats.

=== Alanyaspor and Rödinghausen ===
On 1 July 2023 Toku became assistant coach at Alanyaspor in Turkey's Süper Lig. He ended his contract in October 2023 to take a head coaching job in Germany.

SV Rödinghausen, in the Regionalliga West, appointed him as successor to Carsten Rump, who had been dismissed in mid-October. Jan Stromberg had been in charge on an interim basis. He started on 31 October 2023. In late February 2025 the club announced that his contract would not be extended after the season. In April 2025, six matchdays before the end of the season, Rödinghausen released him after a 1–4 defeat to FC Gütersloh. The DFB lists his term as ending on 12 April 2025, with Stromberg taking over two days later. He managed 22 wins, 14 draws and 13 defeats in 49 matches.

=== Managerial record ===
Team	From	To	P	W	D	L
SV Wilhelmshaven	1 July 2013	30 June 2014	35	7	12	16
SG Wattenscheid 09	1 January 2015	23 October 2019	154	58	39	57
FC Viktoria 1889 Berlin	3 March 2022	30 June 2022	10	3	2	5
SV Rödinghausen	31 October 2023	12 April 2025	49	22	14	13
Total			248	90	67	91

== Humanitarian work ==
In 2014 Toku visited Iraq, where he saw the situation of Yezidis who had fled the genocide. Serdar Yüksel, a SPD member of the Landtag of North Rhine-Westphalia, had the idea of organising help, and Toku joined him.

Construction of the Flüchtlingscamp Ruhrgebiet ("Ruhr area refugee camp") in the camp at Dohuk began in December 2014. Caritas supported the project at the start. Donations from individuals, municipalities and cities in the Ruhr area replaced tents with residential containers, each named after its donor city, such as Recklinghausen and Herne.

By November 2016 the whole camp housed 5,500 people, about 1,000 of them in the Ruhr area containers. The project included a bakery where residents learned to bake bread and schools, and a kindergarten was planned. Toku had visited three times by then, the latest trip starting right after a Wattenscheid match. He has also taken part in charity matches and is a member of the Arbeiterwohlfahrt.

== See also ==
- List of Yezidi people
