= Delvin Pinheiro Frederico =

Dutch footballer

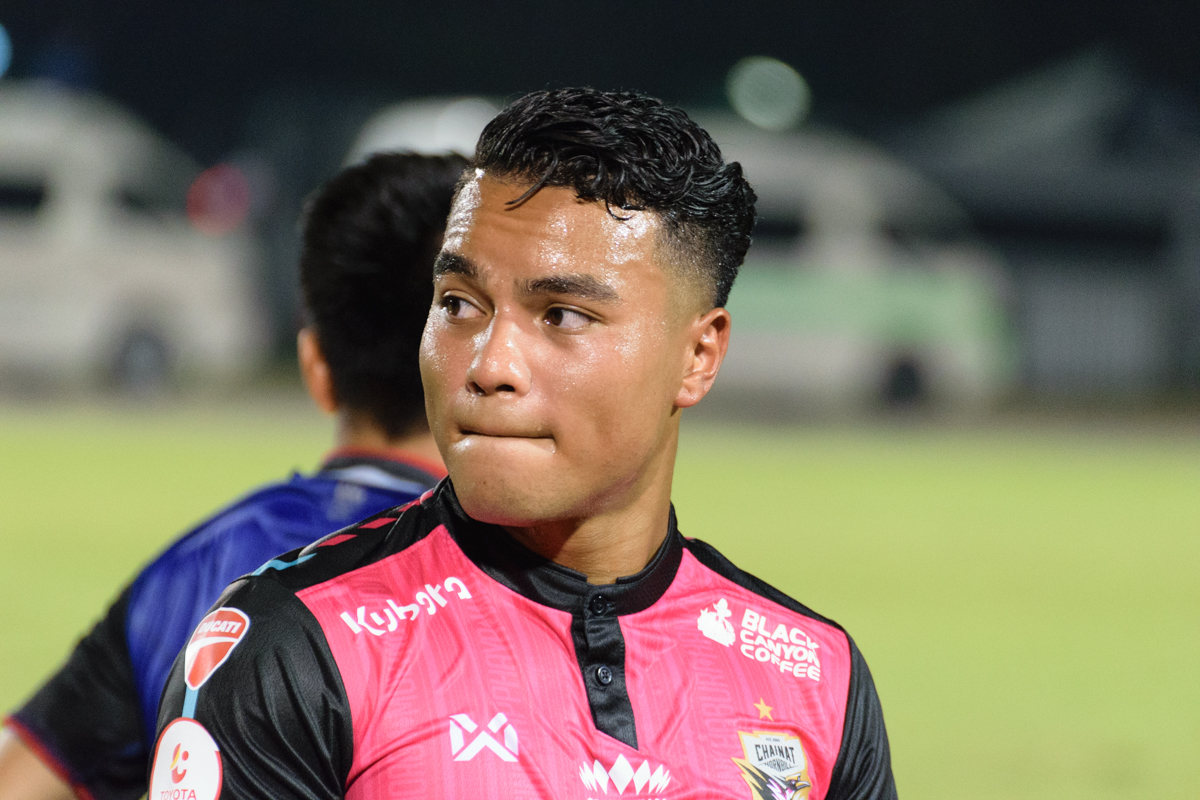

Personal information
- Date of birth: 26 September 1995 (age 31)
- Place of birth: Rotterdam, Netherlands
- Height: 1.74 m (5 ft 8 1/2 in)
- Positions: Right back; winger

Youth career
- 2010: Sparta Rotterdam
- 2011–2012: Excelsior Maassluis
- 2013: Nike Academy

Senior career*
Years	Team	Apps	(Gls)
2014–2015	CP Cacereño	19	(0)
2015	Kozakken Boys	15	(0)
2016–2017	HBS Craeyenhout	22	(0)
2017	Buriram United	0	(0)
2018	Chainat Hornbill	5	(0)
2018–2019	HBS Craeyenhout	17	(0)
2020	HBS Craeyenhout	1	(0)
2021–2022	RKVV Westlandia	15	(1)
2023–2024	SC Feyenoord	16	(0)
2024–	IFC	0	(0)
- * Club domestic league appearances and goals as of 6:24, 12 February 2019 (UTC)

Delvin Pinheiro Frederico (Thai: เดลวิน ปินเฮโร; born 26 September 1995), is a Dutch professional footballer who plays as a right back or winger.

== Career ==
Born in Rotterdam, Pinheiro Frederico played youth football for Sparta Rotterdam. After a spell in Dutch amateur football, including with HBS Craeyenhout, he turned professional in Thailand, playing with Buriram United and Chainat Hornbill.

After returning to HBS Craeyenhout in August 2018, he left the club again in May 2019.

== Personal life ==
Pinheiro Frederico was born in the Netherlands to a Cape Verdean father and Thai mother.
