= Kayro Flores Heatley =

British/Nicaraguan footballer

Personal information
- Date of birth: 1 April 1998 (age 28)
- Place of birth: Rome, Italy
- Height: 1.84 m (6 ft 0 in)
- Position: Forward

Team information
- Current team: SSD Città di Gela
- Number: 9

Senior career*
Years	Team	Apps	(Gls)
2016	Lupa Castelli Romani	3	(0)
2017	Nuorese	9	(0)
2017–2018	Südtirol	17	(0)
2018–2019	Cavese	22	(4)
2019–2020	Arzignano	14	(1)
2020–2021	Piacenza	8	(1)
2021	Fano	10	(0)
2021–2022	Roma City	22	(6)
2022–2023	Romana	27	(4)
2023	Anzio	13	(2)
2023–2024	Real Forte Querceta	17	(3)
2024	Albenga	0	(0)
2024–2025	Fossano	7	(2)
2025–2026	Sondrio	5	(0)
2026	Gela	15	(3)
2026–	Modica	0	(0)
- * Club domestic league appearances and goals as of 26 September 2026

Kayro Flores Heatley (born 1 April 1998) is an Italian footballer who plays for Serie D club Gela.

== Career ==
Measuring 184 cm tall, Flores was part of the Lazio youth program before switching to the Nike Academy until January 2016 when he was spotted by Lupa Castelli Roma who signed him.

Wearing the colors of Serie D club Nuorese in 2017, the Nicaraguan featured 9 times there, moving to Südtirol after a few months.

On 12 August 2018 he signed with Serie C club Cavese.

On 23 August 2019, he moved to Arzignano on a 2-year contract.

On 8 August 2020 he signed a one-year contract with an extension option with Piacenza.

On 19 January 2021 he joined Fano.

On 2 November 2021 he moved to Atletico Fiuggi in Serie D.

== Personal life ==
Flores is of a heterogeneous family background. He was born in Rome Italy. His father, Kayro Flores Senior is Nicaraguan, his mother, Christine Heatley is English, and his grandfather was Costa Rican. Kayro Junior, due to his mix of cultures and nationalities (British, Nicaraguan, Costa Rican and Italian) is eligible to represent internationally either one of these countries according to FIFA rules.
