= Eichbaum =

German beer brewing company

Privatbrauerei Eichbaum
- Interactive map of Privatbrauerei Eichbaum
- Type: GmbH & Co. KG
- Location: Mannheim, Germany
- Coordinates: 49°29′45″N 8°29′23″E
- Opened: 1679
- Closed: July 2026
- Key people: Uwe Aichele; Frank Reifel
- Owner: Actris GmbH
- Employees: 240
- Website: eichbaum.de

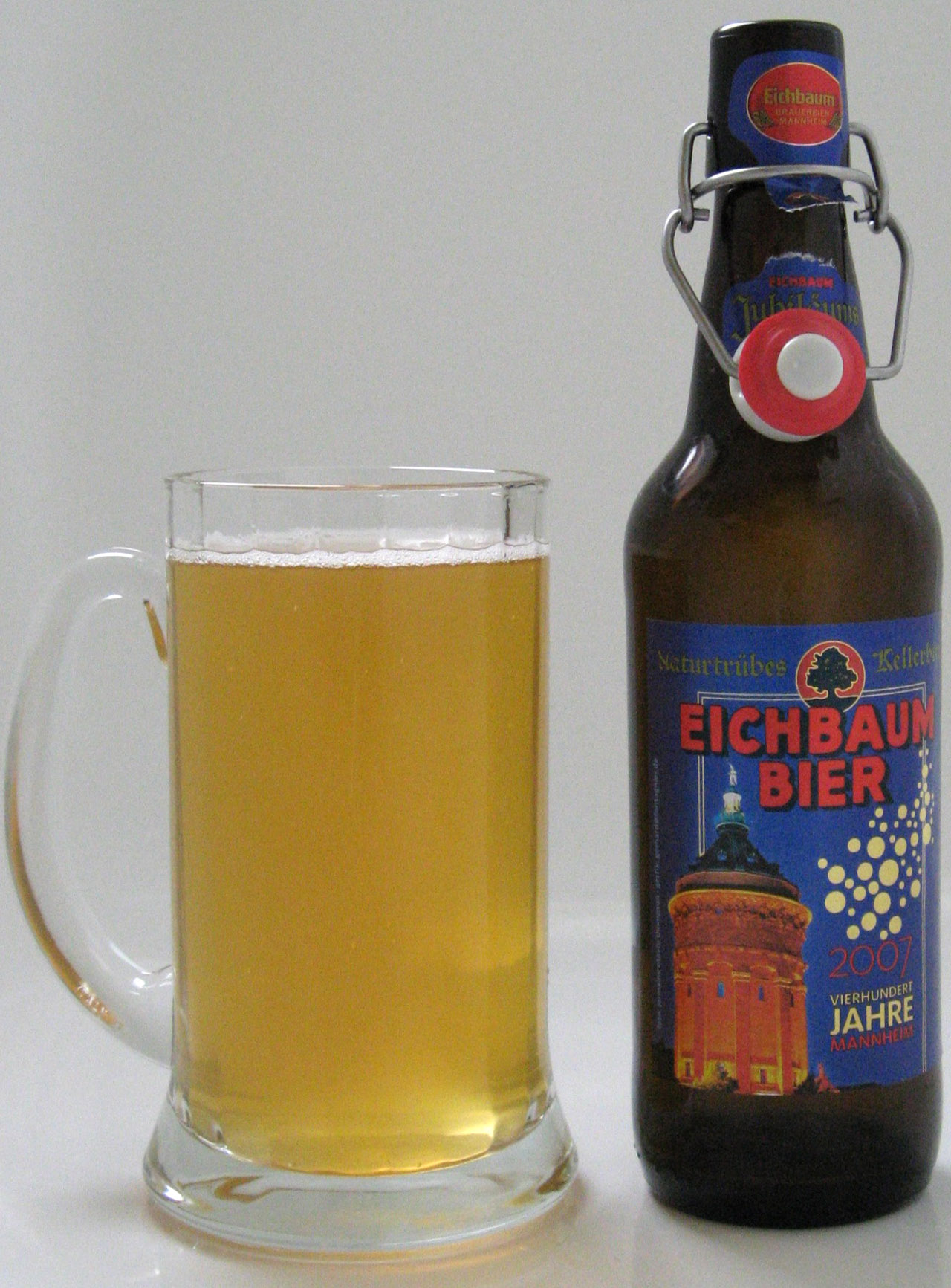
A kellerbier commemorating the 400th anniversary of Mannheim

The Eichbaum beer brewing company was located in Mannheim, Baden-Württemberg in Germany. It was founded in 1679 by Mannheim's Councillor Jean du Chêne (which means "Oak tree", or "Eichbaum" in German).

Today, the Eichbaum brewing company is owned by Actris AG. Dietmar Hopp, one founder of SAP AG, also owns Actris.

In October 2025, the company filed for bankruptcy and despite a recovery plan was forced to shut down production in July 2026.
