= Thorben Deters =

German footballer (born 1995)

Personal information
- Full name: Thorben-Johannes Deters
- Date of birth: 20 August 1995 (age 31)
- Place of birth: Meppen, Germany
- Height: 1.72 m (5 ft 8 in)
- Position: Midfielder

Team information
- Current team: SV Meppen
- Number: 14

Youth career
- –2005: SF Schwefingen
- 2005–2014: SV Meppen

Senior career*
Years	Team	Apps	(Gls)
2014–2019	SV Meppen	61	(4)
2019	Fortuna Düsseldorf II	2	(0)
2019–2020	LSK Hansa	22	(8)
2020–2021	VfB Lübeck	34	(2)
2021–2025	Preußen Münster	71	(14)
2023	Preußen Münster II	1	(0)
2025–	SV Meppen	30	(9)
- * Club domestic league appearances and goals as of 20 June 2026

Thorben-Johannes Deters (born 20 August 1995) is a German footballer who plays as a midfielder for SV Meppen.

== Club career ==
During his time with Preußen Münster from 2021 to 2025, Deters contributed to their two promotions, to 3. Liga and then to 2. Bundesliga.

On 20 June 2025, Deters returned to SV Meppen in Regionalliga.

== Personal life ==
Thorben is the son of Bernd Deters, who also played for SV Meppen as a defender for the entirety of his senior career.

== Honours ==
Preußen Münster

- Regionalliga West: 2022–23
