= DFB =

DFB may refer to:

== Music ==
- Dem Franchize Boyz, an Atlanta hip hop group
- Dysfunctional Family BBQ, a New York festival

== Sport ==
- DFB-Pokal, a football cup competition in Germany

== Organisations ==
- Furka Steam Railway (German: Dampfbahn Furka-Bergstrecke), Switzerland
- German Football Association (German: Deutscher Fußball-Bund), a sport governing body
- Dublin Fire Brigade, Ireland

== Science and technology ==
- Decafluorobutane, a fluorocarbon gas
- Dfb, Köppen climate classification for a humid continental climate
- Distributed-feedback laser

== Other uses ==
- Deerfield Beach, Florida, a city in the United States
