= Daniel Scherning =

German footballer and manager

Personal information
- Full name: Daniel Scherning
- Date of birth: 29 October 1983 (age 43)
- Place of birth: Paderborn, Germany
- Height: 1.89 m (6 ft 2 in)
- Position: Forward

Youth career
- SV Heide Paderborn
- –2002: SC Paderborn

Senior career*
Years	Team	Apps	(Gls)
2002–2005	SC Paderborn	25	(1)
2005–2006	SC Pfullendorf	20	(0)
2006–2007	Arminia Bielefeld II	34	(22)
2007	SC Verl	13	(1)
2008	Arminia Bielefeld II	14	(7)
2008–2009	Schalke 04 II		
Total		106	(31)

Managerial career
- 2012–2016: Arminia Bielefeld II
- 2021–2022: VfL Osnabrück
- 2022–2023: Arminia Bielefeld
- 2023–2025: Eintracht Braunschweig
- 2025–2026: Wehen Wiesbaden
- * Club domestic league appearances and goals

Daniel Scherning (born 29 October 1983) is a German retired footballer who played as a forward, who last managed Wehen Wiesbaden.

== Playing career ==
He spent the majority of his playing time in Germany, having two spells at Arminia Bielefeld II.

== Managerial career ==
Scherning started his coaching career as an assistant coach under Armin Perrey at Arminia Bielefeld II in January 2010; when the latter stepped down in the summer of 2012, Scherning was announced as his replacement. During his four year stay, he led his team to the championship in the 2013/14 season. Since Bielefeld's professional team was relegated from the 2nd Bundesliga at the same time, the second team was not allowed to be promoted.

In the winter of 2016, Scherning became an assistant coach at SC Paderborn 07 and experienced turbulent times there. Initially relegated in terms of sport, the team only remained third-class in 2017 thanks to the license refusal for TSV 1860 Munich. Two promotions in a row followed under head coach Steffen Baumgart, which brought Paderborn into the Bundesliga in 2019. After a year, the team were relegated.

On 7 June 2021, Scherning returned to management as he was appointed head coach at 3. Liga side VfL Osnabrück, who were freshly relegated from the 2. Bundesliga. After just over a year in charge of Osnabrück, Scherning returned to Arminia Bielefeld; but this time as the head coach of the first team, as he replaced the sacked Ulrich Forte- who departed with the side in the relegation places. In March 2023, he was sacked.

On 7 November 2023, Scherning became new manager of Eintracht Braunschweig. In May 2025, he was sacked.

On 10 November 2025, Scherning was announced as new manager of SV Wehen Wiesbaden. The club sacked him on 14 September 2026 after the team's terrible start into the 2026/2027 season.

== Managerial statistics ==
As of 18 May 2025

Managerial record by team and tenure
Team	From	To	Record								Ref
Team	From	To	G	W	D	L	GF	GA	GD	Win %	Ref
Arminia Bielefeld II	1 July 2012	6 December 2016	151	81	19	51	297	201	+96	53.64	
VfL Osnabrück	7 June 2021	18 August 2022	45	20	12	13	69	56	+13	44.44	
Arminia Bielefeld	18 August 2022	7 March 2023	20	6	3	11	29	35	−6	30.00	
Eintracht Braunschweig	7 November 2023	19 May 2025	57	18	14	25	69	97	−28	31.58	
Total			273	125	48	100	464	389	+75	45.79	—
