= Peer Posipal =

German footballer (born 1962)

Personal information
- Date of birth: 3 July 1962 (age 64)
- Place of birth: Hamburg, West Germany
- Height: 1.78 m (5 ft 10 in)
- Position: Midfielder

Youth career
- Hamburger SV

Senior career*
Years	Team	Apps	(Gls)
–1982	Hamburger SV Amateure		
1982–1989	Eintracht Braunschweig	152	(17)
1989–1991	Preußen Münster	69	(9)
Total		221	(26)
- * Club domestic league appearances and goals

Peer Posipal (born 3 July 1962, in Hamburg) is a German former professional footballer who played as a midfielder. He spent three seasons in the Bundesliga with Eintracht Braunschweig, as well as five seasons in the 2. Bundesliga with Braunschweig and Preußen Münster.

== Personal life ==
Peer Posipal is the son of 1954 FIFA World Cup winner Josef Posipal and the father of Patrick Posipal, also a professional footballer.
