= Josef Posipal =

German footballer (1927–1997)

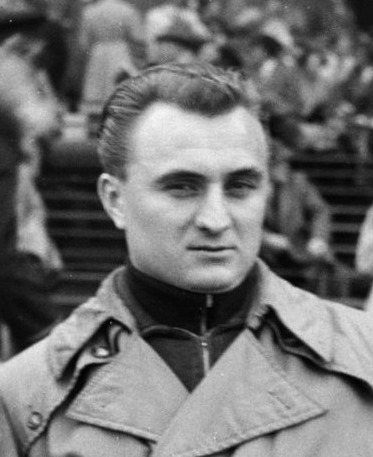
- Posipal in 1953

Personal information
- Date of birth: 20 June 1927
- Place of birth: Lugoj, Romania
- Date of death: 21 February 1997 (aged 69)
- Place of death: Hamburg, Germany
- Height: 1.76 m (5 ft 9 in)
- Position: Defender

Youth career
- 1943–1944: TSV Badenstedt
- 1945–1946: Blau-Weiß Wölpinghausen
- 1946: SV Linden 07

Senior career*
| Years | Team | Apps | (Gls) |
| 1946–1949 | SV Arminia Hannover | | |
| 1949–1958 | Hamburger SV | 250 | (13) |

International career
| 1951–1956 | West Germany | 32 | (1) |
Medal record
Men's football
Representing West Germany
FIFA World Cup
| Winner | 1954 Switzerland |
- * Club domestic league appearances and goals

Josef "Jupp" Posipal (20 June 1927 – 21 February 1997) was a German footballer. Born in Romania, he was part of the Germany national team that won the 1954 FIFA World Cup. During his club career he played for SV Linden 07, SV Arminia Hannover, and Hamburger SV.

== Career ==
Posipal was born in Lugoj, Romania, to a father of German descent and a mother of Hungarian origin. When he was 16, Posipal's family relocated to Germany. In his youth his sportive activities focused on swimming and track-and-field as well as handball. In 1949 he joined Hamburger SV as then coach Georg Knöpfle was looking for a forward. However Knöpfle soon discovered that Posipal was a strong defender and withdrew him from attack to a half back position. Already a year later in 1950, West Germany national team coach Sepp Herberger intended to invite Posipal to join the squad for Germany's first international game after World War II, but officials found out that Posipal had a Romanian citizenship and not German. After he had become a West-German citizen in 1951, Posipal debuted in the international game against Turkey in West Berlin.

In 1952, Posipal was moved from the right half back position to that of center half. In that position he was considered to be one of Germany's best defenders during these years and one of the best in European football. In October 1953, he was invited to represent Europe in a game against England at Wembley Stadium. However, during the first round of the 1954 FIFA World Cup, Posipal had lost his form and after being injured for the quarterfinal against Yugoslavia, 1. FC Kaiserslautern’s Werner Liebrich played as center half instead of Posipal. Being fit again for the semifinal against Austria, Herberger brought Posipal back to the starting team, but since Liebrich had played exceptionally well against Yugoslavia, Posipal played as a right full back at the expense of Fritz Laband. Herberger's trust in Posipal despite his lack of form in previous games paid off as Posipal did very well in the semifinal and the final in the unusual new position. For the rest of his international career, Posipal kept playing as right back with Liebrich as the center half. He finished his football career in 1958.

== Legacy ==
In 2012, when his long-time club Hamburger SV celebrated its 125th anniversary, Posipal was elected into the club history's all-star team.

== Personal life and death ==
Posipal died at the age of 69 in Hamburg of heart failure. He was married to Gisela and had two sons with her. His son Peer Posipal, who played for the Bundesliga team Eintracht Braunschweig, is a former professional football player as well. His grandson Patrick Posipal is also a professional footballer.
