= Fabian Senninger =

German-Nigerian footballer

Personal information
- Full name: Fabian Macaulay Senninger
- Date of birth: 25 January 1996 (age 30)
- Place of birth: Berlin, Germany
- Height: 1.75 m (5 ft 9 in)
- Position: Right-back

Team information
- Current team: Berliner SC
- Number: 4

Youth career
- –2012: SC Staaken
- 2012–2015: Hertha Zehlendorf
- 2015–2016: Nike Academy

Senior career*
Years	Team	Apps	(Gls)
2016–2020	Hannover 96 II	28	(2)
2017–2019	→ SV Meppen (loan)	24	(0)
2020–2021	SV Lippstadt 08	4	(0)
2021–2022	Berliner AK 07	16	(0)
2023–	Berliner SC	7	(3)
- * Club domestic league appearances and goals as of 20:40, 11 June 2023 (UTC)

Fabian Senninger (born 25 January 1996) is a German-Nigerian professional footballer who plays as a right-back for Berliner SC.

== Personal life ==
Senninger is the son of a German mother and Nigerian father. In December 2016 Senninger stated that he was ready to commit to Nigeria internationally over Germany.
