= Fernando Canales (footballer) =

Peruvian footballer (born 1995)

Personal information
- Full name: Fernando Alexis Canales Alvarado
- Date of birth: 13 April 1995 (age 31)
- Place of birth: Camaná, Peru
- Height: 1.71 m (5 ft 7 1/2 in)
- Position: Defender

Team information
- Current team: UTC
- Number: 17

Youth career
- 2012: Nike Academy

Senior career*
Years	Team	Apps	(Gls)
2014	León de Huánuco	23	(1)
2014–2016	Alianza Lima	11	(0)
2017	U. de San Martín	9	(0)
2018–	UTC	12	(1)

International career^{‡}
2013	Peru U18		(1)
2014–2015	Peru U20	8	(0)
Medal record
Alianza Lima
Runner-up	Torneo del Inca	2015
- * Club domestic league appearances and goals as of 21:28, 22 July 2018 (UTC) ‡ National team caps and goals as of 21:28, 22 July 2018 (UTC)

Fernando Alexis Canales Alvarado (born April 13, 1995) is a Peruvian footballer who currently plays for Universidad Técnica de Cajamarca.

== Club career ==
Canales participated in 'The Chance', organised by the Nike Academy where he was one of the sixteen 2012 finalists.

He started his professional career with León de Huánuco, before leaving for Alianza Lima in 2014. He spent six months on the sideline in 2016, after tearing ligaments in his knee.

In December 2016, Canales signed for Universidad de San Martín.

== International career ==
Canales played for the Peru under-18 side that competed at the 2013 Bolivarian Games, finishing third. He scored in the semi-final against the Ecuador under-18s. He was later called up for the Peru under-20 side that featured at the 2015 South American Youth Football Championship, playing in 6 games.

== Career statistics ==
=== Club ===
As of 22 July 2018.

Club	Season	League			Cup		Continental		Other		Total	
Club	Season	Division	Apps	Goals	Apps	Goals	Apps	Goals	Apps	Goals	Apps	Goals
León de Huánuco	2014	Torneo Descentralizado	23	1	10 (Note: Appearances in the Torneo del Inca)	0	–		0	0	33	1
Alianza Lima	2015	Torneo Descentralizado	9	0	5	1	–		0	0	14	1
Alianza Lima	2016	Torneo Descentralizado	2	0	0	0	–		0	0	2	0
Alianza Lima	Total		11	0	5	1	0	0	0	0	16	1
U. de San Martín	2017	Torneo Descentralizado	9	0	0	0	–		0	0	9	0
UTC	2018	Torneo Descentralizado	12	1	0	0	2 (Note: Appearances in the Copa Sudamericana)	0	0	0	33	1
Career total			55	2	15	1	2	0	0	0	72	3
