= Markus Ballmert =

German footballer

Personal information
- Date of birth: 27 November 1993 (age 32)
- Place of birth: Frankfurt, Germany
- Height: 1.73 m (5 ft 8 in)
- Position: Defender

Team information
- Current team: Darmstadt 98 II

Youth career
- –2009: FC Kalbach
- 2009–2012: FSV Frankfurt

Senior career*
Years	Team	Apps	(Gls)
2012–2014	FSV Frankfurt II	62	(4)
2014–2015	FSV Frankfurt	4	(0)
2015–2017	Hannover 96 II	70	(3)
2017–2023	SV Meppen	170	(6)
2024	FC Bayern Alzenau	15	(0)
2024–	Darmstadt 98 II	0	(0)
- * Club domestic league appearances and goals as of 1 June 2024

Markus Ballmert (born 27 November 1993) is a German professional footballer who plays as a defender for Darmstadt 98 II.
