= Marius Kleinsorge =

German footballer

Personal information
- Date of birth: 30 October 1995 (age 30)
- Place of birth: Goslar, Germany
- Height: 1.70 m (5 ft 7 in)
- Position: Forward

Team information
- Current team: Rot-Weiß Oberhausen
- Number: 7

Youth career
- FG 16 Vienenburg/Wiedelah
- –2012: Eintracht Braunschweig
- 2012–2013: Goslarer SC

Senior career*
Years	Team	Apps	(Gls)
2013–2014	Goslarer SC	27	(13)
2014–2016	Wehen Wiesbaden	9	(1)
2014–2015	Wehen Wiesbaden II	18	(2)
2016–2020	SV Meppen	118	(30)
2020–2022	1. FC Kaiserslautern	18	(1)
2021	1. FC Kaiserslautern II	3	(0)
2022	→ Rot-Weiss Essen (loan)	14	(4)
2022–2023	SV Meppen	19	(3)
2023–	Rot-Weiß Oberhausen	11	(1)
- * Club domestic league appearances and goals as of 25 April 2024

Marius Kleinsorge (born 30 October 1995) is a German professional footballer who plays as a forward for the team Rot-Weiß Oberhausen.

== Club career ==
Kleinsorge moved to 1. FC Kaiserslautern from SV Meppen in summer 2020. On 3 January 2022, he joined the Rot-Weiss Essen on loan until the end of the 2021–22 season.

In July 2022, Kleinsorge returned to former club SV Meppen in agreement for a three-year contract.
