= Dennis Geiger (footballer, born 1984) =

German footballer

Personal information
- Full name: Dennis Geiger
- Date of birth: 30 June 1984 (age 42)
- Place of birth: Reutlingen, Germany
- Height: 1.85 m (6 ft 1 in)
- Position: Centre back

Youth career
- SG Reutlingen
- TSV Eningen
- –2002: SSV Reutlingen

Senior career*
Years	Team	Apps	(Gls)
2002–2006	SV 03 Tübingen		
2006–2007	KFC Uerdingen	24	(2)
2007–2008	MSV Duisburg II	32	(0)
2008–2010	KFC Uerdingen	14	(3)
2010–2014	Waldhof Mannheim	118	(14)
2015–2018	SV Meppen	67	(5)
2017–2018	SV Meppen II	2	(0)
2018–2019	SSV Jeddeloh	12	(0)
- * Club domestic league appearances and goals as of 18:07, 21 July 2019 (UTC)

Dennis Geiger (born 30 June 1984) is a German footballer who plays as a defender, most recently for SSV Jeddeloh.
