= Janik Jesgarzewski =

German footballer

Personal information
- Date of birth: 26 January 1994 (age 32)
- Place of birth: Lingen, Germany
- Height: 1.80 m (5 ft 11 in)
- Position: Right-back

Team information
- Current team: SC Spelle-Venhaus
- Number: 3

Youth career
- SV DJK Geeste
- 2004–2012: Twente

Senior career*
Years	Team	Apps	(Gls)
2012–2014	Jong Twente	8	(0)
2014–2022	SV Meppen	187	(2)
2022–2023	FC Teutonia Ottensen	20	(1)
2023–	SC Spelle-Venhaus	31	(0)
- * Club domestic league appearances and goals as of 03:00, 4 July 2024 (UTC)

Janik Jesgarzewski (born 26 January 1994) is a German professional footballer who plays as a right-back for SC Spelle-Venhaus.

== Career ==
Jesgarzewski started playing youth football for SV DJK Geeste, before joining the youth academy of Dutch club Twente in 2004. At Twente he also made his first senior appearances in the second team, Jong FC Twente, on 9 September 2013 as a substitute for Tim Hölscher. In July 2014, he moved to SV Meppen in the Regionalliga Nord. There, he achieved promotion to the 3. Liga at the end of the 2016–17 season. On 22 July 2017, Jesgarzewski made his first professional appearance in the home game against the Würzburger Kickers.
