= Nils Drube =

German football manager

Personal information
- Date of birth: 26 February 1978 (age 48)
- Place of birth: Münster, Germany

Senior career*
Years	Team	Apps	(Gls)
- Westfalia Kinderhaus

Managerial career
- 2008–2011: Preußen Münster (U17)
- 2011–2012: Preußen Münster (U19)
- 2012: Preußen Münster (assistant)
- 2012–2014: Bayer 04 Leverkusen (U19)
- 2014–2015: Bayer 04 Leverkusen (U19 assistant)
- 2018–2019: Sportfreunde Lotte
- * Club domestic league appearances and goals

Nils Drube (born 26 February 1978) is a German football manager, who last managed Sportfreunde Lotte.

== Career ==
=== Preußen Münster ===
As active player, Drube played for Westfalia Kinderhaus and afterwards worked as a youth coach at the club. Drube joined SC Preußen Münster in 2006 as a youth coach. In 2008, he was appointed as manager for the club's U17 squad. In the summer 2011, he was promoted as U19 manager. In January 2012, Pavel Dochev was appointed as first team manager for Münster, and it was announced, that Drube would be supporting the first team coach alongside his position as U19 manager. Drube enjoyed great success at Münster and led the U19 squad to the seventh place in the table and thus the best finish of the club's history in the junior Bundesliga.

=== Bayer Leverkusen ===
He left Münster at the end of the 2011/12 season, to become U19 manager at Bayer 04 Leverkusen. He was the manager until the end of the 2014/15 season, where he got a new role. Peter Hyballa, who was the assistant manager of Drube on the U19 squad, was promoted to manager instead of Drube and Drube was going to assist him from now on. Drube took also over another task, where he was going to be responsible for helping the youth players taking the step up to the first team. From February 2015, Drube was hired as a scout for the first team.

=== Sportfreunde Lotte ===
Drube left Leverkusen in August 2018 to become the manager of Sportfreunde Lotte on a two-year contract. He was fired in April 2019 due to continued failure.
