= Jeroen Gies =

German-Dutch footballer

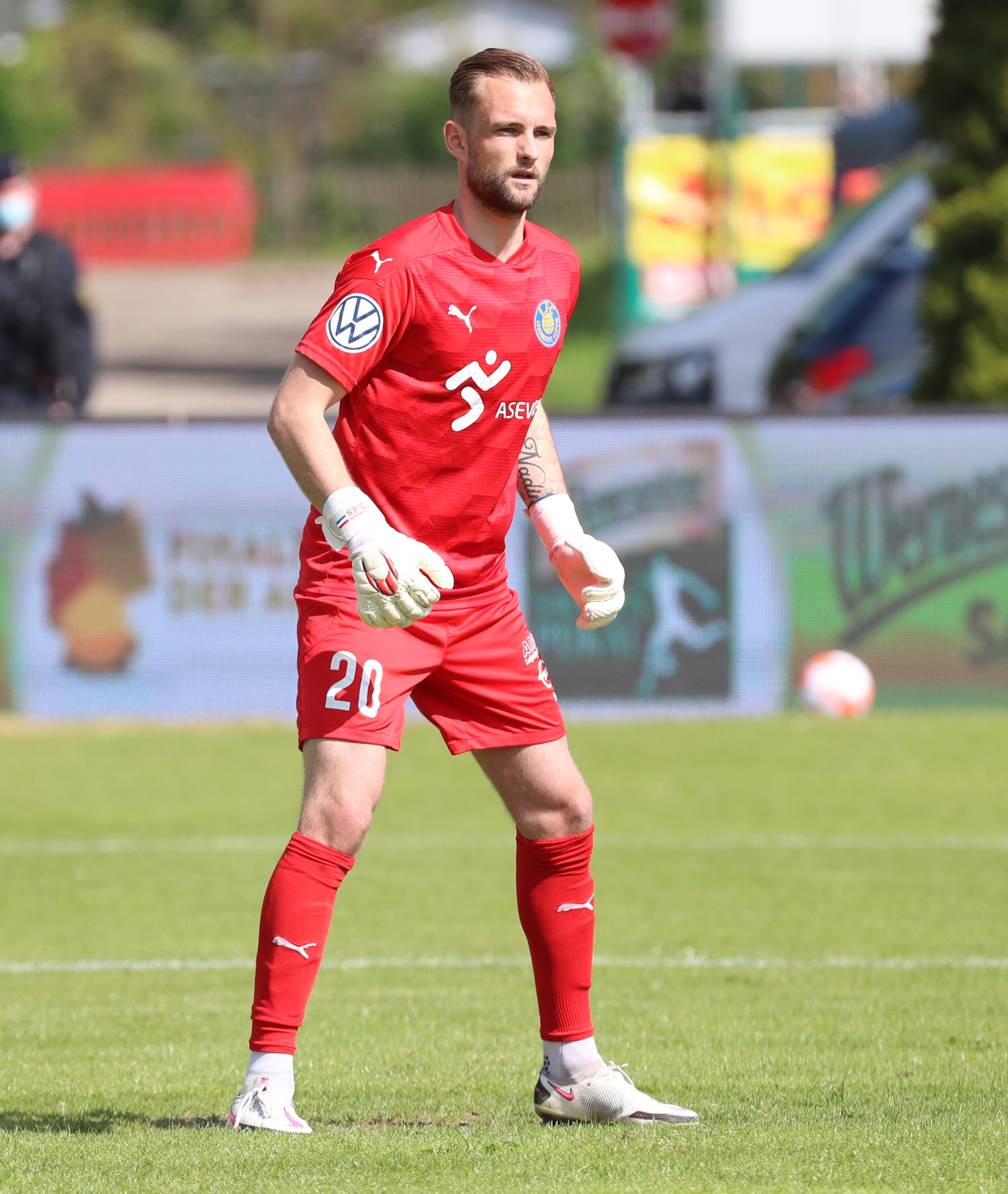
- Gies in 2021

Personal information
- Date of birth: 23 January 1995 (age 31)
- Place of birth: Bothel, Germany
- Height: 1.87 m (6 ft 2 in)
- Position: Goalkeeper

Team information
- Current team: Heeslinger SC
- Number: 1

Youth career
- –2007: TuS Bothel
- 2007–2013: Werder Bremen

Senior career*
Years	Team	Apps	(Gls)
2013–2014	Werder Bremen III		
2014–2016	Jong FC Groningen	0	(0)
2016–2020	SV Meppen	20	(0)
2016–2020	SV Meppen II	19	(0)
2020–2021	1. FC Lokomotive Leipzig	0	(0)
2021–2023	Rotenburger SV	59	(0)
2023–	Heeslinger SC	83	(0)
- * Club domestic league appearances and goals as of 5 August 2026

Jeroen Gies (born 23 January 1995) is a German-Dutch professional footballer who plays as a goalkeeper for Heeslinger SC.
