= Florian Schnorrenberg =

German footballer and manager

Personal information
- Date of birth: 16 April 1977 (age 49)

Managerial career
- Years: Team
- 2013–2018: TuS Erndtebrück
- 2018–2019: Sonnenhof Großaspach
- 2020–2021: Hallescher FC
- 2023–2024: VfB Lübeck

Florian Schnorrenberg (born 16 April 1977) is a German football manager and former player.
