= Menno Heerkes =

Dutch footballer

Personal information
- Date of birth: 22 July 1993 (age 33)
- Place of birth: Hardenberg, Netherlands
- Height: 1.80 m (5 ft 11 in)
- Position: Midfielder

Team information
- Current team: Hoogeveen
- Number: 8

Youth career
- –2004: HHC Hardenberg
- 2004–2009: Emmen
- 2009–2011: Heerenveen

Senior career*
Years	Team	Apps	(Gls)
2011–2012	Emmen	0	(0)
2012–2014	Heerenveen	0	(0)
2014–2016	Heracles Almelo	3	(0)
2016–2018	SV Meppen	28	(0)
2018–2019	HHC Hardenberg	2	(0)
2019–	Hoogeveen	58	(4)
- * Club domestic league appearances and goals as of 11:15, 5 January 2023 (UTC)

Menno Heerkes (born 22 July 1993) is a Dutch footballer who plays as a midfielder for Hoogeveen.

== Career ==
A son of former Heracles Almelo manager Gert Heerkes, Menno left Heracles for German Regionalliga outfit SV Meppen in 2016. Two years later he returned to his hometown club HHC. On 23 January 2019, Heerkes signed with VV Hoogeveen after his contract with HHC Hardenberg was terminated a week before.
