= Patrick Posipal =

German footballer

Personal information
- Date of birth: 3 March 1988 (age 38)
- Place of birth: Braunschweig, West Germany
- Height: 1.89 m (6 ft 2 in)
- Position: Midfielder

Youth career
- –2003: TSV Winsen/Luhe
- 2003–2007: Hamburger SV

Senior career*
Years	Team	Apps	(Gls)
2007–2008	Hamburger SV II	2	(0)
2008–2009	TuS Heeslingen	28	(8)
2009–2010	FC Oberneuland	11	(0)
2010	FC Oberneuland II	6	(0)
2010–2014	TSV Havelse	123	(9)
2014–2015	Lüneburger SK Hansa	17	(0)
2015–2019	SV Meppen	80	(5)
2019–2021	VfB Oldenburg	14	(1)
2022–2023	Lüneburger SK Hansa	22	(3)
- * Club domestic league appearances and goals as of 08:27, 5 September 2023 (UTC)

Patrick Posipal (born 3 March 1988) is a German footballer who most recently played as a midfielder for Lüneburger SK Hansa.

== Career ==
Posipal joined Meppen from Lüneburger SK Hansa in 2015.

== Personal life ==
Patrick Posipal is the son of former Eintracht Braunschweig player Peer Posipal and the grandson of 1954 FIFA World Cup winner Josef Posipal.
