= Martin Wagner (footballer, born 1986) =

German footballer

Personal information
- Full name: Martin Wagner
- Date of birth: 16 September 1986 (age 40)
- Place of birth: Regensburg, West Germany
- Height: 1.68 m (5 ft 6 in)
- Position: Midfielder

Team information
- Current team: Hannover 96 II
- Number: 10

Youth career
- FC Teugn
- –2003: Bayern Munich
- 2003–2005: 1. FC Nürnberg

Senior career*
Years	Team	Apps	(Gls)
2005–2007	Hessen Kassel	13	(0)
2007–2009	Viktoria Aschaffenburg	62	(3)
2009–2010	Eintracht Trier	33	(2)
2010	Sonnenhof Großaspach	12	(0)
2011	Wormatia Worms	12	(1)
2011–2013	Waldhof Mannheim	67	(7)
2013–2019	SV Meppen	195	(28)
2019–	Hannover 96 II	0	(0)
- * Club domestic league appearances and goals as of 10:02, 15 June 2018 (UTC)

Martin Wagner (born 16 September 1986) is a German footballer who plays as a midfielder for Hannover 96 II.

== Career ==
On 11 February 2019 Hannover 96 confirmed, that Wagner would join their reserve team, Hannover 96 II, from the upcoming 2019/20 season.
