= Hänsch-Arena =

German football stadium

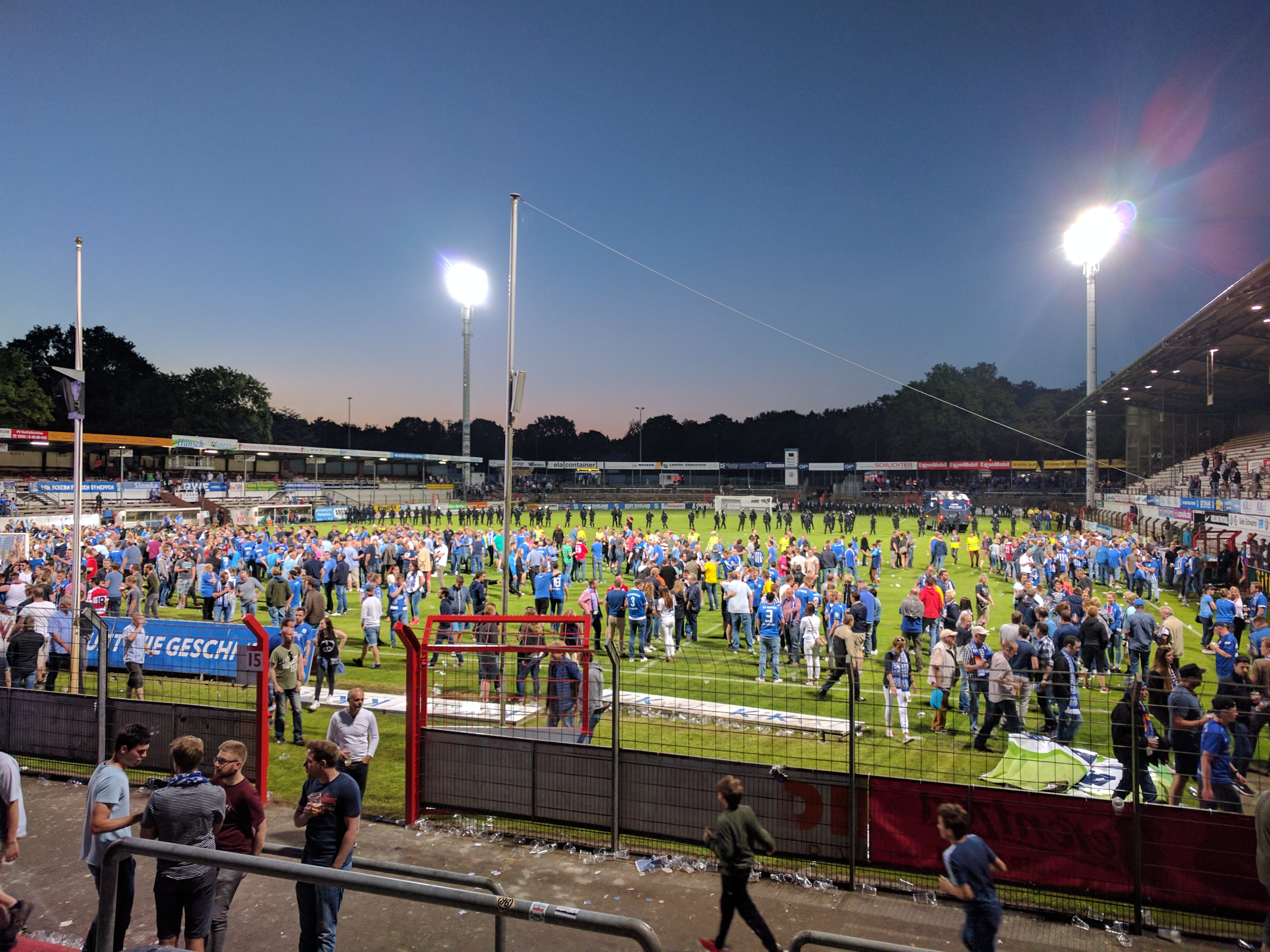
- The Hänsch-Arena in May 2017 after SV Meppen's promotion
- Interactive map of Hänsch-Arena
- Former names: Meppener Sportplatz (1924–1927); Hindenburgstadion (1927–1992); Emslandstadion (1992–2005); Vivaris Arena Emsland (2005–2011); MEP-Arena (2011–2013)
- Location: Meppen, Germany
- Coordinates: 52°42′29″N 7°17′53″E
- Owner: City of Meppen
- Capacity: 13,241

Construction
- Built: 1923
- Opened: 1924
- Renovated: 2017, 2018
- Expanded: 1962, 1969, 1985, 1993, 1996, 2017

Tenant
- SV Meppen

Hänsch-Arena is a stadium in Meppen, Emsland, Lower Saxony, Germany. It is used as the home stadium of SV Meppen and has a capacity of 13,241.

== See also ==
- List of football stadiums in Germany
- Lists of stadiums
