= 1938 World Men's Handball Championship squads =

This article displays the squads for the 1938 World Men's Handball Championship. Each team consisted of 10 to 15 players.

Appearances, goals and ages as of tournament start, 5 February 1938.

== Teams ==
=== Austria ===
Head coach: (N/A) Wilhelm Tolar, Tour guide: (N/A) Hans Zelinka

Players

No.	Pos.	Name	Date of birth (age)	Height	App.	Goals	Club
	GK	Alois Schnabel	27 February 1910 (aged 27)		0	0
	GK	Zdenko Kucera			0	0
	DP	Robert Leu			0	0
	DP	Leopold Wohlrab	22 March 1913 (aged 24)		0	0
	DP	Rudolf Tauscher			0	0
	S	Hans Houschka	21 October 1914 (aged 23)		0	0
	OP	Anton Perwein	10 November 1911 (aged 26)		0	0
	OP	Otto Cerny			0	0
	OP	Jaroslav Volak	7 July 1915 (aged 22)		0	0
	OP	Alfred Schmalzer	28 October 1912 (aged 25)		0	0
	OP	Ferdinand Mantler			0	0
	OP	Franz Axmann			0	0
	OP	Otto Licha	2 November 1912 (aged 25)		0	0

=== Denmark ===
Head coach: (Denmark) Aksel Pedersen

Players

No.	Pos.	Name	Date of birth (age)	Height	App.	Goals	Club
	GK	Egon Sørensen	16 February 1913 (aged 24)				(Denmark) Ajax København
		Walter Madsen					(Denmark) Ajax København
		Svend Aage Madsen					(Denmark) Ajax København
		Ove Jørner					(Denmark) HG København
		Leif Nielsen					(Denmark) Ajax København
		Kai Piasecki					(Denmark) Ajax København
		Holger Christensen					(Denmark) Ajax København
		Egon Sander					(Denmark) HG København
		Carl Muschner					(Denmark) Ajax København
		Arne Pedersen					(Denmark) Ajax København

=== Germany ===
Head coach: (Nazi Germany) Otto Kaundinya

Players

No.	Pos.	Name	Date of birth (age)	Height	App.	Goals	Club
	GK	Karl Herbolzheimer	17 February 1915 (aged 22)		0	0	(Nazi Germany) Polizei SV Stuttgart
	GK	Herbert Schmidt			0	0	(Nazi Germany) TV Forst 1861
	O	Gerd Brüntgens (Played no game)			0	0	(Nazi Germany) Polizei SV Berlin
	D	Walter Hömke			0	0	(Nazi Germany) Vereinigter Akademischer und Askanischer TV 1860 Berlin
	D	Hans Keiter	22 March 1910 (aged 27)		0	0	(Nazi Germany) Polizei SV Berlin
	D	Kurt Lubenow			0	0	(Nazi Germany) WV BEWAG Berlin
	D	Kurt Mahnkopf			0	0	(Nazi Germany) TG Frankfurt-Rödelheim 1874
	O	Hans-Werner Obermark			0	0	(Nazi Germany) Polizei SV Frankfurt
	O	Günter Ortmann	30 November 1916 (aged 21)		0	0	(Nazi Germany) MSV I. R. 49 Borussia Carlowitz Breslau
	D	Gerd Schauer			0	0	(Nazi Germany) SV St. Georg Hamburg
	O	Will Steininger			0	0	(Nazi Germany) WV BEWAG Berlin
	O	Hans Theilig	12 August 1914 (aged 23)		0	0	(Nazi Germany) VfW Oberalster Hamburg
	O	Adolar Woczinski			0	0	(Nazi Germany) WV BEWAG Berlin
	O	Philipp Zimmermann			0	0	(Nazi Germany) SV Waldhof 1907 Mannheim

- GK = Goalkeeper; D = Defender; O = Offender

=== Sweden ===
Head coach: (Sweden) Herbert Johansson

Players

No.	Pos.	Name	Date of birth (age)	Height	App.	Goals	Club
	GK	Åke Kallerdahl			0	0	(Sweden) Karlskrona-Flottan
	GK	Allan Rolander			0	0	(Sweden) Stockholms-Flottan
		Sven Åblad			1	0	(Sweden) Redbergslids IK
		Torsten Almsenius (Anderson)			1	4	(Sweden) Redbergslids IK
		Erik Floberg			0	0	(Sweden) Karlskrona-Flottan
		Åke Forslund			1	2	(Sweden) Majornas IK
		Stig Hjortsberg			0	0	(Sweden) Majornas IK
		Sture Hultberg			0	0	(Sweden) Karlskrona-Flottan
		Yngve Lamberg			1	4	(Sweden) Redbergslids IK
		Roland Nilsson			0	0	(Sweden) Redbergslids IK
		Sigfrid Schönning			1	2	(Sweden) Djurgårdens IF
		Tage Sjöberg			1	2	(Sweden) Redbergslids IK
		Gustav Adolf Thorén			0	0	(Sweden) Majornas IK
