= Cem Efe =

German-Turkish footballer (born 1978)

Personal information
- Date of birth: 9 June 1978 (age 48)
- Place of birth: West Berlin, West Germany
- Height: 1.80 m (5 ft 11 in)
- Position: Forward

Youth career
- 1985–1993: Tennis Borussia Berlin
- 1993–1997: Hertha BSC

Senior career*
Years	Team	Apps	(Gls)
1997–1998	Hertha BSC II		
1998–1999	SV Meppen		
2000	VfL Osnabrück		
2000–2002	SV Babelsberg 03	25	(5)
2003	MKE Ankaragücü		
2004	OFC Neugersdorf		
2004	Berliner AK 07		
2005–2006	SV Yeşilyurt		
2006	Torgelower SV Greif	13	(1)
2007–2008	Türkiyemspor Berlin	20	(3)

Managerial career
- 2008–2009: FC Hertha 03 Zehlendorf (assistant coach)
- 2009–2011: FC Hertha 03 Zehlendorf U19 (head coach)
- 2012–2013: SV Babelsberg 03 (assistant coach)
- 2013: SV Babelsberg 03
- * Club domestic league appearances and goals

Cem Efe (pronounced [ˈdʒem ˈefe]; born 9 June 1978) is a German-Turkish football manager and former player.

== Playing career ==
Efe was born in West Berlin. He scored three goals in 14 games during the 2001–02 season for SV Babelsberg 03 in the 2. Bundesliga.

== Coaching career ==
After his retirement, Efe worked in the 2008–09 season as an assistant coach of the Berlin-Liga team Hertha Zehlendorf. In the 2009–10 season, he was named as head coach of the U-19 team and gained promotion to the Under 19 Bundesliga.
