= Helmut Schneider =

German footballer and manager

Personal information
- Date of birth: 17 July 1913
- Place of birth: Altrip, German Empire
- Date of death: 13 February 1984 (aged 70)
- Place of death: Mannheim, West Germany
- Positions: Defender; midfielder; forward

Youth career
- 1924–193?: TuS Altrip

Senior career*
Years	Team	Apps	(Gls)
193?–1933	TuS Altrip		
1933–1935	Bayern Munich	31	(23)
1935–1946	Waldhof Mannheim	126	(48)
1940–1941	→ SpVgg Fürth (loan)	21	(0)
1943–1944	→ LSV Berlin (loan)		
1944–1945	→ Berliner SV 1892 (loan)	1	(0)
1946–1948	Mainz 05	33	(4)
1948–1950	SpVgg Fürth	26	(1)
Total		238+	(76+)

International career
1940	Germany	1	(0)

Managerial career
- 1946–1948: Mainz 05 (player-manager)
- 1948: VfL Köln 99
- 1948–1951: SpVgg Fürth (player-manager until 1950)
- 1951–1952: VfR Mannheim
- 1952–1953: 1. FC Köln
- 1953–1955: FK Pirmasens
- 1955–1957: Borussia Dortmund
- 1957–1961: FK Pirmasens
- 1961–1963: Bayern Munich
- 1963–1965: 1. FC Saarbrücken
- 1965: Karlsruher SC
- 1966: Wormatia Worms
- 1967–1968: FK Pirmasens
- 1968–1969: Borussia Dortmund
- * Club domestic league appearances and goals

Helmut Schneider (17 July 1913 – 13 February 1984) was a German footballer and manager who played as a defender, midfielder or forward and made one appearance for the Germany national team.

== Club career ==
Schneider played for TuS Altrip, Bayern Munich, Waldhof Mannheim, SpVgg Fürth (two stints), LSV Berlin, Berliner SV 1892 and Mainz 05 during his career. He also played for an unknown club in Ostmark (Austria) during the 1941–42 season. He won the Gauliga Baden in 1935–36 and 1936–37 with Mannheim, where he played as a left winger, inside forward or centre-forward, and was a member of the team which lost to 1. FC Nürnberg in the 1939 Tschammerpokal Final.

== International career ==
Schneider earned his first and only cap for Germany on 1 September 1940 in a friendly against Finland. The home match, which took place in Leipzig, finished as a 13–0 win for Germany.

== Managerial career ==
Schneider began his managerial career in 1946, working as a player-manager at Mainz 05, and from 1948 with SpVgg Fürth. During his studies for earning his managerial license, he also briefly coached at VfL Köln 99 in 1948. He continued to manage Fürth for another season after ending his playing career until 1951. He continued his career with VfR Mannheim, 1. FC Köln, three spells at FK Pirmasens, two spells at Borussia Dortmund, Bayern Munich, 1. FC Saarbrücken, Karlsruher SC and Wormatia Worms. With Dortmund, he helped the club win their first two German titles in 1956 and 1957.

== Personal life ==
Schneider was born on 17 July 1913 in Altrip. He died on 13 February 1984 in Mannheim at the age of 70.

== Career statistics ==
=== International ===
Germany
Year	Apps	Goals
1940	1	0
Total	1	0
