= 1938 World Men's Handball Championship =

Tournament details
- Host country: Germany
- Venue: 1 (in 1 host city)
- Dates: 5–6 February
- Teams: 4

Final positions
- Champions: Germany (1st title)
- Runners-up: Austria
- Third place: Sweden
- Fourth place: Denmark

Tournament statistics
- Matches played: 6
- Goals scored: 53 (8.83 per match)
- Attendance: 56,000 (9,333 per match)
- Top scorer(s): Hans-Werner Obermark; Hans Theilig; Yngve Lamberg (6 goals each)

The 1938 World Men's Handball Championship was the first ever handball World Championship. It was played in Germany on 5 and 6 February 1938. Contested by just 4 national teams, the tournament was won by hosts Germany.

== History ==
Only two years before at the fourth IAHF congress the first international rules for indoor handball were created. The only game between indoor handball national teams had been played between the Danish and Swedish teams in Copenhagen on 8 March 1935. Sweden had won 18 to 12. In Germany and Austria indoor handball was not regularly played and they had no international appearance yet. An unofficial German national team like team played at tournament in Copenhagen on 28 August 1934.

== Venues ==
All games were played in the Deutschlandhalle in Berlin. The court had the dimensions 50 × 25 meter (today 40 × 20 meter) and the games were 2 × 10 minutes (today (2× 30 minutes).

Berlin	1938 World Men's Handball Championship is located in Germany
Deutschlandhalle	1938 World Men's Handball Championship is located in Germany
Capacity: 8,764	1938 World Men's Handball Championship is located in Germany

== Referees ==
One referee from Denmark and two from Germany were refereeing the games.

== Results ==
Pos	Team	Pld	W	D	L	GF	GA	GD	Pts	Germany		Sweden	Denmark
1st place, gold medalist(s)	Germany (H, C)	3	3	0	0	23	9	+14	6	—	5–4	7–2	11–3
2nd place, silver medalist(s)	Austria	3	2	0	1	16	11	+5	4	—	—	5–4	7–2
3rd place, bronze medalist(s)	Sweden	3	1	0	2	8	13	−5	2	—	—	—	2–1
4	Denmark	3	0	0	3	6	20	−14	0	—	—	—	—

Source: IHF
(C) Champions; (H) Hosts

5 February 1938; 21:05	Germany	11–3	Denmark	Deutschlandhalle, Berlin; Attendance: 8 000
5 February 1938; 21:05	Theilig 4 Obermark 3 Mahnkopf 2 Ortmann & Schauer 1	(4–3)	S. Madsen, W. Madsen & Nielsen 1	Deutschlandhalle, Berlin; Attendance: 8 000
5 February 1938; 21:05		Report Denmark		Deutschlandhalle, Berlin; Attendance: 8 000

5 February 1938; 21:50	Sweden	4–5	Austria	Deutschlandhalle, Berlin; Attendance: 8 000; Referees: Carl F.H. Sörensen (DNK)
5 February 1938; 21:50	Lamberg 3 Åblad 1	(2–2)	Perwein 2 Cerny, Tauscher & Volak 1	Deutschlandhalle, Berlin; Attendance: 8 000; Referees: Carl F.H. Sörensen (DNK)
5 February 1938; 21:50		Report Sweden		Deutschlandhalle, Berlin; Attendance: 8 000; Referees: Carl F.H. Sörensen (DNK)

6 February 1938; 20:15	Denmark	1–2	Sweden	Deutschlandhalle, Berlin; Attendance: 10 000; Referees: Hans Schwinietsky (GER)
6 February 1938; 20:15	W. Madsen 1	(1–1)	Lamberg 2	Deutschlandhalle, Berlin; Attendance: 10 000; Referees: Hans Schwinietsky (GER)
6 February 1938; 20:15		Report Denmark; Report Sweden		Deutschlandhalle, Berlin; Attendance: 10 000; Referees: Hans Schwinietsky (GER)

6 February 1938; 20:45	Germany	5–4	Austria	Deutschlandhalle, Berlin; Attendance: 10 000
6 February 1938; 20:45	Obermark 2 Ortmann, Mahnkopf & Theilig 1	(4–2)	Houschka, Perwein, Schmalzer & Tauscher 1	Deutschlandhalle, Berlin; Attendance: 10 000

6 February 1938; 22:20	Denmark	2–7	Austria	Deutschlandhalle, Berlin; Attendance: 10 000
6 February 1938; 22:20	Jørner & Piasecki 1	(0–3)	Tauscher 3 Volak 2 Houschka & Perwein 1	Deutschlandhalle, Berlin; Attendance: 10 000
6 February 1938; 22:20		Report Denmark		Deutschlandhalle, Berlin; Attendance: 10 000

6 February 1938; 22:45	Germany	7–2	Sweden	Deutschlandhalle, Berlin; Attendance: 10 000; Referees: Carl F.H. Sörensen (DNK)
6 February 1938; 22:45	Ortmann 2 Hömke, Obermark, Schauer, Theilig & Zimmermann 1	(3–1)	Åblad & Lamberg 1	Deutschlandhalle, Berlin; Attendance: 10 000; Referees: Carl F.H. Sörensen (DNK)
6 February 1938; 22:45		Report Sweden		Deutschlandhalle, Berlin; Attendance: 10 000; Referees: Carl F.H. Sörensen (DNK)

== Top scorers ==
Rank	Name	Nation	Goals
1	Yngve Lamberg	Sweden	6
1	Hans-Werner Obermark	Germany	6
1	Hans Theilig	Germany	6
4	Rudolf Tauscher	Austria	5
5	Günther Ortmann	Germany	4
5	Jaroslav Volak	Austria	4
7	Kurt Mahnkopf	Germany	3
7	Anton Perwein	Austria	3
9	Sven Åblad	Sweden	2
9	Hans Houschka	Austria	2
9	Walter Madsen	Denmark	2
9	Gerd Schauer	Germany	2
13	8 players		1

== Medallist Squads ==
Gold	Silver	Bronze
Germany	Austria	Sweden
Karl Herbolzheimer; Herbert Schmidt; Gerard Brüntgens; Walter Homke; Hans Keiter; Kurt Lubenow; Kurt Mahnkopf; Hans Obermark; Günther Ortmann; Gerd Schauer; Will Steininger; Hans Theilig; Adolar Woczinski; Philipp Zimmermann	Franz Axmann; Otto Cerny; Hans Houschka; Zdenko Kucera; Robert Leu; Otto Licha; Ferdinand Mantler; Anton Perwein; Alfred Schmalzer; Alois Schnabel; Rudolf Tauscher; Jaroslav Volak; Leopold Woh	Sven Åblad; Torsten Andersson; Erik Floberg; Åke Forslund; Stig Hjortsberg; Sture Hultberg; Åke Kallerdahl; Yngve Lamberg; Roland Nilsson; Allan Rollander; Sigfrid Schönning; Tage Sjöberg; Gustaf Adolf Thoren

== City tournament ==
Besides the World Men's Handball Championship there was also a city tournament played. Berlin won the city tournament.

5 February 1938; 20:15	Frankfurt	5–6	Munich	Deutschlandhalle, Berlin; Attendance: 8 000

5 February 1938; 20:40	Berlin	11–7	Königsberg	Deutschlandhalle, Berlin; Attendance: 8 000

5 February 1938; 22:20	Munich	v	Königsberg	Deutschlandhalle, Berlin; Attendance: 8 000

5 February 1938; 22:45	Berlin	v	Munich	Deutschlandhalle, Berlin; Attendance: 8 000

6 February 1938; 21:15	Munich	v	Königsberg	Deutschlandhalle, Berlin; Attendance: 10 000

6 February 1938; 21:55	Berlin	v	Frankfurt	Deutschlandhalle, Berlin; Attendance: 10 000
