= 1939 Tschammerpokal final =

- Match programme cover
- Event: 1939 Tschammerpokal
1. FC Nürnberg	Waldhof Mannheim
2	0
- Date: 28 April 1940
- Venue: Olympiastadion, Berlin
- Referee: Carl Schütz (Düsseldorf)
- Attendance: 60,000

The 1939 Tschammerpokal final decided the winner of the 1939 Tschammerpokal, the 5th season of Germany's knockout football cup competition. It was played on 28 April 1940 at the Olympiastadion in Berlin. 1. FC Nürnberg won the match 2–0 against Waldhof Mannheim, to claim their 2nd cup title.

== Route to the final ==
The Tschammerpokal began the final stage with 64 teams in a single-elimination knockout cup competition. There were a total of five rounds leading up to the final. Teams were drawn against each other, and the winner after 90 minutes would advance. If still tied, 30 minutes of extra time was played. If the score was still level, a replay would take place at the original away team's stadium. If still level after 90 minutes, 30 minutes of extra time was played. If the score was still level, a second replay would take place at the original home team's stadium. If still level after 90 minutes, 30 minutes of extra time was played. If the score was still level, a drawing of lots would decide who would advance to the next round.

Note: In all results below, the score of the finalist is given first (H: home; A: away).

1. FC Nürnberg		Round	Waldhof Mannheim
Opponent	Result	1939 Tschammerpokal	Opponent	Result
FC Singen 04 (A)	3–1	Round 1	Admira Wien (A)	1–0
Stuttgarter Kickers (H)	2–1	Round 2	Eintracht Frankfurt (A)	1–0 (a.e.t.)
BC Hartha (A)	1–0	Round of 16	VfL Osnabrück (H)	4–0
Fortuna Düsseldorf (H)	3–1	Quarter-finals	Hamburger SV (H)	6–2
Rapid Wien (A)	1–0	Semi-finals	Wacker Wien (H) (A) (H)	1–1 (a.e.t.); 2–2 (replay, a.e.t.); 0–0 (replay, a.e.t.); ✓ – ✗ (drawing of lots)

== Match ==
=== Details ===
28 April 1940

1. FC Nürnberg	2–0	Waldhof Mannheim
Eiberger 46', 85'	Report

Olympiastadion, Berlin
Attendance: 60,000
Referee: Carl Schütz (Düsseldorf)

1. FC Nürnberg	Waldhof Mannheim

GK	1	(Germany) Georg Köhl
RB		(Germany) Willi Billmann (c)
LB		(Germany) Hans Übelein
RH		(Germany) Georg Luber
CH		(Germany) Wilhelm Sold
LH		(Germany) Heinz Carolin
OR		(Germany) Karl Gußner
IR		(Germany) Max Eiberger
CF		(Germany) Julius Übelein
IL		(Germany) Alfred Pfänder
OL		(Germany) Willi Kund
Manager:
(Germany) Alwin Riemke

GK	1	(Germany) Hubert Fischer
RB		(Germany) Helmut Schneider
LB		(Germany) Georg Siegel
RH		(Germany) Hans Mayer
CH		(Germany) Ernst Heermann (c)
LH		(Germany) Karl Ramge
OR		(Germany) Hans Eberhard
IR		(Germany) Reinhold Fanz
CF		(Germany) Josef Erb
IL		(Germany) Willi Pennig
OL		(Germany) Ludwig Günderoth
Manager:
(Germany) Otto Neumann

Match rules

- 90 minutes.
- 30 minutes of extra time if necessary.
- Replay if scores still level.
- No substitutions.
