= Lukas Lämmel =

German footballer (born 1997)

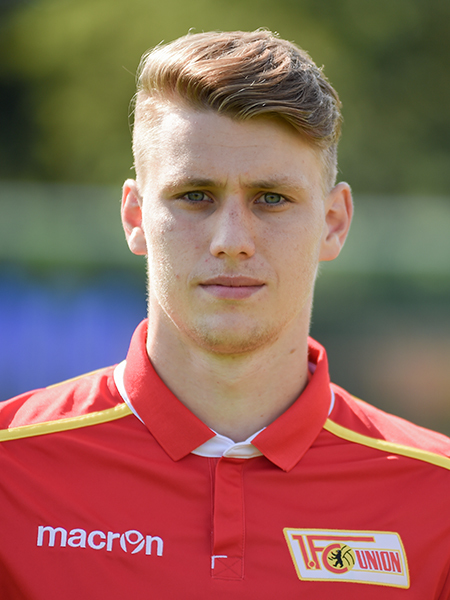
- Lämmel in 2016

Personal information
- Date of birth: 8 September 1997 (age 29)
- Place of birth: Berlin, Germany
- Height: 1.79 m (5 ft 10 in)
- Position: Central midfielder

Team information
- Current team: SV Babelsberg
- Number: 8

Youth career
- 2007–2016: Union Berlin

Senior career*
Years	Team	Apps	(Gls)
2016–2017	Union Berlin	1	(0)
2017–2019	VfR Aalen	36	(0)
2019–2020	SSV Ulm	0	(0)
2020–2022	Berliner AK	47	(5)
2022–2024	Carl Zeiss Jena	65	(13)
2024–2026	Greifswalder FC	40	(1)
2026–	SV Babelsberg	9	(1)
- * Club domestic league appearances and goals as of 23 September 2026

Lukas Lämmel (born 8 September 1997) is a German professional footballer who plays as a central midfielder for Regionalliga Nordost club SV Babelsberg.

== Career ==
Starting in 2007 Lämmel passed through all youth teams of 1. FC Union Berlin. Lämmel made his professional debut on the last matchday of the 2016–17 2. Bundesliga season, coming on as a substitute in 1. FC Union Berlin's 2–1 win away to Greuther Fürth.

In July 2017, he was given a professional contract. On 18 August, Union Berlin announced that the club had agreed to terminate Lämmel's contract which was due to expire in 2018, citing small chances of regular playing time.

On 28 October 2017, free agent Lämmel signed with 3. Liga side VfR Aalen following a trial at the club. He played there until 2019, and had a stint with SSV Ulm before joining Regionalliga Nordost club Berliner AK in 2020. He moved to fellow Regionalliga Nordost club Carl Zeiss Jena on 16 June 2022, signing a two-year contract.
