= Laurin von Piechowski =

German footballer

Personal information
- Date of birth: 22 February 1994 (age 32)
- Place of birth: Berlin, Germany
- Height: 1.92 m (6 ft 4 in)
- Position: Centre-back

Team information
- Current team: SV Babelsberg 03
- Number: 28

Youth career
- Lichterfelder FC
- BFC Preussen
- Hertha Zehlendorf
- –2013: SV Babelsberg 03

Senior career*
| Years | Team | Apps | (Gls) |
| 2013–2017 | SV Babelsberg 03 | 96 | (5) |
| 2017–2018 | Chemnitzer FC | 24 | (1) |
| 2018–2020 | SV Rödinghausen | 26 | (0) |
| 2020–2023 | SV Elversberg | 73 | (4) |
| 2023–2024 | FC 08 Homburg | 7 | (0) |
| 2024–2026 | Lokomotive Leipzig | 53 | (1) |
| 2026– | SV Babelsberg 03 | 3 | (0) |
- * Club domestic league appearances and goals as of 23 September 2026

Laurin von Piechowski (born 22 February 1994) is a German professional footballer who plays as a centre-back for SV Babelsberg 03.

== Career ==
=== Chemnitzer FC and SV Rödinghausen ===
Von Piechowski started playing football in his hometown Berlin for Lichterfelder FC, BFC Preussen and Hertha Zehlendorf, before joining the youth academy of SV Babelsberg 03. After making his senior breakthrough at the club, he moved to 3. Liga club Chemnitzer FC on 13 June 2017. He made his professional debut for the club as a starter, on 23 July 2017, the first matchday of the 2017–18 season, in a 1–0 home win against FSV Zwickau. On 2 August, he scored his first goal in a 4–2 home loss to VfR Aalen, a long-distance strike, which was also Chemnitzer FC's 300th goal in the 3. Liga.

He left the club at the end of the season and signed with Regionalliga West club SV Rödinghausen on 1 September 2018 as a free agent. The team won the Regionalliga West in the 2019–20 season, but did not apply for a 3. Liga license.

=== SV Elversberg ===
On 7 August 2020, Von Piechowski signed a one-year contract with SV Elversberg with an option for an extension for the 2021–22 season. He made his competitive debut for the club on 1 September, coming on as a late substitute for Luca Dürholtz in a 1–0 victory against FC Gießen. He would score his first goal for the club on 27 October 2021, opening the score in a 1–1 away draw against TSV Steinbach Haiger. In his second season at the club, he won promotion to the 3. Liga by winning the Regionalliga Südwest.

== Honours ==
SV Rödinghausen

- Regionalliga West: 2019–20

SV Elversberg

- Regionalliga Südwest: 2021–22
