= Roland Mall =

German footballer (1951–2025)

- Mall in the 1971–72 season

Personal information
- Date of birth: 17 April 1951
- Place of birth: Stuttgart, Württemberg-Baden, West Germany
- Date of death: 7 April 2025 (aged 73)
- Place of death: Stuttgart, Baden-Württemberg, Germany
- Position: Midfielder

Youth career
- 1970–1971: VfB Stuttgart

Senior career*
Years	Team	Apps	(Gls)
1971–1976	VfB Stuttgart	65	(0)
1974–1975	→ VfR Heilbronn (loan)	21	(8)
1976–1979	Preußen Münster	96	(7)
1979–1981	Viktoria Köln	62	(8)
- * Club domestic league appearances and goals

Roland Mall (17 April 1951 – 7 April 2025) was a German footballer. A midfielder, he was known for his career in the Bundesliga in 58 games for VfB Stuttgart from 1971 to 1976. He would also play in the 2. Bundesliga, scoring 21 goals in 186 games.

== Career ==
=== VfB Stuttgart (1970–1976) ===
Mall began his career by playing for the youth sector of VfB Stuttgart. After winning the 1970–71 1. Amateurliga Nordwürttemberg, he and his teammates reached the final of the German amateur football championship under coach Karl Bögelein. Defending champions SC Jülich 1910 under coach Martin Luppen would successfully defend their title at 1–0. For the 1971–72 season, the former youth amateurs Karl Berger, Wolfgang Frank, Gerd Komorowski and Mall were promoted to the senior squad. Mall made his Bundesliga debut on 6 May 1972 in a 1–1 home draw against 1. FC Köln. He was substituted on for Hans Ettmayer in the 79th minute by his previous amateur coach Bögelein as he had replaced Branko Zebec on 19 April 1972. Under new coach Hermann Eppenhoff, he increased his appearance tally to 51 Bundesliga matches in the succeeding 1972–73, 1973–74 Bundesliga seasons. He would especially perform well in the 1973–74 season for performance in the 1973–74 UEFA Cup. Mall and his teammates played against Olympiakos Nicosia, Tatran Presov, Dynamo Kyiv, and Vitória Setúbal, and reached the semi-finals against Feyenoord Rotterdam in April 1974. The 3–0 home win on December 12, 1973, against Kyiv, featuring key players Oleh Blokhin and Yevgeny Rudakov, was a major surprise after a 2-0 first-leg defeat. Mall also played in the 1–2 first leg defeat in Rotterdam, where he faced top players such as Wim Rijsbergen, Wim Jansen, Theo de Jong and Willem van Hanegem in coach Wiel Coerver's team . With a 2–2 draw in Stuttgart, Feyenoord advanced to the final and defeated Tottenham Hotspur in the 1974 UEFA Cup final. When VfB was unexpectedly relegated to the 2. Bundesliga in the 1974–75 Bundesliga, Mall had only played in five league games and made his 2. Bundesliga debut on 7 December 1974 for VfR Heilbronn in a 2–2 home draw against Mainz 05. By the end of the season, he had scored eight goals in 21 league games for Heilbronn under coach Rudolf Faßnacht and alongside teammates such as Karl Hrynda, Reinhold Fanz, Klaus Kubasik and Manfred Grimm. He returned to VfB Stuttgart, which had been relegated to the 2nd Bundesliga, but played only seven games in a disappointing season. Afterward, Mall left Stuttgart and signed a new contract with Preußen Münster for the 1976–77 2. Bundesliga.

=== 2. Bundesliga (1976–1981) ===
Joining the club that was a part of the inaugural Bundesliga season, he met his former Heilbronn coach Faßnacht. The Prussians were desperate to return to the Bundesliga and had invested heavily in Mall, Volker Graul, Alfred Seiler and Klaus Wolf to achieve this goal. During the course of the season, foreign internationals Ranko Petković and Heino Hansen as well as goalkeeper Dietmar Linders joined the Prussian squad. In this era. the league was stigmatized as a "stick league" or "treadmill" which led aggressive enactions to dissuade these claims. These included the financial commitment of patrons and sponsors, who, based on the derived expectations, placed a huge burden on the players' shoulders. The threat of relegation from the 2. Bundesliga also meant that for most clubs, the debts they had incurred along with the relegation could not be paid due to a lack of income from advertising and spectator support. For the players, changes in the club's sporting status meant profound changes in their lives. But there was another reason for the latent aggression on the football field in the 1970s. At that time, captagon had caused a sensation that was known to help overcome normal exhaustion. Dieter Meis, who played for Prussia until 1977, stated on how "Rudi Faßnacht was the instigator. He always had a whole stash of Captagon tablets in the trunk of his car." At the end of the league season, Münster finished sixth, and Faßnacht's career ended in February 1977, before Werner Biskup began preparations for the 1977–78 2. Bundesliga in April. Mall had played 34 of 38 matches with a goal and the Prussians finished sixth.

With 28 points to 10, the Prussians led the table of the 2. Bundesliga North after the first half of the 1977–78 season, three points ahead of Rot-Weiss Essen, and four points each ahead of Uerdingen, SC Fortuna Köln, Arminia Bielefeld, and Tennis Borussia Berlin. Biskup's team opened the second half of the season with a 2–0 home win against Rot-Weiss Essen in front of 30,000 spectators and now led the table by five points. Mall had scored the 2-0 goal in the 86th minute with promotion looking to be a realistic possibility. However, after 38 matchdays, Münster had to settle for third place, having scored three goals in 25 league matches. In his third year at Preußen Münster in the 1978–79 season, he and his team again finished third, having missed only one of 38 league matches that season and again scoring three goals. For the 1979–80 season, he accepted an offer from Viktoria Köln and moved to the Rhineland cathedral city.

Coach Ernst-Günter Habig's team had strengthened its squad alongside Mall with other new signings such as Bernd Helmschrot, Klaus Albert, Rainer Joachimsmeier, Reinhard Schmitz and Frank-Michael Schonert. The team from Höhenberg started the season with 0–4 points, but then got going and finished 8th after the first half of the season with 21–17 points. Mall was a part of the Starting XI alongside the strategists Bernhard Hermes and Jürgen Jendrossek. A 2–2 away draw with local rivals SC Fortuna Köln saw the team finish the season in 4th place on 31 May 1980. Mall had scored four goals in 34 league games. In his second year, Viktoria finished 11th and thus failed to qualify for the single-tier 2. Bundesliga from the 1981–82 season as Mall had scored two goals in 28 league appearances and this being his final season before his retirement.

In later years, he trained as an A-license football coach and worked in the Swabian amateur league, including TSF Ditzingen for the 2014–15 season. He continued to play for VfB Stuttgart's traditional team for years after his return to Stuttgart and was recognized as a club legend. A week before his death on 7 April 2025, he had traveled to Rome with his friend and former teammate Hansi Müller to join other VfB Stuttgart players such as Ailton, Ivan Klasnić, Thomas Helmer and Kevin Kurányi in raising awareness for the children's charity Kinderlachen, playing football in the Vatican City for half an hour.
