= Gordon Büch =

German footballer

Personal information
- Date of birth: 25 October 1995 (age 31)
- Place of birth: Berlin, Germany
- Height: 1.83 m (6 ft 0 in)
- Position: Defender

Team information
- Current team: SV Babelsberg 03
- Number: 27

Youth career
- –2012: Tennis Borussia Berlin
- 2012–2013: Hertha Zehlendorf
- 2013–2014: FC Ingolstadt

Senior career*
Years	Team	Apps	(Gls)
2014–2016	FC Ingolstadt II	50	(0)
2016–2018	TSV Buchbach	57	(1)
2018–2019	Hertha BSC II	23	(1)
2019–2021	FC Ingolstadt II	15	(1)
2019–2021	FC Ingolstadt	5	(0)
2021–2022	Racing FC	26	(1)
2022–2023	VSG Altglienicke	34	(2)
2023–	SV Babelsberg 03	100	(2)
- * Club domestic league appearances and goals as of 23 September 2026

Gordon Büch (born 25 October 1995) is a German footballer who plays for SV Babelsberg 03.
