= Dieter Winter =

German footballer

Personal information
- Date of birth: 17 April 1954

Youth career
- Hertha Zehlendorf

Senior career*
Years	Team	Apps	(Gls)
1974–1981	VfL Wolfsburg		

Managerial career
- 1993: VfL Wolfsburg (caretaker)
- * Club domestic league appearances and goals

Dieter Winter (born 17 April 1954) is a retired German football midfielder.
