= Manfred Krüger =

German footballer

Personal information
- Full name: Manfred Krüger
- Date of birth: 11 August 1952 (age 74)
- Place of birth: Krummhörn, West Germany
- Position: Striker

Senior career*
Years	Team	Apps	(Gls)
1978–1980	Tennis Borussia Berlin	10	(0)
Total		10	(0)
- * Club domestic league appearances and goals

Manfred Krüger (born 11 August 1952 in Krummhörn) is a former professional German footballer.

Krüger made 10 appearances in the 2. Fußball-Bundesliga for Tennis Borussia Berlin during his playing career.
