= Gauliga Berlin-Brandenburg =

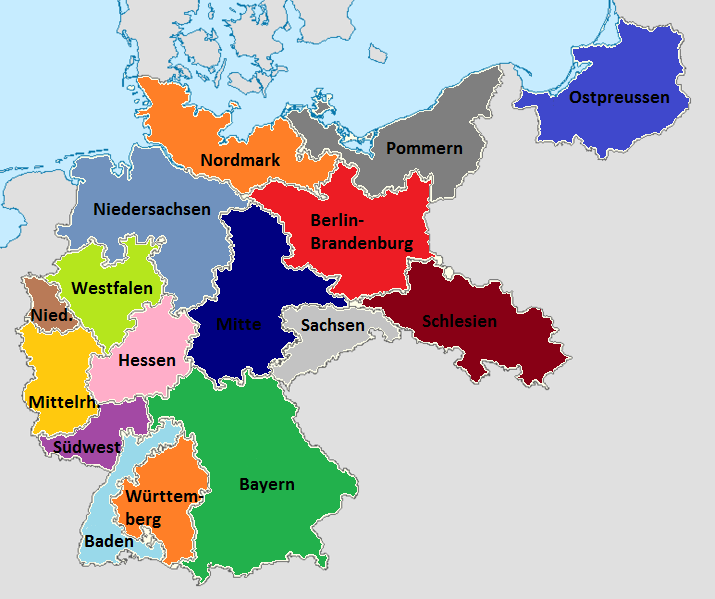
- Organising body: Fachamt Fußball (de)
- Founded: 1933
- Folded: 1945
- Replaced by: Oberliga Berlin; DDR-Oberliga
- Country: Nazi Germany
- Province: Province of Brandenburg; Berlin
- Gau (from 1934): Gau March of Brandenburg; Gau Berlin
- Number of clubs: 12 (1933/34, 1939/40 – 1940/41); 11 (1934/35, 1944/45); 10 (1936/37 – 1938/39, 1941/42 – 1943/44)
- Level on pyramid: Level 1
- Domestic cup: Tschammerpokal
- Last champions: Hertha BSC (1943-44)
- Most championships: Hertha BSC (3); Berliner SV 1892 (3)

The Gauliga Berlin-Brandenburg was the highest football league in the provinces of Brandenburg and Berlin in the German state of Prussia from 1933 to 1945. Shortly after the formation of the league, the Nazis reorganised the administrative regions in Germany, and the Gaue Brandenburg and Berlin replaced the Prussian provinces.

== Overview ==
The league was introduced by the Nazi Sports Office in 1933, after the Nazi take over of power in Germany. It replaced the Oberliga as the highest level of play in German football competitions.

The Gauliga Berlin-Brandenburg was established with twelve clubs, ten from Berlin and two from Brandenburg.

The Gauliga replaced as such the Oberliga Berlin-Brandenburg, the highest league in the region until then.

The clubs from the Berlin/Brandenburg region were not particularly successful in the era from 1933 to 1945. No club reached a German championship or cup final. After Hertha BSC Berlin having played in a record six successive championship finals from 1926 to 1931, this unsuccessful run was a definite decline for the football in Berlin.

In its first season, the league had twelve clubs, playing each other once at home and once away. The league winner qualified for the German championship while the bottom three teams were relegated. The season after, the league was reduced to eleven teams. In 1935–36, it operated with ten clubs and only the bottom two teams being relegated. This modus remained in place until 1939.

In 1939–40, the league played in two separate groups of six teams with a home-and-away final at the end to determine the Berlin-Brandenburg champion.

The 1940–41 season was played as a single division again, now with twelve clubs and the bottom four being relegated. The year after, it returned to the ten-and-two format of the pre-war days. This system remained in place for the 1942–43 and 1943–44 seasons. For its last season, 1944–45, it expanded to eleven clubs.

The imminent collapse of Nazi Germany in 1945 gravely affected all Gauligas and football in the Berlin-Brandenburg region ceased in early 1945 with most clubs having played 13 of their 20-season games and the Berliner SV 92 leading the field.

== Aftermath ==
With the end of the Nazi era, the Gauligas ceased to exist. Berlin came under joint allied control, while Brandenburg was part of the Soviet occupation zone. In Berlin, the Oberliga Berlin was formed as the new highest football league, in 1945. It still included then clubs from the eastern sector of the city, which was under Soviet control.

In Brandenburg, like most of Germany, football took longer to reestablish itself and the regions clubs eventually became part of the new DDR-Oberliga.

== Founding members of the league ==
The twelve founding members and their positions in the 1932-33 Oberliga Berlin-Brandenburg season were:

- BFC Viktoria 89, winner Group A
- Hertha BSC Berlin, winner Group B
- Tennis Borussia Berlin, 2nd Group A
- Blau-Weiß 90 Berlin, 5th Group A
- Berliner SV 92, 5th Group B
- SC Minerva 93 Berlin, 3rd Group B
- Union 06 Oberschöneweide, 6th Group A
- Spandauer SV, 3rd Group A
- VfB Pankow, 2nd Group B
- BV Luckenwalde, 4th Group B
- SC Wacker 04 Tegel, 4th Group A
- SV Cottbus-Süd, club played in the Niederlausitz championship

== Winners and runners-up of the league ==
The winners and runners-up of the league:

| Season | Winner | Runner-Up |
|---|---|---|
| 1933-34 | BFC Viktoria 89 | Hertha BSC Berlin |
| 1934-35 | Hertha BSC Berlin | BFC Viktoria 89 |
| 1935-36 | Berliner SV 92 | SC Minerva 93 Berlin |
| 1936-37 | Hertha BSC Berlin | Berliner SV 92 |
| 1937-38 | Berliner SV 92 | Hertha BSC Berlin |
| 1938-39 | Blau-Weiß 90 Berlin | Hertha BSC Berlin |
| 1939-40 | Union 06 Oberschöneweide | Blau-Weiß 90 Berlin |
| 1940-41 | Tennis Borussia Berlin | Hertha BSC Berlin |
| 1941-42 | Blau-Weiß 90 Berlin | Tennis Borussia Berlin |
| 1942-43 | Berliner SV 92 | SG Lufthansa Berlin |
| 1943-44 | Hertha BSC Berlin | SG Lufthansa Berlin |

== Placings in the league 1933-44 ==
The complete list of all clubs participating in the league:

| Club | 1934 | 1935 | 1936 | 1937 | 1938 | 1939 | 1940 | 1941 | 1942 | 1943 | 1944 |
|---|---|---|---|---|---|---|---|---|---|---|---|
| BFC Viktoria 89 | 1 | 2 | 6 | 7 | 10 | | 6 | | | | |
| Hertha BSC Berlin | 2 | 1 | 3 | 1 | 2 | 2 | 5 | 2 | 3 | 3 | 1 |
| Tennis Borussia Berlin | 3 | 6 | 4 | 5 | 3 | 3 | 5 | 1 | 2 | 5 | 9 |
| Blau-Weiß 90 Berlin | 4 | 4 | 7 | 10 | | 1 | 1 | 3 | 1 | 4 | 5 |
| Berliner SV 92 | 5 | 3 | 1 | 2 | 1 | 6 | 4 | 10 | | 1 | 6 |
| SC Minerva 93 Berlin | 6 | 5 | 2 | 9 | | 4 | 4 | 4 | 7 | 7 | 10 |
| Union 06 Oberschöneweide | 7 | 10 | | 4 | 6 | 5 | 1 | 7 | 10 | | |
| Spandauer SV | 8 | 8 | 10 | | | | 3 | 9 | | | |
| VfB Pankow | 9 | 7 | 9 | | | | | | | | |
| BV Luckenwalde | 10 | | | | | | | | | | |
| SC Wacker 04 Tegel | 11 | | 5 | 3 | 4 | 9 | | 6 | 4 | 8 | 8 |
| SV Cottbus-Süd | 12 | | | | | | | | | | |
| Polizei SV Berlin | | 9 | | | | | 6 | 5 | | 9 | |
| 1. FC Guben | | 11 | | | | | | | | | |
| SpVgg 03 Potsdam ^{2} | | | 8 | 8 | 9 | | | | | | 3 |
| SV Elektra ^{1} | | | | 6 | 5 | 7 | 3 | 11 | | | |
| Friesen Kottbus | | | | | 7 | 10 | | | | | |
| Brandenburger SC 05 | | | | | 8 | 8 | 2 | 8 | 9 | | |
| Lufthansa SG Berlin | | | | | | | 2 | 5 | 8 | 2 | 4 |
| Tasmania 1900 Berlin | | | | | | | | 12 | | 6 | 7 |
| SV Marga | | | | | | | | | 6 | 10 | |
| LSV Berlin | | | | | | | | | | | 2 |

- ^{1} SV Bewag renamed to SV Elektra in 1938.
- ^{2} SV 03 Nowawes renamed to SpVgg Potsdam.
