= Tino Schmidt =

German footballer

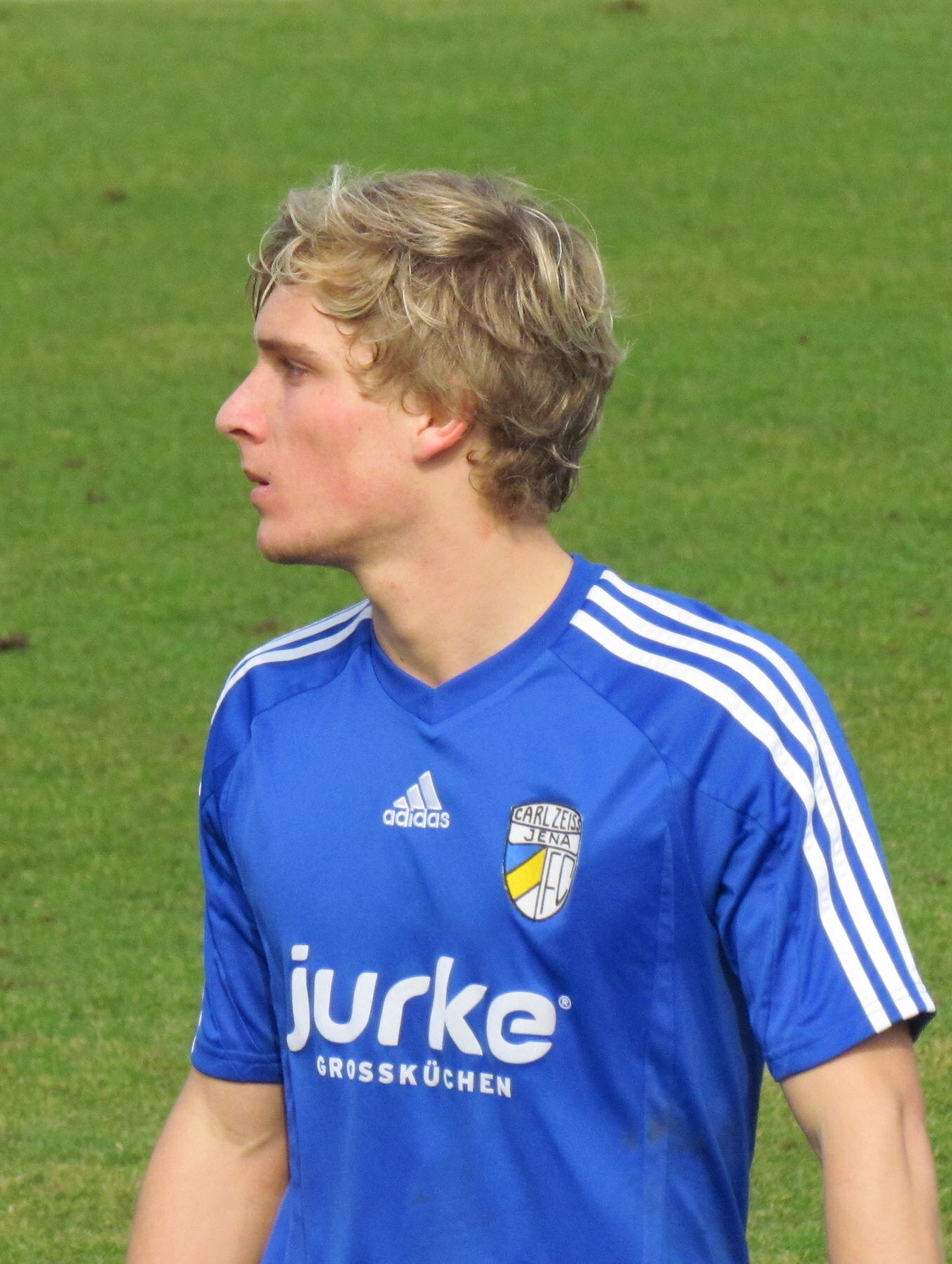

Personal information
- Date of birth: 2 October 1993 (age 33)
- Place of birth: Nordhausen, Germany
- Height: 1.74 m (5 ft 9 in)
- Position: Right midfielder

Team information
- Current team: SV Babelsberg 03
- Number: 11

Youth career
- VfL 28 Ellrich
- NSV Nordhausen
- –2012: Carl Zeiss Jena

Senior career*
Years	Team	Apps	(Gls)
2012–2015	Carl Zeiss Jena	57	(12)
2015–2017	1. FC Kaiserslautern II	62	(11)
2015	→ 1. FC Kaiserslautern	1	(0)
2017–2018	SV Babelsberg 03	33	(11)
2018–2019	Sportfreunde Lotte	9	(0)
2019–2020	BFC Viktoria 1889	22	(2)
2020–2024	SV Babelsberg 03	48	(9)
2024–2025	ZFC Meuselwitz	23	(1)
2025–	SV Babelsberg 03	31	(7)
- * Club domestic league appearances and goals as of 23 September 2026

Tino Schmidt (born 2 October 1993) is a German footballer who plays as a right midfielder for SV Babelsberg 03. He came through Carl Zeiss Jena's youth system and made his debut in January 2012, as a substitute for Jan Simak in a 3. Liga match against 1. FC Saarbrücken.
