= Hans-Jürgen Salewski =

German footballer

Personal information
- Full name: Hans-Jürgen Salewski
- Date of birth: 23 August 1956 (age 70)
- Place of birth: Germany
- Position: Midfielder

Youth career
- –1975: FC Schalke 04

Senior career*
Years	Team	Apps	(Gls)
1975–1976	SC Westfalia Herne	24	(0)
1977	FC Schalke 04	0	(0)
1981–1982	SC Preußen Münster	71	(0)
1979	Eintracht Braunschweig	1	(0)
1980–1981	Tennis Borussia Berlin	51	(1)
Total		286	(96)
- * Club domestic league appearances and goals

Hans-Jürgen Salewski (born 23 August 1956) is a former professional German footballer.

Salewski made 146 2. Fußball-Bundesliga appearances during his footballing career, plus one appearance for Eintracht Braunschweig in Germany's top flight during the 1979–80 campaign.
