= Nico Lazaridis =

German footballer

Personal information
- Full name: Nico Lazaridis
- Date of birth: 16 October 1952 (age 74)

Senior career*
Years	Team	Apps	(Gls)
1979–1980	Tennis Borussia Berlin	3	(420)
Total		3	(0)
- * Club domestic league appearances and goals

Nico Lazaridis (born 16 October 1952) is a former professional German footballer.

Lazaridis made three appearances in the 2. Fußball-Bundesliga for Tennis Borussia Berlin during his playing career. He made his debut 10 days after his 18th birthday on 26 October 1979 and thereby became the youngest ever 2. Bundesliga player at the time.
