= Theo Ogbidi =

German footballer

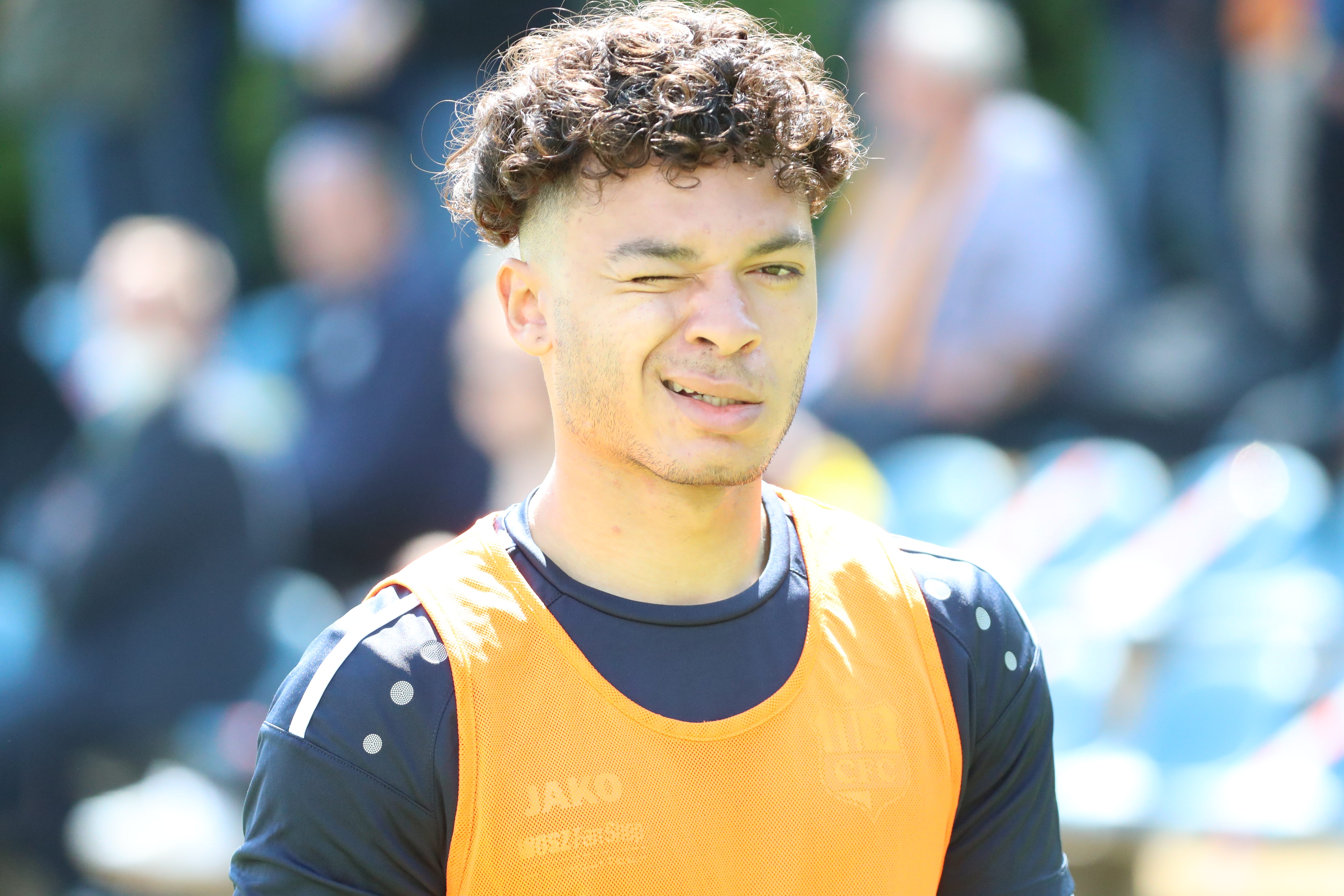

Personal information
- Date of birth: 2 February 2001 (age 25)
- Place of birth: Halle, Germany
- Height: 1.78 m (5 ft 10 in)
- Position: Forward

Team information
- Current team: SV Babelsberg
- Number: 25

Youth career
- –2016: RB Leipzig
- 2016–2020: 1. FC Magdeburg

Senior career*
Years	Team	Apps	(Gls)
2020	1. FC Magdeburg	1	(0)
2020–2021	Chemnitzer FC	12	(0)
2021–2025	1. FC Lokomotive Leipzig	95	(7)
2025–2026	Energie Cottbus	0	(0)
2026–	SV Babelsberg	20	(4)
- * Club domestic league appearances and goals as of 23 September 2026

Theo Ogbidi (born 2 February 2001) is a German footballer who plays as a forward for Regionalliga Nordost club SV Babelsberg.

== Career ==
On 11 June 2025, Ogbidi signed with Energie Cottbus in 3. Liga.

== Career statistics ==
=== Club ===
As of 6 June 2020.

Club	Season	League			Cup		Other		Total	
Club	Season	Division	Apps	Goals	Apps	Goals	Apps	Goals	Apps	Goals
1. FC Magdeburg	2019–20	3. Liga	1	0	0	0	0	0	1	0
Career total			1	0	0	0	0	0	1	0
