= Thomas Grunenberg =

German footballer and manager

Personal information
- Full name: Thomas Grunenberg
- Date of birth: 2 November 1955 (age 70)
- Place of birth: West Berlin, West Germany
- Position: Striker

Senior career*
Years	Team	Apps	(Gls)
1979–1981	Tennis Borussia Berlin	54	(12)
Total		54	(12)

Managerial career
- 1993–1994: Türkiyemspor Berlin
- 1994–1996: Hertha Zehlendorf
- 1996–1997: Tennis Borussia Berlin (youth team)
- 2004–2006: SV Falkensee-Finkenkrug
- 2008–2010: Tennis Borussia Berlin (women)
- * Club domestic league appearances and goals

Thomas Grunenberg (born 2 November 1955 in West Berlin) is a German football manager and former player.
