= Ulrich Büscher =

German footballer

Personal information
- Date of birth: 20 October 1958
- Place of birth: Bielefeld, West Germany
- Date of death: 31 December 2020 (aged 62)
- Place of death: Bielefeld, Germany
- Height: 1.84 m (6 ft 1/2 in)
- Position: Defender

Senior career*
Years	Team	Apps	(Gls)
1977–1978	Arminia Bielefeld	29	(0)
1978–1979	VfL Osnabrück	20	(0)
1979–1987	Arminia Bielefeld	153	(5)
- * Club domestic league appearances and goals

Ulrich Büscher (20 October 1958 – 31 December 2020) was a German football player.

== Career ==
In 1977, he played for Arminia Bielefeld, then spent six months with VfL Osnabrück in 1979 before returning to Arminia Bielefeld. He played 91 games and scored two goals in the Bundesliga, played 35 games in the 2. Bundesliga and played 76 games with 3 goals in the 2. Bundesliga North.

== Achievements ==
- 2. Bundesliga: 1977–78, 1979–80
