= SpVgg Potsdam =

German football club

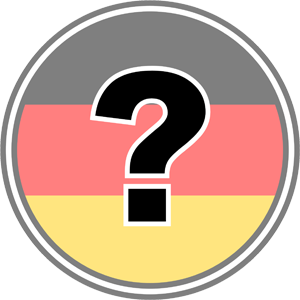
- Full name: Sportvereinigung 03 Potsdam e.V.
- Founded: 1903
- Dissolved: 1945
- Ground: Verlängerte Blücherstaße, Horstweg
Home colours	Away colours

SpVgg Potsdam was a German association football club from the city of Potsdam, Brandenburg. Founded in 1903 as Sportclub Jugendkraft Nowawes the club was active until the end of World War II when it was disbanded by occupying Allied authorities. A successor side emerged in Soviet-occupied East Germany after the war.

== History ==
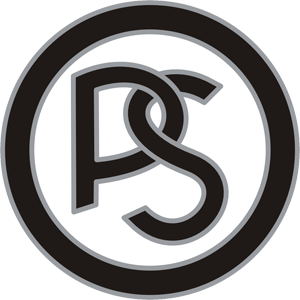
Logo of Potsdamer Sportfreunde ca. 1938.

The original club was established in Nowawes, a settlement which would become first part of Babelsberg and then of Potsdam. In 1919, following World War I, SC Jungendkraft merged with Fußball-Club Fortuna 1905 Nowawes to form Sportverein 03 Nowawes. German football was re-organized in 1933 under the Third Reich into sixteen top-flight divisions known as Gauligen. Following a second-place finish in a 1935 promotion playoff, SV was promoted to the Gauliga Berlin-Brandenburg, but struggled through three seasons there until being relegated in 1938.

On 1 April 1938, the club became SV 03 Neubabelsberg when their home village adopted a new name. In August 1939 they merged with FC Sportfreunde Potsdam to become Sportvereinigung Potsdam. The team finished poorly in a promotion playoff in 1940 and did not re-join top flight competition until 1943, earning a third-place finish in 1943–44. Play in the Gauliga Berlin-Brandenburg came to an end part way through the 1944–45 season as Allied forces rolled through Germany.

=== Postwar play in East Germany ===
The disbanded club was re-formed in 1948 as SG Karl Marx Babelsberg by its one-time membership and on 1 August 1949 they were joined by SG Drewitz which had been established 4 December 1948. On 6 December 1950, they were renamed BSG Motor Babelsberg which went on to become SV Babelsberg 03 in late 1991 in a re-unified Germany.
