= Sigfrid Schönning =

Swedish sportsperson (1913–2002)

- Born: Ruben Sigfrid Schönning; 15 January 1913; Ljusdal, Sweden
- Died: 27 August 2002 (aged 89)
- Handball career
- Sport: Handball
- Position: Right winger

Senior clubs
- Years: Team
- –1937: Stockholms-Flottan
- 1937–: Djurgården
National team
Years	Team	Apps	(Gls)
1935–1941	Sweden	5	(9)
Medal record
World Men's Handball Championship
Bronze medal – third place	1938 Germany	Team competition
Association football career
Senior career*
Years	Team	Apps	(Gls)
1935–1937	Djurgården	6	(3)
- * Club domestic league appearances and goals

Ruben Sigfrid Schönning (15 January 1913 – 27 August 2002) was a Swedish handballer and footballer. He won a bronze medal in the 1938 World Men's Handball Championship with Sweden men's national handball team.

== Biography ==
Born in Ljusdal, Sigfrid Schönning moved to Marstrand and worked as a cabin boy in the Swedish Navy. Schönning, a sportsman in several sports, first had contact with handball at Skeppsgårdskåren in Marstrand in the 1920s. Schönning then moved to Stockholm, and on 11 November 1934, he took part in the first match ever of Allsvenskan, an away game for his Stockholms-Flottans IF against Flottans IF Karlskrona in Karlskrona. He won the 1936–37 Allsvenskan with Stockholms-Flottans IF.

Schönning then continued to Djurgården. Djurgården qualified for the 1937–38 Svenska mästerskapet final and Schönning scored three goals in the final loss against Västerås IK.

He made five international appearances for the Sweden men's national handball team. He debuted against Denmark on 8 March 1935. This was the national team's first international match in indoors handball, and ended in a 18–12 win. In total, he scored nine goals for the national team. He was part of Sweden's bronze medal-winning team at the 1938 World Men's Handball Championship. Schönning played in one match of the tournament, the match against winners Germany. As a handball players, he was a right winger.

As a footballer, Schönning made one Allsvenskan appearance for Djurgården and scored 0 goals during the 1936–37 season. He also played five matches and scored three goals the season before that.
