= Under 19 Bundesliga =

- Founded: 1968 (Championship) 2003 (Bundesliga)
- Country: Germany
- Confederation: UEFA
- Divisions: 3
- Number of clubs: 42
- Level on pyramid: 1
- Domestic cup(s): DFB-Pokal der Junioren
- International cup(s): UEFA Youth League
- Current champions: TSG 1899 Hoffenheim (2nd title) (2023–24)
- Most championships: VfB Stuttgart (10 titles)

The Under 19 Bundesliga (German: A-Junioren Bundesliga) is the highest level in German Under 19 football. It was created in 2003 and is divided in three divisions (Nord/Nordost, West und Süd/Südwest) with 14 teams each. The winner of each divisions and the second-placed team from the Süd/Südwest division join the play-offs for the German U19 champions.

The forerunner of the Under 19 Bundesliga was the A-Jugend-Regionalliga. In the summer of 2003 the divisions North and Northeast as well as South and Southwest were merged, the division West was simply renamed. The intent was to make youth football more competitive.

== History ==
The league was formed in 2003, when the five U 19 Regionalligas merged to form the three Bundesligas as follows:

- Under 19 Bundesliga North/Northeast formed from:
  - Under 19 Regionalliga North
  - Under 19 Regionalliga Northeast
- Under 19 Bundesliga South/Southwest formed from:
  - Under 19 Regionalliga South
  - Under 19 Regionalliga Southwest
- Under 19 Bundesliga West formed from:
  - Under 19 Regionalliga West

The Regionalligas itself had only been formed in 1996, to replace an even more regionalised system with separate leagues for every regional football association. Originally, the DFB planned to organise the league in two regional divisions but was eventually forced to operate with three.

In 2007, the German Football Association followed this example reorganised the under 17 Regionalligas in the same fashion, forming the Under 17 Bundesliga.

== Mode ==
The clubs in each of the three divisions play a home-and-away round whereby there is no inter-league play. Every club plays therefore 26 regular season games. The bottom three teams in each division are relegated to the next level below, in turn, the best three teams from the region are promoted.

The winner of each league plus the runners-up of the South/Southwest region play in the finals round for the German Under 19 championship. The semi-finals are played in a home-and-away format. If the two semi-final teams playing each other are level on points and goals after the second game, there will be a penalty shoot-out. No extra time will be played.

The two semi-final winners reach the final, which is held at the location of the winner of the predetermined semi-final A, unless the team's stadium does not comply with DFB requirement, in which case an alternative venue will be determined. In the final, which is one game only, in case of a draw after normal time, a 20-minute extra time will be played. If the game is still a draw, a penalty shoot-out will determine the winner.

== Geography ==
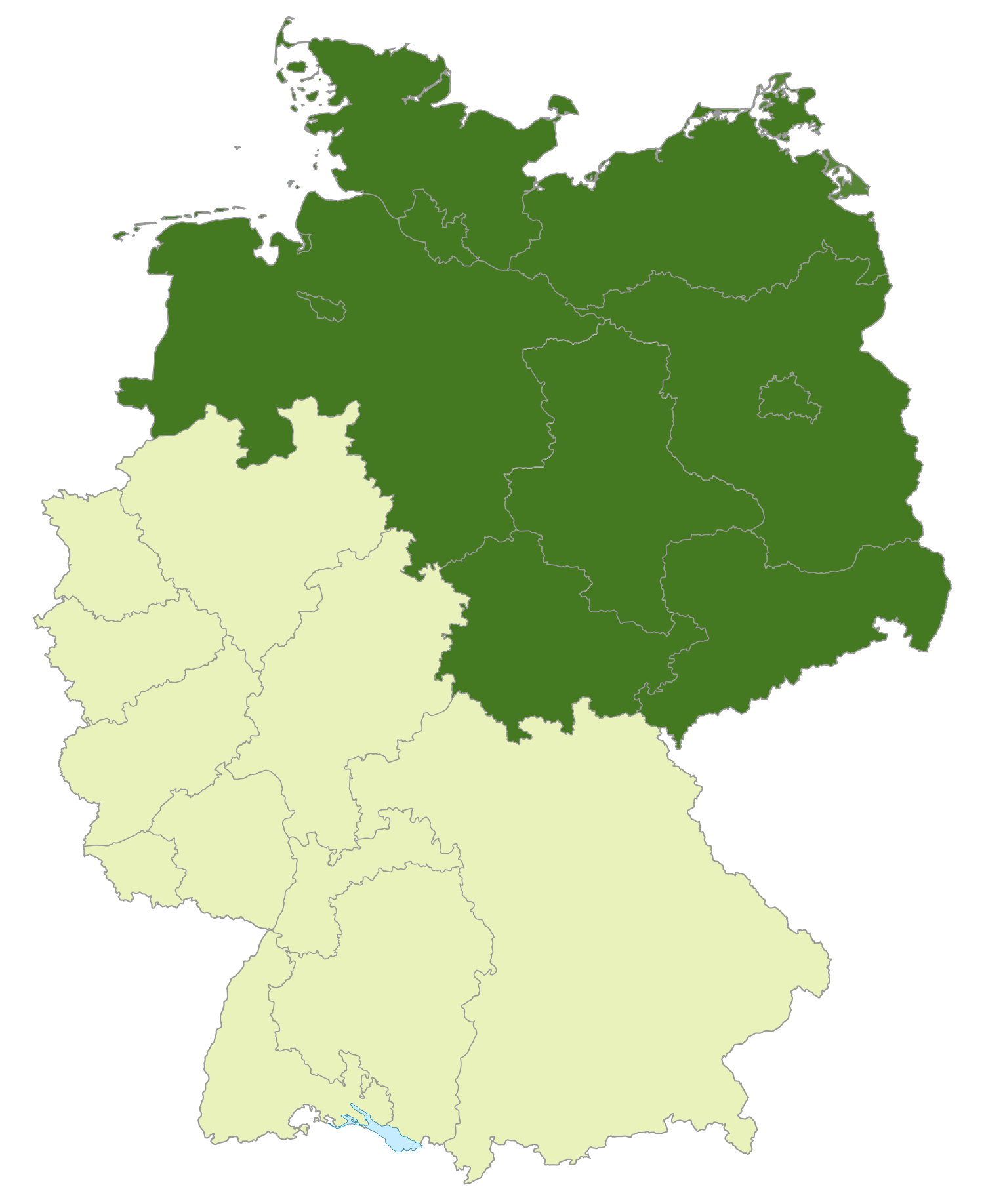
Bundesliga North/Northeast

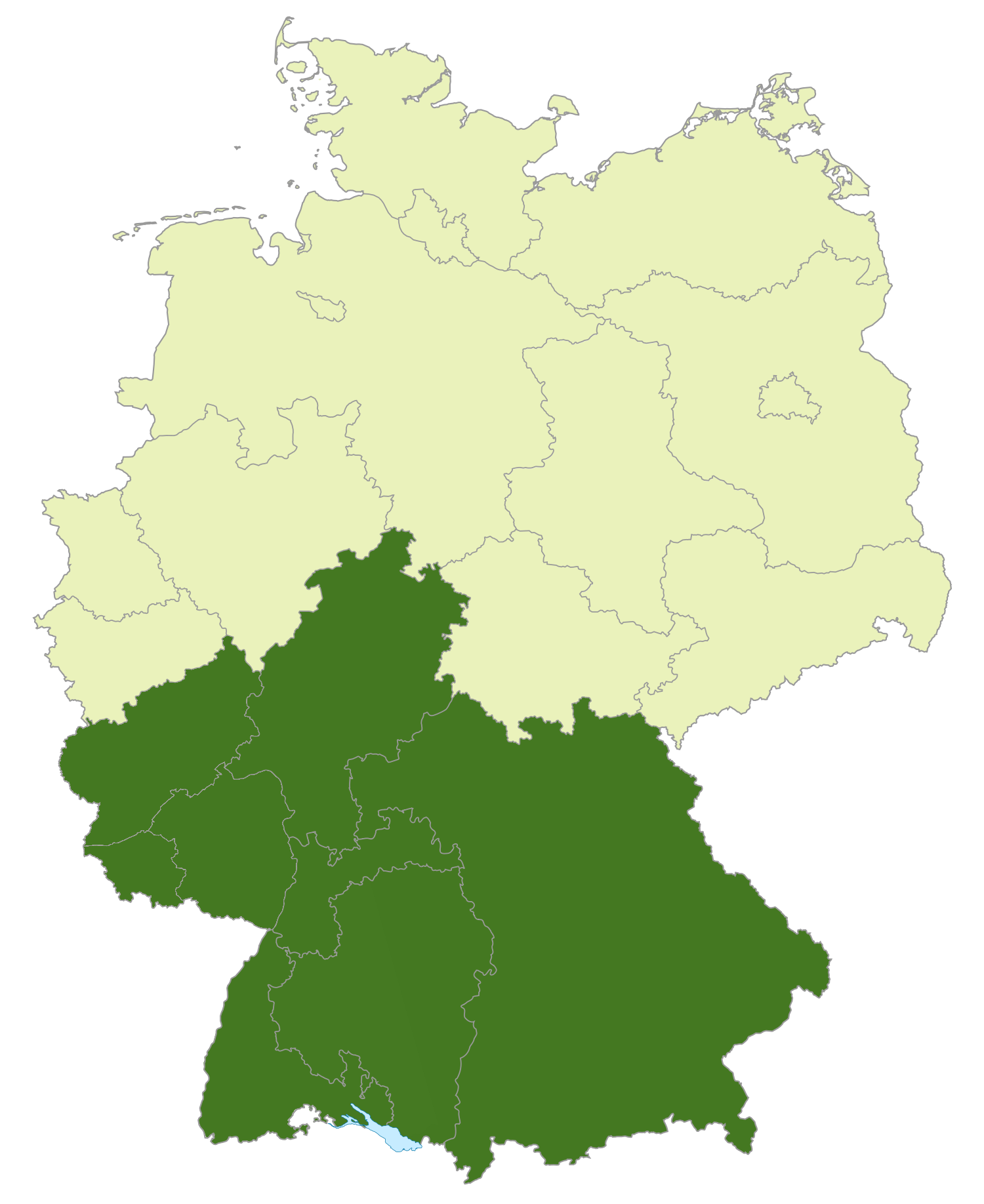
Bundesliga South/Southwest

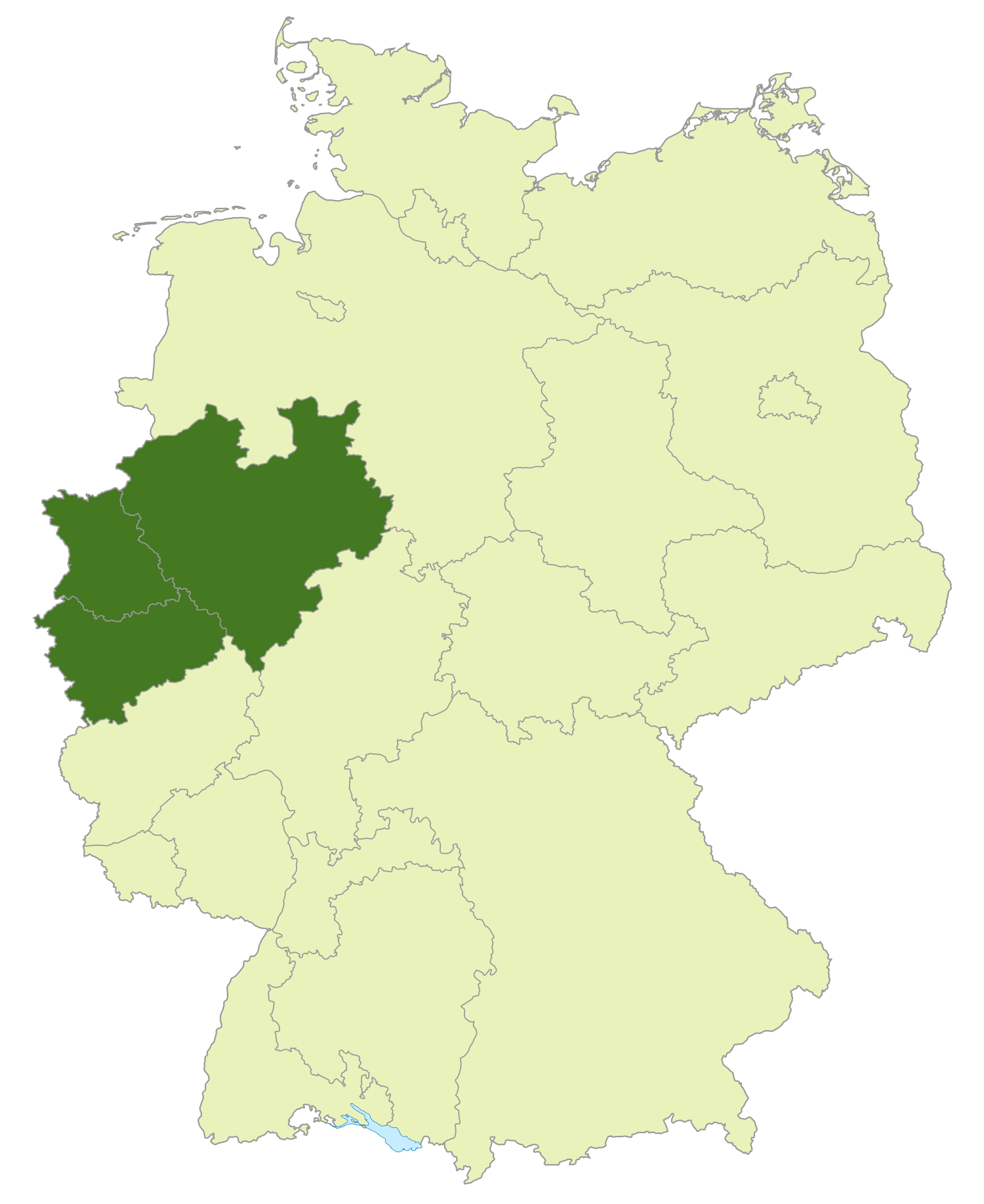
Bundesliga West

The three Bundesligas are not geographically balanced, North/Northeast covers a large area while West a rather small one, but in population termes, the arrangement is much more level. The three leagues cover the following states:

- Under 19 Bundesliga North/Northeast
  - Berlin
  - Brandenburg
  - Bremen
  - Hamburg
  - Lower Saxony
  - Mecklenburg-Vorpommern
  - Saxony
  - Saxony-Anhalt
  - Schleswig-Holstein
  - Thuringia
- Under 19 Bundesliga South/Southwest
  - Baden-Württemberg
  - Bavaria
  - Hesse
  - Rhineland-Palatinate
  - Saarland
- Under 19 Bundesliga West
  - North Rhine-Westphalia

== League pyramid ==
Below the three Bundesligas, a number of second-tier leagues exist which teams are promoted from and relegated to. The league system operates as follows for the 2008–09 season.

=== Under 19 Bundesliga North/Northeast ===
The league has two second divisions as the tier below, these being:

- Regionalliga North
- Regionalliga Northeast

The league champions are directly promoted while the two runners-ups play each other for a third promotion spot

=== Under 19 Bundesliga South/Southwest ===
The league has four second divisions as the tier below, these being:

- Regionalliga Southwest
- Hessenliga
- Oberliga Baden-Württemberg
- Bayernliga

The winners of the Oberliga Baden-Württemberg and Bayernliga are directly promoted. A third promoted team is determined between the winners of the Hessenliga and the Regionalliga Southwest.

=== Under 19 Bundesliga West ===
The league has three second divisions as the tier below, these being:

- Verbandsliga Mittelrhein
- Verbandsliga Niederrhein
- Westfalenliga

The three league champions are directly promoted.

== Current participants (2023–24) ==
Staffel Nord/Nordost: 1. FC Union Berlin; Dynamo Dresden Eintracht Braunschweig FC Carl Zeiss Jena FC St. Pauli Hamburger SV Hannover 96 FC Hansa Rostock Hertha BSC RB Leipzig SV Meppen VfL Osnabrück VfL Wolfsburg Werder Bremen	Staffel Süd/Südwest: 1. FC Heidenheim; 1. FC Kaiserslautern; 1. FC Nürnberg; 1. FSV Mainz 05; Eintracht Frankfurt FC Augsburg FC Bayern Munich FC Ingolstadt 04 Karlsruher SC SpVgg Greuther Fürth SV Sandhausen TSG 1899 Hoffenheim TSV 1860 Munich VfB Stuttgart	Staffel West: 1. FC Köln; Alemannia Aachen Arminia Bielefeld Bayer 04 Leverkusen Borussia Dortmund Borussia Mönchengladbach FC Schalke 04 FC Viktoria Köln Fortuna Düsseldorf MSV Duisburg SC Paderborn 07 SC Verl VfL Bochum Wuppertaler SV

== Levels of youth football ==
German football recognises seven levels of junior football, determined by age and labeled with letters, whereby A is the oldest. In the A level, mixed teams of male and females are not permitted while in B and C mixed teams are allowed if the parents or guardians of the children permit it. Below the C level, mixed teams are generally permitted without restrictions.

Name	Age
A-Junioren	Under 19
B-Junioren	Under 17
C-Junioren	Under 15
D-Junioren	Under 13
E-Junioren	Under 11
F-Junioren	Under 9
G-Junioren^{1}	Under 7

^{1} (commonly known as Bambini)

== Division champions ==
The champions of the three regional divisions:

Season	North/Northeast	South/Southwest	West
2003–04	Hannover 96	FC Bayern Munich	VfL Bochum
2004–05	Hertha BSC	VfB Stuttgart	VfL Bochum
2005–06	Hertha BSC	SC Freiburg	FC Schalke 04
2006–07	Werder Bremen	FC Bayern Munich	Bayer Leverkusen
2007–08	VfL Wolfsburg	VfB Stuttgart	1. FC Köln
2008–09	Werder Bremen	SC Freiburg	Borussia Dortmund
2009–10	FC Hansa Rostock	VfB Stuttgart	Bayer Leverkusen
2010–11	VfL Wolfsburg	1. FC Kaiserslautern	Bayer Leverkusen
2011–12	VfL Wolfsburg	FC Bayern Munich	FC Schalke 04
2012–13	VfL Wolfsburg	FC Bayern Munich	FC Schalke 04
2013–14	VfL Wolfsburg	1899 Hoffenheim	FC Schalke 04
2014–15	RB Leipzig	1899 Hoffenheim	FC Schalke 04
2015–16	Werder Bremen	1899 Hoffenheim	Borussia Dortmund
2016–17	VfL Wolfsburg	FC Bayern Munich	Borussia Dortmund
2017–18	Hertha BSC	1899 Hoffenheim	FC Schalke 04
2018–19	VfL Wolfsburg	VfB Stuttgart	FC Schalke 04

== Championship winners ==
The German under 19 football championship begun in 1969.

=== Pre-Bundesliga era ===
Season	Winner	Finalist	Result
1968–69	**VfL Bochum**	1. FC Saarbrücken	5–3
1969–70	**Hertha Zehlendorf**	TuS Altrip	3–2
1970–71	**1. FC Köln**	1. FC Nürnberg	3–2
1971–72	**MSV Duisburg**	VfB Stuttgart	2–0
1972–73	**VfB Stuttgart**	Kickers Offenbach	3–1
1973–74	**1. FC Nürnberg**	1. FC Köln	1–0
1974–75	**VfB Stuttgart** (2)	FC Schalke 04	4–0
1975–76	**FC Schalke 04**	Rot-Weiss Essen	3–1
1976–77	**MSV Duisburg** (2)	VfB Stuttgart	2–1
1977–78	**MSV Duisburg** (3)	Hertha Zehlendorf	5–2
1978–79	**Stuttgarter Kickers**	1. FC Nürnberg	2–1
1979–80	**Waldhof Mannheim**	FC Schalke 04	2–1
1980–81	**VfB Stuttgart** (3)	FC Schalke 04	4–0
1981–82	**Eintracht Frankfurt**	VfB Stuttgart	2–0
1982–83	**Eintracht Frankfurt** (2)	1. FC Köln	2–0
1983–84	**VfB Stuttgart** (4)	1. FC Kaiserslautern	3–1 aet
1984–85	**Eintracht Frankfurt** (3)	Bayer Leverkusen	4–2
1985–86	**Bayer Leverkusen**	1. FC Nürnberg	2–0
1986–87	**Bayer Uerdingen**	Eintracht Frankfurt	2–1
1987–88	**VfB Stuttgart** (5)	Bayer Leverkusen	4–1
1988–89	**VfB Stuttgart** (6)	1. FC Nürnberg	3–2
1989–90	**VfB Stuttgart** (7)	Hertha Zehlendorf	5–1
1990–91	**VfB Stuttgart** (8)	1. FC Kaiserslautern	4–1
1991–92	**1. FC Kaiserslautern**	1. FC Köln	5–1
1992–93	**FC Augsburg**	1. FC Kaiserslautern	3–1
1993–94	**Borussia Dortmund**	Werder Bremen	3–2
1994–95	**Borussia Dortmund** (2)	Bayer Leverkusen	2–0
1995–96	**Borussia Dortmund** (3)	Waldhof Mannheim	2–0
1996–97	**Borussia Dortmund** (4)	TSV 1860 Munich	2–1
1997–98	**Borussia Dortmund** (5)	FC Bayern Munich	2–2 aet (2–1 pen)
1998–99	**Werder Bremen**	VfB Stuttgart	4–1
1999–2000	**Bayer Leverkusen** (2)	Werder Bremen	4–2
2000–01	**FC Bayern Munich**	Bayer Leverkusen	3–2
2001–02	**FC Bayern Munich** (2)	VfB Stuttgart	4–0
2002–03	**VfB Stuttgart** (9)	Bayer Leverkusen	5–2

=== Bundesliga era ===
Season	Semi-finals	Leg 1	Leg 2	Final	Result
2003–04	**FC Bayern Munich** – Hannover 96	1–0	2–1	**FC Bayern Munich** (3) – VfL Bochum	3–0
2003–04	**VfL Bochum** – SpVgg Greuther Fürth	3–0	4–3	**FC Bayern Munich** (3) – VfL Bochum	3–0
2004–05	**VfB Stuttgart** – SpVgg Greuther Fürth	1–1	3–3 (3–1 pen)	**VfB Stuttgart** (10) – VfL Bochum	1–0
2004–05	**VfL Bochum** – Hertha BSC	2–1	1–2 (3–1 pen)	**VfB Stuttgart** (10) – VfL Bochum	1–0
2005–06	Hertha BSC – **FC Schalke 04**	2–0	0–3	**FC Schalke 04** (2) – FC Bayern Munich	2–1
2005–06	**FC Bayern Munich** – SC Freiburg	2–1	1–0	**FC Schalke 04** (2) – FC Bayern Munich	2–1
2006–07	**Bayer Leverkusen** – 1. FC Kaiserslautern	4–1	2–0	**Bayer Leverkusen** (3) – FC Bayern Munich	2–1 aet
2006–07	Werder Bremen – **FC Bayern Munich**	2–2	2–4	**Bayer Leverkusen** (3) – FC Bayern Munich	2–1 aet
2007–08	VfB Stuttgart – **VfL Wolfsburg**	1–2	2–2	**SC Freiburg** – VfL Wolfsburg	2–0
2007–08	**SC Freiburg** – 1. FC Köln	3–1	2–2	**SC Freiburg** – VfL Wolfsburg	2–0
2008–09	**1. FSV Mainz 05** – Werder Bremen	0–1	3–0	**1. FSV Mainz 05** – Borussia Dortmund	2–1
2008–09	**Borussia Dortmund** – SC Freiburg	3–2	3–1	**1. FSV Mainz 05** – Borussia Dortmund	2–1
2009–10	**FC Hansa Rostock** – 1. FSV Mainz 05	1–0	2–2	**FC Hansa Rostock** – Bayer Leverkusen	1–0
2009–10	VfB Stuttgart – **Bayer Leverkusen**	2–0	0–4	**FC Hansa Rostock** – Bayer Leverkusen	1–0
2010–11	Bayer Leverkusen – **VfL Wolfsburg**	0–2	2–5	**VfL Wolfsburg** – 1. FC Kaiserslautern	4–2
2010–11	**1. FC Kaiserslautern** – TSV 1860 Munich	0–1	2–0	**VfL Wolfsburg** – 1. FC Kaiserslautern	4–2
2011–12	VfL Wolfsburg – **FC Schalke 04**	2–2	2–4	**FC Schalke 04** (3) – FC Bayern Munich	2–1
2011–12	**FC Bayern Munich** – Hertha BSC	3–1	1–1	**FC Schalke 04** (3) – FC Bayern Munich	2–1
2012–13	**VfL Wolfsburg** – FC Schalke 04	2–0	2–0	**VfL Wolfsburg** (2) – FC Hansa Rostock	3–1 aet
2012–13	FC Bayern Munich – **FC Hansa Rostock**	0–2	1–1	**VfL Wolfsburg** (2) – FC Hansa Rostock	3–1 aet
2013–14	**Hannover 96** – VfL Wolfsburg	1–1	2–2 (4–2 pen)	Hannover 96 – **1899 Hoffenheim**	0–5
2013–14	FC Schalke 04 – **1899 Hoffenheim**	0–1	0–0	Hannover 96 – **1899 Hoffenheim**	0–5
2014–15	RB Leipzig – **1899 Hoffenheim**	2–3	2–3	1899 Hoffenheim – **FC Schalke 04** (4)	1–3
2014–15	Karlsruher SC – **FC Schalke 04**	1–2	1–1	1899 Hoffenheim – **FC Schalke 04** (4)	1–3
2015–16	**1899 Hoffenheim** – Werder Bremen	3–1	2–0	1899 Hoffenheim – **Borussia Dortmund** (6)	3–5
2015–16	**Borussia Dortmund** – TSV 1860 Munich	1–2	2–0	1899 Hoffenheim – **Borussia Dortmund** (6)	3–5
2016–17	VfL Wolfsburg – **Borussia Dortmund**	2–3	1–2	**Borussia Dortmund** (7) – FC Bayern Munich	0–0 aet (8–7 pen)
2016–17	**FC Bayern Munich** – FC Schalke 04	1–3	4–2 (5–4 pen)	**Borussia Dortmund** (7) – FC Bayern Munich	0–0 aet (8–7 pen)
2017–18	1899 Hoffenheim – **FC Schalke 04**	0–1	2–4	FC Schalke 04 – **Hertha BSC**	1–3
2017–18	**Hertha BSC** – Borussia Dortmund	4–0	1–3	FC Schalke 04 – **Hertha BSC**	1–3
2018–19	**VfB Stuttgart** – VfL Wolfsburg	0–0	1–1 (3–2 pen)	VfB Stuttgart – **Borussia Dortmund** (8)	3–5
2018–19	FC Schalke 04 – **Borussia Dortmund**	2–2	0–2	VfB Stuttgart – **Borussia Dortmund** (8)	3–5
2021–22	FC Augsburg – **Hertha BSC**	1–3	0–2	Hertha BSC – **Borussia Dortmund** (9)	1–2
2021–22	**Borussia Dortmund** – FC Schalke 04	5–1	0–1	Hertha BSC – **Borussia Dortmund** (9)	1–2
2022–23	**1. FSV Mainz 05** – 1. FC Köln	1–0	0–0	**1. FSV Mainz 05** (2) – Borussia Dortmund	4–2 aet
2022–23	Hertha BSC – **Borussia Dortmund**	0–4	1–0	**1. FSV Mainz 05** (2) – Borussia Dortmund	4–2 aet
2023–24	**Borussia Dortmund** – Hertha BSC	2–2	3–3 (5–4 pen)	Borussia Dortmund – **1899 Hoffenheim** (2)	1–3
2023–24	Borussia Mönchengladbach – **1899 Hoffenheim**	2–6	0–4	Borussia Dortmund – **1899 Hoffenheim** (2)	1–3

- Winner in **bold**.
- (2) denotes the number of titles the club had won at the time, when more than one won.
- Source: Alle A-Junioren-Meister (in German) official DFB website: List of all champions, accessed: 27 November 2008

=== Winners & Finalists ===
As of 2024, this is the standing in the all-time winners list:

Club	Championships	Finals
VfB Stuttgart	10	16
Borussia Dortmund	9	12
FC Schalke 04	4	8
Bayer Leverkusen	3	9
FC Bayern Munich	3	8
Eintracht Frankfurt	3	4
MSV Duisburg	3	3
TSG 1899 Hoffenheim	2	4
VfL Wolfsburg	2	3
1. FSV Mainz 05	2	2
1. FC Kaiserslautern	1	5
1. FC Nürnberg	1	5
1. FC Köln	1	4
Werder Bremen	1	3
Hertha Zehlendorf	1	3
VfL Bochum	1	3
Waldhof Mannheim	1	2
FC Hansa Rostock	1	2
Hertha BSC	1	2
SC Freiburg	1	1
FC Augsburg	1	1
Bayer Uerdingen	1	1
Stuttgarter Kickers	1	1
Hannover 96	0	1
TSV 1860 Munich	0	1
Rot-Weiss Essen	0	1
Kickers Offenbach	0	1
TuS Altrip	0	1
1. FC Saarbrücken	0	1

- On four occasions, the Bundesliga champions also won the German under 19 title:
  - 1984: VfB Stuttgart
  - 1995: Borussia Dortmund
  - 1996: Borussia Dortmund
  - 2001: FC Bayern Munich
- On two occasions, the Bundesliga champions also won the German under 17 and under 19 title:
  - 1996: Borussia Dortmund
  - 2001: FC Bayern Munich
- On four occasions, the under 19 champions also won the under 17 title:
  - 1987: Bayer Uerdingen
  - 1996: Borussia Dortmund
  - 1998: Borussia Dortmund
  - 2001: FC Bayern Munich

== Clubs & league finishes ==
The clubs and their league finishes in the Under 19 Bundesliga since 2003–04. Also shown are the final placing of the qualifying season 2002–03 and the Regionalliga or region, in color, the clubs qualified from:

=== North/Northeast ===
Club	03	04	05	06	07	08	09	10	11	12	13	14	15	16	17	18	19	20
VfL Wolfsburg	1	6	11	5	2	1	7	2	1	1	1	1	4	2	1	5	1	x
Werder Bremen	5	3	2	3	1	2	1	5	2	8	3	4	7	1	11	3	2	x
RB Leipzig													1	4	3	4	3	x
FC St. Pauli	4	9	14				13			10	5	5	6	8	8	6	4	x
Hertha BSC	2	2	1	1	3	5	4	7	4	2	8	3	3	3	2	1	5	x
Hannover 96	2	1	5	4	6	7	5	3	3	4	6	2	2	6	7	8	6	x
Hamburger SV	3	7	9	7	4	9	3	4	8	3	10	10	9	5	4	2	7	x
1. FC Magdeburg	8					14			12								8	x
Dynamo Dresden												7	13		9	7	9	x
1. FC Union Berlin				14			9	10	7	12		12				11	10	x
Niendorfer TSV	8															10	11	x
Holstein Kiel	10		13		12			11	13		9	9	11	10	6	13		x
FC Energie Cottbus	11		4	2	8	4	6	6	10	9	12			7	12			x
Chemnitzer FC	10				9	11	12				13					14		x
TSV Havelse														14			12	
FC Carl Zeiss Jena	4	4	12			6	8	12			7	8	8	9	13		13	
VfL Osnabrück	6	13		12			11	8	6	7	4	13			5	9	14	
Eintracht Braunschweig						10	14						5	11	10	12		
JFV Nordwest															14			
FC Rot-Weiß Erfurt	9		6	11	10	8	10	14		6	11	11	10	12				
FC Viktoria 1889 Berlin														13				
FC Hansa Rostock	1	5	3	6	5	3	2	1	5	5	2	6	12					
SV Meppen													14					
VfB Lübeck	9											14						
Hallescher FC								9	9	11	14							
Hertha Zehlendorf									11	13								
VfL Oldenburg	11									14								
VfB Oldenburg	11								14									
Tennis Borussia Berlin	7	8	7	9	11	13		13										
FC Sachsen Leipzig	13			8	7	12												
Tasmania Gropiusstadt	6	10	8	10	13													
SC Vier- und Marschlande Hamburg					14													
FV Dresden-Nord	5	11	10	13														
VfB Leipzig	3	12																
FC Union 60 Bremen	7	14																
DGF Flensborg	12																	
Blau-Weiß Lohne	13																	
Leher TS Bremerhaven	14																	
Reinickendorfer Füchse	12																	
ESV/Empor Greifswald	14																	

=== South/Southwest ===
Club	03	04	05	06	07	08	09	10	11	12	13	14	15	16	17	18	19	20
VfB Stuttgart	2	4	1	3	4	1	5	1	4	6	2	3	9	3	11	6	1	x
1. FSV Mainz 05	2	8	13		3	5	2	2	6	3	6	5	3	4	3	4	2	x
FC Ingolstadt 04														11	12		3	x
FC Bayern Munich	4	1	6	2	1	3	3	9	7	1	1	6	5	8	1	2	4	x
TSG 1899 Hoffenheim				9	10	9	6	5	9	11	3	1	1	1	4	1	5	x
SC Freiburg	3	5	8	1	5	2	1	4	3	2	5	10	4	7	8	8	6	x
FC Augsburg	10								13		9	8	13		5	3	7	x
Karlsruher SC	12		7	5	9	6	4	3	11	4	10	11	2	9	9	5	8	x
1. FC Heidenheim														13		7	9	x
Eintracht Frankfurt	7	6	9	12		4	9	10	8	5	11	7	8	10	6	11	10	x
1. FC Kaiserslautern	1	7	3	6	2	7	8	8	1	13		4	12		2	9	11	x
SpVgg Greuther Fürth		2	2	10	6	10	10	11	10	7	8	9	6	5	10	14		x
SSV Ulm 1846	6	11	10	7	14				12									x
Kickers Offenbach		13					12											x
1. FC Nürnberg	5	9	5	8	12			6	5	10	13		7	6	7	10	12	
Stuttgarter Kickers		10	11	11	11	12					14				14		13	
FSV Frankfurt											12						14	
SV Wehen Wiesbaden									14							12		
SpVgg Unterhaching			12				13			9	7	12				13		
TSV 1860 Munich	1	3	4	4	7	8	7	7	2	8	4	2	10	2	13			
1. FC Saarbrücken	3	12								14			11	12				
SV Darmstadt 98			14					12						14				
SV Waldhof Mannheim	11							13		12			14					
FC Astoria Walldorf												13						
Wacker Burghausen					8	14						14						
Jahn Regensburg				13		11	11	14										
FC 08 Villingen							14											
Offenburger FV						13												
SSV Reutlingen	9				13													
Eintracht Trier				14														
KSV Baunatal	8	14																
TuS Koblenz	4																	
FSV Salmrohr	5																	
Hassia Bingen	6																	
FK Pirmasens	7																	
DJK/SV Phönix Schifferstadt	8																	
VfB Dillingen	9																	
SG Blaubach-Diedelkopf	10																	
Saar 05 Saarbrücken	11																	
SG Betzdorf	12																	

=== West ===
Club	03	04	05	06	07	08	09	10	11	12	13	14	15	16	17	18	19	20
FC Schalke 04	6	4	2	1	2	2	4	6	2	1	1	1	1	2	2	1	1	x
Borussia Dortmund	3	3	5	5	3	4	1	5	8	5	9	4	5	1	1	2	2	x
1. FC Köln	5	2	4	4	5	1	6	2	4	4	5	2	2	5	6	4	3	x
Bayer 04 Leverkusen	2	5	3	6	1	3	2	1	1	2	3	3	4	7	3	6	4	x
Borussia Mönchengladbach	4	7	6	3	7	8	3	3	3	3	4	6	3	6	5	11	5	x
VfL Bochum	1	1	1	2	11	5	5	4	6	6	2	5	8	3	4	3	6	x
MSV Duisburg			13		6	9	7	8	11	8	11	9	10	9	8	8	7	x
Fortuna Düsseldorf	8	9	14			12		7	5	9	6	7	6	4	9	5	8	x
Rot-Weiß Oberhausen				14						11	10	13			10	7	9	x
SC Preußen Münster	14					13		12		7	12		11	10	11	10	10	x
Alemannia Aachen	9	11	12		8	10	8	13		10	14						11	x
FC Viktoria Köln		12						14					13		14			x
Arminia Bielefeld		10	9	8	4	6	9	9	12		7	11	14		7	12		x
Wuppertaler SV	13						13		10	14		8	9	11	13			x
SC Paderborn 07	10	14		13												9	12	
Rot-Weiss Essen	7	8	10	9	10	7	12				8	12		8	12		13	
SV Rödinghausen																	14	
DJK Arminia Klosterhardt																13		
SC Fortuna Köln											13			12		14		
1. FC Mönchengladbach													7	13				
TSG Sprockhövel														14				
Bonner SC	12		8	7	14				7	12		10	12					
VfL Theesen												14						
Rot Weiss Ahlen			7	10	9	11	10	11	9	13								
SG Wattenscheid 09	11	6	11	11	12		11	10	13									
SpVgg Erkenschwick					13				14									
Bergisch Gladbach 09							14											
VfL Leverkusen				12		14												
KFC Uerdingen 05		13																

=== Key ===
League champions
League runners-up

Region of origin
North
Northeast
South
Southwest
West

== Top scorers ==
The league's top scorers since the 2007–08 season:

=== North/Northeast ===
The top scorers of the North/Northeast division:

Season	Player	Club	Goals
2007–08	(Germany) Deniz Ayçiçek (Germany) Carsten Kammlott	Hannover 96 FC Rot-Weiß Erfurt	17
2008–09	(Germany) Pascal Testroet	Werder Bremen	15
2009–10	(Germany) Mario Petry	VfL Wolfsburg	22
2010–11	(Germany) Gerrit Wegkamp	VfL Osnabrück	20
2011–12	(Germany) Kai Druschky (Germany) Philip Hauck (Germany) Kevin Zschimmer	1. FC Union Berlin; VfL Wolfsburg Hallescher FC	16
2012–13	(Germany) Federico Palacios Martínez	VfL Wolfsburg	16
2013–14	(Germany) Federico Palacios Martínez	VfL Wolfsburg	29
2014–15	(Germany) Nico Empen	FC St. Pauli	26
2015–16	(Germany) Johannes Eggestein	Werder Bremen	33
2016–17	(Germany) Utku Sen	Holstein Kiel	21
2017–18	(Germany) Muhammed Kiprit	Hertha BSC	23
2018–19	(Germany) Jessic Ngankam	Hertha BSC	25

=== South/Southwest ===
The top scorers of the South/Southwest division:

Season	Player	Club	Goals
2007–08	(Germany) Rahman Soyudogru	SC Freiburg	21
2008–09	(Germany) Robin Mertinitz (Germany) Hüseyin Pala	1. FSV Mainz 05; VfB Stuttgart	16
2009–10	(Germany) Markus Ziereis	TSV 1860 München	19
2010–11	(Germany) Julian Wießmeier	1. FC Nürnberg	18
2011–12	(Germany) Bastian Fischer	SpVgg Unterhaching	16
2012–13	(Germany) Timo Werner	VfB Stuttgart	24
2013–14	(Austria) Adrian Grbic	VfB Stuttgart	16
2014–15	(Germany) Joshua Mees	1899 Hoffenheim	20
2015–16	(Germany) Moritz Heinrich (Germany) Meris Skenderović	TSV 1860 München 1899 Hoffenheim	19
2016–17	(Albania) Valdrin Mustafa	1. FC Kaiserslautern	17
2017–18	(Germany) Manuel Wintzheimer	FC Bayern Munich	26
2018–19	(Turkey) Malik Batmaz	Karlsruher SC	18

=== West ===
The top scorers of the West division:

Season	Player	Club	Goals
2007–08	(Germany) Marco Schneider	Borussia Dortmund	20
2008–09	(Germany) Tolgay Arslan	Borussia Dortmund	31
2009–10	(Germany) Pierre-Michel Lasogga	Bayer Leverkusen	25
2010–11	(Germany) Cebio Soukou (Germany) Tobias Steffen	VfL Bochum Bayer Leverkusen	16
2011–12	(Germany) Samed Yeşil	Bayer Leverkusen	19
2012–13	(Germany) Tammo Harder	FC Schalke 04	20
2013–14	(Germany) Lucas Cueto	Bonner SC/1. FC Köln	18
2014–15	(Croatia) Marc Brašnić	Bayer Leverkusen	27
2015–16	(Germany) Cagatay Kader (Germany) Jannik Mause	VfL Bochum: 1. FC Köln	20
2016–17	(Denmark) Jacob Bruun Larsen	Borussia Dortmund	20
2017–18	(Germany) Justin Steinkötter	Borussia Mönchengladbach	20
2018–19	(North Macedonia) Darko Churlinov (Germany) Ömer Uzun	1. FC Köln; VfL Bochum	18
