= Norbert Stolzenburg =

German footballer and manager

Personal information
- Full name: Norbert Stolzenburg
- Date of birth: 12 May 1952 (age 74)
- Place of birth: Berlin, Germany
- Position: Striker

Team information
- Current team: Berliner SV 1892 (manager)

Senior career*
Years	Team	Apps	(Gls)
1970–1973	Hertha Zehlendorf	94	(76)
1973–1976	Tennis Borussia Berlin	104	(73)
1976–1977	Eintracht Braunschweig	10	(2)
1977–1978	MSV Duisburg	21	(5)
1978–1982	Tennis Borussia Berlin	106	(49)
1982–1987	1. Traber FC		
Total		335	(205)
- * Club domestic league appearances and goals

Norbert Stolzenburg (born 12 May 1952) is a German football manager and former player.

Stolzenburg was born in Berlin, and scored a record 122 goals in 210 games for Tennis Borussia Berlin, also becoming the top scorer of the 1975–76 2. Bundesliga Nord season. He played two seasons in the Bundesliga with TeBe. Furthermore, Stolzenburg scored three goals in four games for Eintracht Braunschweig during the 1976–77 UEFA Cup. After his spell in Braunschweig he played for MSV Duisburg in the Bundesliga.

After he retired from playing football, Stolzenburg became a football coach for former club, TeBe. Stolzenburg is currently the manager of Berliner SV 1892.
