= Shinji Yamada =

Japanese footballer (born 1994)

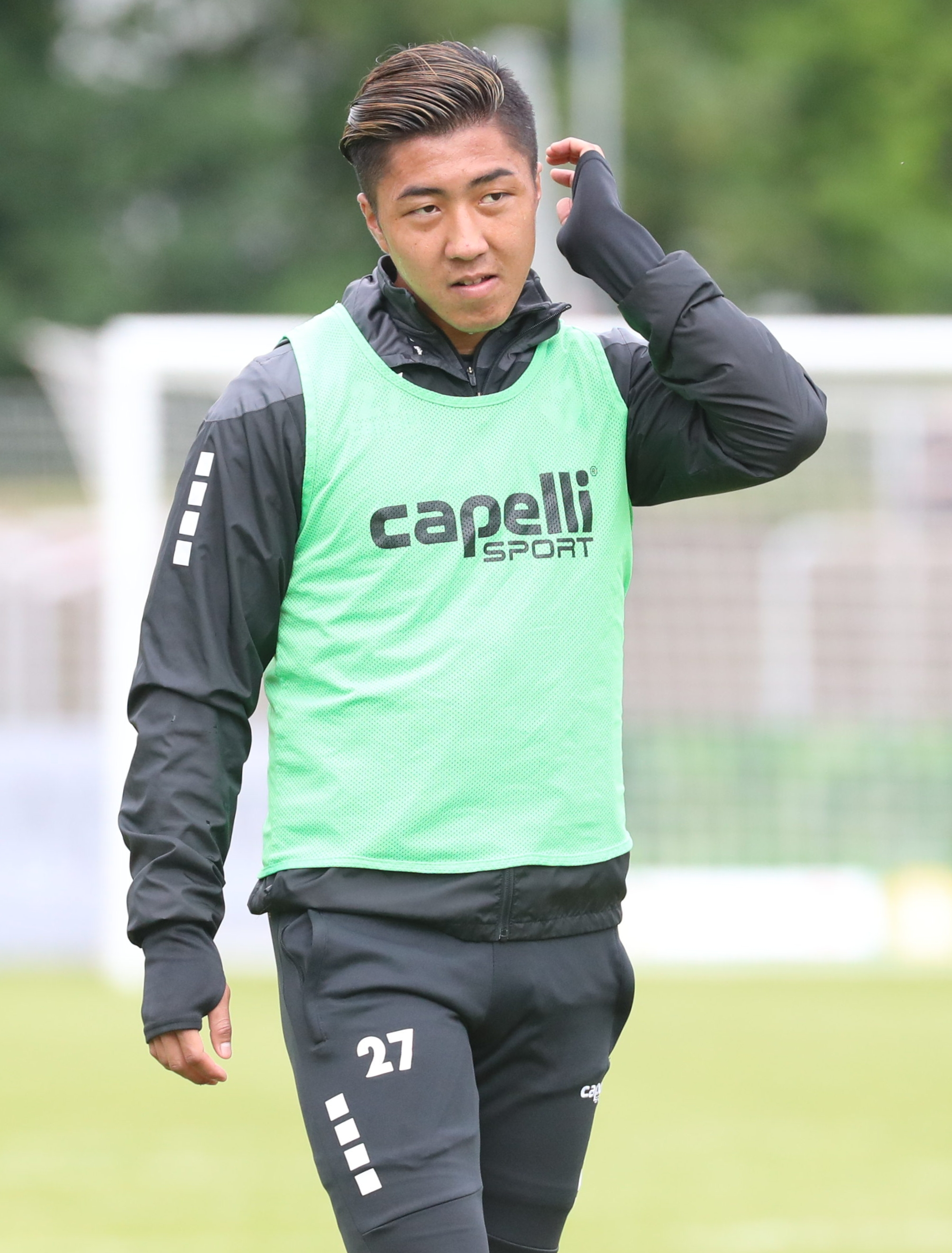
- Yamada in 2022 with Viktoria Berlin

Personal information
- Date of birth: 24 February 1994 (age 32)
- Place of birth: Kyoto, Japan
- Height: 1.75 m (5 ft 9 in)
- Position: Left midfielder

Team information
- Current team: Hertha Zehlendorf
- Number: 15

Youth career
- Berliner AK 07

Senior career*
| Years | Team | Apps | (Gls) |
| 2016 | FC Dorndorf | 16 | (0) |
| 2017 | SpVgg EGC Wirges | 15 | (1) |
| 2017–2018 | Werder Bremen III | 29 | (4) |
| 2018–2019 | BSV Schwarz-Weiß Rehden | 34 | (3) |
| 2019–2022 | Viktoria Berlin | 38 | (2) |
| 2022–2024 | Berliner AK 07 | 58 | (2) |
| 2024–2025 | Bremer SV | 30 | (2) |
| 2025– | Hertha Zehlendorf | 23 | (0) |
- * Club domestic league appearances and goals as of 22 June 2026

Shinji Yamada (born 24 February 1994) is a Japanese professional footballer who plays as a left midfielder for Hertha Zehlendorf.

== Career ==
Yamada joined Regionalliga Nordost club Viktoria Berlin from Regionalliga Nord side BSV Schwarz-Weiß Rehden in August 2019, following manager Benedetto Muzzicato. In April 2020 he agreed a contract extension until 2021 with the club.

In summer 2022, following Viktoria Berlin's relegation from the 3. Liga, Yamada joined city rivals Berliner AK of the Regionalliga Nordost.
