= Panzu Ernesto =

Angolan footballer

Personal information
- Full name: Panzu Ernesto de Angelo
- Date of birth: 3 April 1999 (age 27)
- Place of birth: Berlin, Germany
- Height: 1.80 m (5 ft 11 in)
- Position: Midfielder

Team information
- Current team: Berliner AK 07
- Number: 10

Youth career
- 2011–2016: Hertha BSC

Senior career*
Years	Team	Apps	(Gls)
2016–2021	Hertha BSC II	58	(0)
2021–2022	Berliner AK 07	9	(1)
2023–	Berliner AK 07	12	(0)

International career^{‡}
2013–2014	Germany U15	4	(1)
2014	Germany U16	3	(1)
2020–	Angola	1	(1)
- * Club domestic league appearances and goals as of 24 April 2024 ‡ National team caps and goals as of 30 October 2020

Panzu Ernesto de Angelo (born 3 April 1999) is a professional footballer who plays as a midfielder for Berliner AK 07. Born in Germany, he represents the Angola national team.

== International career ==
Ernesto debuted or Angola in a 3-0 friendly win over Mozambique on 23 October 2020.
