= Polizei SV Berlin =

German football club

- Full name: Polizei Sport-Verein e.V. Berlin
- Founded: 1921
- Dissolved: 1991

Polizei SV Berlin was a German football club from the city of Berlin (SV is the abbreviation of 'Sportverein', i.e., sports club). The early 1920s saw the formation of sports clubs for police and postal workers which included the establishment on 1 June 1921 of Sport-Verein Schutzpolizei Berlin as the club of the city's police force. It was renamed Polizei SV Berlin in 1922 and advanced to play first-division football in the Oberliga Berlin for a single season in 1926–27. They returned to Oberliga play in 1929 for a three-year turn that ended after a 9th-place finish in 1932. In 1930, the club took part in the Berliner Landespokal (Berlin Cup) and went out 1–2 to Minerva Berlin in a quarterfinal match.

== History ==
Germany's regional football leagues were re-organized in 1933 under the Third Reich into 16 top-flight Gauligen. SV did not immediately qualify, but took part in a qualification playoff in 1934 versus Spandauer BC. Each club enjoyed a 2–0 victory over the other before SV won the third and deciding match 4–0. Polizei would be in and out of Gauliga Berlin-Brandenburg (I) play over the next ten years through to the end of World War II. They made their only appearance in national cup play in the opening round of the Tschammerspokal, predecessor to today's DFB-Pokal (German Cup), in 1938, where they were put out by Vorwärts-Rasensport Gleiwitz (2–3). In 1941, the club was renamed Sportgemeinschaft der Ordnungspolizei Berlin. They began the 1944–45 season in second-division play, but re-joined Gauliga competition to take the place of air force team Luftwaffen SV Berlin which was disbanded in September 1944.

Following the war, occupying Allied authorities banned organizations across the country, including sports and football clubs, a part of the process of de-Nazification. Polizei was not re-established until 17 July 1949 under the name Polizei SV Grün-Weiß Berlin. The re-constituted club was banned in 1950, but quickly remade as VfL Sportfreunde Berlin. It took on its identity as a police side again on 31 December 1952 when it returned to its roots as Polizei SV. The division of the city during the Cold War into eastern and western sectors led the formation of a second police club known as SG Volkspolizei Potsdam which became part of the separate competition that emerged in East Germany.

Throughout this period, the SV played as a lower tier local side. The club returned to note in 1957, fielding a strong side in the Amateurliga Berlin (II) that finished second in 1959 and won the division title in 1960. They passed on the opportunity for promotion to the Oberliga Berlin to remain in second-tier play and allowing third-placed BSC Kickers 1900 to advance in their stead, along with vice-champions BFC Südring. That title put Polizei into qualifying play for the German national amateur championship, where they were immediately eliminated (1–3) by 1. FC Kaiserslautern (Amateure).

The team crashed the next year, ending the 1960–61 season at the bottom of the table in 16th place. After a two-year absence, Polizei returned to the Amateurliga in 1963, which had become a third-tier circuit with the formation of the Bundesliga, Germany's new professional first division. They would remain an Amateurliga side until being relegated in 1977. Generally a mid-to-lower-tier club, their best result over this period was a 3rd place earned in 1973–74.

In 1991, the football department of the police club merged with 1. FC Concordia Gropiusstadt-Buckow to create PSV Concordia Gropiusstadt. That club joined VfB Britz in 1999 to form present-day side VfB Concordia Britz.
