= Ranko Petković =

Bosnian and Yugoslav footballer (born 1947)

Personal information
- Date of birth: 21 October 1947 (age 79)
- Place of birth: Sarajevo, FPR Yugoslavia
- Position: Forward

Youth career
- Igman Ilidža

Senior career*
Years	Team	Apps	(Gls)
1965–1968	Igman Ilidža	41	(18)
1968–1976	Sarajevo	174	(34)
1976–1979	Preußen Münster	88	(32)
1979–1981	Rot-Weiß Lüdenscheid	73	(20)
Total		376	(104)
- * Club domestic league appearances and goals

Ranko Petković (Serbian Cyrillic: Ранко Петковић, 21 October 1947) is a retired Bosnian and Yugoslav footballer who played as a forward. He spent the majority of his career with FK Sarajevo in the Yugoslav First League, before eventually moving to the 2nd Bundesliga where he played for five seasons.
