= Willi Kund =

German footballer (1908–1967)

Personal information
- Date of birth: 11 March 1908
- Date of death: 30 August 1967 (aged 59)
- Position: Forward

Senior career*
Years	Team	Apps	(Gls)
- 1. FC Nürnberg

International career
1930–1931	Germany	2	(1)
- * Club domestic league appearances and goals

Willi Kund (11 March 1908 – 30 August 1967) was a German international footballer.
