= SV Babelsberg 03 =

German association football club from Babelsberg, Brandenburg

- Full name: Sportverein Babelsberg 03 e.V.
- Nickname: Nulldrei (Zero-Three)
- Founded: 1903
- Ground: Karl-Liebknecht-Stadion
- Capacity: 10,787
- Chairman: Archibald Horlitz
- Manager: Jörg Buder
- League: Regionalliga Nordost
- 2025–26: Regionalliga Nordost, 11th of 18
- Website: www.babelsberg03.de
Home colours	Away colours	Third colours

SV Babelsberg 03 is a German association football club based in Babelsberg, the largest quarter of the city of Potsdam, on the outskirts of Berlin. The team was founded as Sport-Club Jugendkraft 1903 and again as SG Karl-Marx Babelsberg in 1948 as successor to the pre-war side SpVgg Potsdam 03.

== History ==
Former club crest of SV Babelsberg 03

Playing as SV Nowawes the team gained promotion in 1935 to the first tier Gauliga Berlin-Brandenburg, one of sixteen top flight divisions formed in the re-organization of German football under the Third Reich. The club was relegated after just three seasons at that level never finishing better than eighth in their ten team division. The club returned to the Gauliga as SpVgg Potsdam in 1943 and earned third- and fourth-place finishes in the two years before the end of World War II.

=== Postwar play in East Germany ===
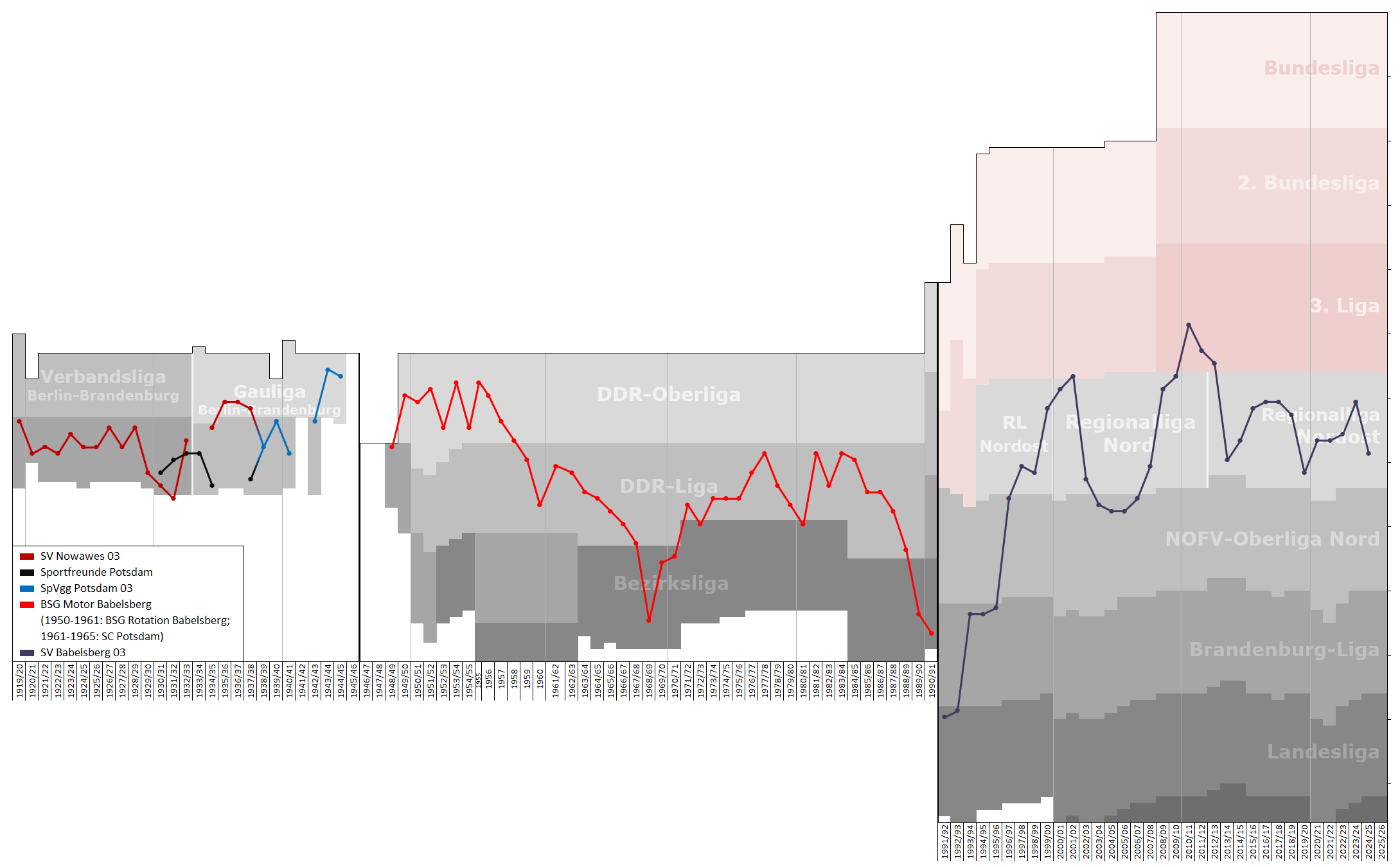
Historical chart of SV Babelsberg league performance

Following the war, occupying Allied authorities ordered the dissolution of all organizations in the country, including sports and football associations. The former membership of SpVgg was re-organized as SG Karl Marx Babelsberg in 1948 in the Soviet-occupied eastern half of the country. On 1 August 1949, they merged with the local club SG Drewitz and the following year were renamed BSG Motor Babelsberg.

Logo of BSG Motor Babelsberg

The side was a perennial second division team in East Germany's DDR-Liga with the exception of short spells in the third tier in 1968–71, 1972–73, and 1980–81. The club's record in league matches and in regular FDGB-Pokal (East German Cup) tournament appearances was undistinguished. Just prior to German reunification the team suffered relegation from the second division.

=== Post-unification ===
On 10 December 1991 Motor adopted the name Sportverein Babelsberg 03. They remained a lower division side in the united Germany until breaking through to the NOFV-Oberliga Nord (IV) in 1996. The team's budget increased tenfold in the period from 1996 to 1999. They immediately captured the league title there and won promotion to the Regionalliga Nordost (III). A second-place finish in 2001 in what had become the Regionalliga Nord (III) advanced the club to the 2. Bundesliga. SV also played its first DFB-Pokal (German Cup) matches in 2000 and 2001, but was eliminated in the early rounds.

Babelsberg's time in the second division was a short one. They finished at the bottom of the table and by 2003–04 had fallen back to the Oberliga (IV). The club declared bankruptcy in 2003 but managed to continue playing through the adoption of a creditor supported bankruptcy plan. SV fielded strong sides and achieved several top three finishes until they were promoted to the Regionalliga Nord (III) for the 2007–08 campaign. In 2009–10 season Babelsberg were promoted back to the 3. Liga after finishing champions of the Regionalliga Nord. After three seasons at this level the club was relegated again in 2013 and now plays in the Regionalliga Nordost again.

== Supporters ==
Filmstadt Inferno 99
- Abbreviation: FI 99
- Established: 1999
- Type: Ultras club
- Headquarters: Potsdam, Germany
- Stand: North
- Affiliations: St. Pauli

Filmstadt Inferno 99 are the clubs ultras group. The fanatics stand in the North part of the stadium. The supporters hold left-wing and anti-fascist political views. As a result, they have strong friendships with St. Pauli and Celtic. They also had a strong friendship with Partizan Minsk, but this was discontinued after the club was disbanded.

Babelsberg 03 have a fierce rivalry with nearby club Energie Cottbus, a faction of whose supporters hold far-right political views.

== Honours ==
The club's honours:

- Bezirksliga Potsdam (III)
  - Champions: 1973
- Bezirksliga Potsdam-Süd (III)
  - Champions: 1981
- Verbandsliga Brandenburg (V)
  - Champions: 1996
- NOFV-Oberliga Nord (IV)
  - Champions: 1997, 2007
- Regionalliga Nord (III-IV)
  - Champions: 2010
  - Runners-up: 2001
- Brandenburg Cup
  - Winners: 1999, 2000, 2006, 2007, 2008, 2009, 2010, 2011, 2016, 2021
  - Runners-up: 2001, 2005, 2012, 2014, 2020, 2024

== Current squad ==
As of 8 September 2026

Note: Flags indicate national team as defined under FIFA eligibility rules; some limited exceptions apply. Players may hold more than one non-FIFA nationality.

No.	Pos.	Nation	Player
1	GK	GER	Maximus Babke
2	DF	GER	Maximilian Kalckreuth
3	DF	GER	Jannis Lang
5	DF	GER	Kenny Weyh
6	MF	GER	Paul Wegener
7	FW	GER	Samir Werbelow
8	MF	GER	Lukas Lämmel
9	FW	GER	Joshua Okpalaike
10	FW	GER	Matthew Meier
11	FW	GER	Tino Schmidt
14	MF	MNE	Marko Perović
15	MF	GER	Aris Bayindir
16	DF	BEN	Amiro Amadou

No.	Pos.	Nation	Player
17	DF	GER	Noah Salaske
18	FW	GER	Amadeus Ebel
19	GK	GER	Niclas Müller
20	DF	GER	Tobias Hasse
21	FW	KOR	Kang Min-gi
23	MF	GER	Mika Malzahn
24	FW	GER	Jesaja Herrmann
25	FW	GER	Theo Ogbidi
26	FW	GER	Ardahan Yilmaz
27	DF	GER	Gordon Büch
28	DF	GER	Laurin von Piechowski
29	FW	GER	Simon Gollnack
33	MF	GER	Tom Berger
