= Hans Theilig =

German handball player (1914-1976)

Medal record

Men's field handball

Representing Germany

Olympic Games
Gold medal – first place	1936 Berlin	Team competition

Indoor World Championship
Gold medal – first place	1938 Germany	Team competition

Hans Theilig (12 August 1914 in Hamburg – 6 October 1976) was a German field handball player who competed in the 1936 Summer Olympics.

He was part of the German field handball team, which won the gold medal. He played two matches.

He was also on the team that won gold medals at the inaugural Indoor World Championship, and was joint top scorer at the event with 6 goals.

He was also the first ever player to score a goal for the Germany men's national handball team.
