= Ludwig Günderoth =

German footballer (1910–1994)

Personal information
- Date of birth: 2 November 1910
- Date of death: 1 March 1994 (aged 83)
- Position: Forward

Senior career*
Years	Team	Apps	(Gls)
1929–1946	Waldhof Mannheim		
1943	→ VfR Mannheim		
1946–1947	VfR Mannheim		

Managerial career
- 1956: Waldhof Mannheim
- 1966: Waldhof Mannheim
- 1978: Waldhof Mannheim
- * Club domestic league appearances and goals

Ludwig Günderoth (2 November 1910 – 1 March 1994) was a German football striker and later manager.
