= Minerva Berlin =

German football club

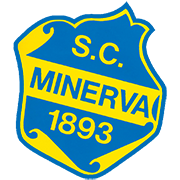
- Full name: Sport-Club Minerva 1893 e.V. Berlin
- Founded: 11 May 1893
- Ground: Minervaplatz, Chausseestraße
- Capacity: 5,000
- League: Kreisliga A Berlin (IX)
- 2015–16: Kreisliga B Berlin Staffel 5 (X), 1st (promoted)
Home colours	Away colours

Minerva 93 Berlin is a German association football club from the district of Moabit in the city of Berlin. The club was established 10 May 1893 as Berliner Fußball Club Minerva taking its name from the Roman goddess of wisdom. A merger with Wilmersdorfer FC Frühling in 1896 led to the club taking on the name Sport-Club Minerva 93 Berlin.

== History ==
=== Foundation to WWII ===
In 1900, the team played a single season as part of the Freie Berliner Fußballvereinigung (FBF), one of several early competing top-tier leagues in Berlin. They were joined in 1904 by Berolina Moabit – also part of the FBF in 1900 – and Saxonia Berlin, and returned to the top-flight that season in the Berliner Meisterschaft (I). Minerva remained a first division club for most for the next 50 years.

After being relegated in 1906, the team re-appeared in the Berliner Meisterschaft in 1908. A unified Berlin-Brandenberg first division began play with the 1911–12 season and Minerva enjoyed their best finish to date with a 3rd-place result in the league's Staffel B. Over the next dozen years they were generally a lower to mid-table side, repeating their 3rd place showing in 1915 and earning a second-place finish in 1921, before being sent down after a 10th-place result in 1924.

Minerva was much improved on their return to the Berlin-Brandenberg Oberliga (I) in 1926. They won a number of top three finishes over the next ten years. This included a first-place finish in the Oberliga Staffel A in 1932, followed by the team's only appearance in the national playoffs where they were put out in an eighth-final match by Bayern Munich.

=== Play during the Third Reich ===
Germany football was re-organized under the Third Reich in 1933 into 16 regional top-flight divisions. Minerva became part of the Gauliga Berlin-Brandenburg (I) and returned to the role of a middling side. A second-place finish in 1936 was immediately followed by a 9th-place result and relegation.

The team immediately bounced back by capturing the Bezirksliga Berlin (II) and spent the next six seasons in Gauliga play before again being relegated in 1944. By this time, World War II had overtaken the country and football became more local in character due to the danger and expense of travel. Manpower shortages led to wartime mergers between clubs known as Kriegsspielgemeinshaft; Minerva joined Spandauer SV to play the incomplete 1944–45 season as KSG Minerva 93/SSV Berlin.

=== Postwar play ===
Following the war, occupying Allied forces disbanded most organizations in the country, including sports and football clubs, as part of the process of denazification. Football clubs were soon reformed and the former membership was reorganized as SG Tiergarten which played in the postwar Stadtliga Berlin, Staffel C in 1945–47. As SG Tiergarten-Minerva the team was part of the Landesliga Berlin in 1947–48 where they finished atop Staffel A and moved on to the restored Oberliga Berlin (I) to play a single season that ended in relegation. Now playing again as SC Minerva 93 Berlin, they won another second division title in the Amateurliga Berlin and returned to the Oberliga for another 8 seasons. Their best results were second-place finishes in 1954 and 1956.

At the end of the 1950s, Minerva slipped out of top-flight competition into the Amateurliga Berlin (II) where they remained until disappearing into lower tier city competition in the mid-1960s. Today the team plays in Berlin's Kreisliga B (X).

The club fielded successful youth sides through the 1980s and in 1987 were awarded the Sepp Herberger Prize by the DFB (Deutscher Fußball-Bund; German Football Association) in recognition for their youth work. However, by 2000, Minerva did not have a single youth side remaining. They have since renewed their commitment to youth and again have an active youth department.
