= 1936–37 Allsvenskan (men's handball) =

Swedish handball season

Allsvenskan
- 1936–37

Tournament information
- Sport: Handball
- Teams: 7

Final positions
- Champions: Stockholms-Flottans IF

The 1936–37 Allsvenskan was the third season of the top division of Swedish handball. Seven teams competed in the league. Stockholms-Flottans IF won the league, but the title of Swedish Champions was awarded to the winner of Svenska mästerskapet. IFK Kristianstad were relegated.

== League table ==
Pos	Team	Pld	W	D	L	GF	GA	GD	Pts
1	Stockholms-Flottans IF	12	8	1	3	123	104	19	17
2	Flottans IF Karlskrona	12	7	1	4	138	107	31	15
3	Redbergslids IK	12	6	1	5	161	133	28	13
4	SoIK Hellas	12	6	0	6	128	122	6	12
5	Majornas IK	12	6	0	6	134	129	5	12
6	Göteborgs IK	12	3	2	7	110	155	−45	8
7	IFK Kristianstad	12	3	1	8	131	175	−44	7

== Attendance ==
Team	Attendance
IFK Kristianstad	1146
Flottans IF Karlskrona	1099
Redbergslids IK	770
SoIK Hellas	692
Majornas IK	673
Stockholms-Flottans IF	479
Göteborgs IK	396
