= LSV Berlin =

German football club

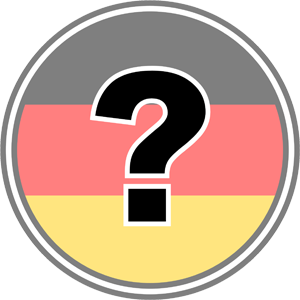
- Full name: Luftwaffensportverein Berlin
- Founded: 1943
- Dissolved: 1944
| Home colours | Away colours |

LSV Berlin was a short-lived German association football club from the city of Berlin. It served as the sports club for Luftwaffe (German air force) personnel in the city during World War II and disappeared with the end of the conflict.

== History ==
The formation of military-based sports and football clubs was common under the Third Reich and they took part in the country's established football competition alongside traditional civilian clubs.

German football was re-organized under the Reich's politically motivated sports policies in 1933 into sixteen top-flight regional divisions. Luftwaffensportverein Berlin was a latecomer to the Gauliga Berlin-Brandenburg, joining the top-flight division for the 1943–44 season and earning a 2nd-place result.

As the tide of the war turned against Germany and Allied forces invaded the country, most military football sides were disbanded. LSV Berlin was lost in September 1944, before the start of the 1944–45 season, its place in the Oberliga being taken by SG OrPo Berlin.

== Stadium ==
LSV played its home matches in Steitstaße Spandau or Mommsenstadion (capacity 37,570).
