= Alfred Schmalzer =

Austrian handball player (1912-1944)

Olympic medal record

Men's handball
Silver medal – second place	1936 Berlin	Team competition

Alfred Schmalzer (28 October 1912 – 21 January 1944) was an Austrian field handball player who competed in the 1936 Summer Olympics. He was part of the Austrian field handball team, which won the silver medal. He played three matches, including the final.

He was killed in action during World War II.
