= Anton Perwein =

Austrian handball player (1911-1981)

Olympic medal record

Men's handball
Silver medal – second place	1936 Berlin	Team competition

Anton Perwein (10 November 1911 – 14 December 1981) was an Austrian field handball player who competed in the 1936 Summer Olympics.

He was part of the Austrian field handball team, which won the silver medal. He played three matches including the final.
