= Berliner AK 07 =

German association football club from Berlin

- Full name: Berliner Athletik-Klub 1907 e. V.
- Founded: 15 December 1907; 118 years ago
- Ground: Poststadion
- Capacity: 10,000
- Chairman: Mehmet Ali Han
- Manager: Ersan Parlatan
- League: NOFV-Oberliga Nord
- 2025–26: NOFV-Oberliga Nord, 13th of 16
- Website: http://www.bak07.de/
Home colours	Away colours

Berliner AK 07 is a German football club based in the locality of Moabit of the borough of Mitte in Berlin, Germany. The team competes in the fifth tier NOFV-Oberliga Nord.

== History ==
The association was established on 15 December 1907 in the Wedding district of Berlin as an athletics club interested primarily in running. A football department was formed in 1908 which has since remained a largely anonymous side playing in lower tier city competition. In the early 90s AK 07 played in the sixth division Landesliga Berlin and advanced to the Verbandsliga Berlin (V) on the strength of a 1995 championship there. A 1999 Verbandsliga title saw the club further promoted to the NOFV-Oberliga Nord (IV).

AK 07 merged with BSV Mitte in 2004: Mitte had earlier been formed out of the merger of the ethnically Turkish sides BFC Güneyspor and Fenerbahçe Berlin. The restructured association formed a co-operative relationship with Turkish first division club Ankaraspor in June 2006 which focuses on player development in Germany.

On 6 July 2006 the club adopted the name Berlin Ankaraspor Kulübü 07 and selected Ahmet Gökcek, son of the mayor of Ankara, as chairman. With the name change the club also abandoned its traditional colours of red and white to don the blue and white kit of Ankaraspor, but later reverted to its old name and colours.

The club won promotion to the Regionalliga Nord in 2011 and achieved a German Cup upset when it defeated Bundesliga side 1899 Hoffenheim 4–0 in 2012.

Since 2024 the club plays in the NOFV-Oberliga Nord.

== Stadium ==
Berliner AK 07 played its home fixtures in the Sportanlage Lüderitzstraße (capacity 3,000) with an interlude (2000–2003) spent at the Hanne-Sobek-Sportanlage. The team has moved to the 20,000 seat Friedrich-Ludwig-Jahn-Sportpark in Berlin's Prenzlauer Berg district at the start of the 2006–07 season and currently play at the Poststadion.

== Current squad ==
As of 1 March 2024

Note: Flags indicate national team as defined under FIFA eligibility rules; some limited exceptions apply. Players may hold more than one non-FIFA nationality.

No.	Pos.	Nation	Player
1	GK	GER	Luis Zwick
3	DF	GER	Aleksandar Bilbija
4	DF	GER	Rocco Capoano
5	DF	GER	Nicolo Avellino
6	MF	GER	Omar Hajjaj
7	DF	PLE	Ahmad Rmieh
8	MF	GER	Marcel Bremer
9	FW	GER	Jamal Rogero
10	DF	ANG	Panzu Ernesto
11	FW	GER	Felix Pliger
14	FW	SLE	Abu-Bakarr Kargbo
15	MF	USA	Joel Bustamante
17	FW	NGA	Ufumwen Osawe

No.	Pos.	Nation	Player
18	MF	GER	Olivér Schindler
19	FW	TUR	Semih Kayan
20	FW	GER	Selim Gündüz
22	DF	GER	Hendrik Wurr
23	MF	TUR	Ali Baran Akdag
24	DF	GER	Cedrik Mvondo
25	MF	CRO	Roko Ivanković
26	MF	ALG	Moussa Belaid
27	MF	TUR	Umut Satici
29	FW	GER	Antonio Lubaki
33	GK	GER	Kilian Schubert
61	MF	TUR	Cihan Uçar
81	DF	JPN	Shinji Yamada

== Former players ==
- (Germany) Kemal Halat
- (Sri Lanka) Ahmed Waseem Razeek

== Honours ==
The club's honours:

- Landesliga Berlin (VI)
  - Champions: 1995
- Verbandsliga Berlin (V)
  - Champions: 1999
- Berliner Landespokal
  - Winners: 2010, 2012
  - Runner-up: 2021
