= Jaroslav Volak =

Austrian handball player (born 1915)

Olympic medal record

Men's handball
Silver medal – second place	1936 Berlin	Team competition

Jaroslav Volak (born 7 July 1915, date of death unknown) was an Austrian field handball player who competed in the 1936 Summer Olympics. He was part of the Austrian field handball team, which won the silver medal. He played three matches including the final.
