= TuS Altrip =

German football club

- Full name: Turn- und Sportverein 1906 e.V. Altrip
- Founded: 1906
- Ground: Am Rheindamm
- League: B-Klasse Mittelhardt (X)
- 2018–19: 4th
Home colours	Away colours

TuS Altrip is a German football club from the municipality of Altrip, Rhineland-Palatinate.

== History ==
The club was established 13 August 1906 as the gymnastics club Turnverein Altrip and in 1911 it opened a football department. TV adopted the name Turn- und Sportverein Altrip in 1920. Four years later the football department became independent as Sportverein Altrip. Sometime around 1933 the footballers were reunited with their parent club.

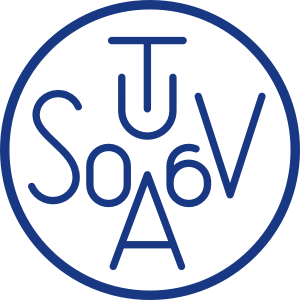
Historical logo of TuS Altrip.

TuS won promotion to the Amateurliga Südwest (III) in 1961 and were sent down in 1964. They made a single season appearance there in 1965–66 but fared poorly. They returned to Amateurliga play for a three-season turn from 1971 to 1974. After two consecutive 6th-place finishes they crashed to 16th in 1974 and were relegated.

Most recently the footballers played in the Bezirksliga Vorderpfalz, followed by the A- and B-Klassen Mittelhardt and are part of a larger sports club that includes departments for athletics, badminton, and gymnastics.
