= Hertha Zehlendorf =

Association football club in Germany

- Full name: Fußball-Club Hertha 03 Zehlendorf e.V.
- Nickname: Kleine Hertha
- Founded: 10 March 1903; 123 years ago
- Ground: Ernst-Reuter-Sportfeld
- Capacity: 4,000
- Chairman: Kamyar Niroumand
- Manager: Timo Szumnarski
- League: Oberliga NOFV-Nord (V)
- 2025–26: Regionalliga Nordost, 18th of 18 (relegated)
Home colours	Away colours

Hertha Zehlendorf is a German football club from the suburb of Zehlendorf in Berlin, currently playing in Oberliga NOFV-Nord, the fifth tier of German football.

The department has developed a number of international players for Germany and other countries.

== History ==
=== 1903–1945 ===
The club was formed by 30 local football enthusiasts on 10 March 1903, under the name of Thor- und Fußballclub Germania 03 Zehlendorf. By 1909, it had however changed its name to FC Hertha Zehlendorf. In 1913, the club moved to a new ground, Siebenendenweg, now called Ernst-Reuter-Sportfeld, away from the Tempelhofer Feld, where it was never entirely happy. The team was for a time part of BFC Hertha 1892 but by September 1914 the club became independent again, under the name of FC Hertha 06 Zehlendorf.

After the end of the First World War, in January 1919, the club merged with local side VfB Zehlendorf 03 to form the current club, FC Hertha 03 Zehlendorf. It was from this union that the club took its foundation date.

For the next decade, the club did not particularly stand out within the ranks of Berlin football clubs. In 1933, it finally won a championship in the local Kreisklasse. However, they missed out on being promoted when German football league system was restructured with the introduction of the top-flight Gauliga.

The club struggled through this period and eventually had to form an on-the-field relationship with Union 24 Lichterfelde to survive. During the Second World War, play came almost completely to a halt.

=== 1945–1963 ===
After the war, all previously existing clubs and associations were outlawed in Berlin and the former Hertha existed under the name of SG Zehlendorf for a while. It entered the Amateurliga Berlin (II) in 1947, a league that was played in a number of regional groups. It however became the first club in Berlin to receive a license in 1948 to revert to its original name by the allied occupation authorities.

On the field, the club qualified for the single-division Amateurliga in 1950 and immediately became a strong side in this league, winning the championship in 1953. The club's youth side took out its first Berlin championship in 1950, a game played as a curtain raiser for a Germany versus Turkey friendly, in front of 60,000, on 17 June 1951. Germany lost 1–2, but Zehlendorf beat Hertha BSC 3–2.

The team entered the tier-one Oberliga Berlin for the 1953–54 season, were all the big names of West Berlin football were playing in those days. It found life at this level much harder and was immediately relegated again, finishing 11th out of 12 teams. Back in the Amateurliga, another championship was won and the club earned the right to return to the Oberliga.

In this league, the team would stay until 1963, earning lower table finishes each season but surviving nevertheless. Hertha in this time earned much more local success with its youth teams, a fact not much changed even today, winning Berlin championship in various age groups over the years.

=== 1963–74: Regionalliga years ===
In 1963, West German football was fundamentally changed with the introduction of the Bundesliga. Below it, five regional leagues, the Regionalligas, were formed. Hertha did not apply for a spot in the new Bundesliga as only one club from Berlin was admitted and the bigger names in local football, Hertha BSC and Tasmania 1900 Berlin far out qualified the little club.

Instead, the club qualified for the new tier-two Regionalliga Berlin, a league it would belong to until its disbanding in 1974. In this league, Hertha continued its existence as an average side, at least for the first couple of seasons. From 1965, the club's results improved and it developed into an upper table side.

In 1968–69, the team achieved its greatest success so far, winning the Regionalliga and thereby qualifying for the promotion round to the Bundesliga. In this competition, the club came fourth out of five teams, when only the winner, Rot-Weiß Oberhausen, qualified for promotion.

The following season, the team repeated its success; winning the league once more and getting another try at Bundesliga promotion. The club finished one rank better this time, coming third but the Bundesliga spot went to Kickers Offenbach. The club took out the second edition of the West German under-19 championship that year, a huge success for the Hertha.

From 1970 onwards, the club returned to its mid-table existence, staying out of relegation trouble but also not really in contention for another championship either. In 1970–71, Tasmania 1900 was all to dominating anyway, winning the league title and going broke two seasons later.

For Hertha, the year 1974 was the last as a second division team, the introduction of the 2. Bundesligas meaning the end for the five Regionalligas. To qualify for the new 2. Bundesliga Nord, the club had to be one of the two top clubs in its league but a fourth spot was not enough and it was demoted to the tier-three Amateurliga Berlin instead.

=== 1974–present ===
Hertha missed out on the league championship there in its first season, coming second by a point to Spandauer SV, who won promotion to the second division. The next three seasons, the club spent in midfield but its youth teams once more impressed, reaching the final in both the under-19 and the under-17 German championships in 1978.

In 1978–79, it managed to win the league. This entitled the club to take part in the promotion round to the 2. Bundesliga. It had to play OSC Bremerhaven and beat the opposition 5–4 in Berlin. In Bremerhaven it held a 0–0 until four minutes from the end, seeing itself already in the second division but then OSC scored the winning goal and earned promotion on the away goal rule. Its Berlin title qualified the club for the German amateur football championship, too, where it went all the way to the final and lost to ESV Ingolstadt.

The club continued to be a driving force in what was now renamed Amateur Oberliga Berlin, finishing in the top five all but once in the next twelve seasons. In 1981–82, another highlight followed, coming second in the league to Tennis Borussia Berlin, on equal points but falling nine goals short. The team returned to the German amateur championship, where the FSV Mainz 05 proved too strong in the semi-finals, winning both games. Thirdly, the club also qualified for the DFB-Pokal on the strength of a Berliner Landespokal win. It drew Hertha BSC for the first round and, in front of 12,000 spectators, the score was two all after regular time but then the big Hertha scored two more goals and knocked the little Hertha out of the cup. Little Hertha (German: Kleine Hertha) is the long-standing nickname of the club, referring to the fact that Hertha BSC was always the bigger and more successful of the two Herthas.

The season after, the club came second in the league once more, this time to SC Charlottenburg, and earned another shot at the amateur championship but this time, the FC Bayern Munich II in the first round was as far as it went.

In 1988, the club's under-17's finally took out the West German championship, beating southern powerhouse VfB Stuttgart 2–1 in the final with later German international Christian Ziege in Zehlendorf's line-up. The year after, wealthy FC Bayern Munich managed to beat the amateur club's youth team on penalties only in the final.

From 1988 to 1990, the Oberliga Berlin became the scene of Hertha's struggle with Reinickendorfer Füchse for the league championship but both times Reinickendorf won the upper hand. Each time, Hertha only earned the right to compete for the amateur championship again and each time it lost in the first round.

1990–91 was the Oberliga Berlin's last season, the German reunion also affected football and the NOFV-Oberliga was established instead. Hertha became part of the NOFV-Oberliga Mitte, a league dominated by 1. FC Union Berlin in its short three-year existence and Zehlendorf managed only average performances. Nevertheless, it did qualify for the new tier-three Regionalliga Nordost in 1994. In a league full of former East German football powerhouses, the team struggled for four seasons before being relegated in 1998.

The club managed to only survive two seasons in the NOFV-Oberliga Nord (IV) before another relegation, now to the tier-five Verbandsliga Berlin. It played in this league, renamed the Berlin-Liga in 2008, until 2014 when a championship took the club back to the NOFV-Oberliga Nord.

== Honours ==
The club's honours:

=== League ===
- German amateur football championship
  - Runners-up: 1979
- Regionalliga Berlin (II): 2
  - Winners: 1969, 1970
- Amateurliga Berlin (II): 1
  - Winners: 1953
- Oberliga Berlin (III): 1
  - Winners: 1979
  - Runners-up: 1975, 1982, 1983, 1989, 1990
- Berlin-Liga (VI): 1
  - Champions: 2014

=== Cup ===
- Berlin Cup: 3
  - Winners: 1977, 1982, 1989
  - Runners-up: 1968, 1969, 1974, 1975, 1990, 1996

=== Youth ===
- German Under 19 Championship: 1
  - Winners: 1970
  - Runners-up: 1978
- German Under 17 Championship: 1
  - Winners: 1988
  - Runners-up: 1978, 1989

== Past managers ==
Manager	From	Until
Wolfgang Przesdzing	1 July 1983	10 November 1986
Stefan Sprey	11 November 1986	7 January 1990
Adolf Remy	8 January 1990	30 June 1990
Gino Ferrin	1 July 1990	30 June 1992
Peter Ränke	1 July 1992	2 May 1994
Gerd Pröger	3 May 1994	30 June 1994
Thomas Grunenberg	1 July 1994	16 February 1996
Gerd Pröger	16 February 1996	25 March 1997
Gino Ferrin	26 March 1997	30 June 1997

== Recent seasons ==
The recent season-by-season performance of the club:

Season	Division	Tier	Position
1999–2000	NOFV-Oberliga Nord	IV	14th ↓
2000–01	Verbandsliga Berlin	V	8th
2001–02	Verbandsliga Berlin	V	5th
2002–03	Verbandsliga Berlin	V	4th
2003–04	Verbandsliga Berlin	V	7th
2004–05	Verbandsliga Berlin	V	3rd
2005–06	Verbandsliga Berlin	V	3rd
2006–07	Verbandsliga Berlin	V	7th
2007–08	Verbandsliga Berlin	V	4th
2008–09	Berlin-Liga	VI	6th
2009–10	Berlin-Liga	VI	3rd
2010–11	Berlin-Liga	VI	14th
2011–12	Berlin-Liga	VI	6th
2012–13	Berlin-Liga	VI	10th
2013–14	Berlin-Liga	VI	1st ↑
2014–15	NOFV-Oberliga Nord	V	9th
2015–16	NOFV-Oberliga Nord	V	3rd
2016–17	NOFV-Oberliga Nord	V	4th
2017–18	NOFV-Oberliga Nord	V	4th
2018–19	NOFV-Oberliga Nord	V	4th
2019–20	NOFV-Oberliga Nord	V	4th
2020–21	NOFV-Oberliga Nord	V	6th
2021–22	NOFV-Oberliga Nord	V	2nd
2022–23	NOFV-Oberliga Nord	V	4th
2023–24	NOFV-Oberliga Nord	V	1st ↑
2024–25	Regionalliga Nordost	IV	12th
2025-26	Regionalliga Nordost	IV	18th ↓

- With the introduction of the Regionalligas in 1994 and the 3. Liga in 2008 as the new third tier, below the 2. Bundesliga, all leagues below dropped one tier. In 2008 the Verbandsliga Berlin was renamed Berlin-Liga.

↑ Promoted	↓ Relegated

== Current squad ==
As of 6 February 2026

Note: Flags indicate national team as defined under FIFA eligibility rules; some limited exceptions apply. Players may hold more than one non-FIFA nationality.

No.	Pos.	Nation	Player
1	GK	GRE	Alexios Dedidis
2	DF	ITA	Rocco Capoano
3	DF	GER	Ernes Smailovic
4	DF	GER	Jake Wilton
6	MF	GER	Davud Keskin
7	MF	GER	Diren-Mehmet Günay
8	MF	SUI	Nathan Wicht
9	DF	GER	Jonas Burda
10	FW	POL	Daniel Krasucki
11	MF	GER	Iba May
13	DF	GER	Jules Hasenberg
15	MF	JPN	Shinji Yamada
16	FW	GER	Nicolas Hebisch
17	MF	GER	Ben Schulz

No.	Pos.	Nation	Player
18	MF	GER	Stanley Keller
20	MF	GER	Sven Reimann
21	DF	GER	Cenker Yoldas
22	MF	GER	Ron Wachs
23	FW	GER	Niklas Doll
24	FW	GER	Ernesto Carratala-Jimenez
25	GK	UKR	Dmytro Karika
26	FW	USA	Noah Jones
27	FW	GER	Patrick-Emmanuel Abé
28	DF	GER	Nanitonda Quiala
29	DF	GER	Fabian Bunger
30	DF	GER	Louis Schulze
-	GK	GER	Cedric Wermund

== Former Hertha 03 players ==
The following players developed through the club's youth system to become professionals:

Male

- Michael Krampitz
- Michael Kellner
- Volkmar Gross
- Uwe Kliemann
- Klaus-Peter Hanisch
- Wolfgang Sühnholz
- Norbert Stolzenburg
- Christian Sackewitz
- Pierre Littbarski
- Martino Gatti
- Karsten Bäron
- Christian Ziege
- Marcus Feinbier
- Carsten Ramelow
- Niko Kovač
- Robert Kovač
- Thorben Marx
- Benjamin Siegert
- Malik Fathi
- Sofian Chahed
- Sejad Salihović
- Sebastian Stachnik
- Cem Efe
- Ümit Karan

Female

- Ariane Hingst
- Inken Becher

== DFB-Pokal appearances ==
The club has qualified for the first round of the DFB-Pokal six times:

Season	Round	Date	Home	Away	Result	Attendance
DFB-Pokal 1974–75	First round	7 September 1974	Heidenheimer SB	Hertha Zehlendorf	2–2 aet	
DFB-Pokal 1974–75	First round replay	14 September 1974	Hertha Zehlendorf	Heidenheimer SB	5–0	
DFB-Pokal 1974–75	Second round	20 September 1974	FC Schalke 04	Hertha Zehlendorf	6–0	
DFB-Pokal 1975–76	First round	5 August 1975	Hertha Zehlendorf	Blumenthaler SV	0–1 aet	
DFB-Pokal 1976–77	First round	6 August 1976	Hertha Zehlendorf	TuS Mayen	1–0	
DFB-Pokal 1976–77	Second round	18 October 1976	Eintracht Frankfurt	Hertha Zehlendorf	10–2	
DFB-Pokal 1977–78	First round	29 July 1977	1. FSV Mainz 05	Hertha Zehlendorf	7–1	
DFB-Pokal 1982–83	First round	27 August 1982	Hertha Zehlendorf	Hertha BSC	2–4	
DFB-Pokal 1989–90	First round	20 August 1989	Hertha Zehlendorf	1. FC Nürnberg	0–4	

== Sources ==
- Das deutsche Fußball-Archiv historical German domestic league tables (in German)
- Deutsche Liga-Chronik seit 1945 – Kapitel F: Berlin/Nordost (in German) Historical German football tables since 1945, publisher: DSFS, published: 2006, pages: F3 – F82
- List of all German under-19 champions 1969–2008 DFB website
- List of all German under-17 champions 1977–2008 DFB website
