= 1974–75 Tennis Borussia Berlin season =

Tennis Borussia Berlin
1974–75 season
- Manager: Georg Gawliczek
- Stadium: Mommsenstadion
- Bundesliga: 17th (relegated)
- DFB-Pokal: Fourth Round
- Top goalscorer: League: Norbert Stolzenburg (13); All: Norbert Stolzenburg (14)
- Highest home attendance: 75,000 (vs. Hertha BSC)
- Lowest home attendance: 1,500 (vs. Wuppertaler SV)
- Average home league attendance: 10,591

The 1974–75 season was the first time Tennis Borussia Berlin played in the Fußball-Bundesliga, the highest tier of the German football league system. After 34 league games, Tennis Borussia finished in 17th position, second from the bottom of the table, only one place above Wuppertaler SV. The club reached the fourth round of the DFB-Pokal; eventually losing 2–1 away to VfB Stuttgart II. Thirteen of their 38 league goals were scored by striker Norbert Stolzenburg.

== 1974–75 Tennis Borussia Berlin squad ==
No.	Pos.	Nation	Player
—	GK	FRG	Hubert Birkenmeier
—	GK	FRG	Manfred Wittke
—	DF	FRG	Peter Eggert
—	DF	FRG	Stephan Hoffmann
—	DF	FRG	Hans-Georg Kraus
—	DF	FRG	Wolfgang Mulack
—	DF	FRG	Werner Novak
—	DF	FRG	Jürgen Rumor
—	DF	FRG	Karl-Heinz Schnellinger
—	DF	FRG	Norbert Siegmann
—	DF	FRG	Joachim Thiel
—	MF	FRG	Reinhard Adler

No.	Pos.	Nation	Player
—	MF	FRG	Gino Ferrin
—	MF	FRG	Jürgen Schulz
—	MF	FRG	Gerd Schwidrowski
—	FW	FRG	Peter Geyer
—	FW	FRG	Dietmar Mürdter
—	FW	FRG	Hans Sprenger
—	FW	FRG	Norbert Stolzenburg
—	FW	FRG	Karlheinz Subklewe
—	FW	FRG	Wolfgang Sühnholz
—	MF	FRG	Ditmar Jakobs (joined September 1974)
—	FW	FRG	Albert Bittlmayer (joined October 1974)

== 1974–75 fixtures ==
=== Bundesliga ===
24 August 1974	Eintracht Braunschweig	5–0	Tennis Borussia Berlin	Eintracht-Stadion, Braunschweig
15:30	Bründl 2'; Frank 14'; Gersdorff 30', 60'; Haebermann 70'	Report		Attendance: 22,000; Referee: Hans-Joachim Weyland (Oberhausen)

31 August 1974	Tennis Borussia Berlin	4–0	SV Werder Bremen	Mommsenstadion, Berlin
15:30	Geyer 14', 24', 89'; Stolzenburg 76'; Siegmann (yellow card)	Report		Attendance: 8,700; Referee: Gert Meuser (Ingelheim)

10 September 1974	Borussia Mönchengladbach	3–1	Tennis Borussia Berlin	Bökelbergstadion, Mönchengladbach
20:00	Bonhof 36' (pen.); Wittkamp 47'; Simonsen 61'	Report	Geyer 17'; Birkenmeier (yellow card) Novak (yellow card) Thiel (yellow card)	Attendance: 15,000; Referee: Jürgen Meßmer (Mannheim)

14 September 1974	Tennis Borussia Berlin	1–4	Eintracht Frankfurt	Mommsenstadion, Berlin
15:30	Stolzenburg 14'; Geyer (yellow card)	Report	Lorenz 19'; Weidle 26'; Rohrbach 47'; Beverungen 66'	Attendance: 12,700; Referee: Gerd Hennig (Duisburg)

21 September 1974	Tennis Borussia Berlin	0–3	Hamburger SV	Mommsenstadion, Berlin
19:30		Report	Volkert 5'; Eigl 53'; Krobbach 62'; Winkler (yellow card)	Attendance: 11,500; Referee: Alfons Betz (Regensburg)

27 September 1974	1. FC Kaiserslautern	4–0	Tennis Borussia Berlin	Fritz-Walter-Stadion, Kaiserslautern
20:00	Schwarz 43'; Riedl 54'; Sandberg 63'; Pirrung 73'; Kroth (yellow card)	Report	Geyer (yellow card) Mulack (yellow card) Schnellinger (yellow card); Thiel (red card) 32'	Attendance: 10,000; Referee: Rainer Waltert (Paderborn)

5 October 1974	Tennis Borussia Berlin	2–3	MSV Duisburg	Mommsenstadion, Berlin
15:30	Stolzenburg 28'; Schulz 67'	Report	Dietz 33', 82'; Büssers 87'; Schneider (yellow card) Bregman (yellow card)	Attendance: 4,700; Referee: Eberhard Schmoock (Reichenau)

9 October 1974	Rot-Weiss Essen	3–2	Tennis Borussia Berlin	Georg-Melches-Stadion, Essen
20:00	Dörre 24'; Lorant 56'; Lippens 64' (pen.); Dörre (yellow card)	Report	Geyer 74'; Stolzenburg 87'; Mulack (yellow card) Schnellinger (yellow card) Siegmann (yellow card)	Attendance: 12,000; Referee: Karl Riegg (Augsburg)

12 October 1974	Tennis Borussia Berlin	2–0	VfL Bochum	Mommsenstadion, Berlin
15:30	Sprenger 66'; Stolzenburg 90'; Mulack (yellow card)	Report	Eggert (yellow card)	Attendance: 6,500; Referee: Walter Horstmann (Hildesheim)

19 October 1974	Fortuna Düsseldorf	3–2	Tennis Borussia Berlin	Rheinstadion, Düsseldorf
15:30	Geye 2', 42' (pen.); Seel 27'; Geye (yellow card)	Report	Stolzenburg 72'; Sühnholz 77'; Jakobs (yellow card)	Attendance: 12,000; Referee: Hermann Schröder (Lahnstein)

2 November 1974	Tennis Borussia Berlin	2–2	FC Bayern Munich	Mommsenstadion, Berlin
15:30	Bittlmayer 35'; Eggert 87'	Report	Hoeneß 47'; Rummenigge 86'	Attendance: 14,800; Referee: Karl-Heinz Fork (Unna)

8 November 1974	Kickers Offenbach	3–2	Tennis Borussia Berlin	Stadion am Bieberer Berg, Offenbach
20:00	Schwemmle 1'; Held 2'; Janzon 24'; Ritschel (penalty missed)	Report	Jakobs 37'; Stolzenburg 48'; Schnellinger (yellow card) Schulz (yellow card)	Attendance: 15,000; Referee: Manfred Wichmann (Gelsenkirchen)

16 November 1974	Tennis Borussia Berlin	0–3	Hertha BSC	Olympiastadion, Berlin
15:30	Mulack (yellow card)	Report	Grau 53'; Beer 67', 75'; Grau (yellow card)	Attendance: 75,000; Referee: Paul Kindervater (Cologne)

23 November 1974	VfB Stuttgart	2–1	Tennis Borussia Berlin	Neckarstadion, Stuttgart
15:30	Martin 19'; Weller 80'; Jank (red card) 86'	Report	Jakobs 65'; Siegmann (yellow card)	Attendance: 13,000; Referee: Wolfgang Dittmer (Mutterstadt)

30 November 1974	Tennis Borussia Berlin	2–3	1. FC Köln	Mommsenstadion, Berlin
15:30	Stolzenburg 40' (pen.), 66'	Report	Strack 13'; Löhr 55', 60'; Simmet (yellow card)	Attendance: 5,500; Referee: Dieter Dreher (Darmstadt)

14 December 1974	Tennis Borussia Berlin	0–2	FC Schalke 04	Mommsenstadion, Berlin
15:30		Report	Bongartz 2'; Fischer 85'; Bongartz (yellow card)	Attendance: 3,900; Referee: Karl-Heinz Picker (Hamburg)

21 December 1974	Wuppertaler SV	2–0	Tennis Borussia Berlin	Stadion am Zoo, Wuppertal
15:30	Gerber 77', 83'	Report	Eggert (yellow card) Hoffmann (yellow card)	Attendance: 6,500; Referee: Heinz Aldinger (Waiblingen)

25 January 1975	Tennis Borussia Berlin	2–2	Eintracht Braunschweig	Mommsenstadion, Berlin
15:30	Rumor 22', 63'	Report	Gersdorff 16', 44'; Grzyb (yellow card)	Attendance: 6,200; Referee: Walter Eschweiler (Euskirchen)

1 February 1975	SV Werder Bremen	1–1	Tennis Borussia Berlin	Weserstadion, Bremen
15:30	Höttges 78' (pen.)	Report	Rumor 35'; Birkenmeier (yellow card) Rumor (yellow card)	Attendance: 14,000; Referee: Dieter Dreher (Darmstadt); Man of the Match: Karl-Heinz Schnellinger (TeBe)

15 February 1975	Tennis Borussia Berlin	1–4	Borussia Mönchengladbach	Mommsenstadion, Berlin
15:30	Stolzenburg 33'	Report	Heynckes 27', 50', 88'; Bonhof 68'	Attendance: 9,900; Referee: Walter Horstmann (Hildesheim); Man of the Match: Jupp Heynckes (M'gladbach)

22 February 1975	Eintracht Frankfurt	7–1	Tennis Borussia Berlin	Waldstadion, Frankfurt
15:30	Nickel 25', 41'; Beverungen 37'; Körbel 57', 81' (pen.); Grabowski 65'; Kraus 78'; Kraus (yellow card)	Report	Schulz 65'; Kraus (yellow card)	Attendance: 12,000; Referee: Rainer Waltert (Paderborn)

28 February 1975	Hamburger SV	4–0	Tennis Borussia Berlin	Volksparkstadion, Hamburg
20:00	Memering 7'; Bjørnmose 43'; Volkert 49'; Sperlich 57'; Winkler (yellow card)	Report	Rumor (yellow card) Siegmann (yellow card)	Attendance: 18,000; Referee: Wilfried Hilker (Bochum)

8 March 1975	Tennis Borussia Berlin	3–2	1. FC Kaiserslautern	Mommsenstadion, Berlin
15:30	Stolzenburg 53'; Subklewe 79'; Sprenger 83'	Report	Diehl 65'; Toppmöller 69'	Attendance: 3,100; Referee: Karl-Heinz Fork (Unna)

21 March 1975	MSV Duisburg	2–3	Tennis Borussia Berlin	Wedaustadion, Duisburg
20:00	Bücker 69'; Worm 80'	Report	Stolzenburg 43' (pen.); Rumor 44'; Geyer 84'	Attendance: 12,000; Referee: Günter Linn (Altendiez)

27 March 1975	Tennis Borussia Berlin	1–0	Rot-Weiss Essen	Mommsenstadion, Berlin
19:30	Stolzenburg 39'	Report	Erlhoff (yellow card) Lippens (yellow card) Lorant (yellow card) Senger (yellow card)	Attendance: 4,900; Referee: Dieter Berner (Enzberg)

1 April 1975	VfL Bochum	0–0	Tennis Borussia Berlin	Ruhrstadion, Bochum
20:00		Report		Attendance: 10,000; Referee: Max Klauser (Munich)

5 April 1975	Tennis Borussia Berlin	1–4	Fortuna Düsseldorf	Mommsenstadion, Berlin
15:30	Jakobs 77'; Jakobs (yellow card)	Report	Budde 10', 48'; Hesse 11'; Geye 28'; Baltes (yellow card)	Attendance: 5,700; Referee: Walter Engel (Reimsbach)

19 April 1975	FC Bayern Munich	3–1	Tennis Borussia Berlin	Olympiastadion, Munich
15:30	Müller 4', 18' (pen.); Andersson 8'	Report	Rumor 52'; Schulz (yellow card)	Attendance: 18,000; Referee: Wilfried Hilker (Bochum)

3 May 1975	Tennis Borussia Berlin	0–2	Kickers Offenbach	Mommsenstadion, Berlin
15:30	Rumor (yellow card)	Report	Ritschel 22'; Schwemmle 87'	Attendance: 3,251; Referee: Gert Meuser (Ingelheim)

10 May 1975	Hertha BSC	2–1	Tennis Borussia Berlin	Olympiastadion, Berlin
15:30	Sziedat 1'; Sidka 50'; Müller (yellow card)	Report	Rumor 39'; Jakobs (yellow card)	Attendance: 42,000; Referee: Hans Hillebrand (Essen)

24 May 1975	Tennis Borussia Berlin	1–1	VfB Stuttgart	Mommsenstadion, Berlin
15:30	Schwidrowski 66'	Report	Ohlicher 42'; Schäfer (yellow card)	Attendance: 2,200; Referee: Wilfried Hilker (Bochum)

31 May 1975	1. FC Köln	7–1	Tennis Borussia Berlin	Müngersdorfer Stadion, Cologne
15:30	Müller 40' (pen.), 75', 90' (pen.); Overath 43'; Flohe 61', 67'; Simmet 70'	Report	Bittlmayer 48'; Geyer (yellow card) Stolzenburg (yellow card) Thiel (yellow card)	Attendance: 7,500; Referee: Eberhard Schmoock (Reichenau)

7 June 1975	Tennis Borussia Berlin	0–0	Wuppertaler SV	Mommsenstadion, Berlin
15:30		Report	Dupke (yellow card)	Attendance: 1,500; Referee: Herbert Lutz (Bremen)

14 June 1975	FC Schalke 04	3–0	Tennis Borussia Berlin	Parkstadion, Gelsenkirchen
15:30	Fichtel 36' (pen.); Bruns 60'; Fischer 82'	Report	Kraus (yellow card) 36'	Attendance: 15,000; Referee: Hermann Schröder (Lahnstein); Man of the Match: Klaus Fichtel (FC Schalke 04)

=== DFB-Pokal ===
7 September 1974 R1	Rheydter SV	1–2	Tennis Borussia Berlin	Jahnstadion, Mönchengladbach
	Bäumer 14'	Report	Adler 24'; Geyer 46'; Sühnholz (yellow card)	Attendance: 4,000; Referee: Gerhard Boe (Uelzen)

25 October 1974 R2	Tennis Borussia Berlin	4–0	SC Rapide Wedding 1893	Mommsenstadion, Berlin
	Bittlmayer 28'; Stolzenburg 52' (pen.); Geyer 71', 82'	Report		Attendance: 1,100; Referee: Jürgen Zuchantke (Berlin)

8 February 1975 R3	Tennis Borussia Berlin	1–0	Alemannia Aachen	Mommsenstadion, Berlin
	Bläser 15' (o.g.)	Report	Bläser (yellow card)	Attendance: 2,200; Referee: Roth (Salzgitter)

15 March 1975 R4	VfB Stuttgart II	2–1	Tennis Borussia Berlin	Robert-Schlienz-Stadion, Stuttgart
	Müllner 49'; Haug 62'	Report	Schulz 25'	Attendance: 4,000; Referee: Dettmer (Ludwigshafen)

== Player statistics ==
Pos	Player	Apps	Goals	Apps	Goals	Apps	Goals
Pos	Player	Bundesliga		DFB-Pokal		Total	
MF	(West Germany) Reinhard Adler	10	0	1	1	11	1
GK	(West Germany) Hubert Birkenmeier	33	0	3	0	36	0
FW	(West Germany) Albert Bittlmayer	20	2	3	1	23	3
DF	(West Germany) Peter Eggert	11	1	1	0	12	1
MF	(West Germany) Gino Ferrin	6	0	1	0	7	0
FW	(West Germany) Peter Geyer	33	6	4	3	37	9
DF	(West Germany) Stephan Hoffmann	17	0	3	0	20	0
MF	(West Germany) Ditmar Jakobs	30	3	3	0	33	0
DF	(West Germany) Hans-Georg Kraus	17	0	0	0	17	0
DF	(West Germany) Wolfgang Mulack	22	0	2	0	24	0
DF	(West Germany) Werner Novak	4	0	1	0	5	0
DF	(West Germany) Jürgen Rumor	16	6	2	0	18	6
DF	(West Germany) Karl-Heinz Schnellinger	19	0	3	0	22	0
MF	(West Germany) Jürgen Schulz	33	2	4	1	37	3
MF	(West Germany) Gerd Schwidrowski	7	1	0	0	7	1
DF	(West Germany) Norbert Siegmann	28	0	4	0	32	0
FW	(West Germany) Hans Sprenger	32	2	3	0	35	2
FW	(West Germany) Norbert Stolzenburg	33	13	4	1	37	14
FW	(West Germany) Karlheinz Subklewe	20	1	1	0	21	1
FW	(West Germany) Wolfgang Sühnholz	8	1	2	0	10	1
DF	(West Germany) Joachim Thiel	22	0	3	0	25	0
GK	(West Germany) Manfred Wittke	2	0	1	0	3	0

== Final league table ==
Pos	Team	Pld	W	D	L	GF	GA	GD	Pts	Qualification or relegation
14	MSV Duisburg	34	12	6	16	59	77	−18	30	Qualification to UEFA Cup first round (Note: As Eintracht Frankfurt qualified for the Cup Winners' Cup, their UEFA Cup spot was transferred to DFB-Pokal runners-up MSV Duisburg.)
15	Werder Bremen	34	9	7	18	45	69	−24	25	
16	VfB Stuttgart (R)	34	8	8	18	50	79	−29	24	Relegation to 2. Bundesliga
17	Tennis Borussia Berlin (R)	34	5	6	23	38	89	−51	16	Relegation to 2. Bundesliga
18	Wuppertaler SV (R)	34	2	8	24	32	86	−54	12	Relegation to 2. Bundesliga

Source: www.dfb.de
Rules for classification: 1) points; 2) goal difference; 3) number of goals scored.
(R) Relegated
