= 1975–76 Tennis Borussia Berlin season =

Tennis Borussia Berlin
1975–76 season
- Manager: Helmuth Johannsen
- Stadium: Mommsenstadion
- 2. Bundesliga (Nord): 1st (champions; promoted)
- DFB-Pokal: Third Round
- Top goalscorer: League: Norbert Stolzenburg (27); All: Norbert Stolzenburg (27)
- Highest home attendance: 25,000 (vs. SC Wacker 04 Berlin)
- Lowest home attendance: 1,800 (vs. SpVgg Erkenschwick)
- Average home league attendance: 5,774

The 1975–76 season was the first time Tennis Borussia Berlin played in the 2. Bundesliga, the second highest tier of the German football league system. After 38 league games, Tennis Borussia finished top of the division and were promoted back to the Bundesliga after one season as league champions. The club reached the third round of the DFB-Pokal; losing 3–0 away to FC Bayern München. Norbert Stolzenburg scored 27 of the club's 86 league goals and in doing so, became the top scorer of the 1975–76 2. Bundesliga Nord.

== 1975–76 Tennis Borussia Berlin squad ==
No.	Pos.	Nation	Player
—	GK	FRG	Hubert Birkenmeier
—	GK	FRG	Manfred Wittke
—	DF	FRG	Peter Eggert
—	DF	FRG	Stephan Hoffmann
—	DF	FRG	Hans-Georg Kraus
—	DF	FRG	Werner Novak
—	DF	FRG	Norbert Siegmann
—	DF	FRG	Hans Sprenger
—	MF	FRG	Winfried Berkemeier
—	MF	FRG	Dirk Heun

No.	Pos.	Nation	Player
—	MF	FRG	Ditmar Jakobs
—	MF	FRG	Jürgen Schulz
—	MF	FRG	Gerd Schwidrowski
—	MF	FRG	Karlheinz Subklewe
—	MF	FRG	Michael Zimmer
—	FW	FRG	Albert Bittlmayer
—	FW	FRG	Peter Pagel
—	FW	FRG	Christian Sackewitz
—	FW	FRG	Norbert Stolzenburg

== 1975–76 fixtures ==
1 August 1975 DFB-Pokal – R1	Tennis Borussia Berlin	2–0	1. FC Schweinfurt 05	Mommsenstadion, Berlin
	Sackewitz 21', 78'; Eggert (yellow card) Jakobs (yellow card)	Report	Emmerich (yellow card)	Attendance: 3,000; Referee: Klaus Ohmsen (Hamburg)

9 August 1975 2. Bundesliga	1. SC Göttingen 05	3–0	Tennis Borussia Berlin	Jahnstadion, Göttingen
15:00	Wolf 4'; Gruler 29'; Hochheimer 63'	Report	Kraus (yellow card)	Attendance: 4,800; Referee: Eckhard Jensen (Kiel)

16 August 1975 2. Bundesliga	Tennis Borussia Berlin	2–1	Wuppertaler SV	Mommsenstadion, Berlin
15:00	Siegmann 49'; Stolzenburg 50'; Kraus (yellow card) Stolzenburg (yellow card)	Report	Pröpper 9'; Jung (yellow card)	Attendance: 3,300; Referee: Jan Redelfs

20 August 1975 2. Bundesliga	1. FC Mülheim	0–2	Tennis Borussia Berlin	Städtische Sportanlage Moritzstraße, Mülheim
19:30	Greiffendorf (yellow card)	Report	Stolzenburg 36'; Bittlmayer 71'	Attendance: 4,400; Referee: Paul Kindervater (Cologne)

23 August 1975 2. Bundesliga	Tennis Borussia Berlin	6–0	Alemannia Aachen	Mommsenstadion, Berlin
15:00	Stolzenburg 9', 13', 86'; Bittlmayer 55', 63', 88'; Sackewitz (yellow card)	Report	Mertes (yellow card)	Attendance: 3,800; Referee: Dieter Gabriel (Springe)

30 August 1975 2. Bundesliga	Borussia Dortmund	4–0	Tennis Borussia Berlin	Westfalenstadion, Dortmund
15:00	Schildt 2'; Kasperski 4'; Wagner 18'; Geyer 65'	Report	Siegmann (yellow card) Sprenger (yellow card)	Attendance: 26,000; Referee: Herbert Lutz (Bremen)

6 September 1975 2. Bundesliga	Tennis Borussia Berlin	2–1	SG Wattenscheid 09	Mommsenstadion, Berlin
15:00	Berkemeier 5'; Stolzenburg 25'; Stolzenburg (yellow card)	Report	Babington 88'; Babington (yellow card) Hippler (yellow card)	Attendance: 4,300; Referee: Wilfried Heitmann (Drentwede)

13 September 1975 2. Bundesliga	DJK Gütersloh	2–4	Tennis Borussia Berlin	Heidewaldstadion, Gütersloh
15:00	Rummenigge 14', 58'; Riediger (yellow card)	Report	Stolzenburg 2', 25'; Bittlmayer 31'; Subklewe 85'; Sprenger (yellow card)	Attendance: 3,500; Referee: Dieter Gathmann (Wattenscheid)

20 September 1975 2. Bundesliga	Tennis Borussia Berlin	3–2	SC Fortuna Köln	Mommsenstadion, Berlin
15:00	Jakobs 58'; Berkemeier 80'; Stolzenburg 84'	Report	Struth 31' (pen.); Wesseler 85'; Wesseler (yellow card)	Attendance: 7,500; Referee: Walter Horstmann (Hildesheim)

27 September 1975 2. Bundesliga	SpVgg Erkenschwick	1–1	Tennis Borussia Berlin	Stimbergstadion, Oer-Erkenschwick
15:00	Schramm 73'	Report	Jakobs 29'	Attendance: 3,100; Referee: Bernhard Holste (Mülheim)

4 October 1975 2. Bundesliga	Tennis Borussia Berlin	3–2	Spandauer SV	Mommsenstadion, Berlin
15:00	Eggert 65'; Subklewe 76'; Jakobs 80'; Kraus (yellow card)	Report	Ressel 17'; Bremekamp 47'; Schubert (yellow card) Kuschke (yellow card)	Attendance: 4,000; Referee: Norbert Brückner (Berlin)

12 October 1975 2. Bundesliga	SC Wacker 04 Berlin	2–1	Tennis Borussia Berlin	Wackerplatz, Berlin
15:30	John 43' (pen.), 62'	Report	Berkemeier 40'; Subklewe (yellow card)	Attendance: 6,000; Referee: Peter Meijerink (Berlin)

18 October 1975 DFB-Pokal – R2	Sportfreunde Siegen	1–2	Tennis Borussia Berlin	Leimbachstadion, Siegen
	Otterbach 62'; Göbel (yellow card)	Report	Bittlmayer 35'; Berkemeier 48'; Siegmann (yellow card)	Attendance: 2,400; Referee: Horst Hellwig (Sandershausen)

25 October 1975 2. Bundesliga	SG Union Solingen	1–0	Tennis Borussia Berlin	Stadion am Hermann-Löns-Weg, Solingen
15:00	Kuballa 26'; Kuballa (yellow card) Lehr (yellow card)	Report	Subklewe (yellow card)	Attendance: 6,000; Referee: Dieter Stäglich (Bonn)

1 November 1975 2. Bundesliga	Tennis Borussia Berlin	3–0	SC Preußen Münster	Mommsenstadion, Berlin
15:00	Bittlmayer 30'; Jakobs 69', 81'; Kraus (yellow card) Subklewe (yellow card)	Report	Pleyer (yellow card) Jank (yellow card)	Attendance: 2,200; Referee: Joachim Schoen (Mulmshorn)

8 November 1975 2. Bundesliga	FC St. Pauli	1–2	Tennis Borussia Berlin	Millerntor-Stadion, Hamburg
15:00	Höfert 40'; Kampf (yellow card) Höfert (yellow card) Neumann (yellow card)	Report	Stolzenburg 36'; Kraus 60'; Subklewe (yellow card)	Attendance: 2,900; Referee: Gerhard Boe (Uelzen)

15 November 1975 2. Bundesliga	Tennis Borussia Berlin	4–1	Bayer 04 Leverkusen	Mommsenstadion, Berlin
15:00	Schulz 37'; Stolzenburg 61'; Berkemeier 67'; Jakobs 80'	Report	Rehbach 57'; Kentschke (yellow card)	Attendance: 2,600; Referee: Herbert Lutz (Bremen)

22 November 1975 2. Bundesliga	Schwarz-Weiß Essen	2–2	Tennis Borussia Berlin	Uhlenkrugstadion, Essen
15:00	Leufgen 57'; Bals 66'	Report	Bittlmayer 74'; Eggert 87'; Bittlmayer (yellow card)	Attendance: 6,000; Referee: Brammler

29 November 1975 2. Bundesliga	Tennis Borussia Berlin	3–1	SC Westfalia Herne	Mommsenstadion, Berlin
15:00	Berkemeier 42'; Stolzenburg 65'; Sprenger 73'; Siegmann (yellow card)	Report	Konrad 48'; Girrbach (yellow card) Abel (yellow card)	Attendance: 2,600; Referee: Hans-Werner Leyding

6 December 1975 2. Bundesliga	Arminia Bielefeld	0–2	Tennis Borussia Berlin	Stadion Alm, Bielefeld
15:00		Report	Stolzenburg 38'; Bittlmayer 58'	Attendance: 12,000; Referee: Jan Redelfs

13 December 1975 DFB-Pokal – R3	FC Bayern München	3–0	Tennis Borussia Berlin	Olympiastadion, Munich
	Torstensson 16'; Müller 60'; Rummenigge 82'	Report		Attendance: 12,000; Referee: Roth (Salzgitter)

21 December 1975 2. Bundesliga	Tennis Borussia Berlin	0–0	VfL Osnabrück	Mommsenstadion, Berlin
15:00		Report	Baumanns (yellow card) Nordmann (yellow card)	Attendance: 4,900; Referee: Karl-Heinz Fork (Unna)

17 January 1976 2. Bundesliga	Tennis Borussia Berlin	4–0	1. SC Göttingen 05	Mommsenstadion, Berlin
15:00	Jakobs 40'; Bittlmayer 51'; Stolzenburg 58'; Siegmann 68'	Report	Mensink (yellow card)	Attendance: 2,900; Referee: Paul Kindervater (Cologne)

24 January 1976 2. Bundesliga	Wuppertaler SV	1–4	Tennis Borussia Berlin	Stadion am Zoo, Wuppertal
15:00	Gerber 67'	Report	Bittlmayer 16', 52'; Stolzenburg 77', 79'	Attendance: 6,000; Referee: Dietrich Basedow (Hamburg)

7 February 1976 2. Bundesliga	Tennis Borussia Berlin	5–0	1. FC Mülheim	Mommsenstadion, Berlin
15:00	Berkemeier 27'; Schulz 50'; Heun 62'; Subklewe 83'; Bittlmayer 90'	Report		Attendance: 2,300; Referee: Walter Niemann (Hamburg)

14 February 1976 2. Bundesliga	Alemannia Aachen	1–0	Tennis Borussia Berlin	Tivoli, Aachen
15:00	Reuter 82'	Report	Siegmann (yellow card) Heun (yellow card)	Attendance: 3,500; Referee: Winfried Hanschke (Burgsdorf)

21 February 1976 2. Bundesliga	Tennis Borussia Berlin	1–3	Borussia Dortmund	Mommsenstadion, Berlin
15:00	Stolzenburg 10'	Report	Nerlinger 49'; Wolf 73'; Geyer 87'	Attendance: 17,000; Referee: Volker Roth

6 March 1976 2. Bundesliga	SG Wattenscheid 09	1–2	Tennis Borussia Berlin	Lohrheidestadion, Bochum–Wattenscheid
15:00	Grede 62'; Babington (yellow card) Hammes (yellow card)	Report	Stolzenburg 8'; Bittlmayer 47'; Subklewe (yellow card)	Attendance: 4,000; Referee: Eckhard Jensen (Kiel)

13 March 1976 2. Bundesliga	Tennis Borussia Berlin	0–1	DJK Gütersloh	Mommsenstadion, Berlin
15:00		Report	Roggensack 38'; Angele (yellow card)	Attendance: 2,500; Referee: Gerhard Boe (Uelzen)

20 March 1976 2. Bundesliga	SC Fortuna Köln	6–1	Tennis Borussia Berlin	Müngersdorfer Stadion, Cologne
15:00	Müller 16'; Mödrath 56', 59', 62'; Dohmen 68'; Hattenberger 70'; Hattenberger (yellow card)	Report	Berkemeier 2'; Eggert (yellow card)	Attendance: 10,600; Referee: Wilfried Hilker (Bochum)

27 March 1976 2. Bundesliga	Tennis Borussia Berlin	1–0	SpVgg Erkenschwick	Mommsenstadion, Berlin
15:00	Stolzenburg 51'	Report	Horsthemke (yellow card) Petek (yellow card)	Attendance: 1,800; Referee: Karl-Heinz Picker (Hamburg)

11 April 1976 2. Bundesliga	Spandauer SV	0–5	Tennis Borussia Berlin	Stadion in der Neuendorfer Straße, Berlin
15:00	Suchanek (yellow card) Zippel (yellow card)	Report	Bittlmayer 15'; Subklewe 30', 84'; Stolzenburg 32'; Schulz 82'; Stolzenburg (yellow card)	Attendance: 6,200; Referee: Peter Meijerink (Berlin)

16 April 1976 2. Bundesliga	Tennis Borussia Berlin	4–0	SG Union Solingen	Mommsenstadion, Berlin
15:00	Schulz 62'; Jakobs 70'; Sprenger 85'; Stolzenburg 86'; Kraus (yellow card)	Report	Schmitz (yellow card) Evenkamp (yellow card)	Attendance: 4,800; Referee: Kurt-Dieter Roth

1 May 1976 2. Bundesliga	SC Preußen Münster	0–0	Tennis Borussia Berlin	Preußenstadion, Münster
15:00	Grünther (yellow card)	Report	Sprenger (yellow card) Subklewe (yellow card)	Attendance: 18,000; Referee: Klaus Ohmsen (Hamburg)

8 May 1976 2. Bundesliga	Tennis Borussia Berlin	3–0	FC St. Pauli	Mommsenstadion, Berlin
15:00	Sprenger 44'; Jakobs 71'; Zimmer 82'	Report	John (yellow card) Ferrin (yellow card); Höfert (red card) 81'	Attendance: 4,700; Referee: Walter Eschweiler (Euskirchen)

16 May 1976 2. Bundesliga	Bayer 04 Leverkusen	0–2	Tennis Borussia Berlin	Ulrich-Haberland-Stadion, Leverkusen
15:00	Kentschke (yellow card)	Report	Stolzenburg 8'; Berkemeier 78'; Berkemeier (yellow card)	Attendance: 5,000; Referee: Wolfgang Gremmler (Braunschweig)

22 May 1976 2. Bundesliga	Tennis Borussia Berlin	4–1	Schwarz-Weiß Essen	Mommsenstadion, Berlin
15:00	Sprenger 18', 61'; Jakobs 51'; Berkemeier 66'	Report	Bals 59'	Attendance: 5,500; Referee: Walter Horstmann (Hildesheim)

26 May 1976 2. Bundesliga	SC Westfalia Herne	3–2	Tennis Borussia Berlin	Stadion am Schloss Strünkede, Herne
19:30	Ochmann 1'; Kacmierczak 11'; Deus 43'	Report	Jakobs 57', 77'; Siegmann (yellow card)	Attendance: 6,000; Referee: Wolfgang Richter (Kürten)

29 May 1976 2. Bundesliga	Tennis Borussia Berlin	2–0	Arminia Bielefeld	Mommsenstadion, Berlin
15:00	Siegmann 6'; Stolzenburg 23'	Report	Peitsch (yellow card) Mittendorf (yellow card)	Attendance: 8,000; Referee: Eckhard Jensen (Kiel)

5 June 1976 2. Bundesliga	VfL Osnabrück	1–2	Tennis Borussia Berlin	Stadion an der Bremer Brücke, Osnabrück
15:00	Greif 79'	Report	Stolzenburg 67', 76'; Eggert (yellow card)	Attendance: 5,000; Referee: Gerd Hennig (Duisburg)

12 June 1976 2. Bundesliga	Tennis Borussia Berlin	4–1	SC Wacker 04 Berlin	Olympiastadion, Berlin
15:00	Stolzenburg 54', 68'; Schulz 63'; Siegmann 85'	Report	Lunenburg 75'; Lunenburg (yellow card)	Attendance: 25,000; Referee: Jürgen Zuchantke (Berlin)

== Player statistics ==
Pos	Player	Apps	Goals	Apps	Goals	Apps	Goals
Pos	Player	2. Bundesliga		DFB-Pokal		Total	
MF	(West Germany) Winfried Berkemeier	37	9	3	1	40	10
GK	(West Germany) Hubert Birkenmeier	35	0	2	0	37	0
FW	(West Germany) Albert Bittlmayer	29	14	3	1	32	15
DF	(West Germany) Peter Eggert	37	2	3	0	40	2
MF	(West Germany) Dirk Heun	15	1	1	0	16	1
DF	(West Germany) Stephan Hoffmann	1	0	0	0	1	0
MF	(West Germany) Ditmar Jakobs	38	12	3	0	41	12
DF	(West Germany) Hans-Georg Kraus	32	1	3	0	35	1
DF	(West Germany) Werner Novak	6	0	0	0	6	0
FW	(West Germany) Peter Pagel	1	0	0	0	1	0
FW	(West Germany) Christian Sackewitz	15	0	1	2	16	2
MF	(West Germany) Jürgen Schulz	38	5	3	0	41	5
MF	(West Germany) Gerd Schwidrowski	2	0	0	0	2	0
DF	(West Germany) Norbert Siegmann	37	4	3	0	40	4
DF	(West Germany) Hans Sprenger	36	5	3	0	39	5
FW	(West Germany) Norbert Stolzenburg	38	27	3	0	41	27
MF	(West Germany) Karlheinz Subklewe	35	5	2	0	37	5
GK	(West Germany) Manfred Wittke	5	0	1	0	6	0
MF	(West Germany) Michael Zimmer	9	1	1	0	10	0

== Final league table ==
2. Bundesliga
- Season: 1975–76
- Champions: Nord: Tennis Borussia Berlin; Süd: 1. FC Saarbrücken
- Promoted: Nord: Tennis Borussia Berlin; Borussia Dortmund; Süd: 1. FC Saarbrücken
- Relegated: Nord: 1. FC Mülheim; SpVgg Erkenschwick; DJK Gütersloh; Spandauer SV; Süd: 1. FSV Mainz 05; FC Schweinfurt 05; Eintracht Bad Kreuznach; SSV Reutlingen
- Matches: Nord: 380; Süd: 380
- Top goalscorer: Nord: Norbert Stolzenburg (27 goals); Süd: Karl-Heinz Granitza (29 goals)
- Average attendance: Nord: 6,396; Süd: 7,258

The 1975–76 2. Bundesliga season was the second season of the 2. Bundesliga, the second tier of the German football league system. It was played in two regional divisions, Nord and Süd.

Tennis Borussia Berlin, Borussia Dortmund and 1. FC Saarbrücken were promoted to the Bundesliga while 1. FC Mülheim, SpVgg Erkenschwick, DJK Gütersloh, Spandauer SV, 1. FSV Mainz 05, FC Schweinfurt 05, Eintracht Bad Kreuznach and SSV Reutlingen were relegated to the Oberligas and Amateurligas.

== Nord ==
For the 1975–76 season saw Bayer Leverkusen, Spandauer SV, Westfalia Herne and Union Solingen promoted to the 2. Bundesliga from the Oberliga and Amateurligas while Wuppertaler SV and Tennis Borussia Berlin had been relegated to the 2. Bundesliga Nord from the Bundesliga.

=== League table ===
Pos	Team	Pld	W	D	L	GF	GA	GD	Pts	Promotion, qualification or relegation
1	Tennis Borussia Berlin (C, P)	38	25	4	9	86	43	+43	54	Promotion to Bundesliga
2	Borussia Dortmund (P)	38	22	8	8	93	37	+56	52	Qualification for promotion play-offs
3	Preußen Münster	38	20	9	9	65	42	+23	49	
4	Fortuna Köln	38	19	7	12	74	49	+25	45	
5	Wuppertaler SV	38	18	9	11	76	53	+23	45	
6	VfL Osnabrück	38	19	7	12	61	47	+14	45	
7	Schwarz-Weiss Essen	38	19	6	13	63	52	+11	44	
8	SG Wattenscheid 09	38	17	9	12	71	58	+13	43	
9	Arminia Bielefeld	38	14	14	10	49	46	+3	42	
10	Westfalia Herne	38	16	8	14	60	57	+3	40	
11	1. SC Göttingen 05	38	15	7	16	63	54	+9	37	
12	Alemannia Aachen	38	12	12	14	45	53	−8	36	
13	SG Union Solingen	38	11	14	13	45	56	−11	36	
14	FC St. Pauli	38	13	8	17	70	82	−12	34	
15	Bayer Leverkusen	38	12	8	18	46	61	−15	32	
16	Wacker 04 Berlin	38	11	9	18	51	82	−31	31	
17	1. FC Mülheim (R)	38	10	10	18	54	76	−22	30	Relegation to Oberliga
18	SpVgg Erkenschwick (R)	38	10	9	19	45	69	−24	29	Relegation to Oberliga
19	DJK Gütersloh (R)	38	12	4	22	52	70	−18	28	Relegation to Oberliga
20	Spandauer SV (R)	38	2	4	32	33	115	−82	8	Relegation to Oberliga

Source: Bundesliga.de
Rules for classification: 1) points; 2) goal difference; 3) number of goals scored.
(C) Champions; (P) Promoted; (R) Relegated

=== Results ===
Home \ Away	AAC	TBB	W04	DSC	BVB	ERK	SWE	G05	DJK	SCW	FKO	B04	FMU	PRM	OSN	SGU	SSV	STP	SGW	WSV
Alemannia Aachen	—	1–0	1–1	0–0	1–2	1–1	2–1	4–1	2–1	5–0	0–0	2–1	2–1	1–2	2–1	2–1	1–1	2–2	3–0	1–1
Tennis Borussia Berlin	6–0	—	4–1	2–0	1–3	1–0	4–1	4–0	0–1	3–1	3–2	4–1	5–0	3–0	0–0	4–0	3–2	3–0	2–1	2–1
Wacker 04 Berlin	2–0	2–1	—	2–1	2–1	2–0	4–3	0–1	2–1	3–2	1–7	0–3	4–3	1–1	1–0	0–0	1–1	1–4	0–3	1–2
Arminia Bielefeld	1–0	0–2	1–1	—	1–1	3–1	1–2	2–1	2–0	2–4	1–1	2–0	2–1	2–2	1–0	0–0	1–0	1–0	2–2	3–1
Borussia Dortmund	3–0	4–0	6–0	2–2	—	6–0	3–0	3–0	2–1	4–0	0–0	7–0	6–0	1–0	2–2	0–0	3–0	6–2	4–1	2–1
SpVgg Erkenschwick	2–0	1–1	2–2	1–1	1–4	—	0–1	2–1	3–1	0–4	2–1	4–0	3–2	2–0	1–1	4–3	5–1	1–3	2–3	0–1
Schwarz-Weiß Essen	2–0	2–2	3–1	2–2	1–0	3–1	—	1–1	2–0	4–1	1–1	2–1	4–1	0–2	2–0	2–0	3–1	4–0	3–1	2–2
Göttingen 05	2–0	3–0	2–0	2–0	3–0	4–1	1–2	—	2–1	3–1	1–1	2–0	0–1	1–3	1–2	2–2	4–1	1–2	0–2	1–3
DJK Gütersloh	2–1	2–4	1–0	0–2	0–2	4–0	0–2	1–0	—	1–2	3–2	3–1	1–1	0–1	4–2	3–1	4–0	4–4	1–2	0–5
Westfalia Herne	2–0	3–2	3–3	0–0	2–1	0–0	2–0	2–2	0–1	—	0–2	2–1	6–1	2–1	2–0	2–1	2–0	1–1	1–2	4–2
Fortuna Köln	1–1	6–1	2–1	1–2	3–1	1–0	3–2	3–4	2–0	3–1	—	3–0	2–0	1–0	3–0	2–0	4–2	2–1	5–4	0–4
Bayer Leverkusen	0–1	0–2	1–1	0–0	0–2	2–0	0–1	2–1	3–2	2–1	0–0	—	3–0	6–1	1–1	2–0	2–1	2–3	2–1	1–1
1. FC Mülheim	0–0	0–2	2–0	5–1	1–1	1–1	3–1	0–4	2–1	0–0	1–0	2–2	—	1–1	1–3	5–1	6–1	4–3	1–2	0–0
Preußen Münster	4–0	0–0	4–2	1–1	4–1	2–0	2–0	1–0	2–2	0–0	2–1	1–2	3–1	—	2–0	2–1	7–0	2–2	2–1	1–1
VfL Osnabrück	1–0	1–2	4–2	2–0	3–2	3–0	2–0	2–2	3–1	1–0	1–0	1–0	3–0	3–2	—	1–1	3–1	3–0	1–0	4–0
Union Solingen	1–1	1–0	2–1	2–0	1–1	0–0	1–0	1–1	0–1	1–1	2–1	1–1	1–0	1–0	1–1	—	2–1	1–4	2–2	2–1
Spandauer SV	1–4	0–5	2–3	1–3	1–2	0–2	0–1	0–4	1–1	0–2	1–3	1–0	4–5	1–2	1–0	2–7	—	1–5	1–1	1–4
FC St. Pauli	1–1	1–2	5–2	2–1	1–1	2–1	2–1	0–3	2–1	1–3	2–1	1–1	1–1	0–2	2–3	1–2	5–1	—	3–5	2–4
SG Wattenscheid	3–1	1–2	0–0	1–1	2–1	1–1	3–0	1–1	4–1	2–0	4–3	2–3	1–0	1–2	3–1	2–2	3–0	2–0	—	2–2
Wuppertaler SV	2–2	1–4	3–1	1–4	0–3	3–0	2–2	3–1	4–1	2–1	0–1	2–0	1–1	0–1	4–2	3–0	2–0	5–0	2–0	—

Source: DFB
Legend: Blue = home team win; Yellow = draw; Red = away team win.

=== Top scorers ===
The league's top scorers:

Goals	Player	Team
27	(Germany) Norbert Stolzenburg	Tennis Borussia Berlin
22	(Germany) Hans Fritsche	Schwarz-Weiß Essen
19	(Germany) Franz Gerber	Wuppertaler SV
18	(Germany) Hans-Werner Hartl	Borussia Dortmund
18	(Germany) Herbert Mühlenberg	VfL Osnabrück
17	(Germany) Hans-Joachim Abel	Westfalia Herne
17	(Germany) Otmar Ludwig	Fortuna Köln
15	(Germany) Wolfgang John	Wacker 04 Berlin/FC St. Pauli
15	(Germany) Gerd Kasperski	Borussia Dortmund
15	(Germany) Horst Neumann	FC St. Pauli

== Süd ==
For the 1975–76 season saw Eintracht Kreuznach, FSV Frankfurt, Jahn Regensburg and SSV Reutlingen promoted to the 2. Bundesliga from the Amateurligas and VfB Stuttgart relegated to the 2. Bundesliga Süd from the Bundesliga.

=== League table ===
Pos	Team	Pld	W	D	L	GF	GA	GD	Pts	Promotion, qualification or relegation
1	1. FC Saarbrücken (C, P)	38	23	11	4	66	28	+38	57	Promotion to Bundesliga
2	1. FC Nürnberg	38	24	6	8	78	42	+36	54	Qualification for promotion play-offs
3	FC Homburg	38	19	13	6	72	41	+31	51	
4	1860 Munich	38	19	9	10	78	55	+23	47	
5	SpVgg Bayreuth	38	18	11	9	71	55	+16	47	
6	Röchling Völklingen	38	18	9	11	72	65	+7	45	
7	Darmstadt 98	38	19	5	14	76	64	+12	43	
8	Waldhof Mannheim	38	16	10	12	64	55	+9	42	
9	Bayern Hof	38	18	5	15	60	56	+4	41	
10	SpVgg Fürth	38	17	3	18	64	52	+12	37	
11	VfB Stuttgart	38	16	4	18	67	60	+7	36	
12	Mainz 05 (Note: 1. FSV Mainz 05 voluntarily returned their license for the following season to the DFB and were therefore relegated.) (R)	38	12	12	14	81	92	−11	36	Relegation to Oberliga
13	FSV Frankfurt	38	15	5	18	49	63	−14	35	
14	FK Pirmasens	38	13	7	18	66	78	−12	33	
15	FC Augsburg	38	12	8	18	57	56	+1	32	
16	Stuttgarter Kickers	38	13	6	19	57	70	−13	32	
17	Jahn Regensburg	38	8	14	16	48	74	−26	30	
18	FC Schweinfurt 05 (R)	38	9	8	21	50	72	−22	26	Relegation to Oberliga
19	Eintracht Bad Kreuznach (R)	38	8	7	23	49	83	−34	23	Relegation to Oberliga
20	SSV Reutlingen (R)	38	5	3	30	35	99	−64	13	Relegation to Oberliga

Source: Bundesliga.de
Rules for classification: 1) points; 2) goal difference; 3) number of goals scored.
(C) Champions; (P) Promoted; (R) Relegated

=== Results ===
Home \ Away	FCA	EBK	BAY	D98	FSV	FUE	HOF	HOM	M05	M60	FCN	FKP	JRE	R05	FCS	S05	SKI	VFB	SVR	CWA
FC Augsburg	—	3–1	3–4	4–0	2–1	2–3	1–0	1–1	1–1	1–1	0–1	1–2	3–0	1–2	1–2	1–3	4–0	3–1	2–0	0–1
Eintracht Bad Kreuznach	1–0	—	1–2	1–2	0–1	0–0	1–2	0–0	3–1	1–2	1–3	6–3	2–2	6–1	0–2	1–1	0–1	1–2	2–0	6–4
SpVgg Bayreuth	2–0	1–1	—	0–2	4–1	2–1	2–1	0–0	1–1	4–2	3–4	3–0	4–0	3–2	0–0	3–0	3–2	1–0	3–1	2–2
Darmstadt 98	4–1	4–1	0–0	—	1–2	1–3	1–1	0–2	3–1	5–3	2–0	2–1	0–1	4–1	2–0	6–2	4–0	2–3	3–1	4–1
FSV Frankfurt	1–0	1–2	2–1	1–2	—	4–0	2–0	1–0	7–1	3–2	2–1	1–1	1–1	1–0	0–2	2–1	2–1	1–7	0–1	3–2
SpVgg Fürth	2–0	4–0	2–1	0–1	2–0	—	3–0	0–3	4–2	0–2	2–3	4–1	2–0	0–0	2–3	3–0	3–0	3–0	3–0	1–1
Bayern Hof	2–2	2–0	2–1	3–0	1–0	1–0	—	3–2	4–3	0–2	1–1	1–1	1–1	4–2	3–4	2–0	1–2	3–4	1–0	0–1
FC Homburg	1–0	4–0	1–1	2–3	2–1	3–1	3–0	—	7–1	3–0	1–0	3–2	3–3	2–0	1–1	1–0	2–2	1–0	2–1	2–2
Mainz 05	1–3	3–1	2–2	5–2	6–1	1–5	0–1	2–2	—	3–3	3–7	1–0	3–3	4–2	0–0	2–1	1–1	4–2	4–2	2–2
1860 Munich	4–2	3–0	3–0	2–1	3–2	1–0	1–3	2–2	1–3	—	1–0	3–0	3–1	6–0	1–1	3–1	5–0	3–0	1–2	2–1
1. FC Nürnberg	2–1	4–0	2–1	1–0	0–0	3–2	5–1	2–2	3–1	2–0	—	5–4	4–1	3–0	0–0	1–0	5–0	1–0	2–2	0–2
FK Pirmasens	0–0	6–0	0–2	1–1	1–0	1–0	2–0	3–2	3–3	4–1	0–3	—	2–1	2–1	0–2	5–4	1–0	0–2	6–2	1–2
Jahn Regensburg	2–0	2–1	4–2	3–3	1–1	1–2	0–3	2–2	3–3	0–2	0–3	0–0	—	2–1	0–1	1–0	3–1	1–1	1–1	0–2
SSV Reutlingen	0–2	1–3	1–3	2–6	0–1	1–0	1–4	0–2	2–2	1–4	0–1	3–4	2–4	—	0–1	0–2	2–1	0–4	1–3	1–1
1. FC Saarbrücken	2–0	3–0	5–1	3–0	3–0	4–1	2–1	3–0	2–1	2–2	1–0	2–1	2–2	2–1	—	0–0	1–0	4–0	1–1	3–1
1. FC Schweinfurt	3–3	2–2	2–2	2–1	3–0	2–0	1–2	1–3	1–0	0–0	0–2	2–2	2–0	0–1	3–2	—	2–1	2–3	3–4	1–1
Stuttgarter Kickers	1–1	3–3	0–1	6–0	0–0	1–4	2–1	0–1	5–2	4–1	1–1	3–1	2–0	3–0	2–0	4–2	—	2–0	1–2	4–1
VfB Stuttgart	0–1	4–1	1–1	2–3	3–1	2–0	0–1	0–2	0–2	1–1	0–1	5–3	3–0	2–3	1–0	2–0	5–0	—	2–2	2–0
Röchling Völklingen	4–4	1–0	3–3	2–1	3–2	2–1	1–3	2–1	2–4	0–0	4–2	2–1	1–1	4–0	0–0	3–0	3–0	5–3	—	1–0
SV Chio Waldhof	0–3	3–0	1–2	0–0	3–0	3–1	2–1	1–1	0–2	2–2	3–0	5–1	5–1	2–0	0–0	3–1	2–1	1–0	1–4	—

Source: DFB
Legend: Blue = home team win; Yellow = draw; Red = away team win.

=== Top scorers ===
The league's top scorers:

Goals	Player	Team
29	(Germany) Karl-Heinz Granitza	Röchling Völklingen
23	(Germany) Werner Hofmann	SpVgg Fürth
23	(Germany) Ferdinand Keller	TSV 1860 Munich
21	(Germany) Lothar Emmerich	FC Schweinfurt 05
21	(Germany) Dieter Nüssing	1. FC Nürnberg
21	(Germany) Hans Walitza	1. FC Nürnberg
20	(Germany) Hartmut Werner	FC Bayern Hof
19	(Germany) Manfred Lenz	FC 08 Homburg
18	(Germany) Harald Diener	FC 08 Homburg
18	(Germany) Günter Sebert	SV Waldhof Mannheim

== Promotion play-offs ==
The final place in the Bundesliga was contested between the two runners-up in the Nord and Süd divisions. Borussia Dortmund won on aggregate and were promoted to the Bundesliga.

Team 1	Agg.	Team 2	1st leg	2nd leg
1. FC Nürnberg (S)	2–4	Borussia Dortmund (N)	0–1	2–3
