= 1981–82 1. FC Kaiserslautern season =

1. FC Kaiserslautern
1981-82 season
- Manager: Karl-Heinz Feldkamp
- Stadium: Stadion Betzenberg
- Bundesliga: 4th
- DFB-Pokal: First round
- UEFA Cup: Semi-finals
- Top goalscorer: League: Hans-Peter Briegel (13 goals); All: Hans-Peter Briegel (17 goals)

1. FC Kaiserslautern had a strong season in the Bundesliga, finishing in fourth place with 42 points. They crashed in the first round of the DFB-Pokal to Werder Bremen, losing 1-0.

Kaiserslautern had one of its finest ever European campaigns, reaching the semi-finals of the UEFA Cup, defeating PFC Akademik Sofia, Spartak Moscow and Lokeren. In the quarter-finals, they faced off against European giants Real Madrid, losing 3-1 at the Santiago Bernabéu in the first leg, but made a miraculous comeback at home by defeating the Spaniards by 5-0. In the semi-finals, they faced off against eventual UEFA Cup winners IFK Göteborg, drawing with the Swedes at the Stadion Betzenberg by 1-1, and at Gothenburg, they lost 2-1 by conceding a penalty in the 102th minute.

== Squad ==
Note: Flags indicate national team as defined under FIFA eligibility rules; some limited exceptions apply. Players may hold more than one non-FIFA nationality.

No.	Pos.	Nation	Player
—	GK	SWE	Ronnie Hellström
—	GK	GER	Thomas Henrichs
—	GK	GER	Armin Reichel
—	DF	GER	Andreas Brehme
—	DF	GER	Hans-Peter Briegel
—	DF	GER	Michael Dusek
—	DF	GER	Werner Merzel
—	DF	GER	Hans-Günter Neues
—	DF	GER	Manfred Plath
—	DF	GER	Wolfgang Wolf

No.	Pos.	Nation	Player
—	MF	GER	Hannes Bongartz
—	MF	GER	Lutz Eigendorf
—	MF	GER	Norbert Eilenfeldt
—	MF	GER	Michael Schuhmacher
—	FW	GER	Axel Brummer
—	FW	GER	Friedhelm Funkel
—	FW	GER	Reiner Geye
—	FW	GER	Erhard Hofeditz
—	FW	GER	Bruno Hübner
—	FW	GER	Dieter Kitzmann

== Competitions ==
=== Bundesliga ===
==== League table ====
Pos	Team	Pld	W	D	L	GF	GA	GD	Pts	Qualification or relegation
2	1. FC Köln	34	18	9	7	72	38	+34	45	Qualification to UEFA Cup first round (Note: As Bayern Munich qualified for the Cup Winners' Cup, their UEFA Cup spot was transferred to Borussia Dortmund.)
3	Bayern Munich	34	20	3	11	77	56	+21	43	Qualification to Cup Winners' Cup first round
4	1. FC Kaiserslautern	34	16	10	8	70	61	+9	42	Qualification to UEFA Cup first round
5	Werder Bremen	34	17	8	9	61	52	+9	42	Qualification to UEFA Cup first round
6	Borussia Dortmund	34	18	5	11	59	40	+19	41	Qualification to UEFA Cup first round

Source: www.dfb.de
Rules for classification: 1) points; 2) goal difference; 3) number of goals scored.

==== Matches ====
8 August 1981 1	Eintracht Frankfurt	2-2	Kaiserslautern	Waldstadion, Frankfurt
15:30	Löw 19'; Körbel 49'	Report	Funkel 73'; Briegel 77'	Attendance: 38,000; Referee: Walter Eschweiler

15 August 1981 2	Kaiserslautern	1-1	Hamburg	Stadion Betzenberg, Kaiserslautern
15:30	Funkel 61'	Report	Magath 10'	Attendance: 29,754; Referee: Karl-Josef Assenmacher

21 August 1981 3	Duisburg	3-1	Kaiserslautern	Wedaustadion, Duisburg
20:00	Seliger 24', 52' (pen.); Szesni 89'	Report	Funkel 63'	Attendance: 12,000; Referee: Volker Roth

25 August 1981 4	Kaiserslautern	3-2	Stuttgart	Stadion Betzenberg, Kaiserslautern
20:00	Bongartz 26'; Brehme 35'; Eigendorf 61'	Report	Six 9'; Martin 78'	Attendance: 32,438; Referee: Gerd Hennig

5 September 1981 5	Borussia Mönchengladbach	2-2	Kaiserslautern	Bökelbergstadion, Mönchengladbach
15:30	Mill 24'; Hannes 35' (pen.)	Report	Brehme 39'; Dusek 66'	Attendance: 21,800; Referee: Werner Ross

11 September 1981 6	Kaiserslautern	4-0	Arminia Bielefeld	Stadion Betzenberg, Kaiserslautern
20:00	Briegel 17'; Funkel 48', 58'; Hübner 85'	Report		Attendance: 19,012; Referee: Udo Horeis

19 September 1981 7	Bayern Munich	4-2	Kaiserslautern	Olympiastadion, Munich
15:30	Hoeneß 24', 36', 88'; Breitner 84'	Report	Briegel 32'; Eilenfeldt 70'	Attendance: 45,000; Referee: Wilfried Heitmann

25 September 1981 8	Kaiserslautern	5-2	Bayer Leverkusen	Stadion Betzenberg, Kaiserslautern
20:00	Melzer 3'; Hofeditz 4', 71'; Briegel 13'; Bongartz 45'	Report	Økland 51'; Glowacz 64'	Attendance: 14,000; Referee: Walter Horstmann

3 October 1981 9	Darmstadt	0-0	Kaiserslautern	Stadion am Böllenfalltor, Darmstadt
15:30		Report		Attendance: 13,000; Referee: Dieter Pauly

17 October 1981 10	Kaiserslautern	1-1	Werder Bremen	Stadion Betzenberg, Kaiserslautern
15:30	Briegel 75'	Report	Gruber 50'	Attendance: 17,240; Referee: Günther Risse

24 October 1981 11	Fortuna Düsseldorf	4-2	Kaiserslautern	Rheinstadion, Düsseldorf
15:30	Wenzel 11' (pen.), 40'; Theis 38', 54'	Report	Hofeditz 22'; Briegel 50' (pen.)	Attendance: 12,500; Referee: Siegfried Brehm

31 October 1981 12	Kaiserslautern	2-1	Karlsruhe	Stadion Betzenberg, Kaiserslautern
15:30	Eigendorf 14'; Funkel 44'	Report	Dohmen 89'	Attendance: 19,075; Referee: Wilfried Heitmann

7 November 1981 13	Eintracht Braunschweig	2-1	Kaiserslautern	Eintracht-Stadion, Braunschweig
15:30	Hollmann 67'; Geyer 78'	Report	Briegel 88' (pen.)	Attendance: 20,000; Referee: Dieter Stäglich

13 November 1981 14	Kaiserslautern	3-3	Bochum	Stadion Betzenberg, Kaiserslautern
20:00	Funkel 2'; Hofeditz 6'; Neues 43'	Report	Schreier 19'; Patzke 33'; Abel 83'	Attendance: 15,548; Referee: Volker Roth

28 November 1981 15	Borussia Dortmund	2-2	Kaiserslautern	Westfalenstadion, Dortmund
15:30	Abramczik 22'; Huber 38'	Report	Melzer 61'; Hofeditz 74'	Attendance: 19,000; Referee: Peter Correll

12 December 1981 16	Nürnberg	4-2	Kaiserslautern	Städtisches Stadion, Nuremberg
15:30	Täuber 5'; Heck 17', 66'; Heidenreich 89'	Report	Briegel 43'; Melzer 72'	Attendance: 13,500; Referee: Jan Redelfs

9 March 1982 17	Kaiserslautern	1-1	Köln	Stadion Betzenberg, Kaiserslautern
20:00	Eilenfeldt 74'	Report	Allofs 83'	Attendance: 31,050; Referee: Jürgen Messmer

30 January 1982 20	Kaiserslautern	3-0	MSV Duisburg	Stadion Betzenberg, Kaiserslautern
15:30	Funkel 34'; Brummer 85'; Dusek 90'	Report		Attendance: 11,096; Referee: Wolf-Rüdiger Umbach

6 February 1982 21	Stuttgart	4-0	Kaiserslautern	Neckarstadion, Stuttgart
15:30	Reichert 30', 47', 52'; Ohlicher 38'	Report		Attendance: 17,000; Referee: Gerd Hennig

13 February 1982 22	Kaiserslautern	3-2	Borussia Mönchengladbach	Stadion Betzenberg, Kaiserslautern
15:30	Briegel 60' (pen.); Hübner 68'; Funkel 88'	Report	Pinkall 18', 58'	Attendance: 23,745; Referee: Friedrich Retzmann

20 February 1982 18	Kaiserslautern	6-2	Eintracht Frankfurt	Stadion Betzenberg, Kaiserslautern
15:30	Körbel 42' (o.g.); Briegel 43'; Funkel 61'; Eilenfeldt 83', 88'; Eigendorf 90'	Report	Neuberger 23'; Cha 25'	Attendance: 16,575; Referee: Pauly Dieter

27 February 1982 23	Arminia Bielefeld	2-0	Kaiserslautern	Stadion Alm, Bielefeld
15:30	Riedl 16' (pen.); Geils 89'	Report		Attendance: 15,000; Referee: Adolf Ermer

6 March 1982 24	Kaiserslautern	2-1	Bayern Munich	Olympiastadion, Munich
15:30	Dusek 78'; Eilenfeldt 83'	Report	Rummenigge 43'	Attendance: 34,154; Referee: Dieter Stäglich

13 March 1982 25	Bayer Leverkusen	0-1	Kaiserslautern	Ulrich-Haberland-Stadion, Leverkusen
15:30		Report	Hofeditz 66'	Attendance: 5,000; Referee: Max Klauser

30 March 1982 26	Kaiserslautern	3-0	Darmstadt	Stadion Betzenberg, Kaiserslautern
20:00	Brehme 27'; Eilenfeldt 31'; Briegel 48'	Report	Cestonaro 90'	Attendance: 30,000; Referee: Peter Gabor

3 April 1982 27	Werder Bremen	0-1	Kaiserslautern	Weserstadion, Bremen
15:30		Report	Bongartz 4'	Attendance: 22,000; Referee: Manfred Uhlig

17 April 1982 29	Kaiserslautern	1-1	Fortuna Düsseldorf	Stadion Betzenberg, Kaiserslautern
15:30	Hofeditz 4'	Report	Weikl 5'	Attendance: 15,000; Referee: Philippe Mercier

24 April 1982 29	Karlsruhe	1-1	Kaiserslautern	Wildparkstadion, Karlsruhe
15:30	Bold 85'	Report	Dohmen 70' (o.g.)	Attendance: 22,000; Referee: Wolf-Dieter Ahlenfelder

27 April 1982 30	Kaiserslautern	5-3	Eintracht Braunschweig	Stadion Betzenberg, Kaiserslautern
20:00	Briegel 25'; Eilenfeldt 54'; Kindermann 78' (o.g.); Melzer 83'; Bongartz 85'	Report	Pahl 16'; Tripbacher 31'; Kindermann 68'	Attendance: 14,488; Referee: Hans Wahmann

30 April 1982 19	Hamburg	4-0	Kaiserslautern	Volksparkstadion, Hamburg
20:00	Bastrup 7'; Hrubesch 63'; Wehmeyer 86' von Heesen 89'	Report		Attendance: 27,300; Referee: Karl-Josef Assenmacher

8 May 1982 31	Bochum	1-2	Kaiserslautern	Ruhrstadion, Bochum
15:30	Patzke 15' (pen.)	Report	Brehme 65'; Eilenfeldt 68'	Attendance: 8,000; Referee: Max Klauser

14 May 1982 32	Kaiserslautern	2-1	Borussia Dortmund	Stadion Betzenberg, Kaiserslautern
20:00	Hofeditz 25'; Hübner 87'	Report	Burgsmüller 66'	Attendance: 24,091; Referee: Norbert Brückner

22 May 1982 33	Kaiserslautern	2-1	Nürnberg	Stadion Betzenberg, Kaiserslautern
15:30	Hofeditz 21'; Dusek 41'	Report	Täuber 89'	Attendance: 15,095; Referee: Uwe Kasperowski

29 May 1982 34	Köln	3-4	Kaiserslautern	Müngersdorfer Stadion, Cologne
15:30	Allofs 8'; Cullmann 34'; Strack 63'	Report	Neues 24'; Hofeditz 31'; Briegel 48'; Dusek 73'	Attendance: 15,000; Referee: Adolf Ermer

=== DFB-Pokal ===
29 August 1981 First round	Werder Bremen	1-0	Kaiserslautern	Weserstadion, Bremen
15:30	Reinders 44' (pen.)	Report		Attendance: 12,000; Referee: Peter Gabor

=== UEFA Cup ===
==== First round ====
16 September 1981 First leg	Kaiserslautern (Germany)	1–0	(Bulgaria) Akademik Sofia	Stadion Betzenberg, Kaiserslautern
19:00	Brehme 28' (pen.)	Report		Referee: Zoran Petrović (Yugoslavia)

30 September 1981 Second leg	Akademik Sofia (Bulgaria)	1–2	(Germany) Kaiserslautern	Sportkomplex Akademik, Sofia
17:30	Lipenski 15'	Report	Melzer 19'; Briegel 25' (pen.)	Referee: Alain Delmer (France)

==== Second round ====
21 October 1981 First leg	Spartak Moscow (Soviet Union)	2–1	(Germany) Kaiserslautern	Lokomotiv Stadium, Moscow
16:00	Rodionov 38'; Gavrilov 61'	Report	Funkel 82'	Referee: Egbert Mulder (Netherlands)

4 November 1981 Second leg	Kaiserslautern (Germany)	4–0	(Soviet Union) Spartak Moscow	Stadion Betzenberg, Kaiserslautern
19:00	Funkel 12'; Briegel 44', 65'; Geye 54'	Report		Referee: Victoriano Sanchez Arminio (Spain)

==== Third round ====
25 November 1981 First leg	Lokeren (Belgium)	1–0	(Germany) Kaiserslautern	Daknamstadion, Lokeren
19:00	Lato 46'	Report		Referee: Gianfranco Menegali (Italy)

9 December 1981 Second leg	Kaiserslautern (Germany)	4–1	(Belgium) Lokeren	Stadion Betzenberg, Kaiserslautern
19:00	Hofeditz 43'; Briegel 63'; Eilenfeldt 73'; Funkel 80'	Report	Guðjohnsen 84'	Referee: Ioan Igna (Romania)

==== Quarter-finals ====
3 March 1982 First leg	Real Madrid (Spain)	3–1	(Germany) Kaiserslautern	Santiago Bernabéu, Madrid
20:00	Cunningham 25'; Hernández 34'; Juanito 68'	Report	Eilenfeldt 81' (pen.)	Referee: Vojtech Christov (Czechoslovakia)

17 March 1982 Second leg	Kaiserslautern (Germany)	5–0	(Spain) Real Madrid	Stadion Betzenberg, Kaiserslautern
19:00	Funkel 7', 17'; Bongartz 48'; Eilenfeldt 54'; Geye 71'	Report		Referee: Károly Palotai (Hungary)

==== Semi-finals ====
7 April 1982 First leg	Kaiserslautern (Germany)	1–1	(Sweden) IFK Göteborg	Stadion Betzenberg, Kaiserslautern
20:00	Hofeditz 9'	Report	Corneliusson 28'	Attendance: 34,500; Referee: Roger Schoeters (Belgium)

21 April 1982 Second leg	IFK Göteborg (Sweden)	2–1 (a.e.t.)	(Germany) Kaiserslautern	Ullevi, Gothenburg
19:00	Holmgren 42'; Fredriksson 102' (pen.)	Report	Geye 57'	Attendance: 50,053; Referee: Romualdas Yushka (Soviet Union)
