= October 4 =

October 4 this year in various calendars
- Sunday, 4 October 2026
Akan	Nkyikwasi
Armenian	16 Sahmi 1476
Aztec	Izcalli 2, 8 Cuāuhtli
Babylonian	21 Ululu, 2337 SE
Balinese pawukon	Luang, Pepet, Kajeng, Sri, Wage, Urukung, Redite of Wayang, Ludra, Dadi, Raksasa
Bengali	19 Ashshin, BS 1433
Chinese	Yin Metal Pig・Hairy Head Mansion; Fire Horse Year, Month 8, Day 24 (Qiufen, 4 days until Hanlu)
Common Era	4 October 2026 CE
Coptic	24 Thout, AM 1743
Egyptian	21 Mechir, 2775 NE
Ethiopian	24 Maskaram, 2019 Amätä Məhrät
French Republican	Décade II, Duodi de Vendémiaire de l'Année 235 de la République
Gregorian	4 October, AD 2026
Hebrew	23 Tishrei, AM 5787
Hindu	Punarvasu・Parigha; Solar: 18 Āśvina, 1948 SE; Lunisolar: Aṣṭamī, Kṛishna pakṣa of Bhādrapada, 2083 VE; Rāudra・5127 KY・1,872,852
Icelandic	Sunnudagur, 11 Haustmánuður 2026
Islamic	21 Rabi' al-thani, AH 1448 (using tabular method)
ISO week date	2026-W40-7
Japanese	24 Hazuki, Reiwa 8 (Shūbun, 4 days until Kanro)
Julian	21 September, AD 2026 (AM 7534)
Julian day	2461318
Korean	24 Dakdal, 4359 DE
Maya	13.0.13.17.15; 8 Yax, 8 Men
Roman	ante diem XI Kalendas Octobres, MMDCCLXXIX AUC
Solar Hijri	12 Mehr, SH 1405
Tibetan	23 khrums, me pho rta 2153 or 1772 or 1000

<<	October					>>
Su	Mo	Tu	We	Th	Fr	Sa
				1	2	3
4	5	6	7	8	9	10
11	12	13	14	15	16	17
18	19	20	21	22	23	24
25	26	27	28	29	30	31
2026

October 4 in recent years
2026 (Sunday)
2025 (Saturday)
2024 (Friday)
2023 (Wednesday)
2022 (Tuesday)
2021 (Monday)
2020 (Sunday)
2019 (Friday)
2018 (Thursday)
2017 (Wednesday)

October 4 is the 277th day of the year (278th in leap years) in the Gregorian calendar; 88 days remain until the end of the year.

== Events ==
=== Pre-1600 ===
- AD 23 – Rebels sack the Chinese capital Chang'an during a peasant rebellion.
- 1209 – Otto IV is crowned Emperor of the Holy Roman Empire by Pope Innocent III.
- 1302 – The Byzantine–Venetian War comes to an end.
- 1363 – Battle of Lake Poyang: In one of the largest naval battles in history, Zhu Yuanzhang's rebels defeat rival Chen Youliang.
- 1511 – Formation of the Holy League of Aragon, the Papal States and Venice against France.
- 1535 – The Coverdale Bible is printed, with translations into English by William Tyndale and Myles Coverdale.
- 1582 – The Gregorian Calendar is introduced by Pope Gregory XIII.

=== 1601–1900 ===
- 1602 – Eighty Years' War and the Anglo-Spanish War: A fleet of Spanish galleys are defeated by English and Dutch galleons in the English Channel.
- 1636 – Thirty Years' War: The Swedish Army defeats the armies of Saxony and the Holy Roman Empire at the Battle of Wittstock.
- 1693 – Nine Years' War: Piedmontese troops are defeated by the French.
- 1777 – American Revolutionary War: Troops under George Washington are repelled by British troops under William Howe.
- 1795 – Napoleon first rises to prominence by suppressing counter-revolutionary rioters threatening the National Convention.
- 1824 – Mexico adopts a new constitution and becomes a federal republic.
- 1830 – The Belgian Revolution takes legal form when the provisional government secedes from the Netherlands.
- 1853 – The Crimean War begins when the Ottoman Empire declares war on the Russian Empire.
- 1862 – American Civil War: The two-day Second Battle of Corinth ends in a Union victory, with General William Rosecrans protecting the critical rail junction of Corinth, Mississippi from Confederate forces under General Earl Van Dorn.
- 1876 – The Agricultural and Mechanical College of Texas (now known as Texas A&M) opens as the first public college in Texas.
- 1883 – First meeting of the Boys' Brigade in Glasgow, Scotland.
- 1895 – Horace Rawlins wins the first U.S. Open Men's Golf Championship.

=== 1901–present ===
- 1917 – World War I: The Battle of Broodseinde is fought between the British and German armies in Flanders.
- 1918 – World War I: An explosion kills more than 100 people and destroys a Shell Loading Plant in New Jersey.
- 1920 – The Mannerheim League for Child Welfare, a Finnish non-governmental organization, is founded on the initiative of Sophie Mannerheim.
- 1925 – Great Syrian Revolt: Rebels led by Fawzi al-Qawuqji capture Hama from the French Mandate of Syria.
- 1925 – S2, a Finnish Sokol class torpedo boat, sinks during a fierce storm near the coast of Pori in the Gulf of Bothnia, taking with it the whole crew of 53.
- 1927 – Gutzon Borglum begins sculpting Mount Rushmore.
- 1936 – The Metropolitan Police and various anti-fascist organizations violently clash in the Battle of Cable Street.
- 1941 – Norman Rockwell's Willie Gillis character debuts on the cover of The Saturday Evening Post.
- 1957 – Sputnik 1 becomes the first artificial satellite to orbit the Earth.
- 1958 – The current constitution of France is adopted.
- 1960 – Eastern Airlines flight 375 crashes on takeoff from Boston's Logan International Airport, killing 62 people of the 72 aboard.
- 1963 – Hurricane Flora kills 6,000 in Cuba and Haiti.
- 1965 – Pope Paul VI begins the first papal visit to the Americas.
- 1966 – Basutoland becomes independent from the United Kingdom and is renamed Lesotho.
- 1967 – Omar Ali Saifuddien III of Brunei abdicates in favour of his son.
- 1983 – Richard Noble sets a new land speed record of 633.468 miles per hour (1,019.468 km/h) at the Black Rock Desert in Nevada.
- 1985 – The Free Software Foundation is founded.
- 1991 – The Protocol on Environmental Protection to the Antarctic Treaty is opened for signature.
- 1992 – The Rome General Peace Accords end a 16-year civil war in Mozambique.
- 1992 – El Al Flight 1862 crashes into two apartment buildings in Amsterdam, killing 43 including 39 on the ground.
- 1993 – Battle of Mogadishu occurs killing 18 U.S. Special Forces, two UN Peacekeepers and at least 600 Somalian militia men and civilians.
- 1993 – Tanks bombard the Russian parliament, while demonstrators against President Yeltsin rally outside.
- 1997 – The second largest cash robbery in U.S. history occurs in North Carolina.
- 2001 – Siberia Airlines Flight 1812 crashes after being struck by an errant Ukrainian missile. Seventy-eight people are killed.
- 2003 – The Maxim restaurant suicide bombing in Israel kills twenty-one Israelis, both Jews and Arabs.
- 2004 – SpaceShipOne wins the Ansari X Prize for private spaceflight.
- 2006 – WikiLeaks is launched.
- 2010 – The Ajka plant accident in Hungary releases a million cubic metres of liquid alumina sludge, killing nine, injuring 122, and severely contaminating two major rivers.
- 2017 – Joint Nigerien-American Special Forces are ambushed by Islamic State militants outside the village of Tongo Tongo.

== Births ==
=== Pre-1600 ===
- 1160 – Alys, Countess of the Vexin, daughter of Louis VII of France (died c. 1220)
- 1274 – Rudolf I, Duke of Bavaria (died 1319)
- 1276 – Margaret of Brabant (died 1311)
- 1289 – Louis X of France (died 1316)
- 1331 – James Butler, 2nd Earl of Ormond, Irish politician, Lord Justice of Ireland (died 1382)
- 1379 – Henry III of Castile (died 1406)
- 1507 – Francis Bigod, English noble (died 1537)
- 1515 – Lucas Cranach the Younger, German painter (died 1586)
- 1522 – Gabriele Paleotti, Catholic cardinal (died 1597)
- 1524 – Francisco Vallés, Spanish physician (died 1592)
- 1532 – Francisco de Toledo, Catholic cardinal (died 1596)
- 1542 – Robert Bellarmine, Italian cardinal and saint (died 1621)
- 1550 – Charles IX of Sweden (died 1611)
- 1562 – Christen Sørensen Longomontanus, Danish astronomer and author (died 1647)
- 1570 – Péter Pázmány, Hungarian cardinal and philosopher (died 1637)
- 1579 – Guido Bentivoglio, Italian cardinal (died 1644)
- 1585 – Anna of Tyrol, Holy Roman Empress (died 1618)

=== 1601–1900 ===
- 1625 – Jacqueline Pascal, French nun and composer (died 1661)
- 1626 – Richard Cromwell, English academic and politician, Lord Protector of Great Britain (died 1712)
- 1633 – Bernardino Ramazzini, Italian physician (died 1714)
- 1657 – Francesco Solimena, Italian painter and illustrator (died 1747)
- 1694 – Lord George Murray, Scottish Jacobite General (died 1760)
- 1720 – Giovanni Battista Piranesi, Italian sculptor and illustrator (died 1778)
- 1723 – Nikolaus Poda von Neuhaus, German entomologist and author (died 1798)
- 1759 – Louis François Antoine Arbogast, French mathematician and academic (died 1803)
- 1768 – Francisco José de Caldas, Colombian naturalist, executed by royalists in the war of independence (died 1816)
- 1787 – François Guizot, French historian and politician, 22nd Prime Minister of France (died 1874)
- 1793 – Charles Pearson, English lawyer and politician (died 1862)
- 1807 – Louis-Hippolyte Lafontaine, Canadian lawyer and politician, 2nd Premier of Canada East (died 1864)
- 1814 – Jean-François Millet, French painter and educator (died 1875)
- 1822 – Rutherford B. Hayes, American general, lawyer, and politician, 19th President of the United States (died 1893)
- 1835 – Jenny Twitchell Kempton, American opera singer and educator (died 1921)
- 1836 – Juliette Adam, French author (died 1936)
- 1837 – Auguste-Réal Angers, Canadian judge and politician, 6th Lieutenant Governor of Quebec (died 1919)
- 1841 – Prudente de Morais, Brazilian lawyer and politician, 3rd President of Brazil (died 1912)
- 1841 – Maria Sophie of Bavaria (died 1925)
- 1843 – Marie-Alphonsine Danil Ghattas, Palestinian nun and Catholic Saint (died 1927)
- 1858 – Léon Serpollet, French businessman (died 1903)
- 1861 – Walter Rauschenbusch, American pastor and theologian (died 1918)
- 1861 – Frederic Remington, American painter, sculptor, and illustrator (died 1909)
- 1862 – Johanna van Gogh-Bonger, sister-in-law of Vincent van Gogh, who is credited with promoting his posthumous fame (died 1925).
- 1862 – Edward Stratemeyer, American author and publisher (died 1930)
- 1868 – Marcelo Torcuato de Alvear, Argentinian lawyer and politician, 20th President of Argentina (died 1942)
- 1874 – John Ellis, English executioner (died 1932)
- 1876 – Florence Eliza Allen, American mathematician and suffrage activist (died 1960)
- 1877 – Razor Smith, English cricketer (died 1946)
- 1879 – Robert Edwards, American artist, musician, and writer (died 1948)
- 1880 – Damon Runyon, American newspaperman and short story writer. (died 1946)
- 1881 – Walther von Brauchitsch, German field marshal (died 1948)
- 1884 – Ramchandra Shukla, Indian historian and author (died 1941)
- 1888 – Lucy Tayiah Eads, American tribal chief (died 1961)
- 1888 – Oscar Mathisen, Norwegian speed skater (died 1954)
- 1890 – Alan L. Hart, American physician and author (died 1962)
- 1890 – Osman Cemal Kaygılı, Turkish writer and journalist (died 1945)
- 1892 – Engelbert Dollfuss, Austrian soldier and politician, 14th Federal Chancellor of Austria (died 1934)
- 1892 – Hermann Glauert, English aerodynamicist and author (died 1934)
- 1892 – Robert Lawson, American author and illustrator (died 1957)
- 1895 – Buster Keaton, American film actor, director, and producer (died 1966)
- 1895 – Richard Sorge, German journalist and spy (died 1944)
- 1896 – Dorothy Lawrence, English reporter, who secretly posed as a man to become a soldier during World War I (died 1964)
- 1900 – August Mälk, Estonian author and playwright (died 1987)

=== 1901–present ===
- 1903 – Bona Arsenault, Canadian genealogist, historian, and politician (died 1993)
- 1903 – John Vincent Atanasoff, American physicist and academic, invented the Atanasoff–Berry computer (died 1995)
- 1903 – Pierre Garbay, French general (died 1980)
- 1903 – Ernst Kaltenbrunner, Austrian-German lawyer and general, convicted Nuremberg war criminal (died 1946)
- 1906 – Mary Celine Fasenmyer, American mathematician (died 1996)
- 1907 – Alain Daniélou, French-Swiss historian and academic (died 1994)
- 1910 – Frankie Crosetti, American baseball player and coach (died 2002)
- 1910 – Cahit Sıtkı Tarancı, Turkish poet and author (died 1956)
- 1911 – Mary Two-Axe Earley, Canadian indigenous women's rights activist (died 1996)
- 1913 – Martial Célestin, Haitian lawyer and politician, 1st Prime Minister of Haiti (died 2011)
- 1914 – Jim Cairns, Australian economist and politician, 4th Deputy Prime Minister of Australia (died 2003)
- 1914 – Brendan Gill, American journalist and essayist (died 1997)
- 1916 – Vitaly Ginzburg, Russian physicist and academic, Nobel Prize laureate (died 2009)
- 1916 – Jan Murray, American comedian, actor, and game show host (died 2006)
- 1916 – George Sidney, American director and producer (died 2002)
- 1916 – Ken Wood, inventor of the Kenwood Chef food mixer (died 1997)
- 1917 – Violeta Parra, Chilean singer-songwriter and guitarist (died 1967)
- 1918 – Kenichi Fukui, Japanese chemist and academic, Nobel Prize laureate (died 1998)
- 1921 – Stella Pevsner, American children's author (died 2020)
- 1922 – Malcolm Baldrige Jr., American businessman and politician, 26th United States Secretary of Commerce (died 1987)
- 1922 – Shin Kyuk-ho, South Korean-Japanese businessman, founded Lotte Group (died 2020)
- 1922 – Don Lenhardt, American baseball player and coach (died 2014)
- 1923 – Charlton Heston, American actor, director and gun rights activist (died 2008)
- 1924 – Donald J. Sobol, American soldier and author (died 2012)
- 1925 – Roger Wood, Belgian-American journalist (died 2012)
- 1926 – Raymond Watson, American businessman (died 2012)
- 1927 – Wolf Kahn, American painter and academic (died 2020)
- 1928 – Alvin Toffler, German-American journalist and author (died 2016)
- 1928 – Torben Ulrich, Danish-American tennis player (died 2023)
- 1929 – Scotty Beckett, American actor and singer (died 1968)
- 1929 – John E. Mack, American psychiatrist and author (died 2004)
- 1929 – Leroy Van Dyke, American singer-songwriter and guitarist
- 1931 – Terence Conran, English designer and businessman (died 2020)
- 1931 – Basil D'Oliveira, South African-English cricketer and footballer (died 2011)
- 1931 – Richard Rorty, American philosopher and author (died 2007)
- 1932 – Felicia Farr, American actress and model
- 1933 – German Moreno, Filipino television host and actor (died 2016)
- 1933 – Ann Thwaite, English author
- 1933 – John Noble Wilford, American reporter and Pulitzer Prize winner (died 2025)
- 1934 – Sam Huff, American football player, coach, and sportscaster (died 2021)
- 1935 – Jimmy Orr, American football player (died 2020)
- 1936 – Charlie Hurley, Irish footballer and manager (died 2024)
- 1936 – Giles Radice, Baron Radice, English politician (died 2022)
- 1937 – Jackie Collins, English-American author and actress (died 2015)
- 1937 – David Crocker, American philosopher and academic
- 1937 – Gail Gilmore, Canadian-American actress and dancer (died 2014)
- 1937 – Lloyd Green, American steel guitar player
- 1937 – Jim Sillars, Scottish lawyer and politician
- 1938 – Norman D. Wilson, American actor (died 2004)
- 1938 – Kurt Wüthrich, Swiss chemist and biophysicist, Nobel Prize laureate
- 1939 – Ivan Mauger, New Zealand speedway rider (died 2018)
- 1940 – Vic Hadfield, Canadian ice hockey player
- 1940 – Silvio Marzolini, Argentinian footballer and manager (died 2020)
- 1940 – Steve Swallow, American bass player and composer
- 1940 – Alberto Vilar, American businessman and philanthropist (died 2021)
- 1941 – Roy Blount Jr., American humorist and journalist
- 1941 – Karen Cushman, American author
- 1941 – Karl Oppitzhauser, Austrian race car driver
- 1941 – Anne Rice, American author (died 2021)
- 1941 – Robert Wilson, American director and playwright (died 2025)
- 1942 – Bernice Johnson Reagon, American singer-songwriter (died 2024)
- 1942 – Karl W. Richter, American lieutenant and pilot (died 1967)
- 1942 – Jóhanna Sigurðardóttir, Icelandic politician, 24th Prime Minister of Iceland
- 1942 – Christopher Stone, American actor and screenwriter (died 1995)
- 1943 – H. Rap Brown, American activist (died 2025)
- 1943 – Owen Davidson, Australian tennis player (died 2023)
- 1943 – Karl-Gustav Kaisla, Finnish ice hockey player and referee (died 2012)
- 1943 – Dietmar Mürdter, German footballer
- 1943 – Jimy Williams, American baseball player and manager (died 2024)
- 1944 – Colin Bundy, South African-English historian and academic
- 1944 – Rocío Dúrcal, Spanish singer and actress (died 2006)
- 1944 – Tony La Russa, American baseball player and manager
- 1944 – John McFall, Baron McFall of Alcluith, Scottish educator and politician
- 1945 – Clifton Davis, American singer-songwriter, actor, and minister
- 1946 – Larry Clapp, American lawyer and politician (died 2013)
- 1946 – Chuck Hagel, American sergeant and politician, 24th United States Secretary of Defense
- 1946 – Michael Mullen, American admiral
- 1946 – Susan Sarandon, American actress and activist
- 1947 – Julien Clerc, French singer-songwriter and pianist
- 1947 – Jim Fielder, American bass player
- 1947 – Ann Widdecombe, English politician, Shadow Secretary of State for Health (died 2026)
- 1948 – Iain Hewitson, New Zealand-Australian chef, restaurateur, author, and television personality
- 1948 – Linda McMahon, American businesswoman and politician
- 1948 – Duke Robillard, American singer-songwriter and guitarist
- 1949 – Armand Assante, American actor and producer
- 1949 – Stephen Gyllenhaal, American director, producer, and screenwriter
- 1950 – Alan Rosenberg, American actor
- 1951 – Bakhytzhan Kanapyanov, Kazakh poet and author
- 1951 – Truck Robinson, American basketball player and coach
- 1952 – Anita DeFrantz, American rower and sports administrator
- 1952 – Jody Stephens, American rock drummer
- 1952 – Zinha Vaz, Bissau-Guinean women's rights activist and politician
- 1953 – Gil Moore, Canadian singer-songwriter, drummer, and producer
- 1953 – Andreas Vollenweider, Swiss harp player
- 1955 – John Rutherford, Scottish rugby player
- 1955 – Jorge Valdano, Argentinian footballer, coach, and manager
- 1956 – Lesley Glaister, English author and playwright
- 1956 – Charlie Leibrandt, American baseball player
- 1956 – Sherri Turner, American golfer
- 1956 – Christoph Waltz, Austrian-German actor
- 1957 – Bill Fagerbakke, American actor
- 1957 – Yngve Moe, Norwegian bass player and songwriter (died 2013)
- 1957 – Russell Simmons, American businessman, founded Def Jam Recordings and Phat Farm
- 1958 – Barbara Kooyman, American singer-songwriter and guitarist
- 1958 – Wendy Makkena, American actress
- 1958 – Anneka Rice, Welsh radio and television host
- 1959 – Chris Lowe, English singer and keyboard player
- 1959 – Tony Meo, English snooker player
- 1959 – Hitonari Tsuji, Japanese author, composer, and director
- 1960 – Joe Boever, American baseball player
- 1960 – Henry Worsley, English colonel and explorer (died 2016)
- 1961 – Philippe Russo, French singer-songwriter and guitarist
- 1961 – Jon Secada, Cuban-American singer-songwriter
- 1961 – Kazuki Takahashi, Japanese author and illustrator, created Yu-Gi-Oh! (died 2022)
- 1962 – Carlos Carsolio, Mexican mountaineer
- 1963 – A. C. Green, American basketball player
- 1963 – Koji Ishikawa, Japanese author and illustrator
- 1964 – Francis Magalona, Filipino rapper, producer, and actor (died 2009)
- 1964 – Yvonne Murray, Scottish runner
- 1965 – Olaf Backasch, German footballer
- 1965 – Skip Heller, American singer-songwriter, guitarist, and producer
- 1965 – Steve Olin, American baseball player (died 1993)
- 1965 – Micky Ward, American boxer
- 1967 – Vicky Bullett, American basketball player and coach
- 1967 – Nick Green, Australian rower
- 1967 – Liev Schreiber, American actor and director
- 1968 – Richard Hancox, English footballer and manager
- 1968 – Tim Wise, American activist and author
- 1969 – Abraham Benrubi, American actor
- 1971 – Darren Middleton, Australian singer-songwriter and guitarist
- 1973 – M. Ward, American singer-songwriter
- 1974 – Paco León, Spanish actor, director, producer, and screenwriter
- 1975 – Cristiano Lucarelli, Italian footballer and manager
- 1976 – Mauro Camoranesi, Argentinian-Italian footballer and manager
- 1976 – Alicia Silverstone, American actress, producer, and author
- 1976 – Ueli Steck, Swiss mountaineer and rock climber (died 2017)
- 1977 – Richard Reed Parry, Canadian guitarist, songwriter, and producer
- 1978 – Dana Davis, American actress and author
- 1978 – Kyle Lohse, American baseball player
- 1979 – Caitríona Balfe, Irish actress
- 1979 – Rachael Leigh Cook, American actress
- 1979 – Adam Voges, Australian cricketer
- 1980 – Sarah Fisher, American race car driver
- 1980 – James Jones, American basketball player
- 1980 – Tomáš Rosický, Czech footballer
- 1981 – Justin Williams, Canadian-American ice hockey player
- 1982 – Tony Gwynn Jr., American baseball player
- 1982 – Ilhan Omar, American politician
- 1982 – Jered Weaver, American baseball player
- 1983 – Vicky Krieps, Luxembourgish actress
- 1983 – Kurt Suzuki, American baseball player
- 1984 – Lena Katina, Russian singer-songwriter
- 1984 – Petri Kontiola, Finnish ice hockey player
- 1984 – Karolina Tymińska, Polish heptathlete
- 1985 – Shontelle, Barbadian singer-songwriter
- 1985 – Thorsten Wiedemann, German rugby player
- 1987 – Marina Weisband, German politician
- 1988 – Melissa Benoist, American actress and singer
- 1988 – Lonnie Chisenhall, American baseball player
- 1988 – Caner Erkin, Turkish footballer
- 1988 – Evgeni Krasnopolski, Israeli figure skater
- 1988 – Derrick Rose, American basketball player
- 1989 – Dakota Johnson, American actress
- 1990 – Signy Aarna, Estonian footballer
- 1990 – Saki, Japanese guitarist and songwriter
- 1990 – Sergey Shubenkov, Russian hurdler
- 1991 – Leigh-Anne Pinnock, English singer and songwriter
- 1993 – Mitchell Swepson, Australian cricketer
- 1994 – Mike Williams, American football player
- 1995 – Jeonghan, South Korean singer
- 1995 – Kenny Clark, American football player
- 1995 – Mikolas Josef, Czech singer and songwriter
- 1996 – Ella Balinska, English actress
- 1997 – Rishabh Pant, Indian cricketer
- 1997 – Yuju, South Korean singer
- 2001 – Graham Campbell, American actor

== Deaths ==
=== Pre-1600 ===
- 744 – Yazid III, Umayyad caliph (born 701)
- 863 – Turpio, Frankish nobleman
- 1052 – Vladimir of Novgorod (born 1020)
- 1160 – Constance of Castile, Queen of France (born 1141)
- 1189 – Gerard de Ridefort, Grand Master of the Knights Templar
- 1221 – William IV Talvas, Count of Ponthieu (born 1179)
- 1227 – Caliph al-Adil of Morocco
- 1250 – Herman VI, Margrave of Baden (born 1226)
- 1305 – Emperor Kameyama of Japan (born 1249)
- 1361 – John de Mowbray, 3rd Baron Mowbray, English baron (born 1310)
- 1497 – John, Prince of Asturias, only son of Ferdinand II of Aragon and Isabella I of Castile (born 1478)
- 1582 – Teresa of Ávila, Spanish nun and saint (born 1515)
- 1597 – Sarsa Dengel, Ethiopian emperor (born 1550)

=== 1601–1900 ===
- 1646 – Thomas Howard, 21st Earl of Arundel, English courtier and politician, Earl Marshal of the United Kingdom (born 1586)
- 1660 – Francesco Albani, Italian painter (born 1578)
- 1661 – Jacqueline Pascal, French nun and composer (born 1625)
- 1669 – Rembrandt, Dutch painter and illustrator (born 1606)
- 1680 – Pierre-Paul Riquet, French engineer, designed the Canal du Midi (born 1609)
- 1743 – John Campbell, 2nd Duke of Argyll, Scottish commander and politician, Lord Lieutenant of Surrey (born 1678)
- 1747 – Amaro Pargo, Spanish corsair (born 1678)
- 1749 – Baron Franz von der Trenck, Austrian soldier (born 1711)
- 1755 – Samuel von Cocceji, Prussian jurist and statesman (born 1679)
- 1821 – John Rennie the Elder, Scottish engineer, designed the Waterloo Bridge (born 1761)
- 1827 – Grigorios Zalykis, Greek-French lexicographer and scholar (born 1785)
- 1851 – Manuel Godoy, Spanish general and politician, Prime Minister of Spain (born 1767)
- 1852 – James Whitcomb, American lawyer and politician, 8th Governor of Indiana (born 1795)
- 1859 – Karl Baedeker, German publisher, founded Baedeker (born 1801)
- 1864 – Joseph Montferrand, Canadian logger and strongman (born 1802)
- 1867 – Francis Xavier Seelos, German-American priest and missionary (born 1819)
- 1871 – Sarel Cilliers, South African spiritual leader and preacher (born 1801)
- 1890 – Catherine Booth, English theologian and saint, co-founded The Salvation Army (born 1829)

=== 1901–present ===
- 1903 – Otto Weininger, Austrian philosopher and author (born 1880)
- 1904 – Frédéric Auguste Bartholdi, French sculptor, designed the Statue of Liberty (born 1834)
- 1904 – Carl Josef Bayer, Austrian chemist and academic (born 1847)
- 1910 – Sergey Muromtsev, Russian lawyer and politician (born 1850)
- 1935 – Jean Béraud, French painter and academic (born 1849)
- 1935 – Marie Gutheil-Schoder, German soprano, actress, and director (born 1874)
- 1943 – Irena Iłłakowicz, German-Polish lieutenant (born 1906)
- 1944 – Al Smith, American lawyer and politician, 42nd Governor of New York (born 1873)
- 1946 – Barney Oldfield, American race car driver and actor (born 1878)
- 1947 – Max Planck, German physicist and academic, Nobel Prize laureate (born 1858)
- 1951 – Henrietta Lacks, American medical patient (born 1920)
- 1955 – Alexander Papagos, Greek general and politician, 152nd Prime Minister of Greece (born 1883)
- 1958 – Ida Wüst, German actress and screenwriter (born 1884)
- 1961 – Benjamin, Russian metropolitan (born 1880)
- 1963 – Alar Kotli, Estonian architect (born 1904)
- 1970 – Janis Joplin, American singer-songwriter (born 1943)
- 1974 – Anne Sexton, American poet and author (born 1928)
- 1975 – Friedrich Lutz, German economist (born 1901)
- 1975 – Joan Whitney Payson, American businesswoman and philanthropist (born 1903)
- 1977 – José Ber Gelbard, Argentinian activist and politician (born 1917)
- 1980 – Pyotr Masherov, First Secretary of the Communist Party of Byelorussia (born 1918)
- 1981 – Freddie Lindstrom, American baseball player and coach (born 1905)
- 1982 – Glenn Gould, Canadian pianist and conductor (born 1932)
- 1982 – Stefanos Stefanopoulos, Greek politician, 165th Prime Minister of Greece (born 1898)
- 1988 – Zlatko Grgić, Croatian-Canadian animator, director, and screenwriter (born 1931)
- 1989 – Graham Chapman, English actor and screenwriter, member of Monty Python (born 1941)
- 1990 – Mārtiņš Zīverts, Latvian playwright (born 1903)
- 1992 – Denny Hulme, New Zealand race car driver (born 1936)
- 1994 – Danny Gatton, American guitarist (born 1945)
- 1997 – Otto Ernst Remer, German general (born 1912)
- 1997 – Gunpei Yokoi, Japanese game designer, created the Game Boy (born 1941)
- 1998 – S. Arasaratnam, Sri Lankan historian and academic (born 1930)
- 1999 – Bernard Buffet, French painter and illustrator (born 1928)
- 1999 – Art Farmer, American trumpet player and composer (born 1928)
- 2000 – Yu Kuo-hwa, Chinese politician, 32nd Premier of the Republic of China (born 1914)
- 2000 – Michael Smith, English-Canadian biochemist and geneticist, Nobel Prize laureate (born 1932)
- 2001 – Blaise Alexander, American race car driver (born 1976)
- 2001 – John Collins, American guitarist (born 1913)
- 2001 – Ahron Soloveichik, Russian rabbi and scholar (born 1917)
- 2002 – André Delvaux, Belgian-Spanish director and screenwriter (born 1926)
- 2003 – Sid McMath, American lawyer and politician, 34th Governor of Arkansas (born 1912)
- 2004 – Gordon Cooper, American colonel, engineer, and astronaut (born 1927)
- 2005 – Stanley K. Hathaway, American lawyer and politician, 40th United States Secretary of the Interior (born 1924)
- 2007 – Qassem Al-Nasser, Jordanian general (born 1925)
- 2009 – Gerhard Kaufhold, German footballer (born 1928)
- 2009 – Günther Rall, German general and pilot (born 1918)
- 2010 – Norman Wisdom, English actor, comedian, and singer-songwriter (born 1915)
- 2011 – Doris Belack, American actress (born 1926)
- 2012 – David Atkinson, Canadian actor and singer (born 1921)
- 2012 – Stan Mudenge, Zimbabwean historian and politician, Zimbabwean Minister of Foreign Affairs (born 1941)
- 2012 – Tom Stannage, Australian footballer, historian, and academic (born 1944)
- 2013 – John Cloudsley-Thompson, Pakistani-English commander (born 1921)
- 2013 – Ulric Cross, Trinidadian navigator, judge, and diplomat (born 1917)
- 2013 – Akira Miyoshi, Japanese composer (born 1933)
- 2013 – Diana Nasution, Indonesian singer (born 1958)
- 2013 – Võ Nguyên Giáp, Vietnamese general and politician, 3rd Minister of Defence for Vietnam (born 1911)
- 2013 – Nicholas Oresko, American sergeant, Medal of Honor recipient (born 1917)
- 2014 – Konrad Boehmer, German-Dutch composer and educator (born 1941)
- 2014 – Hugo Carvana, Brazilian actor, director, producer, and screenwriter (born 1937)
- 2014 – Fyodor Cherenkov, Russian footballer and manager (born 1959)
- 2014 – Jean-Claude Duvalier, Haitian politician, 41st President of Haiti (born 1951)
- 2015 – Dave Pike, American vibraphone player and songwriter (born 1938)
- 2015 – Edida Nageswara Rao, Indian director and producer (born 1934)
- 2015 – Neal Walk, American basketball player (born 1948)
- 2020 – Clark Middleton, American actor (born 1957)
- 2020 – Kenzō Takada, Japanese-French fashion designer (born 1939)
- 2022 – Loretta Lynn, American singer-songwriter and musician (born 1932)
- 2024 – Christopher Ciccone, American artist (born 1960)
- 2024 – Billy Shaw, American football player (born 1938)

== Holidays and observances ==
- Christian feast day:
  - Amun
  - Aurea of Paris
  - Francis of Assisi
    - Conclusion of Creationtide
  - Blessed Francis Xavier Seelos
  - Petronius of Bologna
  - October 4 (Eastern Orthodox liturgics)
- Feast of St Francis of Assisi patron saints of Italy.
- Cinnamon Roll Day (Sweden and Finland)
- Day of Peace and Reconciliation (Mozambique)
- Independence Day, celebrates the independence of Lesotho from the United Kingdom in 1966.
- The beginning of World Space Week (International)
- World Animal Day
