= Klaus Konrad =

Klaus Konrad may refer to:

- Klaus Konrad, a nom de plume of Charles Whiting (1926–2007), British novelist and historian
- Klaus Konrad (footballer), German footballer in 1975–76 Tennis Borussia Berlin season
- Klaus Konrad (politician) (1914–2006), German member of parliament

== See also ==
- Klaus Conrad, a German neurologist
