= Michael Zimmer =

Michael Zimmer may refer to:

- Michael Zimmer (academic), privacy and social media scholar
- Michael Zimmer (footballer) (born 1955), German footballer
- Mike Zimmer (born 1956), American football coach
