= Eugenio Calò =

Somali-Italian anti-fascist partisan

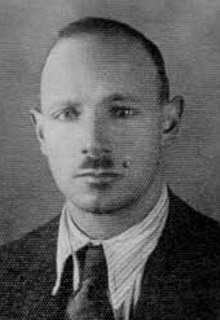
- Born: 2 July 1906; Pisa, Kingdom of Italy
- Died: 14 July 1944 (aged 38)
- Known for: Partisan
- Awards: Gold Medal of Military Valour

Eugenio Calò (July 2, 1906 – July 14, 1944) was an Italian Jewish resistance fighter during World War II. Born in Pisa to an old Sephardi family, he was posthumously awarded the Gold Medal for Military Valour, Italy's highest honor for heroism. Calò was an Italian partisan, second in command of the Pio Borri partisan division that fought the Germans in the Casentino mountains in Tuscany. As a Jewish victim of fascist Italy during the Second World War, Calò had lost his workshop, his home, and his family. Finally, at the age of 38, he was captured, tortured and murdered by the Germans.

== German occupation ==
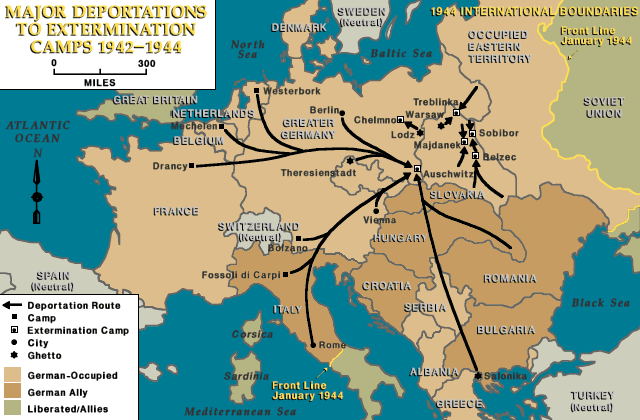
deported first to a concentration camp in Fossoli, and then on to Auschwitz.

After the German invasion in 1943, the anti-Semitic persecutions increased. The Fascists and the Germans began arresting the Jews and sending them to concentration camps. When Calò had learned about the capture of his family and the fact that they had been kept in Florence's Le Murate prison, he tried to organize their escape. His efforts were in vain. In May 1944 they were all deported to a concentration camp in Fossoli, and on the 16th of that month were sent on a transport to Auschwitz. His wife Carolina Lombroso gave birth to their fourth son while on the train. His family was killed by the Germans immediately upon arriving at Auschwitz.

Two months later, Calò and his fellow partisans captured a group of some thirty German soldiers. Acting on his moral authority as commander and as a human being, Calò opposed his fellow partisans who asked for a summary trial and execution of the prisoners. Instead, he insisted on treating the German soldiers as prisoners of war. He volunteered to take the prisoners across German lines, and extradite them to the hands of the allied forces. The Germans soldiers were notorious for their revenge and reprisal massacres of the civilian population. It was quite obvious to the partisans that if captured with German prisoners, they would be tortured and killed along with some innocent villagers. On July 2, 1944, the prisoners were transferred by Calò and other partisans - among them, Angelo Recapito and Luigi Valentini – to the Allied Headquarters in Cortona across the frontline.

General Mark Clark, commander of the US Fifth Army, asked for two volunteers who would take messages back to the partisans in order to coordinate their activities towards the liberation of the city of Arezzo which was planned for July 14. Calò and Angelo Recapito volunteered to go back and deliver the message. They succeeded in their mission and rejoined their friends, but were captured on July 14 along with a group of civilians and other partisans at Molin dei Falchi, where they had intended to spend the night with some more German prisoners. One of the German prisoners had managed to escape and informed the German Army and some Italian fascist collaborators of the camp's existence. The Germans attacked and there was a fierce battle in which many partisans died. The survivors were transferred to the village of San Polo di Arezzo where all the men of the village were collected as well for the reprisal action. The captured partisans were brutally tortured and murdered.

== San Polo massacre ==
After September 8, 1943, the German invasion army was ordered by the highest authorities not to follow the Geneva Convention or the normal rules of war, and show no mercy towards the civilian population. The German high command promised to give complete protection against all accusations of brutality. A specific order was issued to torture and kill everyone found with weapons and to terrorize the unarmed civilian population. For every German killed, ten Italian civilians were to be killed.

As per these commands, all the men of San Polo were gathered and brought to Villa Mancini where the German officers were quartered. There, the partisans were brutally beaten with rubber hoses and tortured. Eugenio Calò and Angelo Recapito, who both had information pertaining to the Allied forces' military plans, maintained their silence. At the end of the day, the partisans, wounded and barely alive, along with the captured men of the village — forty-eight in all — were taken to a nearby field on the backyard of Villa Gigliosi that the German soldiers had requisitioned. The civilians were made to dig three pit graves and were then thrown in still alive. The partisans were placed in the pits with their heads above ground and with explosive charges attached to their bodies. They were then blown apart. The Germans did not allow anyone to bury the dead.

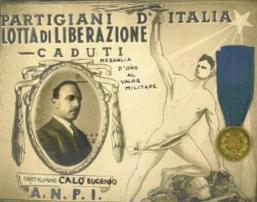
Certificate of the gold medal for Military Valour awarded to Eugenio Calò.

== Gold medal for military valour ==
Calò had spared the lives of some thirty captured German soldiers and insisted on acting in a humane way, even though his own family (his wife Carolina Lombroso, daughter Elena and sons Renzo and Albertino) had been captured and sent to Auschwitz only a couple of months earlier.

For his military activities against the Germans as a member of the Italian resistance movement, for his contribution as second in command of the Pio Borri partisan division that patrolled the Casentino mountains in Tuscany, for his bravery, and for his humanity, Eugenio Calò was awarded in 1947 the highest honor for military heroism in Italy, the "Gold Medal for Military Valour".

== Remembering Eugenio Calò ==
The San Polo massacre is commemorated every year, as is the liberation of Arezzo on July 16, 1944. The local religious, civilian and military authorities participate in the ceremony.

There are streets in Arezzo and Florence bearing the names of Eugenio Calò and Angelo Recapito and in the town of Quarata, near Arezzo, there is a school named after him.

The county of Reggello named the Cascia square in memory of Carolina Lombroso Calò, In May 2016 a plaque commemorating her memory and her deportation and murder in Auschwitz with her children, was set in the square.

== San Polo trials ==
Former NSDAP member Herbert Handsk, who took part in the San Polo massacre, was released from prison in 2007 by the Italian justice. Aged 87, he was the only survivor of the perpetrators of the massacre. Klaus Konrad had died on August 15, 2006. He had also been indicted by the magistrates in the same trial. Konrad, who became after the war a deputy of the Bundestag from 1969 to 1980 as a member of Willy Brandt's SPD, had already been indicted by the Italian justice in 1967 and 1972, but the complaints had been classified.

== See also ==
- Military history of Italy during World War II
- History of the Jews in Italy
- The British Eighth Army who liberated Arezzo on July 16, 1944
- The US Fifth Army that coordinated with the partisans at Cortona
- de:Klaus Konrad

== References and bibliography ==
- Original research by Eugenio Calo's nephew Tullio Sonnino and Shmulik Suhami.
- Fuochi sui Monti dell'Appennino Toscano:Antonio Curina; D. Badiali, Arezzo 1957.
- Arezzo distrutta 1943-44: Enzo Droandi; Calosci editore, Cortona, 1995.
