= Florence Allen =

Florence Allen may refer to:

- Florence E. Allen (1884–1966), American judge
- Florence Wysinger Allen (1913–1997), African American artists' model
- Flo Allen (footballer) (born 1999), English footballer
- Florence Eliza Allen (1876–1960), American mathematician and women's suffrage activist
