= Blaser (surname) =

Blaser or Bläser is a surname. Notable people with the surname include:

- Andrew Blaser (born 1989), American skeleton racer
- Cory Blaser (born 1981), American baseball umpire
- Gustav Bläser (1813–1874), German sculptor
- Josef Bläser (born 1952), German footballer
- Martin J. Blaser (born 1948), American academic
- Robert Blaser (born 1948), Swiss wrestler
- Robin Blaser (1925–2009), American author and poet
- Samuel Blaser (born 1981), Swiss trombonist and composer
- William L. Blaser (1923–2018), American businessman and politician
