= Jahnstadion =

Jahnstadion is the name of several stadiums in Germany, including:

- Jahnstadion (Bottrop), a stadium in Bottrop
- Jahnstadion (Göttingen), a stadium in Göttingen
- Friedrich-Ludwig-Jahn-Sportpark, a stadium in Berlin
- Friedrich-Ludwig-Jahn-Stadion, a stadium in Herford
- Jahnstadion Regensburg (1926), a stadium in Regensburg (defunct)
- Jahnstadion Regensburg, a stadium in Regensburg
- Jahnstadion, Rheda-Wiedenbrück, a stadium in Rheda-Wiedenbrück
- Jahnstadion (Rheine), a stadium in Rheine
- Jahnstadion (Mönchengladbach), a stadium in Mönchengladbach
- Jahnstadion (Marl), a stadium in Marl
- Jahnstadion (Neubrandenburg), a stadium in Neubrandenburg
- Jahnstadion (Neuss), a stadium in Neuss
