= Dustin Heun =

German former professional footballer (born 1984)

Personal information
- Full name: Dustin Heun
- Date of birth: 11 April 1984 (age 42)
- Place of birth: Duisburg, West Germany
- Height: 1.88 m (6 ft 2 in)
- Position: Forward

Team information
- Current team: LASK Linz (video analyst)

Youth career
- Turnerschaft Rahm 06
- MSV Duisburg
- 1999–2002: KFC Uerdingen 05

Senior career*
Years	Team	Apps	(Gls)
2002–2005	KFC Uerdingen 05	64	(16)
2005–2006	Eintracht Braunschweig	23	(0)
2006–2007	VfB Lübeck	43	(12)
2008–2009	Union Berlin	9	(3)
2009–2010	1. FC Kaiserslautern II	2	(0)
Total		141	(31)

Managerial career
- 2013–2017: VfL Wolfsburg II (video analyst)
- 2016–2017: VfL Wolfsburg (assistant)
- 2020–: LASK Linz (video analyst)
- * Club domestic league appearances and goals

Dustin Heun (born 11 April 1984) is a German former professional footballer who played as a forward.

Dustin's father, Dirk Heun, was also a professional footballer and made 10 appearances in the Bundesliga.

== Playing career ==
Heun, whose father Dirk Heun was active as a professional footballer for Tennis Borussia Berlin and Rot-Weiß Oberhausen, was born in Duisburg. He started his professional career with KFC Uerdingen 05. In his first Regionalliga season in 2002–03 he scored two goals in seven games.

After two more years at the KFC and 14 goals in 57 games, he moved to the 2. Bundesliga club Eintracht Braunschweig after KFC was relegated. He was used 23 times in his first season, mostly as a substituter for a few minutes. In the 2006–07 season he moved to Regionalliga club VfB Lübeck shortly before the end of the 2006 summer transfer market. Heun immediately became a regular player, scoring 12 goals in his first season. In addition, he scored the winning goal in the DFB Cup against TSV 1860 Munich.

During the winter break of 2007–08, Heun moved from Lübeck to league rivals 1. FC Union Berlin, where he initially had a promising start (with three goals in six games), but then failed due to injury for the rest of the second half of the season. In the rehabilitation phase, an appendix operation threw him back in June 2008. In September 2008 Heun was able to resume training with the third division team after a break of more than six months. On 18 March 2009, he celebrated his comeback game - after almost exactly a year break - against SV Wacker Burghausen. In May 2009 the sports management of 1. FC Union announced that the contract with Heun would end on 30 June 2009 and wouldn't be extended as originally planned.

In the 2009–10 season Heun was under contract with the 1. FC Kaiserslautern II. Due to persistent injury concerns, he ended his professional career after the season.

From summer 2012 to summer 2013, Heun played amateur football again, joining TSV Geitelde.

== Post-playing career ==
Heun became disabled in sports, completed a two-year retraining course, was an intern for video analysis with Lorenz-Günther Köstner, coach of the 2nd team at VfL Wolfsburg, from 2012, and worked as a scout and analyst at VfL U23 from 2015 under Valérien Ismaël and from November 2016 as video analyst for Ismael, who became the coach of the first team. In March 2017, he began working as a scout for VfL Wolfsburg again.

In January 2020, he followed Ismaël to Austrian club LASK Linz, again as a video analyst.
