= Hans-Joachim Wagner =

German footballer

Personal information
- Date of birth: January 31, 1955 (age 71)
- Position: Defender

Senior career*
| Years | Team | Apps | (Gls) |
| 1974–1983 | Borussia Dortmund | 221 | (9) |
| 1983–1984 | Rot-Weiss Essen | 9 | (1) |
- * Club domestic league appearances and goals as of 16:31, 28 February 2009 (UTC)

Hans-Joachim Wagner (born January 31, 1955) is a retired German football player. He spent 7 seasons in the Bundesliga with Borussia Dortmund. The best league finish he achieved was 6th place.
