= Herbert Mühlenberg =

German footballer

Personal information
- Date of birth: 23 April 1949 (age 77)
- Place of birth: Düren, Germany
- Height: 1.83 m (6 ft 0 in)
- Position: Forward

Senior career*
Years	Team	Apps	(Gls)
1967–1971	SC Jülich 1910		
1971–1972	1. FC Köln		
1973	Bayer Leverkusen		
1973–1978	VfL Osnabrück		
1978–1979	VfB Rheine		

Managerial career
- 1982–1991: Sportfreunde Oesede
- 1993–1995: VfL Osnabrück (junior)
- 1995–1997: VfL Osnabrück
- 1977–2000: VfL Osnabrück II
- * Club domestic league appearances and goals

Herbert Mühlenberg (born 23 April 1949) is a German former professional football player and manager, who played as a forward.
