= Kees Bregman =

Dutch retired footballer

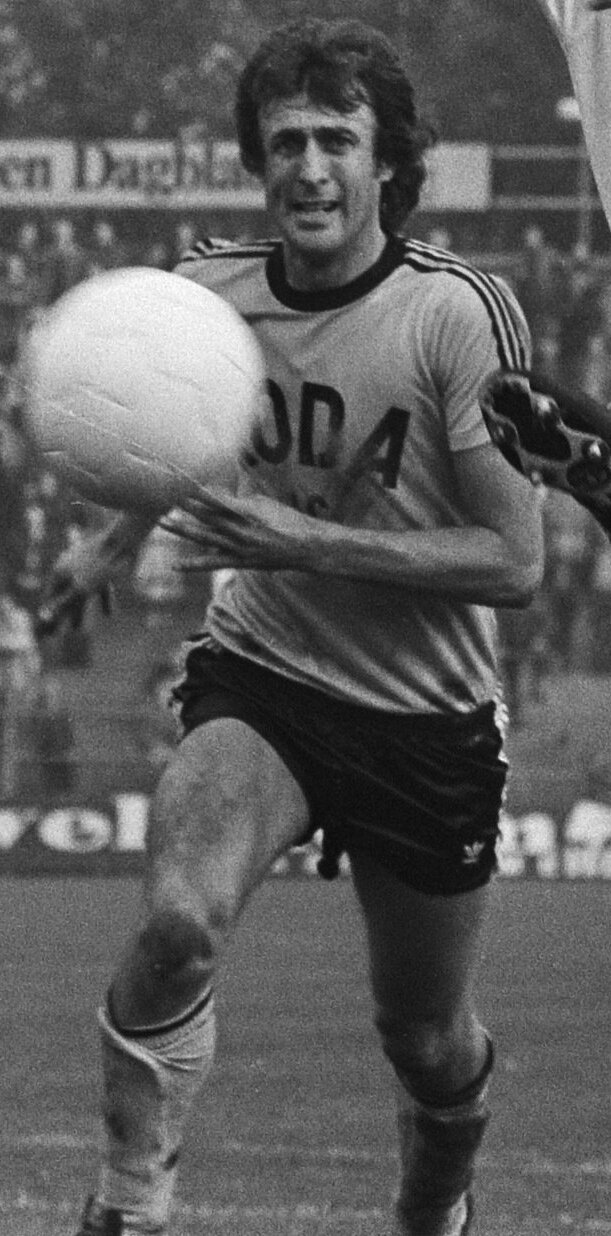
- Bregman playing for Roda JC in 1979

Personal information
- Date of birth: 8 August 1947 (age 79)
- Place of birth: Netherlands
- Positions: Defender; midfielder; forward

Senior career*
Years	Team	Apps	(Gls)
-1971	JOS		
1971–1972	Haarlem	30	(15)
1972–1974	FC Den Haag	56	(13)
1974–1979	MSV Duisburg	142	(6)
1979–1980	Roda JC	17	(0)
1980–1982	Arminia Bielefeld	60	(0)
1982–1984	MSV Duisburg	70	(1)
1984–1985	Fortuna Köln	15	(1)
1986	Mülheimer SV 07		
1988-1989	Rot-Weiß Oberhausen	0	(0)
Total		390	(36)
- * Club domestic league appearances and goals

Kees Bregman (born 8 August 1947 in the Netherlands) is a Dutch retired footballer.

He spent 10 years playing in the West German Bundesliga's.

== Personal life ==
In addition to his football career, Bregman also used to work as a hairdresser. In 1989, he was sentenced to 3,5 years in prison for cocaine dealing but was released after two years.
