= Wolfgang Mulack =

German footballer (born 1948)

Personal information
- Full name: Wolfgang Mulack
- Date of birth: 4 January 1948 (age 78)
- Place of birth: Germany
- Position: Defender

Senior career*
Years	Team	Apps	(Gls)
1973–1975	Tennis Borussia Berlin	22	(0)
Total		22	(0)
- * Club domestic league appearances and goals

Wolfgang Mulack (born 4 January 1948) is a former professional German footballer.

Mulack made 22 appearances in the Bundesliga for Tennis Borussia Berlin during his playing career.
