= Erhard Hofeditz =

German footballer (1953–2025)

Personal information
- Date of birth: 7 December 1953
- Place of birth: Wolfhagen, Hesse, West Germany
- Date of death: 20 February 2025 (aged 71)
- Height: 1.70 m (5 ft 7 in)
- Position: Striker

Senior career*
Years	Team	Apps	(Gls)
1976–1977	KSV Baunatal	47	(24)
1977–1980	1860 Munich	87	(22)
1980–1982	1. FC Kaiserslautern	55	(13)
1982–1983	Karlsruher SC	30	(4)
1983–1985	Kickers Offenbach	24	(10)
Total		243	(73)
- * Club domestic league appearances and goals

Erhard Hofeditz (7 December 1953 – 20 February 2025) was a German professional footballer who played as a striker. He died from cancer on 20 February 2025, at the age of 71.
