= Dirk Heun =

German footballer

Personal information
- Full name: Dirk Heun
- Date of birth: 4 January 1953 (age 73)
- Place of birth: Germany
- Position: Midfielder

Senior career*
Years	Team	Apps	(Gls)
1974–1975	Rot-Weiß Oberhausen	35	(4)
1975–1977	Tennis Borussia Berlin	25	(1)
Total		60	(5)
- * Club domestic league appearances and goals

Dirk Heun (born 4 January 1953) is a German former footballer who played as a midfielder.

Heun made ten appearances for Tennis Borussia Berlin during the 1976–77 Bundesliga campaign.

His son, Dustin Heun, is also a former professional footballer.
