= Florence Eliza Allen =

American mathematician (1876–1960)

- Born: October 4, 1876; Horicon, Wisconsin, US
- Died: December 31, 1960 (aged 84); Madison, Wisconsin, US
- Education: PhD in Geometry (1907) from the University of Wisconsin (Madison)
- Occupation: University of Wisconsin math instructor
- Years active: 1902–1947
- Known for: 2nd woman to receive a PhD in math at the University of Wisconsin

Florence Eliza Allen (1876–1960) was an American mathematician and women's suffrage activist. In 1907 she became the second woman to receive a Ph.D. in mathematics at the University of Wisconsin–Madison, and the fourth Ph.D. overall from that department.

== Early life ==
Florence Eliza Allen was born on October 4, 1876, in Horicon, Wisconsin, to Eliza and Charles Allen. Her father, a lawyer, died in 1890 when Allen was 14 years old. She had an older brother, Charles Allen, who was four years her senior and became a court reporter. Allen's mother died in 1913.

Raised in a Protestant household, Allen was an active member of the First Congregational Church in Madison, Wisconsin.

== Education ==
Allen's academic journey began at the University of Wisconsin-Madison, where she earned her undergraduate degree in mathematics in 1900. She was a distinguished student, inducted into Phi Beta Kappa, and participated in campus life, serving in leadership roles in a literary society promoting fine arts, as well as in the self-government association and the yearbook board. Allen continued her studies at the University of Wisconsin, obtaining her master's degree in 1901 with a thesis titled "The Abelian integrals of the first kind upon the Riemann’s surface $s=(z-a)^{\tfrac56}(z-b)^{\tfrac56}(z-c)^{\tfrac26}$."

== PhD and dissertation ==
In 1907, Allen made history by becoming the second woman, after Charlotte Elvira Pengra, to receive a PhD in mathematics from the University of Wisconsin-Madison. Her dissertation, titled "The Cyclic Involutions of Third Order Determined by Nets of Curves of Deficiency 0, 1, and 2," was supervised by Linnaeus Wayland Dowling and published in the Quarterly Journal of Mathematics in 1914. This accomplishment marked her as the fourth PhD graduate overall from the university's mathematics department.

“There will always be some women who should go in for a PhD. — some because it will be an actual necessity to qualify them for one of the occasional — very occasional — openings in college and university positions, some because of the leisure they may have to follow a congenial pursuit. But on the whole I see no great encouragement to be had from past experiences and observations. I do not believe that there is or will be a great future for any but a few in this field. At present, it seems to me, as I look about this campus, that in all strictly academic fields (not those special to women) that there is a decided drop in the number of women engaged.”

== Career ==
Following her doctorate, Allen remained at the University of Wisconsin, where she continued her academic career. Despite her significant contributions to the field, she faced challenges in professional advancement, possibly due to anti-nepotism policies, as her brother was a prominent faculty member in the university's botany department.

In 1945, after 43 years of service as an instructor, Allen was promoted to assistant professor, a position she held until her retirement in 1947. Her lengthy tenure at the university was marked by dedication to teaching and research. After her dissertation, her notable publications include:

- "A Certain Class of Transcendental Curves" (1915)
  - Published in the Rendiconti del Circolo Matematico di Palermo
- "Closure of the Tangential Process on the Rational Plane Cubic" (1927)
  - Published in the American Journal of Mathematics

Allen was an active member of the Wisconsin Academy of Sciences, Arts, and Letters and participated in various professional organizations, including the American Mathematical Society and the American Mathematical Association. Her contributions to the field were often not recognized, and according to anecdotal evidence, many of her students were unaware of her doctorate, referring to her simply as “Miss Allen.”

== Later life ==
Outside academia, Allen was listed in the 1914 “Woman’s Who’s Who of America,” where she expressed her support for women's suffrage.

Allen lived with her mother until 1913 when her mother died. Later, she either lived alone or shared her home with roommates. In her later years, she continued to be involved in her community and professional organizations.

On December 29, 1960, Florence Allen was admitted to the hospital in Madison, Wisconsin. Soon after, she died on December 31, 1960, at the age of 84 years old. She was buried in Oak Hill Cemetery in her hometown of Horicon, Wisconsin.

== See also ==
- Lillian Beecroft
- Vermillion Thisson

== Sources ==
- Green, Judy; LaDuke, Jeanne (2009). Pioneering Women in American Mathematics: The Pre-1940 PhD's. American Mathematical Society. ISBN 978-0-8218-4376-5. ProQuest 2148436019.
