= Michael Schuhmacher =

German footballer

Personal information
- Full name: Michael Schuhmacher
- Date of birth: 20 August 1957 (age 69)
- Place of birth: West Germany
- Height: 1.78 m (5 ft 10 in)
- Position: Defender

Senior career*
| Years | Team | Apps | (Gls) |
| 1978–80 | 1. FC Kaiserslautern | 24 | (2) |
| 1980–1981 | Borussia Mönchengladbach | 19 | (0) |
| 1981 | 1. FC Kaiserslautern | 2 | (0) |
| 1982–1983 | Bayer Uerdingen | 36 | (3) |
| 1983–1984 | SG Wattenscheid 09 | 28 | (1) |
| 1988–1993 | 1. FSV Mainz 05 | 141 | (9) |
- * Club domestic league appearances and goals

Michael Schuhmacher (born 20 August 1957) is a retired German football player.
