= Norbert Eilenfeldt =

German footballer

Personal information
- Date of birth: 17 February 1956 (age 70)
- Place of birth: Gelsenkirchen, West Germany
- Height: 1.74 m (5 ft 9 in)
- Position: Midfielder

Youth career
- 1962–1970: FC Karnap 07
- 1970–1974: Rot-Weiss Essen

Senior career*
Years	Team	Apps	(Gls)
1974–1976	1. FC Mülheim	68	(4)
1976–1981	Arminia Bielefeld	181	(78)
1981–1984	1. FC Kaiserslautern	102	(24)
1984–1985	→ Schalke 04 (loan)	17	(1)
1985–1986	1. FC Kaiserslautern	25	(1)
1986–1988	Arminia Bielefeld	51	(3)
- * Club domestic league appearances and goals

Norbert Eilenfeldt (born 17 February 1956) is a German retired professional footballer who played as a midfielder. He spent eight seasons in the Bundesliga with Arminia Bielefeld, 1. FC Kaiserslautern and Schalke 04. The best league finish he achieved was fourth place.
