= Manfred Tripbacher =

German footballer

Personal information
- Date of birth: 23 February 1957 (age 69)
- Place of birth: Augsburg, West Germany
- Height: 1.72 m (5 ft 7 1/2 in)
- Position: Midfielder

Senior career*
Years	Team	Apps	(Gls)
1976–1979	FC Augsburg	50	(6)
1979–1986	Eintracht Braunschweig	231	(28)
1986–	FC Augsburg		
- BC Harlekin Augsburg
- TSV Schwaben Augsburg

Managerial career
- TSV Schwaben Augsburg (player-manager)
- TSV Fischach
- * Club domestic league appearances and goals

Manfred Tripbacher (born 23 February 1957) is a retired German footballer.

== Career ==
Tripbacher started his senior career at his hometown club FC Augsburg in the 2. Bundesliga. After three seasons, he transferred to Bundesliga side Eintracht Braunschweig together with his manager at Augsburg, Werner Olk. He went on to spend six seasons in the Bundesliga, as well as two seasons in the 2. Bundesliga, with Braunschweig. In 1986 Tripbacher returned to Augsburg to play at the semi-pro and amateur level. During the late 1980s he joined BC Harlekin Augsburg, a club founded by an amusement arcade entrepreneur with the goal to take the team with former professional players like Tripbacher and Marinho Chagas from the lowest division to the Bundesliga. However, the plan was quickly given up, and Tripbacher continued as player and manager in the lower divisions of Bavarian football.
