= Rolf Grünther =

German footballer

Personal information
- Date of birth: 11 February 1951 (age 75)
- Place of birth: Kleinenbroich, West Germany
- Height: 1.85 m (6 ft 1 in)
- Position: Centre-back

Senior career*
Years	Team	Apps	(Gls)
1969–1972	VfR Neuss		
1972–1979	Preußen Münster		
1979–1981	1860 Munich		
1981–1985	Alemannia Aachen		

Managerial career
- 1984: Alemannia Aachen
- 1985: VfL Osnabrück (juniors)
- 1985–1987: VfL Osnabrück
- 1987–1989: Arminia Hannover
- 1989: Alemannia Aachen
- 1990–1991: VfL Osnabrück
- * Club domestic league appearances and goals

Rolf Grünther (born 11 February 1951) is a German former professional football player and manager, who played as a centre-back.
