= Joachim Thiel =

German footballer

Personal information
- Full name: Joachim Thiel
- Date of birth: 7 August 1951 (age 75)
- Place of birth: Germany
- Position: Defender

Senior career*
| Years | Team | Apps | (Gls) |
| 1970–1972 | SC Tasmania 1900 Berlin | | |
| 1973–1975 | Tennis Borussia Berlin | 22 | (0) |
| 1976–1979 | BFC Alemannia 90 Wacker | 41 | (0) |
| Total | | 63 | (0) |
- * Club domestic league appearances and goals

Joachim Thiel (born 7 August 1951) is a former professional German footballer.

Thiel made a total of 22 appearances in the Fußball-Bundesliga for Tennis Borussia Berlin during his playing career.
