= Reinhard Adler =

German footballer (1947–2025)

Personal information
- Date of birth: 9 February 1947
- Place of birth: Germany
- Date of death: 23 October 2025 (aged 78)
- Height: 1.83 m (6 ft 0 in)
- Position: Midfielder

Youth career
- RSV Seelze 51

Senior career*
Years	Team	Apps	(Gls)
1966–1970	SV Arminia Hannover		
1970–1972	KSV Hessen Kassel	64	(28)
1973–1975	Tennis Borussia Berlin	10	(0)
Total		74	(28)
- * Club domestic league appearances and goals

Reinhard Adler (9 February 1947 – 23 October 2025) was a German footballer who played as a midfielder. He played for KSV Hessen Kassel 64 times between 1970 and 1972 after coming from SV Arminia Hannover. In 1973, Adler moved to Tennis Borussia Berlin, where he made 10 Bundesliga appearances for the Veilchen. He died on 23 October 2025, at the age of 78.
