= Charlotte Elvira Pengra =

American mathematician (1875–1916)

- Born: May 30, 1875; Judah, Wisconsin
- Died: February 7, 1916 (aged 40); Brodhead, Wisconsin
- Other name: Charlotte Pengra Crathorne
- Occupation: mathematician
- Spouse: Arthur Robert Crathorne (1873–1946)
- Children: Three
- Parents: Winfield Sherman Pengra (father); Mary Ellen Preston (mother)

Charlotte Elvira Pengra (born May 30, 1875, in Judah, Wisconsin, died February 7, 1916, in Brodhead, Wisconsin) was an American mathematician. In 1901, she became the third person to receive a Ph.D. in math at the University of Wisconsin, and the sixth American woman to receive a doctorate in mathematics.

== Biography ==
Pengra was the eldest of five children born to Wisconsin farmer and landlord Winfield Sherman Pengra and Mary Ellen (Preston). All five of the couple's children went on to earn a University of Wisconsin bachelor's degree in nearby Madison.

Charlotte received her Bachelor of Arts degree in mathematics from the university in 1897, which, like the degrees of most female graduates of that time, qualified her to teach math at secondary schools. For two years she taught at Wisconsin high schools in Fox Lake and Sparta.

After winning a fellowship in 1899, she was able to return to the University of Wisconsin-Madison to advance her studies there. She earned her doctorate two years later, in 1901, under the direction of Linnaeus Wayland Dowling. Her 23-page doctoral thesis, about the conformal representation of plane curves, was titled On Functions Connected with Special Riemann Surfaces, In Particular Those For Which P Equals 3, 4, and 5.

After receiving her doctorate, Pengra moved to Elgin, Illinois where, for three years, she served as supervisor of a high school mathematics department.

On June 21, 1904, she married fellow math student Arthur Robert Crathorne (1873–1946). They had met while she pursued her doctoral studies at Wisconsin. After their marriage, the Crathorne's traveled to Göttingen, Germany where Arthur earned his Ph.D. in mathematics in 1907. The first of their three children, a daughter, was born November 1906 in Germany and the other two children were born in 1909 and 1911 after the family's return to the U.S.

The young family settled in Illinois where Arthur took a faculty position at the University of Illinois.

Charlotte Pengra Crathorne died in 1916 of breast cancer in Brodhead, Wisconsin at the age of 40.

== Publications ==
Charlotte's dissertation has been published in multiple editions.

- On Functions Connected with Special Riemann Surfaces, In Particular Those For Which P Equals 3, 4, and 5, Ph.D. dissertation. https://books.google.com/books?id=2gpNAAAAMAAJ&q=charlotte+pengra
- Pengra, Charlotte Elvira. On the Conformal Representation of Plane Curves Particularly for the Cases P = 4, 5, and 6. United States, Fb&c Limited, 2015 edition. https://books.google.com/books?id=u2TkswEACAAJ
