= Jürgen Rumor =

German footballer

Personal information
- Full name: Jürgen Rumor
- Date of birth: 19 February 1945 (age 81)
- Place of birth: Germany
- Height: 1.78 m (5 ft 10 in)
- Position: Defender

Youth career
- –1964: 1. FC Köln

Senior career*
Years	Team	Apps	(Gls)
1964–1968	1. FC Köln	56	(1)
1968–1970	1. FC Kaiserslautern	63	(3)
1970–1972	Hertha BSC	28	(0)
1974–1975	Tennis Borussia Berlin	16	(6)
Total		162	(10)

International career
	Germany U-23	1	(0)
- * Club domestic league appearances and goals

Jürgen Rumor (born 19 February 1945) is a former professional German footballer.

Rumor started his footballing career at 1. FC Köln, where he made 56 Fußball-Bundesliga appearances before moving to 1. FC Kaiserslautern. After 63 games, Rumor transferred to Hertha BSC. As a Hertha player, Rumor was implicated in the 1971 Bundesliga scandal and was accused of accepting a bribe to fix a match. On 23 January 1972, Rumor was fined 15,000 Deutsche Mark and given a lifelong ban from football by the German Football Association. He was later granted an amnesty and played a further 16 Bundesliga games for Tennis Borussia Berlin during the 1974–75 season.

== See also ==
- Bundesliga scandal (1971)
