= Werner Melzer =

German footballer and coach

Personal information
- Date of birth: 2 May 1954 (age 72)
- Place of birth: Clausen, West Germany
- Height: 1.78 m (5 ft 10 in)
- Positions: Midfielder; defender

Senior career*
Years	Team	Apps	(Gls)
1973–1974	FK Clausen		
1974–1986	1. FC Kaiserslautern	374	(31)

Managerial career
- 1. FC Kaiserslautern II
- 1. FC Saarbrücken (assistant)
- 2003–2006: Hamburger SV (assistant)
- * Club domestic league appearances and goals

Werner Melzer (born 2 May 1954) is a German football coach and a former player. He spent 12 seasons in the Bundesliga with 1. FC Kaiserslautern. He holds the record for most appearances in the Bundesliga for 1. FC Kaiserslautern with 374 games played.

== Honours ==
- DFB-Pokal finalist: 1975–76, 1980–81
