= Michael Dusek =

German footballer and coach (1958–2023)

Personal information
- Date of birth: 10 November 1958
- Place of birth: Niederwörresbach, Rhineland-Palatinate, West Germany
- Date of death: 14 July 2023 (aged 64)
- Height: 1.85 m (6 ft 1 in)
- Position: Defender

Senior career*
Years	Team	Apps	(Gls)
1979–1988	1. FC Kaiserslautern	210	(10)

Managerial career
- 1988–1991: SV Niederwörresbach
- 1991–1994: TuS Tiefenstein
- 1994–1996: SV Wittlich
- 1996–1999: SC Idar-Oberstein
- 1999–2001: 1. FC Kaiserslautern II
- 2001–2007: 1. FC Kaiserslautern (youth team supervisor)
- 2007–2011: SC Idar-Oberstein
- 2011–2012: FK Pirmasens
- * Club domestic league appearances and goals

Michael Dusek (10 November 1958 – 14 July 2023) was a German football coach and a player. As a player, he spent nine seasons in the Bundesliga with 1. FC Kaiserslautern.

Dusek died of cancer on 14 July 2023, at the age of 64.

== Honours ==
1. FC Kaiserslautern

- DFB-Pokal finalist: 1980–81
