= Manfred Wittke =

German footballer

Personal information
- Full name: Manfred Wittke
- Date of birth: 2 January 1953 (age 73)
- Place of birth: Germany
- Position: Goalkeeper

Senior career*
Years	Team	Apps	(Gls)
1974–1975	Tennis Borussia Berlin	7	(0)
Total		7	(0)
- * Club domestic league appearances and goals

Manfred Wittke (born 2 January 1953) is a former professional German footballer.

Wittke made a total of 2 appearances in the Fußball-Bundesliga and 5 in the 2. Bundesliga during his playing career.
