= Josef Bläser =

German footballer

Personal information
- Date of birth: 11 December 1952 (age 73)
- Height: 1.76 m (5 ft 9 in)
- Position: Defender

Youth career
- –1971: 1. FC Köln

Senior career*
| Years | Team | Apps | (Gls) |
| 1971–1974 | 1. FC Köln | 21 | (1) |
| 1974–1979 | Alemannia Aachen | 148 | (14) |
| 1979–1982 | Linzer ASK | 75 | (0) |
- * Club domestic league appearances and goals

Josef Bläser (born 11 December 1952) is a former German footballer.

For three years, Bläser played in the 1. Bundesliga with 1. FC Köln. However, during this time he only made 21 appearances, before moving to Alemannia Aachen in the 2. Bundesliga, where he could assure himself a regular slot in the first team.
