= Jürgen Schulz (footballer) =

German footballer

Personal information
- Full name: Jürgen Schulz
- Date of birth: 6 October 1952 (age 74)
- Place of birth: Germany
- Position: Midfielder

Senior career*
Years	Team	Apps	(Gls)
1971–1972	SC Tasmania 1900 Berlin		
1973–1981	Tennis Borussia Berlin	244	(16)
1983–1984	SCC Berlin	36	(0)
Total		280	(16)
- * Club domestic league appearances and goals

Jürgen Schulz (born 6 October 1952) is a retired German footballer.

Schulz played a record 244 games (67 of which in the Fußball-Bundesliga) for Tennis Borussia Berlin between 1973 and 1981, scoring 16 goals.
