= Karlheinz Subklewe =

German footballer

Personal information
- Full name: Karlheinz Subklewe
- Date of birth: 6 December 1950 (age 75)
- Place of birth: Germany
- Position: Striker

Senior career*
Years	Team	Apps	(Gls)
1973–1977	Tennis Borussia Berlin	81	(10)
1977–1981	FC 08 Homburg	82	(10)
Total		163	(20)
- * Club domestic league appearances and goals

Karlheinz Subklewe (born 6 December 1950) is a former German footballer.

== Career ==
Subklewe made a total of 42 appearances in the Fußball-Bundesliga and 121 in the 2. Bundesliga during his playing career.
