= Peter Eggert =

German footballer and manager

Personal information
- Full name: Peter Eggert
- Date of birth: 8 June 1943
- Place of birth: Berlin, German Reich
- Date of death: 24 May 2018 (aged 74)
- Place of death: Berlin, Germany
- Height: 1.84 m (6 ft 0 in)
- Position: Defender

Youth career
- –1963: Lauenburger SV

Senior career*
Years	Team	Apps	(Gls)
1964–1977	Tennis Borussia Berlin	57	(3)
Total		57	(3)

Managerial career
- 1980: Tennis Borussia Berlin
- 1981: Tennis Borussia Berlin
- * Club domestic league appearances and goals

Peter Eggert (8 June 1943 – 24 May 2018) is a former German football player and manager.

Eggert played his entire career for Tennis Borussia Berlin, making a total of 57 professional appearances and scoring three goals. After his playing career he twice took over the managerial reins on an interim basis for the club.
