= Gerd Schwidrowski =

German footballer

Personal information
- Full name: Gerd Schwidrowski
- Date of birth: 19 September 1947 (age 79)
- Place of birth: Rendsburg, Germany
- Position: Midfielder

Senior career*
Years	Team	Apps	(Gls)
–1970	MSV Duisburg	0	(0)
1970–1977	Tennis Borussia Berlin	11	(1)
- * Club domestic league appearances and goals

Gerd Schwidrowski (born 19 September 1947 in Rendsburg) is a former professional German footballer.

Schwidrowski made a total of 9 appearances in the Fußball-Bundesliga for Tennis Borussia Berlin during his playing career.
