= Hans Sprenger =

German footballer

Personal information
- Full name: Hans Sprenger
- Date of birth: 12 October 1948 (age 78)
- Place of birth: Germany
- Position: Defender

Senior career*
Years	Team	Apps	(Gls)
1972–1973	SC Wacker 04 Berlin		
1973–1979	Tennis Borussia Berlin	145	(8)
- * Club domestic league appearances and goals

Hans Sprenger (born 12 October 1948) is a retired German footballer.

Sprenger made his Fußball-Bundesliga debut on 24 August 1974 for Tennis Borussia Berlin in a 5–0 away loss to Eintracht Braunschweig. He went on to make 145 appearances in total for TeBe, 52 of which were in the Bundesliga.
