= Werner Novak =

German footballer

Personal information
- Full name: Werner Novak
- Date of birth: 31 July 1951 (age 75)
- Place of birth: Hersfeld-Rotenburg, West Germany
- Position: Defender

Senior career*
| Years | Team | Apps | (Gls) |
| 1971–1972 | 1. FV Bebra | | |
| 1972–1974 | KSV Hessen Kassel | 48 | (1) |
| 1974–1976 | Tennis Borussia Berlin | 10 | (0) |
| Total | | 58 | (1) |
- * Club domestic league appearances and goals

Werner Novak (born 31 July 1951 in Hersfeld-Rotenburg) is a former professional German footballer.

Novak made four appearances in the Bundesliga for Tennis Borussia Berlin during his playing career. His career was short-lived because he was injured in a friendly match against Everton due to a challenge by Bob Latchford, which caused Novak to end his footballing career.
