= Stephan Hoffmann =

German footballer

Personal information
- Full name: Stephan Hoffmann
- Date of birth: 9 August 1950
- Place of birth: Germany
- Position: Defender

Senior career*
Years	Team	Apps	(Gls)
1973–1976	Tennis Borussia Berlin	18	(0)
Total		18	(0)
- * Club domestic league appearances and goals

Stephan Hoffmann (9 August 1950 – ?) was a professional German footballer.

Hoffmann made 17 appearances in the Bundesliga and one appearance in the 2. Bundesliga for Tennis Borussia Berlin during his playing career.
