= Klaus Konrad (politician) =

German politician (1914–2006)

Klaus Konrad (22 December 1914 - 15 August 2006) was a deputy of the German Bundestag from 1969 to 1980 as a member of Willy Brandt's SPD. In 1967 and 1972 he was indicted in Italy for war crimes but the complaints had been classified.
