= Albert Bittlmayer =

German footballer

Personal information
- Full name: Albert Bittlmayer
- Date of birth: 8 November 1952
- Place of birth: West Germany
- Date of death: 2 June 1977 (aged 24)
- Place of death: West Germany
- Position: Striker

Senior career*
Years	Team	Apps	(Gls)
1971–1974	1. FC Nürnberg	93	(15)
1974–1976	Tennis Borussia Berlin	49	(16)
Total		142	(31)
- * Club domestic league appearances and goals

Albert Bittlmayer (8 November 1952 – 2 June 1977) was a German footballer who made a combined total of 142 league appearances for 1. FC Nürnberg and Tennis Borussia Berlin until he died of cancer at the age of 24.
