= Dietmar Mürdter =

German footballer

Personal information
- Full name: Dietmar Mürdter
- Date of birth: 4 October 1943 (age 83)
- Place of birth: Danzig, German Reich
- Position: Striker

Senior career*
Years	Team	Apps	(Gls)
1964–1967	1. SC Göttingen 05		
1967–1968	1. FC Köln	2	(0)
1968–1969	Bayer 04 Leverkusen		
1974–1975	Tennis Borussia Berlin	0	(0)
- * Club domestic league appearances and goals

Dietmar Mürdter (born 4 October 1943 in Danzig) is a former professional German footballer.

Mürdter made two appearances in the Bundesliga during his playing career.
