= Gino Ferrin =

German footballer and manager

Personal information
- Full name: Gino Ferrin
- Date of birth: 15 March 1947 (age 79)
- Place of birth: Berlin, Germany
- Positions: Defender; midfielder

Youth career
- SV Schöneberg

Senior career*
Years	Team	Apps	(Gls)
–1969	BFC Südring		
1969–1975	Tennis Borussia Berlin	6	(0)
1975–1979	FC St. Pauli	76	(2)
Total		82	(2)

Managerial career
- 1990–1992: Hertha Zehlendorf
- 1997: Hertha Zehlendorf
- * Club domestic league appearances and goals

Gino Ferrin (born 15 March 1947 in Berlin) is a German retired football manager and player.

Ferrin made a total of ten appearances in the Bundesliga during his career for Tennis Borussia Berlin and FC St. Pauli; he also played in a further 72 2. Bundesliga games.
