= Wilfried Hilker =

German football referee (1930–2025)

- Full name: Wilfried Hilker
- Born: 14 August 1930; Ahlen, German Reich
- Died: 3 April 2025 (aged 94); Bad Neuenahr, Germany
- Other occupation: Engineer

Domestic
Years	League	Role
1964–1978	Bundesliga	Referee

Wilfried Hilker (14 August 1930 – 3 April 2025) was a football referee from Germany.

Hilker was a referee for the German Football Association between 1964 and 1978. He refereed 81 games in the Fußball-Bundesliga and 36 games in the 2. Fußball-Bundesliga in this time and was also in charge of two international matches, five European Cup games and six games in Turkey and Greece.

During his career, Bochum-based Hilker only ever produced the red card twice, though he is remembered as the first referee in the Bundesliga to show the newly adopted red card to Friedel Lutz in a match between Eintracht Frankfurt and Eintracht Braunschweig on 3 April 1971.

Hilker died on 3 April 2025 in Bad Neuenahr, where he moved to from Bochum five years before his death. He was 94.
