= Michael Zimmer (footballer) =

German footballer

Personal information
- Full name: Michael Zimmer
- Date of birth: 18 November 1955 (age 70)
- Place of birth: Räckelwitz, Germany
- Position: Midfielder

Senior career*
Years	Team	Apps	(Gls)
1975–1978	Tennis Borussia Berlin	47	(2)
Total		47	(2)
- * Club domestic league appearances and goals

Michael Zimmer (born 18 November 1955) is a former professional German footballer.

Zimmer made a total of 21 appearances in the Fußball-Bundesliga and 26 in the 2. Bundesliga for Tennis Borussia Berlin during his playing career.
