= Klaus-Dieter Jank =

German footballer

Personal information
- Date of birth: 23 November 1952 (age 73)
- Place of birth: Waiblingen, West Germany
- Height: 1.70 m (5 ft 7 in)
- Position: Striker

Senior career*
Years	Team	Apps	(Gls)
1973–1975	VfB Stuttgart	24	(0)
1975–1976	Preußen Münster	24	(4)
1976–1980	VfB Stuttgart	58	(10)
1980–1982	Werder Bremen	25	(0)
1982	South China	15	(3)
1982–1983	Stuttgarter Kickers	13	(0)
1983–1984	Stade Lavallois	18	(1)
Total		177	(18)
- * Club domestic league appearances and goals

Klaus-Dieter Jank (born 23 November 1952) is a German former professional footballer who played as a striker.
