= Norbert Siegmann =

German footballer

Personal information
- Date of birth: 20 May 1953 (age 73)
- Height: 1.78 m (5 ft 10 in)
- Positions: Defender; midfielder

Senior career*
Years	Team	Apps	(Gls)
1970–1971	Wacker 04 Berlin		
1971–1972	SC Tasmania 1900 Berlin		
1972–1974	VfB Stuttgart	28	(0)
1974–1976	Tennis Borussia Berlin	65	(4)
1976–1985	Werder Bremen	193	(14)
1986	Fortuna Köln	2	(0)
- * Club domestic league appearances and goals

Norbert Siegmann (born 20 May 1953) is a German former professional footballer who played as a defender or midfielder. He spent 11 seasons in the Bundesliga with VfB Stuttgart, Tennis Borussia Berlin and SV Werder Bremen. He is probably best known for seriously injuring Ewald Lienen in 1981. That foul was called "the best-known foul in the history of the Bundesliga".

== Honours ==
Werder Bremen

- Bundesliga runner-up: 1983, 1985
