= Jahnstadion (Mönchengladbach) =

Football stadium in Mönchengladbach, Germany

Coordinates: 51°10′28.8″N 6°27′04.6″E

- Interactive map of Jahnstadion
- Full name: Jahnstadion
- Location: Mönchengladbach, Germany
- Owner: Rheydter Spielverein
- Operator: Rheydter Spielverein
- Capacity: 40,000 (record); 20,000 (current)

Construction
- Opened: September 22, 1922

Tenant
- Rheydter Spielverein

Jahnstadion is a multi-use stadium in Mönchengladbach, Germany . It is used as the stadium of Rheydter Spielverein matches. The capacity of the stadium is 20,000 spectators.
