= Rolf Dohmen =

German football coach and former player

Personal information
- Date of birth: 4 April 1952 (age 74)
- Place of birth: Kreuzau, West Germany
- Position: Defender

Team information
- Current team: Dynamo Dresden (General manager)

Senior career*
Years	Team	Apps	(Gls)
1975–1977	SC Fortuna Köln	72	(8)
1978–1982	Karlsruher SC	141	(7)
1982–1985	SV Darmstadt 98	94	(7)

Managerial career
- 2001: Eintracht Frankfurt
- 2002–2009: Karlsruher SC (GM)
- * Club domestic league appearances and goals

Rolf Dohmen (born 4 April 1952 in Kreuzau) is a German football coach and former player who last worked as a general manager (non-coaching role) for Karlsruher SC.
