= Peter Geyer =

German footballer

Personal information
- Full name: Peter Geyer
- Date of birth: 11 December 1952 (age 73)
- Place of birth: Nuremberg, West Germany
- Height: 1.79 m (5 ft 10 1/2 in)
- Position: Striker

Senior career*
Years	Team	Apps	(Gls)
1971–1974	1. FC Nürnberg	55	(7)
1974–1975	Tennis Borussia Berlin	33	(6)
1975–1981	Borussia Dortmund	196	(38)
1981–1984	Eintracht Braunschweig	64	(10)
1984–1987	Sportfreunde Siegen		
1987–1989	TuS Warstein		
Total		348	(61)

International career
1977–1979	West Germany B	7	(0)
- * Club domestic league appearances and goals

Peter Geyer (born 11 December 1952 in Nuremberg) is a retired German football player. He spent nine seasons in the Bundesliga with Tennis Borussia Berlin, Borussia Dortmund and Eintracht Braunschweig. The best league result he achieved was sixth place.
