= 1976–77 Tennis Borussia Berlin season =

Tennis Borussia Berlin
1976–77 season
- Manager: Rudi Gutendorf
- Stadium: Mommsenstadion (12), Olympiastadion (5)
- Bundesliga: 17th (relegated)
- DFB-Pokal: Third Round
- Top goalscorer: League: Benny Wendt (20); All: Benny Wendt (22)
- Highest home attendance: 42,000 (vs. Hertha BSC)
- Lowest home attendance: 4,000 (vs. 1. FC Kaiserslautern)
- Average home league attendance: 16,968

The 1976–77 season was the second occasion on which Tennis Borussia Berlin played in the Bundesliga, the highest tier of the German football league system. After 34 league games, Tennis Borussia ended up in 17th position as they had done two seasons previously. Second from the bottom of the table, they only finished one place above Rot-Weiss Essen due to a better goal difference. As in the previous season, the club reached the third round of the DFB-Pokal; this time losing 5–1 away to the season's eventual cup winners 1. FC Köln. Swedish striker Benny Wendt scored 20 of the club's 47 league goals.

== 1976–77 Tennis Borussia Berlin squad ==
No.	Pos.	Nation	Player
—	GK	FRG	Hubert Birkenmeier
—	GK	FRG	Volkmar Groß
—	DF	FRG	Hans-Jürgen Baake
—	DF	FRG	Peter Eggert
—	DF	FRG	Klaus-Peter Hanisch
—	DF	FRG	Dieter Hochheimer (from 1 December 1976)
—	DF	FRG	Stephan Hoffmann
—	DF	FRG	Hans-Georg Kraus
—	DF	FRG	Ernst Savkovic
—	DF	FRG	Reinhard Schmitz
—	DF	FRG	Hans Sprenger
—	MF	FRG	Winfried Berkemeier
—	MF	FRG	Dirk Heun

No.	Pos.	Nation	Player
—	MF	FRG	Ditmar Jakobs
—	MF	FRG	Lothar Schneider
—	MF	FRG	Jürgen Schulz
—	MF	FRG	Gerd Schwidrowski
—	MF	FRG	Michael Zimmer
—	FW	FRG	Albert Bittlmayer (until 2 June 1977)
—	FW	FRG	Detlef Bruckhoff
—	FW	FRG	Christian Sackewitz (until 20 November 1976)
—	FW	FRG	Klaus-Günter Stade
—	FW	FRG	Winfried Stradt (from 1 November 1976)
—	FW	FRG	Karlheinz Subklewe
—	FW	SWE	Benny Wendt

== 1976–77 fixtures ==
6 August 1976 DFB-Pokal – R1	Tennis Borussia Berlin	5–0	SC Sparta Bremerhaven	Mommsenstadion, Berlin
	Kraus 4'; Hanisch 9'; Schmitz 50'; Jakobs 83'; Sackewitz 85' (pen.)	Report		Attendance: 1,200; Referee: Volker Roth (Salzgitter)

14 August 1976 Bundesliga	Tennis Borussia Berlin	2–2	Rot-Weiss Essen	Olympiastadion, Berlin
15:30	Wendt 13', 55'	Report	Dörre 22'; Hrubesch 74'	Attendance: 22,000; Referee: Walter Niemann (Hamburg)

21 August 1976 Bundesliga	Eintracht Frankfurt	7–1	Tennis Borussia Berlin	Waldstadion, Frankfurt
15:30	Hölzenbein 14', 53' (pen.), 71'; Nickel 31'; Kraus 37', 79'; Grabowski 54'; Hölzenbein (yellow card)	Report	Berkemeier 61'; Jakobs (yellow card)	Attendance: 12,000; Referee: Walter Eschweiler (Euskirchen)

28 August 1976 Bundesliga	Tennis Borussia Berlin	4–2	Fortuna Düsseldorf	Mommsenstadion, Berlin
15:30	Wendt 5', 33', 68', 78'	Report	Brei 35' (pen.); Geye 51'; Baltes (yellow card) Schmitz (yellow card) Köhnen (yellow card)	Attendance: 10,000; Referee: Jürgen Meßmer (Mannheim)

3 September 1976 Bundesliga	Eintracht Braunschweig	3–1	Tennis Borussia Berlin	Eintracht-Stadion, Braunschweig
20:00	Dremmler 37'; Frank 38'; Popivoda 85'	Report	Wendt 54'	Attendance: 24,000; Referee: Manfred Wichmann (Gelsenkirchen)

10 September 1976 Bundesliga	FC Bayern München	9–0	Tennis Borussia Berlin	Olympiastadion, Munich
20:00	Kapellmann 23'; Rummenigge 30', 77', 89'; Müller 35', 39', 48', 57', 85'; Schwarzenbeck (yellow card)	Report		Attendance: 15,000; Referee: Heinz Quindeau (Ludwigshafen)

18 September 1976 Bundesliga	Tennis Borussia Berlin	3–2	1. FC Köln	Mommsenstadion, Berlin
15:30	Wendt 2'; Schulz 13'; Subklewe 55'; Kraus (yellow card)	Report	Löhr 87'; Müller 90'; Van Gool (yellow card)	Attendance: 18,454; Referee: Herbert Lutz (Bremen)

25 September 1976 Bundesliga	FC Schalke 04	5–4	Tennis Borussia Berlin	Parkstadion, Gelsenkirchen
15:30	Kremers 19'; Schulz 33' (o.g.); Fischer 33', 57'; Oblak 70'	Report	Schneider 44', 52'; Subklewe 54' (yellow card); Wendt 63' (yellow card); Kraus (yellow card) Sackewitz (yellow card)	Attendance: 17,000; Referee: Manfred Dölfel (Fürth)

2 October 1976 Bundesliga	Tennis Borussia Berlin	1–1	Hamburger SV	Olympiastadion, Berlin
15:30	Wendt 57' (pen.); Kraus (yellow card) Sackewitz (yellow card) Schneider (yellow card)	Report	Eigl 67'	Attendance: 37,500; Referee: Werner Burgers (Essen)

9 October 1976 Bundesliga	1. FC Saarbrücken	0–0	Tennis Borussia Berlin	Ludwigsparkstadion, Saarbrücken
15:30		Report	Kraus (yellow card) Schmitz (yellow card)	Attendance: 25,000; Referee: Gerd Hennig (Duisburg)

16 October 1976 DFB-Pokal – R2	Tennis Borussia Berlin	4–4 (a.e.t.)	FC Olympia Bocholt 1911	Mommsenstadion, Berlin
	Wendt 63'; Subklewe 72'; Schmitz 83', 99'	Report	Sprenger 43', 65', 95'; Brings 86'	Attendance: 1,200; Referee: Walter Niemann (Hamburg)

23 October 1976 Bundesliga	Tennis Borussia Berlin	4–2	Karlsruher SC	Olympiastadion, Berlin
15:30	Wendt 7', 37'; Schmitz 42'; Schneider 90'; Kraus (yellow card)	Report	Krauth 58'; Janzon 62'	Attendance: 17,000; Referee: Jan Redelfs (Hanover)

29 October 1976 Bundesliga	Borussia Mönchengladbach	3–0	Tennis Borussia Berlin	Bökelbergstadion, Mönchengladbach
20:00	Heynckes 45', 48'; Stielike 73'; Stielike (yellow card)	Report	Jakobs (yellow card) Kraus (yellow card) Schmitz (yellow card)	Attendance: 20,300; Referee: Theo Antz (Wahlen)

6 November 1976 Bundesliga	Tennis Borussia Berlin	1–5	MSV Duisburg	Mommsenstadion, Berlin
15:30	Zimmer 50'; Savkovic (yellow card)	Report	Büssers 9', 12', 29'; Worm 25', 90'; Pirsig (yellow card)	Attendance: 15,000; Referee: Klaus Ohmsen (Hamburg)

13 November 1976 Bundesliga	Hertha BSC	2–0	Tennis Borussia Berlin	Olympiastadion, Berlin
15:30	Hermandung 49'; Beer 73'; Diefenbach (yellow card) Horr (yellow card)	Report	Sackewitz (yellow card) Schmitz (yellow card) Wendt (yellow card)	Attendance: 74,762; Referee: Wilfried Hilker (Bochum)

17 November 1976 DFB-Pokal – R2; Replay	FC Olympia Bocholt 1911	1–1 (a.e.t.) (1–3 p)	Tennis Borussia Berlin	Stadion am Hünting, Bocholt
	Odendahl 84'; Korbel (yellow card)	Report	Wendt 63' (yellow card)	Attendance: 12,000; Referee: Volker Roth (Salzgitter)
	Penalties
	Odendahl (penalty scored)		(penalty scored) Sackewitz; (penalty scored) Jakobs; (penalty scored) Schneider

20 November 1976 Bundesliga	Tennis Borussia Berlin	1–1	VfL Bochum	Mommsenstadion, Berlin
15:30	Wendt 78' (yellow card)	Report	Kaczor 20'; Trimhold (yellow card)	Attendance: 9,500; Referee: Walter Horstmann (Hildesheim)

27 November 1976 Bundesliga	Borussia Dortmund	4–0	Tennis Borussia Berlin	Westfalenstadion, Dortmund
15:30	Vöge 14'; Burgsmüller 45'; Hartl 60'; Huber 78' (yellow card)	Report	Savkovic (yellow card) Schneider (yellow card) Wendt (yellow card)	Attendance: 28,500; Referee: Günter Linn (Altendiez)

4 December 1976 Bundesliga	Tennis Borussia Berlin	2–4	SV Werder Bremen	Mommsenstadion, Berlin
15:30	Subklewe 39'; Schulz 44'	Report	Siegmann 6', 79'; Görts 47'; Kamp 76'	Attendance: 8,000; Referee: Walter Eschweiler (Euskirchen)

11 December 1976 Bundesliga	1. FC Kaiserslautern	3–1	Tennis Borussia Berlin	Fritz-Walter-Stadion, Kaiserslautern
15:30	Pirrung 1', 80'; Toppmöller 89'; Scheller (yellow card)	Report	Wendt 26'; Baake (yellow card) Berkemeier (yellow card)	Attendance: 8,500; Referee: Wolf-Dieter Ahlenfelder (Oberhausen)

15 December 1976 DFB-Pokal – R3	1. FC Köln	5–1	Tennis Borussia Berlin	Müngersdorfer Stadion, Cologne
	Müller 3'; Flohe 17' (pen.); Van Gool 34'; Löhr 60'; Neumann 81'; Simmet (yellow card)	Report	Peter Eggert 37'	Attendance: 8,000; Referee: Jan Redelfs (Hanover)

15 January 1977 Bundesliga	Rot-Weiss Essen	1–0	Tennis Borussia Berlin	Georg-Melches-Stadion, Essen
15:30	Wieczorkowski 90'	Report		Attendance: 8,000; Referee: Gert Meuser (Ingelheim)

29 January 1977 Bundesliga	Fortuna Düsseldorf	0–0	Tennis Borussia Berlin	Rheinstadion, Düsseldorf
15:30		Report		Attendance: 14,000; Referee: Ferdinand Biwersi (Bliesransbach)

5 February 1977 Bundesliga	Tennis Borussia Berlin	0–0	Eintracht Braunschweig	Mommsenstadion, Berlin
15:30	Berkemeier (yellow card) Savkovic (yellow card)	Report	Dremmler (yellow card) Hollmann (yellow card)	Attendance: 11,000; Referee: Karl-Heinz Fork (Unna)

12 February 1977 Bundesliga	Tennis Borussia Berlin	3–1	FC Bayern München	Olympiastadion, Berlin
15:30	Wendt 43', 76'; Baake 52'	Report	Kirschner 83'	Attendance: 40,000; Referee: Rainer Waltert (Paderborn)

26 February 1977 Bundesliga	1. FC Köln	8–4	Tennis Borussia Berlin	Müngersdorfer Stadion, Cologne
15:30	Müller 5', 8', 67', 82'; Simmet 20', 49'; Overath 25'; Flohe 85'	Report	Hochheimer 2'; Stradt 44'; Berkemeier 68'; Subklewe 74'	Attendance: 14,000; Referee: Jürgen Meßmer (Mannheim)

5 March 1977 Bundesliga	Tennis Borussia Berlin	1–3	FC Schalke 04	Mommsenstadion, Berlin
15:30	Rüssmann 3' (o.g.); Savkovic (yellow card)	Report	Rüssmann 28' (yellow card); Abramczik 30'; Kremers 86'	Attendance: 13,000; Referee: Manfred Dölfel (Fürth)

12 March 1977 Bundesliga	Hamburger SV	2–1	Tennis Borussia Berlin	Volksparkstadion, Hamburg
15:30	Volkert 68' (yellow card); Keller 85' (yellow card)	Report	Schulz 49'; Sprenger (yellow card)	Attendance: 27,000; Referee: Gerd Hennig (Duisburg)

15 March 1977 Bundesliga	Tennis Borussia Berlin	1–1	Eintracht Frankfurt	Mommsenstadion, Berlin
20:00	Wendt 59' (pen.); Savkovic (yellow card)	Report	Wenzel 62'	Attendance: 8,000; Referee: Gert Meuser (Ingelheim)

19 March 1977 Bundesliga	Tennis Borussia Berlin	1–1	1. FC Saarbrücken	Mommsenstadion, Berlin
15:30	Schneider 75'	Report	Traser 68'; Förster (yellow card)	Attendance: 11,500; Referee: Manfred Wichmann (Gelsenkirchen)

26 March 1977 Bundesliga	Karlsruher SC	4–1	Tennis Borussia Berlin	Wildparkstadion, Karlsruhe
15:30	Flindt-Bjerg 13', 20'; Struth 35' (pen.); Janzon 84'	Report	Jakobs 85'	Attendance: 28,000; Referee: Paul Kindervater (Cologne)

2 April 1977 Bundesliga	Tennis Borussia Berlin	0–1	Borussia Mönchengladbach	Mommsenstadion, Berlin
15:30		Report	Simonsen 63'	Attendance: 15,000; Referee: Max Klauser (Munich)

7 April 1977 Bundesliga	MSV Duisburg	1–1	Tennis Borussia Berlin	Wedaustadion, Duisburg
20:00	Seliger 50' (pen.); Pirsig (yellow card)	Report	Wendt 57'; Schneider (yellow card) Sprenger (yellow card) Stradt (yellow card)	Attendance: 13,000; Referee: Heinz Quindeau (Ludwigshafen)

16 April 1977 Bundesliga	Tennis Borussia Berlin	2–0	Hertha BSC	Olympiastadion, Berlin
15:30	Schulz 66'; Stradt 83'; Baake (yellow card) (red card) 84'; Schneider (yellow card)	Report	Kliemann (yellow card) (red card) 41'; Hermandung (yellow card) Sziedat (yellow card)	Attendance: 42,000; Referee: Werner Burgers (Essen)

22 April 1977 Bundesliga	VfL Bochum	2–1	Tennis Borussia Berlin	Ruhrstadion, Bochum
20:00	Kaczor 52'; Lameck 65'	Report	Stradt 72' (yellow card)	Attendance: 12,000; Referee: Jürgen Walther (Würzburg)

7 May 1977 Bundesliga	Tennis Borussia Berlin	2–3	Borussia Dortmund	Mommsenstadion, Berlin
15:30	Stradt 18', 42'	Report	Vöge 32', 37'; Huber 89'	Attendance: 6,500; Referee: Dieter Dreher (Darmstadt)

14 May 1977 Bundesliga	SV Werder Bremen	0–0	Tennis Borussia Berlin	Weserstadion, Bremen
15:30	Røntved (yellow card)	Report		Attendance: 8,000; Referee: Ferdinand Biwersi (Bliesransbach); Man of the Match: Volkmar Groß (TeBe)

21 May 1977 Bundesliga	Tennis Borussia Berlin	4–2	1. FC Kaiserslautern	Mommsenstadion, Berlin
15:30	Wendt 27', 48'; Schneider 57'; Groß 89' (pen.)	Report	Toppmöller 56'; Metzler 90'; Melzer (yellow card)	Attendance: 4,000; Referee: Karl-Heinz Fork (Unna)

== Player statistics ==
Pos	Player	Apps	Goals	Apps	Goals	Apps	Goals
Pos	Player	Bundesliga		DFB-Pokal		Total	
DF	(West Germany) Hans-Jürgen Baake	19	1	2	0	21	1
MF	(West Germany) Winfried Berkemeier	33	2	2	0	35	2
GK	(West Germany) Hubert Birkenmeier	17	0	4	0	21	0
FW	(West Germany) Albert Bittlmayer	0	0	0	0	0	0
FW	(West Germany) Detlef Bruckhoff	5	0	0	0	5	0
DF	(West Germany) Peter Eggert	9	0	4	1	13	1
GK	(West Germany) Volkmar Groß	17	1	0	0	17	1
DF	(West Germany) Klaus-Peter Hanisch	9	0	1	1	10	1
MF	(West Germany) Dirk Heun	10	0	2	0	12	0
DF	(West Germany) Dieter Hochheimer	17	1	1	0	18	1
DF	(West Germany) Stephan Hoffmann	0	0	0	0	0	0
MF	(West Germany) Ditmar Jakobs	33	1	4	1	37	2
DF	(West Germany) Hans-Georg Kraus	31	0	2	1	33	1
FW	(West Germany) Christian Sackewitz	10	0	3	1	13	1
DF	(West Germany) Ernst Savkovic	29	0	3	0	32	0
DF	(West Germany) Reinhard Schmitz	26	1	4	3	30	4
MF	(West Germany) Lothar Schneider	33	5	4	0	37	5
MF	(West Germany) Jürgen Schulz	34	4	4	0	38	4
MF	(West Germany) Gerd Schwidrowski	2	0	1	0	3	0
DF	(West Germany) Hans Sprenger	20	0	1	0	21	0
FW	(West Germany) Klaus-Günter Stade	3	0	0	0	3	0
FW	(West Germany) Winfried Stradt	21	5	1	0	22	5
FW	(West Germany) Karlheinz Subklewe	22	4	2	1	24	5
FW	(Sweden) Benny Wendt	30	20	3	2	33	22
MF	(West Germany) Michael Zimmer	21	1	3	0	24	1

== Final league table ==
Pos	Team	Pld	W	D	L	GF	GA	GD	Pts	Qualification or relegation
14	1. FC Saarbrücken	34	9	11	14	43	55	−12	29	
15	VfL Bochum	34	11	7	16	47	62	−15	29	
16	Karlsruher SC (R)	34	9	10	15	53	75	−22	28	Relegation to 2. Bundesliga
17	Tennis Borussia Berlin (R)	34	6	10	18	47	85	−38	22	Relegation to 2. Bundesliga
18	Rot-Weiss Essen (R)	34	7	8	19	49	103	−54	22	Relegation to 2. Bundesliga

Source: www.dfb.de
Rules for classification: 1) points; 2) goal difference; 3) number of goals scored.
(R) Relegated
