= 1978–79 Hong Kong FA Cup =

Tournament details
- Country: Hong Kong

Final positions
- Champions: Yuen Long (1st title)
- Runners-up: Seiko

1978–79 Hong Kong FA Cup was the fifth staging of the Hong Kong FA Cup.

== Teams ==
- Blake Garden
- Bulova (From a lower division league)
- Caroline Hill
- Eastern
- Happy Valley
- HKFC (From a lower division league)
- Kowloon Fruit (From a lower division league)
- Kui Tan
- Po Chai Pills (From a lower division league)
- Police
- Sea Bee
- Seiko
- South China
- Tung Sing
- Urban Services
- Yuen Long

== Fixtures and results ==
=== Bracket ===
First Round
Yuen Long	2
Po Chai Pills	0
Sea Bee (PSO)	6
South China	5
Urban Services	2
HKFC	0
Blake Garden (PSO)	6
Kui Tan	5
Seiko	3
Happy Valley	1
Eastern	5
Kowloon Fruit	0
Tung Sing	3
Bulova	0
Police (PSO)	5
Caroline Hill	2

Quarter-finals
Yuen Long (PSO)	8
Sea Bee	7
Urban Services	2
Blake Garden	0
Seiko (AET)	2
Eastern	1
Tung Sing	2
Police	1

Semi-finals
Yuen Long	2
Urban Services	1
Seiko	2
Tung Sing	1

Final
Yuen Long (PSO)	2 (4)
Seiko	2 (2)

=== Final ===
1979-06-17
17:00

Yuen Long	2 – 2 (a.e.t.)	Seiko
Ho Kwok Leung 19'; Ng Yu Yin 52' (pen.)		McCrory 62'; Wu Kwok Hung 64'
Penalties
Ng Yu Yin (penalty scored); Yu Kwok Sum (penalty scored); Lee Lung Kwok (penalty scored); Hung Wai Ping (penalty scored)	4 – 2	(penalty scored) Wu Kwok Hung; (penalty scored) McCrory; (penalty missed) Semple; (penalty missed) McWilliams

Government Stadium
Attendance: 16,626

== Trivia ==
- Yuen Long, by winning the FA Cup, prevented Seiko from capturing all the 6 major trophies (First Division, Senior Shield, Viceroy Cup, Chairman's Cup, Wooden Shield and FA Cup) in the season.
- Despite losing the cup, Seiko kept the record of losing no matches in the 90-minute time among all local competitions in the season.
