= Wu Kwok Hung =

Hong Kong footballer

Personal information
- Date of birth: 22 May 1949
- Place of birth: British Hong Kong
- Date of death: 15 June 2015 (aged 66)
- Place of death: Hong Kong
- Height: 1.80 m (5 ft 11 in)
- Position: Midfielder

Senior career*
Years	Team	Apps	(Gls)
1968–1971	Tung Sing		
1971–1972	South China		
1972–1986	Seiko		

International career
1971–1986	Hong Kong	52	(10)
- * Club domestic league appearances and goals

Wu Kwok Hung (Chinese: 胡國雄; Jyutping: wu^{4} gwok^{3} hung^{4}; 22 May 1949 – 15 June 2015), nicknamed "Big Head", was a former Hong Kong professional football player. He is the best “No. 10” in Hong Kong football history.

== Club career ==
Wu played in the Hong Kong First Division League for teams including Tung Sing, South China and Seiko as a midfielder.

Wu joined Tung Sing in 1968 and played in the team for 3 years. In 1971–72, he played with South China. After that, he joined Seiko, where he helped the club to win more than 40 trophies in 14 years, including the 1983–84 championship and Senior Viceroy Cup.

Wu also won many individual prizes, including 4 consecutive time winner of Hong Kong Footballer of the Year between 1979 and 1982, and was part of Hong Kong's famous 1985 World Cup qualifying victory in China that ended the hopes of the mainland reaching the Mexico World Cup finals the following year.

After the 1985–86 season, Seiko withdrew from the league and Wu also retired from professional football. A testimonial match for Wu was held which attracted a full house at the then 28,000 seaters Hong Kong Stadium, proving his huge popularity with the fans.

== Death ==
Wu died on 15 June 2015 at the Pamela Youde Nethersole Eastern Hospital from laryngeal cancer, aged 66.

== Honours ==
=== Club ===
South China

- Hong Kong First Division: 1971–72
- Hong Kong Senior Shield: 1971–72
- Hong Kong Viceroy Cup: 1971–72

Seiko

- Hong Kong First Division: 1972–73, 1974–75, 1978–79, 1979–80, 1980–81, 1981–82, 1982–83, 1983–84, 1984–85
- Hong Kong Senior Shield: 1972–73, 1973–74, 1975–76, 1976–77, 1978–79, 1979–80, 1980–81, 1984–85
- Hong Kong FA Cup: 1974–75, 1975–76, 1977–78, 1979–80, 1980–81, 1985–86
- Hong Kong Viceroy Cup: 1972–73, 1977–78, 1978–79, 1983–84, 1984–85, 1985–86
- HKFA Chairman's Cup: 1976–77, 1977–78, 1978–79
- Chairman’s Cup 7-a-Side Tournament: 1980–81, 1981–82, 1982–83, 1985–86
- Stanley Wood Shield Tournament: 1972–73, 1978–79
- Golden Jubilee Cup: 1973–74
- HKFA President’s Cup: 1975–76

=== Individual ===
- Hong Kong Footballer of the Year: 1979, 1980, 1981, 1982

Sporting positions
Preceded by Kwok Ka Ming	Hong Kong national football team Captain; 1979–1980	Succeeded by Chan Sai Kau
