= 1977–78 Celtic F.C. season =

Celtic
1977–78 season
- Manager: Jock Stein
- Stadium: Celtic Park
- Scottish Premier Division: 5th
- Scottish Cup: 4th Round
- Scottish League Cup: Finalists
- European Cup: 2nd round

During the 1977–78 Scottish football season, Celtic competed in the Scottish Premier Division.

Despite not achieving any major honour this season, Celtic played the Scottish League Cup Final for the 14th season in a row, which is still a record as of 2025. No other team has played more than 5 League Cup Finals in a row.

This was the club's last season under manager Jock Stein, and the first season in which Danny McGrain was captain.

== Squad ==
Note: Flags indicate national team as defined under FIFA eligibility rules; some limited exceptions apply. Players may hold more than one non-FIFA nationality.

No.	Pos.	Nation	Player
—	GK	ENG	Peter Latchford
—	GK	ENG	Roy Baines
—	DF	SCO	Danny McGrain
—	DF	SCO	Andy Lynch
—	DF	SCO	Roddie MacDonald
—	DF	SCO	Roy Aitken
—	DF	ISL	Jóhannes Eðvaldsson
—	DF	SCO	Pat Stanton
—	DF	SCO	Frank Munro
—	DF	SCO	Joe Filippi
—	DF	SCO	Alan Sneddon
—	DF	SCO	Roy Kay
—	DF	SCO	Ian McWilliams
—	DF	SCO	Tom McAdam
—	MF	SCO	Tommy Burns

No.	Pos.	Nation	Player
—	MF	SCO	Ronnie Glavin
—	MF	SCO	Jim Casey
—	MF	SCO	Johnny Doyle
—	MF	ENG	Johnny Gibson
—	MF	SCO	Alfie Conn Jr.
—	MF	SCO	Mike Conroy
—	MF	SCO	John Dowie
—	MF	SCO	Peter Mackie
—	MF	SCO	John Clifford
—	FW	SCO	Bobby Lennox
—	FW	SCO	Paul Wilson
—	FW	SCO	George McCluskey
—	FW	SCO	Joe Craig
—	FW	SCO	John McCluskey
—	FW	SCO	Willie Temperley

== Competitions ==
=== Scottish Premier Division ===
==== League table ====
Pos	Team	Pld	W	D	L	GF	GA	GD	Pts	Qualification or relegation
3	Dundee United	36	16	8	12	42	32	+10	40	Qualification for the UEFA Cup first round
4	Hibernian	36	15	7	14	51	43	+8	37	Qualification for the UEFA Cup first round
5	Celtic	36	15	6	15	63	54	+9	36	
6	Motherwell	36	13	7	16	45	52	−7	33	
7	Partick Thistle	36	14	5	17	52	62	−10	33	

Source: Statto
Rules for classification: 1) points; 2) goal difference; 3) number of goals scored.

==== Matches ====
13 August 1977 Premier League	Celtic	0–0	Dundee United	Glasgow
15:00				Stadium: Celtic Park; Attendance: 33,159

20 August 1977 Premier League	Ayr United	2–1	Celtic	Ayr
15:00				Stadium: Somerset Park; Attendance: 14,553

27 August 1977 Premier League	Celtic	0–1	Motherwell	Glasgow
15:00				Stadium: Celtic Park; Attendance: 28,095

10 September 1977 Premier League	Rangers	3–2	Celtic	Glasgow
15:00				Stadium: Ibrox Park; Attendance: 50,820

17 September 1977 Premier League	Aberdeen	2–1	Celtic	Aberdeen
15:00 BST				Stadium: Pittodrie Stadium; Attendance: 26,830

24 September 1977 Premier League	Celtic	1–0	Clydebank	Glasgow
15:00 BST				Stadium: Celtic Park; Attendance: 18,983

1 October 1977 Premier League	Celtic	3–1	Hibernian	Glasgow
15:00 BST				Stadium: Celtic Park; Attendance: 24,791

8 October 1977 Premier League	Partick Thistle	1–0	Celtic	Glasgow
15:00 BST				Stadium: Firhill Park; Attendance: 19,629

15 October 1977 Premier League	Celtic	1–2	St Mirren	Glasgow
15:00 BST				Stadium: Celtic Park; Attendance: 27,722

22 October 1977 Premier League	Dundee United	1–2	Celtic	Dundee
15:00 BST				Stadium: Tannadice Park; Attendance: 17,198

29 October 1977 Premier League	Celtic	3–2	Ayr United	Glasgow
15:00 BST				Stadium: Celtic Park; Attendance: 19,202

5 November 1977 Premier League	Motherwell	2–3	Celtic	Motherwell
15:00 GMT				Stadium: Fir Park; Attendance: 16,547

12 November 1977 Premier League	Celtic	1–1	Rangers	Glasgow
15:00 GMT				Stadium: Celtic Park; Attendance: 53,359

19 November 1977 Premier League	Celtic	3–2	Aberdeen	Glasgow
15:00 GMT				Stadium: Celtic Park; Attendance: 26,224

10 December 1977 Premier League	Celtic	3–0	Partick Thistle	Glasgow
15:00 GMT				Stadium: Celtic Park; Attendance: 26,420

17 December 1977 Premier League	St Mirren	3–3	Celtic	Paisley
15:00 GMT				Stadium: St Mirren Park, Love Street; Attendance: 17,580

24 December 1978 Premier League	Celtic	1–0	Dundee United	Glasgow
15:00 GMT				Stadium: Celtic Park; Attendance: 20,246

31 December 1977 Premier League	Ayr United	2–1	Celtic	Ayr
15:00 GMT				Stadium: Somerset Park; Attendance: 12,238

2 January 1978 Premier League	Celtic	0–1	Motherwell	Glasgow
15:00 GMT				Stadium: Celtic Park; Attendance: 22,284

7 January 1978 Premier League	Rangers	3–1	Celtic	Glasgow
15:00 GMT				Stadium: Ibrox Park; Attendance: 54,421

14 January 1978 Premier League	Aberdeen	2–1	Celtic	Glasgow
15:00 GMT				Stadium: Celtic Park; Attendance: 25,643

25 February 1978 Premier League	Celtic	1–2	St Mirren	Glasgow
15:00 GMT				Stadium: Celtic Park; Attendance: 20,785

4 March 1978 Premier League	Dundee United	0–1	Celtic	Dundee
15:00 GMT				Stadium: Tannadice Park; Attendance: 14,161

11 March 1978 Premier League	Celtic	3–0	Ayr United	Glasgow
15:00 GMT				Stadium: Celtic Park; Attendance: 14,164

22 March 1978 Premier League	Motherwell	2–1	Celtic	Motherwell
19:30 GMT				Stadium: Fir Park; Attendance: 9,613

25 March 1978 Premier League	Celtic	2–0	Rangers	Glasgow
15:00 GMT				Stadium: Celtic Park; Attendance: 45,805

29 March 1978 Premier League	Partick Thistle	0–4	Celtic	Glasgow
19:30 GMT				Stadium: Firhill Park; Attendance: 12,291

1 April 1978 Premier League	Celtic	2–2	Aberdeen	Glasgow
15:00 GMT				Stadium: Celtic Park; Attendance: 23,159

5 April 1978 Premier League	Celtic	2–1	Hibernian	Glasgow
19:30 GMT				Stadium: Celtic Park; Attendance: 18,224

8 April 1978 Premier League	Clydebank	3–2	Celtic	Clydebank
15:00 BST				Stadium: Kilbowie Park; Attendance: 7,305

12 April 1978 Premier League	Hibernian	1–1	Celtic	Edinburgh
19:30 BST				Stadium: Easter Road; Attendance: 10,902

15 April 1978 Premier League	Hibernian	4–1	Celtic	Edinburgh
15:00 BST				Stadium: Easter Road; Attendance: 16,262

17 April 1978 Premier League	Celtic	5–2	Clydebank	Glasgow
19:30 BST				Stadium: Celtic Park; Attendance: 6,021

22 April 1978 Premier League	Celtic	5–2	Partick Thistle	Glasgow
15:00 BST				Stadium: Celtic Park; Attendance: 14,870

26 April 1978 Premier League	Clydebank	1–1	Celtic	Clydebank
19:30 BST				Stadium: Kilbowie Park; Attendance: 4,000

29 April 1978 Premier League	St Mirren	3–1	Celtic	Paisley
15:00 BST				Stadium: St Mirren Park, Love Street; Attendance: 17,441

=== Scottish Cup ===
6 February 1978 Third round	Celtic	7–1	Dundee	Glasgow
19:30 GMT				Stadium: Celtic Park; Attendance: 22,000

27 February 1978 Fourth round	Celtic	1–1	Kilmarnock	Glasgow
19:30 GMT				Stadium: Celtic Park; Attendance: 25,000

6 March 1978 Fourth round replay	Kilmarnock	1–0	Celtic	Kilmarnock
19:30 GMT				Stadium: Rugby Park; Attendance: 14,137

=== Scottish League Cup ===
31 August 1977 Second round 1st leg	Celtic	0–0	Motherwell	Glasgow
19:30 GMT				Stadium: Celtic Park; Attendance: 21,913

3 September 1977 Second round 2nd leg	Motherwell	2–4 (2–4 agg.)	Celtic	Motherwell
15:00 GMT				Stadium: Fir Park; Attendance: 20,494

5 October 1977 Third round 1st leg	Stirling Albion	1–2	Celtic	Stirling
19:30 GMT				Stadium: Annfield Stadium; Attendance: 8,536

26 October 1977 Third round 2nd leg	Celtic	1–1 (3–2 agg.)	Stirling Albion	Glasgow
19:30 GMT				Stadium: Celtic Park; Attendance: 11,326

9 November 1977 Quarter-final 1st leg	St Mirren	1–3	Celtic	Paisley
19:30 GMT				Stadium: St Mirren Park, Love Street; Attendance: 18,101

16 November 1977 Quarter-final 2nd leg	Celtic	2–0 (5–1 agg.)	St Mirren	Glasgow
19:30 GMT				Stadium: Celtic Park; Attendance: 15,962

1 March 1978 Semi-final	Hearts	0–2	Celtic	Glasgow
19:30 GMT				Stadium: Hampden Park; Attendance: 18,940

18 March 1978 Final	Rangers	2–1 (a.e.t.)	Celtic	Glasgow
15:00 GMT				Stadium: Hampden Park; Attendance: 60,268

=== European Cup ===
14 September 1977 1st round 1st leg	Celtic (Scotland)	5–0	(Luxembourg) Jeunesse d'Esch	Glasgow
20:00 GMT				Stadium: Celtic Park; Attendance: 22,000

28 September 1977 1st round 2nd leg	Jeunesse d'Esch (Luxembourg)	1–6 (1–11 agg.)	(Scotland) Celtic	Esch-sur-Alzette
20:00 GMT				Stadium: Stade de la Frontière; Attendance: 3,580

19 October 1977 2nd round 1st leg	Celtic (Scotland)	2–1	(Austria) Wacker Innsbruck	Glasgow
20:00 GMT				Stadium: Celtic Park; Attendance: 30,000

2 November 1977 2nd round 2nd leg	Wacker Innsbruck (Austria)	3–0 (4–2 agg.)	(Scotland) Celtic	Innsbruck
20:00 GMT				Stadium: Tivoli; Attendance: 18,000
