= Benny Wendt =

Swedish footballer

- Wendt in 1985

Personal information
- Full name: Benny Bernhard Heinz Wendt
- Date of birth: 4 November 1950 (age 76)
- Place of birth: Norrköping, Sweden
- Height: 1.85 m (6 ft 1 in)
- Position: Forward

Senior career*
Years	Team	Apps	(Gls)
1969–1975	IFK Norrköping	128	(51)
1975–1976	1. FC Köln	6	(0)
1976–1977	Tennis Borussia Berlin	30	(20)
1977–1981	1. FC Kaiserslautern	116	(35)
1981–1983	Standard Liège	56	(22)
1983–1984	Seiko	27	(9)
1984–1985	SC Freiburg	13	(4)
Total		376	(141)

International career
1972–1978	Sweden	20	(1)
- * Club domestic league appearances and goals

Benny Bernhard Heinz Wendt (born 4 November 1950) is a Swedish former professional footballer who played as a forward. Starting his career with IFK Norrköping in 1969, he went on to play in Germany, Belgium, and Hong Kong before retiring in 1985. A full international between 1972 and 1978, he won 20 caps for the Sweden national team and scored one goal. He was part of the Sweden team that played at the 1978 FIFA World Cup.

== Career ==
Wendt started his career with IFK Norrköping in 1975. He later moved to 1. FC Köln, Tennis Borussia Berlin, 1. FC Kaiserslautern, Seiko, Standard Liège and SC Freiburg. He helped Standard Liège to reach the UEFA Cup Winners' Cup Final in 1982, where they were beaten 2–1 by FC Barcelona. He also played in the 1978 FIFA World Cup for Sweden men's national football team.

== Honours ==
IFK Norrköping

- Swedish Cup: runner-up 1971–72

Standard Liège

- Belgian First Division: 1981–82, 1982–83
- Belgian Super Cup: 1981, 1983
- European Cup Winners' Cup: runner-up 1981–82
- Intertoto Cup Group Winners: 1982

1. FC Kaiserslautern

- DFB-Pokal: runner-up 1980–81

Seiko AA

- Hong Kong First Division League: 1983–84
- Hong Kong Viceroy Cup: 1983–84
