= Hong Kong Top Footballer Awards =

Hong Kong Premier League awards

The Hong Kong Top Footballers Awards (Chinese: 香港足球明星選舉), established by the Hong Kong Football Association in 1978, recognizes the top performers for each season's Hong Kong Premier League. The prizes are decided according to the votes from mass media and the general public. The Best Eleven Squad are voted by the public, Premier League coaches and managers and staff from different mass media. The votes from public counts 30% and the remaining 70% are from the professionals. Some other newer prizes include Best Youth Player, Best Foreign Player and Best Coach Award. In 2004, the Most Popular Player Award was established and in the same year, named sponsorship was used. There were some special prizes given out during the history, which includes the Silver Jubilee Footballer Award for Wu Kwok Hung in 2003 and Hong Kong Broadcasting 75th Anniversary Honour Award for Yiu Cheuk Yin, Tam Kong Pak and Ko Po Keung in 2004.

== Different categories of award ==
=== Hong Kong Top Footballers ===
For the full team lists of Hong Kong Top Footballers, please refer to List of Hong Kong Top Footballers.

2025–26

| Position | Player | Team |
|---|---|---|
| GK | (Hong Kong) Paulo César | Eastern District |
| DF | (Brazil) Gabriel Cividini (4) | Tai Po |
| DF | (Brazil) Weverton | Tai Po |
| DF | (Uzbekistan) Dostonbek Tursunov | Lee Man |
| DF | (Hong Kong) Kam Chi Kin | Kitchee |
| MF | (Spain) Asier Illarramendi | Kitchee |
| MF | (Hong Kong) Tan Chun Lok | Kitchee |
| MF | (Japan) Yumemi Kanda | Kitchee |
| FW | (Hong Kong) Everton Camargo (5) | Lee Man |
| FW | (Brazil) Igor Sartori (2) | Tai Po |
| FW | (Japan) Yu Okubo | Eastern |

=== Footballer of the Year ===
| Year | Player | Team |
|---|---|---|
| 1978 | (Hong Kong) Leung Nang Yan | South China |
| 1979 | (Hong Kong) Wu Kwok Hung | Seiko |
| 1980 | (Hong Kong) Wu Kwok Hung (2) | Seiko |
| 1981 | (Hong Kong) Wu Kwok Hung (3) | Seiko |
| 1982 | (Hong Kong) Wu Kwok Hung (4) | Seiko |
| 1983 | (Hong Kong) Leung Sui Wing | Happy Valley |
| 1984 | (Hong Kong) Chan Wan Ngok | Bulova |
| 1985 | (Hong Kong) Lau Wing Yip | Happy Valley |
| 1986 | (Hong Kong) Leung Sui Wing (2) | Happy Valley |
| 1987 | (Hong Kong) Ku Kam Fai | South China |
| 1988 | (Hong Kong) Chan Fat Chi | South China |
| 1989 | (Hong Kong) Chan Fat Chi (2) | South China |
| 1990 | (Hong Kong) Leslie Santos | South China |
| 1991 | (Hong Kong) Leslie Santos (2) | South China |
| 1992 | (Hong Kong) Chan Ping On | South China |
| 1993 | (Hong Kong) Lee Kin Wo | Eastern |
| 1994 | (Hong Kong) Lee Kin Wo (2) | Eastern |
| 1995 | (Hong Kong) Tam Siu Wai | Rangers |
| 1996 | (Hong Kong) Cheng Siu Chung | South China |
| 1997 | (Hong Kong) Au Wai Lun | South China |
| 1998 | (Bulgaria) Dimitre Kalkanov | Instant-Dict |
| 1999 | (Hong Kong) Yau Kin Wai | South China |
| 2000 | (Brazil) Tomy Adriano Giacomeli | Happy Valley |
| 2001 | (Brazil) Cristiano Cordeiro | South China |
| 2002 | (England) Gary McKeown | Sun Hei |
| 2003 | (Hong Kong) Lee Kin Wo (3) | South China |
| 2004 | (Hong Kong) Fan Chun Yip | Happy Valley |
| 2005 | (Brazil) Cristiano Cordeiro (2) | Sun Hei |
| 2006 | (Hong Kong) Au Wai Lun (2) | South China |
| 2007 | (China) Li Haiqiang | South China |
| 2008 | (China) Li Haiqiang (2) | South China |
| 2009 | (Hong Kong) Lee Wai Lim | Tai Po |
| 2010 | (Hong Kong) Chan Siu Ki | South China |
| 2011 | (Spain) Roberto Losada | Kitchee |
| 2012 | (Hong Kong) Lo Kwan Yee | Kitchee |
| 2013 | (Hong Kong) Huang Yang | Kitchee |
| 2014 | (Spain) Fernando Recio | Kitchee |
| 2015 | (Brazil) Giovane da Silva | Eastern |
| 2016 | (Hong Kong) Yapp Hung Fai | Eastern |
| 2017 | (Brazil) Fernando | Kitchee |
| 2018 | (Hungary) Krisztián Vadócz | Kitchee |
| 2019 | (Brazil) Igor Sartori | Tai Po |
| 2020 | Cancelled due to COVID-19 pandemic in Hong Kong | |
| 2021 | (Montenegro) Dejan Damjanović | Kitchee |
| 2022 | Cancelled due to COVID-19 pandemic in Hong Kong | |
| 2023 | (Turkmenistan) Ruslan Mingazov | Kitchee |
| 2024 | (Hong Kong) Chan Siu Kwan | Tai Po |
| 2025 | (Spain) Noah Baffoe | Eastern |
| 2026 | (Spain) Asier Illarramendi | Kitchee |

==== Multiple-time Footballer of the Year Winners ====
- 4 – Wu Kwok Hung
- 3 – Lee Kin Wo
- 2 – Leung Sui Wing, Chan Fat Chi, Leslie Santos, Au Wai Lun, Li Haiqiang

=== Young Players of the Year ===
| Year | Player | | Player | |
| Year | Name | Team | Name | Team |
|---|---|---|---|---|
| 1984 | (Hong Kong) Chan Shu Ming | Tung Sing | – | |
| 1985 | (Hong Kong) Chan Chi Yin | Eastern | – | |
| 1986 | (Hong Kong) Chan Kwok Fai | Sea Bee | (Hong Kong) Chan Chi Kwong | Tsuen Wan |
| 1987 | (Hong Kong) Lee Kin Wo | Eastern | (Hong Kong) Lee Fuk Wing | Sea Bee |
| 1988 | (Hong Kong) Leslie Santos | South China | (Hong Kong) Chiu Chung Man | May Ching |
| 1989 | (Hong Kong) Chiu Chung Man | South China | (Hong Kong) Choi Chi Ping | Sing Tao |
| 1990 | (Hong Kong) Tam Siu Wai | Eastern | (Hong Kong) Ng Kam Hung | Happy Valley |
| 1991 | (Hong Kong) Tam Siu Wai (2) | Eastern | (Hong Kong) Wong Chi Keung | Kui Tan |
| 1992 | (Hong Kong) Tam Siu Wai (3) | Eastern | (Hong Kong) Yau Kin Wai | Rangers |
| 1993 | (Hong Kong) Chung Ho Yin | Eastern | (Hong Kong) Lo Kai Wah | Eastern |
| 1994 | (Hong Kong) Yau Kin Wai (2) | Kitchee | (Hong Kong) Yeung Hei Chi | Kitchee |
| 1995 | (Hong Kong) Ng Chun Chung | Frankwell | (Hong Kong) Kwok Yue Hung | Happy Valley |
| 1996 | (Hong Kong) Chan Chi Hong | South China | (Hong Kong) Wai Kwan Lung | Sing Tao |
| 1997 | (Hong Kong) Wai Kwan Lung (2) | Sing Tao | (Hong Kong) Yiu Hok Man | Rangers |
| 1998 | (Hong Kong) Leung Chi Wing | Rangers | (Hong Kong) Kwok Man Tik | Happy Valley |
| 1999 | (Hong Kong) Poon Yiu Cheuk | Happy Valley | (Hong Kong) Chan Ka Ki | Yee Hope |
| 2000 | (Hong Kong) Chan Ka Ki (2) | Orient & Yee Hope Union | (Hong Kong) Kwok Man Tik (2) | Happy Valley |
| 2001 | (Hong Kong) Ng Wai Chiu | Instant-Dict | (Hong Kong) Chan Ho Man | Orient & Yee Hope Union |
| 2002 | (Hong Kong) Chan Ho Man (2) | South China | (Hong Kong) Goldbert Chi Chiu | Buler Rangers |
| 2003 | (Hong Kong) Goldbert Chi Chiu (2) | Rangers | – | |
| 2004 | (Hong Kong) Chan Siu Ki | Kitchee | (Hong Kong) Sham Kwok Keung | Happy Valley |
| 2005 | (Hong Kong) Chan Siu Ki (2) | Kitchee | (Hong Kong) Tse Tak Him | Citizen |
| 2006 | (Hong Kong) Cheung Kin Fung | Kitchee | (Hong Kong) Tse Tak Him (2) | Citizen |
| 2007 | (Hong Kong) Leung Chun Pong | Citizen | (Hong Kong) Chan Siu Ki (3) | Kitchee |
| 2008 | (Hong Kong) Lo Chun Kit | Eastern | (Hong Kong) Kwok Kin Pong | South China |
| 2009 | (Hong Kong) Au Yeung Yiu Chung | South China | (Hong Kong) Li Hon Ho | Tai Po |
| 2010 | (Hong Kong) Yapp Hung Fai | Pegasus | (Hong Kong) Kwok Kin Pong (2) | South China |
| 2011 | (Hong Kong) James Ha | HKFC | (Hong Kong) To Hon To | Tai Po |
| 2012 | (Hong Kong) Lau Cheuk Hin | Sham Shui Po | (Hong Kong) Lam Hok Hei | Rangers |
| 2013 | (Hong Kong) Yapp Hung Fai (2) | South China | (Hong Kong) Lam Hok Hei (2) | Rangers |
| 2014 | (Hong Kong) Chuck Yiu Kwok | Rangers | (Hong Kong) Wong Wai | Yokohama FC Hong Kong |
| 2015 | (Hong Kong) Chan Siu Kwan | South China | (Hong Kong) Leung Kwun Chung | YFCMD |
| 2016 | (Hong Kong) Li Ngai Hoi | Kitchee | (Hong Kong) Tan Chun Lok | Pegasus |
| 2017 | (Hong Kong) Tan Chun Lok | Tai Po | (Hong Kong) Wong Tsz Ho | Eastern |
| 2018 | (Hong Kong) Cheng Chin Lung | Kitchee | (Hong Kong) Lam Hin Ting | Dreams FC |
| 2019 | (Hong Kong) Wu Chun Ming | Pegasus | (Hong Kong) Cheng Siu Kwan | Lee Man |
| 2020 | Cancelled due to COVID-19 pandemic in Hong Kong | | | |
| 2021 | (Hong Kong) Ho Chun Ting | Kitchee | (Hong Kong) Sun Ming Him | Pegasus |
| 2022 | Cancelled due to COVID-19 pandemic in Hong Kong | | | |
| 2023 | (Hong Kong) Sun Ming Him (2) | Eastern | (Hong Kong) Wong Ho Chun | Eastern |
| 2024 | (Hong Kong) Yu Joy Yin | Eastern | (Hong Kong) Ma Hei Wai | Eastern |
| 2025 | (Hong Kong) Ng Wai Him | Southern | (Hong Kong) Sohgo Ichikawa | Southern |
| 2026 | (Hong Kong) Kam Chi Kin | Kitchee | (Hong Kong) Lee Lok Him | Tai Po |

=== Coach of the Year ===
| Year | Coach name | Team |
|---|---|---|
| 1999 | (Hong Kong) Wong Yiu Shun | Yee Hope |
| 2000 | (Brazil) Casemiro Mior | South China |
| 2001 | (Hong Kong) Kwok Ka Ming | Instant-Dict |
| 2002 | (Brazil) Casemiro Mior (2) | South China |
| 2003 | (Malaysia) Koo Luam Khen | Sun Hei |
| 2004 | (Hong Kong) Chan Hung Ping | Happy Valley |
| 2005 | (Malaysia) Koo Luam Khen | Sun Hei |
| 2006 | (Serbia) Dejan Antonić | Kitchee |
| 2007 | (Brazil) Casemiro Mior (3) | South China |
| 2008 | (Hong Kong) Liu Chun Fai | Citizen |
| 2009 | (Hong Kong) Leslie Santos | Sun Hei |
| 2010 | (South Korea) Kim Pan-Gon | South China |
| 2011 | (Spain) Josep Gombau | Kitchee |
| 2012 | (Spain) Josep Gombau (2) | Kitchee |
| 2013 | (Hong Kong) Fung Hoi Man | Southern |
| 2014 | (Hong Kong) Chan Chi Hong | Pegasus |
| 2015 | (Hong Kong) Lee Chi Kin | YFCMD |
| 2016 | (Hong Kong) Chan Yuen Ting | Eastern |
| 2017 | (Hong Kong) Chu Chi Kwong | Kitchee |
| 2018 | (Hong Kong) Chu Chi Kwong (2) | Kitchee |
| 2019 | (Hong Kong) Lee Chi Kin (2) | Tai Po |
| 2020 | Cancelled due to COVID-19 pandemic in Hong Kong | |
| 2021 | (Hong Kong) Chu Chi Kwong (3) | Kitchee |
| 2022 | Cancelled due to COVID-19 pandemic in Hong Kong | |
| 2023 | (Hong Kong) Roberto Losada | Eastern |
| 2024 | (Hong Kong) Roberto Losada (2) | Eastern |
| 2025 | (Hong Kong) Roberto Losada (3) | Eastern |
| 2026 | (Spain) Iñigo Calderón | Kitchee |

=== Fan's Favourite Player ===
| Year | Name | Team |
|---|---|---|
| 2004 | (Hong Kong) Fan Chun Yip | Happy Valley |
| 2005 | (Hong Kong) Fan Chun Yip (2) | Happy Valley |
| 2006 | (Hong Kong) Au Wai Lun | South China |
| 2007 | (Hong Kong) Cristiano Cordeiro | Sun Hei |
| 2008 | (Hong Kong) Lee Chi Ho | South China |
| 2009 | (Hong Kong) Lee Kin Wo | Eastern |
| 2010 | Not awarded | |
| 2011 | (Spain) Roberto Losada | Kitchee |
| 2012 | (Brazil) Aender Naves Mesquita | Sham Shui Po |
| 2013 | (Hong Kong) Chan Wai Ho | South China |
| 2014 | (Bosnia and Herzegovina) Admir Raščić | Pegasus |
| 2015 | (Serbia) Bojan Mališić | South China |
| 2016 | (Japan) Kenji Fukuda | Dreams Metro Gallery |
| 2017 | (Brazil) Fernando | Kitchee |
| 2018 | (Hungary) Krisztián Vadócz | Kitchee |
| 2019 | (Brazil) Igor Sartori | Tai Po |
| 2020 | Cancelled due to COVID-19 pandemic in Hong Kong | |
| 2021 | (Hong Kong) Dani Cancela | Kitchee |
| 2022 | Cancelled due to COVID-19 pandemic in Hong Kong | |
| 2023 | (England) Freddie Toomer | HKFC |
| 2024 | (Hong Kong) Chan Siu Kwan | Tai Po |
| 2025 | (Hong Kong) Chan Siu Kwan (2) | Tai Po |
| 2026 | (Brazil) Gabriel Cividini | Tai Po |

=== Players' Player ===
| Year | Name | Team |
|---|---|---|
| 2016 | (Brazil) Diego Eli | Eastern |
| 2017 | (Brazil) Fernando | Kitchee |
| 2018 | (Hungary) Krisztián Vadócz | Kitchee |
| 2019 | (Brazil) Igor Sartori | Tai Po |
| 2020 | Cancelled due to COVID-19 pandemic in Hong Kong | |
| 2021 | (England) Charlie Scott | Happy Valley |
| 2022 | Cancelled due to COVID-19 pandemic in Hong Kong | |
| 2023 | (Hong Kong) Chan Siu Kwan | Resources Capital |
| 2024 | (Spain) Noah Baffoe | Eastern |
| 2025 | (Hong Kong) Everton Camargo | Lee Man |
| 2026 | (Brazil) Samuel Granada | North District |

=== Best Hong Kong Representative Team Player ===
| Year | Name | Team |
|---|---|---|
| 2024 | Chan Siu Kwan | (Hong Kong) Tai Po |
| 2025 | Everton Camargo | (Hong Kong) Lee Man |
| 2026 | Shinichi Chan | (China) Shanghai Shenhua |

=== Women’s Footballer of the Year ===
| Year | Name | Team |
|---|---|---|
| 2019 | (Hong Kong) Wong Shuk Fan | Happy Valley |
| 2020 | Cancelled due to COVID-19 pandemic in Hong Kong | |
| 2021 | Cancelled due to COVID-19 pandemic in Hong Kong | |
| 2022 | Cancelled due to COVID-19 pandemic in Hong Kong | |
| 2023 | (Hong Kong) Cheung Wai Ki | Kitchee |
| 2024 | (Hong Kong) Cheung Wai Ki (2) | Kitchee |

== Defunct awards ==
=== Best Foreign Player ===
| Year | Name | Team |
|---|---|---|
| 1992 | (England) Iain Hesford | Eastern |
| 1993 | (Federal Republic of Yugoslavia) Anto Grabo | South China |
| 1994 | (England) Dale Tempest | Eastern |
| 1995 | (China) Wu Qunli | South China |
