= 2006–07 HKFA Chairman's Cup =

Hong Kong Football Association Chairman's Cup 2006-07 was the 32nd staging of the competition, held between 5 March and 21 May 2007, and won by Citizen Reserve. The reserve teams of the 9 First Division League clubs entered the competition.

Despite the fact that the competition is for reserve teams, many teams send first team players for the matches. In fact, some of the clubs do not have any reserve team players, so many first team players, including foreign players, play in the matches as well.

== Bracket ==
Quarter-finals
Xiangxue Sun Hei Reserve	5
#	HKFC Reserve	8
South China Reserve	6
Happy Valley Reserve	0
Citizen Reserve	3
Kitchee Reserve	2
Rangers Reserve	3 (3)
Hong Kong 08 Reserve (PSO)	3 (4)

Semi-finals
HKFC Reserve	1
South China Reserve	4
Citizen Reserve	4
Hong Kong 08 Reserve	1

Final
South China Reserve	1
Citizen Reserve	2

Hong Kong Football Association
Chairman's Cup 2006-07 Winner

Citizen
First Title

Note #: HKFC Reserve beat Wofoo Tai Po Reserve by 3–2 in the first round match to enter into the quarter-final.

== First round ==
5 March 2007
20:15

HKFC Reserve	3-2	Wofoo Tai Po Reserve
Destiny O Ugo 16'; Lai Chun Kit (yellow card) 31'; Destiny O Ugo (yellow card) 48'; Lawrence Akandu 62'; Wong Yiu Fu 68'; Wong Yiu Fu (yellow card) 73'		Joel 31'; Joel (yellow card) 73'; Li Shu San 82'

Kowloon Bay Sports Ground

== Quarter-finals ==
2 April 2007
18:45

Citizen Reserve	3-2	Kitchee Reserve
Xu Deshuai 16'; Anthony Dela Nyatepe 31'; Fung Chung Ting 51'; Festus Baise (yellow card) 82'		Leung Ngo Hin 10'; Lai Ka Fai 77' (O.G.)

Happy Valley Recreation Ground #6

2 April 2007
20:30

Rangers Reserve	3-3 3-4 (PSO)	Hong Kong 08 Reserve
Godfred Karikari 29'; Alexandre De Moraes 67'; Yip Chi Ho (yellow card) 73'; Godfred Karikari (yellow card) 82'; Ye Jia 90'		Lau Nim Yat 9'; Yu Ho Pong 17'; Au Yeung Yiu Ching 20'; Ho Min Tong (yellow card) 40'; Yuen Kin man (yellow card) 78'

Happy Valley Recreation Ground #6

16 April 2007
20:30

HKFC Reserve	8-3	Xiangxue Sun Hei Reserve
Destiny O Ugo 14' 55'; Jaimes McKee 35' 60'; Lawrence Akandu 36' 38'; Chan Ka Hing 51'; Wong Yiu Fu 85'		Lo Chi Kwan 52'; Victor Eromosele Inegbenoise 59'; Cordeiro (yellow card) 64'; Chu Siu Kei 79'

Ma On Shan Recreation Ground

30 April 2007
14:15

South China Reserve	6-0	Happy Valley Reserve
Cheng Siu Wai 15' 20' 26'; Liang Zicheng 41'; Li Ling Fung 48' 80'; Chong Kai Chung (yellow card) 75'		Tong Kin Man (yellow card) 89'

South China Athletic Association

== Semifinals ==
23 April 2007
18:30

Citizen Reserve	4-1	Hong Kong 08 Reserve
Wang Zhengchuang 24'; Anthony Dela Nyatepe 30'; Joreg Clsudio C. Rodigues 36'; Xu Deshuai (yellow card) 69'; Li Chun Yip (yellow card) 80'; Fung Chung Ting 81'		Yuen Kin Man (yellow card) 37'; Chan Man Fai 58'; Lo CHun Kit (yellow card) 80'; Li Ka Wing (yellow card) 85'

Kowloon Bay Sports Ground

6 May 2007
15:00

HKFC Reserve	1-4	South China Reserve
Lee Wai Tik (yellow card) 40'; Li Hang Wui 42'; Ho Kwok Chuen (yellow card) 80'		Cheng Siu Wai 5' 54'; Kwok Kin Pong 20'; Leung Ho Chun (yellow card) 74'; Liang Zicheng 89'

Kowloon Tsai Park soccer pitch #1

== Final ==
21 May 2007
15:00

South China Reserve	1-2	Citizen Reserve
Chong Kai Chung 73'		Joreg Claudio C. Rodrigues 23' 27' (PEN.)

Siu Sai Wan Sports Ground

== Top Scorers ==
Rank	Scorer	Team	Goals
1	(Hong Kong) Cheng Siu Wai	South China Reserves	5
2	(Brazil) Rodrigues	Citizen Reserves	3
=	(Hong Kong) Lawrence	HKFC Reserves	3
=	(England) Destiny	HKFC Reserves	3
5	(Hong Kong) Li Ling Fung	South China Reserves	2
=	(China) Liang Zicheng	South China Reserves	2
=	(Hong Kong) Fung Chung Ting	Citizen Reserves	2
=	(Ghana) Anthony	Citizen Reserves	2
=	(England) Jaimes Mckee	HKFC Reserves	2
=	(Hong Kong) Wong Yiu Fu	HKFC Reserves	2

== Trivia ==
- The final, which was scheduled on 20 May was postponed to 21 May due to heavy rain on the day.
