= 2007–08 HKFA Chairman's Cup =

Hong Kong Football Association Chairman's Cup 2007-08 is the 33rd staging of the competition. The reserve teams of the 9 First Division League clubs and Hong Kong C Team entered the competition.

== Bracket ==
All times are Hong Kong Time (UTC+8).

=== Bracket ===
First round
Citizen Reserves	0
Eastern Reserves	2
Hong Kong B Team	0 (1)
Workable Reserves (PSO)	0 (4)

Quarter-finals
Eastern Reserves	10
Happy Valley Reserves	2
Convoy Sun Hei Reserves	3
South China Reserves	1
Kitchee Reserves	0
Wofoo Tai Po Reserves	5
Workable Reserves	0
Bulova Rangers Reserves	5

Semi-finals
Eastern Reserves	5
Convoy Sun Hei Reserves	3
Wofoo Tai Po Reserves	0
Bulova Rangers Reserves	1

Final
Eastern Reserves	3
Bulova Rangers Reserves	8

=== First round ===
Match 1
2 April 2008
18:30

Citizen Reserves	0 - 2	Eastern Reserves
Cheng Ching Hang (yellow card) 71'		Chung Wai Ho (yellow card) 23'; Yu Ho Pong (yellow card) 76'; Leung Tsz Chun 80' (pen.); So Yiu Man (yellow card) 84'; Michael Hampshire 88'

Hammer Hill Road Sports Ground

Match 2
2 April 2008
20:15

Hong Kong C Team	0 - 0 1 - 4 (PSO)	Workable Reserves
Cheung Chun Hei (yellow card) 34'; Tam Ho Pong (yellow card) 36'		Gao Zhen (yellow card) 66'
Penalties
Yan Chi Kan (penalty scored)	1:4	(penalty scored) Li Michael Man Hin; (penalty scored) Lam Wing Chung; (penalty scored) Kan Tsz Yeung; (penalty scored) Yick Chi Ho

Hammer Hill Road Sports Ground

=== Quarter-finals ===
QF1
9 April 2008
17:45

Workable Reserves	0 - 5	Bulova Rangers Reserves
Tsang Chiu Tat (yellow card) 19'; Kan Tsz Yeung (yellow card) 35'		Liang Zicheng 1' 20' 37' (pen.); To Hon To 39'; Iu Wai 89'

Mong Kok Stadium
Attendance: 1,000

QF2
9 April 2008
18:30

Eastern Reserves	10 - 2	Happy Valley Reserves
Leung Tsz Chun 3' 11' 76' (pen.); Michael Hampshire 16' 38' 47' 56'; Chan Chi Kwong (yellow card) 25'; Yip Tsz Chun 55'; Yip Tsz Chun 79'; Hon Sing Barnes 87'		Ma Ka Yik 5'; Cheung Sai Ho 25' (pen.); Ng Ho Yin (yellow card) 49'; Wong Ka Wai (yellow card) 75'

Hammer Hill Road Sports Ground

QF3
9 April 2008
20:15

Convoy Sun Hei Reserves	3 - 1	South China Reserves
Chan Yiu Lun 15' 36'; Tse Man Wing (yellow card) 37'; Giovane 64'		Li Ling Fung 47'; Chou Hung Shan (yellow card) 86'; Li Ka Siu (yellow card) 87'

Hammer Hill Road Sports Ground

QF4
9 April 2008
20:15

Kitchee Reserves	0 - 5	Wofoo Tai Po Reserves
Chan Wun (yellow card) 80'		Rafael 3' 21' 34'; Ho Wai Cheong 47' (o.g.); Sze Kin Wai 58'

Ma Chai Hang Recreation Ground

=== Semi-finals ===
SF1
16 April 2008
18:30

Eastern Reserves	5 - 3	Convoy Sun Hei Reserves
Yu Ho Pong 12'; Leung Chi Kui 15' 78'; Yip Tsz Chun 66' 73'		Chan Yiu Lun 59'; Carlos 76' 89'

Hammer Hill Road Sports Ground

SF2
16 April 2008
20:15

Bulova Rangers Reserves	1 - 0	Wofoo Tai Po Reserves
Luciano (yellow card) 31'; Liang Zicheng (yellow card) 50'; Chan Siu Yuen (yellow card) 50'; Chan Ho Man 89'		Rafael (yellow card) 25'; Chan Hin Kwong (yellow card) 89'

Hammer Hill Road Sports Ground

=== Final ===
30 April 2008
18:30

Eastern Reserves	3 – 8	Bulova Rangers Reserves
Lee Sze Ming 2'; Yip Tsz Chun 5'; Lee Sze Ming (yellow card) 8'; Leung Chi Kui 20'; Yu Ho Pong (yellow card) 81'	(Report)	Lam Ka Wai 9' (pen.) 69' 79'; To Hon To 13'; Caleb 14'; Siumar 26' 50'; Caleb (yellow card) 33'; Lam Ka Wai (yellow card) 38'; Lau Ka Shing 57'; Iu Wai (yellow card) 75'

Hammer Hill Road Sports Ground

== Top Scorers ==
Rank	Scorer	Team	Goals
1	(Hong Kong) Yip Tsz Chun	Eastern Reserves	5
=	(England) Michael Hampshire	Eastern Reserves	5
3	(Hong Kong) Leung Tsz Chun	Eastern Reserves	4
4	(Brazil) Betine	Wofoo Tai Po Reserves	3
=	(Hong Kong) Lam Ka Wai	Bulova Rangers Reserves	3
=	(China) Liang Zicheng	Bulova Rangers Reserves	3
=	(Hong Kong) Chan Yiu Lun	Convoy Sun Hei Reserves	3
=	(Hong Kong) Leung Chi Kui	Eastern Reserves	3
9	(China) To Hon To	Bulova Rangers Reserves	2
=	(Brazil) Siumar	Bulova Rangers Reserves	2
=	(Brazil) Carlos	Convoy Sun Hei Reserves	2

== See also ==
- 2007/2008 Hong Kong Football Association Chairman's Cup
