= Chairman's Cup =

Chairman's Cup is the name of 2 football (soccer) competitions:

- HKFA Chairman's Cup, a competition for the reserve teams of Hong Kong First Division clubs
- Northern Premier League Chairman's Cup, an annual game played between the champions of the Northern Premier League Division One North and South
