= 1979–80 Hong Kong First Division League =

Hong Kong First Division
- Season: 1979–80
- Champions: Seiko
- Relegated: Kui Tan; Urban Services
- Matches played: 132
- Goals scored: 353 (2.67 per match)

The 1979–80 Hong Kong First Division League season was the 69th since its establishment.

== League table ==
Pos	Team	Pld	W	D	L	GF	GA	GD	Pts
1	Seiko (C)	22	18	3	1	58	15	+43	39
2	Happy Valley	22	14	4	4	39	20	+19	32
3	Bulova	22	13	3	6	36	20	+16	29
4	South China	22	9	7	6	26	16	+10	25
5	Tung Sing	22	10	4	8	42	41	+1	24
6	Sea Bee	22	8	5	9	19	24	−5	21
7	Eastern	22	6	8	8	26	34	−8	20
8	Caroline Hill	22	6	8	8	24	31	−7	20
9	Yuen Long (W)	22	6	6	10	27	31	−4	18
10	HKFC	22	6	5	11	21	31	−10	17
11	Kui Tan (R)	22	6	4	12	23	29	−6	16
12	Urban Services (R)	22	1	1	20	12	61	−49	3

Source: rsssf.com
(C) Champions; (R) Relegated; (W) Withdrew from the league system after the season
