= George Knobel =

Dutch football manager (1922–2012)

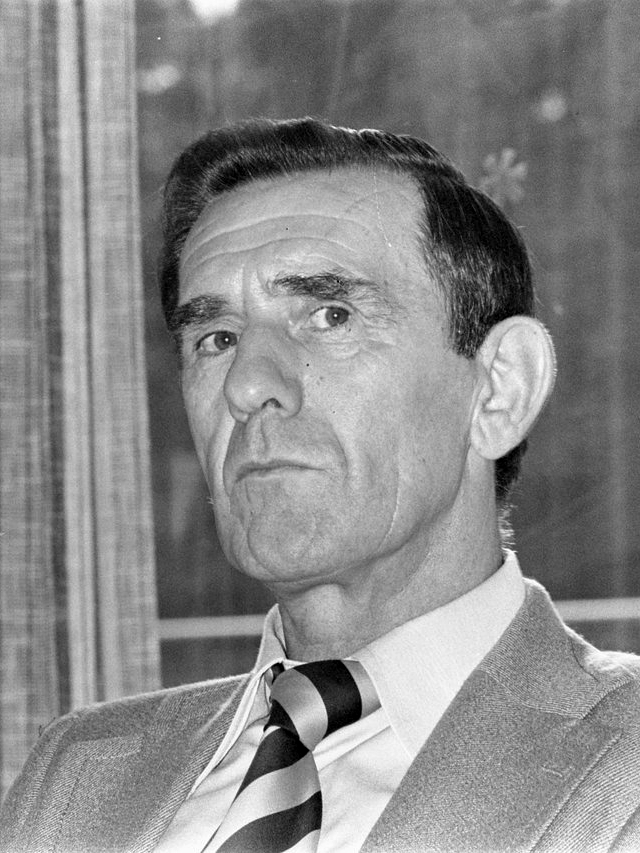
- Knobel in 1977

Personal information
- Date of birth: 10 December 1922
- Place of birth: Roosendaal, Netherlands
- Date of death: 5 May 2012 (aged 89)
- Place of death: Roosendaal, Netherlands

Managerial career
- Years: Team
- 1966–1969: VV Baronie
- 1969–1973: MVV
- 1973–1974: Ajax
- 1974–1976: Netherlands
- 1976–1978: MVV
- 1978–1979: Beerschot
- 1980: Beerschot
- 1980–1981: Hong Kong
- 1981: Seiko
- 1982: MVV (caretaker)
- 1985: Seiko
- 1989: Terengganu FA
- 1996-2000: RBC

George Knobel (10 December 1922 – 5 May 2012) was a Dutch football manager.

Knobel was born and died in Roosendaal. He was the coach of the Netherlands national team for 15 matches (9 wins, 1 draw, 5 losses) from 1974 to 1976. During his period the Dutch finished third at the European Championship of 1976. He also coached Dutch clubs AFC Ajax and MVV, including a temporary spell from March to April 1982. He had a brief stint with Seiko SA in Hong Kong.
