= Koo Luam Khen =

Malaysian footballer (born 1951)

Koo Luam Khen (or Khoo Luan Khen, simplified Chinese: 古廉权; traditional Chinese: 古廉權, born 27 March 1951) is a Malaysian former footballer. A Malaysia national team player, he participated in the 1972 Munich Olympic Games. He was the former coach of Hong Kong national team, Hong Kong League teams Instant-Dict and Sun Hei. He won "Best Coach of the Year" in Hong Kong Top Footballer Awards 2003 and 2005.

In 2004, he was inducted in Olympic Council of Malaysia's Hall of Fame for 1972 Summer Olympics football team.

In early 2013, Koo coached the Northern Mariana Islands team in the 2014 AFC Challenge Cup qualification tournament in Nepal.
