= Veronica Chan =

Hong Konger football executive (1922–2025)

- 陳瑤琴
- Born: 26 September 1922; Hong Kong
- Died: 31 May 2025 (aged 102); Tin Shui Wai, Hong Kong
- Other name: Veronica Chiu Chan Yiu-kam (趙陳瑤琴)
- Occupation: Football executive
- Known for: Co-founder of the Asian Ladies Football Confederation
- Spouse: Bertcham Chiu But-york (m. 1954; died 1998)

Veronica Chan Yiu-kam MBE (Chinese: 陳瑤琴), or Veronica Chiu Chan Yiu-kam (趙陳瑤琴), was a Hong Kong football executive known for establishing the Hong Kong Ladies Football Association and the Asian Ladies Football Confederation, the latter of which established the tournament which is now known as the AFC Women's Asian Cup.

== Early life ==
Veronica Chan was born in Hong Kong on 26 September 1922. Chan showed interest in football at a young age preferring to play with her six brothers than her sisters.

== Career ==
Veronica Chan founded the Hong Kong Ladies Football Association in 1965. Three years later, Chan co-founded the Asian Ladies Football Confederation (ALFC). ALFC, However remained dormant until 1974 when it was revived by Chan along with Datin Teoh Chye Hin of Malaysia and Charles Pereira of Singapore.

The Asian Ladies Football Cup, which is now known as the AFC Women's Asian Cup, was then organized in 1975 in Hong Kong. Chan is also credited with Hong Kong's hosting of the Asian Women's Football Championship in 1981, 1986, and 1989. She also oversaw the merger of the Asian Ladies Football Federation with the Asian Football Confederation (AFC) in the 1980s. She was head of the AFC's women's football committee until 2002.

Chan was also involved in men's football, supporting numerous Hong Kong clubs such as Yuen Long, Rangers, Caroline Hill and Sea Bee. She was the first owner to introduce European players to Hong Kong clubs.

== Death and legacy ==
Chan died on 31 May 2025 at her residence in Tin Shui Wai. The Asian Football Confederation recognized Chan as the "mother of Asian women's football" in 2003.

== Personal life ==
Chan was married to Bertcham Chiu But-york from 1954 until Chiu's death in 1998. Chan's ancestors are from Fujian in mainland China. She was also a Protestant Christian.
