= Ian McWilliams =

Scottish footballer (1952–2004)

Ian Alfred McWilliams
- McWilliams with Seiko

Personal information
- Full name: Ian A. McWilliams
- Date of birth: 2 February 1952
- Place of birth: Glasgow, United Kingdom
- Date of death: 3 May 2004 (aged 52)
- Height: 6 ft 6 in (1.98 m)
- Position: Center back

Senior career*
| Years | Team | Apps | (Gls) |
| 1976–1977 | Queen's Park | | |
| 1977–1978 | Celtic | 4 | (0) |
| 1978–1981 | Seiko | | |
| 1981 | Blackpool | 1 | (0) |
| 1981–??? | Rutherglen Glencairn | | |
- * Club domestic league appearances and goals

Ian A. McWilliams (02 February 1952 – 3 May 2004) was a Scottish footballer. He was known for his extraordinary height and his brief stint with Celtic in the late 1970s.

== Career ==
McWilliams would initially serve as a police cadet before signing with Queen's Park. In a surprise decision, Celtic would take interest in the footballer and would sign him as a free transfer alongside Roy Kay. He was immediately known for his enormous height at six feet and five inches as he would be recognized as being the tallest British footballer at the time and currently holds the record for being the tallest player to play for Celtic. He would make his debut in a 5–0 victory against Jeunesse Esch during the 1977–78 European Cup. However, the 1977–78 Celtic F.C. season was a difficult time for newcomers for the club as neither McWilliams nor Kay would make much of an impression with the club. This was due to how in the course of his three domestic league appearances with the club, Celtic would earn just a single point with his final one being a 2–0 victory against St Mirren on 16 November 1977.

Following his spell with Celtic, he would travel abroad to play for Hong Kong based club Seiko on 12 August 1978. He found better success over there until he would briefly play for Blackpool as he would win a trial before playing the rest of his career with Rutherglen Glencairn.

Beginning in 1996, McWilliams began suffering from Non-Hodgkins Lymphoma as he would have an eight-year long battle with the disease before succumbing to it on 3 May 2004.
