= 1972–73 Hong Kong First Division League =

Hong Kong First Division
- Season: 1972–73
- Champions: Seiko
- Relegated: Sing Tao; KMB
- Matches played: 182
- Goals scored: 616 (3.38 per match)

The 1972–73 Hong Kong First Division League season was the 62nd since its establishment.

== League table ==
Pos	Team	Pld	W	D	L	GF	GA	GD	Pts
1	Seiko (C)	26	18	4	4	71	35	+36	40
2	South China	26	17	6	3	53	27	+26	40
3	Tung Sing	26	14	7	5	70	36	+34	35
4	Fire Services	26	13	7	6	57	44	+13	33
5	Happy Valley	26	13	4	9	49	30	+19	30
6	Mackinnons	26	11	6	9	37	30	+7	28
7	Caroline Hill	26	9	8	9	34	35	−1	26
8	Rangers	26	9	7	10	43	47	−4	25
9	Telephone	26	8	7	11	33	40	−7	23
10	Yuen Long	26	7	6	13	29	44	−15	20
11	Eastern	26	8	4	14	42	66	−24	20
12	Police	26	7	4	15	38	52	−14	18
13	Sing Tao (R)	26	6	3	17	35	59	−24	15
14	KMB (R)	26	4	3	19	25	71	−46	11

Source: rsssf.com
(C) Champions; (R) Relegated
