= HKFA Chairman's Cup =

The Hong Kong Football Association Chairman's Cup (Chinese: 香港足球總會主席盃) was established by HKFA in 1975. It is now a competition for the reserve teams of Hong Kong First Division clubs.

== Past winners ==
Edition	Season	Winner	Score	Runner–up	Remarks
1	1975–76	South China			
2	1976–77	Seiko	3–1 aet	Happy Valley	
3	1977–78	Seiko			The matches were held in 7-vs-7 format
4	1978–79	Seiko			
5	1979–80	Happy Valley			
6	1980–81	South China Reserves			The matches started to be joined by reserve teams in this season
7	1981–82	South China Reserves			
8	1982–83	Seiko Reserves			
9	1983–84	Happy Valley Reserves			
10	1984–85	South China Reserves			
11	1985–86	South China Reserves			
12	1986–87	South China			Competed by youth teams of First Division League teams
13	1987–88	Double Flower			Competed by youth teams of First Division League teams
14	1988–89	Lai Sun Double Flower Reserves			
15	1989–90	Eastern Reserves			
16	1990–91	Eastern Reserves			
17	1991–92	Eastern Reserves			
18	1992–93	Eastern Reserves			
19	1993–94	Sing Tao Reserves			
20	1994–95	Instant-Dict. Reserves			
21	1995–96	Instant-Dict. Reserves			
22	1996–97	Golden Reserves			
23	1997–98	Instant-Dict. Reserves			
24	1998–99	Sai Kung Friends Reserves			
25	1999–2000	South China Reserves			
26	2000–01	Orient & Yee Hope Union Reserves			
27	2001–02	Double Flower Reserves			
28	2002–03	South China Reserves			
29	2003–04	Sun Hei Reserves			
30	2004–05	South China Reserves			
31	2005–06	Buler Rangers Reserves	1–0	South China Reserves	
32	2006–07	Citizen Reserves	2–1	South China Reserves	
33	2007–08	Bulova Rangers Reserves	8–3	Eastern Reserves	
