= 2005–06 HKFA Chairman's Cup =

Hong Kong Football Association Chairman's Cup 2005-06 is the 31st staging of the competition. The reserve teams of 6 First Division League clubs entered the competition.

Buler Rangers Reserve captured the champion by winning South China Reserve by 1-0 in the final.

== Bracket ==
All times are Hong Kong Time (UTC+8).

=== Bracket ===
First Round
Kitchee Reserve	1
Buler Rangers Reserve	3
Xiangxue Sun Hei Reserve	1
South China Reserve	6

Semi Final
Citizen Reserve	0
Buler Rangers Reserve	2
Happy Valley Reserve	0
South China Reserve	2

Final
Buler Rangers Reserve	1
South China Reserve	0

=== First round ===
Match 1
13 March 2006
18:30

Kitchee Reserve	1 - 3	Buler Rangers Reserve
Cheung Tsz Kin (yellow card) 60'; Wong Siu Kwan 68'	(in Chinese)	Wu Jun (yellow card) 13'; Marcio Anacleto 33'; Lo Kwan Yee (yellow card) 53'; Man Pei Tak (yellow card) 73'; Lo Kwan Yee 79'; Chan Siu Yuen (yellow card) 80'; Marcio Anacleto (yellow card) 81'; Fan Weijun 85'

Ma On Shan Recreation Ground

Match 2
13 March 2006
20:30

Xiangxue Sun Hei Reserve	1 - 6	South China Reserve
Chu Siu Kei 14'	(in Chinese)	Cheng Siu Wai 1'; Au Wai Lun 9' 18' 40'; Cheung Wai Shing 31'; Luk Koon Pong 65'

Ma On Shan Recreation Ground

=== Semi-finals ===
SF1
27 March 2006
18:30

Buler Rangers Reserve	2 - 0	Citizen Reserve
Man Pei Tak (yellow card) 33'; Wong Chin Hung 37'; Lo Kwan Yee 39'; Marcio Anacleto (yellow card) 64'		Wang Zhengchuang (yellow card) 24'; Lo Chun Kit (yellow card) 43'; Yaw Anane (yellow card) 84'

Ma On Shan Recreation Ground

SF2
27 March 2006
20:30

Happy Valley Reserve	0 - 2	South China Reserve
Poon Yiu Cheuk (yellow card) 22'; Sui Weijie (red card) 90'		Leung Shing Kit 23' (PEN.); Chen Qian (yellow card) 36'; Cheng Siu Wai 44'

Ma On Shan Recreation Ground

=== Final ===
Final
17 April 2006
18:30

Buler Rangers Reserve	1 - 0	South China Reserve
Leung Chi Kui ?'	(in Chinese)

Kowloon Bay Sports Ground

== Top goalscorers ==
3 goals

- (Hong Kong) Au Wai Lun of South China Reserve

2 goals

- (Hong Kong) Cheng Siu Wai of South China Reserve
- (Hong Kong) Lo Kwan Yee of Buler Rangers Reserve

1 goal

- (Hong Kong) Chu Siu Kei of Xiangxue Sun Hei Reserve
- (Hong Kong) Leung Shing Kit of South China Reserve
- (Hong Kong) Luk Koon Pong of South China Reserve
- (Hong Kong) Cheung Wai Shing of South China Reserve
- (Hong Kong) Wong Siu Kwan of Kitchee Reserve
- (Hong Kong) Wong Chin Hung of Buler Rangers Reserve
- (China) Fan Weijun of Buler Rangers Reserve
- (Brazil) Marcio Aanacleto of Buler Rangers Reserve
- (Hong Kong) Leung Chi Kui of Buler Rangers Reserve

== See also ==
- HKFA Website 2005/2006 HKFA Chairman's Cup
