= Gao Brothers =

Chinese artists in Shandong, China

Chrome bust of Mao (small) standing on top of Russian Communist leader Vladimir Lenin. Sculpture by the Gao Brothers

The Gao Brothers are two Chinese artists named Gao Zhen (高兟, b. 1956) and Gao Qiang (高强, b. 1962) from Jinan, in the province of Shandong (located in the north east of China).

Their works tend to be charged with political and social nuances, including their recurring use of Mao's image. Gao Zhen, the elder of the brothers, explained through an interpreter that "1968 was a crucial moment in the Cultural revolution, where political 'cleaning' took place. Our father, a simple laborer was thrown into jail. We still don’t know if he actually committed suicide as the authorities told us or if he was killed during his incarceration". At that time, Gao Zhen was 12 years old and Gao Qiang was 6.

A retrospective of their work, "Gao Brothers : Grandeur and Catharsis", was organized by the Kemper Museum from September 17, 2010, to 2011, January 2. A brief presentation of their work shows the multifaceted nature of their art: the brothers combine diverse mediums such as painting, sculpture, performance, and photography. They currently work in the artists district called 798 Art Zone in the Dashanzi Art District, and their work is internationally recognized. Following his arrest in Beijing in mid-2024, in 2026 Gao Zhen was secretly put on trial in China.

== Biography ==
Both brothers were introduced to Chinese traditional art before they began their college studies. The older brother graduated from Shandong Academy of Fine Arts and the younger brother from Qufu Normal University (Qufu is said to be the hometown of the thinker, educator and politician Confucius).

The notion of "brotherhood", inspired by their own relationship, is at times embedded in their works as a message for all humanity. In 2002, the Gao Brothers left Shandong to settle in Beijing.

Their art is protean, they refuse to be limited to only one medium, what is most important is the message at hand they are attempting to convey through their work.

On August 26, 2024, while visiting the country with his family, Gao Zhen was detained by Chinese authorities under a law against "attacking the reputation and honor of heroes and martyrs". He was reported in October 2025 to be in failing health after fainting the previous month. Human Rights Watch called for the Chinese government to release him. In March 2026 he was put on trial for "insulting revolutionary heroes and martyrs," and in August 2026 he was sentenced to three years in prison.

== Art ==
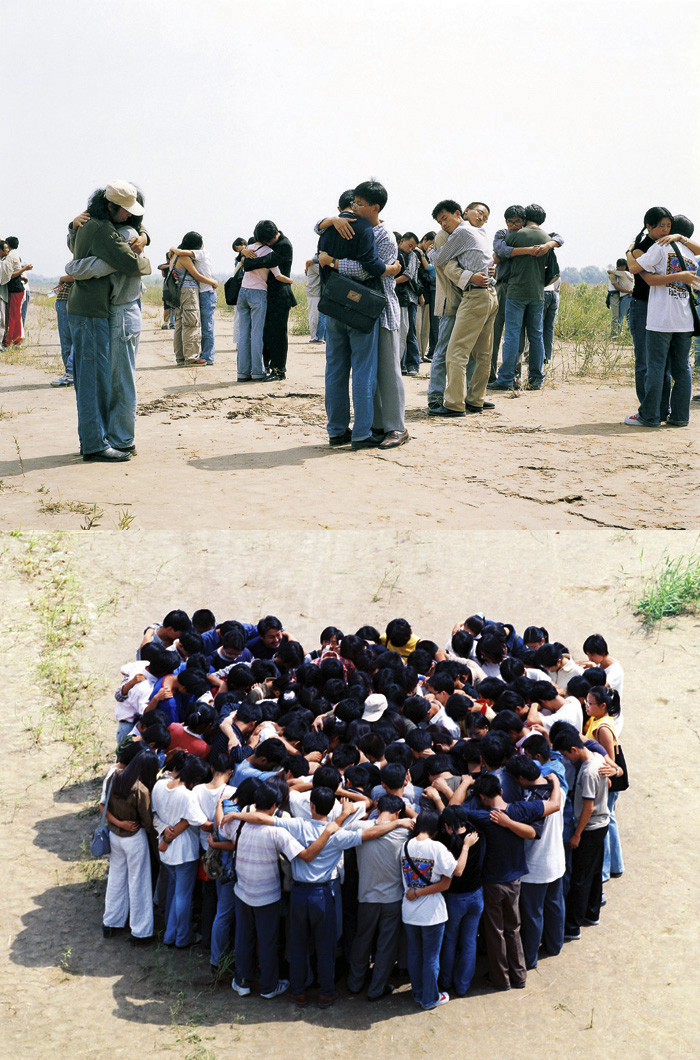

=== Sculptures ===
==== Midnight Mass ====
The Gao Brothers started their career in 1989 via a collective exhibition organized at the National Art Museum of China (NAMOC) where they exhibited their piece Midnight Mass, an inflatable installation representing a hermaphrodite sexual organ measuring 4 meters high. Midnight Mass borrows from surrealism the technique of the body's fragmentation and the notion of the "Anatomy of desire" from Hans Bellmer. However, both the material used (inflatable plastic) and the dimensions of the work bring it into the realm of contemporary art.

==== Miss Mao ====
With her large breasts and her long nose, Miss Mao, Mao Zedong's monumental icon, appears as a hybridization of Minnie and Pinocchio. She is a grotesque image of a monstrous mother figure and a liar. As Claude Hudelot and Guy Gallice, show in their book, The Mao, the abundant iconography of Mao spans 60 years of Chinese folk art, depicting tirelessly the images of worship of the Great Helmsman. Given the escalation of propaganda and the power of the image used in advertising, artists are left with a natural choice to divert and distort these images, often in an exaggerated and grotesque manner. In 2006, the Gao Brothers had a solo exhibition at the Krampf-Pai Gallery (Krampf Gallery) in New York, USA entitled "Miss Mao - Gao Brothers Photography Exhibition."

==== The Execution of Christ ====
In 2009, the Gao Brothers turned towards working with bronze. The execution of Christ consists of bronze statues of seven soldiers shooting Christ. The sculpture of Mao with a gun was made in 1964, April 28. This parable refers to the concept developed by Nicolas Bourriaud known as "alter-modernity" Bourriaud, that begins with the idea that today's artists live in a globalized culture that should be used not to deny their individuality but to create a new modernity - one made of openness and intercultural exchange. The execution of Christ illustrates this concept as it combines two fundamentally different cultures while preserving one another.

==== Miss Mao Trying to Poise Herself at the Top of Lenin’s Head ====
One sculpture made by the brothers, titled Miss Mao Trying to Poise Herself at the Top of Lenin’s Head, depicts a tiny Mao Zedong standing atop a large bust of Vladimir Lenin while holding a balancing pole. In 2022, the statue was put on exhibition in San Antonio, Texas. In 2022 the sculpture was damaged by explosives. An attorney from Florida, who also tried to bomb the Chinese Embassy in Washington, D.C. in 2023, pleaded guilty to the bombings. Despite the statue being satirical, he was motivated by distrust of the Chinese government, which he blamed for the COVID-19 pandemic.

=== Paintings ===
==== If time reversed, Memory – 1989 ====
The firing of Hu Yaobang and his disappearance encouraged the students’ protest at Tiananmen on April 21, 1989 (Tiananmen Square protests of 1989). The demonstrations lasted until the beginning of June, when authorities decided to repress the revolt. The Chinese army repression on June 4, 1989, drew national and international attention. Numerous arrests were made.

The Gao Brothers painted a kind of memorial in honor of the victims. An open hand, a hole at its center representing a bloody wound, now stands in front of Tiananmen Square. Victims of the 1989 repression have been depicted as martyrs sacrificed for the cause of democracy. Across the hand's palm a red Forbidden City appears on a yellow background.

=== Photography and international reputation ===
==== Sense of Space series ====
The Gao brother's series Sense of Space depicts the authors and other anonymous models, naked, locked in boxes labeled with titles such as "Prayer", "Waiting", "Anxiety" and "Pain". Contorted bodies attempt to enter into boxes too small for them.

=== Performances ===
==== From 2000: The Hug ====
For about ten years, the Gao Brothers have organized performances around the idea of hugging, a 15-minute couple embrace and then a collective embrace of 5 minutes occurs. Some models are dressed, others are naked. Since 2000, nearly 150 people, meeting each other for the first time through this experience, have embraced each other through organized meetings of this sort.
