= Lothar Schneider =

German footballer

Personal information
- Full name: Lothar Schneider
- Date of birth: 3 December 1953 (age 72)
- Place of birth: Germany
- Position: Midfielder

Youth career
- –1972: MSV Duisburg

Senior career*
Years	Team	Apps	(Gls)
1972–1976	MSV Duisburg	48	(2)
1976–1978	Tennis Borussia Berlin	68	(9)
Total		116	(11)
- * Club domestic league appearances and goals

Lothar Schneider (born 3 December 1953) is a former professional German footballer.

Schneider made a total of 81 appearances in the Fußball-Bundesliga for MSV Duisburg and Tennis Borussia Berlin during his playing career.
