= 1977–78 Scottish Premier Division =

72nd season of top-tier football league in Scotland

Scottish Premier Division
- Season: 1977–78
- Champions: Rangers; 2nd Premier Division title 37th Scottish title
- Relegated: Ayr United; Clydebank
- European Cup: Rangers
- UEFA Cup: Hibernian; Dundee United
- Cup Winners' Cup: Aberdeen
- Matches: 180
- Goals: 508 (2.82 per match)
- Top goalscorer: (Scotland) Derek Johnstone (25)

The 1977–78 Scottish Premier Division season was won by Rangers, two points ahead of Aberdeen. Ayr United and Clydebank were relegated.

== Table ==
Pos	Team	Pld	W	D	L	GF	GA	GD	Pts	Qualification or relegation
1	Rangers (C)	36	24	7	5	76	39	+37	55	Qualification for the European Cup first round
2	Aberdeen	36	22	9	5	68	29	+39	53	Qualification for the Cup Winners' Cup first round
3	Dundee United	36	16	8	12	42	32	+10	40	Qualification for the UEFA Cup first round
4	Hibernian	36	15	7	14	51	43	+8	37	Qualification for the UEFA Cup first round
5	Celtic	36	15	6	15	63	54	+9	36	
6	Motherwell	36	13	7	16	45	52	−7	33	
7	Partick Thistle	36	14	5	17	52	62	−10	33	
8	St Mirren	36	11	8	17	52	63	−11	30	
9	Ayr United (R)	36	9	6	21	36	68	−32	24	Relegation to the 1978–79 Scottish First Division
10	Clydebank (R)	36	6	7	23	23	64	−41	19	Relegation to the 1978–79 Scottish First Division

Source: Statto
Rules for classification: 1) points; 2) goal difference; 3) number of goals scored.
(C) Champions; (R) Relegated

== Results ==
=== Matches 1–18 ===
During matches 1–18 each team plays every other team twice (home and away).

Home \ Away	ABE	AYR	CEL	CLY	DNU	HIB	MOT	PAR	RAN	STM
Aberdeen		0–0	2–1	1–1	0–0	1–2	4–1	2–1	3–1	3–1
Ayr United	0–1		2–1	2–0	0–2	0–1	1–1	1–2	0–5	3–2
Celtic	3–2	3–2		1–0	0–0	3–1	0–1	3–0	1–1	1–2
Clydebank	1–3	0–2	1–1		0–3	1–0	2–1	0–4	0–3	2–2
Dundee United	0–1	3–1	1–2	4–0		2–0	3–2	2–2	0–1	2–1
Hibernian	2–0	1–2	1–1	2–0	0–0		0–0	2–3	0–1	2–0
Motherwell	1–1	5–0	2–3	2–1	0–0	1–0		3–0	1–4	0–3
Partick Thistle	1–0	2–2	1–0	1–0	2–1	1–0	1–0		0–4	2–1
Rangers	3–1	2–0	3–2	4–1	2–0	0–2	3–1	3–3		2–1
St Mirren	0–4	2–0	3–3	1–1	0–1	3–0	1–0	2–1	3–3	

Legend: Blue = home team win; Yellow = draw; Red = away team win.

==== Matches 19–36 ====
Home \ Away	ABE	AYR	CEL	CLY	DNU	HIB	MOT	PAR	RAN	STM
Aberdeen		4–1	2–1	2–0	1–0	3–0	5–0	2–1	4–0	4–2
Ayr United	1–1		2–1	0–0	0–1	2–0	0–1	1–3	2–5	0–1
Celtic	2–2	3–0		5–2	1–0	2–1	0–1	5–2	2–0	1–2
Clydebank	0–1	0–2	3–2		2–0	0–3	0–2	2–0	0–2	2–2
Dundee United	0–0	1–0	0–1	1–0		1–1	1–1	5–2	0–1	2–1
Hibernian	1–1	4–2	4–1	2–0	3–1		2–1	3–1	1–1	5–1
Motherwell	0–0	3–0	2–1	0–1	0–1	2–4		2–0	3–5	1–0
Partick Thistle	0–2	4–1	0–4	0–0	0–2	2–1	2–3		1–2	5–0
Rangers	0–3	1–1	3–1	1–0	3–0	0–0	2–0	2–1		1–1
St Mirren	1–2	2–3	3–1	2–0	1–2	3–0	1–1	1–1	0–2	

Legend: Blue = home team win; Yellow = draw; Red = away team win.

== Awards ==
Award	Winner	Club
PFA Players' Player of the Year	(Scotland) Derek Johnstone	Rangers
PFA Young Player of the Year	(Scotland) Graeme Payne	Dundee United
SFWA Footballer of the Year	(Scotland) Derek Johnstone	Rangers
