= Joe Filippi =

Scottish footballer

Personal information
- Full name: Joseph Filippi
- Date of birth: 3 November 1953 (age 72)
- Place of birth: Irvine, Scotland
- Position: Defender

Senior career*
Years	Team	Apps	(Gls)
1969–1970	Coventry City	0	(0)
1970–1977	Ayr United	187	(10)
1977–1979	Celtic	32	(0)
1979–1981	Clyde	54	(0)
1981–?	Glenafton Athletic		
Total		273	(10)
- * Club domestic league appearances and goals

Joseph Filippi (born 3 November 1953 in Ayrshire), is a Scottish retired football defender.

Filippi began his career with hometown club Ayr United, staying with the Honest Men for eight years. He had a yearlong spell at Celtic, before joining Glasgow neighbours Clyde. He dropped out of the senior game in 1981.
