= Ernst Savkovic =

German footballer

Personal information
- Full name: Ernst Savkovic
- Date of birth: 23 August 1953 (age 73)
- Place of birth: Heppenheim, West Germany
- Height: 1.68 m (5 ft 6 in)
- Position: Defender

Youth career
- –1970: FC Sportfreunde Heppenheim
- 1970–: Kickers Offenbach
- –1972: MSV Duisburg

Senior career*
Years	Team	Apps	(Gls)
1972–1974	MSV Duisburg	21	(0)
1974–1976	Borussia Dortmund	53	(0)
1976–1978	Tennis Borussia Berlin	42	(0)
1979–1980	Rot-Weiß Oberhausen	33	(0)
Total		149	(0)
- * Club domestic league appearances and goals

Ernst Savkovic (born 23 August 1953) is a former professional German footballer.

Savkovic made 50 appearances in the Bundesliga during his playing career.
