= Hans-Georg Kraus =

German footballer

Personal information
- Full name: Hans-Georg Kraus
- Date of birth: 25 October 1949
- Place of birth: Germany
- Date of death: 25 July 2020 (aged 70)
- Position: Defender

Senior career*
Years	Team	Apps	(Gls)
1972–1974	Fortuna Düsseldorf	9	(0)
1974–1978	Tennis Borussia Berlin	80	(1)
Total		89	(1)
- * Club domestic league appearances and goals

Hans-Georg Kraus (25 October 1949 – 25 July 2020) was a professional German footballer.

Kraus made 37 appearances in the Fußball-Bundesliga for Fortuna Düsseldorf and Tennis Borussia Berlin during his playing career.
