= Caroline Hill FC =

Caroline Hill
- Full name: Caroline Hill Football Club
- Nickname: 車房班 Autoworkers
- Founded: 1950s
- Dissolved: 2010s
Home colours	Away colours

Caroline Hill Football Club (Chinese: 加山足球隊) was a Hong Kong football club which hold associate membership in the Hong Kong Football Association. The club formerly participated in the Hong Kong First Division but were relegated in 1982 and have not returned to the top flight since. Following relegation from the Hong Kong Third A Division League in the 2001–02 season, the club has not fielded a senior men's side in the Hong Kong football league system.

== History ==
=== Formation ===
Caroline Hill was founded in the 1950s by a group of auto shop workers based in Caroline Hill Road, hence they are nicknamed the "Autoworkers". The club was promoted for the first time in 1956–57 as Hong Kong Third Division champions. Two years later, the club won the Hong Kong Second Division title and were promoted into the Hong Kong First Division.

=== 1960s ===
In 1961–62, Caroline Hill finished last in the First Division and were thus relegated. A strong rebound by the club the following year led to a Second Division title and a return to the top flight. However, their success was short-lived, as the club finished second last in the 1963-64 First Division table and were relegated.

After finishing runners up in the 1967-68 Second Division, the club returned to the First Division. Once again, the club finished second last in the First Division and were immediately relegated.

=== 1970s ===
In 1970–71, the club completed a runners up finish and were promoted back to the top flight. This time however, they stayed there for a decade and enjoyed their greatest run of success. Under the financial support of chairman Chan Yiu Kam, Caroline Hill placed runners up in the 1971-72 First Division, their highest league finish to date.

Caroline Hill captured their first major trophy in 1973, defeating Seiko in the Golden Jubilee Cup Final.

Four years later, the club once again defeated Seiko, this time in the 1977 Viceroy Cup Final to win their second major trophy. Caroline Hill player Xuan Hudson shared the Best Attacking Player Award in that game with Seiko player Wu Kwok Hung.

=== 1980s ===
Caroline Hill would return to cup finals in latter years but were unable to come out victorious. In 1980, they lost 2–1 to South China in the Viceroy Cup final though right winger Deng Jiandong and keeper Liu Chun Fai were voted Best Attacking Player and Best Defending Player respectively. The club suffered heartbreak again the 1981 Viceroy Cup Final, this time losing 7–6 on penalties to Eastern. Liu Chun Fai won his second consecutive Best Defender Award despite the defeat.

In 1981–82, mired in a relegation battle with South China, both clubs were involved in a crucial match at the South China AA Stadium. The match took place on 16 April 1982, with a record 27,957 filled the stadium with most arriving early in the morning. The match ended in a 0–0 draw, leaving both teams tied near the bottom of the table with 13 points. South China fans, unhappy with their club's league performance, rioted outside the stadium in the biggest civil disorder in Hong Kong since the 1967 Leftist riots.

Desperately sensing the need for improvements to his squad, Chan Yiu Kam turned to England for help. He acquired the likes of Mick Channon, Steve Williams, David Armstrong and Mark Wright on loan Southampton F.C. in a desperate attempt to help salvage the club's fleeting hopes of remaining in the top flight. However, the home tie versus South China ended in a 4–1 loss, all but sealing their fate. In the end, Caroline Hill finished one point behind them, in 10th place, resulting in relegation to the Second Division.

=== 2000s ===
In 2001–02, Caroline Hill finished last in the Hong Kong Third A Division League and by rule, were not allowed to enter a team in the Hong Kong football league system the following year. The club has not fielded a senior men's team since.

=== 2010s ===
Caroline Hill fielded a women's side in the Hong Kong Women League. They operated academy sides for youth players.

== Honours ==
=== League ===
- Hong Kong First Division
  - Runners-up (1): 1971–72
- Hong Kong Second Division
  - Champions (2): 1959–60, 1962–63
  - Runners-up (2): 1967–68, 1970–71
- Hong Kong Third Division
  - Champions (1): 1956–57

=== Cup ===
- Golden Jubilee Cup
  - Champions (1): 1972–73
- Viceroy Cup
  - Champions (1): 1976–77
  - Runners-up (2): 1979–80, 1980–11
