= Klaus-Günter Stade =

German footballer

Personal information
- Full name: Klaus-Günter Stade
- Date of birth: 24 May 1953 (age 73)
- Place of birth: Germany
- Position: Striker

Senior career*
Years	Team	Apps	(Gls)
1976–1977	Tennis Borussia Berlin	3	(0)
- * Club domestic league appearances and goals

Klaus-Günter Stade (born 24 May 1953) is a German former professional footballer.

Stade made a total of 3 appearances in the Fußball-Bundesliga for Tennis Borussia Berlin during his playing career.
