= Yu Ho Pong =

Hong Kong footballer (born 1989)

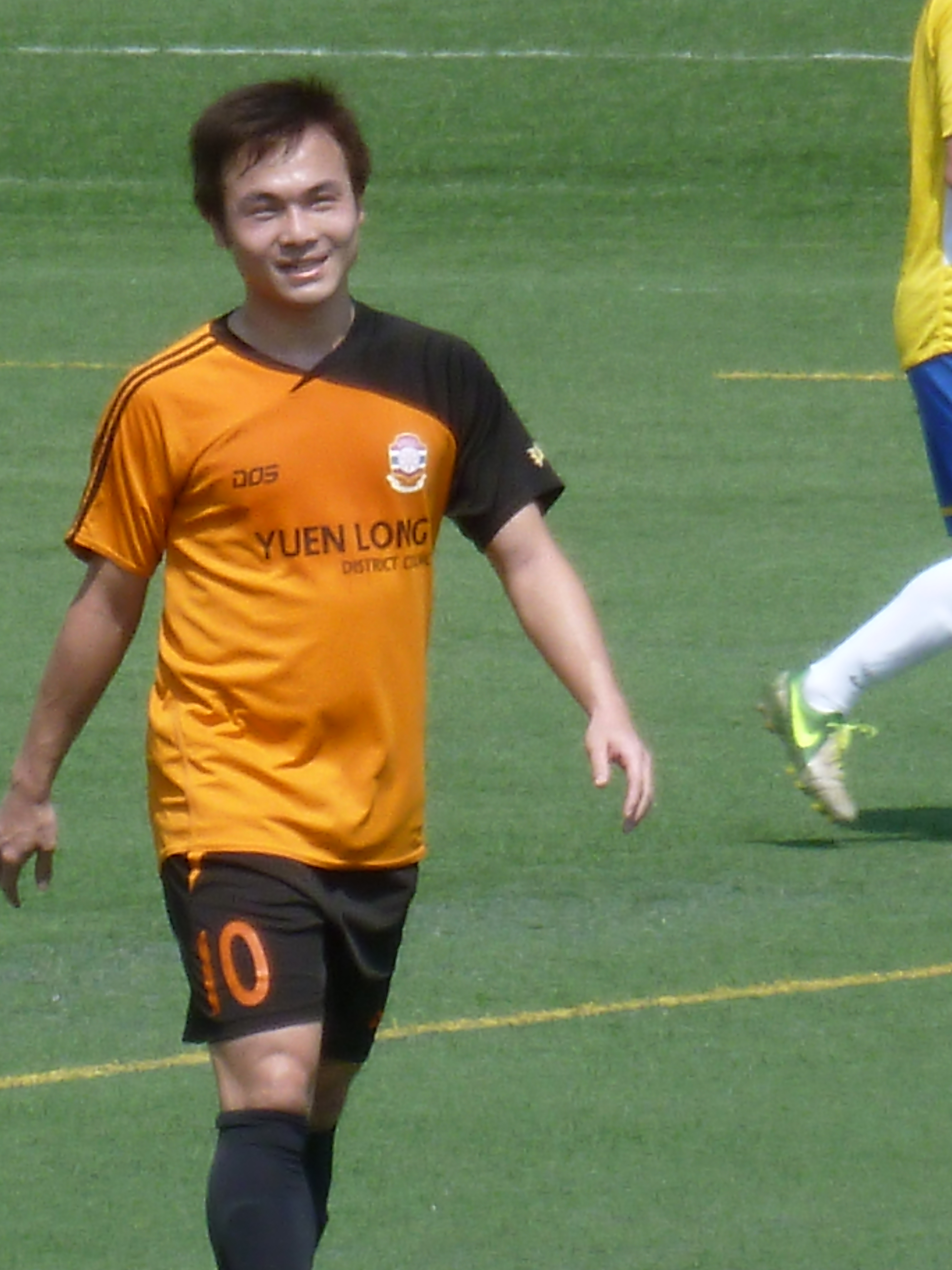

Personal information
- Full name: Yu Ho Pong
- Date of birth: 19 August 1989 (age 37)
- Place of birth: Hong Kong
- Height: 1.69 m (5 ft 6 1/2 in)
- Position: Striker

Senior career*
Years	Team	Apps	(Gls)
2004–2005	HKSSF		
2005–2006	Hong Kong 09		(2)
2006–2007	Hong Kong 08	5	(1)
2007–2009	Eastern	9	(3)
2009–2010	Happy Valley	12	(0)
2010–2011	Sun Hei	11	(1)
2011–2015	Yuen Long	37	(7)
2015–2016	Wan Chai	23	(3)
2016–2019	Metro Gallery	71	(18)
2019	Yau Tsim Mong	3	(1)
2019–2020	Double Flower	11	(9)
2020–2022	Leaper	21	(7)
2022–2023	Tung Sing	20	(5)
2023–2024	Tuen Mun	16	(2)

International career
- Hong Kong U-20
- Hong Kong U-23
- * Club domestic league appearances and goals

Yu Ho Pong (Chinese: 余浩邦; Jyutping: jyu^{4} hou^{6} bong^{1}, born 19 August 1989) is a Hong Kong former professional footballer who played as a striker. He is also an officer in the Hong Kong Correctional Services Department

== Club career ==
=== Eastern ===
Yu first joined Eastern back in 2008 as an attacker for the squad. He quickly worked his way to a starting position on the first team and followed it up with a first goal, quickly succeeding by a second.

=== Happy Valley ===
After a year of intense training and foundation building at Eastern, Yu was contacted for a contract by Happy Valley. He signed for a year, and his progress is being reviewed for a further renewal of his current contract. Yu has made 12 appearances for the club, 7 being in the starting line up. Yu has played a total of 641 minutes for the club and has received 2 yellow cards.
