= Detlef Pirsig =

German footballer and manager (1945–2019)

Personal information
- Full name: Detlef Pirsig
- Date of birth: 22 October 1945
- Place of birth: Schwerin, Germany
- Date of death: 9 December 2019 (aged 74)
- Place of death: Mülheim, Germany
- Height: 1.80 m (5 ft 11 in)
- Position: Defender

Senior career*
Years	Team	Apps	(Gls)
1965–1977	MSV Duisburg	337	(0)
1982–1984	BV Lüttringhausen	48	(4)

Managerial career
- –1982: BV Lüttringhausen (Player-manager)
- 1984–1986: Wuppertaler SV
- 1986–1989: MSV Duisburg
- 1989–1993: BV Lüttringhausen/FC Remscheid
- 1993–1994: Schwarz-Weiß Essen
- 1994–1998: FC Remscheid
- 1998–1999: FC Wegberg-Beeck
- * Club domestic league appearances and goals

Detlef Pirsig (22 October 1945 – 9 December 2019) was a German football player and manager. He played in 385 matches, primarily with MSV Duisburg.

Pirsig died on 9 December 2019 at the age of 74.
