= 1977–78 Scottish League Cup =

Tournament details
- Country: Scotland

Final positions
- Champions: Rangers
- Runners-up: Celtic

The 1977–78 Scottish League Cup was the thirty-second season of Scotland's second football knockout competition. The competition was won by Rangers, who defeated Celtic in the Final.

== First round ==
=== First leg ===
Home team	Score	Away team	Date
Aberdeen	3–1	Airdrieonians	17 August 1977
Alloa Athletic	5–3	Stranraer	17 August 1977
Clydebank	5–0	East Fife	17 August 1977
Dundee United	5–0	Albion Rovers	17 August 1977
Hibernian	1–2	Queen of the South	17 August 1977
Montrose	1–3	Dundee	17 August 1977

=== Second leg ===
Home team	Score	Away team	Date	Agg
Airdrieonians	0–2	Aberdeen	24 August 1977	1–5
Albion Rovers	1–5	Dundee United	23 August 1977	1–10
Dundee	1–0	Montrose	24 August 1977	4–1
East Fife	0–1	Clydebank	24 August 1977	0–6
Queen of the South	0–0	Hibernian	24 August 1977	2–1
Stranraer	3–0	Alloa Athletic	24 August 1977	6–5

== Second round ==
=== First leg ===
Home team	Score	Away team	Date
Aberdeen	5–0	Cowdenbeath	31 August 1977
Ayr United	1–0	Queen's Park	30 August 1977
Celtic	0–0	Motherwell	31 August 1977
Clyde	0–0	Dunfermline Ath	29 August 1977
Clydebank	0–0	Stranraer	31 August 1977
Dumbarton	4–1	Hamilton Academical	31 August 1977
Dundee	4–0	Berwick Rangers	31 August 1977
East Stirlingshire	0–1	Stirling Albion	31 August 1977
Heart of Midlothian	1–0	Stenhousemuir	29 August 1977
Kilmarnock	0–0	St Mirren	31 August 1977
Meadowbank Thistle	2–2	Forfar Athletic	31 August 1977
Morton	0–0	Falkirk	31 August 1977
Partick Thistle	0–0	Dundee United	31 August 1977
Queen of the South	2–0	Brechin City	31 August 1977
Raith Rovers	0–1	Arbroath	31 August 1977
Rangers	3–1	St Johnstone	24 August 1977

=== Second leg ===
Home team	Score	Away team	Date	Agg
Arbroath	3–1	Raith Rovers	3 September 1977	4–1
Berwick Rangers	1–1	Dundee	3 September 1977	1–5
Brechin City	2–2	Queen of the South	3 September 1977	2–4
Cowdenbeath	0–5	Aberdeen	3 September 1977	0–10
Dundee United	1–0	Partick Thistle	3 September 1977	1–0
Dunfermline Ath	2–1	Clyde	3 September 1977	2–1
Falkirk	2–3	Morton	3 September 1977	2–3
Forfar Athletic	2–0	Meadowbank Thistle	3 September 1977	4–2
Hamilton Academical	6–0	Dumbarton	3 September 1977	7–4
Motherwell	2–4	Celtic	3 September 1977	2–4
Queen's Park	1–0	Ayr United	3 September 1977	1–1
St Johnstone	0–3	Rangers	3 September 1977	1–6
St Mirren	2–1	Kilmarnock	3 September 1977	2–1
Stenhousemuir	0–5	Heart of Midlothian	3 September 1977	0–6
Stirling Albion	0–0	East Stirlingshire	3 September 1977	1–0
Stranraer	0–1	Clydebank	3 September 1977	0–1

== Third round ==
=== First leg ===
Home team	Score	Away team	Date
Arbroath	0–4	Dundee United	5 October 1977
Ayr United	2–1	Forfar Athletic	5 October 1977
Dundee	0–0	Queen of the South	5 October 1977
Dunfermline Ath	2–0	Clydebank	5 October 1977
Hamilton Academical	0–2	St Mirren	5 October 1977
Heart of Midlothian	3–0	Morton	5 October 1977
Rangers	6–1	Aberdeen	5 October 1977
Stirling Albion	1–2	Celtic	5 October 1977

=== Second leg ===
Home team	Score	Away team	Date	Agg
Aberdeen	3–1	Rangers	26 October 1977	4–7
Celtic	1–1	Stirling Albion	26 October 1977	3–2
Clydebank	2–2	Dunfermline Ath	26 October 1977	2–4
Dundee United	2–1	Arbroath	26 October 1977	6–1
Forfar Athletic	3–1	Ayr United	26 October 1977	4–3
Morton	2–0	Heart of Midlothian	26 October 1977	2–3
Queen of the South	6–0	Dundee	26 October 1977	6–0
St Mirren	1–2	Hamilton Academical	26 October 1977	3–2

== Quarter-finals ==
=== First leg ===
Home team	Score	Away team	Date
Dundee United	3–1	Heart of Midlothian	9 November 1977
Queen of the South	3–3	Forfar Athletic	8 November 1977
Rangers	3–1	Dunfermline Ath	9 November 1977
St Mirren	1–3	Celtic	9 November 1977

=== Second leg ===
Home team	Score	Away team	Date	Agg
Celtic	2–0	St Mirren	16 November 1977	5–1
Dunfermline Ath	1–3	Rangers	16 November 1977	2–6
Forfar Athletic	1–0	Queen of the South	16 November 1977	4–3
Heart of Midlothian	2–0	Dundee United	16 November 1977	3–3

== Semi-finals ==
Home team	Score	Away team	Date
Celtic	2–0	Heart of Midlothian	1 March 1978
Rangers	5–2	Forfar Athletic	27 February 1978

== Final ==
18 March 1978

Rangers	2–1 (a.e.t.)	Celtic
Cooper; Smith		Edvaldsson

Hampden Park, Glasgow
Attendance: 60,168
