= 1983–84 Hong Kong First Division League =

Hong Kong First Division
- Season: 1983–84
- Champions: Seiko
- Matches played: 72
- Goals scored: 184 (2.56 per match)

The 1983–84 Hong Kong First Division League season was the 73rd since its establishment.

== League table ==
| Pos | Team | Pld | W | D | L | GF | GA | GD | Pts |
|---|---|---|---|---|---|---|---|---|---|
| 1 | Seiko (C) | 16 | 10 | 5 | 1 | 39 | 19 | +20 | 25 |
| 2 | Bulova (W) | 16 | 11 | 3 | 2 | 25 | 10 | +15 | 25 |
| 3 | Happy Valley | 16 | 8 | 4 | 4 | 23 | 12 | +11 | 20 |
| 4 | South China | 16 | 6 | 5 | 5 | 20 | 22 | −2 | 17 |
| 5 | Eastern | 16 | 4 | 8 | 4 | 23 | 17 | +6 | 16 |
| 6 | Tung Sing | 16 | 4 | 5 | 7 | 14 | 20 | −6 | 13 |
| 7 | Zindabad (W) | 16 | 4 | 3 | 9 | 19 | 20 | −1 | 11 |
| 8 | Rangers | 16 | 3 | 5 | 8 | 12 | 30 | −18 | 11 |
| 9 | Sea Bee | 16 | 1 | 4 | 11 | 9 | 34 | −25 | 6 |

Source: rsssf.com
(C) Champions; (W) Withdrew from the league system after the season.
