= Kwok Ka Ming =

Hong Kong footballer and coach

Kwok Ka Ming MBE
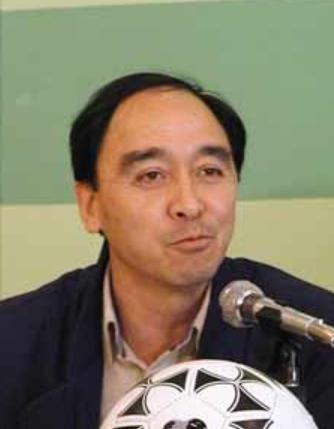

Personal information
- Date of birth: 30 October 1949 (age 76)
- Place of birth: British Hong Kong (Note: Ancestral hometown: Zhongshan city, Guangdong province)
- Position: Right winger

Senior career*
Years	Team	Apps	(Gls)
1968–1977	Hong Kong Rangers		
1977–1979	Caroline Hill		
1979–1980	Hong Kong Rangers		

International career
1968–1979	Hong Kong	47	(12)

Managerial career
- 1982–1990: Hong Kong
- 1997: Hong Kong
- 2000–2001: Instant-Dict
- * Club domestic league appearances and goals

Kwok Ka Ming MBE, JP (Chinese: 郭家明; Jyutping: gwok^{3} gaa^{1} ming^{4}, born 30 October 1949) is a former Hong Kong professional footballer and football coach.

== Early life ==
Kwok graduated from St. Francis Xavier's College, Tai Kok Tsui where he played in the school basketball and table tennis team. He joined the Hong Kong Football Association junior training course in 1965. Kwok joined Hong Kong First Division League club Rangers at the age of 18. He played on the right side of midfield for both Rangers and Hong Kong in the 1970s. He retired from playing in 1980 when he was just 30 years old. He took part in three Asian Cup qualifiers (1972, 1976 & 1980) and two World Cup qualifiers (1974 & 1978).

Kwok was awarded the "10 Outstanding Youths of Hong Kong" award in 1977 for his contribution to Hong Kong football after helping Hong Kong reach the final round of World Cup qualifiers, along with Hong Kong movie director Michael Hui.

== 1985 match against China PR ==
Kwok later became the coach of the Hong Kong football team, guiding the team to a decisive victory against China PR by 2–1 at the Workers Stadium in Beijing, China on 19 May 1985, during a 1986 FIFA World Cup qualifying game.

Although the two teams drew 0–0 in their first match in Hong Kong, China PR was considered to be stronger and was favoured to win the group. Due to superior goal difference, China only needed a draw to proceed to the next round. However, a 20-yard freekick by Hong Kong's Cheung Chi Tak (張志德) opened the scoring. China PR replied with Li Hui (李輝)'s goal but another well-taken goal by Ku Kam Fai (顧錦輝) sealed the win for Hong Kong and sent China PR out of the 1986 World Cup.

The loss to Hong Kong delayed China PR's World Cup entry for another 16 years before they finally appeared in 2002 Fifa World Cup. After the game, Chinese fans rioted outside the stadium, while the Hong Kong team received a heroic welcome at the Kai Tak Airport.

The victory was passionately remembered by Hong Kong football fans as "The 5.19 Victory".

== 1986 FIFA World Cup Asia Qualifying Playoffs ==
Hong Kong thus earned the right to play Japan for two home-and-away ties in the second qualifying round. Kwok led the team to Kobe where they lost the first leg 3–0.

The return leg at the Hong Kong Stadium was a complete sell-out but the home side lost 2–1 after missing a penalty and several other chances.

Japan went through 5–1 on aggregate but then went down 3–1 on aggregate to South Korea in the final round and missed the chance to qualify for the finals in Mexico in the following June.

== Other tournaments ==
Kwok has been, for many different tournaments, including the 2006 FIFA World Cup and 2014 FIFA World Cup, a member of The FIFA Technical Study Group.

== Honours ==
Kwok was appointed Member of the Order of the British Empire (MBE) in the 1978 Birthday Honours "for services to Sport in Hong Kong."
