= Kowloon Bay Sports Ground =

Sports ground in Kowloon, Hong Kong

Coordinates: 22.326993°N 114.209696°E

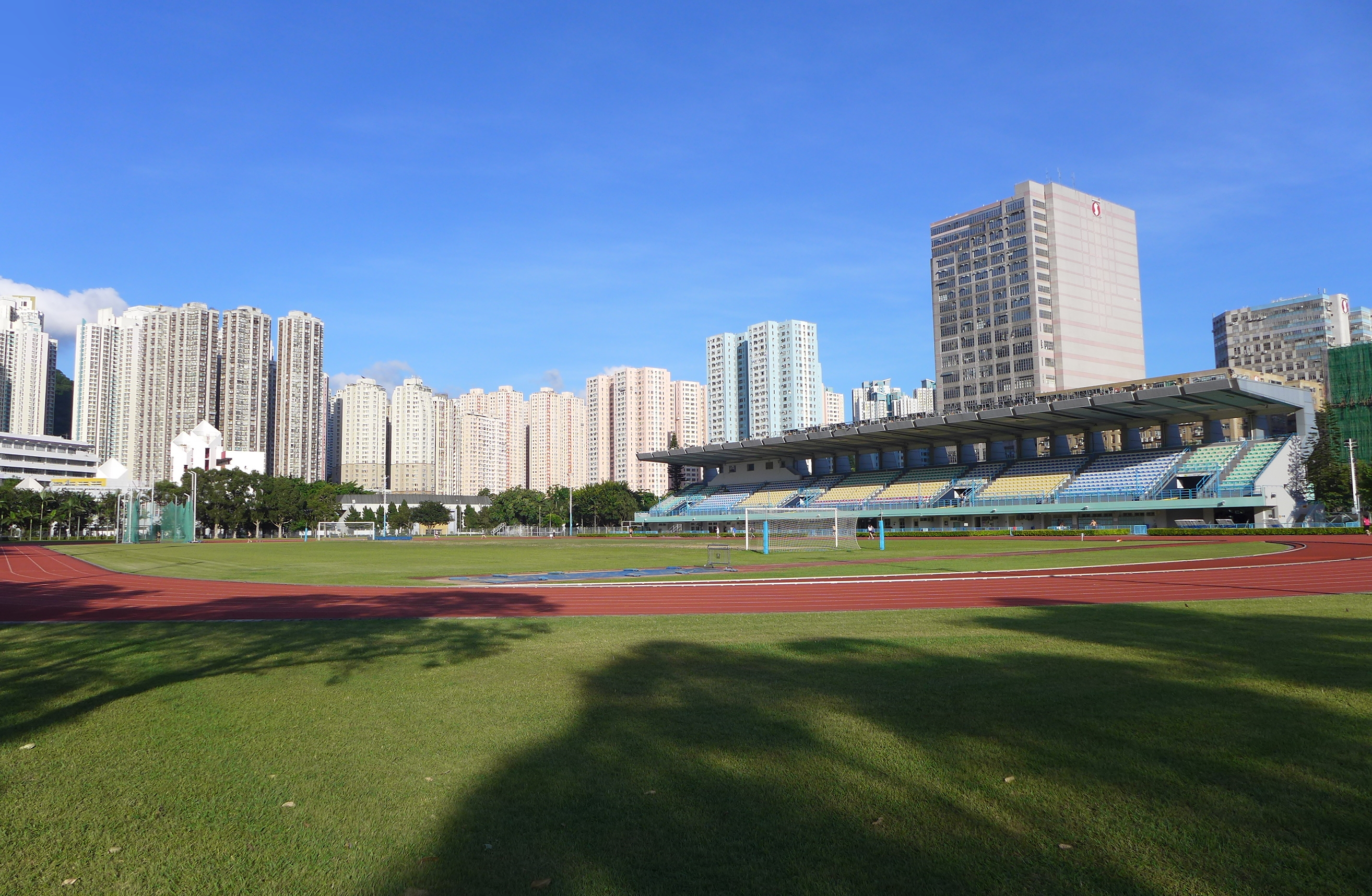
- Kowloon Bay Sports Ground
- Interactive map of Kowloon Bay Sports Ground
- Address: 1 Kai Lok Street, Kowloon Bay, Kowloon, Hong Kong
- Location: Kowloon Bay, Kowloon, Hong Kong
- Owner: Leisure and Cultural Services Department
- Operator: Leisure and Cultural Services Department
- Capacity: 1,450
- Surface: Grass
- Public transit: Kowloon Bay station

Construction
- Opened: 26 September 1987; 38 years ago

Kowloon Bay Sports Ground (Chinese: 九龍灣公園) is a multi-purpose sports ground situated in Kowloon Bay, Kowloon, Hong Kong.

The sports ground comprises an international standard 400-metres running track (8 lanes), an international standard natural turf pitch for ball games with floodlight system, a spectator stand with capacity of 1,450 people, A fee-paying carpark with 30 parking spaces for private car / van-type light goods vehicle and 5 parking spaces for motorcycle, a Fast Food Kiosk as well as electronic timing equipment.

== Gallery ==
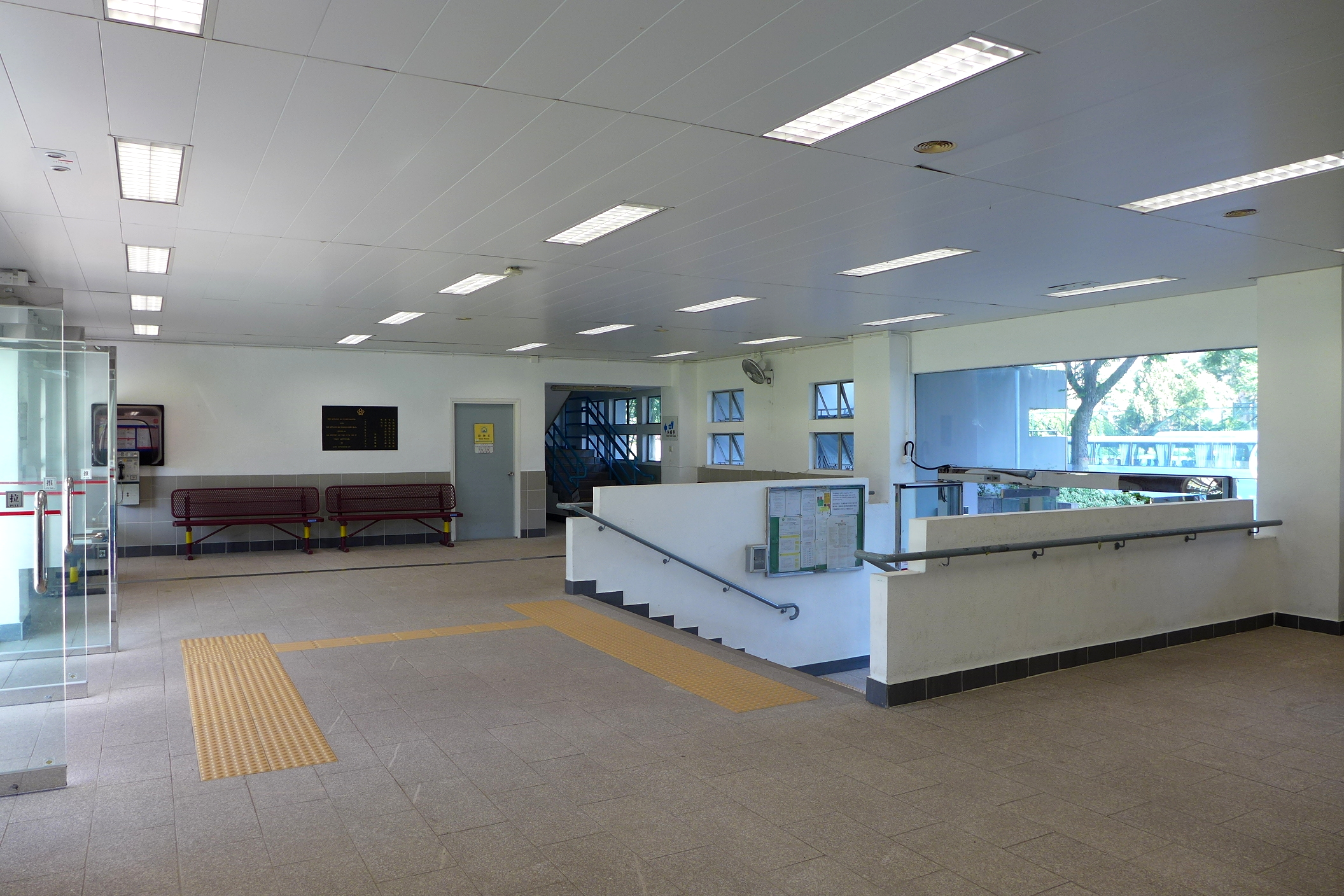
Entrance Lobby

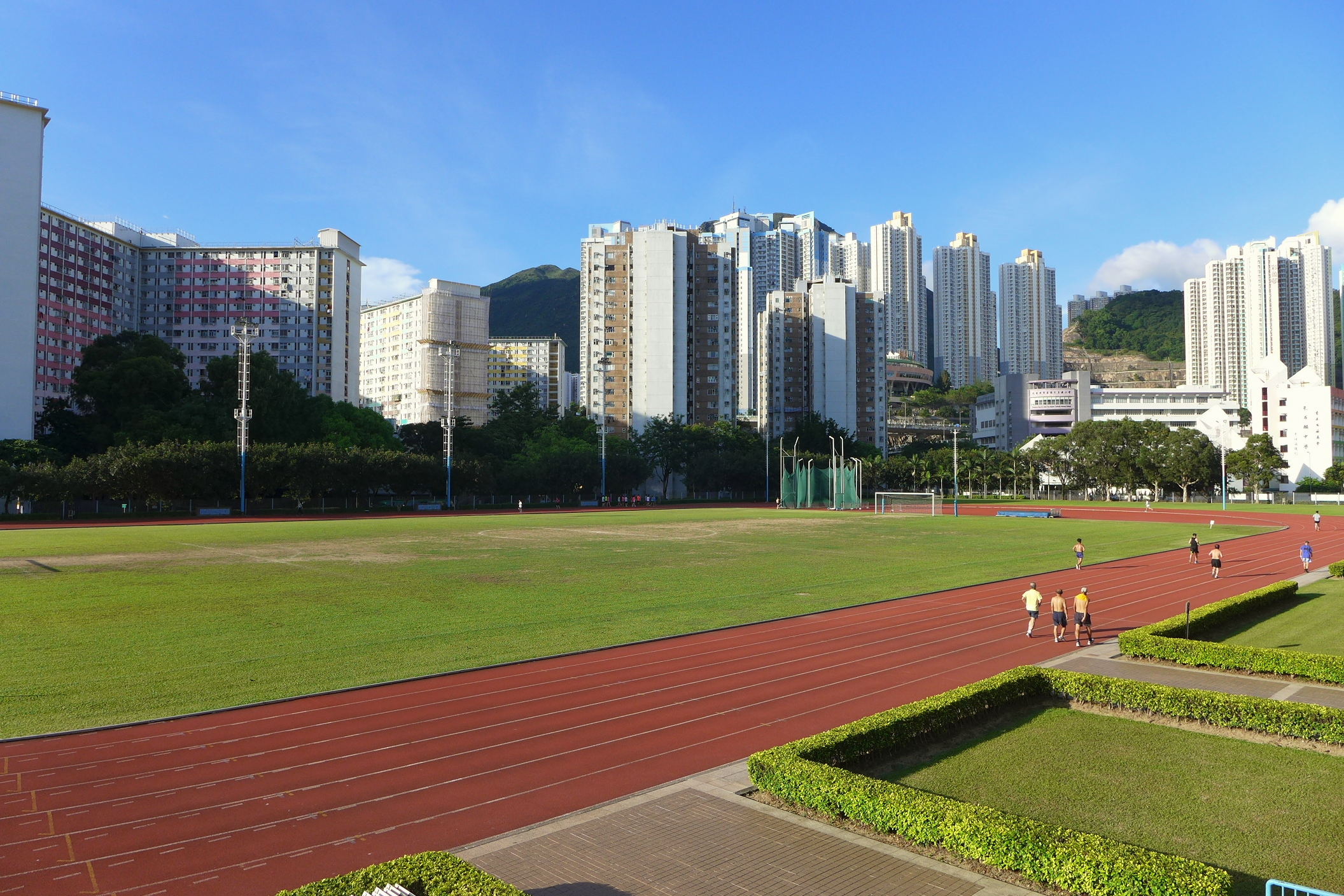
The football field

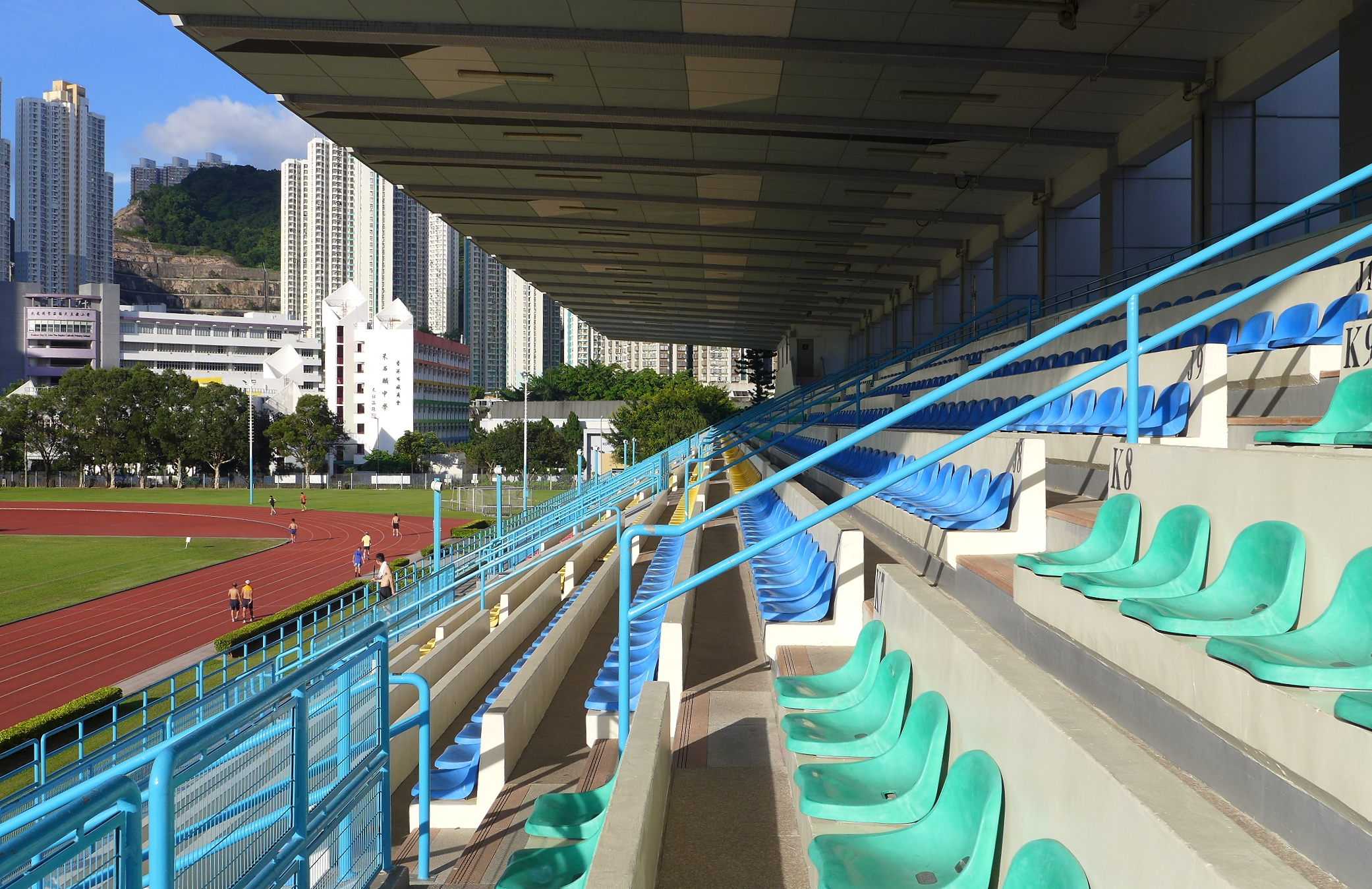
The grandstand

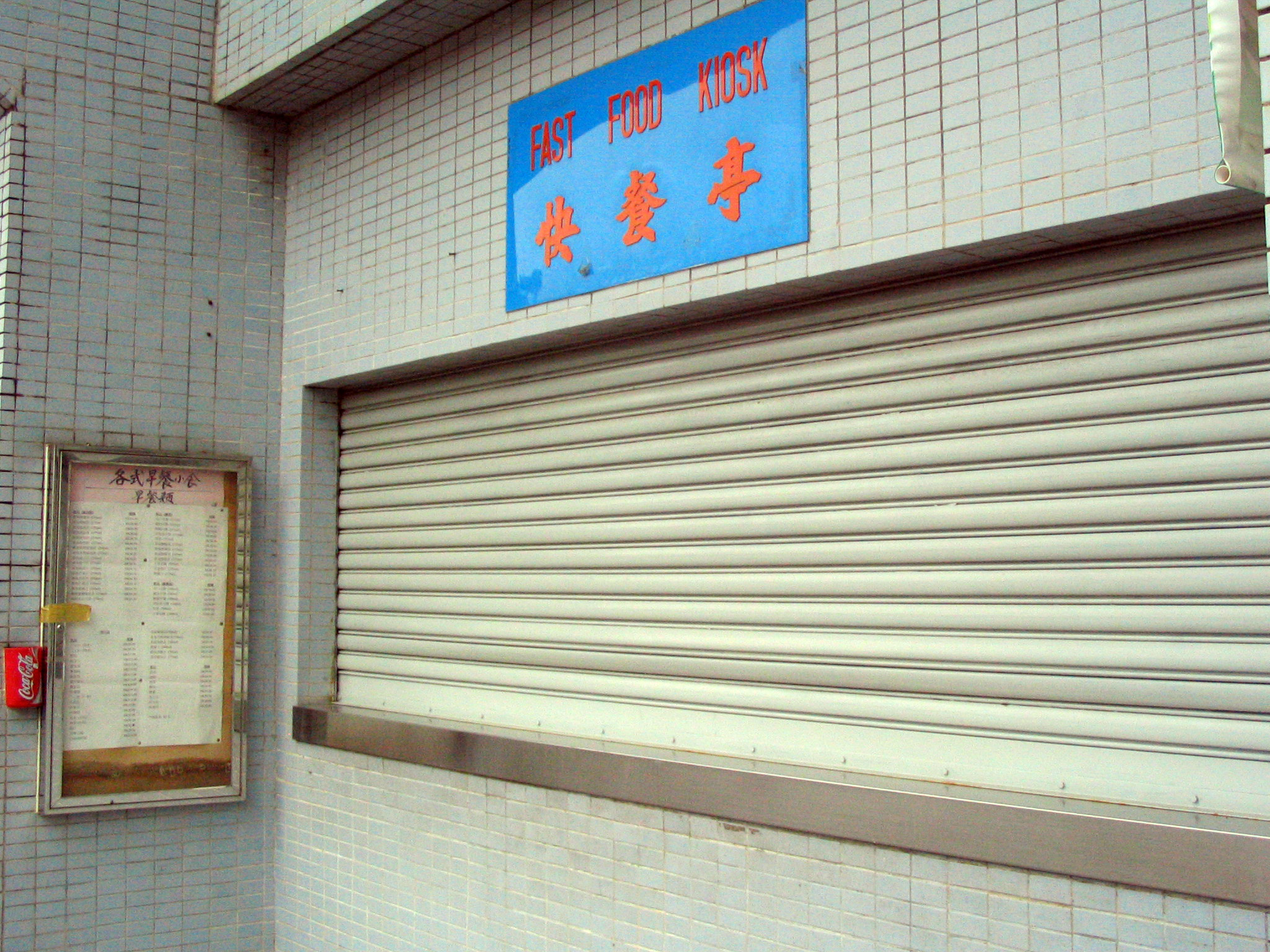
Fast food kiosk (closed)
