= Viceroy Cup =

Football competition in Hong Kong

Hong Kong Viceroy Cup (Chinese: 總督盃) was a football competition in Hong Kong held by British American Tobacco. Started in 1969, it was the first football competition in Hong Kong which allowed commercial sponsorship. Together with First Division League, FA Cup and Senior Shield, they were considered as "Big Four" competitions in Hong Kong football circle. Since July 1999, the Hong Kong government has forbidden the sponsorship of sports events by tobacco firms, although the Chinese name of it suggests "Governor", which was the leader of British Hong Kong colony before the handover of Hong Kong in 1997. The 29th and the last competition was held in 1998.

== Finals ==
=== Results ===
Edition	Season	Winner	Score	Runners-up	Venue	Attendance
1	1969–70	Jardines		Fire Services		
2	1970–71	Eastern		Rangers		
3	1971–72	South China		Rangers		
4	1972–73	Seiko		Eastern		
5	1973–74	Rangers		South China		
6	1974–75	Rangers		South China		
7	1975–76	Happy Valley		Seiko		
8	1976–77	Caroline Hill		Seiko		
9	1977–78	Seiko		Happy Valley		
10	1978–79	Seiko	3–0	Urban Services		
11	1979–80	South China	2–1	Caroline Hill		
12	1980–81	Eastern	2–2	Caroline Hill		
13	1981–82	Bulova		Eastern		
14	1982–83	Bulova	2–1	Eastern		
15	1983–84	Seiko	2–0	Tung Sing		
16	1984–85	Seiko	4–3	South China		
17	1985–86	Seiko	2–0	South China		
18	1986–87	South China	3–0	Tsuen Wan		
19	1987–88	South China	3–2	Sing Tao		
20	1988–89	Lai Sun Double Flower	1–0	Happy Valley		
21	1989–90	Lai Sun	1–0	South China		
22	1990–91	South China	1–0	Lai Sun		
23	1991–92	Ernest Borel	2–1	South China	Government Stadium	
24	1992–93	South China	3–0	Eastern		
25	1993–94	South China	3–1	Instant-Dict		
26	1994–95	Sing Tao	3–0	Instant-Dict	Hong Kong Stadium	
27	1995–96	Instant-Dict	2–1	South China		
28	1996–97	Sing Tao	0–0	Happy Valley	Hong Kong Stadium	5,981
29	1997–98	South China	3–0	Instant-Dict		
