= Seiko SA =

Defunct Hong Kong football club

Seiko
- Full name: Seiko Sports Association
- Founded: 1970
- Dissolved: 1986
Home colours	Away colours

Seiko Sports Association (Chinese: 精工體育會) were one of the most popular and successful football teams in the history of football in Hong Kong. The team withdrew from the Hong Kong First Division League after the 1985–86 season.

== History ==
Seiko was a team sponsored and named by the agents of Seiko Corporation who entered the team into the Hong Kong Third Division in 1970. They finished runners up in the Third Division (B) League with a record of 26 wins, 1 draw and 1 loss from 28 matches and won promotion into the Second Division in the following season. In 1971–72, the team captured the league title immediately after its promotion with a record of 21 wins, 1 draw, 2 losses and were thus promoted to the Hong Kong First Division for the first time. Led by four time Hong Kong Footballer of the Year Wu Kwok Hung, the team then stayed in the top flight for 14 consecutive years until they folded in 1986, following significant declines in crowd attendance.

== Honours ==
Throughout the 14 years in the Hong Kong First Division League, Seiko captured 29 Hong Kong football trophies, which included 9 times League champion, 8 times Hong Kong Senior Shield, 6 times Hong Kong Viceroy Cup and 6 times Hong Kong FA Cup. Its reserve team also captured 2 times reserve league champion.

In 1986, Asian Champions Cup (now AFC Champions League) was re-introduced after its suspension after 1971. Seiko represented Hong Kong for the competition. In the qualifying round, Seiko beat Liaoning FC from China and April 25 Sports Club from North Korea and qualified for the main round. However, the rules set by competition host Saudi Arabia were too harsh and Seiko thereforely withdrew from the competition.

=== Domestic ===
- Hong Kong First Division League
  - Winners (9): 1972–73, 1974–75, 1978–79, 1979–80, 1980–81, 1981–82, 1982–83, 1983–84, 1984–85
  - Runners-up (3): 1973–74, 1975–76, 1976–77
- Hong Kong Senior Shield
  - Winners (8): 1972–73, 1973–74, 1975–76, 1976–77, 1978–79, 1979–80, 1980–81, 1984–85
  - Runners-up (2): 1982–83, 1982–83
- Hong Kong FA Cup
  - Winners (6): 1974–75, 1975–76, 1977–78, 1979–80, 1980–81, 1985–86
  - Runners-up (1): 1978–79
- Hong Kong Viceroy Cup
  - Winners (6): 1972–73, 1977–78, 1978–79, 1983–84, 1984–85, 1985–86
  - Runners-up (2): 1975–76, 1976–77
- HKFA Chairman's Cup
  - Winners (3): 1976–77, 1977-78, 1978-79
- Chairman’s Cup 7-a-Side Tournament
  - Winners (4): 1980–81, 1981–82, 1982–83, 1985–86
- Stanley Wood Shield Tournament
  - Winners (2): 1972–73, 1978–79
- Golden Jubilee Cup
  - Winners (1): 1973–74
- HKFA President’s Cup
  - Winners (1): 1975–76

== Former coaches ==
- Chan Fai Hung ('新馬仔' 陳輝洪) (1970–80, 1981–82, 1983–84)
- George Knobel (盧保) (1981, 1985)
- Bert Jacobs (貝積高) (1982–83)

== League results ==
Season	Position	Matches	Win	Draw	Loss	Goal For	Goal Against	Goal Difference	Points
1972–73	Champion	26	18	4	4	71	35	36	40
1973–74	2nd	26	17	4	5	75	36	39	38
1974–75	Champion	24	15	5	4	54	21	33	35
1975–76	2nd	22	13	4	5	46	22	24	30
1976–77	2nd	22	13	8	1	44	23	21	34
1977–78	4th	22	9	7	6	41	27	14	25
1978–79	Champion	22	19	3	0	60	14	46	41
1979–80	Champion	22	18	3	1	58	15	43	39
1980–81	Champion	20	13	5	2	46	12	34	31
1981–82	Champion	20	15	4	1	45	15	30	34
1982–83	Champion	18	12	4	2	31	13	18	28
1983–84	Champion	16	10	5	1	40	19	21	25
1984–85	Champion	16	12	3	1	37	12	25	27
1985–86	4th	18	7	7	4	35	23	12	21

== Trivia ==
- Seiko was able to capture at least one champion each season.
- Seiko organised many different exhibition matches including against Brazil All-Stars, Club Atlético Boca Juniors from Argentina, AFC Ajax from the Netherlands (an incredible game which Ajax won 5–4), Hamburger SV from Germany, and a 4–3 victory over South Korean Champions Hallelujah FC.
- Seiko won Hong Kong First Division League for 7 consecutive times from 1978–79 to 1984–85.
