= Tung Sing FC =

Tung Sing
- Full name: Tung Sing Athletic Association
- Nickname: The Troops (御林軍)
- Founded: 1959; 67 years ago
- Chairman: Fok Kai Shan
- League: Hong Kong First Division
- 2025–26: First Division, 5th of 14
Home colours	Away colours

Tung Sing Athletic Association (Chinese: 東昇體育會) is a Hong Kong professional football club currently playing in the Hong Kong First Division League. Nicknamed the "Troops" (Chinese: 御林軍), the club was founded by former Hong Kong Football Association president Henry Fok in 1959 and wears orange as their primary colour. Fok's grandson, Fok Kai Shan, is the current president of the club.

== History ==
=== Formation ===
Formerly known as the Yau Wing Football Club, the club was founded by Henry Fok in 1959. Due to the fact that Fok was the HKFA's president at the time, the team because known as the "Troops."

=== 1960s ===
The club won its first trophy in 1961–62 season, capturing the Hong Kong Second Division League title. However, after a poor season, the club were relegated after just one year from the Hong Kong First Division League.

In 1963–64, the club won the Second Division once again and were promoted back to the First Division. Despite finishing second to last place in 1964–65, the Second Division winners Jardine declined promotion, thus allowing Tung Sing to remain the top flight.

Tung Sing reached the final of the Golden Jubilee Cup for the first time in 1970, however they were defeated by Jardine.

=== 1970s ===
The 1970s proved to be the golden age for Tung Sing as the club became an established force in the First Division. The club helped launching the career of Wu Kwok Hung who played for the club between 1968 and 1971 and later became a four-time winner of the Hong Kong Footballer of the Year award.

In 1971–72, Tung Sing finished runners up in the Golden Jubilee Cup and the following season, 1972–73, they achieved their highest league finish to date, placing third in the First Division.

In 1974, Henry Fok shocked Hong Kong football by signing Malaysian keeper Chow Chee Keong on a then unheard of salary of $7,000 HKD a month. Nicknamed "Asia's Steel Door" (Chinese: 亞洲鋼門), he led the team to a Hong Kong FA Cup runners up finish in 1977.

Although the club managed several runners up and second runners up finishes during this decade, championship success eluded them.

=== 1980s ===
Fok relinquished control of the club during the 80's to his eldest son, Timothy Fok. The younger Fok signed a number of Brazilian players such as Jose da Silva who led the team to another runners up finish in the 1984 Viceroy Cup final.

In 1985–86, Goldlion Holdings chairman Tsang Hin-chi assumed control of the club. Due to the HKFA's plan to prohibit foreign players from signing professional contracts by 1986, Tsang decided to move early by releasing the Brazilians. He replaced them with former Chinese national team players Au Wai Ting and Lau Lei Fook in hopes of achieving the same success. Instead, the team finished last place in the First Division that season with a paltry 5 points, and were relegated to the Second Division for the first time in over twenty years.

=== 2010s ===
With the formation of the Hong Kong Premier League in 2014–15, Tung Sing were placed in the Hong Kong Third Division to start the year. After collecting a total of 69 points, the club won the league title and attained their first trophy since 1964.

The following year, the club achieved their second successive promotion by capturing the 2015–16 Hong Kong Second Division title.

In the 2017–18 season, the club finished 14th and were relegated back to the Second Division.

=== 2020s ===
In the 2024–25 season, Tung Sing won the Second Division title, clinching promotion back to the First Division after seven years.

In the 2025–26 season, Tung Sing won the Hong Kong FA Cup Junior Division title.

== Honours ==
=== League ===
- Hong Kong Second Division
  - Champions (5): 1961–62, 1963–64, 2015–16, 2020–21, 2024–25
- Hong Kong Third Division
  - Champions (1): 2014–15

=== Cup Competitions ===
- Hong Kong FA Cup Junior Division
  - Champions (1): 2025–26
