= 1980–81 Tennis Borussia Berlin season =

Tennis Borussia Berlin
1980–81 season
- Manager: Anton Burghardt (until 9 January 1981); Peter Eggert (10 January 1981 – 7 April 1981); Bernd Erdmann (from 8 April 1981)
- Stadium: Mommsenstadion
- 2. Bundesliga (Nord): 17th (relegated)
- DFB-Pokal: First Round
- Top goalscorer: League: Norbert Stolzenburg (14); All: Norbert Stolzenburg (14)
- Highest home attendance: 26,000 (vs. Hertha BSC)
- Lowest home attendance: 500 (vs. SC Preußen Münster; Rot-Weiß Lüdenscheid)
- Average home league attendance: 3,352

The 1980–81 season was the fifth time Tennis Borussia Berlin played in the 2. Fußball-Bundesliga, the second highest tier of the German football league system. After 42 league games, Tennis Borussia finished 17th and were relegated. The club also lost in the first round of the DFB-Pokal; going out 2–0 away to VfL Osnabrück. Norbert Stolzenburg scored 14 of the club's 47 league goals.

== 1980–81 Tennis Borussia Berlin squad ==
No.	Pos.	Nation	Player
—	GK	FRG	Jürgen Bucher
—	GK	FRG	Peter Endrulat
—	DF	FRG	Frank Hanisch
—	DF	YUG	Momir Karadžić
—	DF	FRG	Harry Kleinfeld
—	DF	FRG	Frank-Michael Marczewski
—	DF	FRG	Jürgen Schäfer
—	DF	FRG	Jochem Ziegert (until 31 December 1980)
—	MF	FRG	Peter Fraßmann
—	MF	FRG	Andreas Hinze
—	MF	FRG	Frank Kramer
—	MF	FRG	Edmund Malura

No.	Pos.	Nation	Player
—	MF	FRG	Frank Mischke
—	MF	FRG	Hans-Jürgen Salewski
—	MF	FRG	Wolfgang Schilling
—	MF	FRG	Jürgen Schulz
—	MF	FRG	Friedhelm Schütte
—	FW	FRG	Heikko Glöde
—	FW	FRG	Thomas Grunenberg
—	FW	FRG	Christian Müller
—	FW	FRG	Thorsten Schlumberger
—	FW	FRG	Norbert Stolzenburg
—	FW	FRG	Peter Vogel

== 1980–81 fixtures ==
6 August 1980 2. Bundesliga	Tennis Borussia Berlin	1 – 0	Rot-Weiss Essen	Mommsenstadion, Berlin
19:30	Grunenberg 70'; Schütte (yellow card) Karadžić (yellow card) Schilling (yellow card)	Report	Kaminsky (yellow card)	Attendance: 5,600; Referee: Michael Malbranc (Hamburg)

9 August 1980 2. Bundesliga	SC Herford	2 – 1	Tennis Borussia Berlin	Friedrich-Ludwig-Jahn-Stadion, Herford
15:00	Pallaks 9', 11'	Report	Karadžić 31'; Marczewski (yellow card) Ziegert (yellow card)	Attendance: 3,500; Referee: Hans-Joachim Filipiak (Hanover)

16 August 1980 2. Bundesliga	Tennis Borussia Berlin	0 – 1	SV Werder Bremen	Mommsenstadion, Berlin
15:00	Marczewski (yellow card)	Report	Kostedde 28'	Attendance: 5,200; Referee: Joachim Schoen (Mulmshorn)

20 August 1980 2. Bundesliga	Rot-Weiß Lüdenscheid	0 – 0	Tennis Borussia Berlin	Nattenberg-Stadion, Lüdenscheid
19:30	Schäfer (yellow card)	Report	Grunenberg (yellow card) Schütte (yellow card) Karadžić (yellow card)	Attendance: 1,600; Referee: Friedrich Retzmann (Pinneberg)

23 August 1980 2. Bundesliga	Tennis Borussia Berlin	2 – 2	Hannover 96	Mommsenstadion, Berlin
15:00	Karadžić 39'; Stolzenburg 85'; Grunenberg (yellow card) Karadžić (yellow card)	Report	Schatzschneider 21', 43'; Bebensee (yellow card) Schatzschneider (yellow card)	Attendance: 4,100; Referee: Hans-Gerd Kohnen (Hückelhoven)

27 August 1980 2. Bundesliga	SG Wattenscheid 09	2 – 0	Tennis Borussia Berlin	Lohrheidestadion, Bochum–Wattenscheid
19:30	Reiners 35' (pen.); Hünerlage 52'	Report	Salewski (red card) 36'	Attendance: 2,500; Referee: Jakob Wippker (Aachen)

31 August 1980 DFB-Pokal – R1	VfL Osnabrück	2 – 0 (a.e.t.)	Tennis Borussia Berlin	Stadion an der Bremer Brücke, Osnabrück
	Tune-Hansen 116'; Olaidotter 118'; Hochheimer (yellow card)	Report	Stolzenburg (yellow card) Grunenberg (yellow card) Karadžić (yellow card)	Attendance: 3,500; Referee: Armin Möller (Bochum)

6 September 1980 2. Bundesliga	Tennis Borussia Berlin	1 – 0	VfL Osnabrück	Mommsenstadion, Berlin
15:00	Stolzenburg 85'; Salewski (yellow card)	Report	Lorenz (yellow card)	Attendance: 3,400; Referee: Werner Schütte (Gelsenkirchen)

13 September 1980 2. Bundesliga	Rot-Weiß Oberhausen	1 – 1	Tennis Borussia Berlin	Niederrheinstadion, Oberhausen
15:00	Bartel 87'; Kaczor (yellow card)	Report	Malura 76'; Grunenberg (yellow card); Karadžić (red card) 87'	Attendance: 1,500; Referee: Max Milkert (Dortmund)

20 September 1980 2. Bundesliga	Tennis Borussia Berlin	2 – 2	1. FC Bocholt	Mommsenstadion, Berlin
15:00	Malura 34'; Fraßmann 87'; Glöde (yellow card) Ziegert (yellow card)	Report	Bockenfeld 21'; Majgl 76'; Albrecht (yellow card) Degen (yellow card)	Attendance: 3,900; Referee: Heinz Teichert (Löhne)

26 September 1980 2. Bundesliga	1. SC Göttingen 05	5 – 3	Tennis Borussia Berlin	Jahnstadion, Göttingen
19:00	Snater 3', 28'; Fesser 25'; Brendel 56'; Wolter 71'; Krech (yellow card)	Report	Stolzenburg 10', 34'; Grunenberg 72'; Schilling (yellow card) Stolzenburg (yellow card) Grunenberg (yellow card)	Attendance: 3,100; Referee: Rainer Schnetgöke (Essen)

30 September 1980 2. Bundesliga	VfB Oldenburg	2 – 0	Tennis Borussia Berlin	Stadion Donnerschwee, Oldenburg
19:30	Ohling 48', 49'	Report	Salewski (yellow card) Schulz (yellow card)	Attendance: 3,000; Referee: Peter Mölm (Bremerhaven)

7 October 1980 2. Bundesliga	Tennis Borussia Berlin	2 – 2	SC Viktoria 04 Köln	Mommsenstadion, Berlin
19:30	Malura 10'; Grunenberg 27'; Ziegert (yellow card)	Report	Ochmann 19'; Schmitz 68'	Attendance: 1,500; Referee: Kurt-Dieter Roth

11 October 1980 2. Bundesliga	SC Fortuna Köln	2 – 2	Tennis Borussia Berlin	Südstadion, Cologne
15:00	Guðlaugsson 54'; Schmitz 79'	Report	Stolzenburg 72'; Malura 82'; Schütte (yellow card)	Attendance: 1,000; Referee: Armin Möller (Bochum)

18 October 1980 2. Bundesliga	Tennis Borussia Berlin	1 – 1	Alemannia Aachen	Mommsenstadion, Berlin
15:00	Stolzenburg 30'; Ziegert (yellow card) Salewski (yellow card)	Report	Thomas 12'	Attendance: 3,700; Referee: Gerald Kespohl (Detmold)

25 October 1980 2. Bundesliga	Eintracht Braunschweig	4 – 0	Tennis Borussia Berlin	Eintracht-Stadion, Braunschweig
15:00	Zavišić 15'; Pahl 24', 32'; Keute 74'	Report	Salewski (yellow card)	Attendance: 9,000; Referee: Hans-Jürgen Kopka (Hamburg)

31 October 1980 2. Bundesliga	Tennis Borussia Berlin	1 – 0	OSV Hannover	Mommsenstadion, Berlin
19:00	Stolzenburg 83'; Marczewski (yellow card)	Report		Attendance: 1,300; Referee: Hans-Joachim Osmers (Bremen)

8 November 1980 2. Bundesliga	Holstein Kiel	1 – 1	Tennis Borussia Berlin	Holstein-Stadion, Kiel
15:00	Hamann 87'; Ernemann (yellow card)	Report	Schilling 73'; Schilling (yellow card) Grunenberg (yellow card)	Attendance: 4,500; Referee: Klaus-Peter Zittrich (Isernhagen)

15 November 1980 2. Bundesliga	Tennis Borussia Berlin	1 – 1	SpVgg Erkenschwick	Mommsenstadion, Berlin
15:00	Schilling 82' (pen.); Stolzenburg (yellow card)	Report	Fischer 90'; Fischer (yellow card) Horsthemke (yellow card) Gmeiner (yellow card) Wiese (yellow card)	Attendance: 1,200; Referee: Wilfried Heitmann (Drentwede)

29 November 1980 2. Bundesliga	SG Union Solingen	2 – 1	Tennis Borussia Berlin	Stadion am Hermann-Löns-Weg, Solingen
15:00	Hupe 47'; Lenz 62'	Report	Vogel 73'	Attendance: 4,000; Referee: Rainer Waltert (Paderborn)

6 December 1980 2. Bundesliga	Tennis Borussia Berlin	1 – 1	SC Preußen Münster	Mommsenstadion, Berlin
15:00	Stolzenburg 2'	Report	Eickels 16'; Leifken (yellow card)	Attendance: 500; Referee: Udo Horeis (Hamburg)

19 December 1980 2. Bundesliga	Hertha BSC	2 – 0	Tennis Borussia Berlin	Olympiastadion, Berlin
19:00	Remark 35'; Wesseler 73'; Mohr (yellow card)	Report	Karadžić (yellow card)	Attendance: 44,000; Referee: Wolf-Günter Wiesel (Ottbergen)

10 January 1981 2. Bundesliga	Tennis Borussia Berlin	2 – 1	SC Herford	Mommsenstadion, Berlin
15:00	Glöde 4', 75'; Schütte (yellow card)	Report	Pallaks 47'; Heddinghaus (yellow card)	Attendance: 700; Referee: Wolf-Rüdiger Umbach (Rottdorf)

31 January 1981 2. Bundesliga	Rot-Weiss Essen	2 – 0	Tennis Borussia Berlin	Georg-Melches-Stadion, Essen
15:00	Mill 6', 13'	Report	Marczewski (yellow card)	Attendance: 3,800; Referee: Walter Stark

8 February 1981 2. Bundesliga	SC Preußen Münster	1 – 0	Tennis Borussia Berlin	Preußenstadion, Münster
15:00	Sandhowe 61'; Blankenburg (yellow card) Eickels (yellow card)	Report	Fraßmann (yellow card)	Attendance: 3,200; Referee: Karl-Joseph Prinz (Stolberg)

15 February 1981 2. Bundesliga	Tennis Borussia Berlin	1 – 4	Hertha BSC	Olympiastadion, Berlin
15:00	Schütte 61'	Report	Killmaier 2'; Gruler 67'; Mohr 87'; Schütte 90' (o.g.)	Attendance: 26,000; Referee: Gerd Hennig (Duisburg)

25 February 1981 2. Bundesliga	Tennis Borussia Berlin	1 – 0	Rot-Weiß Lüdenscheid	Mommsenstadion, Berlin
19:30	Fraßmann 3'	Report		Attendance: 500; Referee: Gerd Zimmermann (Wolfsburg)

11 March 1981 2. Bundesliga	SV Werder Bremen	3 – 0	Tennis Borussia Berlin	Weserstadion, Bremen
15:00	Möhlmann 12'; Kostedde 26', 44'	Report		Attendance: 7,000; Referee: Paul Nolte (Alfeld)

14 March 1981 2. Bundesliga	1. FC Bocholt	1 – 1	Tennis Borussia Berlin	Stadion am Hünting, Osnabrück
15:00	Bockenfeld 7'; Majgl (yellow card) Patzke (yellow card)	Report	Fraßmann 16'; Schütte (yellow card) Schlumberger (yellow card)	Attendance: 3,000; Referee: Dieter Stäglich (Bonn)

21 March 1981 2. Bundesliga	Tennis Borussia Berlin	3 – 2	1. SC Göttingen 05	Mommsenstadion, Berlin
15:00	Schlumberger 22', 66'; Marczewski 42'	Report	Schwarck 52'; Schröder 84'; Schröder (yellow card) Schwarck (yellow card)	Attendance: 1,100; Referee: Klaus Ohmsen (Hamburg)

28 March 1981 2. Bundesliga	Tennis Borussia Berlin	0 – 0	VfB Oldenburg	Mommsenstadion, Berlin
15:00		Report	Poesger (yellow card)	Attendance: 1,100; Referee: Hans Wahmann (Gelsenkirchen)

4 April 1981 2. Bundesliga	SC Viktoria 04 Köln	3 – 0	Tennis Borussia Berlin	Südstadion, Cologne
15:00	Brücken 10', 72'; Ochmann 61'	Report		Attendance: 1,200; Referee: Dieter Gathmann (Wattenscheid)

7 April 1981 2. Bundesliga	VfL Osnabrück	2 – 2	Tennis Borussia Berlin	Stadion an der Bremer Brücke, Osnabrück
19:30	Rogoznica 14'; Fagot 78'; Gans (yellow card)	Report	Stolzenburg 28'; Schlumberger 32'; Fraßmann (yellow card) Hinze (yellow card)	Attendance: 6,000; Referee: Wilfred Diekert (Hamburg)

11 April 1981 2. Bundesliga	Tennis Borussia Berlin	1 – 2	SC Fortuna Köln	Mommsenstadion, Berlin
15:00	Stolzenburg 71'	Report	Linßen 19'; Goll 32'; Sauk (yellow card)	Attendance: 1,400; Referee: Jörg Glasneck (Bremen)

16 April 1981 2. Bundesliga	Alemannia Aachen	1 – 3	Tennis Borussia Berlin	Tivoli, Aachen
20:15	Sinnigen 62'; Schipper (yellow card)	Report	Malura 35'; Fraßmann 74'; Stolzenburg 88'; Schulz (yellow card)	Attendance: 4,700; Referee: Hans-Gerd Kohnen (Hückelhoven)

20 April 1981 2. Bundesliga	Tennis Borussia Berlin	1 – 3	Eintracht Braunschweig	Mommsenstadion, Berlin
20:15	Glöde 64'	Report	Worm 35', 67', 86'; Merkhoffer (yellow card)	Attendance: 6,300; Referee: Günter Risse (Hattingen)

25 April 1981 2. Bundesliga	OSV Hannover	0 – 1	Tennis Borussia Berlin	Oststadtstadion, Hannover
15:00	Knopf (yellow card) Rischker (yellow card) Scheiba (yellow card)	Report	Schulz 57'	Attendance: 200; Referee: Heinz-Dieter Welling (Hamburg)

30 April 1981 2. Bundesliga	Tennis Borussia Berlin	3 – 1	Holstein Kiel	Mommsenstadion, Berlin
20:15	Schlumberger 14'; Schilling 46', 72'	Report	Möller 90'; Rausch (yellow card) Stickel (yellow card)	Attendance: 600; Referee: Hans-Joachim Filipiak (Hanover)

5 May 1981 2. Bundesliga	SpVgg Erkenschwick	1 – 1	Tennis Borussia Berlin	Stimbergstadion, Oer-Erkenschwick
19:30	Melis 22'; Kerkemeier (yellow card)	Report	Schilling 9'	Attendance: 800; Referee: Karl-Josef Assenmacher (Fischenich)

9 May 1981 2. Bundesliga	Tennis Borussia Berlin	1 – 2	SG Union Solingen	Mommsenstadion, Berlin
15:00	Malura 82'	Report	Lenz 49'; Seegler 55'	Attendance: 1,000; Referee: Friedrich Retzmann (Pinneberg)

16 May 1981 2. Bundesliga	Hannover 96	5 – 3	Tennis Borussia Berlin	Niedersachsenstadion, Hanover
15:00	Hayduk 8', 88'; Kleppinger 64' (pen.); Sagna 65'; Bebensee 75'	Report	Schilling 40'; Stolzenburg 81', 88'; Schilling (yellow card)	Attendance: 2,800; Referee: Gerald Kespohl (Detmold)

23 May 1981 2. Bundesliga	Tennis Borussia Berlin	2 – 3	Rot-Weiß Oberhausen	Mommsenstadion, Berlin
15:00	Schäfer 1'; Stolzenburg 43'	Report	Mannebach 30', 53'; Kaczor 85'; Mannebach (yellow card)	Attendance: 600; Referee: Volker Roth (Salzgitter)

30 May 1981 2. Bundesliga	Tennis Borussia Berlin	0 – 1	SG Wattenscheid 09	Mommsenstadion, Berlin
15:00	Hanisch (yellow card) Marczewski (yellow card)	Report	Drews 12'; Steiner (yellow card)	Attendance: 700; Referee: Karl-Joseph Prinz (Stolberg)

== Player statistics ==
Pos	Player	Apps	Goals	Apps	Goals	Apps	Goals
Pos	Player	2. Bundesliga		DFB-Pokal		Total	
GK	(West Germany) Jürgen Bucher	25	0	1	0	26	0
GK	(West Germany) Peter Endrulat	18	0	0	0	18	0
MF	(West Germany) Peter Fraßmann	41	4	1	0	42	4
FW	(West Germany) Heikko Glöde	21	3	0	0	21	3
FW	(West Germany) Thomas Grunenberg	21	3	1	0	22	3
DF	(West Germany) Frank Hanisch	16	0	1	0	17	0
MF	(West Germany) Andreas Hinze	11	0	1	0	12	0
DF	(Socialist Federal Republic of Yugoslavia) Momir Karadžić	17	2	1	0	18	0
DF	(West Germany) Harry Kleinfeld	4	0	0	0	4	0
MF	(West Germany) Frank Kramer	5	0	0	0	5	0
MF	(West Germany) Edmund Malura	38	6	1	0	39	6
DF	(West Germany) Frank-Michael Marczewski	35	1	1	0	36	1
MF	(West Germany) Frank Mischke	15	0	0	0	15	0
FW	(West Germany) Christian Müller	5	0	0	0	5	0
MF	(West Germany) Hans-Jürgen Salewski	33	0	0	0	33	0
DF	(West Germany) Jürgen Schäfer	3	1	0	0	3	1
MF	(West Germany) Wolfgang Schilling	38	6	1	0	39	6
FW	(West Germany) Thorsten Schlumberger	19	4	0	0	19	4
MF	(West Germany) Jürgen Schulz	34	1	0	0	34	1
MF	(West Germany) Friedhelm Schütte	41	1	1	0	42	1
FW	(West Germany) Norbert Stolzenburg	36	14	1	0	37	14
FW	(West Germany) Peter Vogel	15	1	1	0	16	1
DF	(West Germany) Jochem Ziegert	19	0	1	0	20	0

== Final league position – 17th ==
1980–81 2. Fußball-Bundesliga Nord: extract from the final league table
Pos	Team	Pld	W	D	L	GF	GA	GD	Points
1	SV Werder Bremen (C)	42	30	8	4	97	33	+64	68:16
16	SC Herford (R)	42	11	10	21	48	65	–17	32:52
17	Tennis Borussia Berlin (R)	42	9	14	19	47	71	–24	32:52
18	1. SC Göttingen 05 (R)	42	9	14	19	67	98	–31	32:52
22	OSV Hannover (R)	42	7	5	30	41	108	–67	19:65
