= 1978–79 Tennis Borussia Berlin season =

Tennis Borussia Berlin
1978–79 season
- Manager: Reinhard Roder
- Stadium: Mommsenstadion
- 2. Bundesliga (Nord): 11th
- DFB-Pokal: Third Round
- Top goalscorer: League: Allan Hansen + Norbert Stolzenburg (both 11); All: Allan Hansen + Norbert Stolzenburg (both 11)
- Highest home attendance: 50,000 (vs. SC Wacker 04 Berlin)
- Lowest home attendance: 700 (vs. SC Fortuna Köln)
- Average home league attendance: 4,263

The 1978–79 season was the third time Tennis Borussia Berlin played in the 2. Bundesliga, the second highest tier of the German football league system. After 38 league games, Tennis Borussia finished 11th in the division, following a tenth-placed finish the previous year. The club reached the third round of the DFB-Pokal; losing 2–0 at home to 1. FC Nürnberg. Allan Hansen and Norbert Stolzenburg each scored 11 league goals during the season.

== 1978–79 Tennis Borussia Berlin squad ==
No.	Pos.	Nation	Player
—	GK	FRG	Peter Endrulat
—	GK	FRG	Gerhard Welz
—	DF	FRG	Klaus-Peter Hanisch
—	DF	FRG	Dieter Hochheimer
—	DF	FRG	Frank-Michael Marczewski
—	DF	FRG	Reinhard Schmitz
—	DF	FRG	Hans Sprenger
—	DF	FRG	Jochem Ziegert

No.	Pos.	Nation	Player
—	MF	FRG	Fred Arbinger
—	MF	FRG	Wolfgang Schilling
—	MF	FRG	Norbert Schmitz
—	MF	FRG	Jürgen Schulz
—	FW	DEN	Allan Hansen
—	FW	FRG	Manfred Krüger
—	FW	FRG	Norbert Stolzenburg
—	FW	FRG	Peter Vogel

== 1978–79 fixtures ==
30 July 1978 2. Bundesliga	Tennis Borussia Berlin	1–1	Rot-Weiss Essen	Mommsenstadion, Berlin
15:00	Hansen 12'; Hansen (yellow card) N. Schmitz (yellow card)	Report	Ehmke 69' (pen.); Herget (yellow card) Mill (yellow card)	Attendance: 5,000; Referee: Walter Niemann (Hamburg)

5 August 1978 DFB-Pokal – R1	Tennis Borussia Berlin	2–0 (a.e.t.)	SG Union Solingen	Mommsenstadion, Berlin
	Hochheimer 100'; N. Schmitz 115'; Schulz (yellow card)	Report	Jovanovic (yellow card) Hupe (yellow card)	Attendance: 2,900; Referee: Walter Marchefka (Peine)

9 August 1978 2. Bundesliga	Bayer 04 Leverkusen	5–2	Tennis Borussia Berlin	Ulrich-Haberland-Stadion, Leverkusen
19:30	Bruckmann 12', 39'; Hörster 51'; Brücken 74', 88'; Brücken (yellow card)	Report	Hansen 70', 83'; Ziegert (yellow card)	Attendance: 7,000; Referee: Dieter Gathmann (Wattenscheid)

13 August 1978 2. Bundesliga	Tennis Borussia Berlin	2–0	Rot-Weiß Lüdenscheid	Mommsenstadion, Berlin
15:00	Schulz 28'; Marczewski 57'; Hochheimer (yellow card)	Report	Holtkamp (yellow card)	Attendance: 2,000; Referee: Hans-Joachim Filipiak (Hanover)

20 August 1978 2. Bundesliga	SV Arminia Hannover	1–1	Tennis Borussia Berlin	Stadion am Bischofsholer Damm, Hanover
15:00	Mrosko 53'; Brandt (yellow card)	Report	Marczewski 75'	Attendance: 3,000; Referee: Udo Horeis (Hamburg)

27 August 1978 2. Bundesliga	Tennis Borussia Berlin	3–3	Hannover 96	Mommsenstadion, Berlin
15:00	Schilling 26'; Hansen 83'; R. Schmitz 88'; N. Schmitz (yellow card)	Report	Schatzschneider 54', 81'; Anders 70'; Kulik (yellow card) Deterding (yellow card)	Attendance: 3,200; Referee: Friedrich Retzmann (Pinneberg)

3 September 1978 2. Bundesliga	Holstein Kiel	0–0	Tennis Borussia Berlin	Holstein-Stadion, Kiel
15:00	Haltenhof (yellow card)	Report	Hansen (yellow card) Marczewski (yellow card)	Attendance: 7,500; Referee: Michael Malbranc (Hamburg)

10 September 1978 2. Bundesliga	Tennis Borussia Berlin	0–2	SC Preußen Münster	Mommsenstadion, Berlin
15:00		Report	Petkovic 42', 73'	Attendance: 2,500; Referee: Wilfried Heitmann (Drentwede)

17 September 1978 2. Bundesliga	VfL Osnabrück	2–0	Tennis Borussia Berlin	Stadion an der Bremer Brücke, Osnabrück
15:00	Wagner 35'; Schock 88'	Report		Attendance: 6,500; Referee: Klaus Ohmsen (Hamburg)

23 September 1978 DFB-Pokal – R2	Tennis Borussia Berlin	3–3 (a.e.t.)	VfR Bürstadt	Mommsenstadion, Berlin
	R. Schmitz 3'; Schulz 26'; Ziegert 119'; Marczewski (yellow card) Schilling (yellow card) R. Schmitz (yellow card)	Report	Grimm 7'; Jordan 72'; Stetter 115'	Attendance: 1,200; Referee: Hans-Jürgen Kopka (Hamburg)

1 October 1978 2. Bundesliga	Tennis Borussia Berlin	2–1	Alemannia Aachen	Mommsenstadion, Berlin
15:00	Hansen 14'; Stolzenburg 42'; Schilling (yellow card) Ziegert (yellow card)	Report	Kehr 53'; Montañés (yellow card) Balke (yellow card)	Attendance: 1,500; Referee: Gerd Hennig (Duisburg)

3 October 1978 DFB-Pokal – R2; Replay	VfR Bürstadt	0–0 (a.e.t.) (3–4 p)	Tennis Borussia Berlin	Waldstadion, Bürstadt
	Strack (yellow card) Dörenberg (yellow card) Schauß (yellow card)	Report	Ziegert (yellow card) Hochheimer (yellow card)	Attendance: 3,000; Referee: Jürgen Schumann (Neuwied)
	Penalties
	Nathmann (penalty scored); Zahnleiter (penalty scored); Lange (penalty scored)		(penalty scored) Marczewski; (penalty scored) Stolzenburg; (penalty scored) Schilling; (penalty scored) Hansen

8 October 1978 2. Bundesliga	Wuppertaler SV	0–0	Tennis Borussia Berlin	Stadion am Zoo, Wuppertal
15:00		Report		Attendance: 2,300; Referee: Joachim Schoen (Mulmshorn)

15 October 1978 2. Bundesliga	Tennis Borussia Berlin	1–4	FC Bayer 05 Uerdingen	Mommsenstadion, Berlin
15:00	Stolzenburg 31'; Stolzenburg (yellow card)	Report	Mattsson 54'; Hoffmann 62'; Finnern 72'; Lüttges 78'	Attendance: 2,900; Referee: Detlef Eggers (Hamburg)

22 October 1978 2. Bundesliga	FC St. Pauli	0–2	Tennis Borussia Berlin	Millerntor-Stadion, Hamburg
15:00	Frosch (yellow card)	Report	Stolzenburg 83'; Sprenger 89'; Ziegert (yellow card) Schilling (yellow card)	Attendance: 2,500; Referee: Volker Roth (Salzgitter)

29 October 1978 2. Bundesliga	Tennis Borussia Berlin	1–2	SC Wacker 04 Berlin	Olympiastadion, Berlin
15:00	Schilling 5'	Report	Müller 9'; Liedtke 84'; Lindner (yellow card)	Attendance: 50,000; Referee: Günther Risse (Hattingen)

5 November 1978 2. Bundesliga	SC Viktoria 04 Köln	2–0	Tennis Borussia Berlin	Sportpark Höhenberg, Cologne
15:00	Bredenfeld 61'; Czizewski 90'	Report	Hochheimer (yellow card)	Attendance: 4,000; Referee: Armin Möller (Bochum)

12 November 1978 2. Bundesliga	Tennis Borussia Berlin	2–1	SG Wattenscheid 09	Mommsenstadion, Berlin
15:00	Stolzenburg 32'; Arbinger 72'; Schilling (yellow card) Hochheimer (yellow card)	Report	Kunkel 24'; Tinnefeld (yellow card) Jakobs (yellow card)	Attendance: 1,000; Referee: Willi Kornrumpf (Südwinsen)

19 November 1978 2. Bundesliga	DSC Wanne-Eickel	2–2	Tennis Borussia Berlin	Stadion im Sportpark Wanne-Süd, Herne
15:00	Mauthe 11'; Leske 17'	Report	Hansen 53'; Ziegert 81'; Hansen (yellow card)	Attendance: 3,000; Referee: Hans-Joachim Osmers (Bremen)

26 November 1978 2. Bundesliga	SC Westfalia Herne	1–2	Tennis Borussia Berlin	Stadion am Schloss Strünkede, Herne
15:00	Fritsche 23'	Report	Arbinger 20'; Hansen 50'; Hansen (yellow card) N. Schmitz (yellow card)	Attendance: 2,000; Referee: Wolfgang Richter (Kürten)

29 November 1978 DFB-Pokal – R3	Tennis Borussia Berlin	0–2	1. FC Nürnberg	Mommsenstadion, Berlin
		Report	Lieberwirth 16'; Täuber 76'	Attendance: 3,100; Referee: Hans-Heinrich Barnick (Schenefeld)

10 December 1978 2. Bundesliga	Tennis Borussia Berlin	3–3	SG Union Solingen	Mommsenstadion, Berlin
15:00	Schulz 3'; Ziegert 55'; N. Schmitz 87'; Sprenger (yellow card)	Report	Hupe 40' de Vries 89'; Krüger 90'; Heise (yellow card) Elm (yellow card)	Attendance: 1,100; Referee: Wolf-Rüdiger Umbach (Rottdorf)

17 December 1978 2. Bundesliga	SC Fortuna Köln	4–0	Tennis Borussia Berlin	Müngersdorfer Stadion, Cologne
15:00	Mödrath 20', 76'; Stegmayer 46'; Kroth 64'	Report		Attendance: 300; Referee: Wolf-Günter Wiesel (Ottbergen)

21 January 1979 2. Bundesliga	Tennis Borussia Berlin	0–2	Bayer 04 Leverkusen	Mommsenstadion, Berlin
15:00		Report	Gelsdorf 5'; Scheinert 37'	Attendance: 1,300; Referee: Udo Horeis (Hamburg)

18 March 1979 2. Bundesliga	Tennis Borussia Berlin	3–0	VfL Osnabrück	Mommsenstadion, Berlin
15:00	Hansen 40', 82'; Stolzenburg 57'	Report	Wiesler (yellow card) Nordmann (yellow card)	Attendance: 800; Referee: Werner Schütte (Gelsenkirchen)

27 March 1979 2. Bundesliga	SC Preußen Münster	2–2	Tennis Borussia Berlin	Preußenstadion, Münster
19:30	Fraßmann 10'; Fuchs 71'; Schütte (yellow card)	Report	N. Schmitz 34'; Schilling 52'; Welz (yellow card) Stolzenburg (yellow card)	Attendance: 5,200; Referee: Dieter Gathmann (Wattenscheid)

30 March 1979 2. Bundesliga	Tennis Borussia Berlin	1–0	Wuppertaler SV	Mommsenstadion, Berlin
19:00	Schilling 71'; Hanisch (yellow card) Arbinger (yellow card)	Report	Pecl (yellow card) Redder (yellow card)	Attendance: 900; Referee: Wolfgang Engelmann (Hamburg)

2 April 1979 2. Bundesliga	Tennis Borussia Berlin	9–0	Holstein Kiel	Mommsenstadion, Berlin
20:15	Marczewski 5'; Stolzenburg 10', 23', 65'; N. Schmitz 25'; Schilling 39', 72'; Arbinger 49'; Hansen 75'	Report		Attendance: 1,400; Referee: Tiene

6 April 1979 2. Bundesliga	FC Bayer 05 Uerdingen	2–0	Tennis Borussia Berlin	Grotenburg-Stadion, Krefeld
19:00	Lüttges 5', 52' (pen.)	Report	R. Schmitz (yellow card)	Attendance: 4,300; Referee: Armin Möller (Bochum)

12 April 1979 2. Bundesliga	Rot-Weiß Lüdenscheid	1–0	Tennis Borussia Berlin	Nattenberg-Stadion, Lüdenscheid
20:15	Goscianiak 74'; Bergter (yellow card)	Report	N. Schmitz (yellow card)	Attendance: 900; Referee: Friedrich Retzmann (Pinneberg)

16 April 1979 2. Bundesliga	Tennis Borussia Berlin	0–0	FC St. Pauli	Mommsenstadion, Berlin
20:15		Report	Demuth (yellow card)	Attendance: 2,500; Referee: Joachim Schoen (Mulmshorn)

20 April 1979 2. Bundesliga	SC Wacker 04 Berlin	2–3	Tennis Borussia Berlin	Wackerplatz, Berlin
19:00	Liedtke 18' (pen.), 56'; Müller (yellow card)	Report	Schilling 50', 60'; Hochheimer 85'; Marczewski (yellow card)	Attendance: 2,300; Referee: Jan Redelfs

1 May 1979 2. Bundesliga	Rot-Weiss Essen	0–2	Tennis Borussia Berlin	Georg-Melches-Stadion, Essen
19:30		Report	Ziegert 12'; Vogel 82'; Vogel (yellow card) Marczewski (yellow card)	Attendance: 1,700; Referee: Walter Horstmann (Hildesheim)

4 May 1979 2. Bundesliga	Tennis Borussia Berlin	4–0	SC Viktoria 04 Köln	Mommsenstadion, Berlin
19:00	Stolzenburg 6', 11'; Hochheimer 15'; Vogel 63'	Report	Czizewski (yellow card)	Attendance: 1,100; Referee: Dieter Gabriel (Springe)

9 May 1979 2. Bundesliga	SG Wattenscheid 09	1–0	Tennis Borussia Berlin	Lohrheidestadion, Bochum–Wattenscheid
19:30	Zimmer 39'	Report	Ziegert (yellow card) R. Schmitz (yellow card)	Attendance: 700; Referee: Wolfgang Richter (Kürten)

12 May 1979 2. Bundesliga	Tennis Borussia Berlin	1–1	DSC Wanne-Eickel	Mommsenstadion, Berlin
15:00	Hochheimer 40'; Vogel (yellow card)	Report	Oehler 28'; Lücke (yellow card) Keese (yellow card)	Attendance: 1,200; Referee: Hans-Heinrich Barnick (Schenefeld)

18 May 1979 2. Bundesliga	Tennis Borussia Berlin	2–1	SC Westfalia Herne	Mommsenstadion, Berlin
19:00	R. Schmitz 8'; Stolzenburg 24'; Marczewski (yellow card)	Report	Brexendorf 1'	Attendance: 1,100; Referee: Gerd Lins (Elmschenhagen)

22 May 1979 2. Bundesliga	Hannover 96	3–0	Tennis Borussia Berlin	Niedersachsenstadion, Hanover
19:30	Rieländer 8', 56'; Schatzschneider 68'; Winskowsky (yellow card)	Report	Marczewski (yellow card)	Attendance: 2,400; Referee: Günther Risse (Hattingen)

27 May 1979 2. Bundesliga	Tennis Borussia Berlin	1–1	SV Arminia Hannover	Mommsenstadion, Berlin
15:00	N. Schmitz 43'; R. Schmitz (yellow card)	Report	Genschick 74'; Fleer (yellow card) Mrosko (yellow card)	Attendance: 800; Referee: Kurt-Dieter Roth

29 May 1979 2. Bundesliga	Alemannia Aachen	1–1	Tennis Borussia Berlin	Tivoli, Aachen
19:30	Stradt 55'	Report	Vogel 54'; R. Schmitz (yellow card)	Attendance: 2,200; Referee: Heinz-Theo Heymann (Krefeld)

2 June 1979 2. Bundesliga	SG Union Solingen	4–0	Tennis Borussia Berlin	Stadion am Hermann-Löns-Weg, Solingen
15:00	Heise 13', 44'; Gorny 24' de Vries 57'	Report		Attendance: 1,300; Referee: Manfred Wichmann (Gelsenkirchen)

9 June 1979 2. Bundesliga	Tennis Borussia Berlin	5–6	SC Fortuna Köln	Mommsenstadion, Berlin
15:00	Vogel 2', 45'; Hansen 17' (pen.); Ziegert 37', 40'; Hochheimer (yellow card)	Report	Mödrath 24', 30', 38'; Schuster 53'; Stegmayer 55', 83'; Finkler (yellow card)	Attendance: 700; Referee: Michael Malbranc (Hamburg)

== Player statistics ==
Pos	Player	Apps	Goals	Apps	Goals	Apps	Goals
Pos	Player	1978–79 2. Bundesliga		DFB-Pokal		Total	
MF	(West Germany) Fred Arbinger	36	3	4	0	40	3
GK	(West Germany) Peter Endrulat	4	0	0	0	4	0
DF	(West Germany) Klaus-Peter Hanisch	27	0	4	0	31	0
FW	(Denmark) Allan Hansen	34	11	4	0	38	11
DF	(West Germany) Dieter Hochheimer	38	3	4	1	42	4
FW	(West Germany) Manfred Krüger	5	0	0	0	5	0
DF	(West Germany) Frank-Michael Marczewski	38	3	4	0	42	3
MF	(West Germany) Wolfgang Schilling	32	8	4	0	36	8
MF	(West Germany) Norbert Schmitz	27	4	2	1	29	5
DF	(West Germany) Reinhard Schmitz	32	2	2	1	34	3
MF	(West Germany) Jürgen Schulz	34	2	4	1	38	3
DF	(West Germany) Hans Sprenger	23	1	2	0	25	1
FW	(West Germany) Norbert Stolzenburg	37	11	4	0	41	11
FW	(West Germany) Peter Vogel	19	5	2	0	21	5
GK	(West Germany) Gerhard Welz	34	0	4	0	38	0
DF	(West Germany) Jochem Ziegert	33	5	4	1	37	6

== Final league position – 11th ==
1978–79 2. Bundesliga Nord: extract from the final league table
Pos	Team	Pld	W	D	L	GF	GA	GD	Points
1	Bayer 04 Leverkusen (C)	38	24	11	3	87	34	+53	59:17
10	SG Wattenscheid 09	38	10	16	12	49	47	+2	36:40
11	Tennis Borussia Berlin	38	12	12	14	58	61	–3	36:40
12	SV Arminia Hannover	38	13	10	15	56	65	−9	36:40
20	SC Wacker 04 Berlin (R)	38	8	5	25	33	87	−54	21:55
