= 1979–80 Tennis Borussia Berlin season =

Tennis Borussia Berlin
1979–80 season
- Manager: Reinhard Roder (until 6 February 1980); Peter Eggert (7 February 1980 – 15 April 1980); Paul Böhm (from 16 April 1980)
- Stadium: Mommsenstadion
- 2. Bundesliga (Nord): 13th
- DFB-Pokal: First round
- Top goalscorer: League: Norbert Stolzenburg (24); All: Norbert Stolzenburg (24)
- Highest home attendance: 4,500 (vs. SV Arminia Hannover)
- Lowest home attendance: 700 (vs. Holstein Kiel)
- Average home league attendance: 1,479

The 1979–80 season was the fourth time Tennis Borussia Berlin played in the 2. Fußball-Bundesliga, the second highest tier of the German football league system. After 38 league games, Tennis Borussia finished 13th in the division, following an eleventh-placed finish the previous year. The club lost in the first round of the DFB-Pokal; going out 1–0 away to SC Viktoria 04 Köln. Norbert Stolzenburg scored 24 of the club's 57 league goals.

== 1979–80 Tennis Borussia Berlin squad ==
No.	Pos.	Nation	Player
—	GK	FRG	Peter Endrulat
—	GK	FRG	Thomas Vogt
—	DF	FRG	Frank Hanisch
—	DF	FRG	Klaus-Peter Hanisch
—	DF	FRG	Dieter Hochheimer (until 31 December 1979)
—	DF	YUG	Momir Karadžić
—	DF	FRG	Frank-Michael Marczewski
—	DF	FRG	Jochem Ziegert
—	MF	FRG	Fred Arbinger
—	MF	FRG	Andreas Hinze
—	MF	FRG	Nico Lazaridis
—	MF	FRG	Ralf Nettelbeck

No.	Pos.	Nation	Player
—	MF	FRG	Hans-Jürgen Salewski
—	MF	FRG	Jürgen Schäfer
—	MF	FRG	Wolfgang Schilling
—	MF	FRG	Peter Schmidt
—	MF	FRG	Norbert Schmitz
—	MF	FRG	Peter Schultz
—	MF	FRG	Jürgen Schulz
—	FW	FRG	Thomas Grunenberg
—	FW	DEN	Allan Hansen
—	FW	FRG	Manfred Krüger
—	FW	FRG	Norbert Stolzenburg
—	FW	FRG	Peter Vogel

== 1979–80 fixtures ==
28 July 1979 2. Bundesliga	Holstein Kiel	2 – 3	Tennis Borussia Berlin	Holstein-Stadion, Kiel
15:00	Jochimiak 35'; Ernemann 40'	Report	Marczewski 62'; Schmitz 83'; Schilling 84'; Marczewski (yellow card) Ziegert (yellow card)	Attendance: 7,500; Referee: Michael Malbranc (Hamburg)

3 August 1979 2. Bundesliga	Tennis Borussia Berlin	3 – 2	SV Arminia Hannover	Mommsenstadion, Berlin
19:00	Grunenberg 5', 23'; Arbinger 39'; Schulz (yellow card)	Report	Bebensee 11'; Bentrup 58'	Attendance: 4,500; Referee: Manfred Uhlig (Dortmund)

9 August 1979 2. Bundesliga	SG Union Solingen	3 – 1	Tennis Borussia Berlin	Stadion am Hermann-Löns-Weg, Solingen
20:15	Diekmann 5', 55'; Hupe 67'	Report	Karadžić 15'; Krüger (yellow card)	Attendance: 5,000; Referee: Günther Risse (Hattingen)

18 August 1979 2. Bundesliga	Tennis Borussia Berlin	2 – 3	DSC Wanne-Eickel	Mommsenstadion, Berlin
15:00	Stolzenburg 24'; Hochheimer 84'	Report	Mauthe 23', 62'; Leske 65'; Lücke (yellow card)	Attendance: 2,300; Referee: Paul Nolte (Alfeld)

21 August 1979 2. Bundesliga	Arminia Bielefeld	4 – 1	Tennis Borussia Berlin	Stadion Alm, Bielefeld
19:30	Graul 9'; Köstner 62'; Sackewitz 66'; Schock 71'	Report	Vogel 74'; Schulz (yellow card) Karadžić (yellow card)	Attendance: 11,000; Referee: Gerd Hennig (Duisburg)

26 August 1979 DFB-Pokal – R1	SC Viktoria 04 Köln	1 – 0	Tennis Borussia Berlin	Sportpark Höhenberg, Cologne
	Großmann 83'; Albert (yellow card)	Report	K. Hanisch (yellow card); Marczewski (red card) 65'	Attendance: 2,000; Referee: Rainer Schnetgöke (Essen)

1 September 1979 2. Bundesliga	Tennis Borussia Berlin	3 – 0	Alemannia Aachen	Mommsenstadion, Berlin
15:00	Stolzenburg 5'; Arbinger 56'; Grunenberg 64'; Arbinger (yellow card)	Report	Kucharski (yellow card) Balke (yellow card)	Attendance: 1,600; Referee: Rainer Waltert (Paderborn)

7 September 1979 2. Bundesliga	VfL Osnabrück	3 – 2	Tennis Borussia Berlin	Stadion an der Bremer Brücke, Osnabrück
19:00	Olaidotter 54' (pen.); Feilzer 58'; Lehmann 64'	Report	F. Hanisch 53'; Hansen 63'	Attendance: 6,000; Referee: Max Milkert (Dortmund)

14 September 1979 2. Bundesliga	Tennis Borussia Berlin	2 – 4	Rot-Weiss Essen	Mommsenstadion, Berlin
19:00	Grunenberg 57', 84'; K. Hanisch (yellow card)	Report	Kaminsky 35'; Herget 68', 90'; Sekula 73'	Attendance: 1,800; Referee: Klaus-Peter Zittrich (Isernhagen)

21 September 1979 2. Bundesliga	Tennis Borussia Berlin	6 – 1	Rot-Weiß Oberhausen	Mommsenstadion, Berlin
19:00	Ziegert 9'; Schilling 26', 87' (pen.); Stolzenburg 41'; Hochheimer 45', 75'	Report	Nabrotzki 59' (pen.); Skandera (yellow card)	Attendance: 1,500; Referee: Wilfried Heitmann (Drentwede)

5 October 1979 2. Bundesliga	SC Preußen Münster	1 – 2	Tennis Borussia Berlin	Preußenstadion, Münster
19:00	Mense 64'; Fuchs (yellow card)	Report	Stolzenburg 65'; Grunenberg 81'; Schilling (yellow card) Hochheimer (yellow card)	Attendance: 3,100; Referee: Jörg Glasneck (Bremen)

19 October 1979 2. Bundesliga	Tennis Borussia Berlin	1 – 2	Hannover 96	Mommsenstadion, Berlin
19:00	Stolzenburg 43'	Report	Hayduk 29'; Kinkeldey 82'	Attendance: 3,200; Referee: Dieter Pauly (Rheydt)

26 October 1979 2. Bundesliga	Rot-Weiß Lüdenscheid	5 – 1	Tennis Borussia Berlin	Nattenberg-Stadion, Lüdenscheid
19:00	Karadžić 2' (o.g.); Seiler 51'; Petković 56' (pen.); Wolf 68'; Holtkamp 86'; Grzelak (yellow card)	Report	Ziegert 29'	Attendance: 5,000; Referee: Werner Burgers (Essen)

2 November 1979 2. Bundesliga	Tennis Borussia Berlin	1 – 1	SC Viktoria 04 Köln	Mommsenstadion, Berlin
19:00	Stolzenburg 15'; Stolzenburg (yellow card) Ziegert (yellow card)	Report	Mall 65'; Mall (yellow card)	Attendance: 1,000; Referee: Hans-Joachim Osmers (Bremen)

9 November 1979 2. Bundesliga	SC Fortuna Köln	2 – 0	Tennis Borussia Berlin	Südstadion, Cologne
19:00	Mödrath 25', 44'	Report	Grunenberg (yellow card) Schilling (yellow card)	Attendance: 1,200; Referee: Bernd Vordanz

16 November 1979 2. Bundesliga	Tennis Borussia Berlin	1 – 1	SG Wattenscheid 09	Mommsenstadion, Berlin
19:00	Schilling 81'; Hochheimer (yellow card)	Report	Tinnefeld 58'; Brandt (yellow card) Jakobs (yellow card) Hammes (yellow card)	Attendance: 1,100; Referee: Hans-Gerd Kohnen (Hückelhoven)

23 November 1979 2. Bundesliga	SC Herford	2 – 2	Tennis Borussia Berlin	Friedrich-Ludwig-Jahn-Stadion, Herford
19:00	Heddinghaus 15'; Wehmeier 26'; Wehmeier (yellow card)	Report	Schmitz 64'; Stolzenburg 66'; F. Hanisch (yellow card) Ziegert (yellow card)	Attendance: 2,500; Referee: Hans-Heinrich Barnick (Schenefeld)

30 November 1979 2. Bundesliga	Tennis Borussia Berlin	1 – 1	OSC Bremerhaven	Mommsenstadion, Berlin
19:00	Stolzenburg 52'; Schilling (yellow card)	Report	Amiq 65'	Attendance: 800; Referee: Dieter Stäglich (Bonn)

7 December 1979 2. Bundesliga	OSV Hannover	1 – 1	Tennis Borussia Berlin	Oststadtstadion, Hannover
19:00	Poesger 84'; Staigies (yellow card)	Report	Rischker 41' (o.g.); Ziegert (yellow card) Grunenberg (yellow card)	Attendance: 700; Referee: Manfred Wichmann (Gelsenkirchen)

19 January 1980 2. Bundesliga	Tennis Borussia Berlin	0 – 2	Holstein Kiel	Mommsenstadion, Berlin
19:00		Report	Stelzer 48'; Jordt 76'	Attendance: 700; Referee: Rüdiger Wuttke (Oberhausen)

8 February 1980 2. Bundesliga	DSC Wanne-Eickel	1 – 1	Tennis Borussia Berlin	Stadion im Sportpark Wanne-Süd, Herne
19:00	Rothe 44'; Eigenwillig (yellow card)	Report	Grunenberg 24'; Endrulat (yellow card) Grunenberg (yellow card) Salewski (yellow card)	Attendance: 2,500; Referee: Joachim Schoen (Mulmshorn)

15 February 1980 2. Bundesliga	Tennis Borussia Berlin	2 – 0	Wuppertaler SV	Mommsenstadion, Berlin
19:00	Stolzenburg 24', 60'	Report	Allig (yellow card)	Attendance: 800; Referee: Joachim Kautschor (Eschweiler)

22 February 1980 2. Bundesliga	Tennis Borussia Berlin	1 – 2	Arminia Bielefeld	Mommsenstadion, Berlin
19:00	Karadžić 11'; Ziegert (yellow card)	Report	Sackewitz 20'; Pagelsdorf 55'; Büscher (yellow card)	Attendance: 2,100; Referee: Walter Niemann (Hamburg)

29 February 1980 2. Bundesliga	Alemannia Aachen	1 – 2	Tennis Borussia Berlin	Tivoli, Aachen
19:00	Bertrams 8'	Report	Stolzenburg 14', 90'; Grunenberg (yellow card) Salewski (yellow card)	Attendance: 2,800; Referee: Gerd Fiene (Herne)

7 March 1980 2. Bundesliga	Tennis Borussia Berlin	1 – 1	VfL Osnabrück	Mommsenstadion, Berlin
19:00	Stolzenburg 55'	Report	Gerth 45'	Attendance: 1,200; Referee: Gerald Kespohl (Detmold)

14 March 1980 2. Bundesliga	Rot-Weiss Essen	2 – 3	Tennis Borussia Berlin	Georg-Melches-Stadion, Essen
19:00	Karadžić 39' (o.g.); Kaminsky 75'; Saric (yellow card)	Report	Schilling 12'; Stolzenburg 33', 44'; Schulz (yellow card) Stolzenburg (red card) 80'	Attendance: 5,400; Referee: Hans Wahmann (Gelsenkirchen)

21 March 1980 2. Bundesliga	Rot-Weiß Oberhausen	3 – 0	Tennis Borussia Berlin	Niederrheinstadion, Oberhausen
19:00	Skandera 21'; Halbe 68', 78'	Report	Ziegert (yellow card) Grunenberg (yellow card)	Attendance: 1,500; Referee: Michael Malbranc (Hamburg)

28 March 1980 2. Bundesliga	Tennis Borussia Berlin	0 – 3	SC Preußen Münster	Mommsenstadion, Berlin
19:00		Report	Schütte 75'; Lander 80'; Mense 83'	Attendance: 1,000; Referee: Wolf-Rüdiger Umbach (Rottdorf)

3 April 1980 2. Bundesliga	Tennis Borussia Berlin	1 – 2	SG Union Solingen	Mommsenstadion, Berlin
19:00	Stolzenburg 79'; Stolzenburg (yellow card)	Report	Seegler 42'; Elm 51'	Attendance: 900; Referee: Peter Mölm (Bremerhaven)

7 April 1980 2. Bundesliga	SV Arminia Hannover	0 – 2	Tennis Borussia Berlin	Stadion am Bischofsholer Damm, Hanover
19:00		Report	Ziegert 30'; Stolzenburg 82'; Marczewski (yellow card)	Attendance: 500; Referee: Gerd Fiene (Herne)

11 April 1980 2. Bundesliga	Hannover 96	1 – 0	Tennis Borussia Berlin	Niedersachsenstadion, Hanover
19:00	Mrosko 72'; Mrosko (yellow card)	Report		Attendance: 8,200; Referee: Heinz Teichert (Löhne)

18 April 1980 2. Bundesliga	Tennis Borussia Berlin	2 – 1	Rot-Weiß Lüdenscheid	Mommsenstadion, Berlin
19:00	Stolzenburg 29'; Marczewski 89'; Grunenberg (yellow card)	Report	Bergter 54'	Attendance: 800; Referee: Jan Redelfs

25 April 1980 2. Bundesliga	SC Viktoria 04 Köln	3 – 1	Tennis Borussia Berlin	Sportpark Höhenberg, Cologne
19:00	Joachimsmeier 28'; Lüttges 48'; Mall 81'	Report	Salewski 75'; Schilling (yellow card)	Attendance: 1,200; Referee: Dieter Gathmann (Wattenscheid)

2 May 1980 2. Bundesliga	Tennis Borussia Berlin	2 – 1	SC Fortuna Köln	Mommsenstadion, Berlin
19:00	Grunenberg 49'; Stolzenburg 53'	Report	Lütkebohmert 40'	Attendance: 1,100; Referee: Gerd Lins (Elmschenhagen)

9 May 1980 2. Bundesliga	SG Wattenscheid 09	4 – 2	Tennis Borussia Berlin	Lohrheidestadion, Bochum–Wattenscheid
19:00	Hammes 2', 79'; Kunkel 30'; Patzke 77'	Report	Stolzenburg 11', 37'; Salewski (yellow card)	Attendance: 1,000; Referee: Walter Eschweiler (Euskirchen)

13 May 1980 2. Bundesliga	Tennis Borussia Berlin	3 – 0	SC Herford	Mommsenstadion, Berlin
19:30	Stolzenburg 7', 84', 90'; Ziegert (yellow card)	Report	Wehmeier (yellow card) Stremming (yellow card) Suchanek (yellow card)	Attendance: 900; Referee: Detlef Eggers (Hamburg)

17 May 1980 2. Bundesliga	OSC Bremerhaven	0 – 0	Tennis Borussia Berlin	Nordseestadion, Bremerhaven
15:00	Linz (yellow card) Amiq (yellow card)	Report	Salewski (yellow card) Grunenberg (yellow card)	Attendance: 2,800; Referee: Bernd Vordanz

23 May 1980 2. Bundesliga	Tennis Borussia Berlin	0 – 0	OSV Hannover	Mommsenstadion, Berlin
19:00		Report	Knopf (yellow card)	Attendance: 800; Referee: Günther Risse (Hattingen)

30 May 1980 2. Bundesliga	Wuppertaler SV	0 – 1	Tennis Borussia Berlin	Stadion am Zoo, Wuppertal
19:00		Report	Grunenberg 7'; Schmitz (yellow card)	Attendance: 200; Referee: Walter Niemann (Hamburg)

== Player statistics ==
Pos	Player	Apps	Goals	Apps	Goals	Apps	Goals
Pos	Player	2. Bundesliga		DFB-Pokal		Total	
MF	(West Germany) Fred Arbinger	15	2	1	0	16	2
GK	(West Germany) Peter Endrulat	38	0	1	0	39	0
FW	(West Germany) Thomas Grunenberg	33	9	1	0	34	9
DF	(West Germany) Frank Hanisch	29	1	0	0	29	1
DF	(West Germany) Klaus-Peter Hanisch	15	0	1	0	16	0
FW	(Denmark) Allan Hansen	7	1	1	0	8	1
MF	(West Germany) Andreas Hinze	2	0	0	0	2	0
DF	(West Germany) Dieter Hochheimer	16	3	1	0	17	3
DF	(Socialist Federal Republic of Yugoslavia) Momir Karadžić	36	2	0	0	36	2
FW	(West Germany) Manfred Krüger	5	0	0	0	5	0
MF	(West Germany) Nico Lazaridis	3	0	0	0	3	0
DF	(West Germany) Frank-Michael Marczewski	29	2	1	0	30	2
MF	(West Germany) Ralf Nettelbeck	1	0	0	0	1	0
MF	(West Germany) Hans-Jürgen Salewski	18	1	0	0	18	1
MF	(West Germany) Jürgen Schäfer	6	0	0	0	6	0
MF	(West Germany) Wolfgang Schilling	35	5	0	0	35	5
MF	(West Germany) Peter Schmidt	2	0	0	0	2	0
MF	(West Germany) Norbert Schmitz	23	2	1	0	24	2
MF	(West Germany) Peter Schultz	3	0	0	0	3	0
MF	(West Germany) Jürgen Schulz	33	0	1	0	34	0
FW	(West Germany) Norbert Stolzenburg	33	24	1	0	34	24
FW	(West Germany) Peter Vogel	33	1	1	0	34	1
GK	(West Germany) Thomas Vogt	1	0	0	0	1	0
DF	(West Germany) Jochem Ziegert	34	3	0	0	34	3

== Final league position – 13th ==
1979–80 2. Fußball-Bundesliga Nord: extract from the final league table
Pos	Team	Pld	W	D	L	GF	GA	GD	Points
1	Arminia Bielefeld (C)	38	30	6	2	120	31	+89	66:10
12	OSV Hannover	38	13	10	15	55	79	–24	36:40
13	Tennis Borussia Berlin	38	13	9	16	57	65	–8	35:41
14	Holstein Kiel	38	13	7	18	61	67	–6	33:43
20	Wuppertaler SV (R)	38	5	6	27	35	84	–49	16:60
