= Pahl =

Pahl may refer to:

== People ==
- Greg Pahl (born 1946), American journalist, author and energy activist
- Hans-Heinrich Pahl (born 1960), German soccer player and manager
- Jürgen Pahl (born 1956), German soccer goalkeeper
- Kate Pahl (born 1962), British linguist
- Milt Pahl (born 1943), Canadian politician and businessman
- Ray Pahl (1935–2011), British sociologist
- Vernon Pahl (born 1957), Canadian football player
- Pahl Davis (1897–1943), American football player
- Witold Pahl (born 1961), Polish politician

== Locations ==
- Henry Pahl House, a listed building in Davenport, Iowa, U.S.
- PAHL, the ICAO identifier of Huslia Airport

== See also ==
- Pähl, a municipality in Bavaria, Germany
- Pahlen, a municipality in Schleswig-Holstein, Germany
- Pahlen, a noble family of Baltic German origin
