= List of Arminia Bielefeld players =

Arminia Bielefeld is a German professional football club based in Bielefeld, North Rhine-Westphalia.

This list features all footballers who appeared in at least 50 league matches since 1963.

== List of players ==
Table headers

- Nationality – If a player played international football, the country/countries he played for are shown. Otherwise, the player's nationality is given as their country of birth.
- from, to – The year of the player's first appearance for Arminia Bielefeld and the year of his last appearance.
- Games – The number of games played.
- Goals – The number of goals scored.

List of Arminia Bielefeld players with at least 50 appearances
Name	Nationality	from	to	Games	Goals
Eduard Angele	Germany	1976	1981	132	3
Karim Bagheri	Iran	1997	2000	51	6
Rolf Bahr	Germany	1974	1976	60	0
Helmut Balke	Germany	1974	1976	67	10
Wolfgang Berg	Germany	1974	1977	63	0
Isaac Boakye	Ghana	2003	2006	60	24
Jörg Bode	Germany	1988	2004	233	13
Daniel Bogusz	Poland	2001	2005	56	0
Jörg Böhme	Germany	1998	2008	102	8
Marcio Borges	Brazil	1999	2007	140	8
Ulrich Braun	Germany	1967	1972	164	23
Kees Bregmann	Netherlands	1980	1982	60	0
Dieter Brei	Germany	1970	1973	59	10
Ansgar Brinkmann	Germany	2001	2003	57	7
Werner Brosda	Germany	1974	1976	61	6
Karl-Heinz Brücken	Germany	1970	1973	75	16
Hans-Jörg Brückner	Germany	1990	1992	58	7
Uli Büscher	Germany	1977	1987	182	5
Christoph Dabrowski	Germany	2001	2003	57	5
Georg Damjanoff	Germany	1971	1973	53	8
Peter Damman	Germany	1963	1970	106	30
Detlev Dammeier	Germany	2000	2006	168	10
Jean-Paul de Jong	Netherlands	1989	1992	71	5
Mamadou Diabang	Senegal	2000	2003	60	13
Rolf Donnermann	Germany	1963	1967	78	0
René Dörfel	Germany	1990	1996	115	6
Norbert Dronia	Germany	1980	1985	110	8
Christian Eigler	Germany	2006	aktiv	55	12
Norbert Eilenfeldt	Germany	1976	1988	232	81
Andreas Ellguth	Germany	1983	1988	117	8
Uwe Erich	Germany	1964	1969	68	11
Dietmar Erler	Germany	1966	1968	66	21
Theodor Flieger	Germany	1963	1967	113	13
Petr Gabriel	Czech Republic	2003	2008	102	3
Frank Geideck	Germany	1988	1996	157	10
Karlheinz Geils	Germany	1980	1984	131	16
Jürgen Gelsdorf	Germany	1972	1976	120	4
Frank Germann	Germany	1992	1996	106	4
Thomas Gerstner	Germany	1985	1988	100	7
Rudolf Giersch	Germany	1963	1966	51	7
Andreas Golombek	Germany	1986	1990	99	24
Volker Grahl	Germany	1986	1989	74	7
Volker Graul	Germany	1973	1980	148	60
Gregor Grillemeier	Germany	1982	1984	59	14
Mathias Hain	Germany	2000	2008	243	0
Erwin Heidinger	Germany	1963	1966	73	0
Johnny Hey	Germany	1973	1977	119	24
Peter Hobday	England	1994	1997	73	9
André Hofschneider	Germany	1998	2002	79	1
Dirk Hupe	Germany	1981	1985	121	8
Jonas Kamper	Denmark	2006	aktiv	60	9
Gerd Kasperski	Germany	1971	1973	57	10
Rüdiger Kauf	Germany	2001	aktiv	204	6
Detlef Kemena	Germany	1965	1974	126	9
Bernd Kirchner	Germany	1963	1970	177	37
Volker Klein	Germany	1970	1974	60	1
Uwe Kleina	Germany	1967	1969	60	0
Alexander Klitzpera	Germany	1999	2002	74	5
Christian Knehans	Germany	1987	1991	55	15
Wolfgang Kneib	Germany	1980	1993	370	3
Gerd Knoth	Germany	1968	1973	130	8
Georg Koch	Germany	1997	2000	72	0
Gerd Kohl	Germany	1968	1971	60	5
Ulrich Kohn	Germany	1964	1966	66	32
Martin Kollenberg	Germany	1986	1995	170	21
Klaus Köller	Germany	1965	1971	138	5
Dirk Konerding	Germany	1986	1993	143	11
Roland Kopp	Germany	1988	1996	97	5
Torsten Köppe	Germany	1991	1993	53	6
Bernd Korzynietz	Germany	2005	aktiv	75	0
Lorenz-Günther Köstner	Germany	1977	1981	98	7
Peter Krobbach	Germany	1978	1982	98	7
Radim Kucera	Germany	2005	aktiv	73	7
Stefan Kuntz	Germany	1998	1998	65	25
Marco Küntzel	Germany	2003	2006	68	10
Ernst Kuster	Germany	1966	1971	141	111
Bruno Labbadia	Germany	1998	2001	98	50
Benjamin Lense	Germany	2002	2005	56	2
Norbert Leopoldseder	Germany	1967	1974	180	18
Ewald Lienen	Germany	1974	1983	156	36
Hans-Dieter Lömm	Germany	1967	1969	50	9
Manfred Lonnemann	Germany	1988	1992	89	26
Rob Maas	Netherlands	1996	1998	56	3
Thorben Marx	Germany	2006	aktiv	51	1
Ronald Maul	Germany	1995	2000	131	9
Manfred Menzel	Germany	1963	1967	104	4
Heiko Meier	Germany	1979	1991	56	2
Gerrit Meinke	Germany	1989	1992	86	44
Silvio Meißner	Germany	1996	2000	114	13
Wolfgang Mittendorf	Germany	1971	1978	154	7
Hans-Werner Moors	Germany	1976	1980	121	10
Alexander Ogrinc	Germany	1992	1995	89	0
Thomas Ostermann	Germany	1985	1990	98	5
Dirk Otten	Germany	1989	1993	101	23
Patrick Owomoyela	Germany	2003	2005	63	8
Kazuo Ozaki	Japan	1983	1988	113	18
Frank Pagelsdorf	Germany	1978	1984	164	34
Jacky Peeters	Belgium	1998	2000	57	3
Roland Peitsch	Germany	1975	1981	171	32
Wolfgang Pohl	Germany	1973	1985	331	19
Massimilian Porcello	Germany	2000	2006	108	12
Peter Quallo	Germany	1993	1997	70	1
Pasi Rautiainen	Finland	1982	1986	113	16
Jörg Reeb	Germany	1995	1998	95	6
Giuseppe Reina	Italy Germany	1996	1999	97	22
Bastian Reinhardt	Germany	2000	2003	99	8
Andreas Ridder	Germany	1985	1995	211	11
Gerd Roggensack	Germany	1963	1974	226	69
Werner Ruchel	Germany	1963	1968	93	16
René Rydlewicz	Germany	1997	2000	69	5
Christian Sackewitz	Germany	1976	1981	150	61
Asif Saric	Croatia	1992	1994	50	9
Wolfgang Schilling	Germany	1973	1978	165	17
Detlev Schnier	Germany	1979	1988	201	3
Gerd-Volker Schock	Germany	1979	1982	94	44
Helmut Schröder	Germany	1977	1988	313	34
Markus Schuler	Germany	2004	aktiv	113	0
Dieter Schulz	Germany	1963	1974	255	15
Gerd Siese	Germany	1966	1977	245	0
Damir Simac	Yugoslavia	1986	1991	68	0
Günter Srowig	Germany	1974	1976	57	8
Uli Stein	Germany	1976	1997	193	0
Michael Sternkopf	Germany	1997	2002	80	4
Horst Stockhausen	Germany	1967	1971	123	11
Thomas Stratos	Greece Germany	1988	2001	246	19
Stefan Studtrucker	Germany	1991	1999	137	36
Georg Stürz	Germany	1967	1974	145	3
Andreas Triebel	Germany	1963	1970	120	0
Dirk van der Ven	Germany	1999	2003	78	8
Fatmir Vata	Albania	2001	2007	128	19
Thomas von Heesen	Germany	1994	1997	64	15
Fritz Walter	Germany	1994	1997	50	25
Bernd Wehmeyer	Germany	1971	1976	57	2
Roland Weidle	Germany	1978	1980	51	1
Markus Weissenberger	Austria	1999	2001	54	12
Horst Wenzel	Germany	1969	1972	73	6
Heiko Westermann	Germany	2005	2007	67	5
Matthias Westerwinter	Germany	1982	1990	109	30
Artur Wichniarek	Poland	1999	aktiv	175	70
Hans-Jürgen Wloka	Germany	1972	1974	59	6
Peter Wloka	Germany	1972	1974	53	4
Manfred Wolf	Germany	1974	1978	113	15
Horst Wohlers	Germany	1982	1986	122	4
Markus Wuckel	Germany	1993	1995	50	25
Sibusiso Zuma	South Africa	2005	aktiv	69	8
