= Malura =

Malura is a surname. Notable people with the surname include:

- Dennis Malura (born 1984), German footballer, son of Edmund
- Edmund Malura (born 1955), German footballer and manager
- Pavel Malura (born 1970), Czech football manager
