= 1987–88 2. Bundesliga =

14th season of the second-tier football league in Germany

2. Bundesliga
- Season: 1987–88
- Champions: Stuttgarter Kickers
- Promoted: Stuttgarter Kickers; FC St. Pauli
- Relegated: Rot-Weiß Oberhausen; BVL Remscheid; SSV Ulm 1846; Arminia Bielefeld
- Matches: 380
- Top goalscorer: Souleyman Sané (21 goals)
- Average attendance: 4,484

The 1987–88 2. Bundesliga season was the fourteenth season of the 2. Bundesliga, the second tier of the German football league system.

Stuttgarter Kickers and FC St. Pauli were promoted to the Bundesliga while Rot-Weiß Oberhausen, BVL 08 Remscheid, SSV Ulm 1846 and Arminia Bielefeld were relegated to the Oberliga.

== League table ==
For the 1987–88 season Kickers Offenbach, SpVgg Bayreuth, SV Meppen and BVL 08 Remscheid were newly promoted to the 2. Bundesliga from the Oberliga while SpVgg Blau-Weiß 1890 Berlin and Fortuna Düsseldorf had been relegated to the league from the Bundesliga.

Locations of the participating teams of the 1987–88 season

Pos	Team	Pld	W	D	L	GF	GA	GD	Pts	Promotion, qualification or relegation
1	Stuttgarter Kickers (C, P)	38	19	13	6	89	49	+40	51	Promotion to Bundesliga
2	FC St. Pauli (P)	38	19	11	8	65	38	+27	49	Promotion to Bundesliga
3	Darmstadt 98	38	16	15	7	48	32	+16	47	Qualification to promotion play-offs
4	SG Wattenscheid 09	38	18	11	9	62	48	+14	47	
5	Fortuna Düsseldorf	38	20	6	12	63	38	+25	46	
6	Alemannia Aachen	38	17	12	9	60	45	+15	46	
7	Blau-Weiß 90 Berlin	38	16	11	11	65	48	+17	43	
8	Kickers Offenbach	38	13	13	12	56	49	+7	39	
9	VfL Osnabrück	38	13	12	13	47	47	0	38	
10	SC Freiburg	38	13	12	13	61	63	−2	38	
11	Rot-Weiss Essen	38	11	12	15	53	60	−7	34	
12	Fortuna Köln	38	15	4	19	58	67	−9	34	
13	1. FC Saarbrücken	38	12	10	16	57	67	−10	34	
14	SV Meppen	38	12	10	16	55	72	−17	34	
15	SG Union Solingen	38	12	10	16	48	65	−17	34	
16	Rot-Weiß Oberhausen (Note: Rot-Weiss Oberhausen had their license revoked and were therefore relegated.) (R)	38	13	7	18	48	54	−6	33	Relegation to Oberliga
17	SpVgg Bayreuth	38	14	5	19	55	66	−11	33	
18	FC Remscheid (R)	38	11	7	20	54	74	−20	29	Relegation to Oberliga
19	SSV Ulm 1846 (R)	38	12	5	21	51	75	−24	29	Relegation to Oberliga
20	Arminia Bielefeld (R)	38	6	10	22	29	67	−38	22	Relegation to Oberliga

Source: Bundesliga.de
Rules for classification: 1) points; 2) goal difference; 3) number of goals scored.
(C) Champions; (P) Promoted; (R) Relegated

== Results ==
Home \ Away	AAC	BAY	BWB	DSC	D98	F95	RWE	SCF	FKO	SVM	RWO	KOF	OSN	REM	FCS	SGU	STP	SKI	ULM	SGW
Alemannia Aachen	—	2–1	1–0	3–0	1–1	4–0	1–1	0–0	2–0	4–1	2–1	0–2	3–0	2–1	4–2	2–2	1–0	1–0	5–0	1–3
SpVgg Bayreuth	2–3	—	0–0	2–0	0–1	1–0	3–2	5–1	2–0	0–1	3–0	2–0	0–2	3–1	2–1	4–1	1–3	3–0	2–1	0–0
Blau-Weiß 90 Berlin	2–2	3–0	—	2–1	2–0	1–1	1–1	3–1	1–0	3–0	3–1	1–0	1–0	6–0	2–2	3–0	2–2	1–1	4–1	3–1
Arminia Bielefeld	0–0	3–1	2–1	—	0–1	0–0	0–0	3–3	0–2	2–0	1–0	0–2	0–0	1–3	1–1	0–1	0–1	2–2	0–0	2–1
Darmstadt 98	0–0	2–0	0–2	5–0	—	1–0	2–1	1–1	1–0	1–1	3–0	1–1	1–1	3–1	3–2	3–1	0–0	2–0	1–0	1–1
Fortuna Düsseldorf	3–0	1–0	2–1	4–1	0–1	—	2–1	0–2	0–2	3–1	3–0	0–1	1–0	6–2	4–2	1–2	0–0	4–0	3–0	2–1
Rot-Weiss Essen	4–0	2–0	2–1	1–1	2–1	1–1	—	2–1	1–0	1–2	2–1	1–3	2–2	3–1	1–1	1–2	2–2	2–3	3–0	2–1
SC Freiburg	3–0	5–1	0–0	3–0	1–1	1–1	3–0	—	1–6	4–2	2–1	3–2	2–1	3–0	1–1	4–0	1–1	3–2	0–3	1–3
Fortuna Köln	0–3	2–1	3–2	3–1	1–0	0–2	5–1	3–1	—	1–1	0–4	4–2	2–1	2–1	2–4	5–3	2–0	2–2	2–0	1–2
SV Meppen	1–0	0–2	2–3	3–2	1–1	0–2	1–1	3–3	3–2	—	2–0	3–3	3–0	3–2	1–0	1–1	1–1	1–1	4–2	2–1
Rot-Weiß Oberhausen	3–1	4–1	3–0	2–2	0–0	2–0	3–1	5–0	0–0	0–1	—	2–2	3–1	1–0	1–0	0–0	1–6	0–3	2–1	0–1
Kickers Offenbach	0–0	3–3	3–0	2–0	1–1	1–3	2–0	1–1	2–0	3–0	3–1	—	2–4	1–2	1–1	0–0	3–1	1–1	3–0	2–2
VfL Osnabrück	1–1	1–1	1–0	2–0	1–2	3–2	1–1	0–1	3–0	3–2	1–2	1–1	—	1–0	1–2	3–1	1–0	1–1	1–1	2–1
BVL Remscheid	1–3	5–2	2–2	1–2	3–0	0–1	1–1	0–0	2–0	6–3	1–0	1–1	0–2	—	2–1	0–1	3–1	2–2	1–0	1–5
1. FC Saarbrücken	2–2	2–2	4–2	2–0	0–2	1–2	1–1	2–1	3–0	2–0	1–0	1–0	2–3	3–1	—	3–2	0–2	1–1	0–2	1–1
Union Solingen	1–4	0–3	2–2	5–0	1–0	0–3	1–0	2–1	3–1	2–1	1–1	1–0	0–0	1–2	1–3	—	0–3	2–2	2–2	3–1
FC St. Pauli	1–1	3–1	1–0	2–0	3–2	2–2	4–2	1–1	5–1	2–0	2–0	3–0	1–1	0–0	2–0	1–0	—	0–2	4–3	3–1
Stuttgarter Kickers	1–0	5–0	3–0	1–0	1–1	2–1	4–1	4–2	2–2	6–3	2–1	2–0	2–0	4–2	7–0	2–2	2–1	—	1–3	6–1
SSV Ulm	4–0	3–1	2–4	3–1	2–2	0–3	1–3	2–0	3–1	2–1	0–1	1–2	1–1	2–1	3–0	1–0	0–1	0–8	—	1–2
SG Wattenscheid	1–1	3–0	1–1	2–1	0–0	1–0	1–0	1–0	2–1	0–0	2–2	2–0	2–0	2–2	4–3	2–1	1–0	1–1	5–1	—

Source: DFB
Legend: Blue = home team win; Yellow = draw; Red = away team win.

== Top scorers ==
The league's top scorers:

Goals	Player	Team
21	(Senegal) Souleyman Sané	SC Freiburg
19	(Germany) Theo Gries	Alemannia Aachen
18	(Germany) Frank Kremer	BVL 08 Remscheid
17	(Germany) Waldemar Steubing	SSV Ulm 1846
17	(Germany) Dirk Zander	FC St. Pauli
16	(Germany) Bernd Grabosch	Stuttgarter Kickers
16	(Germany) Dieter Müller	Kickers Offenbach
16	(Germany) Thorsten Schlumberger	SpVgg Blau-Weiß 1890 Berlin
16	(Germany) Rüdiger Wenzel	FC St. Pauli
15	(Germany) Heikko Glöde	VfL Osnabrück
