= Borussia Mönchengladbach 12–0 Borussia Dortmund =

Borussia Mönchengladbach v Borussia Dortmund
- Event: 1977–78 Bundesliga; Matchday 34
Borussia Mönchengladbach	Borussia Dortmund
12	0
- Date: 29 April 1978
- Venue: Rheinstadion, Düsseldorf
- Man of the Match: Jupp Heynckes (Borussia Mönchengladbach)
- Referee: Ferdinand Biwersi (Bliesransbach)
- Attendance: 38,000

On 29 April 1978, the final match day of the 1977–78 Fußball-Bundesliga season, Borussia Mönchengladbach played Borussia Dortmund with the possibility of winning the Bundesliga championship. Knowing that if 1. FC Köln won their game away to FC St. Pauli, Borussia Mönchengladbach would have to win by a margin well in excess of ten goals. The match finished 12–0, which remains the largest margin of victory and tied with four other matches for the biggest win in Bundesliga history. However, 1. FC Köln beat FC St. Pauli 5–0 to become champions.

== Background ==
Borussia Mönchengladbach went into the match with Borussia Dortmund as reigning Bundesliga champions of the previous season. Having only won two of their first seven league games in the autumn of 1977, they had managed to reach second place in the table after 22 games. With the final round of games, the league championship went down to the wire with both Mönchengladbach and their regional rivals 1. FC Köln equal on points, but Köln having a far superior goal difference of +10.

Borussia Dortmund, on the other hand, were struggling to gain ground in their second consecutive season in the Bundesliga after promotion in 1976. Three games previously, the club had secured their Bundesliga status for the following year with a 2–0 away win over FC Schalke 04. Horst Bertram, Dortmund's number one goalkeeper, had just recovered from injury, but Dortmund's coach Otto Rehhagel decided to start with second-choice goalie Peter Endrulat, giving him a chance to present himself. Endrulat, however, was told the morning before the game, that his contract would not be extended close-season.

The two teams had drawn 3–3 at Dortmund's Westfalenstadion in December 1977, with Gladbach only claiming a point through an equalising goal in the 89th minute.

== Match ==
=== Summary ===
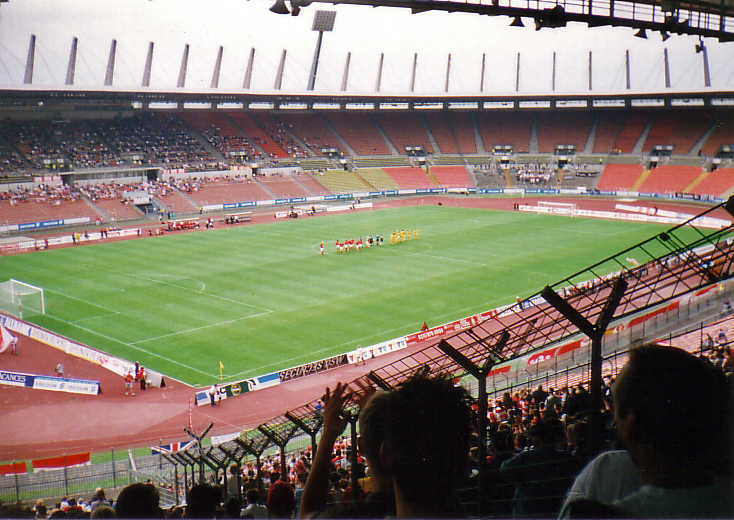
The Rheinstadion in Düsseldorf, scene of Borussia Mönchengladbach's record Bundesliga victory

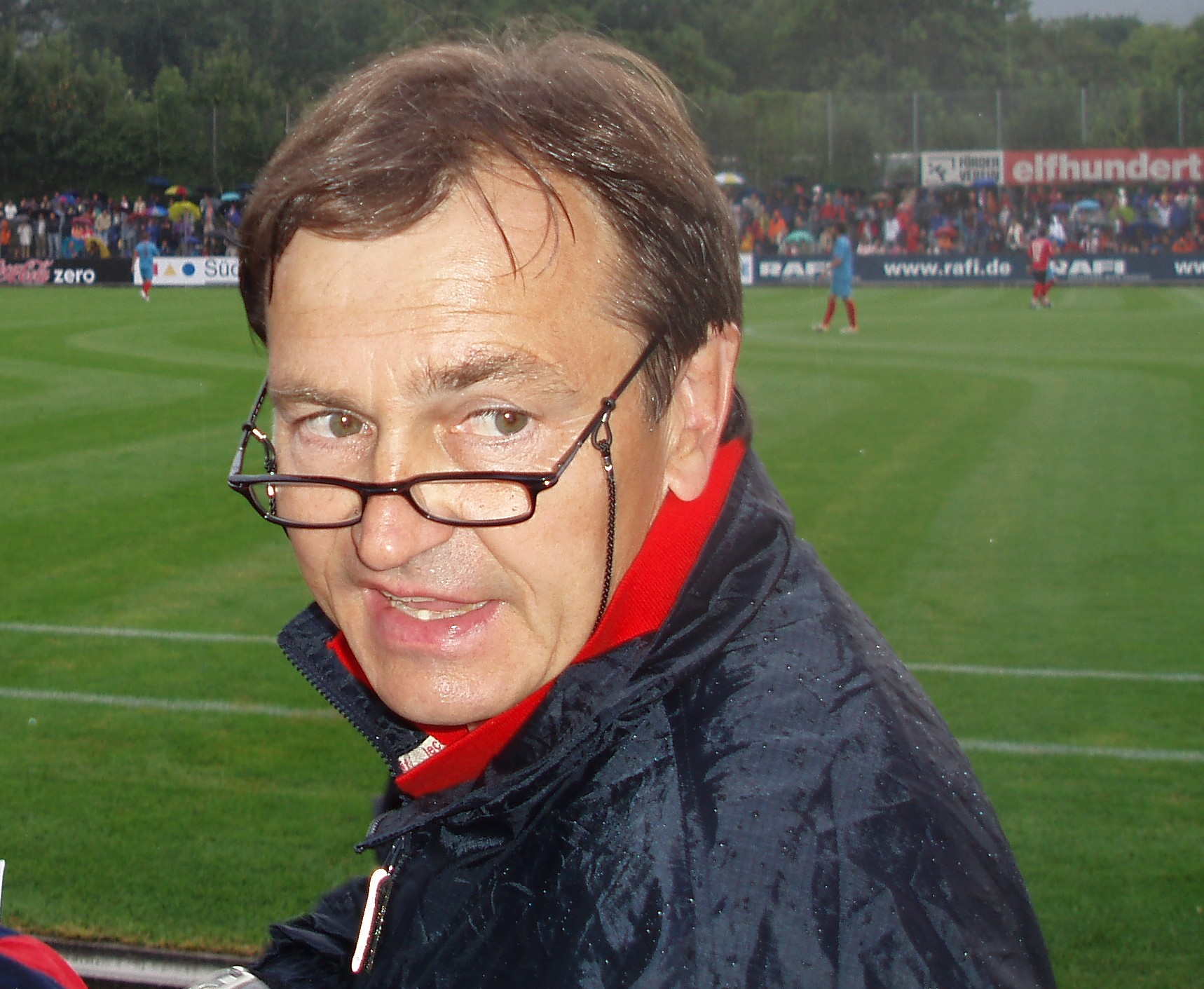
Ewald Lienen came off the bench to score the penultimate goal in the 12–0 win

38,000 fans made it to the Rheinstadion in Düsseldorf since Mönchengladbach's usual home ground, the Bökelbergstadion, was being renovated. The match was refereed by Ferdinand Biwersi.

Although Mönchengladbach were not anticipating to win what would have been their sixth Bundesliga title, they were, nonetheless, highly motivated going into the game. Jupp Heynckes gave the home side the lead after just one minute of playing time had elapsed and in the 32nd minute, had made it 5–0 with his third goal of the game to complete his hat-trick. Going into the half-time break, the score was 6–0.

Otto Rehhagel gave a brief talk to his players during at half-time, calling upon the team to play on for their honour. No substitutes were made since no player from the bench wanted to come onto the pitch. Rehhagel asked Endrulat if he would like to be substituted, but the Dortmund goalkeeper said he had no problem with playing on. He later concluded however that this had been the wrong decision:

When I think about it today, I realise I should have left the field at half-time. Then, at least, Horst Bertram would have let in six of the goals. I'm absolutely certain of that. Most people forget that I actually saved a lot of shots, at least those which were indeed possible to save.

— Peter Endrulat

In the second half, Mönchengladbach's flurry of shots on goal didn't stop. Heynckes and Carsten Nielsen had made it 8–0 by the hour mark, at which time Otto Rehhagel had asked Sigfried Held to warm-up and get ready to go onto the pitch, but Held declined, saying: "Coach, do you really think I can make a difference to the outcome of the game?" Shortly afterwards, Karl Del'Haye had made the scoreline 9–0.

People were asking from the bench how many more goals we'd need to score in order to beat Köln to the title. While the score was 9–0, they wanted three more, to which I replied "have you gone crazy?"

— Jupp Heynckes

After further goals from Heynckes, substitute Ewald Lienen and Christian Kulik, the match finished with a final score of 12–0. Since there were no ball boys in the 1970s, the referee had to go and fetch the balls which had been shot past Dortmund's goal.

=== Details ===
29 April 1978
15:30 CET

Borussia Mönchengladbach	12–0	Borussia Dortmund
Heynckes 1', 12', 32', 59', 77'; Nielsen 13', 61'; Del'Haye 22', 66'; Wimmer 38'; Lienen 87'; Kulik 90'	Report

Rheinstadion, Düsseldorf
Attendance: 38,000
Referee: Ferdinand Biwersi (Bliesransbach)

Borussia Mönchengladbach	Borussia Dortmund

GK	1	(West Germany) Wolfgang Kleff
CB	2	(West Germany) Berti Vogts
CB	4	(West Germany) Hans-Jürgen Wittkamp
CB	3	(West Germany) Wilfried Hannes
RM	6	(West Germany) Horst Wohlers
CM	10	(West Germany) Christian Kulik
CM	8	(West Germany) Herbert Wimmer (c)
LM	5	(Denmark) Carsten Nielsen
RW	9	(West Germany) Karl Del'Haye
CF	11	(West Germany) Jupp Heynckes
LW	7	(Denmark) Allan Simonsen	(substituted off) 77'
Substitutes:
MF	13	(West Germany) Ewald Lienen	(substituted on) 77'
Manager:
(West Germany) Udo Lattek

GK	1	(West Germany) Peter Endrulat
RB	3	(West Germany) Amand Theis
CB	2	(West Germany) Werner Schneider
CB	4	(West Germany) Lothar Huber
LB	5	(West Germany) Herbert Meyer
RM	7	(West Germany) Burkhard Segler
CM	6	(West Germany) Miroslav Votava
CM	11	(West Germany) Hans-Joachim Wagner
LM	8	(West Germany) Manfred Burgsmüller (c)
CF	9	(West Germany) Wolfgang Frank
CF	10	(West Germany) Peter Geyer
Manager:
(West Germany) Otto Rehhagel

Man of the Match:
(West Germany) Jupp Heynckes (Borussia Mönchengladbach)

== Aftermath ==
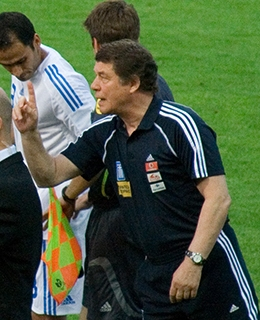
Borussia Dortmund coach Otto Rehhagel was sacked the day after the game

In spite of their 12–0 victory, Mönchengladbach missed out on the league title since 1. FC Köln beat FC St. Pauli 5–0 in Hamburg and became champions thanks to their slightly better goal difference. The supporters of St. Pauli had become skeptical when the intermediate results from Mönchengladbach had been announced and started to cheer for the team from Cologne. After the game they celebrated the championship with the guests, and a long-lasting friendship between the supporters of both teams started. This was 1. FC Köln's third and, as of 2026, last Bundesliga title.

1977–78 Fußball-Bundesliga: extract from the final league table
Pos	Team	Pld	W	D	L	GF	GA	GD	Points
1	1. FC Köln (C)	34	22	4	8	86	41	+45	48
2	Borussia Mönchengladbach	34	20	8	6	86	44	+42	48
11	Borussia Dortmund	34	14	5	15	57	71	–14	33

The day after Mönchengladbach's record victory, Rehhagel was fired from his post as Dortmund manager. Sigi Held was named as his replacement ad interim, and Carl-Heinz Rühl became the new coach on a permanent basis.

You can imagine just how happy we were after the referee blew the final whistle. After the catastrophe I drove home with Otto Rehhagel who was also living in Essen at the time. On the way back, he said to me there would be a new manager the next day. He knew what would happen, and it wasn't even his fault, but Rehhagel would be made the scapegoat to save face for the club.

— Borussia Dortmund captain Manfred Burgsmüller

Borussia Dortmund fined all of their players 2000–2500 Deutsche Mark for their shoddy performance. The goalkeeper, Peter Endrulat, was sent packing to 2. Bundesliga team Tennis Borussia Berlin and the team was ridiculed during friendly games for weeks afterwards. Köln's goalkeeper, Toni Schumacher, said he was "disgusted" by Dortmund's poor showing, but was "happy [Köln] had won the title in the end."

== Match-fixing suspicion ==
Suggestions from the supervisory committee of the German Football Association (German: Kontrollausschuss des Deutschen Fußball-Bundes) that the match had been fixed were contested by Borussia Dortmund. Defender Amand Theis explained that "in the end, every shot was a goal and we just gave up." Borussia Mönchengladbach's Herbert Wimmer, for whom the 12–0 victory was his final Bundesliga game, said in an interview that he was happy the club did not win the league that season, because it could have lent more support to speculations of match-fixing. The German FA made their own enquiries and interviewed the Dortmund players, giving them a dressing-down for their unsporting behaviour, but chose not to press any charges.

The corresponding fixture in the following season four months later at Mönchengladbach's Bökelbergstadion ended in a 2–2 draw.

== See also ==
- Barcelona 1–1 Atlético Madrid (May 2014)
- Liverpool F.C. 0–2 Arsenal F.C. (26 May 1989)
- Brazil v Germany (2014 FIFA World Cup)
- Barcelona 6–1 Paris Saint-Germain
- FC Barcelona 2–8 FC Bayern Munich
- Australia 31–0 American Samoa
