= Mischke =

Mischke is a surname. Notable people with the surname include:

- Anja Mischke (born 1967), German speed skater
- Frank Mischke (born 1961), German footballer
- Martin Mischke (1909–1993), American politician from Nebraska
- T. D. Mischke (born 1962), American writer, musician, podcaster, and former radio talk show host
