= Michael Muller =

Michael Muller or Müller may refer to:

- Michael Müller (bobsleigh) (born 1976), Austrian Olympic bobsledder
- Michael Muller (field hockey) (born 1965), Canadian former field hockey player
- Michael Müller (writer) (1825–1899), American Catholic writer
- Michael Müller (handballer) (born 1984), German handballer
- Michael Müller (footballer, born 1944), German footballer
- Michael Müller (footballer, born 1964), German footballer
- Michael Müller (footballer, born 1989), German footballer
- Michael Müller (politician, born 1948), German politician
- Michael Müller (politician, born 1964), German politician and mayor of Berlin
- Mike Muller (born 1971), American ice hockey player and coach
