= Dennis Malura =

German footballer

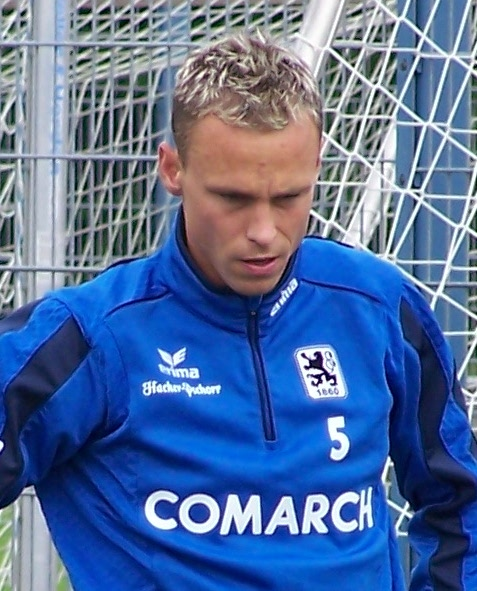
- Malura in 2011

Personal information
- Full name: Dennis Malura
- Date of birth: 20 June 1984 (age 42)
- Place of birth: West Berlin, West Germany
- Height: 1.86 m (6 ft 1 in)
- Position: Defender

Team information
- Current team: 1. FC Solingen
- Number: 4

Youth career
- Post SV Solingen
- 1. FC Monheim
- Fortuna Düsseldorf
- KFC Uerdingen 05

Senior career*
Years	Team	Apps	(Gls)
–2004	1. FC Union Solingen	49	(6)
2005–2008	Wuppertaler SV	86	(1)
2008–2009	Kickers Offenbach	11	(0)
2009–2011	Rot-Weiß Erfurt	66	(2)
2011	1860 Munich	3	(0)
2011	1860 Munich II	4	(1)
2012–2015	1. FC Heidenheim	84	(5)
2015–2016	Viktoria Köln	26	(3)
2016–2018	Rot-Weiss Essen	57	(3)
2018–2019	Wuppertaler SV	31	(1)
2019	TVD Velbert	0	(0)
2020–	1. FC Solingen	6	(1)
- * Club domestic league appearances and goals as of 23:31, 30 January 2021 (UTC)

Dennis Malura (born 20 June 1984) is a German professional footballer who plays as a defender for 1. FC Solingen.

He is the son of Eddy Malura.
