= Ferdinand Biwersi =

German football referee

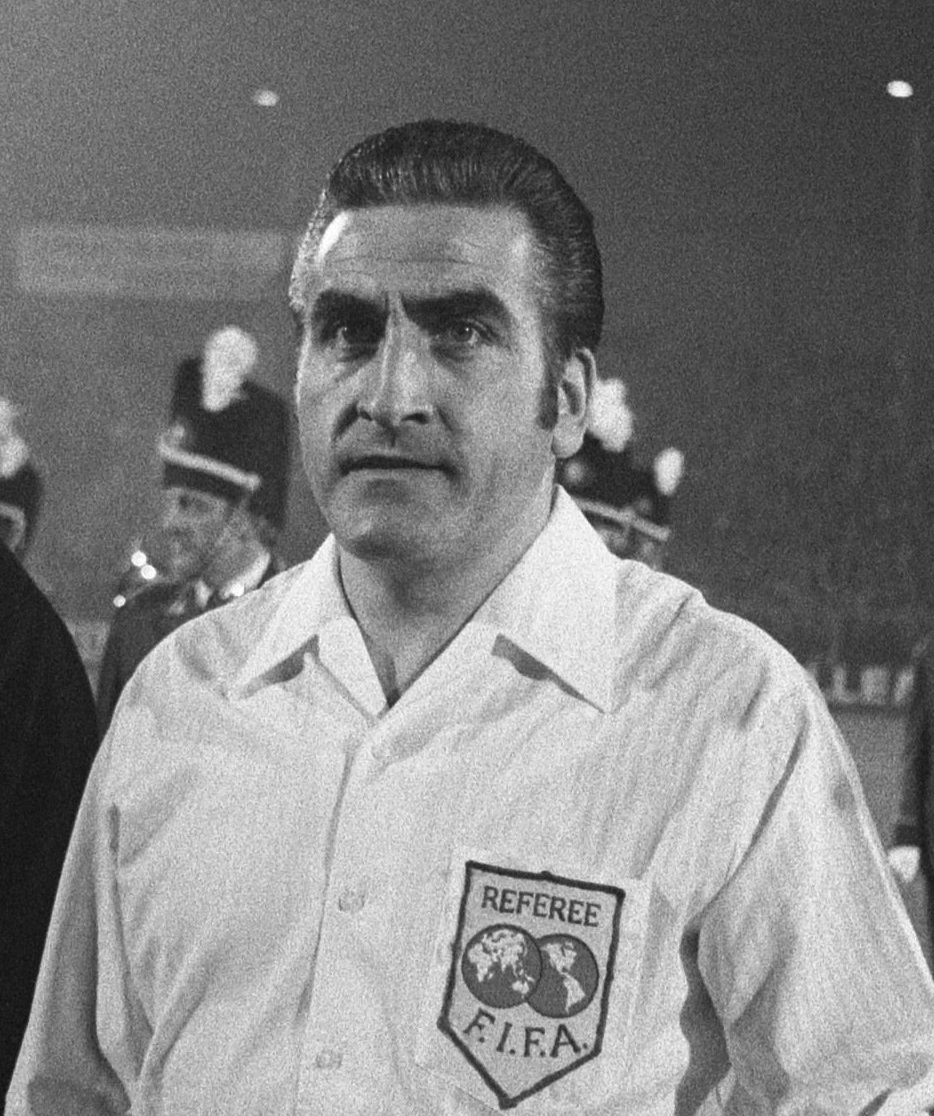
- Full name: Ferdinand Biwersi
- Born: 24 June 1934; Bliesransbach, Territory of the Saar Basin
- Died: 4 September 2013 (aged 79); Mont-roig del Camp, Spain

Domestic
Years	League	Role
1965–1978	Fußball-Bundesliga	Referee

International
Years	League	Role
1969–1978	FIFA	Referee

Ferdinand Biwersi (24 June 1934 – 4 September 2013) was a German football referee.

== Career ==
Biwersi was a referee for the German Football Association in West Germany between 1965 and 1978. He refereed 121 games in the Fußball-Bundesliga, and 27 games in the 2. Fußball-Bundesliga within this time span. One of his last matches was the record Bundesliga victory (Borussia Mönchengladbach 12–0 Borussia Dortmund). Since there were no ball boys in the 1970s, Biwersi had to go and fetch the balls which were shot past Dortmund's goal.

From 1969 until 1978, Biwersi was also a FIFA referee. He was in charge of 16 international matches and 26 European Cup games.

Biwersi refereed the match between the Soviet Union and Sudan during the 1972 Summer Olympics. He was a linesman at the 1974 FIFA World Cup and took charge of one game at the World Cup four years later in Argentina.
