= Bernd Brexendorf =

German footballer and physician (born 1954)

Personal information
- Date of birth: 21 October 1954 (age 72)
- Place of birth: Bremerhaven, West Germany
- Position: Midfielder

Senior career*
Years	Team	Apps	(Gls)
1973–1974	Werder Bremen	11	(0)
1977–1978	OSC Bremerhaven	38	(8)
1978–1979	Westfalia Herne	37	(5)
1979–1981	Holstein Kiel	68	(11)
Total		154	(24)
- * Club domestic league appearances and goals

Bernd Brexendorf (born 21 October 1954) is a German former professional footballer who became a physician. He worked as the club doctor of FC Schalke 04 in the 2007–08 season and 2008–09 season.

== Playing career ==
Already at the age of 18, midfielder Brexendorf was a member of the SV Werder Bremen Bundesliga squad. On 8 September 1973, he made his first appearance in a Bundesliga match. In the home match versus Borussia Mönchengladbach he came in as a substitute with ten minutes to go, Bremen holding a 2–2 draw. He could, however, not prevent Werder losing the match by a Jupp Heynckes goal scored three minutes before the final whistle. In his first season in Bremen he had five more appearances in the Bundesliga, though only in one match (away at 1. FC Köln) he played the full 90 minutes. In his second Bundesliga season he suffered a similar fate; he appeared in five matches, only one of which – away at Bochum – saw him play full-time.

1977–78 he was with OSC Bremerhaven before joining Westfalia Herne. Having played for two more years in the 2. Bundesliga he ended his career as a football player with Holstein Kiel. Altogether he made eleven appearances in the Bundesliga and 140 appearances in the second division, scoring 24 goals.

== Post-playing career ==
Settling in Kiel, he concentrated on his career as a physician, getting his approbation in 1986. At the same time he had received a coaching licence from the DFB and started as a coaching player with VfB Kiel. Since 1993 he worked as a specialist for orthopedic surgery, joint manipulation, osteopathy and sports medicine. In between 1992 and 1994 he also acted as a coach for Holstein Kiel. As from 1994 he worked as a physician in a joint practice in Kiel. Here he treated numerous Bundesliga football players and handball players of top club THW Kiel. On the side, from 1999 to 2001, he coached football team TSV Altenholz.

For the 2007–08 season, FC Schalke 04 hired Brexendorf as successor of Thorsten Rarreck, who had been club doctor for nine years. He left the club in 2009 to take a director's job at a Hamburg clinic.
