= Reinhard Schmitz =

German footballer

Personal information
- Full name: Reinhard Schmitz
- Date of birth: 9 June 1951 (age 75)
- Place of birth: Germany
- Positions: Defender; midfielder

Senior career*
Years	Team	Apps	(Gls)
1973–1974	1. FC Köln	2	(0)
1975–1976	SG Union Solingen	37	(5)
1976–1979	Tennis Borussia Berlin	95	(4)
1979–1981	SC Viktoria 04 Köln	66	(10)
Total		200	(19)
- * Club domestic league appearances and goals

Reinhard Schmitz (born 9 June 1951) is a former professional German footballer.

Schmitz made a total of 28 appearances in the Fußball-Bundesliga for 1. FC Köln and Tennis Borussia Berlin during his playing career.
