= Bernd Erdmann =

German footballer and manager

Personal information
- Full name: Bernd Erdmann
- Date of birth: 23 October 1942 (age 84)
- Place of birth: Berlin, German Reich
- Position: Forward

Youth career
- –1959: Lichterfelder Sport-Union

Senior career*
Years	Team	Apps	(Gls)
1966–1970	Tennis Borussia Berlin		
1972–1974	SpVgg Blau-Weiß 1890 Berlin		

Managerial career
- 1981–1982: Tennis Borussia Berlin
- 1983: SCC Berlin
- 1989–1990: Tennis Borussia Berlin
- * Club domestic league appearances and goals

Bernd Erdmann (born 23 October 1942 in Berlin) is a former German football player and manager.

Erdmann managed Tennis Borussia Berlin and SCC Berlin in the 2. Bundesliga Nord during the 1980s.
