= Jürgen Bucher =

German footballer

Personal information
- Full name: Jürgen Bucher
- Date of birth: 22 March 1957 (age 69)
- Place of birth: West Germany
- Position: Goalkeeper

Senior career*
Years	Team	Apps	(Gls)
1976	1. FC Nürnberg	1	(0)
1978–1980	MTV Ingolstadt	69	(0)
1980–1981	Tennis Borussia Berlin	25	(0)
Total		95	(0)
- * Club domestic league appearances and goals

Jürgen Bucher (born 22 March 1957) is a retired German footballer.

Bucher made a total of 95 2. Bundesliga appearances for 1. FC Nürnberg, MTV Ingolstadt and Tennis Borussia Berlin.
