= Lothar Gans =

German footballer

Personal information
- Date of birth: 17 February 1953
- Position: Defender

Senior career*
Years	Team	Apps	(Gls)
1973–1975	SV Meppen		
1975–1984	VfL Osnabrück		

Managerial career
- Mar–Jun 2000: VfL Osnabrück
- Sep–Nov 2000: VfL Osnabrück
- * Club domestic league appearances and goals

Lothar Gans (born 17 February 1953) is a German former professional footballer who played as a defender.
