= Greg Pahl =

American journalist

Greg Pahl (born January 19, 1946, in Meridan, Connecticut) is a journalist, author and energy activist based in Addison County, VT. Pahl's books and articles generally focus on renewable energy issues. He is a founding member of the Vermont Biofuels Association as well as the Addison County Relocalization Network.

== Early life ==
Pahl was raised in New York City. After graduating high school, he went on to obtain his bachelor's degree from the University of Vermont in 1967. Upon receiving his degree, he later served as a military intelligence officer in Germany for about two years. In 1970, he moved back to Vermont where he worked for a number of small businesses.

== Environment efforts ==
Pahl spent several years living in a wood-heated home powered by a wind turbine. He also heated his house with a biodiesel fuel blend and wood pellets, and installed a solar hot water system on the roof of his garage. Pahl drives a 2007 Toyota Prius.

== Career ==
Pahl began writing for a variety of publications in the late 70s until eventually he landed a full-time job as a freelance writer and journalist. In his writings, he focused on arts, business, finance, farming, wind power, solar energy, electric cars, biodiesel, "green" appliances, home building materials, and sustainable forestry management. He wrote for many publications which include: The Vermont Times, Vermont Magazine, Champlain Business Journal, Vermont History, Middlebury College Magazine, and Mother Earth News.

== Family ==
Pahl is married to his wife Joy and together they live in Weybridge, Vermont.

== Books ==
- Power From The People: How to Organize, Finance, and Launch Local Energy Projects, Chelsea Green Publishing, 2012
- The Citizen-Powered Energy Handbook: Community Solutions to a Global Crisis, Chelsea Green Publishing, 2007, ISBN 978-1-933392-12-7
- Biodiesel: Growing a New Energy Economy, Chelsea Green Publishing, 2005, ISBN 978-1-931498-65-4
- Natural Home Heating: The Complete Guide to Renewable Energy Options, Chelsea Green Publishing, 2003, ISBN 978-1-931498-22-7
- The Complete Idiot's Guide to Saving the Environment, Alpha Books, 2002, ISBN 978-0-02-863982-6
- The Unofficial Guide to Beating Debt, IDG Books, 1999, ISBN 978-0-02-863337-4

== Awards ==
- 2004 Independent Publishers Book Award, Natural Home Heating
- 2013 Atlas Award honoring climate heroes worldwide for his 2012 book, Power from the People: How to Organize, Finance and Launch Local Energy Projects (Chelsea Green).
