= 1. FC Union Solingen =

German football club

- Full name: 1. Fußball Club Union Solingen 1990 e.V.
- Founded: 1990
- Dissolved: 2012
- Ground: Stadion am Hermann-Löns-Weg
- Capacity: 15,000
Home colours	Away colours

1. FC Union Solingen was a German association football club from Solingen, North Rhine-Westphalia.

== History ==
The club was founded in 1990 in the aftermath of the bankruptcy of SG Union Solingen by former members of that club. 1. FC Union Solingen also failed and was dissolved in 2012 with OFC Solingen and BSC Union Solingen emerging as successors.

Both sides lay claim to the tradition of the earliest club named Union Solingen, founded in 1897 out of the merger of a number of clubs from the district of Ohligs in Solingen. Over time these would include Ohligs FC 06, VfR Ohligs, Walder Ballspielverein, and BV Adler Ohligs. Of these clubs, only VfR Ohligs would distinguish itself with any time spent in first division football when they played the 1940–41 season in the Gauliga Niederrhein before being relegated after a last place result.

== Former coaches ==
- Frank Zilles (2007–2009)
- Harald Becker (2007)
- Eddy Malura (2006–2007)
- Sven Demandt (2003–2006)
- Bernd Klotz (2002–2003)
- Olaf Rosenthal (2000–2002)
- Gerd Zewe (1999–2000)

== Former players ==
- Dennis Malura
- Babacar N'Diaye

== Honours ==
- Verbandsliga Niederrhein
  - Champions: 1994, 2002
- Landesliga Niederrhein
  - Champions: 2000
