= Henry Pahl House =

Historic house in Iowa, United States

- U.S. National Register of Historic Places
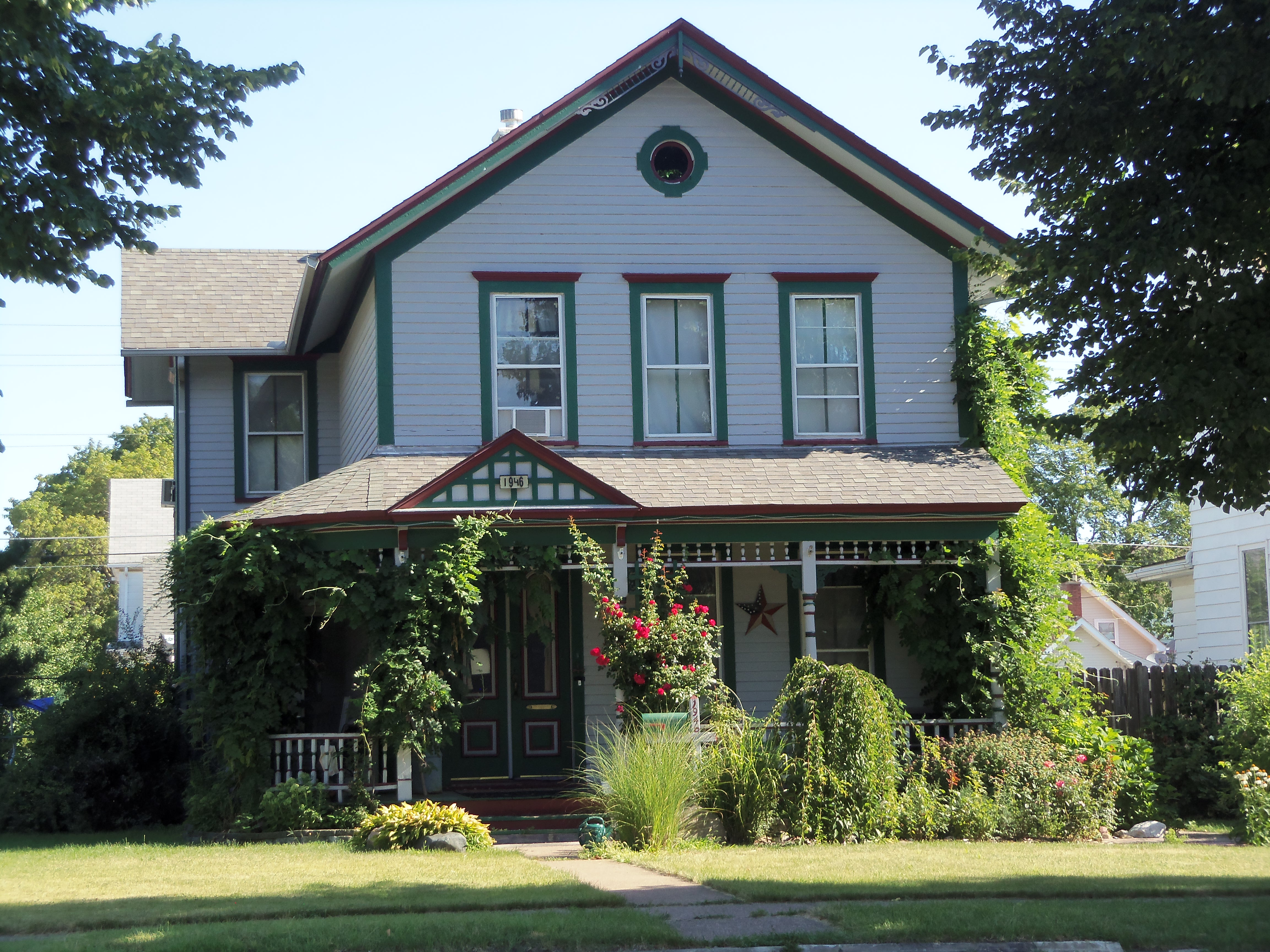

- Location within Iowa Location within the United States
- Location: 1946 W. 3rd St. Davenport, Iowa
- Coordinates: 41°31′21″N 90°36′25″W
- Area: Less than one acre (0.40 ha)
- Built: 1880
- Architectural style: Greek Revival
- MPS: Davenport MRA
- NRHP reference No.: 83002480
- Added to NRHP: July 7, 1983

The Henry Pahl House is a historic building located in the West End of Davenport, Iowa, United States. Henry Pahl was the manager of Phoenix Mills, a local flour milling operation. He was an early occupant of this house, which is a typical Greek Revival style residence found in Davenport in the late 19th century. Its original features include the oculus found in the gable end, the molded window heads, and the double-leaf door with the recessed round-arch panels. The porch, which wraps around the front and west sides of the house, in not original to the structure. It has been listed on the National Register of Historic Places since 1983.
