= Kate Pahl =

Kate Heron Pahl (born 1962) is Professor of Literacies and Head of Education and Social Research Institute at Manchester Metropolitan University. Her work draws on arts and humanities methodologies to co-produce knowledge with community partners and the intersections between arts methodologies and community cohesion. Her publications have drawn on literary theory, New Literacy Studies and social anthropology.

== Books ==
- Pahl, Kate (1999). Transformations: Children's Meaning Making in a Nursery. Trentham Books. ISBN 9781858560984.
- Pahl, Kate; Rowsell, Jennifer (2005). Literacy and Education: Understanding the New Literacy Studies in the Classroom. Paul Chapman Publishing. ISBN 9781412901130.
- Pahl, Kate; Rowsell, Jennifer (2010). Artifactual Literacies: Every Object Tells a Story. Teachers College Press. ISBN 9780807751329.
- Grenfell, Michael; Bloome, David; Hardy, Cheryl; Pahl, Kate; Rowsell, Jennifer; Street, Brian (2012). Bourdieu, Language-Based Ethnographies and Reflexivity. Routledge. ISBN 9780415872492.
- Pahl, Kate (2014). Materializing literacies in communities: The uses of literacy revisited. Bloomsbury. ISBN 9780567469618.
