= Edmund Kaczor =

German footballer (1952–2022)

- Kaczor in 1975

Personal information
- Date of birth: 24 December 1956
- Place of birth: Hamm, North Rhine-Westphalia, West Germany
- Date of death: 30 August 2024 (aged 67)
- Place of death: Vienna, Austria
- Positions: Forward; midfielder

Senior career*
Years	Team	Apps	(Gls)
1975	Bayern Munich	1	(0)
1975–1979	Preußen Münster	80	(20)
1980	MSV Duisburg	5	(0)
1980–1981	Rot-Weiß Oberhausen	21	(5)
1981–1983	Linzer ASK	60	(24)
- * Club domestic league appearances and goals

Edmund Kaczor (24 December 1956 – 30 August 2024) was a German professional footballer who played as a forward and as a midfielder for Preußen Münster, Rot-Weiß Oberhausen and Linzer ASK throughout the late 1970s and early 1980s. He is also the younger brother of fellow football forward Josef Kaczor and briefly played for Bayern Munich.

== Career ==
Kaczor began his career as a member of the professional squad of Bayern Munich for their 1975–76 season. Although Kaczor left Bayern Munich in October 1975 and did not play a match domestically, he did play in the 1975–76 European Cup in the second leg of the 1st round against Luxembourger club Jeunesse Esch, which was won 3–1 at the Olympiastadion. He soon moved to play Preußen Münster in October 1975 for the 1975–76 2. Bundesliga and would play for the club until 30 November 1979 and moved back to the Bundesliga with MSV Duisburg at the beginning of the second half of the 1979–80 Bundesliga. He made his debut in his senior career in matchday 15 on 22 November 1975 in a 4–0 home win against Alemannia Aachen. He scored his first goal in the 21st matchday on 24 January 1976 in a 2–1 win in the away game against Spandauer SV. In his first season, he made 24 appearances and scored six goals with his final record for the Münster team totaling 88 games and 20 goals as well as three games and one goal in the DFB-Pokal. In the Bundesliga, he played his first of only five games on 19 January 1980 in matchday 18 in a 2–0 defeat in the away game against VfB Stuttgart. For the 1980–81 2. Bundesliga, he was part of the squad of the Rot-Weiß Oberhausen, for whom he also played twice in the DFB-Pokal with one goal. Following that, he would play abroad in Austria for Linzer ASK from 1981–82 Austrian Football Bundesliga to the 1982–83 Austrian Football Bundesliga, playing in 60 out of 66 league matches and scoring 24 goals.
