= Heikko Glöde =

German footballer and manager

Personal information
- Full name: Heikko Glöde
- Date of birth: 12 July 1961 (age 65)
- Place of birth: West Berlin, West Germany
- Height: 1.83 m (6 ft 0 in)
- Positions: Midfielder; striker

Youth career
- Hertha BSC
- CFC Hertha 06
- SC Staaken
- –1980: Tennis Borussia Berlin

Senior career*
Years	Team	Apps	(Gls)
1980–1981	Tennis Borussia Berlin	21	(3)
1981–1982	SCC Berlin		
1982–1986	Hertha BSC	119	(31)
1986–1990	VfL Osnabrück	146	(55)
1990–1992	1. FC Saarbrücken	37	(3)
1992–1993	FC Remscheid	13	(0)
Total		336	(92)

Managerial career
- 1995–2001: Hertha BSC (youth team)
- 2001–2004: VfL Wolfsburg (youth team)
- * Club domestic league appearances and goals

Heikko Glöde (born 12 July 1961 in West Berlin) is a retired German football manager and former player.

Glöde made a total of 11 Bundesliga appearances for Hertha BSC and played in a further 325 2. Bundesliga games for a number of different clubs during his playing career.
