= Momir Karadžić =

Serbian footballer

Personal information
- Full name: Momir Karadžić
- Date of birth: 16 July 1952 (age 74)
- Place of birth: SFR Yugoslavia
- Position: Midfielder

Senior career*
Years	Team	Apps	(Gls)
1974–1975	Rad	24	(3)
1975	OFK Titograd	1	(0)
1975–1976	Heerenveen	20	(3)
1976–1977	RMHK Kosovo	16	(0)
1977	Trepča	4	(0)
1977–1978	Heerenveen	11	(0)
1978–1979	Liria Prizren	3	(0)
1979	San Diego Sockers	0	(0)
1979–1983	TeBe Berlin	53	(4)
- * Club domestic league appearances and goals

Momir Karadžić (Serbian: Момир Караџић; born 16 July 1952) is a Serbian retired footballer.

Karadžić made 53 appearances in the 2. Fußball-Bundesliga for Tennis Borussia Berlin during his playing career, scoring four goals.
