= Andreas Hinze =

German footballer

Personal information
- Full name: Andreas Hinze
- Date of birth: 26 October 1959 (age 66)
- Place of birth: Germany
- Position: Midfielder

Senior career*
Years	Team	Apps	(Gls)
1980–1981	Tennis Borussia Berlin	13	(0)
Total		13	(0)
- * Club domestic league appearances and goals

Andreas Hinze (born 26 October 1959) is a former German footballer.

Hinze made 13 appearances for Tennis Borussia Berlin in the 2. Fußball-Bundesliga during his playing career.
