= Michael Müller (footballer, born 1944) =

German footballer

Personal information
- Date of birth: 28 October 1944 (age 82)
- Place of birth: Germany
- Position: Midfielder

Senior career*
Years	Team	Apps	(Gls)
1964–1980	Wacker 04 Berlin	137	(4)
Total		137	(4)
- * Club domestic league appearances and goals

Michael Müller (born 28 October 1944) is a German former footballer who played as a midfielder.
