= Frank Mischke =

German footballer

Personal information
- Full name: Frank Mischke
- Date of birth: 19 June 1961 (age 65)
- Place of birth: Berlin, Germany
- Height: 1.80 m (5 ft 11 in)
- Position: Midfielder

Youth career
- SC Staaken
- FV Blau-Weiss Spandau

Senior career*
Years	Team	Apps	(Gls)
1981	Tennis Borussia Berlin	15	(0)
1983–1984	SCC Berlin	22	(0)
1988–1991	Hertha BSC	79	(2)
Total		116	(2)
- * Club domestic league appearances and goals

Frank Mischke (born 19 June 1961 in Berlin) is a former professional German footballer.

Mischke made 13 appearances in the Fußball-Bundesliga for Hertha BSC during his playing career.
