= Horst Bertram =

German footballer and manager (1948–2023)

Personal information
- Full name: Horst Bertram
- Date of birth: 16 November 1948
- Place of birth: Münster, West Germany
- Date of death: 27 May 2023 (aged 74)
- Place of death: Dortmund, Germany
- Height: 1.83 m (6 ft 0 in)
- Position: Goalkeeper

Youth career
- –1966: SC Münster 08

Senior career*
Years	Team	Apps	(Gls)
1966–1967	SC Münster 08		(0)
1967–1970	SC Preußen Münster		(0)
1970–1971	Kickers Offenbach	2	(0)
1971–1983	Borussia Dortmund	200	(0)
1983–1984	1. FC Bocholt	0	(0)
Total		202	(0)

Managerial career
- 1983–1984: 1. FC Bocholt (co-manager)
- 1984–1989: SV Hüsten 09
- 1989–1991: SF Oestrich-Iserlohn
- 1991–1993: Hasper SV
- 1993–1998: VfB Schwelm
- * Club domestic league appearances and goals

Horst Bertram (16 November 1948 – 27 May 2023) was a retired German football manager and former player.

Bertram appeared twice for Kickers Offenbach in the Bundesliga before embarking on a 12-year spell at Borussia Dortmund, playing 200 games, 94 of which also coming in the Bundesliga.

Bertram won the DFB Pokal, German FA Cup, with Kickers Offenbach in season 1970/71.
