= Fred Arbinger =

German footballer

Personal information
- Full name: Alfred Arbinger
- Date of birth: 6 June 1957 (age 69)
- Place of birth: Aldersbach, West Germany
- Position: Midfielder

Youth career
- FC Alkofen
- –1976: FC Vilshofen

Senior career*
Years	Team	Apps	(Gls)
1976–1978	FC Bayern Munich II		
1976–1979	FC Bayern Munich	6	(0)
1978–1980	Tennis Borussia Berlin	51	(5)
1980–1982	FC Vilshofen		
1982–1983	FC Alkofen		
1983–1985	SpVgg Plattling		
1985–1986	SpVgg Deggendorf		
1986–1989	FC Aunkirchen		
1989–1990	SpVgg Osterhofen-Altenmarkt		

Managerial career
- 1986–1989: FC Aunkirchen
- 1989–1990: SpVgg Osterhofen-Altenmarkt
- 1990–1991: FC Vilshofen
- 1991–1997: TSV Rotthalmünster
- 1997–1998: 1. FC Passau
- 1999–2001: SV Schalding-Heining
- 2002–2003: DJK-TSV Dietfurt
- 2006–2007: SV Wacker Burghausen
- 2008: SV Bad Füssing
- 2011–2013: SV Bad Füssing
- * Club domestic league appearances and goals

Fred Arbinger (born 6 June 1957) is a former German footballer.

Arbinger was born in Aldersbach. He began his career playing amateur football in his native Bavaria, before being signed by FC Bayern Munich in 1976. He had the misfortune to make his debut in Bayern's record league defeat, a 7–0 home loss against FC Schalke 04. He made nine more appearances in his first season, most notably a substitute appearance in the second leg of the Intercontinental Cup. He didn't play at all the following season, though, and left for Tennis Borussia Berlin in 1978. After two seasons in Berlin he returned to the Bavarian amateur leagues, initially as a player and later as a coach. He served as a youth coach with SV Wacker Burghausen from 2003 to 2007, and had a brief spell as the club's caretaker manager.

== Honours ==
- Intercontinental Cup: 1976
