= Peter Endrulat =

German footballer (born 1954)

Personal information
- Date of birth: 10 August 1954 (age 72)
- Place of birth: Weidenau, West Germany
- Height: 1.80 m (5 ft 11 in)
- Position: Goalkeeper

Youth career
- –1973: VfB 07 Weidenau
- 1973–1974: Schalke 04

Senior career*
Years	Team	Apps	(Gls)
1974	Schalke 04	1	(0)
1975–1976	SpVgg Erkenschwick	3	(0)
1978	Borussia Dortmund	6	(0)
1978–1981	Tennis Borussia Berlin	60	(0)
Total		70	(0)
- * Club domestic league appearances and goals

Peter Endrulat (born 10 August 1954) is a German former professional footballer who played as a goalkeeper.

Endrulat was born in Weidenau. After coming through the ranks of his local team VfB 07 Weidenau as a youth, he moved to Schalke 04 in 1973 and made his Bundesliga debut as a 20-year-old for the Gelsenkirchen-based team in a 1–1 draw at home to Eintracht Frankfurt on 10 December 1974. Having played three times for SpVgg Erkenschwick, he later moved to fellow North Rhine-Westphalian club Borussia Dortmund where he was the second choice goalkeeper to Horst Bertram. When Bertram was injured in 1978, Endrulat had the chance to prove himself between the posts, and played quite well towards the end of the season. However, on the final day of the 1977–78 Bundesliga campaign, having only been told the morning before the game that his contract would not be extended close-season, Borussia Dortmund travelled to the Rheinstadion in Düsseldorf for a match against Borussia Mönchengladbach. By half-time of his sixth game in Dortmund colours, Endrulat had already conceded six goals, and his coach Otto Rehhagel asked him if he would like to be substituted, but he said he had no problem with playing on. Endrulat later concluded however that this had been the wrong decision:

When I think about it today, I realise I should have left the field at half-time. Then, at least, Horst Bertram would have let in six of the goals. I'm absolutely certain of that. Most people forget that I actually saved a lot of shots, at least those which were indeed possible to save.

— Peter Endrulat

After 90 minutes, Borussia Mönchengladbach had put 12 goals past Endrulat for the all-time record Bundesliga victory. This proved to be Endrulat's last game in Germany's top flight as his contract was not extended. He played out the rest of his career for Tennis Borussia Berlin in the 2. Bundesliga Nord, where he made a total of 60 appearances.
