= Hans-Heinrich Pahl =

German footballer and manager

Personal information
- Full name: Hans-Heinrich Pahl
- Date of birth: 27 February 1960 (age 66)
- Place of birth: Gifhorn, West Germany
- Height: 1.78 m (5 ft 10 in)
- Position: Defender

Youth career
- TSV Hillerse

Senior career*
Years	Team	Apps	(Gls)
–1980	MTV Gifhorn		
1980–1987	Eintracht Braunschweig	214	(20)
1987–1992	VfL Wolfsburg		

Managerial career
- TSV Hillerse
- * Club domestic league appearances and goals as of 30 April 2012

Hans-Heinrich "Heiner" Pahl (born 27 February 1960) is a retired German footballer and current manager. He spent four seasons with Eintracht Braunschweig in the Bundesliga, as well as three seasons in the 2. Bundesliga.
