= Peter Kunkel =

German footballer

Personal information
- Date of birth: 10 February 1956 (age 70)
- Place of birth: Essen, West Germany
- Height: 1.81 m (5 ft 11 in)
- Position: Forward

Youth career
- Union Essen-Frintrop

Senior career*
Years	Team	Apps	(Gls)
1978–1988	SG Wattenscheid 09	310	(87)

Managerial career
- 1997–2004: SG Wattenscheid 09 II
- 2004: SG Wattenscheid 09
- 2008–2009: SSVg Velbert 02
- 2011–2013: Rot-Weiß Oberhausen II
- 2011: → Rot-Weiß Oberhausen (caretaker)
- 2011–2014: Rot-Weiß Oberhausen
- 2014–2015: Rot-Weiß Oberhausen II
- * Club domestic league appearances and goals

Peter Kunkel (born 10 February 1956) is a German football manager and former player who played as a forward
