= Thorsten Schlumberger =

German footballer

Personal information
- Date of birth: 29 October 1960 (age 66)
- Place of birth: Hamburg, West Germany
- Height: 1.70 m (5 ft 7 in)
- Position: Striker

Youth career
- Hamburger SV

Senior career*
Years	Team	Apps	(Gls)
1979–1980	Hertha BSC	20	(3)
1981	Tennis Borussia Berlin	19	(4)
1981–1985	SCC Berlin	34	(9)
1985–1986	Hertha BSC	17	(7)
1987–1992	Blau-Weiß 90 Berlin	146	(44)
- BSV Brandenburg
- FSV Velten
- SV Wilhelmshaven
Total		236	(67)
- * Club domestic league appearances and goals

Thorsten Schlumberger (born 29 October 1960 in Hamburg) is a former professional German footballer.

== Career ==
Schlumberger made eight appearances in the Bundesliga and 228 in the 2. Bundesliga during his playing career.
