= Allan Hansen =

Danish footballer (born 1956)

Personal information
- Full name: Allan Hansen
- Date of birth: 21 April 1956 (age 70)
- Place of birth: Odense, Denmark
- Height: 1.72 m (5 ft 7 1/2 in)
- Positions: Attacking midfielder; forward

Youth career
- Dalum

Senior career*
Years	Team	Apps	(Gls)
1974–1977	OB		
1978–1979	Tennis Borussia Berlin	54	(12)
1980–1982	OB	72	(46)
1982–1984	Hamburger SV	20	(4)
1984–1988	OB	101	(28)
1988	Næstved	16	(4)
1989	OKS		
1990–1992	Kværndrup BK		
1992–1994	B.67		

International career
1972	Denmark U17	1	(0)
1972–1973	Denmark U19	7	(4)
1974–1978	Denmark U21	10	(1)
1977–1985	Denmark	16	(3)
- * Club domestic league appearances and goals

Allan Hansen (born 21 April 1956) is a Danish former football player who most notably played professionally for German team Hamburger SV, with whom he won the 1983 Bundesliga and European Cup trophies. He played 16 matches and scored three goals for the Denmark national football team, and was named 1977 and 1981 Danish Player of the Year.

== Honours ==
=== Club ===
- Bundesliga: 1982–83
- European Cup: 1982–83

=== Individual ===
- Danish Player of the Year: 1977, 1981
