= Jochem Ziegert =

German footballer

Personal information
- Full name: Jochem Ziegert
- Date of birth: 25 July 1954 (age 72)
- Place of birth: Marburg, West Germany
- Height: 1.90 m (6 ft 3 in)
- Positions: Defender; midfielder

Team information
- Current team: Hertha BSC (youth)

Youth career
- 1961–1975: Sportfreunde Marburg

Senior career*
Years	Team	Apps	(Gls)
1975–1976	KSV Hessen Kassel	30	(7)
1976–1978	KSV Baunatal	67	(7)
1978–1980	Tennis Borussia Berlin	86	(8)
1980–1983	Hertha BSC	23	(0)
Total		206	(22)

Managerial career
- 1986–1992: Hertha BSC (youth)
- 1992–1997: Hertha BSC II
- 1994–1995: Hertha BSC (assistant manager)
- 1998–1999: SV Tasmania-Gropiusstadt 1973
- 2004–2013: Hertha BSC II (assistant manager)
- 2009: Hertha BSC II (interim manager)
- 2013–: Hertha BSC (youth)
- * Club domestic league appearances and goals

Jochem Ziegert (born 25 July 1954 in Marburg) is a former German footballer.

Ziegert made a total of 176 appearances in the 2. Fußball-Bundesliga during his playing career. As a manager, Ziegert coached Hertha BSC II to the final of the 1992–93 DFB-Pokal.
