= Mommsenstadion =

Multi-purpose stadium in Berlin, Germany

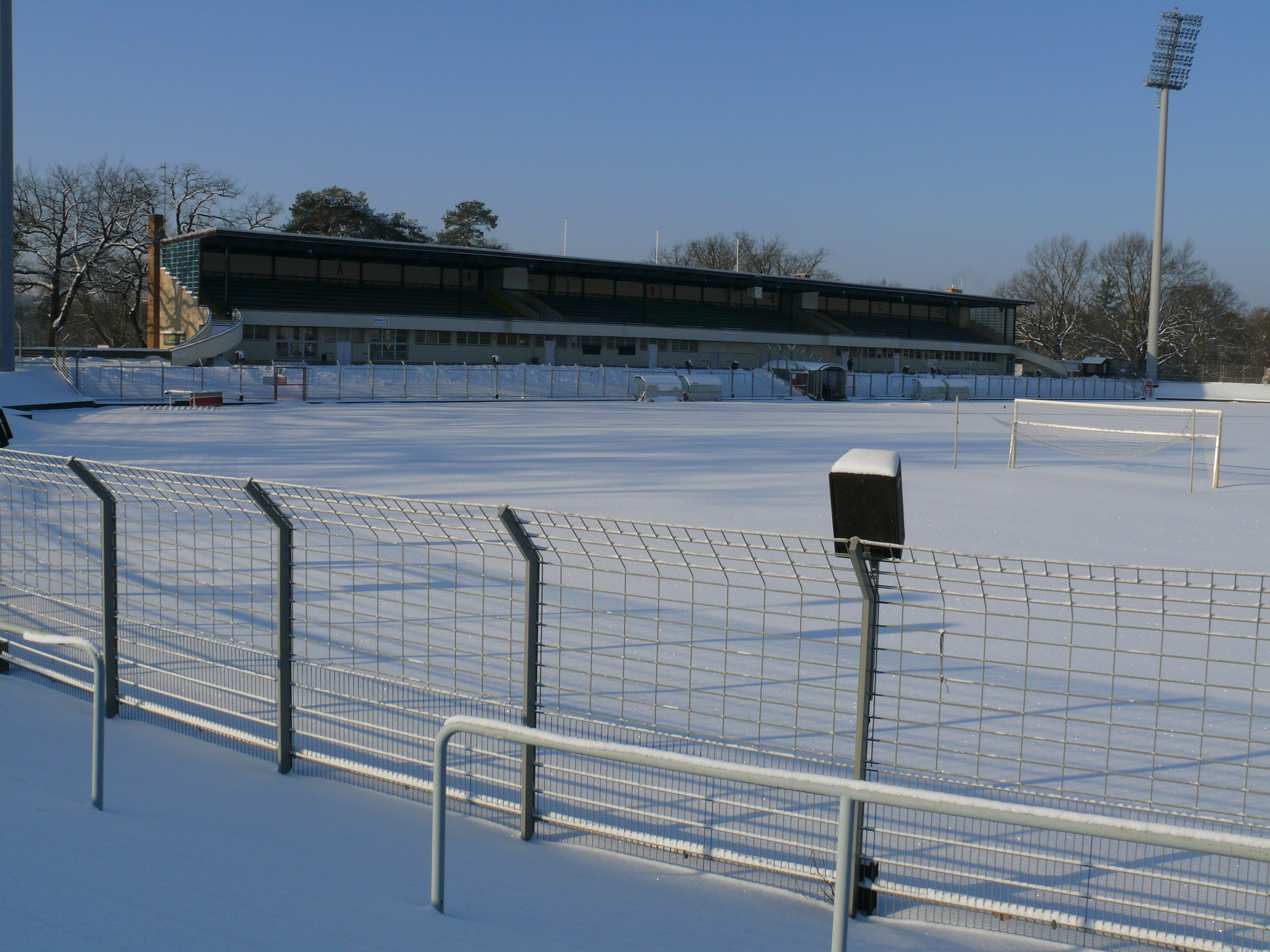
- The Mommsenstadion in winter
- Interactive map of Mommsenstadion
- Location: Westend, Charlottenburg-Wilmersdorf, Berlin, Germany
- Coordinates: 52°30′3″N 13°15′51″E
- Owner: State of Berlin
- Operator: SCC Berlin
- Capacity: 15,005
- Surface: Grass
- Scoreboard: Electronic (since 2000)
- Field size: 107 × 72 m

Construction
- Opened: 17 August 1930
- Renovated: 1950–1956, 2024
- Expanded: 1987
- Architect: Fred Forbát

Tenants
- Tennis Borussia Berlin; SCC Berlin; Berlin Rebels

The Mommsenstadion is a multi-purpose stadium in the locality of Westend in Berlin, Germany, named after the historian Theodor Mommsen. It is currently used mostly for football and hosts the home matches of Tennis Borussia Berlin and SCC Berlin. The stadium has a capacity of 15,005 people (13,200 standing), although the DFB has set an upper limit of 11,500 supporters for football games.

The stadium opened on 17 August 1930 and replaced the former ground of SCC Berlin that fell prey to the extension of the neighbouring Messe Berlin fairgrounds. It soon adopted its name from a nearby gymnasium. The Mommsenstadion was the site of some football matches during the 1936 Summer Olympics and several ISTAF athletics meetings of the IAAF Golden League. Since 1945, it has also been the home ground of Tennis Borussia Berlin.

During the 2006 FIFA World Cup, the Germany national football team used the Mommsenstadion as their training ground. Austria's national football team used the stadium as their training ground for the 2024 UEFA Euros.

== Matches at the 1936 Summer Olympics ==
Date	Time (CET)	Team #1	Res.	Team #2	Round	Attendance
3 August 1936	17:30	Turkey	0–4	Norway	Round of 16	8,000
5 August 1936	17:30	Austria	3–1	Egypt	Round of 16	6,000
6 August 1936	17:30	Great Britain	2–0	China	Round of 16	8,000
7 August 1936	17:30	Italy	8–0	Japan	Quarter-finals	8,000
