= Stadion am Hermann-Löns-Weg =

German football stadium

- HWL
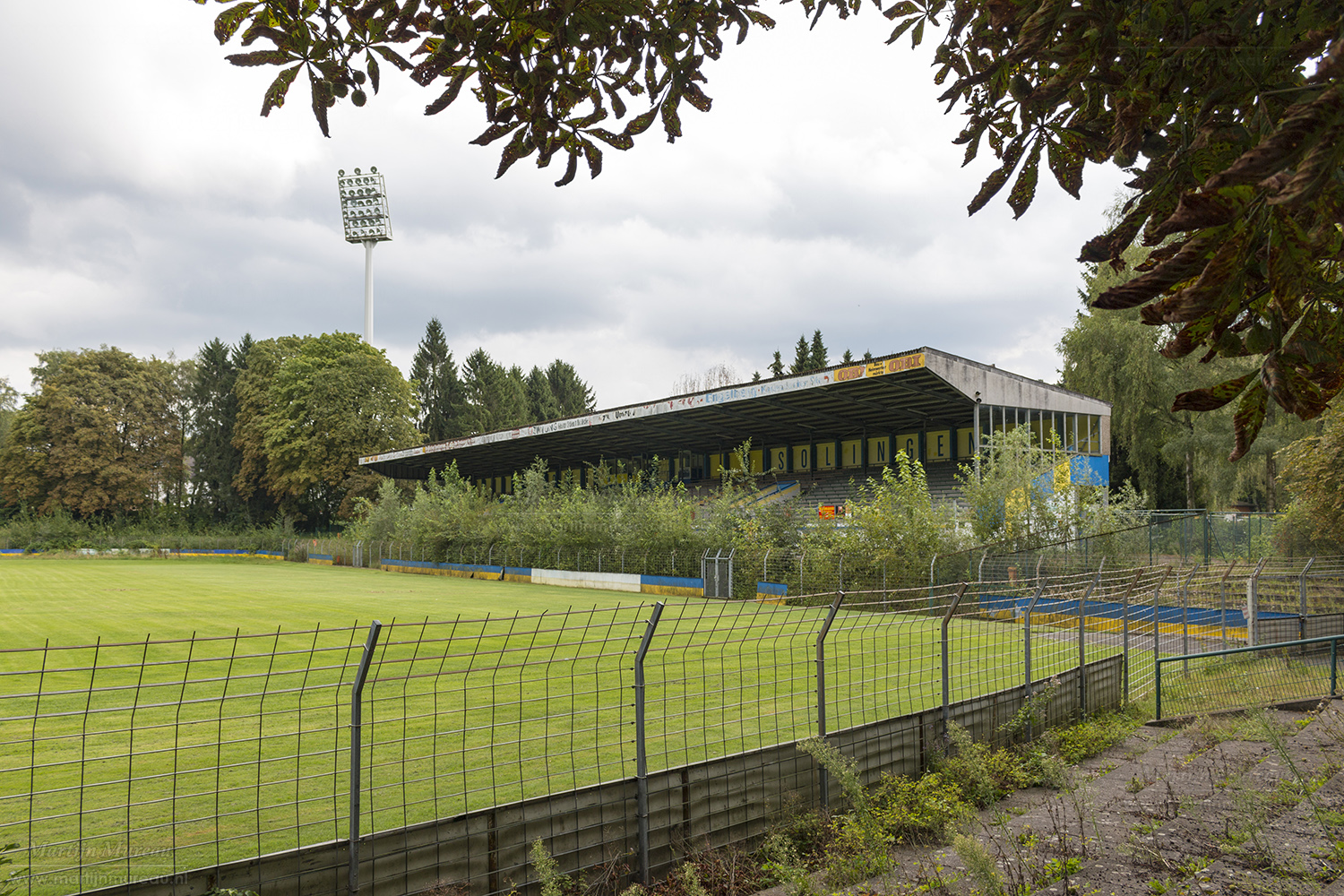
- Interactive map of Stadion am Hermann-Löns-Weg
- Full name: Stadion am Hermann-Löns-Weg
- Location: Naturpark 20; 42697 Solingen; Germany
- Owner: Municipality of Solingen
- Capacity: 18.000
- Surface: Natural grass
- Scoreboard: None

Construction
- Groundbreaking: 1929
- Built: 1929
- Opened: 1929
- Renovated: 1949-1950, 1974, 1976, 1982
- Expanded: 1974, 1976
- Closed: 2010
- Demolished: 2017 (planned)

Tenants
- 1933-1949: VfR Ohligs; 1949-1974: Union Ohligs; 1974: OSC Solingen; 1974-1990: SG Union Solingen; 1990-2010: 1. FC Union Solingen

The Stadion am Hermann-Löns-Weg was a football stadium in Solingen, Germany. The stadium is named after the street Hermann-Löns-Weg en is the former ground of 1. FC Union Solingen. 1. FC Union Solingen dissolved in 2010 after bankruptcy. The stadium was built in 1929 and had a capacity of 18,000 spectators. Since 2010 no football matches are played at the stadium and the municipality of Solingen sold the stadium and its ground to a private contractor. The stadium has been demolished and residential houses are now built upon the former ground.

== Stadium’s history ==
The stadium was built in 1929, after the municipality of Solingen assigned unemployed men to build the stadium. In 1933 VfR Ohligs moved to the stadium. During the 2nd World War the stadium was badly damaged and reconstruction took place in 1949 and 1950. In 1949 VfR Ohligs merged with other clubs to SC Union 06. The renovated stadium was opened in 1950, in front of a crowd of 10,000 spectators. In 1973 SC Union 06 merged with another club into SG Union Solingen.

The new club promoted in 1975 to the 2. Bundesliga, the second tier in German football. During the years the stadium's capacity was expanded to 16,000 and floodlights were installed. In 1985 an estimated crowd of 18,000 to 20,000 people visited the DFB Pokal match against Borussia Mönchengladbach. It appeared however, that the club could not survive financially in the 2. Bundesliga and it had to sell their best players. In 1989 and in 1990 the club relegated twice and went bankrupt. The club managed to pull in investors and renamed to 1. FC Union Solingen. Due to safety reasons, the stadium's capacity was reduced in 2005 to 5,000. In 2010 1. FC Union Solingen went bankrupt and since 2010 no tenant plays at the stadium anymore.

== Stadium’s future ==
The municipality of Solingen sold the grounds and the stadium to a private contractor. The stadium has been demolished as of 2020 and the grounds are now a residential development.
