= Edmund Malura =

German footballer

Eddy Malura
Personal information
- Full name: Edmund Malura
- Date of birth: 24 June 1955 (age 71)
- Place of birth: Germany
- Height: 1.81 m (5 ft 11 in)
- Position: Midfielder

Senior career*
| Years | Team | Apps | (Gls) |
| 1978–1979 | FC Hanau 93 | 30 | (5) |
| 1980–1981 | Tennis Borussia Berlin | 38 | (6) |
| 1983–1984 | SCC Berlin | 34 | (1) |
| 1984–1986 | SG Union Solingen | 75 | (3) |
| 1986–1988 | Rot-Weiß Oberhausen | 69 | (1) |
| Total | | 246 | (16) |

Managerial career
- 2006–2007: 1. FC Union Solingen
- * Club domestic league appearances and goals

Edmund "Eddy" Malura (born 24 June 1955) is a former professional German footballer.

Malura made 246 appearances over a decade in the 2. Fußball-Bundesliga during his playing career.
