= Frank-Michael Marczewski =

German footballer

Personal information
- Full name: Frank-Michael Marczewski
- Date of birth: 30 April 1954 (age 72)
- Place of birth: Berlin, Germany
- Position: Defender

Senior career*
Years	Team	Apps	(Gls)
1975–1976	Spandauer SV	36	(1)
1977	FC Augsburg	12	(0)
1977–1978	OSC Bremerhaven	21	(0)
1978–1981	Tennis Borussia Berlin	102	(6)
1983–1984	SCC Berlin	31	(3)
Total		202	(10)
- * Club domestic league appearances and goals

Frank-Michael Marczewski (born 30 April 1954) is a German former professional footballer who played as a defender.

Marczewski made 202 appearances over a decade in the 2. Bundesliga during his playing career.
