= Peter Vogel (footballer) =

German footballer

Personal information
- Full name: Peter Vogel
- Date of birth: 24 August 1952 (age 74)
- Place of birth: Germany
- Position: Striker

Senior career*
Years	Team	Apps	(Gls)
1977–1978	MSV Duisburg	14	(0)
1978–1981	Tennis Borussia Berlin	67	(7)
Total		81	(7)
- * Club domestic league appearances and goals

Peter Vogel (born 24 August 1952) is a former professional German footballer.

Vogel made a total of 14 appearances in the Fußball-Bundesliga for MSV Duisburg during his playing career.
