= Friedhelm Schütte =

German footballer

Personal information
- Full name: Friedhelm Schütte
- Date of birth: 12 August 1957 (age 69)
- Place of birth: Gelsenkirchen, West Germany
- Position: Midfielder

Youth career
- –1976: FC Schalke 04

Senior career*
Years	Team	Apps	(Gls)
1976–1977	FC Schalke 04	4	(0)
1977–1980	SC Preußen Münster	104	(9)
1980–1981	Tennis Borussia Berlin	41	(1)
1981–1983	SpVgg Bayreuth	64	(12)
1983–1989	1. FC Bocholt		
Total		213	(22)
- * Club domestic league appearances and goals

Friedhelm Schütte (born 12 August 1957) is a former professional German footballer.

Schütte made a total of 4 appearances in the Fußball-Bundesliga and 175 in the 2. Bundesliga during his playing career.
