= Norbert Schmitz =

German footballer

Personal information
- Full name: Norbert Christian Schmitz
- Date of birth: 27 December 1958
- Place of birth: Düren, West Germany
- Date of death: 6 April 1998 (aged 39)
- Place of death: Germany
- Position: Midfielder

Youth career
- 1971–1975: JVC Columbia 1903 Drove
- 1975–1976: Schwarz-Weiß Düren
- 1976–1977: 1. FC Köln

Senior career*
Years	Team	Apps	(Gls)
1977–1978	1. FC Köln	0	(0)
1978–1980	Tennis Borussia Berlin	50	(6)
1980–1984	SC Fortuna Köln	39	(4)
1984–1985	SG Düren 99		
1985–1987	SC Jülich		
1987–1988	FC Düren-Niederau		
Total		89	(10)
- * Club domestic league appearances and goals

Norbert "Nobbi" Christian Schmitz (27 December 1958 – 6 April 1998) was a German footballer who made a total of 89 2. Bundesliga appearances for Tennis Borussia Berlin and SC Fortuna Köln during his professional career.

Schmitz died of cancer at the age of 39.
