= Dieter Hochheimer =

German footballer and manager

Personal information
- Full name: Dieter Hochheimer
- Date of birth: 24 September 1952 (age 74)
- Place of birth: Hattersheim am Main, West Germany
- Positions: Midfielder; striker

Youth career
- –1968: Germania Okriftel
- 1968–1972: Kickers Offenbach

Senior career*
Years	Team	Apps	(Gls)
1972–1974	Hamburger SV	0	(0)
1974–1976	1. SC Göttingen 05	73	(14)
1976–1979	Tennis Borussia Berlin	109	(12)
1980–1982	VfL Osnabrück	93	(6)
Total		275	(32)

International career
1968	Germany U-16	3	(0)

Managerial career
- 1983: Edmonton Eagles
- 1986–1991: California Kickers
- * Club domestic league appearances and goals

Dieter Hochheimer (born 24 September 1952 in Hattersheim am Main) is a former German football player and manager.

== Playing career ==
Hochheimer played three games for the German U-16 in 1968, the year he moved to Kickers Offenbach. He also played a game in the under 19 youth national team in 1970. After four years at the Bieberer Berg, he was signed by Hamburger SV. However, in Hamburg, he was limited to just a handful of cup outings, having not made a league appearance in two seasons. In 1974, Hochheimer moved to 1. SC Göttingen 05 in the 2. Bundesliga-Nord where he made 73 appearances before transferring to Tennis Borussia Berlin. In West Berlin, he played 109 league games, including 17 in the Bundesliga. He played a further 93 games for VfL Osnabrück where he finished his playing career.

== Coaching career ==
After retiring, Hochheimer became the coach of the Edmonton Eagles in the Canadian Professional Soccer League and was head coach of the California Kickers until 1991.
