= Dirk Hupe =

German footballer

Personal information
- Full name: Dirk Hupe
- Date of birth: 29 May 1957 (age 69)
- Place of birth: Solingen, West Germany
- Position: Defender

Youth career
- Solinger SC 95/98

Senior career*
Years	Team	Apps	(Gls)
1974–1981	SG Union Solingen	187	(17)
1981–1985	Arminia Bielefeld	121	(8)
1985–1988	Borussia Dortmund	93	(6)
1988–1994	SC Fortuna Köln	212	(18)
1994–1995	FV Bad Honnef		

International career
1983–1984	Germany Olympic	4	(0)
- * Club domestic league appearances and goals as of 08:11, 10 June 2018 (UTC)

Dirk Hupe (born 29 May 1957) is a retired German footballer who played as a central defender.
