= Wolfgang Schilling (footballer, born 1955) =

German footballer

Personal information
- Full name: Wolfgang Schilling
- Date of birth: 9 June 1955
- Place of birth: Sittensen, Germany
- Date of death: 30 March 2018 (aged 62)
- Positions: Midfielder; striker

Senior career*
Years	Team	Apps	(Gls)
1973–1978	Arminia Bielefeld	165	(17)
1978–1984	Tennis Borussia Berlin	105	(19)
1984–1990	Spandauer SV		
Total		270	(36)
- * Club domestic league appearances and goals

Wolfgang Schilling (9 June 1955 - 30 March 2018) was a professional German footballer.

Schilling made 235 appearances in the 2. Bundesliga during his playing career.

His managing career includes a spell at Berliner AK 07.
