= List of people from Braunschweig =

This is a list of notable people born in, or associated with, the German city of Braunschweig (English: Brunswick).

== Born in Braunschweig ==
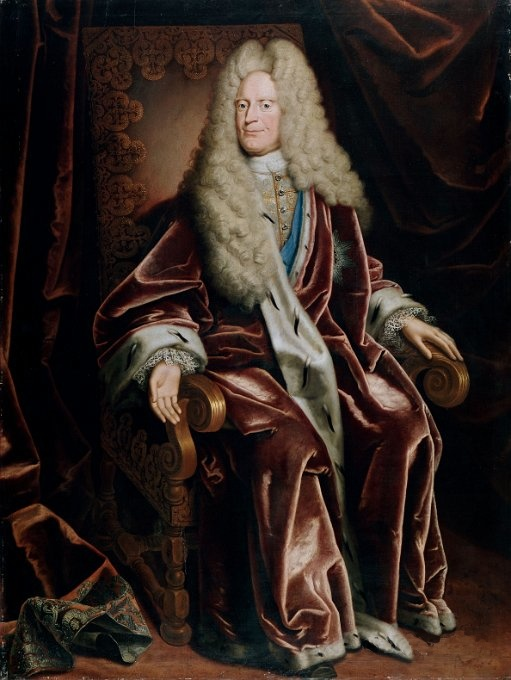
Anthony Ulrich, Duke of Brunswick-Wolfenbüttel

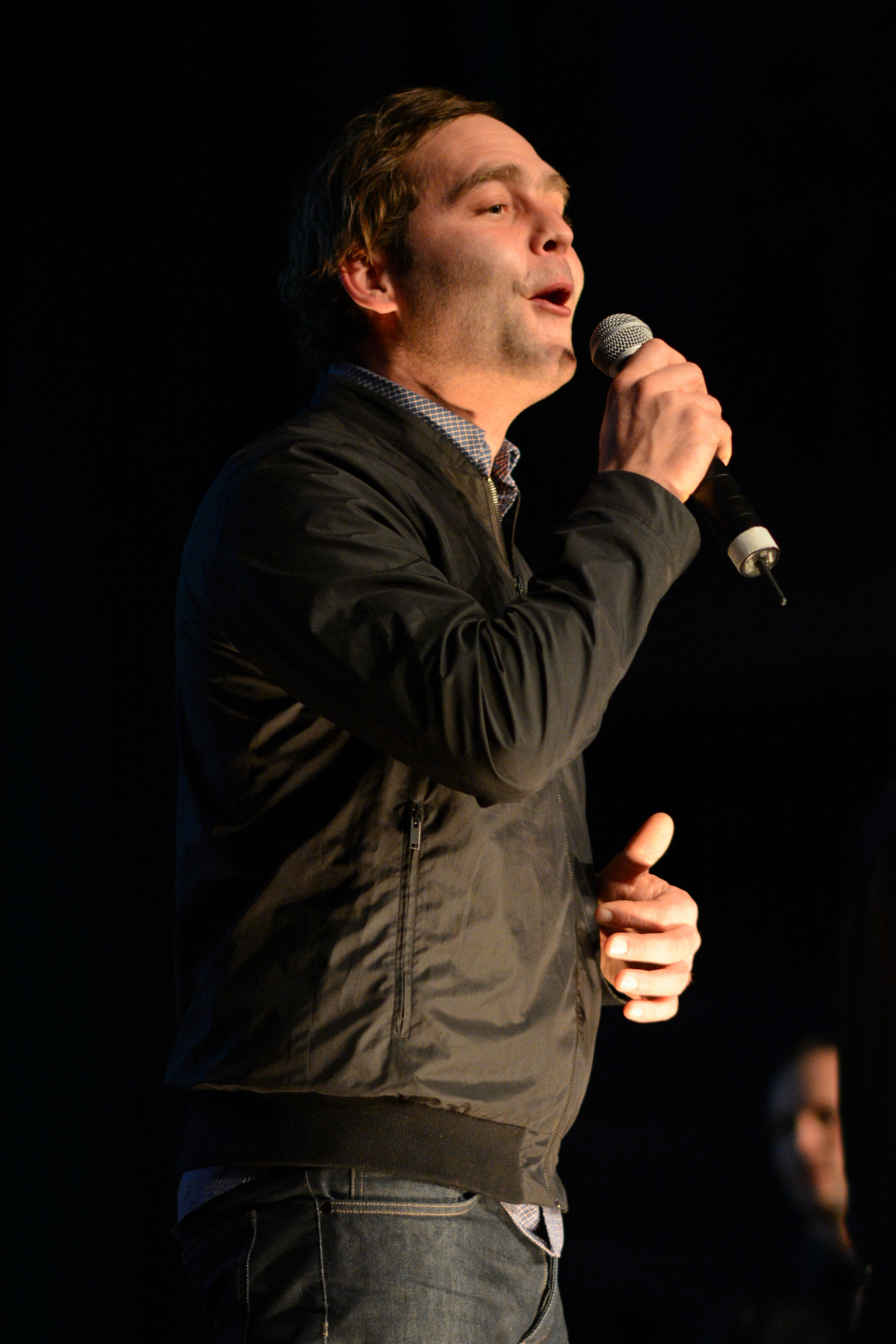
Bosse

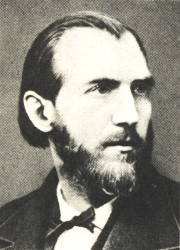
Wilhelm Bracke

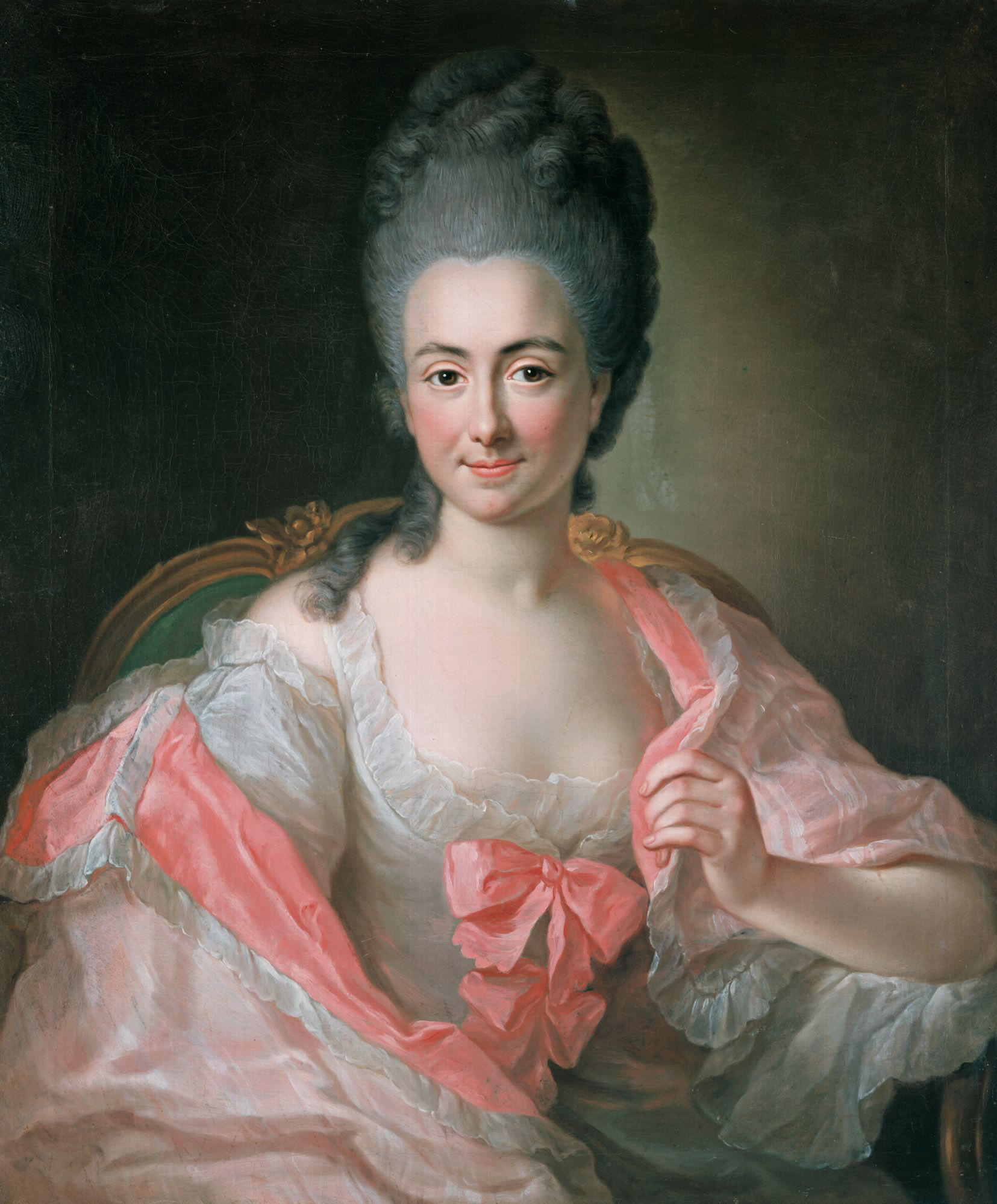
Maria Antonia Branconi

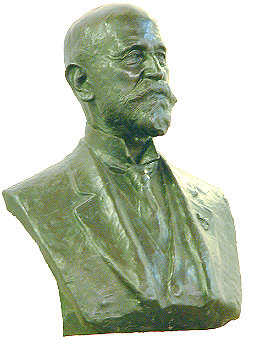
Heinrich Büssing

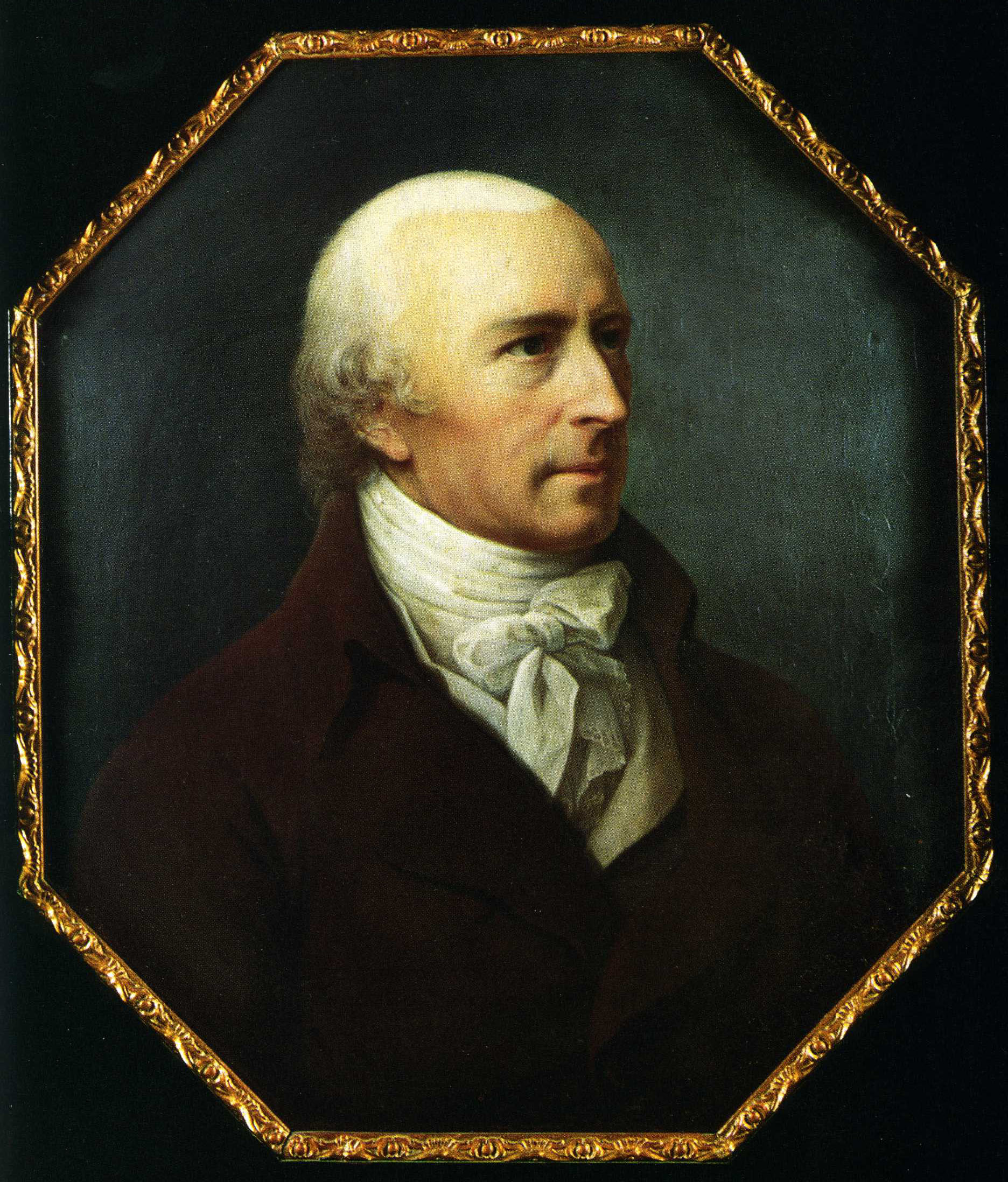
Joachim Heinrich Campe

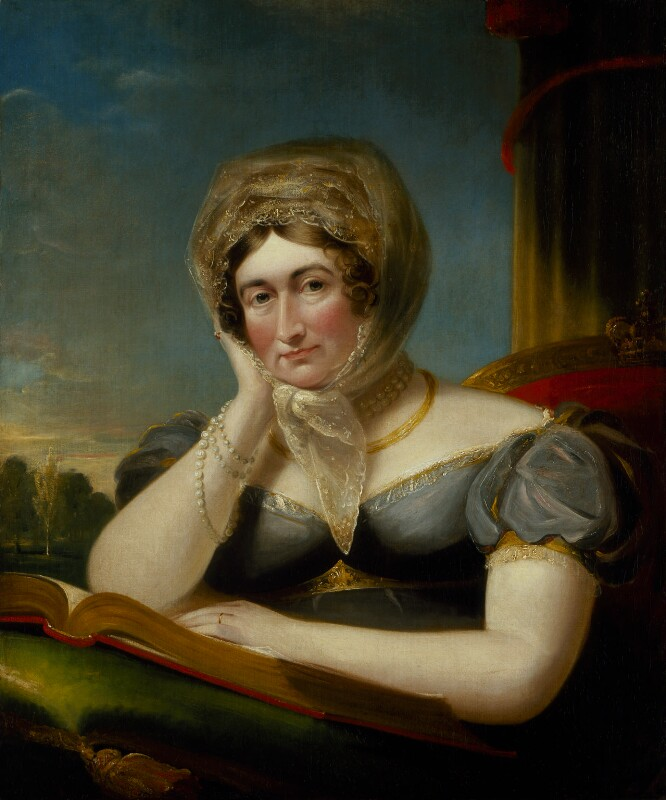
Caroline of Brunswick

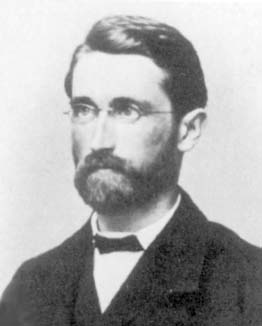
Richard Dedekind

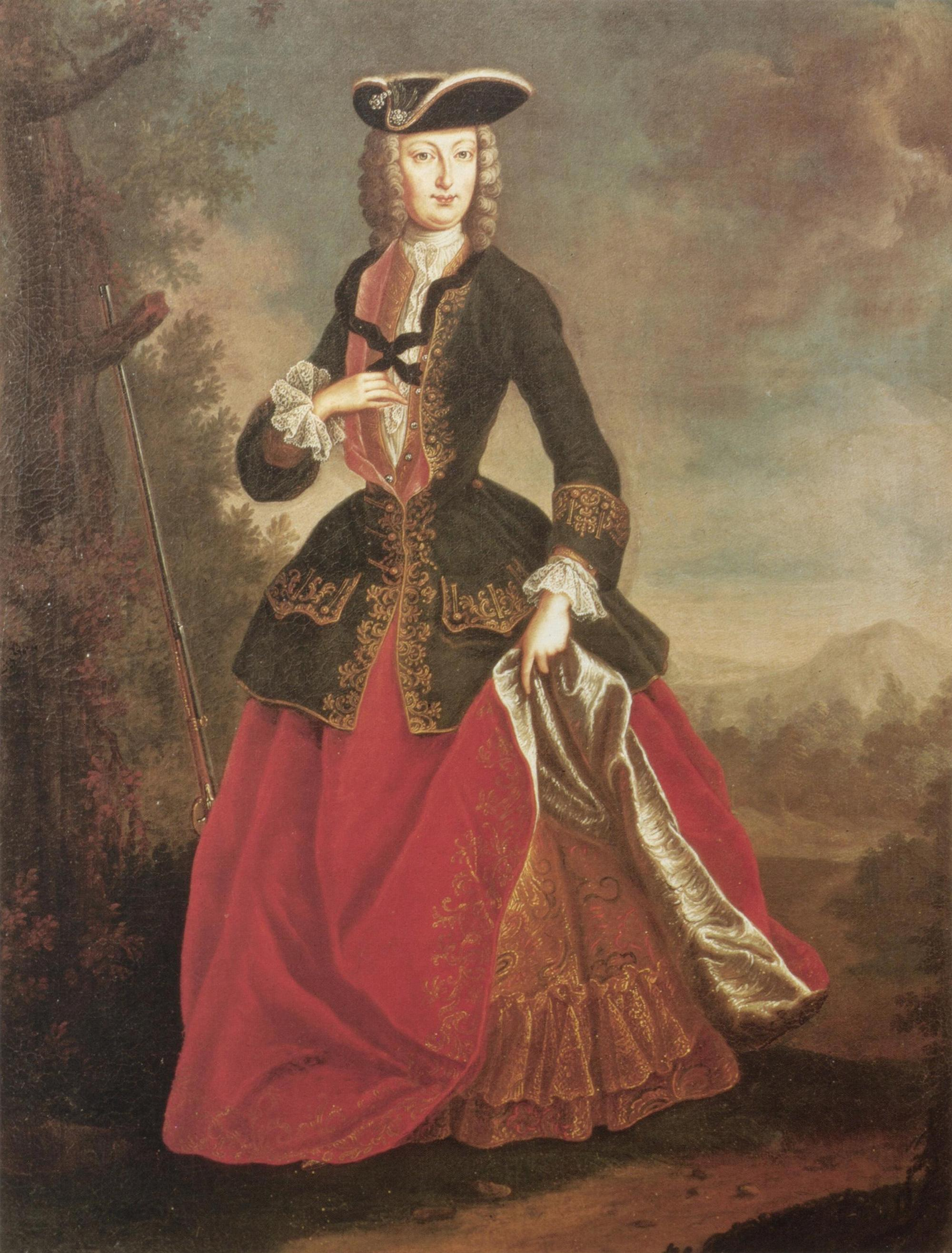
Elisabeth Christine of Brunswick-Wolfenbüttel

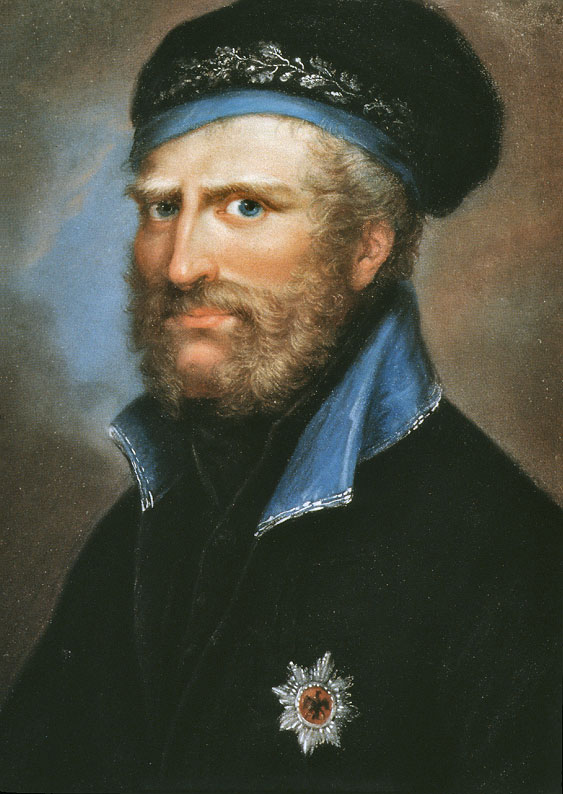
Frederick William

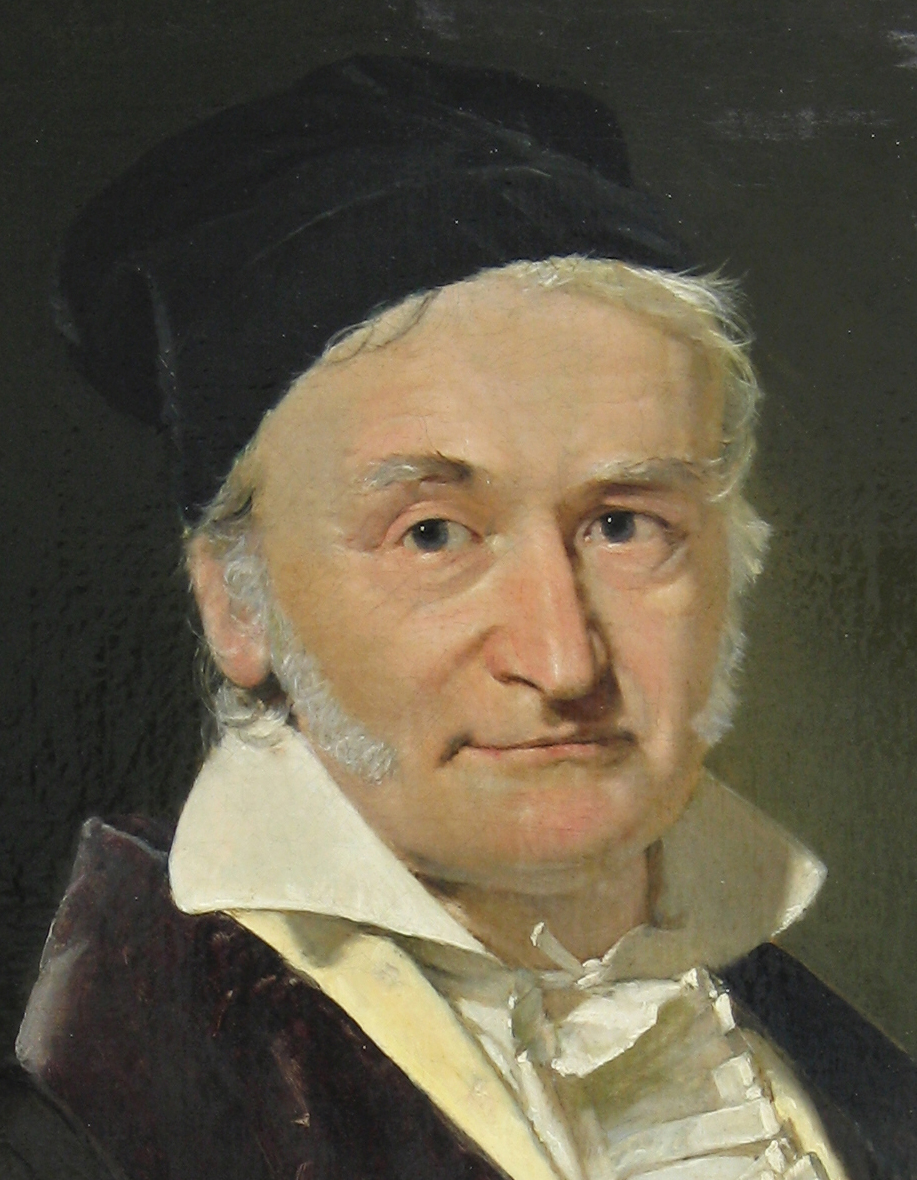
Carl Friedrich Gauss

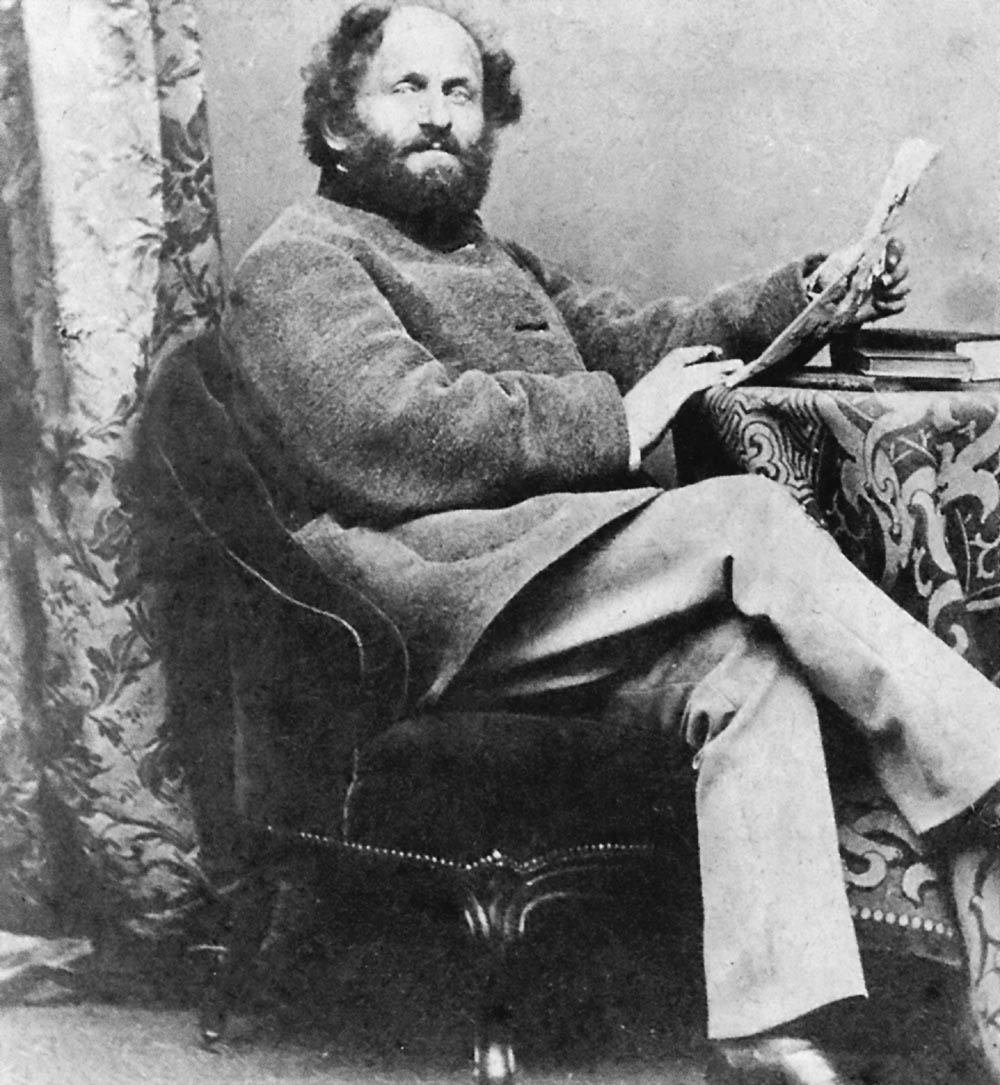
Friedrich Gerstäcker

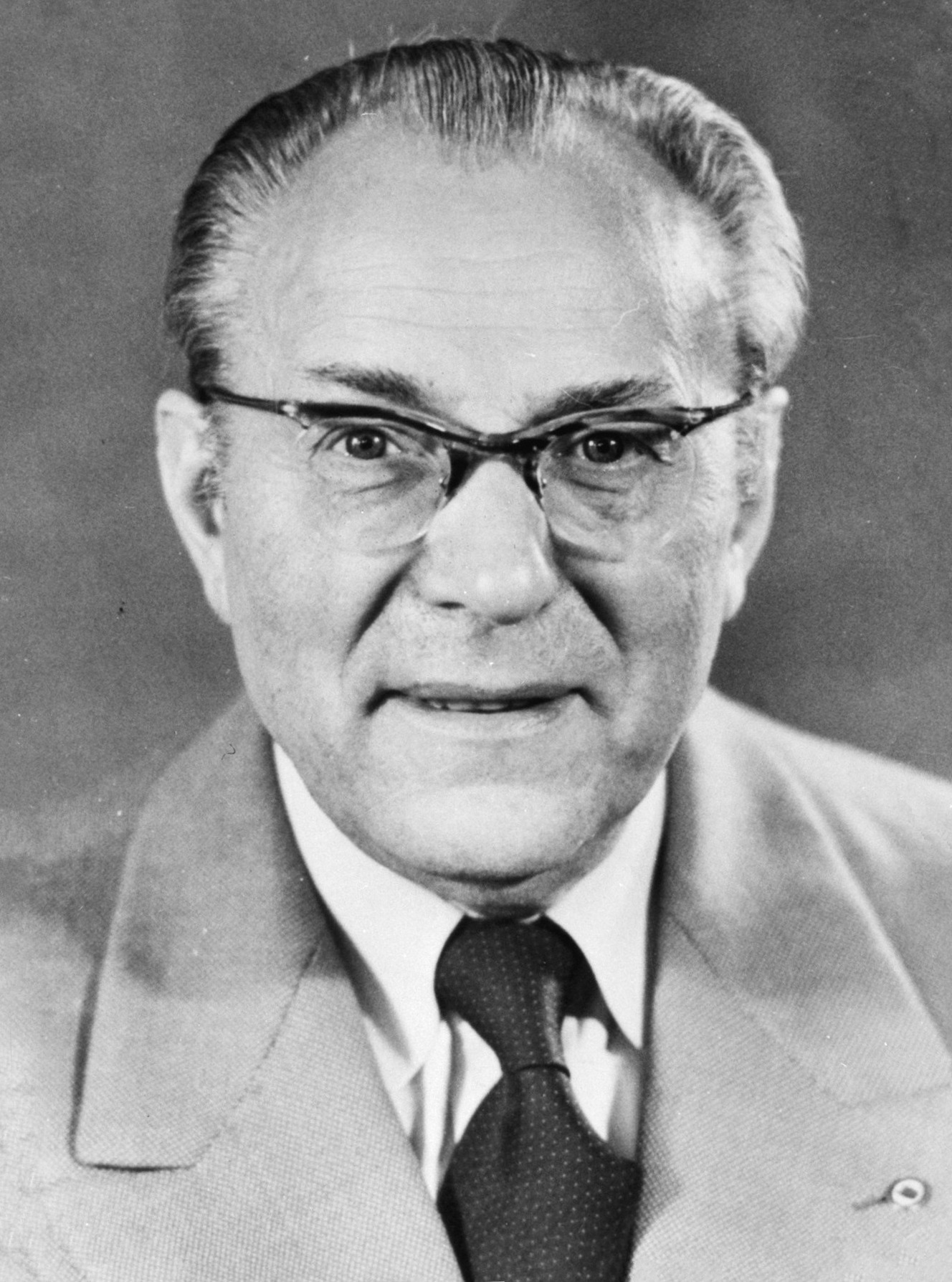
Otto Grotewohl

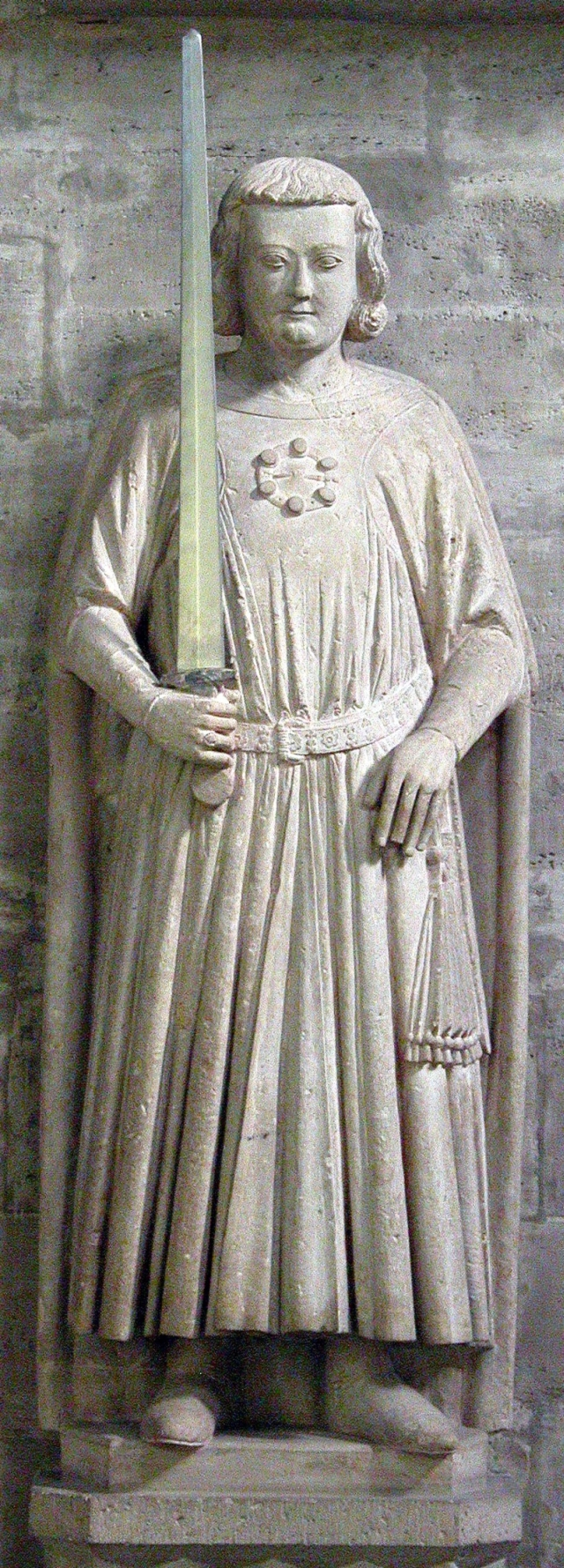
Henry the Lion

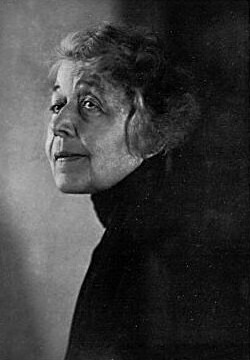
Ricarda Huch

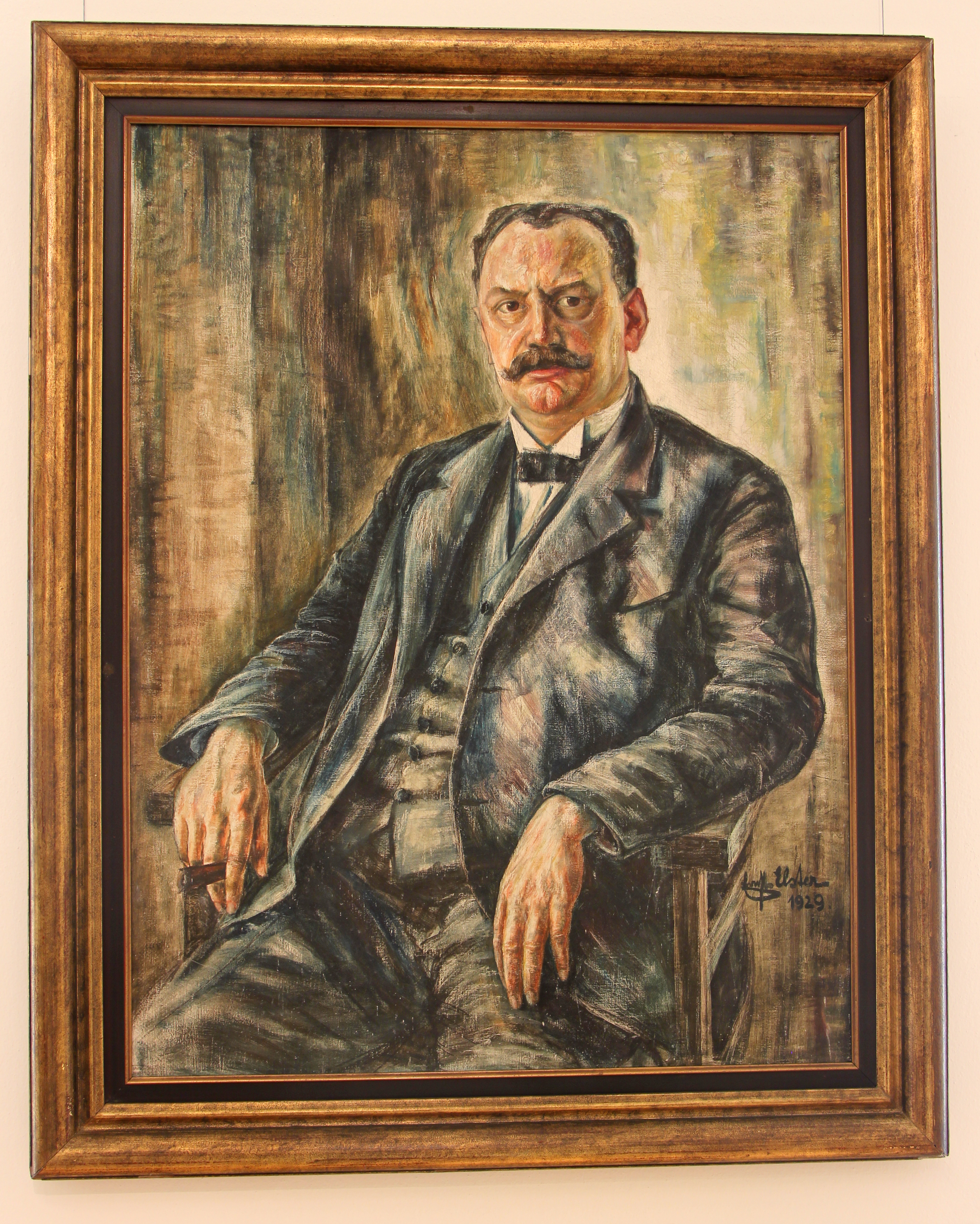
Heinrich Jasper

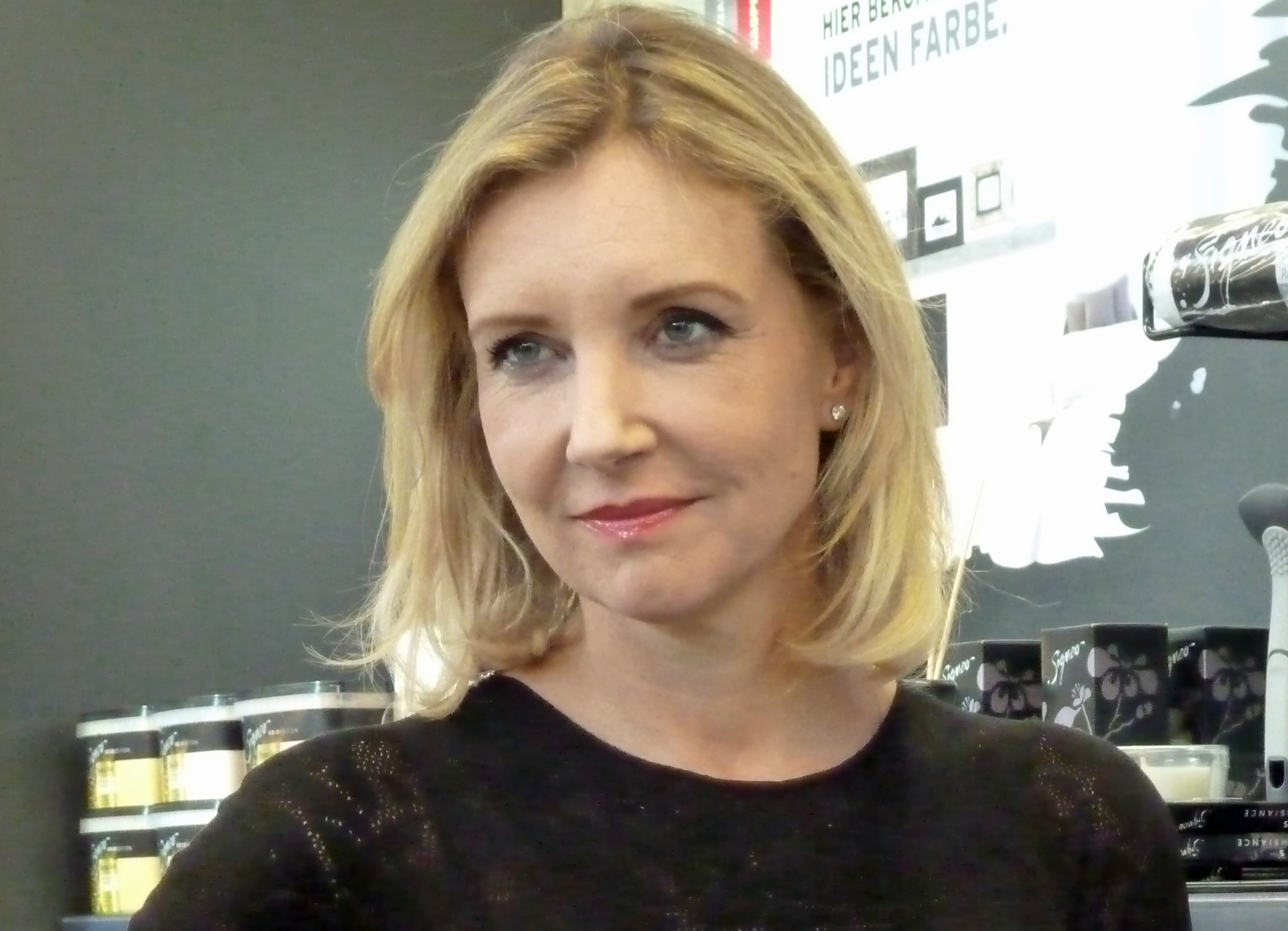
Jette Joop

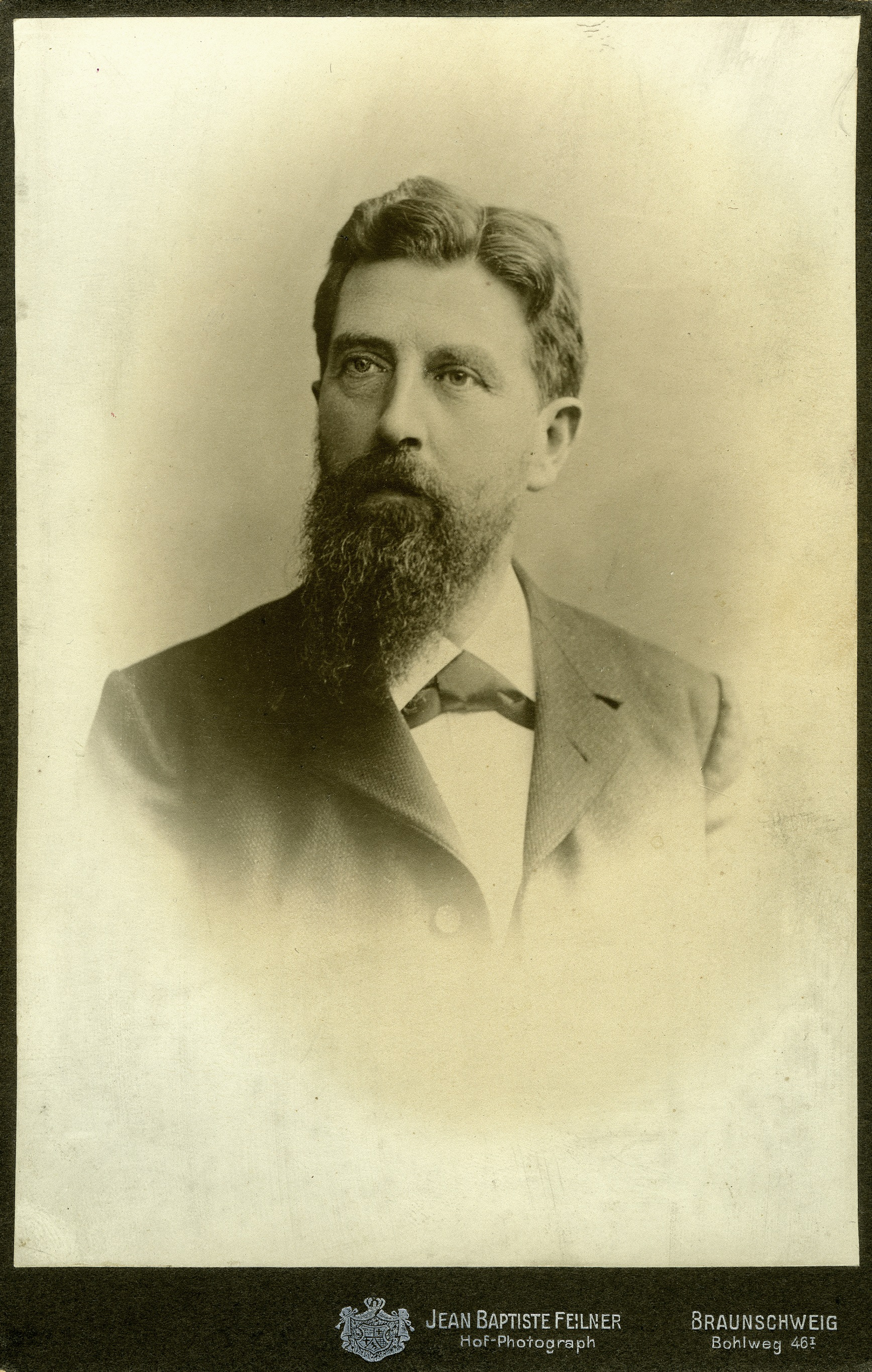
Konrad Koch

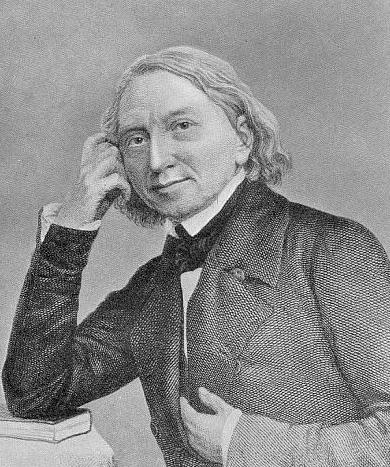
Karl Lachmann

=== A to D ===
- Kurt Ahrens Jr. (born 1940), racing driver
- Karl Andree (1808–1875), geographer
- Richard Andree (1835–1912), geographer
- Augustus William (1715–1781), Duke of Brunswick-Bevern
- Georg Anschütz (1886–1953), psychologist
- Augusta of Brunswick-Wolfenbüttel (1764–1788), Duchess of Brunswick-Wolfenbüttel
- Theodore Bachenheimer (1923–1944), soldier
- Joachim Bäse (1939–2020), German international footballer
- Ewald Banse (1883–1953), geographer
- Cornelius Ludewich Bartels (died 1804), Governor-General of the Dutch Gold Coast
- Johann Christian Martin Bartels (1769–1836), mathematician
- Anton August Beck (1713–1787), engraver
- Bibiana Beglau (born 1971), actress
- Levin August, Count von Bennigsen (1745–1826), general
- Götz Bernau (born 1941), violinist
- Hans Berr (1890–1917), soldier
- Helmut Beumann (1912–1995), historian
- Ingo Beyer von Morgenstern (born 1955), engineer
- Klaus-Dieter Bieler (born 1949), Olympic athlete
- August Wilhelm Heinrich Blasius (1845–1912), ornithologist
- Rudolf Blasius (1842–1907), ornithologist
- Carl Ludwig Blume (1796–1862), botanist
- Oliver Blume (born 1968), manager
- Bettina Blumenberg (born 1962), field hockey player
- Jacob Bobart the Elder (1599–1680), botanist and first head gardener of Oxford Botanic Garden
- Wolfgang Bochow (born 1944), badminton player
- Otto Bock (born 1881), athlete
- Johann Joachim Christoph Bode (1731–1793), translator
- Friedrich Wilhelm Conrad Eduard Bornhardt (1864–1946), geologist
- Bosse (born 1980), rock musician
- Hartmut Bossel (born 1935), environmental scientist
- Hermann Bote (c. 1450–c. 1520), chronicler
- Detlef Bothe (born 1965), actor and film director
- Wilhelm Bracke (1842–1880), one of the founders of the Social Democratic Workers' Party of Germany, predecessor of the Social Democratic Party of Germany.
- Jack Brand (born 1953), Canadian international soccer player
- Walter Bransen (1886–1941), composer
- Wolfgang Brase (born 1939), footballer
- Rudolf Maria Breithaupt (1873–1945), composer
- Ingrid Bruckert (born 1952), field hockey player
- Bernd Buchheister (born 1962), footballer
- Christian Heinrich Bünger (1782–1842), surgeon
- Johann Gottlieb Buhle (1763–1821), philosopher
- Axel Freiherr von dem Bussche-Streithorst (1919–1993), military officer and member of the German resistance.
- Petra Butler (born 1966), Academic
- Caroline of Brunswick (1768–1821), Queen consort of King George IV of the United Kingdom
- Lorenz S. Cederbaum (born 1946), physical chemist
- Charles I (1713–1780), Duke of Brunswick-Wolfenbüttel
- Charles II (1804–1873), Duke of Brunswick
- Alix von Cotta (1842–1931), promoter of women's education
- Stephan Dabbert (born 1958), agricultural economist
- Ewald Daub (1889–1946), cinematographer
- Simson Alexander David (1755–1813), writer
- Georg von der Decken (1836–1898), politician
- Richard Dedekind (1831–1916), mathematician
- Carl Ferdinand Degen (1766–1825), mathematician
- Edward Degener (1809–1890), politician
- Jaro Deppe (born 1948), footballer
- Dirk Dirksen (1937–2006), music promoter
- Werner Ditzinger (1928–2016), swimmer
- DJ Pari (born 1975), musician
- Heinrich Wolfgang Ludwig Dohrn (1838–1913), zoologist
- Wolfgang Dramsch (born 1949), footballer
- Carl Georg Oscar Drude (1852–1933), botanist
- Paul Drude (1863–1906), physicist, developed the Drude model.
- Johann Philipp Du Roi (1741–1785), botanist
- Julius Düker (born 1996), footballer

=== E to H ===
- André Ehrenberg (born 1972), Olympic canoer
- Jochen H.H. Ehrich (born 1946), pediatric doctor
- Justin Eilers (born 1988), footballer
- Jusuf El-Domiaty (born 1990), basketball player
- Elisabeth Christine of Brunswick-Wolfenbüttel (1691–1750), Holy Roman Empress
- Lars Ellmerich (born 1961), footballer
- Otto Engelhardt, (1866-1936), engineer and diplomat
- Christine Enghaus (1815–1910), actress
- Ernest Augustus of Hanover (1914–1987), Prince of Hanover
- Oskar Fehr (1871–1959), ophthalmologist
- Frank E. Fesq (1840–1920), soldier
- Ferdinand Albert I (1636–1687), Duke of Brunswick-Lüneburg
- Karl Fiehler (1895–1969), politician
- Emil Fischer (1838–1914), opera singer
- Florian Floto (born 1988), Olympic archer
- Jacques Goldberg (1861–1934), musician, actor and theatre director.
- Moritz Ludwig Frankenheim (1801–1869), physicist
- Frederick William, Duke of Brunswick-Wolfenbüttel (1771–1815), leader of the Black Brunswickers.
- Ernst Fritz Fürbringer (1900–1988), actor
- Werner Fürbringer (1888–1982), U-boat commander
- Günter Gaus (1929–2004), journalist
- Carl Friedrich Gauss (1777–1855), mathematician
- Hans Friedrich Geitel (1855–1923), physicist
- Johan Georg Geitel (1683–1771), painter
- George William of Hanover (1915–2006), Prince of Hanover
- Gerwin von Hameln (c. 1415–1496), cleric and book collector
- Willy Giesemann (born 1937), German international footballer
- Werner Goeritz (1892–1958), general
- Moritz Göttel (born 1993), footballer
- Karl Heinrich Gräffe (1799–1873), mathematician
- Nico Granatowski (born 1991), footballer
- Johann Ludwig Christian Gravenhorst (1777–1857), entomologist
- Michael Green (born 1972), field hockey player
- Wolfgang Grobe (born 1956), footballer
- Otto Grotewohl (1894–1964), Prime minister of the German Democratic Republic
- Hansadutta Swami (born 1941), guru
- Otto Harder (1892–1956), German international footballer
- Robert Hartig (1839–1901), mycologist
- Albert Heine (1867–1949), actor
- Adolph Henke (1775–1843), physician
- Kurt Heyser (1894–1974), general
- Karl Gustav Himly (1772–1837), surgeon<
- Robert Homburg (1848–1912), politician
- Harry Hoppe (1894–1969), general
- Anton Ludwig Ernst Horn (1774–1848), physician
- Jannes Horn (born 1997), footballer
- August Howaldt (1809–1883), engineer
- Georg Ferdinand Howaldt (1802–1883), sculptor
- Hermann Heinrich Howaldt (1841–1891), sculptor
- Friedrich Huch (1873–1913), writer
- Ricarda Huch (1864–1947), historian and writer
- Rainer Hunold (born 1949), actor
- Conrad Friedrich Hurlebusch (1691–1765), composer

=== I to L ===
- Johann Karl Wilhelm Illiger (1775–1813), zoologist
- Jette Joop (born 1968), fashion designer
- Steffen Jürgens (born 1967), actor
- Henning Kagermann (born 1947), physicist
- Kai Karsten (born 1968), Olympic sprinter
- Katrin Kauschke (born 1971), field hockey player
- Herbert Kirchhoff (1911–1988), art director
- Sascha Kirschstein (born 1980), footballer
- Ernst August Friedrich Klingemann (1777–1831), writer
- Frederik Theodor Kloss (1802–1876), painter
- August Wilhelm Knoch (1742–1818), naturalist
- Robin Knoche (born 1992), footballer
- Gustav Knuth (1901–1987), actor
- Konrad Koch (1846–1911), football pioneer
- Özkan Koçtürk (born 1974), footballer
- Louis Köhler (1820–1886), composer
- Leo von König (1871–1944), painter
- Oliver Koletzki (born 1974), music producer
- Charles Konig (1774–1851), naturalist
- Joachim von Kortzfleisch (1890–1945), general
- Nina Kraft (born 1968), triathlete
- Uwe Krause (born 1955), footballer
- Gerard Krefft (1830–1881), zoologist
- Louis Krevel (1801–1876), painter
- Alfred Kubel (1909–1999), politician, Prime Minister of Lower Saxony
- Wolfgang Kubicki (born 1952), politician
- Christiane Kubrick (born 1932), actress and painter
- Kristina Kühnbaum-Schmidt (born 1964), German lutheran bishop
- Jens Kujawa (born 1965), basketball player
- Karl Lachmann (1793–1851), philologist
- Heike Lätzsch (born 1973), field hockey player
- August Lafontaine (1758–1831), author of sentimental didactic novels once immensely popular, born and brought up in the city
- Christophe Lambert (born 1985), judoka
- Gerhard Landmann (1904–1933), SS man
- Paul Lehmann (1884–1964), palaeographer
- Katharina Lehnert (born 1994), tennis player
- Rudolf Lindau (1888–1977), politician

=== M to P ===
- Thilo Maatsch (1900–1983), artist
- Alexander Madlung (born 1982), German international footballer
- Willy Maertens (1893–1967), actor
- Bertha von Marenholtz-Bülow (1810–1893), noblewoman and educator
- Günter Mast (1927–2011), businessman
- Walter Mattern (1920–1974), SS-Hauptsturmführer
- Heike Matthiesen (born 1969), classical guitarist
- Heinz Mayr (born 1935), Olympic racewalker
- MC Rene (born 1976), rapper
- Rosine Elisabeth Menthe (1663–1701), wife of Rudolph Augustus, Duke of Brunswick-Wolfenbüttel
- Florian Meyer (born 1968), football referee
- Johann Heinrich Meyer (1812–1863), publisher
- Klaus Meyer (1937–2014), footballer
- Hugo Miehe (1875–1932), botanist
- Nils Mittmann (born 1979), basketball player
- Tomo Johannes in der Mühlen (born 1961), DJ and producer
- Gustav von der Mülbe (1831–1917), general
- Müller Brothers, a noted 19th-century string quartet composed of four brothers.
- Günther Müller-Stöckheim (1913–1943), U-boat commander
- Adolph Nehrkorn (1841–1916), ornithologist
- Christian Neidhart (born 1968), footballer and manager
- Marie Neurath (1898–1986), graphic designer
- Friedrich Bernhard Gottfried Nicolai (1793–1846), astronomer
- Walter Nicolai (1873–1947), spy
- Wilhelm Nienstädt (1784–1862), educator
- Carl Theodor Ottmer (1800–1843), architect
- Eva Pagels (born 1954), field hockey player
- Melanie Paschke (born 1970), Olympic sprinter
- Kurd Peters (1914–1957), soldier
- Marc Pfitzner (born 1984), footballer
- Jens Pieper (born 1968), Olympic archer
- Bernhard Plockhorst (1825–1907), painter
- Patrick Posipal (born 1988), footballer

=== Q to T ===
- Walter Ramme (born 1895), Olympic swimmer
- Erik Range (born 1977), YouTube personality
- Fritz Randow (born 1952), rock drummer
- Tobias Rau (born 1981), German international footballer
- Gustav von Rauch (1774–1841), general
- Paul Rehkopf (1872–1949), actor
- Wilhelmine Reichard (1788–1848), balloonist
- Daniel Reiche (born 1988), footballer
- Kurt Reidemeister (1893–1971), mathematician
- Frank Rennicke (born 1964), singer and far-right political activist
- Arnold Rimpau (1856–1936), entrepreneur
- Johannes Runge (1878–1949), Olympic athlete
- Ernst Sagebiel (1892–1970), architect
- Michael Scheike (born 1963), footballer
- Heinz-Günter Scheil (born 1962), footballer
- Galka Scheyer (1889–1945), painter
- Dieter Schidor (1948–1987), actor
- Gudrun Scholz (born 1940), field hockey player
- Eberhard Schrader (1836–1908), orientalist
- Dennis Schröder (born 1993), NBA basketball player, currently with the Sacramento Kings.
- Norbert Schultze (1911–2002), composer
- Christian Schwarzer (born 1969), handball player
- Edda Seippel (1919–1993), actress
- Emil Selenka (1842–1902), zoologist
- Paul Sievert (1895–1988), racewalker
- Hans Sommer (1837–1922), composer and mathematician
- Jan Spoelder (born 1973), footballer
- Louis Spohr (1784–1859), composer
- Alfred Staats (born 1891), Olympic gymnast
- Gustav Steinmann (1856–1929), geologist and paleontologist
- Bartholomaeus Stockmann (c. 1550–1609), composer
- Wenzel Storch (born 1961), film director and producer
- Stephanie Storp (born 1968), Olympic shot putter
- Delphin Strungk (c. 1600–1694), composer and organist
- Nicolaus Adam Strungk (1640–1700), composer and violinist
- Gustav Teichmüller (1832–1888), philosopher
- Mechthildis Thein (1888–1959), actress
- Ulrich Thein (1930–1995), actor
- Phillip Tietz (born 1997), footballer
- Louis Tronnier (1897–1952), general

=== U to Z ===
- Constantin Uhde (1836–1905), architect
- Lette Valeska (1885–1985), artist
- Conrad Varrentrapp (1844–1911), historian
- Hans Waldmann (1922–1945), fighter pilot
- Gerd Wedler (1929–2008), chemist
- Friedrich Georg Weitsch (1758–1828), painter
- Reinhard Wendemuth (born 1948), Olympic rower
- Franz Wenzler (1893–1942), film director
- Christian Rudolph Wilhelm Wiedemann (1770–1840), naturalist
- Arend Friedrich August Wiegmann (1802–1841), zoologist
- Rudolf Wilke (1873–1908), caricaturist
- William of Brunswick (1830–1884), Duke of Brunswick
- Christian Ludewig Theodor Winkelmann (1812–1875), piano maker
- Hermann Winkelmann (1849–1912), Heldentenor
- Frederick Albert Winsor (1763–1830), inventor
- Franz Winter (1861–1930), archaeologist
- Ludwig Winter (1843–1930), architect
- Nils Wogram (born 1972), musician
- Adolf Wolf (1899–1973), general
- Johann Zanger (1557–1607), legal scholar
- H. Dieter Zeh (born 1932), physicist
- Michael Zickerick (born 1948), diplomat
- Albrecht Zimmermann (1860–1931), botanist
- Johann Leopold Theodor Friedrich Zincken (1770–1856), entomologist

== Lived in, or associated with, Braunschweig ==
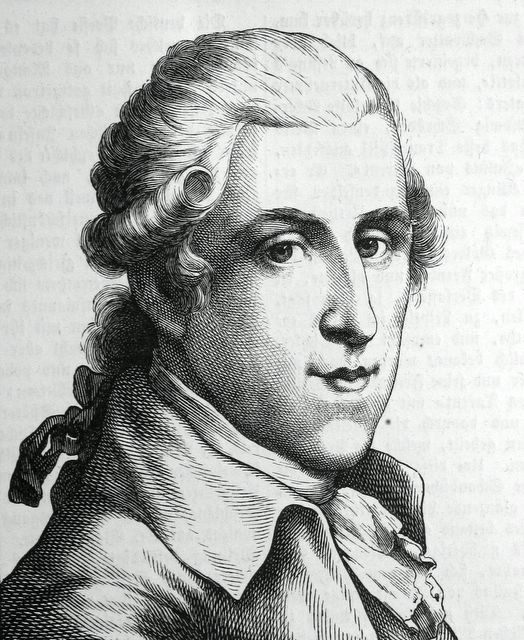
Johann Anton Leisewitz

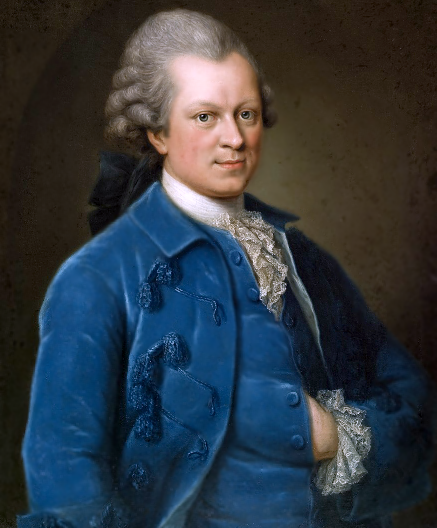
Gotthold Ephraim Lessing

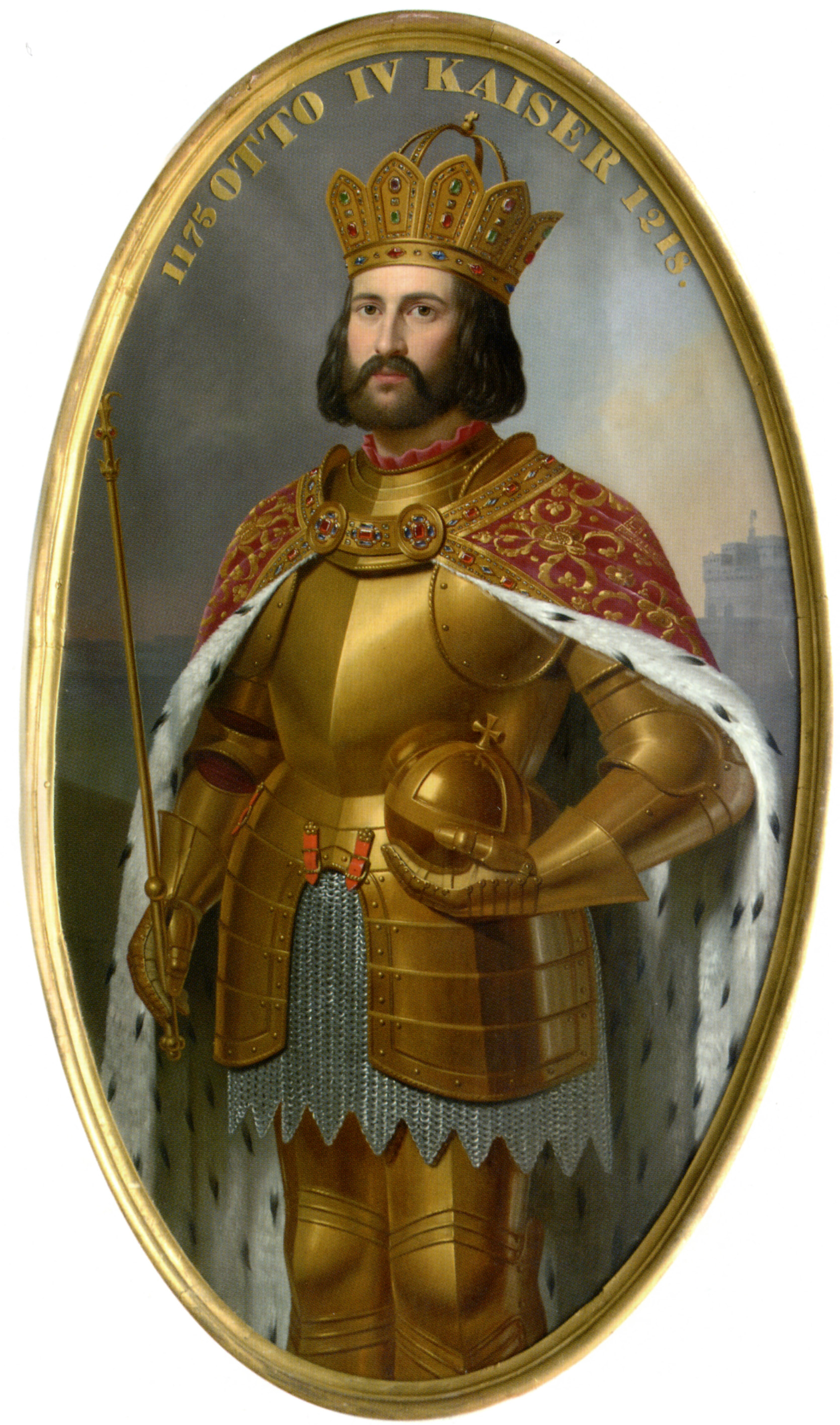
Otto IV

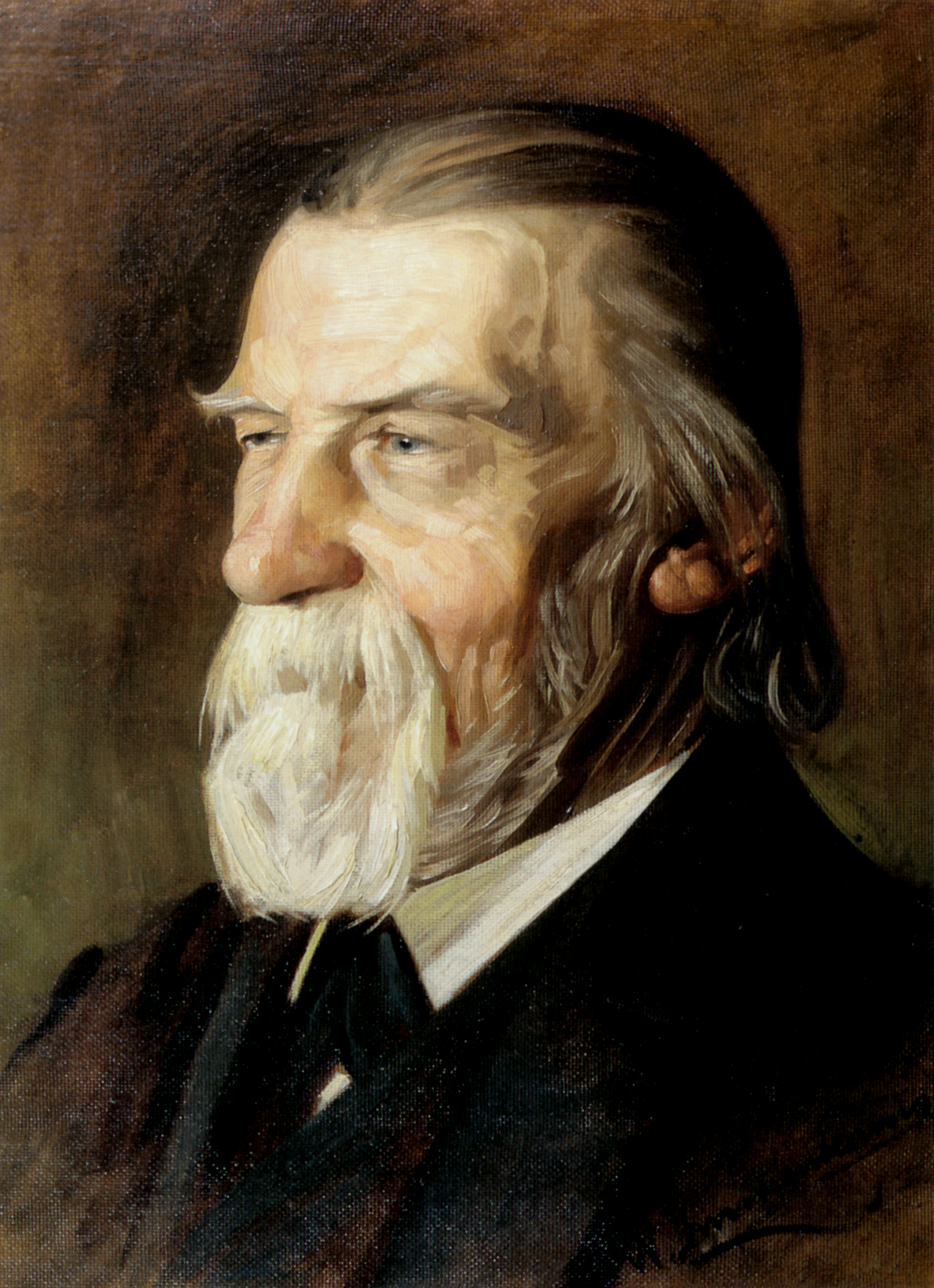
Wilhelm Raabe

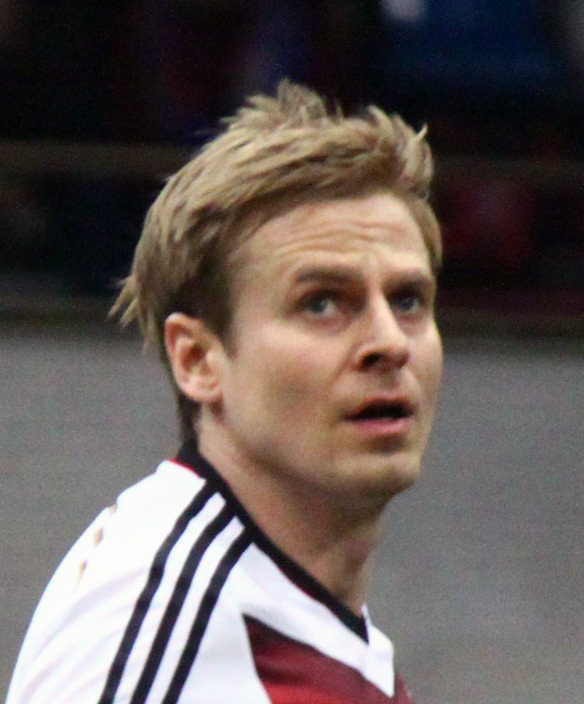
Tobias Rau

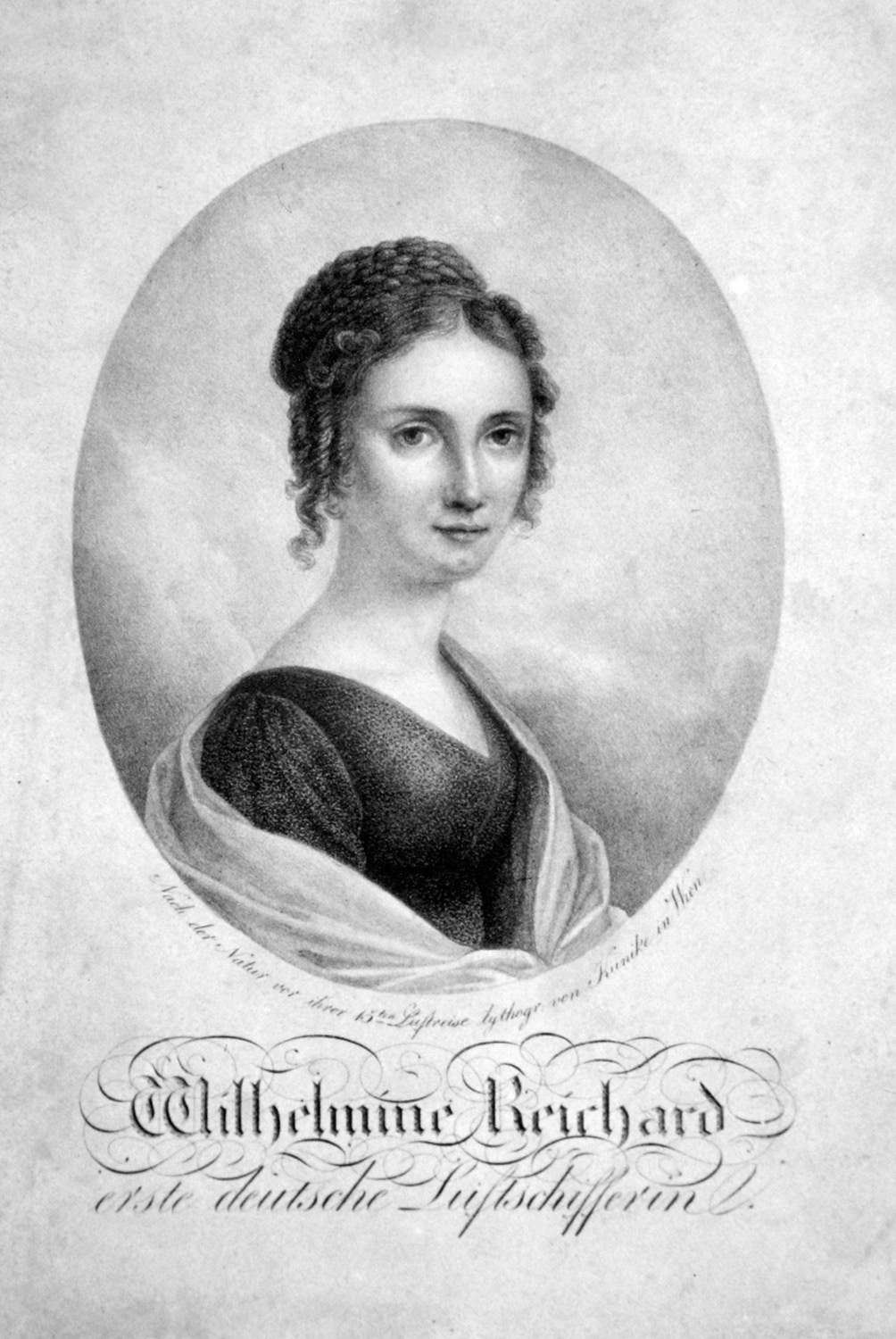
Wilhelmine Reichard

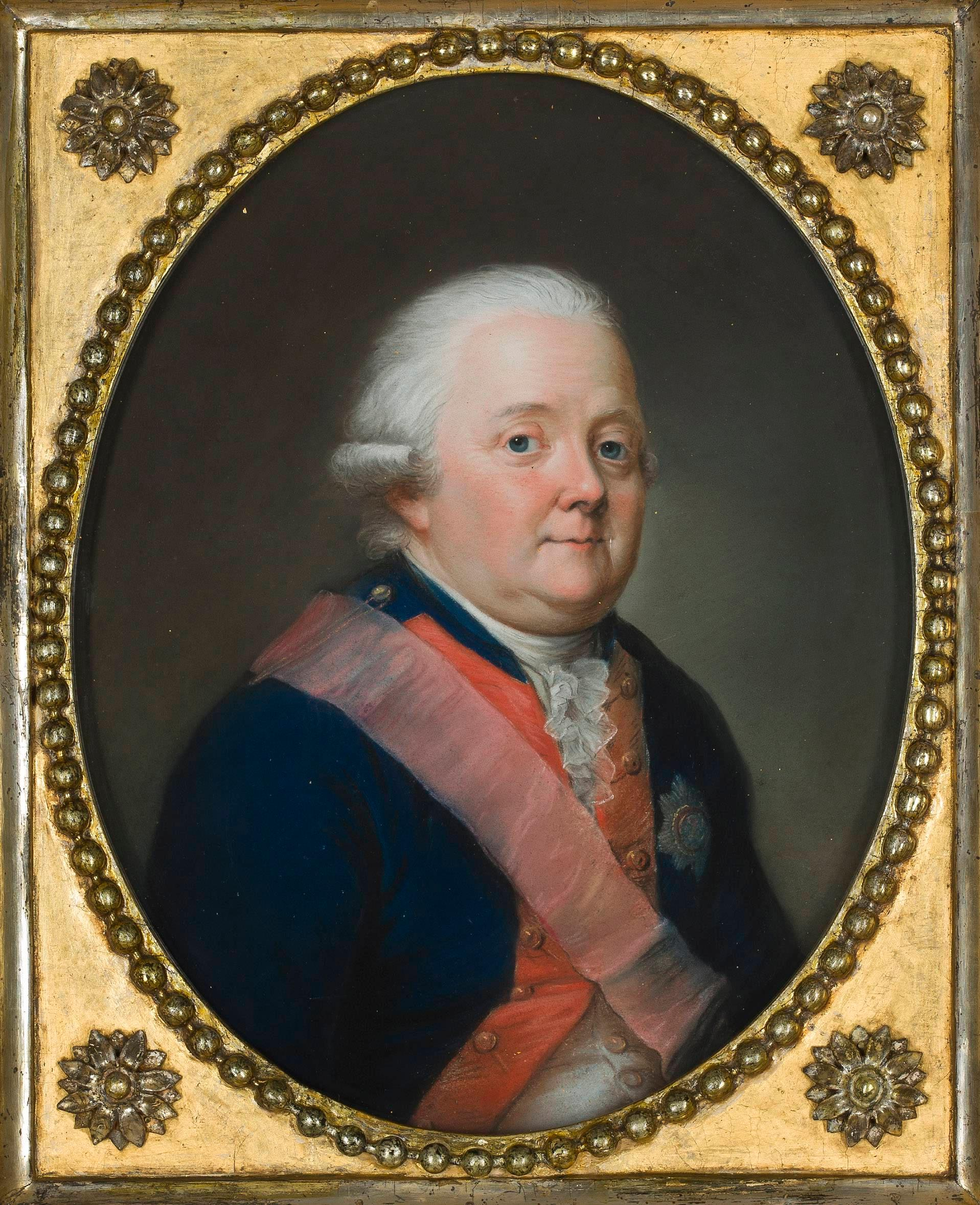
Friedrich Adolf Riedesel

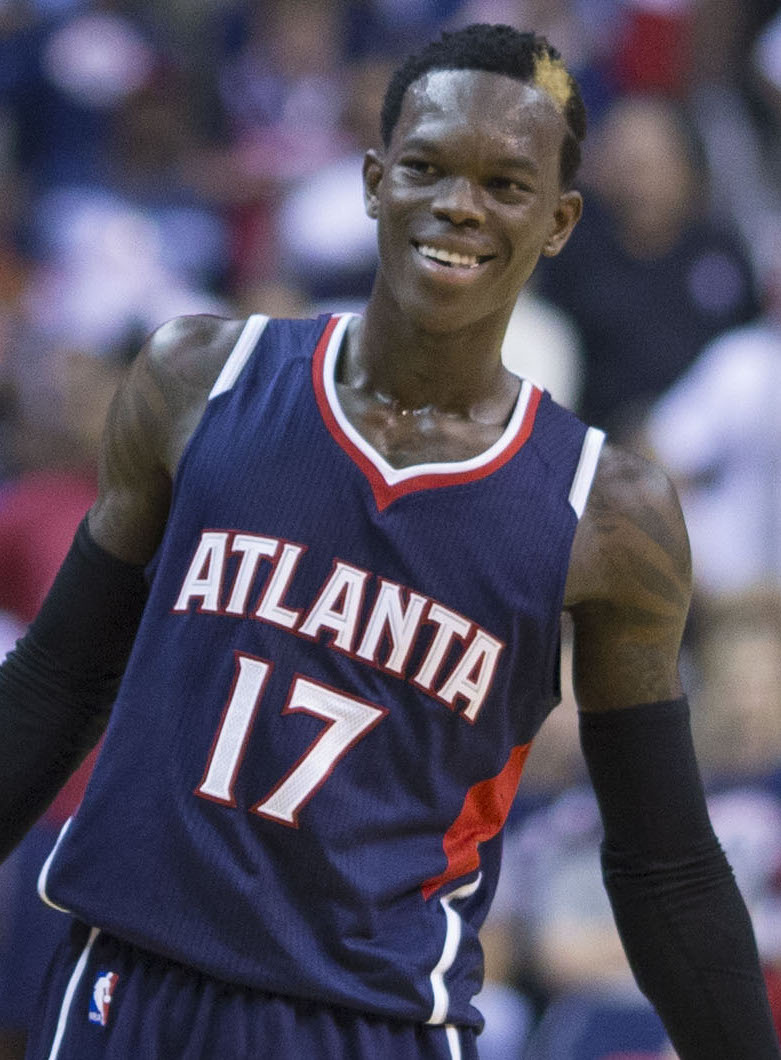
Dennis Schröder

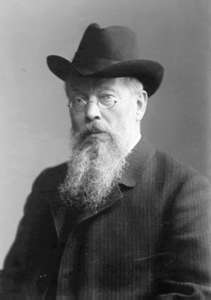
Hans Sommer

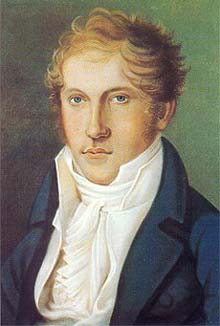
Louis Spohr

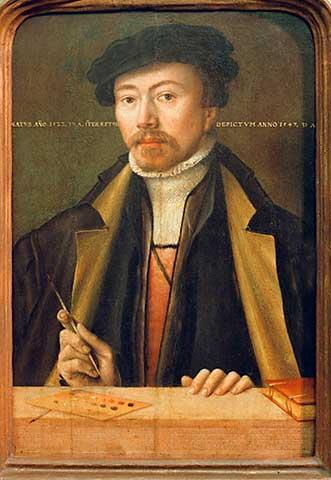
Ludger tom Ring the Younger

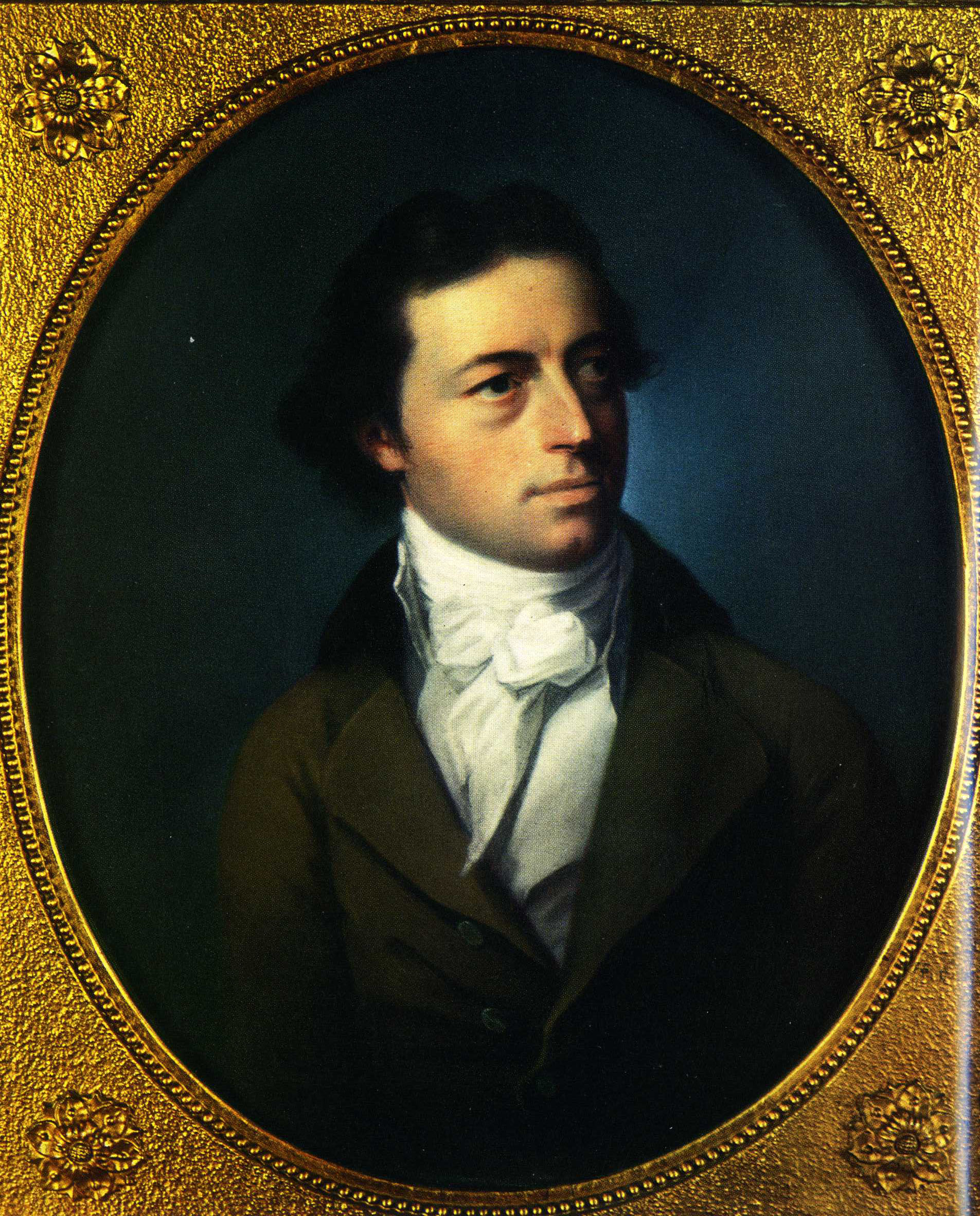
Friedrich Vieweg

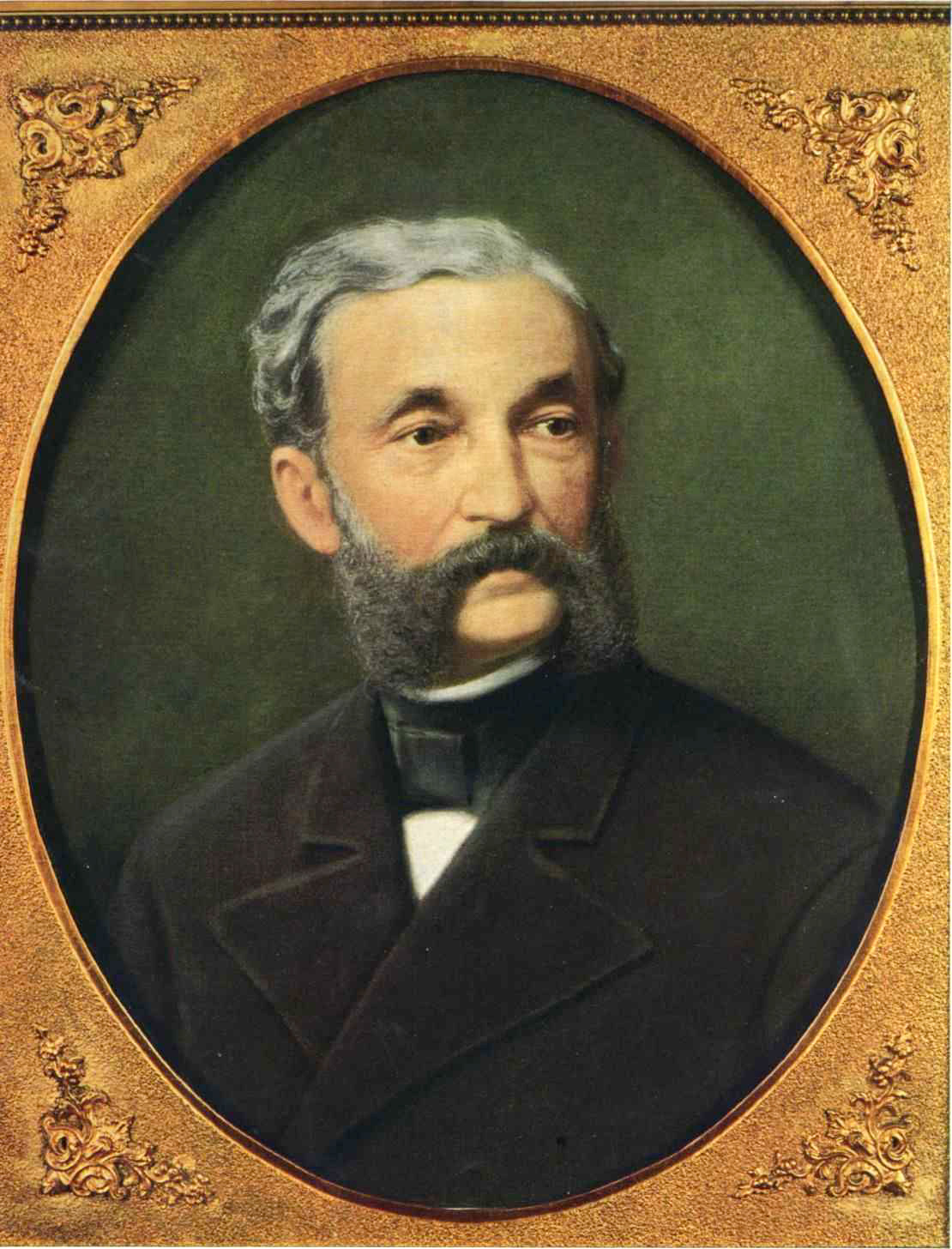
George Westermann

=== A to D ===
- Leopold August Abel (1717–1794), violinist
- Franz Abt (1819–1885), composer
- Albert I (1236–1279), Duke of Brunswick-Lüneburg
- Albert of Prussia (1837–1906), Regent of Brunswick
- Friedrich Alpers (1901–1944), politician
- Anthony Ulrich (1633–1714), Duke of Brunswick-Wolfenbüttel
- Antoinette of Brunswick-Wolfenbüttel (1696–1762), Duchess of Brunswick-Wolfenbüttel
- Johann Arndt (1555–1621), theologian
- Auctor (c. 5th century), patron saint of Braunschweig
- Augusta of Great Britain (1737–1813), Duchess consort of Brunswick-Wolfenbüttel
- Wilhelm Friedemann Bach (1710–1784), composer
- Fritz Bauer (1903–1968), judge and prosecutor, who played an essential role in starting the Frankfurt Auschwitz trials.
- Johann Georg Beck (1676–1722), engraver
- Ernst Otto Beckmann (1853–1923), chemist and inventor of the Beckmann thermometer
- Oswald Berkhan (1834–1917), physician
- Willem Bilderdijk (1756–1831), poet
- Johann Heinrich Blasius (1809–1870), zoologist and founder of the Botanischer Garten der Technischen Universität Braunschweig.
- Hermann Blumenau (1819–1899), founder of Blumenau, Brazil.
- Wilhelm von Bode (1845–1929), art historian
- Friedrich von Bodenstedt (1819–1892), writer
- Caesar Rudolf Boettger (1888–1976), zoologist
- Rasmus Borowski (born 1974), composer and actor
- Maria Antonia Branconi (1746–1793), royal mistress of Charles William Ferdinand, Duke of Brunswick-Wolfenbüttel
- Heinrich Brandes (1803–1868), painter
- Adolf Breymann (1839–1878), sculptor
- Franz Ernst Brückmann (1697–1753), mineralogist
- Brun I (c. 975–c. 1010), Count of Brunswick
- Bruno (died 880), Duke of Saxony
- Victor von Bruns (1812–1883), surgeon
- Heinrich Büssing (1843–1929), industrialist
- Johannes Bugenhagen (1485–1558), theologian
- Joachim Heinrich Campe (1746–1818), educator and writer
- Charles William Ferdinand (1735–1806), Duke of Brunswick-Wolfenbüttel
- Emmanuelle Charpentier (born 1968), biochemist
- Martin Chemnitz (1522–1586), Lutheran theologian and reformer
- Lorenz Florenz Friedrich von Crell (1744–1816), chemist
- Walter Dexel (1890–1973), painter

=== E to J ===
- Johann Erdwin Christoph Ebermaier (1768–1825), physician
- Johann Arnold Ebert (1723–1795), writer
- Carl Friedrich Echtermeier (1845–1910), sculptor
- Egbert II (c. 1060–1090), Count of Brunswick and Margrave of Meissen
- Joachim Nicolas Eggert (1779–1813), composer
- Albert Eichhorn (1856–1926), theologian
- Frauke Eickhoff (born 1967), judoka
- Manfred Eigen (born 1927), Nobel laureate in chemistry
- Theodore Eisfeld (1816–1882), conductor
- Gottlieb Elster (1867–1917), sculptor
- Theodor Engelbrecht (1813–1892), pomologist
- Ernest Augustus (1887–1953), Duke of Brunswick
- Nadine Ernsting-Krienke (born 1974), field hockey player
- Johann Joachim Eschenburg (1743–1820), produced the first complete German translation of William Shakespeare's plays.
- Hansjörg Felmy (1931–2007), actor
- Ferdinand of Brunswick-Wolfenbüttel (1721–1792), field marshal
- Franz Wilhelm Ferling (1796–1874), oboist, composer, and clarinetist
- Alexander Fesca (1820–1849), composer
- Otto Finsch (1839–1917), explorer
- Christoph Bernhard Francke (c. 1660–1729), painter
- Frederick Augustus (1740–1805), Prince of Brunswick-Wolfenbüttel-Oels
- Friedrich Traugott Friedemann (1793–1853), educator
- Kurt Otto Friedrichs (1901–1983), mathematician
- Theodor Geiger (1891–1952), sociologist
- Friedrich Gerstäcker (1816–1872), writer
- Gertrude of Brunswick (c. 1060–1117), Margravine of Meissen
- Silvio Gesell (1862–1930), merchant
- Johann Glandorp (1501–1564), educator
- Gerhard Glogowski (born 1943), politician, Prime Minister of Lower Saxony
- Carl Heinrich Graun (1704–1759), composer
- Uwe Gronostay (1939–2008), composer
- Lord Frederick Spencer Hamilton (1856–1928), politician
- Johann Oswald Harms (1643–1708), painter and engraver
- Johann Adolph Hasse (1699–1783), composer
- Johann Christian Ludwig Hellwig (1743–1831), entomologist
- Ernst Ludwig Theodor Henke (1804–1872), theologian and historian
- Henry the Lion (1129–1195), Duke of Saxony and Bavaria
- Henry V (c. 1173–1227), Count Palatine of the Rhine
- Henry the Peaceful (1411–1473), Duke of Brunswick-Lüneburg
- August Hermann (1835–1906), physical education pioneer
- Levi Herzfeld (1810–1884), rabbi and historian
- Erik Hesselberg (1914–1972), writer and artist
- August Heinrich Hoffmann von Fallersleben (1798–1874), poet and author of Das Lied der Deutschen.
- Israel Jacobson (1768–1828), merchant and Jewish reformer.
- Heinrich Jasper (1875–1945), politician, Prime Minister of Brunswick
- Friedrich Jeckeln (1895–1946), SS and police leader
- Johann Friedrich Wilhelm Jerusalem (1709–1789), theologist
- John Albert of Mecklenburg (1857–1920), Regent of Brunswick
- Wolfgang Joop (born 1944), fashion designer
- Robert Jordan (1885–1970), writer

=== K to R ===
- Reinhard Keiser (1674–1739), composer
- Inge Kilian (born 1935), Olympic high jumper
- Dietrich Klagges (1891–1971), politician
- Klaus von Klitzing (born 1943), Nobel laureate in physics
- Friedrich Ludwig Knapp (1814–1904), chemist
- Gottfried Michael Koenig (1926–2021), composer
- Peter Joseph Krahe (1758–1840), architect
- Nicolette Krebitz (born 1972), actress
- Johann Sigismund Kusser (1660–1727), composer
- Johann Anton Leisewitz (1752–1806), poet
- Ludwig Lemcke (1816–1884), philologist and literary historian
- Gotthold Ephraim Lessing (1729–1781), writer and philosopher
- Ephraim Moses Lilien (1874–1925), illustrator
- Henry Litolff (1818–1891), composer
- Louis Rudolph (1671–1735), Duke of Brunswick-Wolfenbüttel
- Friedrich Lübker (1811–1867), educator and philologist
- Rudi Lüttge (1922–2016), Olympic racewalker
- Matilda of England (1156–1189), Duchess of Saxony
- Marie of Baden (1782–1808), Duchess consort of Brunswick-Wolfenbüttel
- Erwin Otto Marx (1893–1980), engineer
- Jakob Mauvillon (1743–1794), historian and writer
- Jürgen Moll (1939–1968), footballer
- Benno Ohnesorg (1940–1967), university student killed by a policeman during a demonstration in West Berlin
- Otto IV of Brunswick (1175–1218), Holy Roman Emperor
- Philippine Charlotte of Prussia (1716–1801), Duchess consort of Brunswick-Wolfenbüttel
- Helga Pilarczyk (1926–2011), operatic soprano
- Agnes Pockels (1862–1935), chemist
- Werner Pöls (1926–1989), historian
- Karl Pohlig (1864–1928), conductor
- Wilhelm Raabe (1831–1910), writer
- Hans Reinowski (1900–1977), politician, publisher and writer
- Hermann Riedel (1847–1913), composer
- Friedrich Adolf Riedesel (1738–1800), commander during the American Revolutionary War
- Anna Roleffes (c. 1600–1663), one of the last women executed as a witch in Braunschweig.
- Rudolph Augustus (1627–1704), Duke of Brunswick-Wolfenbüttel
- Michael Ruetz (1940–2024), photographer
- Nina Ruge (born 1956), TV presenter
- Francesco Carlo Rusca (1693–1769), painter

=== S to Z ===
- Hermann Schacht (1814–1864), pharmacist and botanist
- Ewald Schnug (born 1954), agricultural researcher, professor, Honorary-President of the International Scientific Center for Fertilizers
- Gerhard Schrader (1903–1990), chemist
- Katharina Marie Schubert (born 1977), actress
- Gustav Anton von Seckendorff (1775–1823), writer
- Hans-Christoph Seebohm (1903–1967), Vice-Chancellor of Germany
- Otto Sprengel (1852–1915), surgeon
- Henry E. (1797–1871) and C.F. Theodore Steinway (1825–1889), piano makers
- Stendhal (1783–1842), writer and politician
- Albert Sukop (1913–1993), German international footballer
- Alexandre Angélique de Talleyrand-Périgord (1736–1821), churchman
- Heinrich Emil Timerding (1873–1945), mathematician
- Fate Tola (born 1987), long-distance runner
- Ludger Tom Ring the Younger (1522–1584), painter
- Julius Tröger (1862–1942), chemist
- Kaspar Ulenberg (1549–1617), theologian
- August Ferdinand von Veltheim (1741–1801), mineralogist
- Victoria Louise of Prussia (1892–1980), Duchess of Brunswick
- Alfred Vierkandt (1867–1953), sociologist
- Friedrich Vieweg (1761–1835), publisher
- Peter Wilhelm Friedrich von Voigtländer (1812–1878), optician
- Heinz Waaske (1924–1995), camera designer
- Mitchell Weiser (born 1994), footballer
- Ehm Welk (1884–1966), journalist
- George Westermann (1810–1879), publisher
- Arend Friedrich Wiegmann (1770–1853), pharmacist
- William V (1748–1806), Prince of Orange
- Olaf Willums (1886–1967), painter and printmaker
- Johannes Winkler (1897–1947), rocket pioneer
- Georg Wittig (1897–1987), Nobel laureate in chemistry
- Werner Zahn (1890–1971), bobsledder and World War I flying ace
- Luminita Zaituc (born 1968), Olympic long-distance runner
- Eberhard August Wilhelm von Zimmermann (1743–1815), geographer and zoologist
- Georg Heinrich Zincke (1692–1769), jurist

== See also ==
- Media related to People of Braunschweig at Wikimedia Commons
- List of Braunschweig University of Technology people
