= List of TU Braunschweig people =

Among the people who have taught or studied at the TU Braunschweig or its precursor, the Collegium Carolinum, are the following:

== Natural sciences and mathematics ==
- Ewald Banse — Geography
- Ernst Otto Beckmann — Chemistry
- August Wilhelm Heinrich Blasius — Zoology and Botany
- Johann Heinrich Blasius — Zoology
- Rudolf Blasius — Bacteriology
- Caesar Rudolf Boettger — Zoology
- Victor von Bruns — Medicine
- Lorenz Florenz Friedrich von Crell — Chemistry and Metallurgy
- Julius Wilhelm Richard Dedekind — Mathematics
- Carl Georg Oscar Drude — Botany
- Manfred Eigen — Biophysical chemistry — Nobel Prize in Chemistry 1967
- Theodor Engelbrecht — Physiology
- Herbert Freundlich — Chemistry
- Robert Fricke — Mathematics
- Kurt Otto Friedrichs — Mathematics
- Karl Theophil Fries — Chemistry
- Gustav Gassner — Botany
- Carl Friedrich Gauß — Mathematics
- Karl Heinrich Gräffe — Mathematics
- Heiko Harborth — Mathematics
- Wolfgang Hahn — Mathematics
- Robert Hartig — Forestry
- Theodor Hartig — Forestry
- Johann Christian Ludwig Hellwig — Entomology
- Adolph Henke — Pharmacology
- Wilhelm Henneberg — Chemistry
- Nikolaus Hofreiter — Mathematics
- Johann Karl Wilhelm Illiger — Zoology
- Henning Kagermann — Physics
- Klaus von Klitzing — Physics — Nobel Prize in Physics 1985
- Friedrich Ludwig Knapp — Chemistry
- August Wilhelm Knoch — Physics
- William F. Martin — Botany
- Rainer Moormann — Physical chemistry
- Justus Mühlenpfordt — Nuclear physics
- Adolph Nehrkorn — Ornithology
- Agnes Pockels — Chemistry
- Friedrich Carl Alwin Pockels — Physics
- Mark Ronan — Mathematics
- Ferdinand Schneider — Chemistry
- Gerhard Schrader — Chemistry
- Kornelia Smalla — Chemistry
- Sami Solanki — Astronomy
- Hans Sommer — Mathematics
- Ferdinand Tiemann — Chemistry
- Heinrich Emil Timerding — Mathematics
- Julius Tröger — Chemistry
- Irene Wagner-Döbler — Microbiology
- Gerd Wedler — Chemistry
- Christian Rudolph Wilhelm Wiedemann — Anatomy and Entomology
- Arend Friedrich Wiegmann — Botany
- Georg Wittig — Chemistry — Nobel Prize in Chemistry 1979
- Eberhard August Wilhelm von Zimmermann — Zoogeography

== Humanities and theology ==
- Johann Joachim Eschenburg — Literary history
- Ernst Ludwig Theodor Henke — Theology and Philosophy
- Christoph Luetge — Philosophy
- Willy Moog — Philosophy
- Neal R. Norrick — English Linguistics
- Werner Pöls — History
- Nina Ruge — German language and literature
- Gustav Anton von Seckendorff — Philosophy and Aesthetics
- Gerhard Vollmer — Philosophy
- Justus Friedrich Wilhelm Zachariae — Poetry

== Social sciences ==
- Theodor Geiger — Sociology
- Jakob Mauvillon — Military science
- Ulrich Menzel — Political science
- Alfred Vierkandt — Ethnology and Sociology

== Architecture, engineering sciences, and environmental sciences ==
- Oliver Blume — Mechanical engineering
- Adolf Busemann — Aerospace engineering
- Heinrich Büssing — Engineering
- Meinhard von Gerkan — Architecture
- Walter Henn — Architecture
- Friedrich Wilhelm Kraemer — Architecture
- Boris Laschka — Aeronautical engineering
- Erwin Otto Marx — Electrical engineering
- Dieter Oesterlen — Architecture
- August Orth — Architecture
- Carl Theodor Ottmer — Architecture
- Roland Rainer — Architecture
- Ernst Sagebiel — Architecture
- Hermann Schlichting — Aeronautical engineering
- Kurt Tank — Aeronautical engineering
- Constantin Uhde — Architecture
- Friedrich Voss — Civil engineering
- Ludwig Winter — Architecture

== Fine arts ==
- Carl Friedrich Echtermeier — Sculpture
- Gottlieb Elster — Sculpture
- Georg Ferdinand Howaldt — Sculpture
