= Hartmut Bossel =

German environmental scientist and systems scientist

- Born: 3 March 1935 (age 91); Braunschweig, Germany
- Education: Technische Universität Darmstadt
- Known for: Environmental science; Systems science; System dynamics
- Scientific career
- Workplaces: University of Kassel, University of California
- Website: www.hartmutbossel.de

Hartmut Bossel (born 3 March 1935) is a German environmental scientist and systems scientist. Bossel was a professor of environmental systems analysis and director of the Scientific Center for Environmental Systems Research and Environmental Systems Analysis Group at the University of Kassel, Germany, until his retirement in 1997.

Bossel collaboratively developed a number of computer simulation models and decision support systems in the following areas: energy supply policy, global dynamics, orientation of behavior, agricultural policy, forest dynamics and management, sustainable development, and indicator systems. Bossel also wrote a number of textbooks on the modeling and simulation of dynamic systems, social change, future paths, and sustainable development.

Bossel and co-author Florentin Krause are credited with coining the term Energiewende, used to describe the change in German energy policy from 2010 onwards, in 1980.

== Life ==
Bossel graduated from the Technische Universität Darmstadt in 1961 with a diploma in mechanical engineering (aeronautical sciences). He worked at the Northrop Corporation in Los Angeles until 1963. He was an assistant professor at the University of California, Berkeley, where he was awarded a PhD in engineering (aeronautical sciences) in 1967. From 1967 to 1972, he was a professor of mechanical engineering at the University of California, Santa Barbara.

After returning to Germany in 1972, Bossel worked at the Fraunhofer Institute for Systems and Innovation Research (ISI) in Karlsruhe and from 1978 at the Institute of Systems Analysis and Forecasting (ISP Eduard Pestel) in Hannover. In 1979, he was appointed a professor at the University of Kassel where he held the chair of Environmental Systems Analysis and was the director of the Scientific Center for Environmental Systems Research and Environmental Systems Analysis Group. He was a member of the Balaton Group from its inception. Bossel completed several research sabbaticals abroad, including in the US, France, the former Yugoslavia, the Soviet Union, China, Malaysia, Indonesia, and New Zealand.

Bossel married in 1961 and has three children.

== Selected bibliography ==
- Bossel, Hartmut; Klaczko, Salomon; Müller, Norbert (1976). Systems theory in the social sciences: stochastic and control systems, pattern recognition, fuzzy analysis, simulation, behavioral models. Basel, Switzerland and Stuttgart, Germany: Birkhäuser. ISBN 3-7643-0822-2.
- Bossel, Hartmut (1977). Concepts and tools of computer-assisted policy analysis — Volume 1. Basel, Switzerland and Stuttgart, Germany: Birkhäuser.
- Bossel, Hartmut (1977). Concepts and tools of computer-assisted policy analysis — Volume 2. Basel, Switzerland and Stuttgart, Germany: Birkhäuser. ISBN 3-7643-0922-9.
- Bossel, Hartmut (1977). Concepts and tools of computer-assisted policy analysis — Volume 3. Basel, Switzerland and Stuttgart, Germany: Birkhäuser. ISBN 3-7643-0923-7.
- Krause, Florentin; Bossel, Hartmut; Müller-Reißmann, Karl-Friedrich (1980). Energie-Wende: Wachstum und Wohlstand ohne Erdöl und Uran [Energy transition: growth and prosperity without petroleum and uranium] (PDF) (in German). S Fischer Verlag. ISBN 3-10-007705-9. Archived from the original (PDF) on 14 September 2016.
- Bossel, Hartmut (1986). Ecological systems analysis: an introduction to modelling and simulation. Kassel, Germany: Department of Environmental Systems Research Group, University of Kassel. ISBN 3-88122-327-4.
- Bossel, Hartmut; Bruenig, EF (1992). Natural resource systems analysis: ecological and socio-economic systems and sensitivity analysis for the conservation and management of forest ecosystems and natural resources in South-East Asia. Feldafing, Germany: German Foundation for International Development (DSE). ISBN 3-924441-55-3.
- Bossel, Hartmut (1994). Modeling and simulation. Taylor & Francis. ISBN 1-56881-033-4.
- Bossel, Hartmut (1998). Earth at a crossroads: paths to a sustainable future. Cambridge, UK: Cambridge University Press. ISBN 0-521-63995-6.
- Bossel, Hartmut (1999). Indicators for sustainable development: theory, method, applications: a report to the Balaton Group. Winnipeg, Canada: International Institute for Sustainable Development (IISD). ISBN 1-895536-13-8.
- Bossel, Hartmut (2007). Systems and models: complexity, dynamics, evolution, sustainability. Norderstedt, Germany: Books on Demand. ISBN 978-3-8334-8121-5.
- Bossel, Hartmut (2007). System zoo 1 simulation models: elementary systems, physics, engineering. Norderstedt, Germany: Books on Demand. ISBN 978-3-8334-8422-3.
- Bossel, Hartmut (2007). Systems zoo 2 simulation models: climate, ecosystems, resources. Norderstedt, Germany: Books on Demand. ISBN 978-3-8334-8423-0.
- Bossel, Hartmut (2007). Systems zoo 3 simulation models: economy, society, development. Norderstedt, Germany: Books on Demand. ISBN 978-3-8334-8424-7.

== See also ==
- Computer simulation
- Environmental systems analysis
- Integrated assessment modelling
- Sustainable development
- Systems science
- Systems theory
