= Johann Zanger =

German jurist

Johann Zanger (1557 – 6 September 1607) was a German jurist, professor of law at Wittenberg University.

Born in Brunswick, from 1576 Zanger studied law at Wittenberg University under Hugo Donellus. Subsequently studying in Italy, he gained a doctorate at Basel University in 1580. From 1581 onwards he was professor and judge at the aulic court of justice in Wittenberg. He later became a member of the court of lay assessors, the consistory and the regional court of Lower Lusatia.

Zanger became first professor of law at Wittenberg in 1594. He was an author condemned in the Index Librorum Prohibitorum in 1596. He died in Wittenberg on 6 September 1607.

== Works ==
- De quaestionibus seu torturis, 1593
