= Arnold Rimpau =

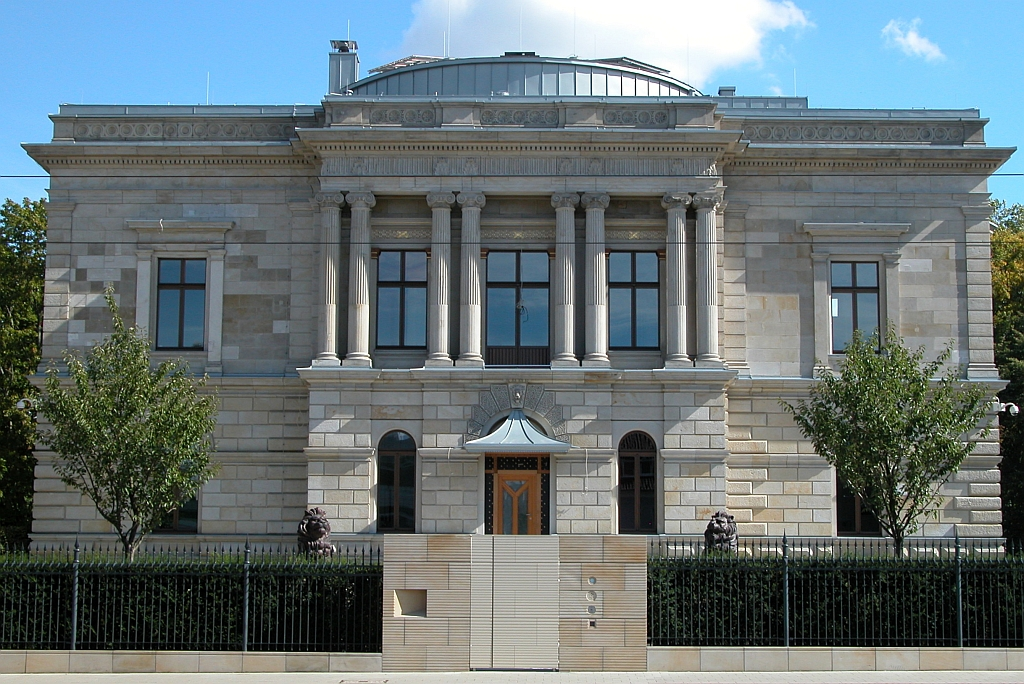
- The Rimpausche Villa in 2010
- Born: Ludwig Arnold Rimpau; 5 June 1856; Braunschweig, Duchy of Brunswick
- Died: 2 January 1936 (aged 79); Bandelstorf, Germany
- Occupations: Entrepreneur, estate owner

Ludwig Arnold Rimpau (5 July 1856 – 2 January 1936) was a German estate owner and entrepreneur.

== Life and work ==
Arnold Rimpau was born in Braunschweig, the son of businessman August Rimpau, and came from an agricultural and business family, who had been resident there since the 17th century. After completing his Abitur at Martino-Katharineum, he began his commercial training in Bremen and England at his father's company.

Within the Norddeutschen Torfmoorgesellschaft (North German peat bog company) he took part in the development of Großes Moor north of Gifhorn. After he was successful in this endeavor, he began to manage the large agricultural estates, where he established the Volwerke of "Arnoldshof" and "Mathildenhof". Additionally, he ensured that the peat on his estates was mechanized. He worked to process peat in Gifhorner Fabriken zu Brennmaterial (Gifhorn factories to fuel) and Mull. In addition to this, he extended the streets, and Isenbüttel.

Before the Industrial Revolution Arnold Rimpau belonged to the Kern des Wirtschaftsbürgertums (core of economic bourgeoisie). In 1848 he was the fifth maximally taxed person (Stelle der Höchstbesteuerten). and felt, like other wealthy residents of Braunschweig - bound to funding the public good. As a result, Rimpau donated money for the conservation of timber-framed buildings and church paintings.

He lived as a representative of his estate, Villa Rimpau, where are its height was the social focus of the city's important residents, such as Ina Seidel and Heinrich Sohnrey. He died in Bandelstorf, aged 79.

== Literature ==
- Horst-Rüdiger Jarck, Günter Scheel (Hrsg.): Braunschweigisches Biographisches Lexikon. 19. und 20. Jahrhundert, Hannover 1996, ISBN 3775258388
