= Simson Alexander David =

Simson Alexander David (November 13, 1755 – Winter 1813) was a German art dealer, author, journalist, and member of the French secret police in the Napoleonic era, who was also known as Karl Julius Lange.

Born as Simson Alexander David in Brunswick, Principality of Brunswick-Wolfenbüttel as the tenth and youngest son of the "court jew" Alexander David, he grew up in a family with a great fortune and much political influence. His father was one of the most respected advisers of duke Charles (Karl) I., who needed the wealth of his "Kammeragent" or chamber agent for his luxury expenditures. With the death of his father (1765), young Simson inherited at least 10 000 gold taler, worth a few million dollars compared to the purchasing power of the present. Due to the financial inability and extravagance of his young mother Deborah Siemons, Simson was in danger of becoming bankrupt, even before he started as an adult his own business as an arts dealer. Only the intervention of his guardian saved him from early ruin.

Under the name Alexander Daveson, he started his business in the year 1778. Even while he had famous customers like the duke of Brunswick, the scientist Georg Christoph Lichtenberg and Johann Wolfgang von Goethe, his income seems to have been very modest. Plans to produce a collection of copies of ancient engraved gems never became reality. Shortly after he was involved in a scandal at the very popular lottery of nearby Kassel (April 1779). The authorities of Kassel suspected Simson of fraud by consistently filling out lots after the drawings. The successor of the late duke of Brunswick, Karl Wilhelm Ferdinand, sent him to jail. Despite a detailed investigation, there was no incriminating evidence against Simson. Maybe the new duke only wanted to take revenge against the man who had sold many luxury goods to the former duke.

While in jail at Brunswick, the only man, who helped Simson was the famous author and librarian Gotthold Ephraim Lessing, who had great sympathies for outsiders of all kind. After his release Simson moved to Lessings home at Wolfenbüttel and stayed with him until the death of his benefactor (February 15, 1781). Lessing literally died "in the arms" of Simson, a fact, that was stubbornly disbelieved by the local public, who felt annoyed by it. Even after his death, Lessing was regularly criticized by authorities and Christian contemporaries for his contacts with Jews and "dubious people". Many years later, Simson asserted, that he helped Lessing with a lot of money, for the librarian got only a very modest salary from the duke.

Soon after Lessings death, Simson travelled to England, where he stayed nine years. Since no detailed information or documents were found in the archives about these years of Simsons life, it is left to speculation, what kind of profession he had. Maybe he worked as a teacher, translator, travel companion or even Deklamator (recitator). He contended having been a student of the English language, trained by the prominent London publicist and philologist Samuel Johnson. Apparently Simson attended consistently British parliament sessions, being enthusiastic about the prominent orators, especially the liberal politician Charles James Fox, who openly sympathized with the American and later on with the French revolution.

In October 1790 Simson came back to Germany, having become at that time a warm admirer of British culture and politics. He appeared at Hamburg first under the name Charles Lange, altering it shortly afterwards to Karl Julius Lange (apparently he was baptized). At the same time he adopted arbitrarily the title of a "professor of eloquence and English language". On the stage of the Hamburg theatre he tried to impress the audience with "attic entertainment", excerpts from Shakespeare plays and parliamentary debates. The spectators reacted with ridicule and laughter. Simson was mocked at for his small stature, his unmanageable hair, his bad teeth and his total inability to act. Nevertheless, Simson repeatedly tried to make a living as an actor. In Brunswick he was welcomed by the court and got a chance to perform with recitations in the local opera house, being applauded at least by the attending court members.

After a short stay at Hanover and Vienna, where he published his first article about German language in the Wiener Zeitung, he went on a voyage to Switzerland. In 1794 he settled at Schweinfurt, Upper Franconia, where he married the sister of a Bayreuth official and wrote his first, two-volume book (Über die Schweiz und die Schweizer/On Switzerland and the Swiss). It was widely discussed in the German and Swiss press, because Karl Julius Lange criticized the political system of Swiss cities like Zurich and Basel as undemocratic and inhuman.

For a few months Lange worked as a journalist for the Englische Blätter, a magazine about English politics, which was published at Erlangen. In 1796 he started his career as secret press agent of Karl-August von Hardenberg, the Prussian minister for the recently acquired Franconian principalities of Bayreuth and Ansbach. Hardenberg urgently needed a capable journalist for his propaganda against local and regional noblemen, who felt overruled by Prussia and who looked for some help in Vienna, where the Austrian Emperor took any chance to weaken Prussia.

After several years as the much lauded editor-in-chief of the firmly democratic and liberal Deutsche Reichs- und Staatszeitung, Lange was sent to jail in May 1799 at Bayreuth for insulting the Emperor and the Austrian army. He had insinuated, that the Austrian authorities actively participated in the murder of three French diplomats at the Rastatt peace talks on April 29, 1799. This allegation was never confirmed, but many eyewitnesses of the Rastatt events shared Simson's perception. Even while he had published his biweekly newspaper and all his personal articles with the secret assistance and subsidies of Hardenberg, the minister could not help him any longer, for the Berlin authorities had no interest in provoking the Austrian government.

Lange twice fled from jail and emigrated to Altona, then a Danish town next to Hamburg with a very liberal press law. The next years he published a lot of articles and books about his life at Bayreuth, his sentence and stubbornly tried to get a pardon from the Prussian king. Not before 1804, when political circumstances had changed a lot, he could return to Prussia and moved to Berlin, becoming a journalist and propagandist of Karl August von Hardenberg again. He released a few magazines, who all had a very limited life span, for Simson again and again had troubles with the censorship (Der Nordische Merkur, Der deutsche Herold).

With the outbreak of the Prussian-French war in early autumn of 1806, Lange started a new paper Der Telegraph. It was the first German daily newspaper.

His political views changed, following the victory of Napoleon at Jena and Auerstedt. In two weeks, he changed from being a Prussian patriot to being an admirer of Napoleon and the French army. This made him a hated man in Berlin. He was blamed of being corrupt and opportunistic. He criticized the old Prussian regime as outdated and swore at Queen Luise, then an admired woman in Prussia.

After the withdrawal of the French from Berlin in December 1808, Lange went with the French army to Stettin and Erfurt, but his Telegraph was never published again after December 3, notwithstanding the personal will of Napoleon, who tried to revive the paper in January 1809. Lange worked as a consultant of the French army in the censorship of German newspapers. The Bamberg journalist Georg Wilhelm Friedrich Hegel, later on a famous philosopher, and the author August von Kotzebue mocked Lange as a corrupt servant of the French.

In the summer of 1811 Lange planned to write his memoirs in Frankfurt, but they were never published. According to newspaper articles of March 1813, Lange died at Minsk, presumably in the last months of 1812 or early 1813. There is no information about his job or even how he came there. According to a note from the Bayreuth city archive, he was a "civilian official" with the French army, who invaded Russia in 1812. His wife Caroline lived in poverty in Bayreuth and died January 1848.

== Writings ==
- Alexander Daveson ( i.e. S. A. David): Verzeichniss von Kunstsachen, welche zu haben sind (...), Braunschweig 1776
- Anonym (d.i.S. A. David): Über die Schweiz und die Schweizer, Berlin 1795.
- Alexander Daveson (i.e. S. A. David): Ueber Lessings Denkmal. In: August von Hennings: Genius der Zeit. 1796 (darin persönliche Erinnerungen Davids an Lessing).
- Karl Julius Lange (i.e. . S. A. David): Gesandtenmord unter Karl V.: Ein Beitrag zur Geschichte des Völkerrechts im 16. Jahrhundert. Hamburg 1799.
- Karl Julius Lange (i.e. S. A. David): Betrachtungen über die fünf Friedensschlüsse, Altona 1802.
- Karl Julius Lange (i.e. S. A. David): Die Chronik. Ein Journal. Hamburg 1802.
- Karl Julius Lange (i.e. S. A. David): Der nordische Merkur. Ein Journal historischen, politischen und litterarischen Inhalts. Berlin 1805.
- Karl Julius Lange (i.e. S. A. David): Der Telegraph. Ein Journal der neuesten Kriegsbegebenheiten. Berlin 1806–1808.
