= Wilhelmine Reichard =

German aeronaut (1788–1848)

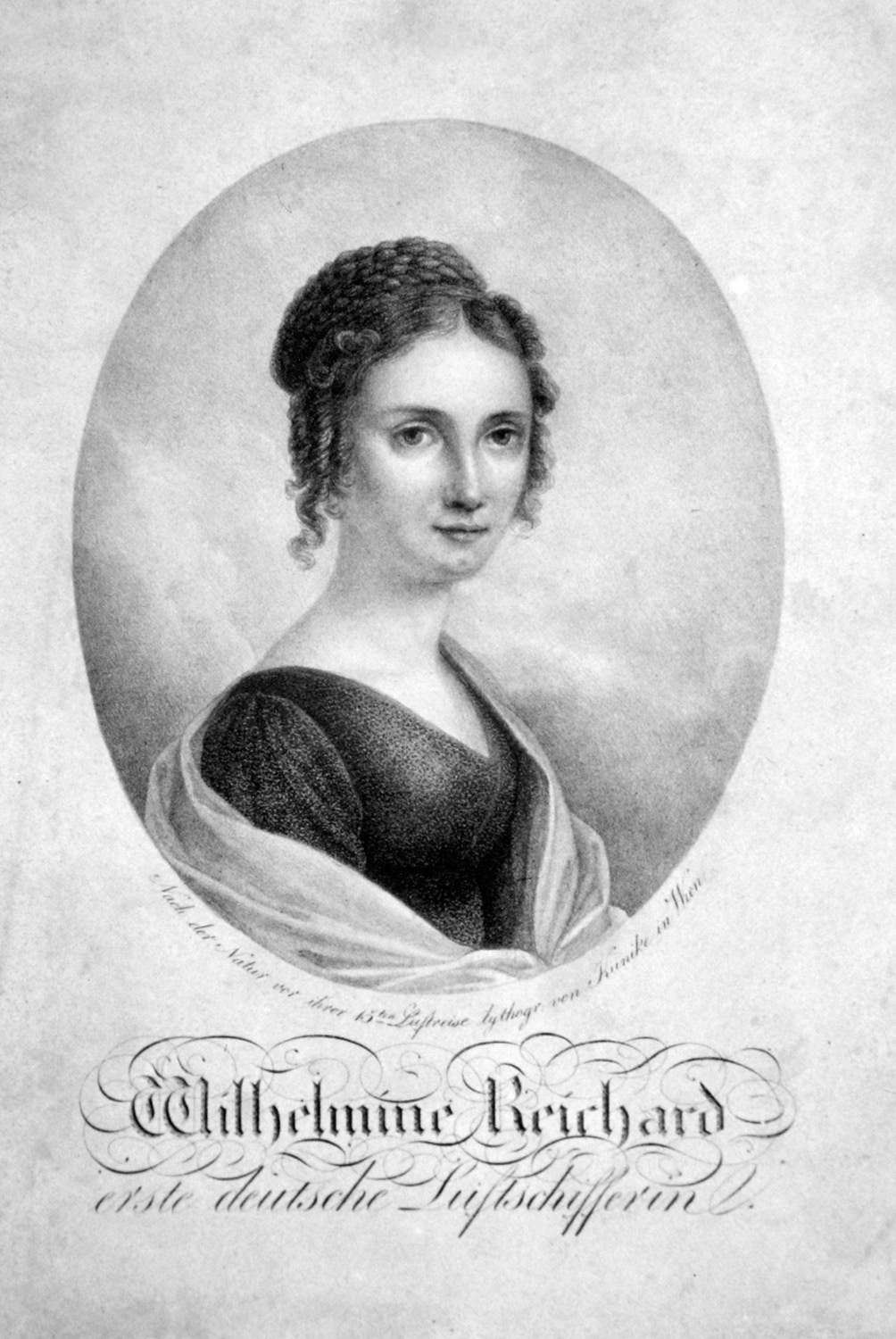
- Wilhelmine Reichard around 1820
- Born: 2 April 1788; Brunswick, Brunswick-Wolfenbüttel, Brunswick-Lüneburg, Holy Roman Empire
- Died: 23 February 1848 (aged 59); Döhlen, Kingdom of Saxony, German Confederation
- Occupation: Balloonist
- Known for: First solo balloon flight by a German woman
- Spouse: Johann Gottfried Reichard

Johanne Wilhelmine Siegmundine Reichard (née Schmidt; 2 April 1788 – 23 February 1848) was a German aeronaut who was the first German female balloonist.

== Biography ==
Reichard was the daughter of a cup-bearer of the Duchy of Brunswick-Lüneburg. She married chemist and physicist Johann Gottfried Reichard in 1807 and their first child was born the same year. The family moved to Berlin in 1810. That same year, Johann Gottfried Reichard made his first flight in a self-constructed gas balloon from Berlin, making him the second person to fly in a gas balloon in Germany.

On 16 April 1811, Wilhelmine Reichard made her first solo flight starting in Berlin. She reached a height of over 5,000 metres (16,000 ft) and landed safely in Genshagen, 33.5 kilometres (20.8 mi) from her starting point. This was not the first solo flight by a woman in Germany; the Frenchwoman Sophie Blanchard had previously made a flight in September 1810, starting from Frankfurt. Reichard's third flight in 1811 reached a height of approximately 7,800 metres (25,600 ft). Due to the altitude, she lost consciousness and her balloon crash-landed in a forest; badly injured, she was rescued by local farmers.

After some difficulties during the Napoleonic Wars, her husband wanted to purchase a chemical factory in Döhlen. To raise the money, Wilhemine Reichard conducted several more flights. Her first flight after the accident in 1811 took place in October 1816. A later flight took place during the Congress of Aix-la-Chapelle in Aachen in 1818. Flights in Prague and Vienna also made her known in Austria-Hungary. Her last flight was in October 1820, starting in Munich at the Oktoberfest, which was held on the 10th anniversary of the first Oktoberfest. In 1821, the chemical factory started operations.

Wilhelmine's husband conducted balloon flights until 1835. He died in 1844, and Wilhelmine managed the chemical factory until her own death in 1848.
