= Maria Antonia Branconi =

German royal mistress (1746–1793)

Maria Antonia von Branconi
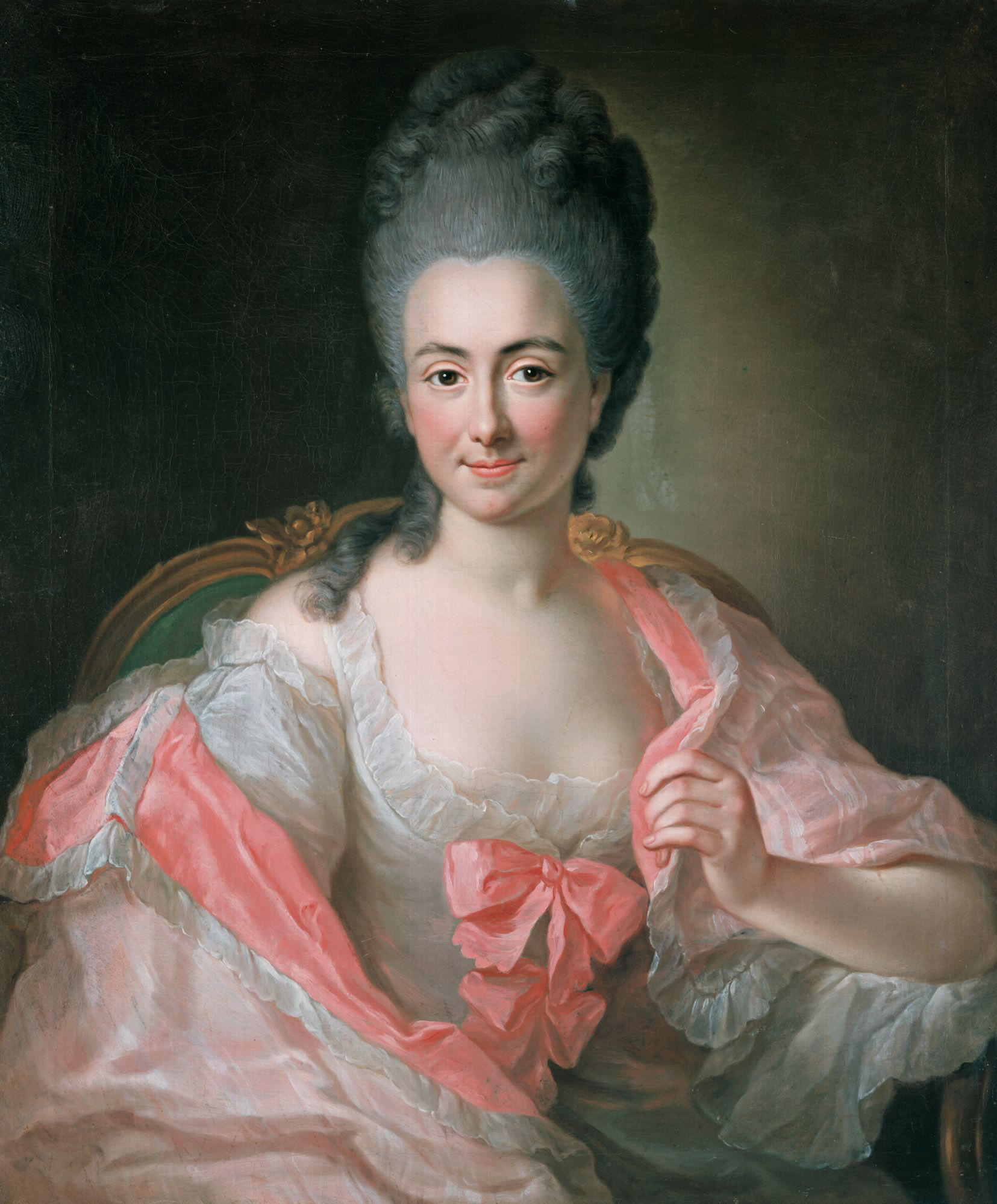
- Born: 27 October 1746; Genoa, Republic of Genoa
- Died: 7 July 1793 (aged 46); Abano
- Known for: Royal mistress

Maria Antonia von Branconi (née Elsener; 27 October 1746 in Genoa – 7 July 1793 in Abano) was the official royal mistress of Charles William Ferdinand, Duke of Brunswick-Wolfenbüttel between 1766 and 1777.

== Biography ==
Maria Antonia von Branconi was the daughter of German-Italian parents and was raised in Naples. At the age of twelve, she married the royal official Francesco de Pessina Branconi (d. 21 October 1766), with whom she had one daughter and one son.

In November 1766, she met the heir of the throne of Brunswick, who made a study trip through Europe after his marriage in 1764. She entered into a relationship with him and followed him back to Brunswick in Germany, where she became his official favorite. The couple had a child, Karl Anton Ferdinand (1767–1794).

Branconi lived in her own palace at Wilhelmstrasse in Brunswick. In 1774, she was ennobled by emperor Joseph II as "von Branconi".

The relationship with Charles was ended in 1777, when he began an affair with Baroness Luise Henriette von Hertefeld (1750–1806), maid-of-honor to his aunt the queen of Prussia. He appointed her secular convent lady of Steterburg.

Branconi made several trips in Europe and lived in Paris 1787–91. She had a son, Jules Adolph Marie, in a new relationship in 1788. Branconi was acquainted with the professors at the university of Brunswick, among them JJ Eschenburg and Johann Arnold Ebert. She was also acquainted with Johann Wilhelm Ludwig Gleim, Sophie von La Roche and Johann Caspar Lavater. She was a friend of Johann Wolfgang von Goethe.
