= Environmental systems analysis =

Method of examining of human actions that affect the nature

Environmental systems analysis (ESA) is a systematic and systems based approach for describing human actions impacting on the natural environment to support decisions and actions aimed at perceived current or future environmental problems. Impacts of different types of objects are studied that ranges from projects, programs and policies, to organizations, and products. Environmental systems analysis encompasses a family of environmental assessment tools and methods, including life cycle assessment (LCA), material flow analysis (MFA) and substance flow analysis (SFA), and environmental impact assessment (EIA), among others.

== Overview ==
ESA studies aims at describing the environmental repercussions of defined human activities. These activities are mostly effective through use of different technologies altering material and energy flows, or (in)directly changing ecosystems (e.g. through changed land-use, agricultural practices, logging etc.), leading to undesired environmental impacts in a, more or less, specifically defined geographical area, and time, ranging from local to global. The basis for the analytical procedures used in ESA studies is the perception of flows of matter and energy associated to causal chains linking human activities to the environmental changes of concern. Some methods are focusing different parts or aspects of the energy/matter flows or the causal chains, where flow models like MFA or LCA deals with the more or less human controlled societal flows while, e.g. ecological risk assessment (ERA) is related to disentangling environmental causal chains. Environmental systems analysis studies has been suggested to be divided between "full" and "attributional" approaches. The full mode covers identified material and energy flows and associated processes leading to environmental impacts. The attributional approach, on the other hand, is based on an analysis of the processes needed to fulfil a certain purpose such as the function that a product delivers. The combination of methods (e.g. LCA and environmental risk assessment) has also been of interest

Methods can be grouped into procedural and analytical approaches. The procedural ones (e.g. EIA or strategic environmental assessment, SEA) focus on the procedure around the analysis, while the analytical ones (e.g. LCA, MFA) put the main focus on technical aspects of the analysis, and can be used as parts of the procedural approaches. Regarding the impacts studied, the environmental issues cover both effects of natural resource use and other environmental impacts, e.g. due to emissions of chemicals, or other agents. In addition, environmental systems analysis studies can cover or be based on economic accounts (life cycle costing, cost-benefit analysis, input-output analysis, systems for economic and environmental accounts), or consider social aspects. The objects of study are distinguished into five categories. These are projects, policies and plans, regions or nations, firms and other organizations, products and functions, and substances.

Further, environmental systems analysis studies are often used to support decision making and it is acknowledged that the decision context varies and is of importance. This regards, for example, that business activities can be related in different ways to the products and other objects studied in environmental systems analysis.

== History ==
A perception of a coherent family of tools and methods for ESA started to become established by findings published in the year 2000. Common characteristics were found to recently have appeared across tools and methods that had previously been seen as distinct from each other. The characteristics were full and attribution approaches, respectively, and the tools and methods were each earlier determined by one unique combination of flow object, spatial boundary and relation to time.

An overview of tools and methods for ESA was published five years later. It was to a large extent based on a series of reports and also drew on the life cycle management project CHAINET. The series of reports covered for example an introduction to tools for Esa that also related them to decision situations, and a study on differences and similarities between tools for esa where a short case study on heat production was included. In the CHAINET project, commissioned by the EU Environment and Climate programme, analytical tools for decision making were studied regarding demand and supply of environmental information, while procedural ESA approaches were not covered.

An expansion of the field has occurred and a number of scientific journals publish extensively on the application of ESA methods e.g. Energy and Environmental Science, Environmental Science and Technology, Journal of Cleaner Production, International Journal of Life-cycle Assessment, and Journal of Industrial Ecology

== Tools and methods ==
The environmental systems analysis tools and methods include:

- Cost-benefit analysis (CBA)
- Ecological footprint (EF)
- Energy analysis (En)
- Environmental impact assessment (EIA)
- Environmental management system (EMS)
- Input-output analysis (IOA)
- Life-cycle assessment (LCA)
- Life-cycle cost analysis (LCCA)
- Material flow accounting (MFA)
- Risk assessment
- Strategic environmental assessment (SEA)
- Systems for economic and environmental accounts (SEEA)

== See also ==
- Carbon footprint
- Cleaner production
- Ecological economics
- Environmental management
- Industrial ecology
- Sustainability
- Sustainable development
- Sustainability measurement
- Technology assessment
