= Karl Heinrich Gräffe =

German mathematician (1799–1873)

- Born: 7 November 1799; Braunschweig, Principality of Brunswick-Wolfenbüttel (now Germany)
- Died: 2 December 1873 (aged 74); Zürich, Switzerland
- Education: University of Göttingen
- Scientific career
- Fields: Mathematics
- Workplaces: University of Zurich
- Thesis: Commentatio historiam calculi variationum inde ab origine calculi differentialis atque integralis usque ad nostra tempora complectens (1825)
- Doctoral advisor: Bernhard Thibaut

Karl Heinrich Gräffe (7 November 1799 – 2 December 1873) was a German mathematician, who was professor at the University of Zurich.

== Life and work ==
Gräffe's father migrated to North America, leaving the family business of jewelry in his hands. Even so, Gräffe succeeded, studying at night, entering the Carolineum of Brunswick in 1821. From 1823, he studied at the University of Göttingen with professors Gauss and Thibaut, doctorate in 1825.

In 1828 he was appointed professor of the Zurich Institute of Technology and, as of 1833, associate professor at the University of Zurich from the date of its creation. Simultaneously, also he was professor of the Obere Industrieschule.

Gräffe is known for having been the first to enunciate a method to approximate the roots of any polynomial, a method known today as the Dandelin-Gräffe method.

== Bibliography ==
- Burckhardt, Johann Jakob (1964). "Gräffe, Karl Heinrich, mathematiker". Neue deutsche Biographie (in German). Gaál – Grasmann.
- Frei, Günther; Stammbach, Urs (1994). Die Mathematiker an den Zürcher Hochschulen (in German). Springer. ISBN 978-3-7643-5078-9.
- Ostrowski, Alexandre (1940). "Recherches sur la méthode de Graeffe et les zéros des polynomes et des séries de Laurent". Acta Mathematica (in French). 72 (1): 157–257. doi:10.1007/BF02546330. ISSN 0001-5962.
