= Arend Friedrich Wiegmann =

German pharmacist and botanist

Arend Joachim Friedrich Wiegmann (30 March 1770 – 12 March 1853) was a German pharmacist and botanist born in Hadersleben, Duchy of Schleswig. He was the father of zoologist Arend Friedrich August Wiegmann (1802-1841).

Originally an apprentice pharmacist to his uncle in Braunschweig, he spent the following years working in several pharmacies in Germany and Switzerland. Following the death of his uncle in 1796, he inherited the Braunschweig pharmacy, serving as its manager until 1820. In 1821 he became a lecturer of natural sciences at the Collegium Carolinum in Braunschweig, later receiving the title of professor (1832).

In 1839 he published a manual on phytopathology called Die Krankheiten und krankhaften Missbildungen der Gewachse. He was the author of a treatise involving the origins, formation and nature of peat, titled Über die Entstehung, Bildung und das Wesen des Torfes. In 1842 he and L. Polstorff wrote on plant constituents that are not organic: Ũber die anorganischen Bestandteiele der Pflanzen.

In 1832, Franz Julius Ferdinand Meyen named the plant genus Wiegmannia in his son's honor.
