= Gottlieb Elster =

German sculptor (1867–1917)

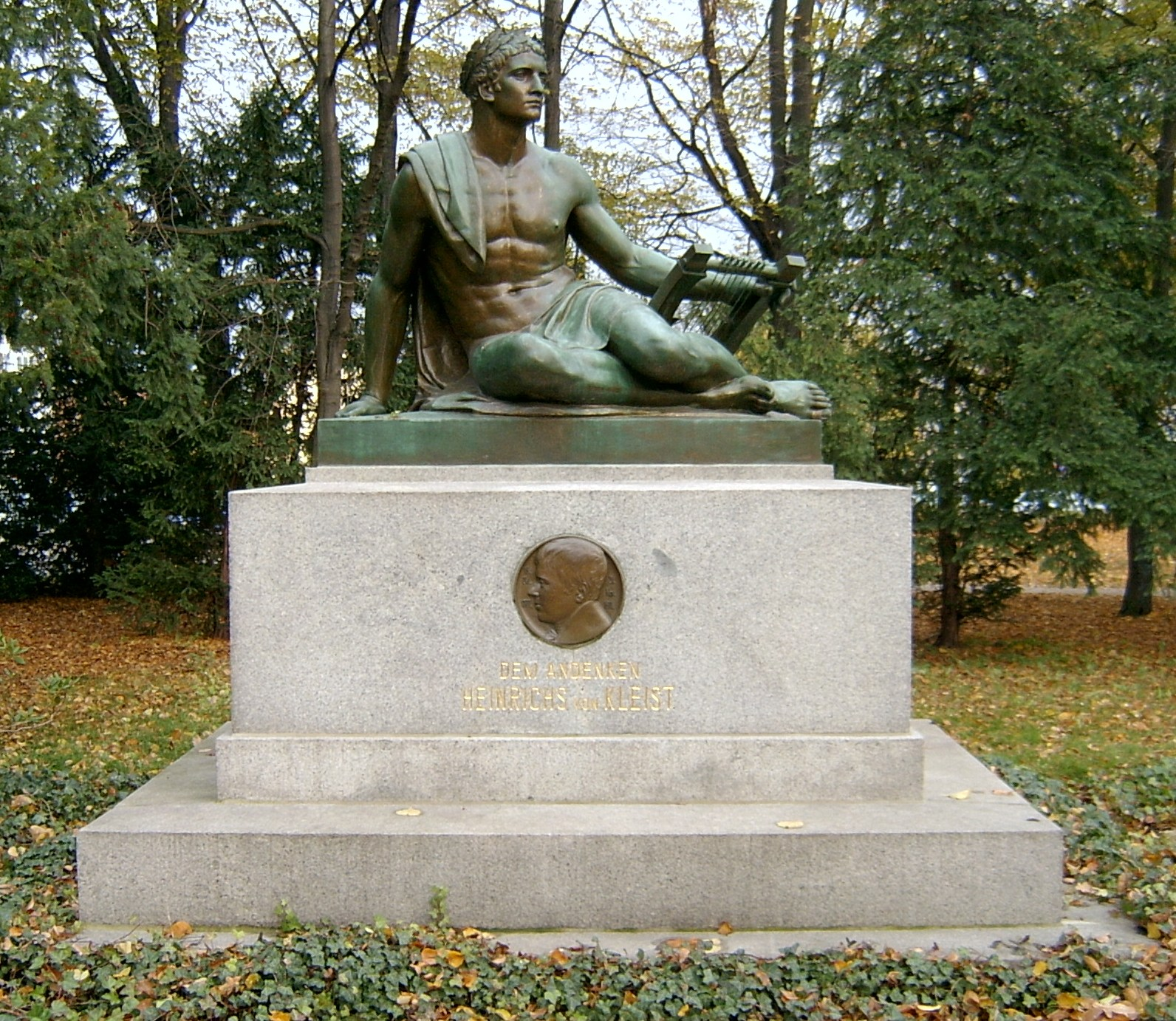
Kleist Monument in Frankfurt (Oder)

Gottlieb Elster (8 October 1867 – 6 December 1917) was a German sculptor.

== Life ==
Elster was born in Kreiensen on 8 October 1867. He studied at the Braunschweig University of Technology from 1888 to 1891, later attending the Academy of Fine Arts, Munich. He then went to Berlin, where he studied under Otto Lessing, Fritz Schaper and, until 1905, worked with Adolf Brütt. He maintained a private studio during most of these years. In 1910, he became Brütt's successor as Director of the Weimar Sculpture School and their foundry. He returned to Braunschweig in 1913 and remained there until his death.

== Selected major works ==
- 1903: Statue of Frederick the Great in his youth at the Marketplace in Rheinsberg. (placed in storage by the East German government in 1950; reinstalled in 1995)
- 1910: Monument of Heinrich von Kleist in the Kleistpark, Frankfurt (Oder).
- 1911: Seated sculpture of Queen Louise, in the Trianon-Park, Berlin-Weißen See.
- A soldier kneeling to honor his fallen comrades of the Hannoverian Rifle Battalion #10, completed by Hans Lehmann-Borges (1879–1945), in Goslar.

In 1909, he received one of the five prizes given in a competition to create the monument for Fritz Reuter in Stavenhagen, but the contract was eventually awarded to Wilhelm Wandschneider.
