= Gerd Wedler =

German chemist (1929–2008)

Gerd Wedler (19 August 1929 in Braunschweig, Germany – 13 September 2008 in Erlangen, Germany) was a German chemist.

== Life ==
After graduating from high school in 1949 in his native city of Brunswick, Wedler began his studies in chemistry at the Braunschweig University of Technology. With his thesis "On the mechanism of decay formic acid on nickel contact", he laid the foundations for the exploration of the primary steps of the heterogeneous catalysis. In 1966, he took a chair at the University of Erlangen-Nuremberg and was appointed full professor at the Institute for Physical and Theoretical Chemistry.

== Work ==
Gerd Wedler was co-founder of a group of researchers and a special research department of the German Research Foundation at the University of Erlangen-Nuremberg and Dean of the Faculty of Natural Sciences II. His work area included the investigation of the adsorption and Response behavior of small Molecule on model catalysts.

For his work in this area, he was awarded the Bunsen Denkmünze by the German Bunsen Society for Physical Chemistry in 1996. Its scientific findings are available in more than 200 publications. His "Textbook of Physical Chemistry" appears now in its fifth edition in Germany and is a standard work of the Physical Chemistry. After retirement, he continued to devote part of his time to updating this standard work.
