= Theodor Engelbrecht =

German physician

Theodor Elias August Benjamin Engelbrecht (18 January 1813 – 4 August 1892) was a German physician and pomologist.

== Biography ==
He was born in Halchter near Braunschweig. He studied medicine at the University of Göttingen, and in 1844 was named a professor at the Surgical-Anatomical Institute in Braunschweig. In 1861 he received the post of medical officer of the Ducal Medical College. In 1862 he induced the government to establish the Pomological Institute, and he was the first president of the German Pomological Society (1880–89). His principal work is Deutschland's Aepfelsorten ("Germany's apple varieties", 1889).
