= Jakob Mauvillon =

German 18th-century philosopher and politico-economic theoretician

Jakob Mauvillon (8 March 1743 – 11 January 1794), son of Eleazar Mauvillon, was an 18th-century figure in German liberalism.

He was born in Leipzig of French Huguenot descent. He was a professor of politics at Brunswick. He advocated a radical laissez-faire philosophy, which included proposals for the privatisation of all the schools and the postal system, to be funded privately rather than by taxes. He speculated that the security functions of the state might also be voluntarily funded.

Besides advocating laissez-faire in economic matters he also "expresses a radical libertarianism that centers on freedom of the press and expression" as revealed in a letter to the librarian of the Herzog August Bibliothek in Wolfenbüttel, Ernst Theodor Langer. He said he thinks that "the real barbarians are those who put obstacles in the way of press freedom, and hinder research in theology, philosophy and politics; in short, those who issue decrees about censorship, edicts about religion and who forbid people to read or to think." He died in Braunschweig.

Mauvillon was a mentor to the French liberal Benjamin Constant.
