= August Wilhelm Knoch =

German naturalist (1742–1818)

August Wilhelm Knoch (June 8, 1742 – June 2, 1818) was a German naturalist born in Braunschweig. He was a professor of physics at Collegium Carolinum.

He studied theology at the University of Leipzig. In 1775 he was hired as a caretaker at the Collegium Carolinum, during which time his interests turned to natural sciences. In 1789 he became a professor of physics.

He was the author of the following works in entomology:

- Beyträge zur Insektengeschichte Leipzig (Schwickert). three volumes 1781, 1782, 1783.
- Neue Beyträge zur Insectenkunde Leipzig (Schwickert) 1801.
