= Heinrich Emil Timerding =

German mathematician

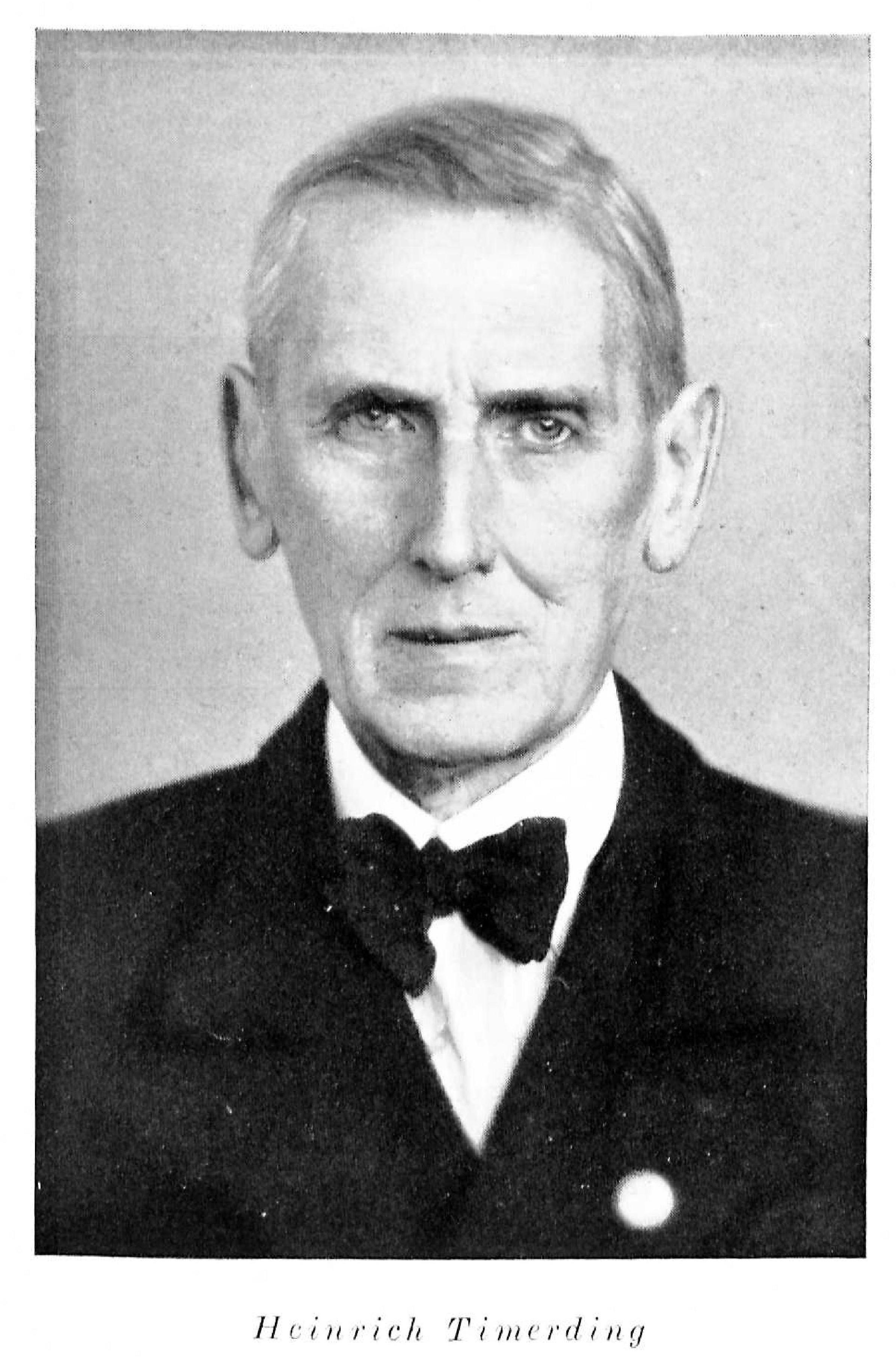

Heinrich Carl Franz Emil Timerding (23 January 1873 in Strasbourg – 30 April 1945 in Braunschweig) was a German mathematician, professor at the Braunschweig University of Technology, mainly known for his contributions to probability theory. He was awarded the Brunswick and the Prussian War Merit Cross, the Ritterkreuz (Knight's Cross) of the Order of Henry the Lion, and in 1938 the Nazi Civil Service Faithful Service Medal.

In 1900 he attended Columbia University in New York City the American Mathematical Society's summer meeting, where he read a paper.

== Main publications ==
- Über die Kugeln, welche eine cubische Raumcurve mehrfach oder mehrpunktig berühren. R. Schultz & co, Strassburg 1894
- Geometrie der Kräfte, Teubner, Leipzig 1908
- Die Erziehung der Anschauung, Teubner, Leipzig, 1912
- Handbuch der angewandten Mathematik Vol. 1. Praktische Analysis. Vol. 2. Darstellende Geometrie., Teubner 1914
- Analyse des Zufalls, 1915
- Der goldene Schnitt, 1919
- Robert Mayer und die Entdeckung des Energiegesetzes, 1925.
