= List of Eintracht Braunschweig seasons =

This is a list of seasons played by Eintracht Braunschweig in German and European football, from their first competitive to the most recent completed season. It details the club's achievements in every competition, as well as the club's average attendance and top scorers for each season since 1947–48. Players in bold were also top scorers in their league that season.

== Seasons ==
=== 1904–1933 ===
Year	Division	Position	NC	GC
1904–05	1. Spielklasse Herzogtum Braunschweig (I)	1st	NP	QF
1905–06	1. Spielklasse Bezirk Braunschweig (I)	1st	RU	
1906–07	1. Spielklasse Bezirk Braunschweig (I)	1st	RU	
1907–08	1. Spielklasse Bezirk Braunschweig (I)	1st	W	QF
1908–09	1. Spielklasse Bezirk Braunschweig (I)	1st	RU	
1909–10	1. Spielklasse Bezirk Braunschweig (I)	1st	SF	
1910–11	1. Spielklasse Bezirk Braunschweig (I)	1st	RU	
1911–12	1. Spielklasse Bezirk Braunschweig (I)	1st	RU	
1912–13	1. Spielklasse Bezirk Braunschweig (I)	1st	W	DNE
1913–14	Verbandsliga Norddeutschland (I)	5th	NP	
No championship played in 1914–15 (Note: Due to the outbreak of World War I the 1914–15 season was cancelled. Eintracht Braunschweig won a local cup competition staged instead in 1915. From 1915–16 on league play reassumed in a limited fashion until the end of the war.)
1915–16	Bezirksmeisterschaft Braunschweig (I)	1st	QF	NP
1916–17	Bezirksmeisterschaft Braunschweig (I)	1st	SF	NP
1917–18	Bezirksmeisterschaft Braunschweig (I)	1st	QR	NP
1918–19	Bezirksmeisterschaft Braunschweig (I)	2nd		NP
1919–20	Bezirksmeisterschaft Braunschweig (I)	1st	QF	
1920–21	Südkreisliga (I)	6th		
1921–22	Südkreisliga (I)	2nd		
1922–23	Südkreisliga, Staffel 2 (I)	2nd		
1923–24	Südkreisliga, Staffel 2 (I)	1st (Note: Won championship play-off against Staffel 1 winners SV Arminia Hannover 6–2.)	RU	
1924–25	Bezirksliga Südhannover/Braunschweig, Staffel 2 (I)	1st (Note: Won championship play-off against Staffel 1 winners SV Arminia Hannover 1–0.)	5th	
1925–26	Bezirksliga Südhannover/Braunschweig, Staffel 2 (I)	2nd		
1926–27	Bezirksliga Südhannover/Braunschweig, Staffel 2 (I)	1st (Note: Lost championship play-off against Staffel 1 winners Hannover 96 0–2.)	QR	
1927–28	Bezirksliga Südhannover/Braunschweig, Staffel 2 (I)	3rd		
No championship played in 1928–29 (Note: In 1928–29 no regular league matches were played in Northern Germany due to a conflict between the clubs and the Northern German FA. Some major clubs demanded the creation of a single, unified top level league in Northern Germany, while smaller clubs feared to be left out. While some of the big Hamburg and Schleswig-Holstein clubs, including Hamburger SV, Holstein Kiel, and Altona 93, formed a rebel league, most clubs in the Southern parts of Northern Germany sat out the season. In the end six Northern German Oberligas were formed as a compromise for the 1929–30 season.)
1929–30	Oberliga Südhannover/Braunschweig (I)	5th		
1930–31	Oberliga Südhannover/Braunschweig (I)	2nd	R16	
1931–32	Oberliga Südhannover/Braunschweig (I)	2nd	GS	
1932–33	Oberliga Südhannover/Braunschweig (I)	6th		

=== 1933–1945 ===
Year	Division	Position	GC	Cup
1933–34	Gauliga Niedersachsen (I)	5th		NP
1934–35	Gauliga Niedersachsen (I)	4th		R16
1935–36	Gauliga Niedersachsen (I)	4th		
1936–37	Gauliga Niedersachsen (I)	6th		R16
1937–38	Gauliga Niedersachsen (I)	4th		
1938–39	Gauliga Niedersachsen (I)	3rd		
1939–40	Gauliga Niedersachsen, Gruppe Süd (I)	2nd		
1940–41	Gauliga Niedersachsen, Gruppe Süd (I)	2nd		R64
1941–42	Gauliga Niedersachsen, Gruppe Süd (I)	1st		
1941–42	Gauliga Niedersachsen, Championship round (I)	3rd		R64
1942–43	Gauliga Südhannover-Braunschweig (I)	1st	R16	R32
1943–44	Gauliga Südhannover-Braunschweig (I)	1st	R32	NP
1944–45	Stadtliga Braunschweig (I)	NF (Note: Due to World War II the 1944–45 season was abandoned.)	NP	NP

=== 1945–1963 ===
Year	Division	Position	Attendance ⌀	**Top goalscorer(s)** (Note: League and German championship play-off only.)	**GC**	**Cup** (Note: The first post-WWII edition of the German cup was held in 1952–53. During the 1950s and 1960s the number of teams participating in the national stages varied between 32 and as little as 4 clubs. Teams qualified in regional stages for the national final rounds. Not until the foundation of the Bundesliga in 1963 first division clubs qualified automatically for the German cup.)	**Other**
1945–46	Oberliga Niedersachsen-Süd (I)	1st			NP	NP	NC QF (Note: Championship eventually abandoned.)
1946–47	Oberliga Niedersachsen-Süd (I)	1st (Note: Lost two-legged Lower Saxony championship play-off against Staffel Nord winners SV Werder Bremen 3–1 and 0–3.)			NP	NP	ZOC QF
1947–48	Oberliga Nord (I)	3rd	14,272	(Allied-occupied Germany) Walter Schemel 13		NP	ZOC 4th
1948–49	Oberliga Nord (I)	4th	12,818	(Allied-occupied Germany) Walter Schemel 14		NP	
1949–50	Oberliga Nord (I)	5th	11,400	(West Germany) Walter Schemel 17		NP	
1950–51	Oberliga Nord (I)	10th	9,562	(West Germany) Werner Thamm 16		NP	
1951–52	Oberliga Nord (I)	14th	10,020	(West Germany) Bernhardt Hirschberg 9		NP	
1952–53	Amateurliga Niedersachsen-Ost (II)	1st	6,000	(West Germany) Werner Oberländer 23		R32	Promotion play-off W
1953–54	Oberliga Nord (I)	4th	15,153	(West Germany) Winfried Herz 13		RS	
1954–55	Oberliga Nord (I)	6th	12,133	(West Germany) Werner Thamm 12		R32	
1955–56	Oberliga Nord (I)	11th	10,066	(West Germany) Winfried Herz 17		RS	
1956–57	Oberliga Nord (I)	7th	10,026	(West Germany) Heinz Wozniakowski 14		RS	
1957–58	Oberliga Nord (I)	2nd	11,800	(West Germany) Ernst-Otto Meyer 24, (West Germany) **Werner Thamm** 24	GS	RS	
1958–59	Oberliga Nord (I)	5th	9,200	(West Germany) Werner Thamm 20		RS	
1959–60	Oberliga Nord (I)	8th	10,733	(West Germany) Werner Thamm 10		RS	
1960–61	Oberliga Nord (I)	9th	5,933	(West Germany) Werner Thamm 12		RS	
1961–62	Oberliga Nord (I)	6th	9,566	(West Germany) Jürgen Moll 26		R16	
1962–63	Oberliga Nord (I)	3rd	9,733	(West Germany) Jürgen Moll 23		RS	

=== Since 1963 ===
Year	Division	Position	Attendance ⌀	**Top goalscorer(s)** (Note: League only.)	**Cup**	**Europe**	**Other**
1963–64	Bundesliga (I)	11th	19,606	(West Germany) Jürgen Moll 8, (West Germany) Manfred Wuttich 8	R16		
1964–65	Bundesliga (I)	9th	18,792	(West Germany) Lothar Ulsaß 12	QF		Intertoto Cup GS 3rd
1965–66	Bundesliga (I)	10th	14,540	(West Germany) Lothar Ulsaß 17	R32		Intertoto Cup GS 3rd
1966–67	Bundesliga (I)	1st	25,270	(West Germany) Lothar Ulsaß 14	R32		Intertoto Cup GS 2nd
1967–68	Bundesliga (I)	9th	14,427	(West Germany) Lothar Ulsaß 10	QF	EC QF	
1968–69	Bundesliga (I)	4th	15,230	(West Germany) Hartmut Weiß 15	R16		Intertoto Cup GS W
1969–70	Bundesliga (I)	16th	14,308	(West Germany) Erich Maas 9	R32		
1970–71	Bundesliga (I)	4th	17,344	(West Germany) Lothar Ulsaß 18	R32		Intertoto Cup GS W
1971–72	Bundesliga (I)	12th	12,118	(West Germany) Ludwig Bründl 10	R16	UC R16	Intertoto Cup GS W
1972–73	Bundesliga (I)	17th	13,667	(West Germany) Ludwig Bründl 9, (West Germany) Bernd Gersdorff 9	QF		Ligapokal QF, Intertoto Cup GS W
1973–74	Regionalliga Nord (II)	1st	9,566	(West Germany) **Bernd Gersdorff** 35	R32		Promotion play-off W, Intertoto Cup GS 3rd
1974–75	Bundesliga (I)	9th	17,788	(West Germany) Bernd Gersdorff 15	R32		
1975–76	Bundesliga (I)	5th	22,604	(West Germany) Wolfgang Frank 16	R16		Intertoto Cup GS W
1976–77	Bundesliga (I)	3rd	19,743	(West Germany) Wolfgang Frank 24	R64	UC R32	Intertoto Cup GS 3rd
1977–78	Bundesliga (I)	13th	17,578	(West Germany) Paul Breitner 10	R16	UC R16	
1978–79	Bundesliga (I)	9th	16,311	(West Germany) Harald Nickel 16	R32		Intertoto Cup GS W
1979–80	Bundesliga (I)	18th	13,229	(West Germany) Ronnie Worm 8	R32		Intertoto Cup GS W
1980–81	2. Bundesliga Nord (II)	2nd	10,714	(West Germany) Ronnie Worm 30	SF		Promotion play-off W
1981–82	Bundesliga (I)	11th	18,405	(West Germany) Ronnie Worm 17	R128		
1982–83	Bundesliga (I)	15th	13,954	(West Germany) Günter Keute 7, (Socialist Federal Republic of Yugoslavia) Ilija Zavišić 7	R16		
1983–84	Bundesliga (I)	9th	14,470	(West Germany) Peter Lux 8, (West Germany) Ronnie Worm 8	R16		Intertoto Cup GS 2nd
1984–85	Bundesliga (I)	18th	12,883	(West Germany) Ronnie Worm 10	R64		Intertoto Cup GS 3rd
1985–86	2. Bundesliga (II)	12th	5,584	(West Germany) Frank Plagge 13	R64		Intertoto Cup GS 3rd
1986–87	2. Bundesliga (II)	17th	7,288	(West Germany) Bernd Buchheister 14	R64		
1987–88	Oberliga Nord (III)	1st	6,759	(West Germany) Olaf Schmäler 13	R64		Promotion play-off RU, Lower Saxony Cup 2nd round
1988–89	2. Bundesliga (II)	9th	9,140	(West Germany) Bernd Buchheister 8	R64		
1989–90	2. Bundesliga (II)	7th	10,555	(West Germany) Bernd Buchheister 13	SF		
1990–91	2. Bundesliga (II)	13th	6,748	(Germany) Holger Aden 14	R32		
1991–92	2. Bundesliga Nord (II)	7th	5,623	(Germany) Holger Aden 13	R128		
1992–93	2. Bundesliga (II)	19th	7,304	(Germany) Holger Aden 19	R32		
1993–94	Oberliga Nord (III)	2nd	4,561	(Germany) Stefan Meissner 14	R32		Promotion play-off RU
1994–95	Regionalliga Nord (III)	6th	4,351	(Ukraine) Viktor Pasulko 8			Lower Saxony Cup 2nd round
1995–96	Regionalliga Nord (III)	2nd	4,811	(Turkey) Özkan Koçtürk 14			Lower Saxony Cup SF
1996–97	Regionalliga Nord (III)	2nd	5,972	(Serbia and Montenegro) Miloš Kolaković 19			Lower Saxony Cup 1st round
1997–98	Regionalliga Nord (III)	2nd	9,181	(Serbia and Montenegro) Miloš Kolaković 18			Lower Saxony Cup 1st round
1998–99	Regionalliga Nord (III)	3rd	7,456	(Germany) René Deffke 10			Lower Saxony Cup RU
1999–2000	Regionalliga Nord (III)	3rd	8,048	(Germany) Dirk Weetendorf 13			Lower Saxony Cup 1st round
2000–01	Regionalliga Nord (III)	8th	10,597	(Germany) Dirk Weetendorf 16			Lower Saxony Cup QF
2001–02	Regionalliga Nord (III)	2nd	11,922	(Brazil) **Daniel Teixeira** 19			Lower Saxony Cup SF
2002–03	2. Bundesliga (II)	15th	14,593	(Nigeria) Sambo Choji 8	R64		
2003–04	Regionalliga Nord (III)	6th	10,635	(Democratic Republic of the Congo) Michél Mazingu-Dinzey 13	R16		Lower Saxony Cup W
2004–05	Regionalliga Nord (III)	1st	13,617	(Turkey) **Ahmet Kuru** 24	R16		Lower Saxony Cup QF
2005–06	2. Bundesliga (II)	12th	18,165	(Germany) Patrick Bick 8	R32		
2006–07	2. Bundesliga (II)	18th	15,671	(Cameroon) Valentine Atem 3, (Germany) Jürgen Rische 3, (Germany) Tobias Schweinsteiger 3	R64		
2007–08	Regionalliga Nord (III)	10th	14,889	(Germany) Lars Fuchs 10	R64		Lower Saxony Cup SF
2008–09	3. Liga (III)	13th	13,273	(Nigeria) Kingsley Onuegbu 7			Lower Saxony Cup RU
2009–10	3. Liga (III)	4th	12,776	(Germany) Dennis Kruppke 15	R64		Lower Saxony Cup 3rd place
2010–11	3. Liga (III)	1st	17,425	(Democratic Republic of the Congo) **Domi Kumbela** 19	R64		Lower Saxony Cup W
2011–12	2. Bundesliga (II)	8th	21,278	(Germany) Dennis Kruppke 10, (Democratic Republic of the Congo) Domi Kumbela 10	R64		
2012–13	2. Bundesliga (II)	2nd	20,454	(Democratic Republic of the Congo) **Domi Kumbela** 19	R32		
2013–14	Bundesliga (I)	18th	22,799	(Democratic Republic of the Congo) Domi Kumbela 9	R64		
2014–15	2. Bundesliga (II)	6th	21,609	(Norway) Håvard Nielsen 8	R16		
2015–16	2. Bundesliga (II)	8th	21,191	(Switzerland) Salim Khelifi 8	R16		
2016–17	2. Bundesliga (II)	3rd	21,430	(Democratic Republic of the Congo) Domi Kumbela 13	R64		Lost promotion play-off
2017–18	2. Bundesliga (II)	17th	20,545	(Nigeria) Suleiman Abdullahi 20	R64		
2018–19	3. Liga (III)	16th	18,047	(Germany) Philipp Hofmann 11	R64		Lower Saxony Cup QF
2019–20	3. Liga (III)	3rd	13,600	(Germany) Martin Kobylański 18			Lower Saxony Cup SF
2020–21	2. Bundesliga (II)	17th	10,950	(Germany) Nick Proschwitz 7	R32		
2021–22	3. Liga (III)	2nd	9,024	(Germany) Lion Lauberbach 12	R64		Lower Saxony Cup QF
2022–23	2. Bundesliga (II)	15th	19,308	(Germany) Anthony Ujah 10	R32		
2023–24	2. Bundesliga (II)	15th	20,692	(France) Rayan Philippe 8	R64		
2024–25	2. Bundesliga (II)	16th	21,080	(France) Rayan Philippe 13	R64		
2025–26	2. Bundesliga (II)	15th	21,085	(Germany) Mehmet-Can Aydın, (Turkey) Erencan Yardımcı 5	R64		

== Key ==
- (I) = 1st division
- (II) = 2nd division
- (III) = 3rd division
- NF = Season not finished
- NP = Competition not played this season
- DNE = Did not enter
- GC = German championship
- NC = Northern German championship
- ZOC = British Zone of Occupation championship
- EC = European Cup
- UC = UEFA Cup
- Attendance ⌀ = Average attendance

- RS = Regional stages of the German cup
- QR = Qualification round
- GS = Group stage
- R128 = Round of 128
- R64 = Round of 64
- R32 = Round of 32
- R16 = Round of 16
- QF = Quarter-finals
- SF = Semi-finals
- RU = Runners-up
- W = Winners

== Sources ==
- Eintracht Braunschweig at Fußballdaten.de (in German)
- Bläsig, Horst/Leppert, Alex (2010). Ein Roter Löwe auf der Brust - Die Geschichte von Eintracht Braunschweig. Göttingen: Die Werkstatt. ISBN 978-3-89533-675-1.
- Peters, Stefan (1998). Eintracht Braunschweig. Die Chronik. Kassel: Agon-Sportverlag. ISBN 978-3-89609-152-9.
- Peters, Stefan/Göttner, Christian (2013). 100 Spiele Eintracht. Die emotionalsten Partien der Vereinsgeschichte von Eintracht Braunschweig. Göttingen: Die Werkstatt. ISBN 978-3-7307-0052-5.
