= 1909–10 Brunswick football championship =

The sixth Brunswick football championship was held in 1909–10 and was organized by the Northern German Football Association. Eintracht Braunschweig won the championship and qualified for the 1909–10 Northern German Football Championship. There, the club defeated Hannover 96 in the quarter-finals and lost to SV Werder Bremen in the semi-finals.

Eintracht Braunschweig II withdrew from the competition.

== Final results ==
Place	Club	Wed.	W	D	L	Balance	Pts
1.	FC Eintracht Braunschweig	2	2	0	0	14:2	4:0
2.	BV Wacker 06 Braunschweig	2	1	0	1	3:3	6:6
3.	FV 05 Braunschweig	2	0	0	2	2:14	0:4
