= List of unrelegated association football clubs =

Several association football clubs succeed in playing at the highest level of their domestic league without being relegated for several years, if at all. This page lists the clubs that managed to stay in top flight for an extended period of time, and those that have never been relegated from their current top-tier league.

== Historical considerations ==
More often than not, football clubs have played in more than one top-tier competition. It is therefore possible that teams were relegated at one point in their history, but have not been relegated in the competition in which they currently compete. This is the case for multiple teams in countries where football was played in regional leagues prior to the creation of a unified national league. In such countries, a national champion was previously declared by means of a play-off tournament between teams that qualified through their regional tournaments. In Germany, for instance, seven teams have never been relegated from the 1963-established Bundesliga (which was originally the top flight of West Germany only), including some joining in the 1990s following German reunification, but three of them found themselves expelled from the older Oberligen. Hamburger SV played continuously in the top tier of the German football system from the end of World War I until 2018. In the Netherlands, football used to be organised in regional competitions as well. The unified Eredivisie was born in 1956, and four teams have continuously played at this highest national level since then.

Even before the establishment of regional competitions, football was played in league systems. The very first football championships in Europe were often organised on a local level. Taking these smaller competitions into account, FK Austria Wien and SK Rapid Wien can claim to have played at the highest possible level since competition began in Austria in 1911. At that time however, the only organised football was played in the league of Lower Austria, which was then located in the Austro-Hungarian Empire, and only teams from Vienna took part. After the Anschluss of Austria and Nazi Germany in 1938, Austrian teams competed in the German football system for several years, which made it possible for Rapid Wien to become German champion in 1941. The current Austrian Bundesliga was only established in 1974, and to this point a total of five teams have never been relegated from that competition.

In Greece and Turkey, competitive football was organised in even smaller leagues. In both countries, single-city leagues were the highest level for quite some time. In 1959, a unified Hellenic league was founded, and Olympiacos, Panathinaikos and PAOK have played in every season of it. However, there was a Panhellenic Championship from 1927 to 1959, a top tier that connected the city leagues, and titles won in that are considered valid and equal to the modern league by the Hellenic Football Federation. Turkish clubs Beşiktaş, Fenerbahçe and Galatasaray were in the Istanbul Football League before the unified Turkish league was founded in 1959, but there was no clear and undisputed top flight akin to the Panhellenic Championship; the Turkish Football Federation does not recognise pre-1956 titles such as those of the Turkish National Division, while the recognised Turkish Federation Cup from 1956 to 1958 was a knockout competition.

In Russia, football was also first played at city level. The St. Petersburg Football League was established in 1901, and its Muscovite counterpart followed in 1909. Many years later, in 1936, the Soviet Top League was formed. This competition ceased to exist with the dissolution of the Soviet Union, whereupon new national leagues formed in the fifteen successor states. As a result, many teams entered a top division for the first time in their history. In Estonia, for example, the new Meistriliiga was composed of clubs that never participated in the top flight of Soviet Union football. As these are relatively new competitions, many clubs can claim to have never been relegated from the top level, but only FC Dynamo Kyiv in Ukraine and FC Dinamo Tbilisi in Georgia have always played at the highest possible level. On the other hand, FC Dynamo Moscow played in every season of the Soviet Top League but was relegated from the Russian Premier League in the 2015–16 season.

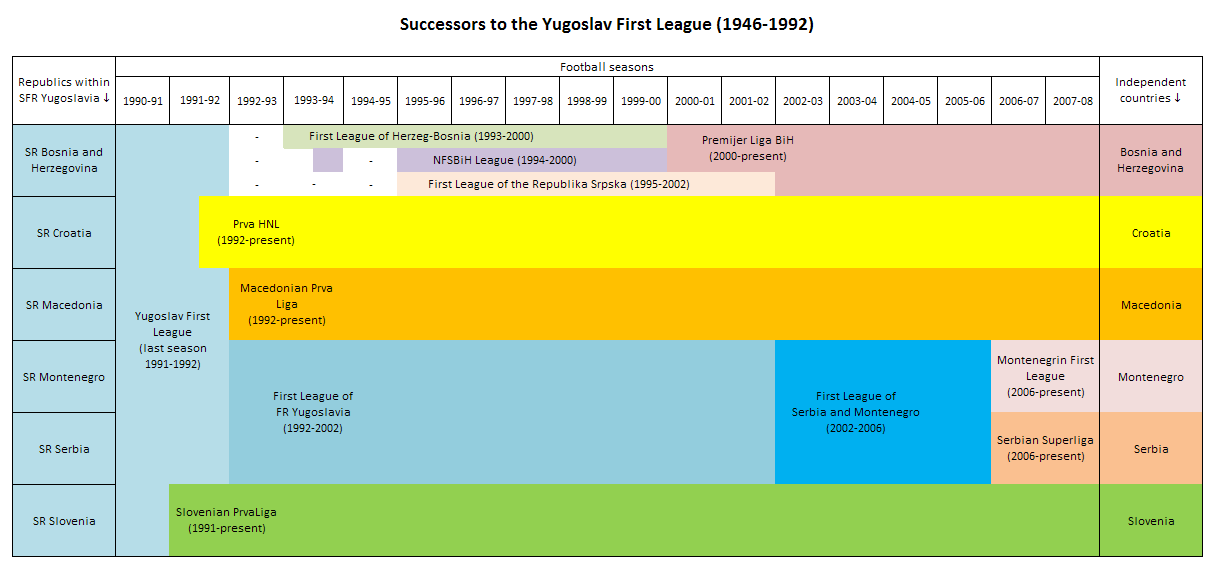
Timeline chart showing Yugoslav First League successors

Besides the Soviet, the Czechoslovak and Yugoslav football leagues also split into multiple competitions in the early 1990s. A total of eight teams have not been relegated from the national championships of the Czech Republic and Slovakia, but no team managed to achieve this in Czechoslovak times. In Bosnia and Herzegovina, football became divided alongside ethnic lines and competition was held in three different leagues, before the establishment of a national division in 2000. In Kosovo, a national league also exists, although it was not recognised by UEFA or FIFA until 2016. In all, three clubs – Red Star Belgrade, Partizan Belgrade and Dinamo Zagreb – have played at the highest level since the creation of socialist Yugoslavia, whilst Hajduk Split have never been relegated since they first played in the championship of the now long gone Kingdom of Serbs, Croats and Slovenes.

In many instances, new top-tier leagues were created to replace existing national championships. In England, six teams have been present in every season of the Premier League, which was founded in 1992. Thus, a great number of teams can claim to have never been relegated from newer competitions. In Northern Ireland, the teams of Cliftonville, Glentoran and Linfield have played at the top-tier for 135 years, but another five have been present in every season of the NIFL Premiership, which was established in 2008.

In Scotland, Aberdeen and Celtic have never been relegated. Until 2012 Rangers had participated in every top-tier season since 1890, but were removed and admitted to the fourth tier of Scottish football amid a financial crisis (climbing back to the top by 2016), so do not have an unbroken run but have never been relegated due to on-field performance, remaining the only Scottish club to never finish below 6th. This contrasts with Celtic and Aberdeen, remaining at the top continuously despite the former finishing below 6th seven times and the latter finishing bottom twice. Aberdeen was relegated at the end of the 1999/2000 season for a matter of weeks but was re-elected due to Falkirk's ground not being suitable at the time.

Many leagues have been running for a long time. Unsurprisingly, fewer clubs manage to stay on top the longer a competition runs. The Spanish Primera División was born in 1929, and only Athletic Bilbao, FC Barcelona and Real Madrid have been present ever since. The same year the Italian Serie A became a round-robin tournament, Inter Milan became the only club to have continuously played at the highest level from that moment forward – even doing so since 1909 (though Juventus FC, since its debut in the top-tier league in 1900, only ever spent a single season outside of it due to an administrative decision in 2006). Out of the FIFA World Cup-winning nations, France is the only one that has no unrelegated clubs from the current top-tier league, despite the latter having existed since 1930 (though Paris Saint-Germain, since its creation in 1970, was only ever relegated from Ligue 1 due to an administrative decision in 1972). Similarly, no team that plays in the Swiss Super League – established in 1897 – has not been relegated at one point in their history.

== Unrelegated for 75 years ==
This table lists all clubs that have continuously played at the highest level for 75 years or more. Taken into account are all the leagues that formed the highest level at the time each club played in them. Competitions that were organised on sub-regional levels are excluded though. This is the reason no clubs from Turkey are listed, as football was played in city-level competitions up until 1959, with national competitions that preceded that time having their champions unrecognised today.

The large number of Brazilian football clubs on this list can be explained by the fact that these clubs were dominant in the relatively small state leagues, which formed the highest tier of competition in Brazil for more than half a century. The Taça Brasil, which existed between 1959 and 1968, is not considered a top-tier tournament for the purpose of this list, as it was a knockout competition between the different state champions, and no team took part in every edition.

As of 2025, the majority of the teams listed below continue to play at the top, although a few have ended their uninterrupted spell. Some teams had been relegated (and promoted back) before the start of their record spell.

The clubs in bold have ongoing spells playing in their respective top-flight divisions.

Overview of unrelegated association football clubs with spans of 75 years or more
| Club | First year of spell | Last year of spell | Duration (years) | Competition(s) |
|---|---|---|---|---|
| (Scotland) **Celtic** | 1890 | – | 136 | Football League, Premier League & Premiership (130 seasons) |
| (Northern Ireland) **Cliftonville** | 1890 | – | 136 | Football League, Premier League & NIFL Premiership (126 seasons) |
| (Northern Ireland) **Glentoran** | 1890 | – | 136 | Football League, Premier League & NIFL Premiership (126 seasons) |
| (Northern Ireland) **Linfield** | 1890 | – | 136 | Football League, Premier League & NIFL Premiership (126 seasons) |
| (Scotland) Rangers (Note: Never relegated based on performance. Finished second but admitted to the fourth tier due to a financial crisis.) | 1890 | 2012 | 122 | Football League & Premier League (115 seasons) |
| (Northern Ireland) Lisburn Distillery | 1890 | 1995 | 105 | Football League (94 seasons) |
| (Scotland) Heart of Midlothian | 1890 | 1977 | 87 | Football League (80 seasons) |
| (Germany) Eintracht Frankfurt | 1899 | 1996 | 97 | Kreisliga Nordmain, Bezirksliga Main, Bezirksliga Main-Hessen, Gauliga Südwest/Mainhessen, Oberliga Süd & Bundesliga (95 seasons) |
| (Germany) Werder Bremen | 1899 | 1980 | 81 | Verband Bremer Fussballveriene, Bezirk Bremen, Northern German football championship, Gauliga Niedersachsen, Oberliga Nord & Bundesliga |
| (Uruguay) **Peñarol** (Note: There is dispute as to whether Peñarol is a direct continuation of CURCC, which was founded in 1900, or is a separate club founded in 1913.) | 1900 | – | 126 | Primera División (123 seasons) |
| (Italy) Juventus (Note: Never relegated based on performance. They were relegated to Serie B due to the Calciopoli scandal despite initially finishing first.) | 1900 | 2006 | 106 | Italian Football Championship (101 seasons) |
| (Switzerland) Servette | 1900 | 2005 | 105 | Swiss Serie A, Nationalliga, Nationalliga A & Swiss Super League (105 seasons) |
| (Italy) AC Milan (Note: Withdrew from the 1908 Italian Championship. The relegation of 1980 was for the Totonero scandal despite initially finishing third, though they were relegated from Serie A based on performance in 1982.) | 1900 | 1980 | 80 | Italian Football Championship (75 seasons) |
| (Uruguay) **Nacional** | 1901 | – | 125 | Primera División (122 seasons) |
| (Hungary) Ferencváros | 1901 | 2006 | 105 | Nemzeti Bajnokság (102 seasons) |
| (Scotland) **Aberdeen** (Note: Absent from 1917 to 1919.) | 1905 | – | 121 | Football League, Premier League & Premiership (114 seasons) |
| (Paraguay) **Guaraní** | 1906 | – | 120 | Primera División (115 seasons) |
| (Paraguay) **Olimpia** | 1906 | – | 120 | Primera División (115 seasons) |
| (Brazil) Botafogo | 1906 | 2002 | 96 | Campeonato Carioca |
| (Paraguay) Club Libertad | 1906 | 1998 | 92 | Primera División (87 seasons) |
| (Brazil) Fluminense | 1906 | 1997 | 91 | Campeonato Carioca |
| (Brazil) Atlético Mineiro | 1908 | 2005 | 97 | Campeonato Mineiro |
| (Italy) **Inter Milan** | 1909 | – | 117 | Italian Football Championship (111 seasons) |
| (Malta) Floriana (Note: Absent for eleven seasons.) | 1909 | 1985 | 76 | Premier League |
| (Argentina) River Plate | 1909 | 2011 | 102 | Primera División (102 seasons) |
| **Austria Wien** | 1911 | – | 115 | 1. Klasse, Gauliga Ostmark, Staatsliga, Nationalliga & Bundesliga (115 seasons) |
| (Austria) **Rapid Wien** | 1911 | – | 115 | 1. Klasse, Gauliga Ostmark, Staatsliga, Nationalliga & Bundesliga (115 seasons) |
| (Northern Ireland) Glenavon | 1911 | 2004 | 93 | Football League & Premier League (82 seasons) |
| (Brazil) **Flamengo** | 1912 | – | 114 | Campeonato Carioca, Taça de Prata & Série A |
| (Hungary) **Újpest** | 1912 | – | 114 | Nemzeti Bajnokság (109 seasons) |
| (Argentina) Independiente | 1912 | 2013 | 101 | Primera División (101 seasons) |
| (Argentina) **Boca Juniors** | 1913 | – | 113 | Primera División (113 seasons) |
| (Paraguay) **Cerro Porteño** | 1913 | – | 113 | Primera División (113 seasons) |
| (Brazil) Corinthians (Note: Corinthians withdrew from the 1979 Brasileirão.) | 1913 | 2007 | 94 | Campeonato Paulista |
| (Brazil) Santos (Note: Santos withdrew from the 1920 Paulistão and from the 1979 Brasileirão.) | 1913 | 2023 | 110 | Campeonato Paulista |
| (Hungary) Budapest Honvéd | 1916 | 2003 | 87 | Nemzeti Bajnokság (84 seasons) |
| (Brazil) Palmeiras | 1916 | 2002 | 86 | Campeonato Paulista |
| (Netherlands) **Ajax** | 1917 | – | 109 | Eerste Klasse West & Eredivisie (108 seasons) |
| (England) **Arsenal** | 1919 | – | 107 | Football League First Division & Premier League (100 seasons) |
| (Germany) Hamburger SV | 1919 | 2018 | 99 | Norddeutsche Fußballmeisterschaft, Gauliga Nordmark, Oberliga Nord & Bundesliga (96 seasons) |
| (Belgium) **Standard Liège** | 1921 | – | 105 | Pro League (102 seasons) |
| (Costa Rica) **Alajuelense** | 1921 | – | 105 | Liga FPD |
| (Costa Rica) **Herediano** | 1921 | – | 105 | Liga FPD |
| (Republic of Ireland) **Bohemians** (Note: Bohemians were relegated in 1911 from the (now Northern) Irish League, but returned in 1912 and stayed there until 1920 to form the Irish Free State (now Republic of Ireland) League, from which they have never been relegated.) | 1921 | – | 105 | League of Ireland |
| (Netherlands) **Feyenoord** | 1921 | – | 105 | Eerste Klasse West & Eredivisie (103 seasons) |
| (Brazil) Cruzeiro | 1921 | 2019 | 98 | Campeonato Mineiro |
| (Brazil) Vasco da Gama | 1921 | 2008 | 87 | Campeonato Carioca |
| (Egypt) **Al Ahly** | 1922 | – | 104 | Cairo League & Egyptian Premier League |
| (Egypt) **Zamalek** | 1922 | – | 104 | Cairo League & Egyptian Premier League |
| (Republic of Ireland) Shamrock Rovers | 1922 | 2005 | 83 | League of Ireland |
| (Netherlands) Sparta Rotterdam | 1922 | 2002 | 80 | Eerste Klasse West & Eredivisie |
| (Croatia) **Hajduk Split** | 1923 | – | 103 | Yugoslav First League & HNL (93 seasons) |
| (Suriname) **Transvaal** | 1923 | – | 103 | SVB Topklasse & Suriname Major League |
| (Iceland) Valur | 1923 | 1999 | 76 | Úrvalsdeild |
| (Northern Ireland) Ards | 1923 | 1998 | 75 | Football League (69 seasons) |
| (Northern Ireland) Portadown | 1924 | 2008 | 84 | Football League & Premier League (77 seasons) |
| (Netherlands) **PSV Eindhoven** | 1926 | – | 100 | Eerste Klasse Zuid & Eredivisie (99 seasons) |
| (Brazil) Internacional | 1927 | 2016 | 89 | Campeonato Gaúcho |
| (Peru) **Universitario** | 1928 | – | 98 | Primera División |
| (Greece) Olympiacos | 1929 | – | 97 | Panhellenic Championship, Alpha Ethniki & Super League Greece |
| (Greece) Panathinaikos | 1929 | – | 97 | Panhellenic Championship, Alpha Ethniki & Super League Greece |
| (Spain) **Athletic Bilbao** | 1929 | – | 97 | Primera División (96 seasons) |
| (Spain) **FC Barcelona** | 1929 | – | 97 | Primera División (96 seasons) |
| (Spain) **Real Madrid CF** | 1929 | – | 97 | Primera División (96 seasons) |
| (Albania) KF Tirana | 1929 | 2017 | 88 | Kategoria Superiore |
| (Greece) AEK Athens | 1929 | 2013 | 84 | Panhellenic Championship, Alpha Ethniki & Super League Greece |
| (Brazil) **São Paulo** (Note: São Paulo withdrew from the 1935 Paulistão and from the 1979 Brasileirão.) | 1930 | – | 96 | Campeonato Paulista, Taça de Prata & Série A |
| (Indonesia) **Persija Jakarta** | 1930 | – | 96 | Perserikatan, Liga Indonesia Premier Division, & Super League |
| (Israel) **Maccabi Tel Aviv** | 1931 | – | 95 | Palestine League, Israeli League, Liga Alef, Liga Leumit & Premier League |
| (Malta) **Hibernians** (Note: Absent for four seasons, though there was no relegation at the time.) | 1932 | – | 94 | Premier League |
| (Chile) **Colo-Colo** | 1933 | – | 93 | Campeonato Nacional |
| (Greece) PAOK | 1933 | – | 93 | Panhellenic Championship, Alpha Ethniki & Super League Greece |
| (Portugal) **Benfica** | 1934 | – | 92 | Primeira Liga (91 seasons) |
| (Portugal) **Porto** | 1934 | – | 92 | Primeira Liga (91 seasons) |
| (Portugal) **Sporting CP** | 1934 | – | 92 | Primeira Liga (91 seasons) |
| **(Cyprus) APOEL FC** | 1934 | – | 92 | First Division |
| (Belgium) **Anderlecht** | 1935 | – | 91 | Pro League (87 seasons) |
| (Georgia (country)) **Dinamo Tbilisi** | 1936 | – | 90 | Soviet Top League & Umaglesi Liga |
| (Ukraine) **Dynamo Kyiv** | 1936 | – | 90 | Soviet Top League & Premier League |
| (Russia) Dynamo Moscow | 1936 | 2016 | 80 | Soviet Top League & Football Championship |
| (Bulgaria) **Levski Sofia** | 1937 | – | 89 | State Football Championship & A Group |
| (Faroe Islands) **Havnar Bóltfelag** | 1942 | – | 84 | Premier League |
| (Guatemala) **Municipal** | 1942 | – | 84 | Liga Nacional (73 seasons) |
| (Mexico) **América** | 1943 | – | 83 | Liga MX |
| (Mexico) **Guadalajara** | 1943 | – | 83 | Liga MX |
| (Malta) Valletta | 1944 | 2024 | 80 | Premier League |
| (Croatia) **Dinamo Zagreb** | 1946 | – | 80 | Yugoslav First League & Prva HNL (81 seasons) |
| (Serbia) **Partizan** | 1946 | – | 80 | Yugoslav First League, First League of Serbia and Montenegro & Serbian SuperLiga (81 seasons) |
| (Serbia) **Red Star Belgrade** | 1946 | – | 80 | Yugoslav First League, First League of Serbia and Montenegro & Serbian SuperLiga (81 seasons) |
| (Romania) **FCSB** | 1947 | – | 79 | Liga I |
| (Colombia) **Deportivo Cali** | 1948 | – | 78 | Primera Division |
| (Colombia) **Independiente Medellín** | 1948 | – | 78 | Primera Division |
| (Colombia) **Santa Fe** | 1948 | – | 78 | Primera Division |
| (Colombia) **Junior** | 1948 | – | 78 | Primera Division |
| (Colombia) **Millonarios** | 1948 | – | 78 | Primera Division |
| (Colombia) **Nacional** | 1948 | – | 78 | Primera Division |
| (Colombia) **Once Caldas** | 1948 | – | 78 | Primera Division |
| (Cyprus) **Anorthosis** | 1948 | – | 78 | First Division |
| (Poland) **Legia Warsaw** | 1948 | – | 78 | Ekstraklasa |
| (Italy) **AS Roma** | 1952 | – | 75 | Serie A |

== Never relegated from a top league ==
This is a list of football clubs which have never been relegated from their current national top-level league and have played at least ten seasons at this level. The year in the third column indicates when they began their uninterrupted run. If the club has never been relegated while also having a streak that precedes the formation of their current top league, then it is noted in the observations.

| League | Club | Since | Observations |
|---|---|---|---|
| Algeria | JS Kabylie | 1969 | |
| Andorra | FC Santa Coloma | 1994 | |
| Argentina | Boca Juniors | 1913 | |
| Argentina | Defensa y Justicia | 2014 | |
| Austria | Austria Wien | 1974 | Since 1911 |
| Austria | Rapid Wien | 1974 | Since 1911 |
| Austria | Sturm Graz | 1974 | Relegated from a top-tier league prior to the establishment of the Bundesliga |
| Austria | Wolfsberger AC | 2012 | Relegated at lower divisions but never from a top-tier |
| Azerbaijan | Neftçi | 1992 | Relegated from a top-tier league prior to the establishment of the Premyer Liqası |
| Azerbaijan | Qarabağ | 1992 | |
| Belgium | Standard Liège | 1921 | |
| Belgium | Anderlecht | 1935 | |
| Belarus | Dynamo Brest | 1992 | |
| Belarus | Dinamo Minsk | 1992 | Relegated from a top-tier league prior to the establishment of the Vysheyshaya Liga |
| Belarus | Neman Grodno | 1992 | |
| Belarus | BATE | 1998 | |
| Bolivia | The Strongest | 1950 | |
| Bolivia | Oriente Petrolero | 1977 | |
| Bosnia and Herzegovina | Sarajevo | 2000 | Relegated from a top-tier league prior to the establishment of the Premijer Liga |
| Bosnia and Herzegovina | Široki Brijeg | 2000 | |
| Bosnia and Herzegovina | Zrinjski Mostar | 2000 | Played in the wartime league of the Independent State of Croatia. Between 1945 and 1992, they were banned by the Yugoslav government |
| Bosnia and Herzegovina | Željezničar | 2000 | Relegated from a top-tier league prior to the establishment of the Premijer Liga |
| Brazil | Flamengo | 1971 | Since 1912 when considering the Carioca, 1967 when considering official national top-tier |
| Brazil | São Paulo | 1971 | Absent but never relegated. Since 1930 when considering the Paulista, 1967 when considering official national top-tier |
| Bulgaria | Levski Sofia | 1937 | |
| Bulgaria | Ludogorets Razgrad | 2011 | |
| Chile | Colo-Colo | 1933 | |
| China | Beijing Guoan | 1991 | Relegated from a top-tier league prior to the establishment of the Chinese Super League |
| China | Shanghai Shenhua | 1982 | Relegated from a top-tier league prior to the establishment of the Chinese Super League |
| Colombia | Atlético Nacional | 1948 | |
| Colombia | Millonarios | 1948 | |
| Colombia | Santa Fe | 1948 | |
| Colombia | Deportivo Cali | 1948 | Absent but never relegated |
| Colombia | Independiente Medellín | 1948 | Absent but never relegated |
| Colombia | Junior | 1948 | Absent but never relegated |
| Colombia | Once Caldas | 1948 | Absent but never relegated |
| Colombia | La Equidad | 2007 | |
| Colombia | Águilas Doradas | 2011 | |
| Costa Rica | Alajuelense | 1921 | |
| Costa Rica | Herediano | 1921 | |
| Costa Rica | Saprissa | 1949 | |
| Costa Rica | Pérez Zeledón | 1991 | |
| Croatia | Dinamo Zagreb | 1991 | |
| Croatia | Hajduk Split | 1991 | |
| Croatia | Osijek | 1991 | Relegated from a top-tier league prior to the establishment of the Prva HNL |
| Croatia | Rijeka | 1991 | Relegated from a top-tier league prior to the establishment of the Prva HNL |
| Croatia | Slaven Belupo | 1997 | |
| Croatia | Lokomotiva | 2009 | Relegated from a top-tier league prior to the establishment of the Prva HNL |
| Cyprus | APOEL | 1934 | Before 1974, played in the Greek top-level league when they became Cypriot champion |
| Cyprus | Anorthosis | 1948 | Before 1948, withdrew from the top-level league twice but they were never relegated |
| Cyprus | Omonia | 1953 | Before 1974, played in the Greek top-level league when they became Cypriot champion |
| Cyprus | Apollon | 1957 | |
| Czech Republic | Sparta Prague | 1993 | Relegated from a top-tier league prior to the establishment of the First League |
| Czech Republic | Slavia Prague | 1993 | Relegated from a top-tier league prior to the establishment of the First League |
| Czech Republic | Slovan Liberec | 1993 | Relegated from a top-tier league prior to the establishment of the First League |
| Czech Republic | Jablonec | 1994 | Relegated from a top-tier league prior to the establishment of the First League |
| Czech Republic | Teplice | 1996 | Relegated from a top-tier league prior to the establishment of the First League |
| Czech Republic | Mladá Boleslav | 2004 | Relegated at lower divisions but never from a top-tier |
| Denmark | Brøndby | 1982 | |
| Denmark | Copenhagen | 1992 | Successors of clubs that have been relegated from a top-tier league |
| Denmark | Midtjylland | 2000 | Successors of clubs that have been relegated from a top-tier league |
| Denmark | Nordsjælland | 2002 | |
| Ecuador | Barcelona | 1957 | |
| Ecuador | Independiente del Valle | 2010 | |
| Egypt | Al Ahly | 1948 | Since 1922 when considering the Cairo League |
| Egypt | Zamalek | 1948 | Since 1922 when considering the Cairo League |
| Egypt | ENPPI | 2002 | |
| Egypt | Tala'ea El Gaish SC | 2004 | |
| Egypt | Smouha | 2010 | |
| England | Arsenal | 1992 | Relegated from a top-tier league prior to the establishment of the Premier League |
| England | Chelsea | 1992 | Relegated from a top-tier league prior to the establishment of the Premier League |
| England | Everton | 1992 | Relegated from a top-tier league prior to the establishment of the Premier League |
| England | Liverpool | 1992 | Relegated from a top-tier league prior to the establishment of the Premier League |
| England | Manchester United | 1992 | Relegated from a top-tier league prior to the establishment of the Premier League |
| England | Tottenham Hotspur | 1992 | Relegated from a top-tier league prior to the establishment of the Premier League |
| England | Brighton & Hove Albion | 2017 | Relegated from a top-tier league prior to the establishment of the Premier League |
| Estonia | Flora | 1992 | |
| Estonia | Narva Trans | 1992 | |
| Estonia | FCI Levadia | 1999 | |
| Estonia | Tartu Tammeka | 2005 | |
| Estonia | Nõmme Kalju | 2008 | |
| Estonia | Paide Linnameeskond | 2009 | |
| Faroe Islands | Havnar Bóltfelag | 1942 | |
| Faroe Islands | Víkingur Gøta | 2008 | |
| Finland | HJK | 1990 | Relegated from a top-tier league prior to the establishment of the Veikkausliiga |
| Finland | IFK Mariehamn | 2005 | |
| Finland | SJK | 2014 | |
| (Georgia (country)) Georgia | Dinamo Tbilisi | 1990 | |
| Germany | Bayern Munich | 1965 | Relegated from a top-tier league prior to the establishment of the Bundesliga |
| Germany | Borussia Dortmund | 1976 | Relegated from a top-tier league prior to the establishment of the Bundesliga |
| Germany | Bayer Leverkusen | 1979 | Relegated from a top-tier league prior to the establishment of the Bundesliga |
| Germany | TSG 1899 Hoffenheim | 2008 | |
| Germany | FC Augsburg | 2011 | Relegated from a top-tier league prior to the establishment of the Bundesliga |
| Germany | RB Leipzig | 2016 | |
| Ghana | Asante Kotoko | 1958 | |
| Ghana | Hearts of Oak | 1958 | |
| Ghana | Aduana Stars F.C. | 2009 | |
| Greece | Olympiacos | 1959 | |
| Greece | Panathinaikos | 1959 | |
| Greece | PAOK | 1959 | |
| Greece | Asteras Tripolis | 2007 | |
| Guatemala | CSD Municipal | 1942 | |
| Guatemala | Comunicaciones F.C. | 1950 | |
| Honduras | Marathón | 1965 | |
| Honduras | Motagua | 1965 | |
| Honduras | Olimpia | 1965 | |
| Honduras | Real España | 1965 | |
| Hungary | Paksi FC | 2006 | |
| Indonesia | Persib Bandung | 1994 | Relegated from a top-tier league prior to the establishment of Liga Indonesia |
| Indonesia | Persija Jakarta | 1994 | |
| Indonesia | PSM Makassar | 1994 | PSM withdrew from the qualifying stage for financial reasons in 1952 and played in the breakaway LPI 2010/11–2013, but they were never relegated |
| Republic of Ireland | Bohemians | 1921 | |
| Republic of Ireland | St Patrick's Athletic | 1951 | |
| Iran | Persepolis | 1970 | |
| Iraq | Al-Quwa Al-Jawiya | 1974 | Formerly Al-Tayaran |
| Iraq | Al-Shorta | 1974 | Formerly Qiwa Al-Amn Al-Dakhili |
| Iraq | Al-Talaba | 1975 | Formerly Al-Jamiea |
| Iraq | Al-Zawraa | 1975 | |
| Iraq | Al-Naft | 1985 | |
| Israel | Maccabi Tel Aviv | 1931 | |
| Italy | Inter Milan | 1929 | Since 1909 |
| Ivory Coast | ASEC Mimosas | 1960 | |
| Ivory Coast | FC San Pédro | 2016 | |
| Japan | Kashima Antlers | 1993 | Relegated from a top-tier league prior to the establishment of the J1 League |
| Japan | Yokohama F. Marinos | 1993 | Relegated from a top-tier league prior to the establishment of the J1 League |
| Kazakhstan | Atyrau | 2001 | |
| Kuwait | Al-Qadsia | 1961 | Withdrew from the league in 1996–97, but they never got relegated |
| Kyrgyzstan | FC Dordoi | 1999 | |
| Kyrgyzstan | Abdysh-Ata Kant | 2003 | |
| Libya | Al-Madina Tripoli | 1963 | |
| Luxembourg | FC UNA Strassen | 2015 | Relegated at lower divisions but never from a top-tier |
| Malaysia | Selangor | 2005 | Relegated from a top-tier league prior to the establishment of the Malaysia Super League |
| Malaysia | Johor Darul Ta'zim | 2006 | Relegated from a top-tier league prior to the establishment of the Malaysia Super League |
| Malta | Hibernians | 1932 | Absent but never got relegated |
| Mexico (Note: Mexico suspended promotion and relegation for at least 5 years starting in 2020.) | América | 1943 | |
| Mexico | Guadalajara | 1943 | |
| Mexico | Toluca | 1953 | |
| Mexico | Pumas UNAM | 1962 | |
| Mexico | Cruz Azul | 1964 | |
| Mexico | Santos Laguna | 1988 | |
| Mexico | Club Tijuana | 2011 | |
| Montenegro | FK Budućnost Podgorica | 2006 | Relegated from a top-tier league prior to the establishment of the 1. CFL |
| Montenegro | OFK Petrovac | 2006 | |
| Montenegro | FK Sutjeska Nikšić | 2006 | Relegated from a top-tier league prior to the establishment of the 1. CFL |
| Morocco | Wydad AC | 1942 | |
| Morocco | Raja CA | 1956 | |
| Morocco | ASFAR | 1959 | Absent in the 1965/1966 saison but never got relegated |
| Netherlands | Ajax | 1956 | Relegated from a top-tier league prior to the establishment of the Eredivisie |
| Netherlands | PSV | 1956 | Relegated from a top-tier league prior to the establishment of the Eredivisie |
| Netherlands | Feyenoord | 1956 | Relegated from a top-tier league prior to the establishment of the Eredivisie |
| Netherlands | FC Utrecht | 1970 | VV DOS played in every season of the Eredivisie before merging into FC Utrecht in 1970 |
| Nigeria | Enugu Rangers | 1972 | |
| Northern Ireland | Cliftonville | 2008 | Since 1890 |
| Northern Ireland | Glentoran | 2008 | Since 1890 |
| Northern Ireland | Linfield | 2008 | Since 1890 |
| Northern Ireland | Dungannon Swifts | 2008 | Since 2002 |
| Northern Ireland | Ballymena United | 2008 | Relegated from a top-tier league prior to the establishment of the Premiership |
| Northern Ireland | Coleraine | 2008 | Relegated from a top-tier league prior to the establishment of the Premiership |
| Northern Ireland | Crusaders | 2008 | Relegated from a top-tier league prior to the establishment of the Premiership |
| North Macedonia | FK Rabotnički | 1998 | |
| Paraguay | Guaraní | 1906 | |
| Paraguay | Olimpia | 1906 | |
| Paraguay | Cerro Porteño | 1913 | |
| Panama | Plaza Amador | 1988 | |
| Panama | Tauro | 1988 | |
| Panama | San Francisco | 1992 | Formerly Deportivo La Previsora |
| Panama | Árabe Unido | 1996 | |
| Panama | Sporting San Miguelito | 1997 | |
| Panama | Universitario (Panama) | 2001 | Formerly Chorrillo FC |
| Peru | Universitario | 1928 | |
| Peru | Sporting Cristal | 1956 | Direct successor of Club Sporting Tabaco, which was relegated from the top-tier league |
| Peru | Sport Huancayo | 2009 | |
| Portugal | Benfica | 1934 | |
| Portugal | Porto | 1934 | |
| Portugal | Sporting CP | 1934 | |
| Romania | FCSB | 1947 | |
| Russia | CSKA Moscow | 1992 | Relegated from a top-tier league prior to the establishment of the Football Championship |
| Russia | Lokomotiv Moscow | 1992 | Relegated from a top-tier league prior to the establishment of the Football Championship |
| Russia | Spartak Moscow | 1992 | Relegated from a top-tier league prior to the establishment of the Football Championship |
| Russia | FC Krasnodar | 2011 | |
| Saudi Arabia | Al-Hilal | 1975 | All of these are mostly state-owned via the Public Investment Fund |
| Saudi Arabia | Al-Ittihad | 1975 | All of these are mostly state-owned via the Public Investment Fund |
| Saudi Arabia | Al-Nassr | 1975 | All of these are mostly state-owned via the Public Investment Fund |
| Scotland | Celtic | 2013 | Since 1890 |
| Scotland | Aberdeen | 2013 | Since 1905, absent for two though relegation was suspended at the time and league membership was maintained, although was relegated in 1999/2000 season after finishing bottom but was re-elected due to Falkirk's ground not being suitable!! |
| Scotland | Motherwell | 2013 | Relegated from a top-tier league prior to the establishment of the Scottish Premiership |
| Scotland | Rangers | 2016 | On league position, never relegated since 1890. In 2012, as a result of a financial crisis, membership for the then top tier, the Scottish Premier League, was lost. The club spent 4 years in the lower leagues before promotion to the new top tier, the Scottish Premiership, which was established in 2013 |
| Serbia | Partizan | 2006 | Since 1946 |
| Serbia | Red Star Belgrade | 2006 | Since 1946 |
| Serbia | FK Vojvodina | 2006 | Relegated from a top-tier league prior to the establishment of the SuperLiga |
| Serbia | FK Spartak Subotica | 2009 | Relegated from a top-tier league prior to the establishment of the SuperLiga |
| Slovakia | MFK Ružomberok | 1997 | |
| Slovakia | MFK Zemplín Michalovce | 2015 | |
| Slovenia | NK Celje | 1991 | Relegated at lower divisions but never from a top-tier |
| Slovenia | NK Maribor | 1991 | Relegated from a top-tier league prior to the establishment of the PrvaLiga |
| Slovenia | NK Olimpija Ljubljana | 2009 | |
| South Africa | Kaizer Chiefs | 1996 | |
| South Africa | Orlando Pirates | 1996 | |
| South Africa | Mamelodi Sundowns | 1996 | Relegated from a top-tier league prior to the establishment of the South African Premiership |
| South Africa | Supersport United | 1996 | Relegated from a top-tier league prior to the establishment of the South African Premiership. Sold prior to the start of the 2025–26 South African Premiership season. |
| South Korea | Pohang Steelers | 1983 | |
| South Korea | FC Seoul | 1984 | |
| South Korea | Ulsan HD | 1984 | |
| South Korea | Jeonbuk Hyundai Motors | 1995 | |
| Suriname | Transvaal | 1923 | Current top-tier league founded in 2024 |
| Spain | Athletic Bilbao | 1929 | |
| Spain | FC Barcelona | 1929 | |
| Spain | Real Madrid CF | 1929 | |
| Syria | Al-Ittihad SC Aleppo | 1966 | |
| Tajikistan | CSKA Pamir Dushanbe | 1992 | Relegated from a top-tier league prior to the establishment of the Tajik League |
| Tajikistan | FK Khujand | 1997 | |
| Tunisia | CS Sfaxien | 1955 | |
| Tunisia | Club Africain | 1955 | |
| Tunisia | Espérance de Tunis | 1955 | Did not participate in 1970–71 |
| Tunisia | Étoile du Sahel | 1955 | Did not participate in 1961–62 |
| Turkey | Beşiktaş | 1959 | |
| Turkey | Fenerbahçe | 1959 | |
| Turkey | Galatasaray | 1959 | |
| Turkey | Trabzonspor | 1974 | |
| Turkey | İstanbul Başakşehir | 2015 | Never relegated after re-organization |
| Turkey | Alanyaspor | 2016 | Relegated at lower divisions but never from a top-tier |
| Turkmenistan | Nebitçi FT | 1992 | |
| Turkmenistan | Merw FK | 1992 | |
| Turkmenistan | Şagadam FK | 1994 | |
| Ukraine | Dynamo Kyiv | 1992 | Since 1936 |
| Ukraine | Shakhtar Donetsk | 1992 | Relegated from a top-tier league prior to the establishment of the Premier League |
| United Arab Emirates | Al Ain FC | 1974 | |
| United Arab Emirates | Al-Nasr SC | 1974 | |
| United Arab Emirates | Al-Wasl FC | 1974 | |
| United Arab Emirates | Al Wahda | 1985 | |
| United Arab Emirates | Al Jazira | 1988 | |
| Uruguay | Peñarol | 1900 | |
| Uruguay | Nacional | 1901 | |
| Uruguay | Boston River | 2016 | |
| Uzbekistan | Navbahor Namangan | 1992 | |
| Uzbekistan | Pakhtakor Tashkent | 1992 | Relegated from a top-tier league prior to the establishment of the Uzbek League |
| Uzbekistan | Nasaf Qarshi | 1997 | |
| Uzbekistan | Qizilqum Zarafshon | 2000 | |
| Venezuela | Deportivo Táchira | 1975 | |
| Venezuela | Caracas | 1985 | |
| Venezuela | Deportivo La Guaira | 2009 | |
| Vietnam | Song Lam Nghe An | 2000 | Formerly Song Lam Nghe Tinh Ranked 14th in the 2021 season but did not relegate due to the remainder of the season getting cancelled |
| Vietnam | Hoang Anh Gia Lai | 2003 | Formerly Gia Lai - Kon Tum |
| Vietnam | Dong A Thanh Hoa | 2007 | Formerly FLC Thanh Hoa, Lam Son Thanh Hoa and Thanh Hoa FC Originally finished 14th in the 2009 season, they merged into Viettel - Thanh Hoa FC (formerly The Cong FC), then finished 9th, and re-established as Lam Son Thanh Hoa FC, therefore escaped relegation |
| Vietnam | Hanoi FC | 2009 | Formerly Ha Noi T&T and T&T Ha Noi |
| Wales | The New Saints | 1993 | Formerly Llansantffraid F.C. and Total Network Solutions |

The United States and Canada have a franchise system and therefore do not have relegation and promotion in that system.

== See also ==
- Promotion and relegation
