= Oberliga Südhannover/Braunschweig =

- Formerly: Südkreisliga
- Sport: Association football
- First season: 1921
- Ceased: 1933
- Replaced by: Gauliga Niedersachsen
- Country: Weimar Republic
- Region: Province of Hanover, Free State of Brunswick
- Level on pyramid: 1

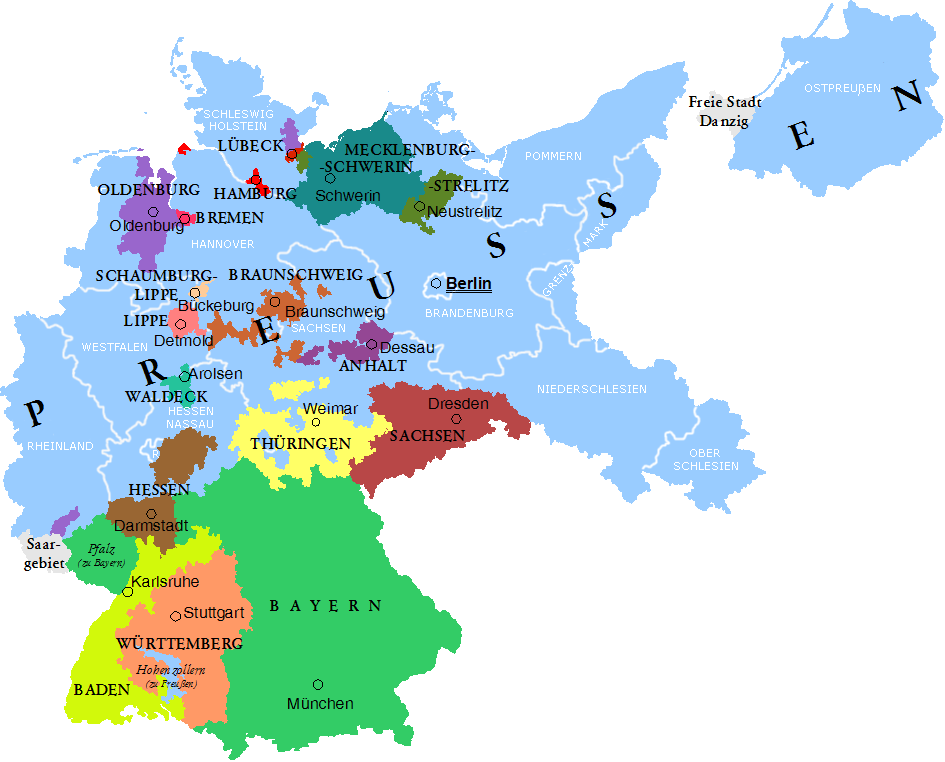
Map of Germany in 1925

The Oberliga Südhannover/Braunschweig, also known as Südkreisliga and Bezirksliga Südhannover/Braunschweig at various points, was one of several first tier association football leagues in Germany from 1921 to 1933. The league covered the Free State of Brunswick and the southern part of the Prussian Province of Hanover.

== History ==
Until 1920 various local championships were played in the area of the Northern German Football Association. For the 1920–21 season, the number of first level leagues was greatly reduced to just two Verbandsligas: a northern group covering Hamburg and the Prussian Province of Schleswig-Holstein, and a southern group covering Brunswick, Bremen and the Province of Hanover. However, after just one season the leagues were split-up again into several smaller Bezirksligas to save costs during hyperinflation. Among those, the Südkreisliga (later: Bezirksliga Südhannover/Braunschweig) covered the area of Brunswick and the southern part of the Province of Hanover. From 1922 until 1928 the Südkreisliga played in two groups, with the winners of each group playing each other for the championship. The champions, and since 1922–23 also the runners-up, qualified for the Northern German football championship.

In the 1928–29 season no regular league matches were played in Northern Germany due to a conflict between the clubs and the Northern German FA. Some major clubs demanded the creation of a single, unified top-level league in Northern Germany, while smaller clubs feared to be left out. While some of the big Hamburg and Schleswig-Holstein clubs, including Hamburger SV, Holstein Kiel, and Altona 93, formed a rebel league, most clubs in the southern parts of Northern Germany sat out the season. In the end six Northern German Oberligas were formed as a compromise for the 1929–30 season. The Oberliga Südhannover/Braunschweig covered the same area as the old Bezirksliga, but from 1929 on was again played as a single division without groups. The top four of the Oberliga Südhannover/Braunschweig qualified for the Northern German football championship.

With the rise of the Nazis to power, the Gauligas were introduced as the highest level of football in Germany. In 1933, the Oberliga Südhannover/Braunschweig was therefore merged into the new Gauliga Niedersachsen.

== Champions ==
Season	Winner	Runner-up
1921–22	SV Arminia Hannover	Eintracht Braunschweig
1922–23	SV Arminia Hannover	Eintracht Hannover
1923–24	Eintracht Braunschweig	SV Arminia Hannover
1924–25	Eintracht Braunschweig	SV Arminia Hannover
1925–26	SV Arminia Hannover	Hannoverscher SC
1926–27	Hannover 96	Eintracht Braunschweig
1927–28	Hannover 96	Hannoverscher SC
1928–29	not held	
1929–30	Hannover 96	SV Arminia Hannover
1930–31	SV Arminia Hannover	Eintracht Braunschweig
1931–32	SV Arminia Hannover	Eintracht Braunschweig
1932–33	SV Arminia Hannover	SV Algermissen 11

== Placings 1922–33 ==
Club	1922	1923^{2}	1924^{2}	1925^{2}	1926^{2}	1927^{2}	1928^{2}	1930	1931	1932	1933
SV Arminia Hannover	1	1	1	1	1	2	2	2	1	1	1
Eintracht Braunschweig	2	2	1	1	2	1	3	5	2	2	6
Hannoverscher SC^{1}	3	3	2	2	1	3	1				
Hannover 96	4	3	7	5	5	1	1	1	5	7	3
Eintracht Hannover	5	1	4	4	3	2	6				
VfB Peine	6	2	3	3	5	4	2	8	8	4	4
SpVgg. Hildesheim 07	7	6	2	7	7	8	8				
Sport Rot-Weiß Hannover^{1}	8	5	6	4	4	4	5				
VfB Braunschweig	9	7	6	5	2	3	4	4	6	6	7
BV Werder Hannover		4	4	6	3	5	3	6	9		
Germania Wolfenbüttel		6	5	8	8						
Goslarer SC 08		7	7	6	8		5	10			
Viktoria Burgdorf		8									
Niedersachsen Döhren		4	3	2	4	8					
SV Borussia 11 Hannover		5	8			6	7				
MTV Wolfenbüttel		8									
Lehrter SV			5	8							
RSV Hildesheim 06			8						3	3	5
Leu Braunschweig				3	6	7	6	7	4	5	9
SV Linden				7	6	6	7				
VfL Helmstedt					7	7	8				
Concordia Hildesheim						5	4	9			
SpVgg. Hannover 97								3	7	9	
SV Hötensleben										8	8
SV Algermissen 11											2

Source: Fußball in der Region Braunschweig. 60 Jahre NFV-Bezirk Braunschweig (2006) (in German), publisher: NFV-Bezirk Braunschweig, pages: 84–88

- ^{1} Merged into SpVgg. Hannover in 1928.
- ^{2} Played in two groups.

== See also ==
- 1. Spielklasse Bezirk Braunschweig
- Gauliga Südhannover-Braunschweig
- Landesliga Braunschweig
- Landesliga Hannover
