= Plagge =

Plagge is a surname. Notable people with the surname include:

- Frank Plagge (born 1963), German footballer and manager
- Karl Plagge (1897–1957), German military officer
- Ludwig Plagge (1910–1948), German military officer
- Wolfgang Plagge (born 1960), Norwegian composer and pianist
