= Sylvestre Nsengiyaremye =

Rwandan professional footballer

- Nsengiyaremye with Rot Weiss in 2026

Personal information
- Full name: Sylvestre Nsengiyaremye
- Date of birth: 27 December 1999 (age 26)
- Place of birth: Rulindo, Rwanda
- Height: 1.82 m (6 ft 0 in)
- Position: Left and right wings

Team information
- Current team: Koldinger SV

Youth career
- 2016–2017: Heroes FC
- 2017–2022: Nanjing FC

Senior career*
Years	Team	Apps	(Gls)
2023–2024	Sv Olympia Braunschweig	21	(4)
2024–2025	vFB Rot weiß 04	7	(0)
2025–2026	VFB Wissen	0	(0)
2025–2026	HSC Hannover	10	(0)
2026	ihme Roloven	9	(0)
2026–2027	Koldinger SV	5	(1)
- * Club domestic league appearances and goals

Sylvestre Nsengiyaremye (also known as Kamoso) is a Rwandan footballer who was born on 27 December 1999 plays as a winger. His career has included football in China and Germany, as well as a trial with Ukrainian club Dynamo Kyiv.

== Early life and youth career ==
Profiles by The New Times and KT Press state that Nsengiyaremye was born in Rulindo District and developed as a footballer through local academies, including Dream Team Academy, Heroes Academy and SEC Academy. He later sought opportunities outside Rwanda.

== Career ==
=== China ===
According to KT Press, Nsengiyaremye's first international move came during the 2017–18 season, when he joined Chinese club Nanjing FC. The New Times also described Nanjing FC as the first stage of his career abroad before his subsequent move toward Europe.

The China period was affected by the COVID-19 pandemic. In an account quoted by KT Press, Nsengiyaremye said that the pandemic prevented him from taking opportunities with several other Chinese clubs. The statement is his account of the effect of the pandemic on his career rather than an independently established finding about the clubs involved.

=== Ukraine ===
After his time in China, Nsengiyaremye had an opportunity to trial with Dynamo Kyiv, according to both The New Times and KT Press. KT Press reported that the trial did not result in a professional contract.

=== Germany ===
After the interrupted opportunity in Ukraine, Nsengiyaremye continued his career in Germany through lower-division football. KT Press described his move to Germany as a restart after the earlier opportunities in China and Ukraine, while The New Times reported that he signed a one-year contract with SV Olympia Braunschweig.

At SV Olympia Braunschweig, Nsengiyaremye competed in Germany's lower division before moving to VfB Rot-Weiß and later VfB Wissen.

During the 2022–23 season, he joined VfB Rot-Weiß, according to The New Times, and was later loaned to VfB Wissen for the 2023–24 campaign. The New Times reported that a subsequent agreement between VfB Wissen and HSC Hannover facilitated his move to HSC Hannover II. KT Press likewise listed VfB Rot-Weiß, VfB Wissen and HSC Hannover II among the German clubs for which he played.

In April 2026, The New Times reported that Nsengiyaremye was contracted to HSC Hannover II, having joined the club in 2025. The same report said that he was on loan to SV Ihme-Roloven until May. KT Press also included SV Ihme-Roloven among the German clubs he had played for.

In July 2026, KT Press reported that Nsengiyaremye had recently been on trial with Eintracht Braunschweig II. The report stated that no permanent agreement had been announced, and did not report that he had signed for or joined the club.

== International career ==
The New Times reported that Nsengiyaremye was part of Rwanda's provisional under-17 squad in 2017 under coach Aloys Kanamugire and was later named in the under-20 team in 2019. The same report stated that he had not received a call-up to Rwanda's senior national team.

== Community activities ==
The New Times reported that Nsengiyaremye supported young footballers in Rwanda by providing equipment, assisting with education and connecting them with coaches. KT Press reported that he donated training equipment to grassroots football initiatives and participated in providing food and hygiene supplies to vulnerable families during the COVID-19 pandemic in 2020.
