= Serhan Zengin =

German-Turkish footballer and coach

Personal information
- Date of birth: 11 April 1990 (age 36)
- Place of birth: Bremen, West Germany
- Height: 1.75 m (5 ft 9 in)
- Position: Midfielder

Youth career
- 1997–2009: Werder Bremen

Senior career*
Years	Team	Apps	(Gls)
2009–2010	Werder Bremen II	13	(0)
2011	FC St. Pauli II	4	(0)
2011–2013	FC Oberneuland	33	(16)
2011	FC Oberneuland II	3	(0)
2014	SV Wilhelmshaven	12	(1)
2014–2015	VfB Oldenburg	6	(0)
2014	VfB Oldenburg II	2	(1)
2015–2016	Schwarz-Weiß Rehden	10	(0)
Total		83	(18)

Managerial career
- 2017–: TuS Komet Arsten (under-19)
- * Club domestic league appearances and goals

Serhan Zengin (born 11 April 1990) is a German-Turkish former footballer who played as a midfielder. He is the coach of the under-19 team of TuS Komet Arsten.

== Career ==
Zengin made his professional debut for Werder Bremen II in the 3. Liga on 25 July 2009, starting in the home match against Rot-Weiß Erfurt, which finished as a 0–0 draw.
