= 1. Spielklasse Bezirk Braunschweig =

Former association football league in Germany

- Sport: Association football
- Founded: 1904
- Folded: 1922
- Countries: German Empire; Weimar Republic
- Last champion: Eintracht Braunschweig (1919–1920; final season)
- Level on pyramid: Level 1

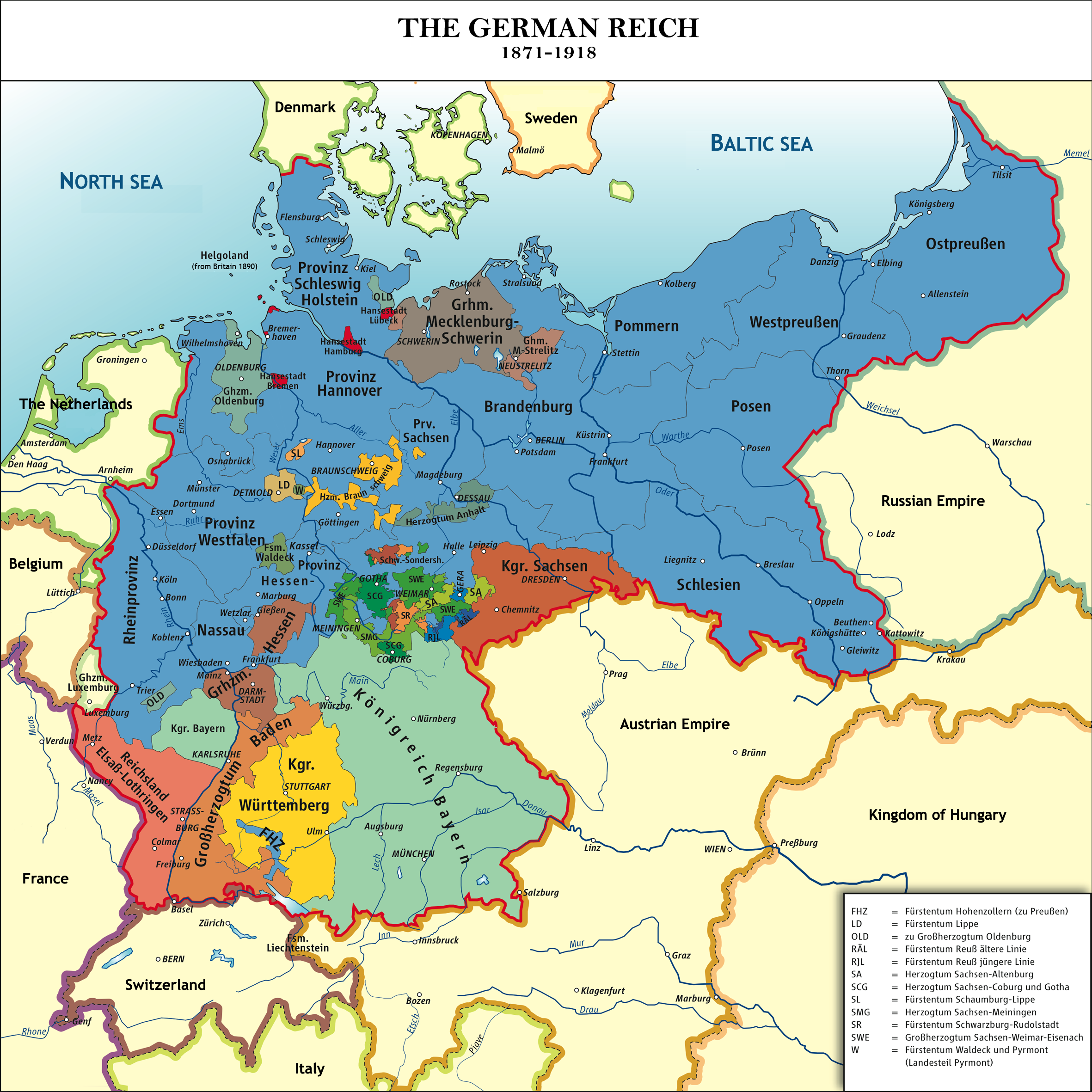
Map of German Reich 1871–1918

The 1. Spielklasse Bezirk Braunschweig, also known as 1. Spielklasse Herzogtum Braunschweig, Bezirksliga Braunschweig and Bezirksmeisterschaft Braunschweig at various points, was the highest association football league in the German Duchy of Brunswick and, later, the Free State of Brunswick from 1904 to 1920. The league also covered small parts of the neighbouring Prussian Province of Hanover. It was one of several first tier leagues in the German Empire and Weimar Republic.

== History ==
The Duchy of Brunswick Football Association (German: Fußballbund für das Herzogtum Braunschweig) was founded in May 1904 as the first governing body for football in the territory of Brunswick. Previously, clubs from Brunswick had only been able to play friendly matches. Eintracht Braunschweig's chairman Johannes Runge had been the driving force behind the creation of the new association. League play started with the 1904–05 season. During its first season, the champions of the newly founded 1. Spielklasse Herzogtum Braunschweig qualified directly for the German football championship play-off.

In 1905, the Northern German Football Association was founded, and the Duchy of Brunswick Football Association became one of several district associations within the Northern German FA. However, the Brunswick football championship continued to be played as a first tier league, its champions now qualifying for the Northern German football championship, which in turn served as a qualifier for the German championship.

In 1913–14 the league was played as a second tier competition after the introduction of the short-lived Verbandsliga Norddeutschland, a new first tier league that covered all of Northern Germany. Eintracht Braunschweig was the only club from the Duchy of Brunswick that qualified for the new league. However, due to the outbreak of World War I only one season of the Verbandsliga was ever played. In 1920, the new Südkreisliga was created as the new top division of football in the eastern part of today's Lower Saxony, covering Brunswick, the city state of Bremen, as well as the Province of Hanover. Just one season later, however, the Südkreisliga (later renamed Oberliga Südhannover/Braunschweig) was reformed again, this time covering a smaller area including Brunswick and the southern part of Hanover.

== Brunswick football champions ==
As first tier:

| Season | Winner |
| 1904–05 | Eintracht Braunschweig |
| 1905–06 | Eintracht Braunschweig |
| 1906–07 | Eintracht Braunschweig |
| 1907–08 | Eintracht Braunschweig |
| 1908–09 | Eintracht Braunschweig |
| 1909–10 | Eintracht Braunschweig |
| 1910–11 | Eintracht Braunschweig |
| 1911–12 | Eintracht Braunschweig |
| 1912–13 | Eintracht Braunschweig |
| 1914–15 | not held |
| 1915–16 | Eintracht Braunschweig |
| 1916–17 | Eintracht Braunschweig |
| 1917–18 | Eintracht Braunschweig |
| 1918–19 | VfB Braunschweig |
| 1919–20 | Eintracht Braunschweig |

As second tier:

| Season | Winner |
| 1913–14 | Britannia Braunschweig |
| 1920–21 | VfB Braunschweig |
| 1921–22 | MTV Wolfenbüttel |

== See also ==
- Oberliga Südhannover/Braunschweig
- Gauliga Südhannover-Braunschweig
- Landesliga Braunschweig
