= Jürgen Moll =

German footballer

Personal information
- Date of birth: 16 November 1939
- Place of birth: Karlsbad, German Reich
- Date of death: 16 December 1968 (aged 29)
- Place of death: Egestorf, West Germany
- Height: 1.83 m (6 ft 0 in)
- Positions: Striker; defender

Youth career
- MTV Braunschweig
- –1957: Leu Braunschweig

Senior career*
Years	Team	Apps	(Gls)
1957–1968	Eintracht Braunschweig	280	(103)
- * Club domestic league appearances and goals

Jürgen Moll (born 16 November 1939 in Karlsbad; died 16 December 1968 on Bundesautobahn 7 near Egestorf in a car crash) was a German football player.

== Early life ==
Moll was born in Karlsbad, Sudetenland in 1939, but came to Braunschweig as a refugee with his family at the end of World War II.

== Career ==
Moll spent his entire ten-year professional career with Eintracht Braunschweig, including six seasons in the Bundesliga, starting with the league's foundation in 1963. He joined the club for the 1957–58 season from Leu Braunschweig, at the time the city's second best team. During the early 1960s he succeeded the retiring Werner Thamm as Eintracht's most prolific goal scorer. Moll was also the player to score Eintracht Braunschweig's first ever Bundesliga goal.

However, later in his career he was turned from a center forward into a defender by Eintracht Braunschweig manager Helmuth Johannsen. Moll stayed one of the club's key player in his new position as well, starting every single game in the team's 1966–67 championship-winning season.

== Personal life ==
Moll was married to the actress Sigrid Mollwitz. The pair had two daughters.

== Death ==
Moll and his wife died in a car accident while on return from vacation during the winter break of the 1968–69 season. Two charity matches were played for the benefit of the Molls' children, the first featured West Germany's 1954 FIFA World Cup winning squad in the line-up of the tournament's final, the second saw a combined squad of Eintracht Braunschweig and rivals Hannover 96 take on a Bundesliga all-star team. Moll's funeral in Braunschweig was attended by 4,000 people, including the West Germany national team and the entire squad of Hannover 96.

== Honours ==
- Bundesliga champion: 1966–67
