= LSV Ahlhorn =

German football club

- Full name: Luftwaffensportverein Ahlhorn
- Founded: 1943
- Dissolved: 2008–09
Home colours	Away colours

Lufttwaffensportverein Ahlhorn was a short-lived German football club from the town of Ahlhorn near Oldenburg, Lower Saxony. LSV was an air force sports club that was active for just a single season (1943–44) in the first division Gauliga Oldenburg-Friesland where they earned a 3rd-place finish. During World War II it was common in Germany for military sides to take part in domestic competition. The most successful of these clubs was LSV Hamburg which appeared in the final of the Tschammerpokal, predecessor of today's German Cup, in 1943 and in the national championship final in 1944.

The Gauliga Oldenburg-Friesland was a subdivision of the Gauliga Weser-Ems which was itself formed out of the division of the Gauliga Niedersachsen (I) in 1942. As the war progressed regional football competition gave way to district and city-based play due to the difficulties and danger associated with travel in the country. The 1944–45 season began earlier than normal but competition soon collapsed as Allied armies advanced into Germany. LSV Ahlhorn did not play a single match that season and disappeared with the end of the war.
