= Leu Braunschweig =

German football club

HSC Leu 06 Braunschweig
- Full name: Heidberger Sportclub Leu 06 Braunschweig
- Founded: 24 May 1906
- Ground: Bezirkssportanlage Heidberg
- Capacity: 1,000
- Chairman: Dr. Andreas Hoffmann
- Manager: Dennis Lüdecke
- League: Bezirksliga Braunschweig Staffel 2 (VII)
- 2015–16: 5th
Home colours	Away colours

HSC Leu 06 Braunschweig, commonly known as Leu Braunschweig, is a German association football club based in Braunschweig, Lower Saxony.

== History ==
The club was founded as BV Wacker Braunschweig in 1906. In 1911, Wacker was merged into MTV Braunschweig, another local sports club. However, both clubs separated again in 1923. Since the name Wacker had been taken by another Braunschweig club, the side re-established under the name FC Leu. Leu is Middle High German for "lion", the heraldic animal of Braunschweig.

The club was twice part of top-flight German football early in its history, first in the 1. Spielklasse Bezirk Braunschweig from 1906 until 1911, and then in the Bezirksliga Südhannover/Braunschweig (since 1929 Oberliga Südhannover/Braunschweig) from 1924 until 1933.

Leu was reunited with former partner MTV Braunschweig in 1945, but the union was short-lived as they went their way again in 1954, this time as SC Leu 06 Braunschweig. In 1979, the club moved into a new ground in the district of Heidberg within Braunschweig. The move was reflected by adding the letter "H" to the club's name to represent their new home.

After its reemergence in 1954 and until 1963, Leu played second-division football in the Amateuroberliga Niedersachsen, narrowly missing out on promotion to the Oberliga Nord in 1960, 1961, and 1962. With the foundation of the Bundesliga as the new first level of West Germany's league pyramid in 1963, Leu slipped into third-tier play. In 1969, the club was promoted back into the second tier, now the Regionalliga Nord, and stayed there until relegation in 1973. Since then, the team has been largely a lower-tier side, most recently competing in the Bezirksliga Braunschweig Staffel 2 (VII).

== Notable former players ==
The list includes former players of Leu Braunschweig who made appearances in professional football before or after playing for the club:

- (Germany) Wolfgang Dramsch
- (Germany) Jürgen Moll

== Notable former managers ==
- (Germany) Hans Jäcker

== Honours ==
The club's honours:

- Lower Saxony championship:
  - Champions (2): 1961, 1969
  - Runners-up (3): 1960, 1962, 1967
- Amateuroberliga Niedersachsen-Ost (II):
  - Champions (3): 1960, 1961, 1962
  - Runners-up (1): 1963
