= Goslarer SC 08 =

German football club

- Full name: Goslarer Sport Club von 1908 e.V.
- Nickname: Kaiserstadt-Kicker
- Founded: 1908; 118 years ago
- Ground: S-Arena
- Capacity: 5,001
- Chairman: Wolfgang Gasz
- Manager: Sven Thoss
- League: Landesliga Braunschweig (VI)
- 2015–16: Regionalliga Nord (IV), 16th (relegated)
| Home colours | Away colours |

The Goslarer SC 08 is a German association football club from the city of Goslar, Lower Saxony.

The club's most notable achievement was winning the tier-five Niedersachsenliga and earning promotion to the Regionalliga Nord in 2009 and 2012.

Apart from football, the club also offers hockey, track and field, and archery as other sports.

== History ==
=== 1908–1945 ===
Formed in 1908, the club entered competitive football three years later, in 1911.

The team achieved success for the first time when it earned promotion to the then tier-one Südkreisliga in 1922 after a title in the local Northern Harz championship. It also opened its Osterfeldstadion that year. German football was very regionalised in this era and a large number of local leagues existed at the top-level of football. GSC was grouped in the Kreisliga Südkreis-Group 1, a league made up of eight teams and won by SV Arminia Hannover that season, with Goslar coming seventh. The club repeated this result in the following season, and finished one position better in 1924–25. In 1925–26, the team was moved to Group 2 of the league, in exchange for Hannover 96, but it did not fare well in this league, coming last with only two wins out of fourteen games.

GSC spent only one season in the second tier, earning promotion back in 1926–27. It returned to the Group 2 of the Bezirksliga Südhannover-Braunschweig, where it finished fifth in 1927–28, its best result at this level yet. After no championship being played in 1928–29, the two divisions of the league were merged for 1929–30 and renamed Oberliga Südhannover-Braunschweig. It this more competitive league with Arminia Hannover, Hannover 96 and Eintracht Braunschweig in it, GSC performed poorly, remaining without a win and finishing last out of ten clubs.

It was to be the club's last season in top-flight, in the Gauliga era that followed from 1933, it failed to advance to the tier-one Gauliga Niedersachsen or, from 1943, the Gauliga Südhannover-Braunschweig.

=== 1945–1994 ===
In post-Second World War Germany, the club, playing under the name of TSV Goslar, gained entry to the tier-two Landesliga Niedersachsen-Braunschweig in 1947. In its first season there, it finished in fourth place. It finished runners-up the following year.

The four Landesligas in Lower Saxony (German: Niedersachsen) were reduced to two leagues from 1949 and Goslar became part of the Amateuroberliga Niedersachsen Ost, which it won in its first attempt. The club was unsuccessful in gaining promotion to the next level up however, failing in the promotion round to the Oberliga Nord.

TSV Goslar declined somewhat from there, finishing third in 1951, fourth in 1952 and ninth in 1953. The club also changed its name to the current Goslarer SC 08 that year. In the seasons that followed, the club finished in mid-table but, in 1958–59, it came last in the league and suffered relegation to the third tier.

In 1962, the team returned to the Amateuroberliga, but only for one season, being relegated immediately again. With the introduction of the Fußball-Bundesliga in 1963, the league slipped to third tier and, from 1964 to 1994, the highest league in the state of Lower Saxony was played as a single division, when the eastern and western group merged. In this era, GSC never made a return to the league, existing as a lower-division amateur club in the region.

=== International Youth Exchange ===
In 1968, the club instigated a "Youth Exchange" with Norwegian club Drafn, of Drammen. The deal meant that the youth team from Drammen visited Goslar 2–14 August in 1968, the first ever such "Austausch" after WWII. Alternate years the German club's youth visited Drammen. The deal was sponsored by war veteran Gustav Ruch, and worked until 1974.

=== 1994–present ===
When the league, now renamed Verbandsliga Niedersachsen, was split into two regional divisions again in 1994, Goslar gained entry to the eastern one, where it finished tenth in its first year. The team spent its following seasons as a mid-table side again, but came close to promotion in 1999–2000, when it finished third, three points behind the league champion.

In 2003, the club merged with local side SV Sudmerberg to become Goslarer SC 08 Sudmerberg. While the merger is still in place, the usage of the Sudmerberg in the club name has virtually gone out of use. The following year, the team finished twelfth in the league and was relegated by one point, back to the tier-six Bezirksoberliga Braunschweig. It made an immediate return from there finished tenth in the Verbandsliga again in 2005–06.

With the second-worst support in the league in 2006–07, 156 supporters per game, and the second-worst performance, Goslar-Sudmerberg was relegated once more that year, back to the Bezirksoberliga. The club managed another immediate return from this league in 2007–08, returning to what now became the Oberliga Niedersachsen-West, a name change caused by the disbanding of the Oberliga Nord.

The 2008–09 season in the Oberliga was a huge success for the club, winning the championship by eleven points and earning the right to play-off for the Lower Saxony championship with western champions VfB Oldenburg. With only the winner of this two games gaining promotion, GSC lost to VfB at home 1–0 but then won in Oldenburg 2–1 and earned the right to play in the Regionalliga Nord in 2009–10 on the Away goals rule. The decisive second game in Oldenburg, held in front of 12,000 spectators, ended with disappointed VfB fans storming the pitch at the end of the game, followed by Goslar fans joining them, which resulted in a fight on the playing field which had to be broken up by the police.

In a pre-season friendly on 7 July 2009, the club played Scottish Premier League side Heart of Midlothian F.C., Goslar losing narrowly 2–1 to the young Hearts side. It was the first game of Hearts pre-season tour of Germany.

After a disappointing season in the Regionalliga Nord GSC had to go down in Oberliga Niedersachsen again. In 2010-11 the club came only seventh but won the league championship the year after and earned another promotion to the Regionalliga and spend the next four seasons at this level. Finishing 16th in 2015–16 and being relegated the club declined to apply for an Oberliga licence and instead dropped down to the tier six Landesliga Braunschweig.

== Honours ==
The club's honours:

=== League ===
- Niedersachsenliga (V)
  - Champions: 2012
- Oberliga Niedersachsen-Ost (V)
  - Champions: 2009
- Bezirksoberliga Braunschweig (VI)
  - Champions: 2005, 2008

== Current squad ==
As of 8 June 2015

Note: Flags indicate national team as defined under FIFA eligibility rules; some limited exceptions apply. Players may hold more than one non-FIFA nationality.

| No. | Pos. | Nation | Player |
|---|---|---|---|
| 1 | GK | GER | Felix Junghan |
| 2 | DF | GER | David Malembana |
| 3 | DF | GER | Marcel Ziemann |
| 4 | DF | GER | Marco Fischer |
| 5 | MF | GER | Paul Gehrmann |
| 6 | MF | GER | Cetin Erbek |
| 8 | MF | GER | Karsten Fischer |
| 9 | FW | GER | Brian Behrens |
| 10 | MF | GER | Emanuel Bento |
| 11 | FW | GER | Farid Affo |
| 13 | FW | ALB | Tom Grellmann |

| No. | Pos. | Nation | Player |
|---|---|---|---|
| 14 | DF | GER | Sebastian Schmidt |
| 15 | DF | FRA | Christopher Luhaka |
| 16 | MF | TUR | Gökay Isitan |
| 30 | DF | AUS | Kojo Brown |
| 18 | MF | SVK | Gabriel Bezák |
| 20 | GK | GER | Azmir Alisic |
| 22 | MF | GER | Torben Deppe |
| 23 | MF | POL | Marcin Ankudowicz |
| 24 | DF | GER | Daniel Vaughan |
| 33 | FW | LAO | Billy Ketkeophomphone |

== Recent managers ==
Recent managers of the club:

| Manager | Start | Finish |
|---|---|---|
| Franz Gerber | 2006 | 2007 |
| Goran Barjaktarevic | 2006 | 2010 |
| Manfred Wölpper | 2010 | 2012 |
| Frank Eulberg | 2012 | 2013 |
| Mario Block | 2013 | 2014 |
| Slavomir Lukac | 2014 | 2015 |
| Dariusz Szubert | 2015 | |

== Recent seasons ==
The recent season-by-season performance of the club:

| Season | Division | Tier | Position |
|---|---|---|---|
| 1999–2000 | Verbandsliga Niedersachsen-Ost | V | 3rd |
| 2000–01 | Verbandsliga Niedersachsen-Ost | V | 8th |
| 2001–02 | Verbandsliga Niedersachsen-Ost | V | 3rd |
| 2002–03 | Verbandsliga Niedersachsen-Ost | V | 12th |
| 2003–04 | Verbandsliga Niedersachsen-Ost | V | 13th ↓ |
| 2004–05 | Bezirksoberliga Braunschweig | VI | 1st ↑ |
| 2005–06 | Verbandsliga Niedersachsen-Ost | V | 10th |
| 2006–07 | Verbandsliga Niedersachsen-Ost | V | 15th ↓ |
| 2007–08 | Bezirksoberliga Braunschweig | VI | 1st ↑ |
| 2008–09 | Oberliga Niedersachsen-Ost | V | 1st ↑ |
| 2009–10 | Regionalliga Nord | IV | 18th ↓ |
| 2010–11 | Oberliga Niedersachsen | V | 7th |
| 2011–12 | Oberliga Niedersachsen | V | 1st ↑ |
| 2012–13 | Regionalliga Nord | IV | 8th |
| 2013–14 | Regionalliga Nord | IV | 5th |
| 2014–15 | Regionalliga Nord | IV | 15th |
| 2015–16 | Regionalliga Nord | IV | 16th ↓ |
| 2016–17 | Landesliga Braunschweig | VI | |

- With the introduction of the Regionalligas in 1994 and the 3. Liga in 2008 as the new third tier, below the 2. Bundesliga, all leagues below dropped one tier.

| ↑ Promoted | ↓ Relegated |

== Stadium ==
The club's home ground, the S-Arena, holds 5,001 spectators, 1,206 of those seated. Next to the stadium, the club's training facilities consist of two more football fields and an artificial pitch. During the 2009–2010 season, Goslarer SC played in the Eintracht-Stadion of nearby Braunschweig. The Osterfeldstadion (former name of stadium) was under construction at the time, because it didn't meet the requirements of the Regionalliga Nord.
