= Wolfgang Dramsch =

German footballer

Personal information
- Date of birth: 22 July 1949 (age 77)
- Place of birth: Braunschweig, West Germany
- Position: Goalkeeper

Youth career
- Eintracht Braunschweig
- 1967–1968: 1. FC Wolfsburg

Senior career*
Years	Team	Apps	(Gls)
1968–1970	VfB Peine		
1970–1973	Leu Braunschweig		
1973–1976	1. FC Schweinfurt 05	67	(0)
1976–1978	VfL Osnabrück	65	(0)
1978–1983	Alemannia Aachen	148	(0)
- * Club domestic league appearances and goals as of 17 May 2016

Wolfgang Dramsch (born 22 July 1949) is a retired German football goalkeeper.

He played eight seasons in the 2. Bundesliga with 1. FC Schweinfurt 05, VfL Osnabrück and Alemannia Aachen. In total, he made 280 appearances in the league.
