= Hans Jäcker =

German footballer (1932–2013)

Personal information
- Full name: Johannes Jäcker
- Date of birth: 20 November 1932
- Place of birth: Schwerte, Germany
- Date of death: 7 April 2013 (aged 80)
- Place of death: Stendal, Germany
- Position: Goalkeeper

Youth career
- 1949–1950: VfL Schwerte

Senior career*
Years	Team	Apps	(Gls)
1950–1955	VfL Schwerte		
1955–1956	1. FC Köln		
1956–1967	Eintracht Braunschweig	265	(0)

Managerial career
- 1968–1972: Eintracht Braunschweig (youth)
- –1974: Leu Braunschweig
- * Club domestic league appearances and goals

Hans "Hennes" Jäcker (20 November 1932 – 7 April 2013) was a German football player. He spent 11 years with Eintracht Braunschweig, including four seasons in the Bundesliga starting with the league's foundation in 1963.

After retiring as a player, Jäcker worked as a youth coach at Eintracht Braunschweig and for a time managed Regionalliga Nord side Leu Braunschweig. From 1980 to 1983 he also served as the president of Eintracht Braunschweig.

== Honours ==
- Bundesliga champion: 1966–67
