= SV Algermissen =

German football club

SV Algermissen 11
- Full name: Sportverein von 1911 Algermissen e.V.
- Founded: 1911
- Ground: Sportsplatz am Grasweg
- League: 1. Kreisklasse Hildesheim A (IX)
- 2015–16: 14th
Home colours	Away colours

SV Algermissen is a German football club from the village of Algermissen, Lower Saxony near Hannover. The club was established 5 May 1911 as Fußball-Club Britannia Algermissen. The name Britannia was popular among early German clubs in acknowledgment of the origins of the sport in Great Britain, but fell out of favour after World War I. On 26 December 1918 the club was renamed Sportverein Algermissen 11.

== History ==
The Algermissen side first came to note in the 1932–33 season when they took part in playoff competition in the top flight regional Oberliga Südhannover/Braunschweig. The following season German football was restructured under the Third Reich into 16 first division leagues and SV became part of the Gauliga Niedersachsen (I) where they played as a mid- to upper table side over a handful of campaigns. The team took part in the opening round of the Tschammerpokal, predecessor to the current day DFB-Pokal (German Cup), in 1936 but were quickly eliminated by Werder Bremen. In 1939 they finished their Gauliga in 10th place and were relegated.

Following World War II occupying Allied authorities dissolved most organizations in the country, including sports and football clubs. New clubs were soon formed, often out of the former memberships of weakened pre-war associations. Turn- und Spielverein Algermissen was created on 12 October 1945 through the merger of Turnverein Eintracht Algermissen and Jahnbund Algermissen.

TSV took part in qualification play for the Verbandsliga Niedersachen-Süd (II) but failed in the attempt and instead settled into the Landesliga Niedersachsen/Hildesheim (III). In 1949 they won their way into the Amateuroberliga Niedersachsen-Ost (II), where they played two seasons. An 18th-place result in 1950–51 saw the club sent down. TSV spent most of the rest of the 1950s in the Amateurliga Niedersachsen Staffel V – Göttingen/Hildesheim (III) before slipping into lower-tier play. The club re-adopted the name SV Algermissen on 13 May 1961 and today plays in the tier-nine 1. Kreisklasse Hildesheim.

== Stadium ==
Before moving into the Sportplatz am Grasweg in 1927, the club played at the Sportplatz am Friedhof, with the exception of the 1918–1919 season, when their home field was Günter'sches Gelände.
