= Verbandsliga Norddeutschland =

- Founded: 1913
- Folded: 1914
- Country: German Empire
- Level on pyramid: Level 1
- Last champions: Altona 93

The Verbandsliga Norddeutschland (English: Football Association League Northern Germany) was one of several association football first tier leagues in the German Empire. The league only existed for one season and covered the area administered by the Northern German Football Association.

== History ==
Until 1913 various local championships were played in the area of the Northern Germany, the champions of those qualifying for the Northern German football championship. A unified top level league was finally introduced for the 1913–14 season. The new Verbandsliga Norddeutschland replaced the Northern German championship play-offs and its winners qualified directly for the German football championship.

=== Founding members ===
From Bremen:

- FV Werder Bremen

From the Duchy of Brunswick:

- Eintracht Braunschweig

From the Prussian Province of Hanover:

- Hannover 96
- Eintracht Hannover
- Borussia 04 Harburg^{1}

From Hamburg:

- Eimsbütteler TV
- SC Victoria Hamburg

From the Prussian Province of Schleswig-Holstein:

- Altonaer FC von 1893^{1}
- FC Union 03 Altona^{1}
- Holstein Kiel

^{1} Had previously played in the league pyramid of Hamburg.

Altona 93, Holstein Kiel, Victoria Hamburg, Eintracht Braunschweig, Eimsbütteler TV and Hannover 96 were chosen as participants based on their league positions in 1913, while Werder Bremen, Eintracht Hannover, Borussia Harburg and Union Altona qualified via play-offs. Not represented were the Free City of Lübeck, the Grand Duchy of Mecklenburg-Strelitz, the Grand Duchy of Mecklenburg-Schwerin and the Grand Duchy of Oldenburg.

=== 1913–14 season ===
The ten teams played each other twice, once at home and once away. Altona 93 won the title and qualified for the 1914 German football championship. Union Altona and Werder Bremen were to be relegated to the regional second tier leagues.

| Pos | Team | Pld | W | D | L | GF | GA | GD | Pts |
|---|---|---|---|---|---|---|---|---|---|
| 1 | Altona 93 | 18 | 13 | 3 | 2 | 71 | 22 | +49 | 29 |
| 2 | Holstein Kiel | 18 | 13 | 2 | 3 | 58 | 18 | +40 | 28 |
| 3 | Hannover 96 | 18 | 11 | 1 | 6 | 51 | 35 | +16 | 23 |
| 4 | Eimsbütteler TV | 18 | 9 | 4 | 5 | 35 | 32 | +3 | 22 |
| 5 | Eintracht Braunschweig | 18 | 8 | 5 | 5 | 39 | 38 | +1 | 21 |
| 6 | Eintracht Hannover | 18 | 7 | 3 | 8 | 41 | 46 | −5 | 17 |
| 7 | Borussia Harburg | 18 | 8 | 1 | 9 | 35 | 62 | −27 | 17 |
| 8 | SC Victoria Hamburg | 18 | 5 | 2 | 11 | 34 | 46 | −12 | 12 |
| 9 | Union 03 Altona | 18 | 4 | 1 | 13 | 41 | 52 | −11 | 9 |
| 10 | Werder Bremen | 18 | 1 | 0 | 17 | 12 | 66 | −54 | 2 |

Source: Hardy Grüne, Vom Kronprinzen bis zur Bundesliga 1890-1963. Enzyklopädie des deutschen Ligafußballs. Band 1 (1996) (in German), publisher: Agon-Sportverlag, page: 54

Bremer SC 1891 and Hamburger SV (Note: The current incarnation of Hamburger SV wasn't founded until 1919, but one of their predecessor clubs, Hamburger FC 1888, took on the name of Hamburger SV 1888 in 1914.) won promotion to the 1914–15 Verbandsliga. However, due to the outbreak of World War I only one season of the Verbandsliga was ever played and all teams returned to their local championships, which again would serve as qualifiers for the Northern German championship play-offs.

=== Aftermath ===
After the disestablishment of the league, there were various attempts to merge leagues in Northern Germany again:

In 1920, two new Verbandsligas were created to replace the local championships: a northern group (Nordkreisliga) covering Hamburg and the Province of Schleswig-Holstein, and a southern group (Südkreisliga) covering Brunswick, Bremen and the Province of Hanover. However, after just one season the leagues were split-up again into several smaller Bezirksligas to save costs during hyperinflation.

In 1928–29 a conflict between the clubs and the Northern German FA over a proposed reform of the league pyramid broke out and as a result no regular league matches were played in Northern Germany that season. Some major clubs had demanded the creation of a single, unified top level league in Northern Germany, while smaller clubs had feared to be left out. While some of the big Hamburg and Schleswig-Holstein clubs, including Hamburger SV, Holstein Kiel, and Altona 93, formed a rebel league, most clubs in the southern parts of Northern Germany sat out the season. In the end six Northern German Oberligas were formed as a compromise for the 1929–30 season.

With the rise of the Nazis to power, the Gauligas were introduced as the highest level of football in Germany in 1933. In Northern Germany, the leagues were merged into the Gauliga Niedersachsen and the Gauliga Nordmark. During World War II the Gauligas were split into more regionalized leagues again.

A single top division in Northern Germany was finally reintroduced in 1947 with the creation of the Oberliga Nord.

== See also ==
- Northern German football championship
- Oberliga Nord (1947–63)
