= Werner Thamm =

German footballer

Personal information
- Full name: Werner Thamm
- Date of birth: 24 August 1926
- Place of birth: Kleinkorbetha, Germany
- Date of death: 20 October 1987 (aged 61)
- Position: Striker

Senior career*
Years	Team	Apps	(Gls)
1948–1950	TSV Goslar		
1950–1962	Eintracht Braunschweig	295	(116)
1962–1963	FT Braunschweig		
- * Club domestic league appearances and goals

Werner Thamm (24 August 1926 – 20 October 1987) was a German footballer.

== Career ==
Thamm began his senior career with Amateuroberliga Niedersachsen club TSV Goslar (now Goslarer SC 08), before joining Eintracht Braunschweig in the first division Oberliga Nord in 1950. With 116 goals in 295 league and play-off games Thamm remains the all-time leading goalscorer for Eintracht Braunschweig, the club he spent most of his career with. After twelve years in Braunschweig, Thamm retired from top level play and returned to amateur football for one more season, playing for FT Braunschweig.
