= Bernd Buchheister =

German footballer

Personal information
- Full name: Bernd Buchheister
- Date of birth: 21 September 1962 (age 64)
- Place of birth: Braunschweig, West Germany
- Height: 1.85 m (6 ft 1 in)
- Position: Striker

Senior career*
Years	Team	Apps	(Gls)
–1985	MTV Gifhorn		
1985–1993	Eintracht Braunschweig	255	(74)
1993–1997	SV Lurup		
- * Club domestic league appearances and goals

Bernd Buchheister (born 21 September 1962) is a retired German football player. He played seven seasons in the 2. Bundesliga with Eintracht Braunschweig. With 78 goals in all competitions he remains one of the club's most prolific goalscorers in history.
