= History of the German football league system =

Today, the German football league system consists refers to a series of hierarchically interconnected leagues for association football clubs in Germany, in which all leagues are bound together by the principle of promotion and relegation. As of 2015, the league systems spans up to 14 levels and consists of over 2,300 divisions in total, that stands at the end of a development starting around the year 1900 with different district leagues, was then organized over decades on a regional basis and saw the first edition of a nationwide league as late as 1963.

== Until 1933 ==
Until the foundation of the German Football Association there had already been different regional and district championships' respective leagues and it was not until 1906 that there was a consistent mode to determine the participants of the German championship that was played as a final tournament until the foundation of the Bundesliga. For that reason football in Germany was divided into seven regions which had their own regional championships (that were mostly played as a cup tournament, too). Only the regional champions and the defending German champion were qualified to play in the championship until 1924, when the number of final tournament participants was increased to 16.

As there were no regional top-level league established the system of many parallel leagues and divisions continued up to the 1933–34 season.

From the late 1920s on there were efforts to install a nationwide professional league, but these efforts were never powerful enough to outreach the strong anti-professionalism from conservative and nationalist officials.

Level	Division						
	↑ Winners qualified for German championship tournament						
	↑ Winners qualified for Regional championship tournament	↑ Winners qualified for Regional championship tournament	↑ Winners qualified for Regional championship tournament	↑ Winners qualified for Regional championship tournament	↑ Winners qualified for Regional championship tournament	↑ Winners qualified for Regional championship tournament	↑ Winners qualified for Regional championship tournament
I	North German district divisions	Berlin district divisions	Middle German district divisions	West German district divisions	South German district divisions	Baltic district divisions	Southeast German district divisions

== 1933–1944 ==
National Socialism took power in Germany in January 1933. This also meant the end of attempts to invent professional football in Germany. But the football authorities did restructure and slightly centralise the football competition system. So in 1933 the Gauliga (county league) system was initiated as a system of 16 top-level divisions similar in strength that replaced the more than thirty previous top-level divisions. The champion of each Gauliga was qualified to play in the German championship tournament. With 10 teams each in the Gau leagues, the number of teams in the top flight was 160, a reduction from 400 to 500 teams until then. The number of Gau leagues increased to 31 in 1944, because of league division for economic reasons (transport costs) and territory annexion during World War II.

Level	Division
	↑ Winners qualified for German championship tournament
I	16 and more Gauliga divisions

== 1947–1963 ==
After World War II the Oberliga system developed out of the occupation zone championships. The best teams of the five West German top-level divisions qualified for the German championship tournament. From 1949 until 1991 the German Democratic Republic had its own football league system.

Level	Division				
	↑ Winners and runners-up qualified for German championship tournament				
I	Oberliga Nord	Oberliga Berlin	Oberliga West	Oberliga Südwest	Oberliga Süd

== 1963–1974 ==
Since the late 1920s there had been plans to establish a nationwide professional top-level league, but they all failed because of the opposition by anti-professionalists and the relatively strong regional football associations. In summer 1962, under the influence of the FIFA World Cup quarter final defeat to Yugoslavia, the German Football Association decided to establish the Bundesliga as a nationwide professional football league.

The previous Oberliga became the second level of the German league system, now named Regionalliga. Its five parallel divisions (Nord, West, Südwest, Süd, Stadtliga Berlin) corresponded with the previous Oberliga divisions.

In the first two years the Bundesliga had 16 members but their number was increased to 18 in 1965. Two teams were relegated to the Regionalliga. The first two teams from each Regionalliga division and the champion of West Berlin competed in a promotion tournament in two groups, whose winners were promoted into the Bundesliga.

Level	Division				
I	Bundesliga				
	↑ Winners and runners-up qualified for Bundesliga promotion tournament				
II	Regionalliga Nord	Regionalliga Berlin	Regionalliga West	Regionalliga Südwest	Regionalliga Süd

== 1974–1981 ==
Soon it became obvious that the financial gap between the fully professionalised Bundesliga and the five Regionalliga divisions, where many semi-professional and even amateur-like clubs competed, was too large. Teams relegated from the Bundesliga were often in serious danger of bankruptcy. Some clubs tried to avoid this fate by match fixing, known as the 1971 Bundesliga scandal.

To narrow the gap between pro football and amateur levels, in 1974 a second professional tier was introduced with the 2. Bundesliga, having a North and a South Division with usually 20 clubs each. For the first time in Bundesliga history, the level II division champions gained direct access to the Bundesliga, as the former promotion tournament was disestablished. Instead, even the playoff winner among the two runners-up was also promoted, with relegation from the Bundesliga therefore increased to 3 clubs.

As the Regionalligas were dissolved in 1974, with about one half of the former Regionalliga clubs relegated to their corresponding fully amateur state league pyramids, between 1974 and 1978, several amateur premier leagues, called Amateur-Oberliga, were established in every region, to narrow the gap between professional football and amateur level once more.

Level	Division				
I	Bundesliga				
II	2. Bundesliga Nord			2. Bundesliga Süd	
III	Amateur-Oberliga Nord	Amateur-Oberliga Berlin	Amateur-Oberliga Nordrhein; Amateur-Oberliga Westfalen	Amateur-Oberliga Südwest	Amateur-Oberliga Bayern; Amateur-Oberliga Hessen; Amateur-Oberliga Baden-Württemberg

== 1981–1991 ==
In 1981 the two divisions of the 2nd Bundesliga were merged into one nationwide division with 20 teams.

Level	Division				
I	Bundesliga				
II	2. Bundesliga				
	↑ Winners qualified for 2. Bundesliga promotion tournament north			↑ Winners qualified for 2. Bundesliga promotion tournament south	
III	Amateur-Oberliga Nord	Amateur-Oberliga Berlin	Amateur-Oberliga Nordrhein; Amateur-Oberliga Westfalen	Amateur-Oberliga Südwest	Amateur-Oberliga Bayern; Amateur-Oberliga Hessen; Amateur-Oberliga Baden-Württemberg

== 1991–1994 ==
As the league systems of the Federal Republic of Germany and the German Democratic Republic were merged in 1991, the number of teams competing in the Bundesliga was temporarily increased to 20 and to make room for 24 teams the 2. Bundesliga was again divided into a North and a South division of 12 teams each.

In 1992 the number of competing teams in the Bundesliga was re-decreased to 18 with four teams relegated and only two promoted from the second level. The 2. Bundesliga played one more season with 24 teams in one division before its size was decreased to 20 members in 1993 and 18 teams in 1994.

Level	Division				
I	Bundesliga				
II	2. Bundesliga				
	↑ Winners qualified for 2. Bundesliga promotion tournament				
III	Amateur-Oberliga Nord	NOFV-Oberliga Nord; NOFV-Oberliga Mitte; NOFV-Oberliga Süd	Amateur-Oberliga Nordrhein; Amateur-Oberliga Westfalen	Amateur-Oberliga Südwest	Amateur-Oberliga Bayern; Amateur-Oberliga Hessen; Amateur-Oberliga-Baden Württemberg

== 1994–2000 ==
In 1994 the Regionalliga was re-established at the third-tier of the German football league system. It was divided into four divisions (Nord, Nordost, West/Südwest and Süd). Four teams were promoted to the 2. Bundesliga. At the beginning these were the four division champions, but later the champions of the Nord and Nordost division had to compete in a promotion play-off while one runner-up from the South or West division was promoted additionally.

Level	Division				
I	Bundesliga				
II	2. Bundesliga				
III	Regionalliga Nord; Regionalliga Nordost		Regionalliga West/Südwest		Regionalliga Süd
IV	Oberliga Hamburg/Schleswig-Holstein; Oberliga Niedersachsen/Bremen	NOFV-Oberliga Nord; NOFV-Oberliga Süd	Oberliga Nordrhein; Oberliga Westfalen	Oberliga Südwest	Oberliga Bayern; Oberliga Hessen; Oberliga Baden-Württemberg

== 2000–2008 ==
From 2000 until 2008 there were two Regionalliga divisions (Nord and Süd), the champions and runners-up of each division were promoted to the 2. Bundesliga.

Level	Division				
I	Bundesliga				
II	2. Bundesliga				
III	Regionalliga Nord			Regionalliga Süd	
IV	Oberliga Hamburg/Schleswig-Holstein; Oberliga Niedersachsen/Bremen	NOFV-Oberliga Nord; NOFV-Oberliga Süd	Oberliga Nordrhein; Oberliga Westfalen	Oberliga Südwest	Oberliga Bayern; Oberliga Hessen; Oberliga Baden-Württemberg

== 2008–2012 ==
In 2006, the German Football Association decided to establish a further nationwide league at the third level of the German football league system starting with the 2008–09 season. This 3. Liga consists of 20 teams. In the starting season the league consisted of the four lowest-ranked teams of the 2. Bundesliga after the 2007–08 season and the 3rd to 10th-place finishers in both the Regionalliga Nord and the Regionalliga Süd after 2007–08 season.

The champions and the runners-up of the 3. Liga are promoted to the 2. Bundesliga. The third placed team starts in a home and away play-off against the third-last team of the 2. Bundesliga. The teams finishing 18th to 20th in the 3. Liga are relegated to the Regionalliga.

The Regionalliga was continued with an additional division (West) as fourth level of the league system. 54 teams compete in three regional divisions (North, West, South) of 18 teams each. These 54 teams consist of those Regionalliga teams that did not qualify for the 3. Liga after the 2007–08 season and additional teams from Oberliga feeders. Starting in 2008–09, the winner of each Regionalliga division will be promoted to the 3. Liga.

Level	Division				
I	Bundesliga				
II	2. Bundesliga				
III	3. Liga				
IV	Regionalliga Nord		Regionalliga West		Regionalliga Süd
V	Bremen-Liga; Oberliga Hamburg; Oberliga Niedersachsen; Schleswig-Holstein-Liga	NOFV-Oberliga Nord; NOFV-Oberliga Süd	NRW-Liga	Oberliga Südwest	Bayernliga; Hessenliga; Oberliga Baden-Württemberg

== 2012–2017 ==
Starting from the 2012–13 season, the Regionalliga was expanded to five regional divisions. The Northern Division was split into a Northern Division and a North-Eastern Division. The Western and the Southern Division were divided into a Western Division, a South/South-Western Division and a Bavarian Division. The five Division winners along with the runner-up of the South-Western Division will compete for 3 promotions spots to the 3. Liga in a play-off round.

Level	Division				
I	Bundesliga				
II	2. Bundesliga				
III	3. Liga				
	↑ Winners and Southwest runner-up qualified for 3. Liga promotion playoffs				
IV	Regionalliga Nord	Regionalliga Nordost	Regionalliga West	Regionalliga Südwest	Regionalliga Bayern
V	Bremen-Liga; Oberliga Hamburg; Oberliga Niedersachsen; Schleswig-Holstein-Liga	NOFV-Oberliga Nord; NOFV-Oberliga Süd	Oberliga Mittelrhein; Oberliga Niederrhein; Oberliga Westfalen	Hessenliga; Oberliga Baden-Württemberg; Oberliga Rheinland-Pfalz/Saar	Bayernliga Nord; Bayernliga Süd

== From 2017 ==
Since the 2017–18 season, the Schleswig-Holstein-Liga is now Oberliga Schleswig-Holstein.

Level	Division				
I	Bundesliga				
II	2. Bundesliga				
III	3. Liga				
	↑ Winners and Southwest runner-up qualify for 3. Liga promotion playoffs				
IV	Regionalliga Nord	Regionalliga Nordost	Regionalliga West	Regionalliga Südwest	Regionalliga Bayern
V	Bremen-Liga; Niedersachsenliga; Oberliga Hamburg; Oberliga Schleswig-Holstein	NOFV-Oberliga Nord; NOFV-Oberliga Süd	Oberliga Mittelrhein; Oberliga Niederrhein; Oberliga Westfalen	Hessenliga; Oberliga Baden-Württemberg; Oberliga Rheinland-Pfalz/Saar	Bayernliga Nord; Bayernliga Süd

== Scheme ==
	Germany	Germany	West Germany	West Germany	West Germany	Germany	Germany	East Germany
Level	2008–	1994–2008	1974–1994	1963–1974	1945–1963	1933–1945	1903–1932	DDR 1949–1991
I	Bundesliga	Bundesliga	Bundesliga	Bundesliga	Oberliga	Gauliga	Verbandsliga	DDR Oberliga
II	2.Bundesliga	2.Bundesliga	2.Bundesliga	Regionalliga	2.Oberliga	Bezirksklasse	Bezirksliga	DDR Liga
III	3.Liga	Regionalliga	Am. Oberliga	1. Amateurliga	1. Amateurliga	Kreisliga	▼ ???	DDR 2.Liga
IV	Regionalliga	Oberliga	Verbandsliga	2. Amateurliga	2. Amateurliga	1. Kreisklasse		Bezirksliga
V	Oberliga	Verbandsliga/Landesliga ¹	Landesliga	Bezirksklasse	Bezirksklasse	2. Kreisklasse		Bezirksklasse
VI	Verbandsliga/Landesliga¹	Landesliga/Bezirksoberliga	Bezirksliga	1. Kreisklasse	1. Kreisklasse			Kreisliga
VII	Landesliga/Bezirksoberliga	Bezirksliga	Kreisliga ²	2. Kreisklasse	2. Kreisklasse			1.Kreisklasse
VIII	Bezirksliga	Kreisliga ²	Kreisklasse A ²	3. Kreisklasse	3. Kreisklasse			2.Kreisklasse
IX	Kreisliga ²	Kreisklasse A ²	Kreisklasse B ²
X	Kreisklasse A ²	Kreisklasse B ²	Kreisklasse C ²
XI	Kreisklasse B ²	Kreisklasse C ²
XII	Kreisklasse C ²

¹ in some areas called Landesliga, in others Verbandsliga.

² in some areas called Kreisliga A, Kreisliga B, Kreisliga C and Kreisliga D or 1. Kreisklasse, 2. Kreisklasse and 3. Kreisklasse.

The league structure has shifted frequently and typically reflects the degree of participation in the sport in various parts of the country. In the early 1990s, changes were driven by German reunification and the subsequent integration of the national leagues of East and West Germany. All these levels are interconnected by way of promotion and relegation. The next diagram shows how this works for the first five levels. Note that the actual number of clubs being promoted and relegated below the Regionalliga level is frequently subject to change by the German Football Association.
