= VfB Rot-Weiß 04 Braunschweig =

German football club

- Full name: VfB Rot-Weiß 04 Braunschweig e.V.
- Founded: 1904
- Ground: Georg-Weber-Stadion Madamenweg
- League: Bezirksliga
- 2026/27: 2nd
Home colours	Away colours

VfB Rot-Weiß 04 Braunschweig is a German association football club from the city of Braunschweig in Lower Saxony and is part of a larger sports club with departments for youth football, gymnastics, team handball, table tennis, volleyball, badminton.

== History ==
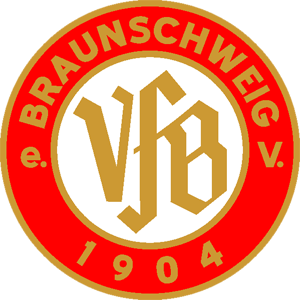
Historical logo of VfB Braunschweig ca. 1931

The club was founded as FC Einigkeit Braunschweig on 16 April 1904 and on 14 September 1905 merged with FC Viktoria 05 Braunschweig to form Braunschweiger FV 05. This club merged with FC Vorwärts 1908 Braunschweig to become FC Sportfreunde Braunschweig on 7 September 1912. FC Sportfreunde then joined Sportverein 07 Braunschweig on 1 January 1919 to create VfB 1904 Braunschweig.

From 1907 to 1914, SV had played as FC Britannia Braunschweig, acknowledging the roots of the game in Britain, until the club changed its name with the onset of World War I when that country became a wartime foe. In 1907, SV was joined by FC Germania Braunschweig which was a founding club of the German Football Association in Leipzig in 1900.

From 1921 to 1933, the club played in the first-tier Oberliga Südhannover/Braunschweig. In 1933, VfB missed out on qualification for the newly formed Gauliga Niedersachsen and played mostly lower level regional football from then on. However, the club made a fleeting appearance (1943–44) in the war-weakened first division Gauliga Südhannover-Braunschweig which was formed in 1942 after the split of the Gauliga Niedersachsen.

Following World War II the club became SV Rot-Weiß Braunschweig and fused with SV Brunswiek 1936 Braunschweig to play the 1945–46 season in the Oberliga Niedersachsen Süd (I) as VfB Brunswiek 04 Braunschweig. They resumed their identity as SV Rot-Weiß the following year and slipped into lower-tier competition. In 1953 the club again changed its name, this time to VfB Rot-Weiß 04 Braunschweig. They currently play in the Bezirksiga Braunschweig (VII).

== Honours ==
The club's honours:

- Gauliga Südhannover-Braunschweig (I):
  - Runners-up (1): 1944
- Free State of Brunswick championship (I):
  - Champions (1): 1919
  - Runners-up (1): 1920
- Landesliga Niedersachsen, Staffel Braunschweig (II):
  - Champions (1): 1949
- Amateurliga Niedersachsen, Staffel 4 (Braunschweig) (III):
  - Runners-up (1): 1957

== Boxing ==
Rot-Weiß Braunschweig has also been successful in boxing. The club's greatest success came in 1948, when Willi Hampel won the German welterweight championship, representing Rot-Weiß.
