= Frank Plagge =

German footballer and manager

Personal information
- Full name: Frank Plagge
- Date of birth: 18 April 1963 (age 63)
- Height: 1.71 m (5 ft 7 1/2 in)
- Position: Striker

Youth career
- 1971–1981: SV Grün-Weiß Calberlah

Senior career*
Years	Team	Apps	(Gls)
1981–1984	MTV Gifhorn	88	(48)
1984–1986	Eintracht Braunschweig	63	(15)
1986–1992	VfL Wolfsburg	155	(103)
1992–1993	SV Grün-Weiß Calberlah		
1993–1995	VfL Wolfsburg	7	(0)
1995–1997	MTV Gifhorn		
1998	TSG Mörse		
1998–2000	SV Brunsrode/Flechtorf		

Managerial career
- 1992–1993: SV Grün-Weiß Calberlah
- 1996–2000: SV Grün-Weiß Calberlah (youth)
- 2000–2002: VfL Wolfsburg II (assistant)
- 2002–2006: VfL Wolfsburg (youth)
- 2007–2010: SV Grün-Weiß Calberlah
- * Club domestic league appearances and goals as of 27 April 2012

Frank Plagge (born 18 April 1963) is a retired German footballer and manager. As a player, he spent one season in the Bundesliga with Eintracht Braunschweig, as well as three seasons in the 2. Bundesliga with Braunschweig and VfL Wolfsburg.
