= TuS Komet Arsten =

German football club

- Full name: Turn- und Sportverein Komet Arsten e.V.
- Founded: 2006
- League: Landesliga Bremen (VI)
- 2015–16: Bezirksliga Bremen (VII), 2nd (promoted)
- Website: https://www.tuskometarsten.de

TuS Komet Arsten is a German football club from the district of Arsten, in the city of Bremen in northwestern Germany. It was established in 2006 through the merger of TuS Arsten and VfB Komet Arsten, both of which appeared in second-division play after World War II.

== History ==
=== VfB Komet Arsten ===
Predecessor Komet Arsten was formed in 1896 out of the earlier sides Germania Arsten and Brema Arsten and joined Verein für Bewegungsspiele Arsten in 1919 to create VfB Komet Arsten.

By 1926 the club had nearly 600 members in departments for football, athletics, fistball, gymnastics, and swimming. They earned their first honours three years later by defeating SV Werder Bremen to capture the district cup.

In 1953 the team advanced to play in the Amateurliga Bremen (II) for a two-season turn. They won promotion again in 1957 and played as a lower table side until sent down in 1963. The club merged with Verein für Rasenspiele 1913 Arsten to become Sportclub Rot-Weiß Bremen in 1971. Rot-Weiß appeared in the fourth tier Verbandsliga Bremen for two seasons from 1975 to 1977 and the following year re-adopted the name Komet.

The team enjoyed its best years in the early 1980s. After returning to the Verbandsliga Bremen (IV) in 1978, Komet earned several upper table finishes with their best result coming in 1982–83 when they finished in third place, just four points out of first. The club was sent down again in 1986 and had its last turn in fourth-tier play from 1988 to 1992.

=== TuS Arsten ===
The formation of TuS Arsten brought together several of the district's earliest gymnastics and sports clubs. The association was established in 1948 as Turnverein Arsten out of the memberships of ATV Jahn Arsten, Sportverein Einigkeit Arsten and TV Weserstrand Arsten.

In 1901 the district's first gymnastics club was formed as Pyramiden und Akrobaten Club Frisch auf Arsten before being renamed Arbeiter Turnverein Jahn Arsten in 1903. A second gymnastics club called TV Weserstrand Arsten was established in 1911. A football department was formed within ATV in 1919 before part of the club's membership left to form a separate sports club known as Sportvereins Einigkeit Arsten-Habenhausen just three years later.

Seen as a left-leaning worker's club, ATV was banned in 1933 under the Nazi regime as politically unpalatable and the membership reorganized as TuS Arsten. Following World War II and the fall of the Third Reich, occupying Allied authorities banned most organizations in the country including sports and football clubs; TV Arsten was remade three years after the conflict and played a single season in the short-lived postwar Amateurliga Nord (II) in 1947–48.

The club was renamed Turn- und Sportverein Arsten in 1952 and the following year became part of the Amateurliga Bremen (II) where they would compete as a lower table side until being sent down in 1957.
