= Northern German football championship =

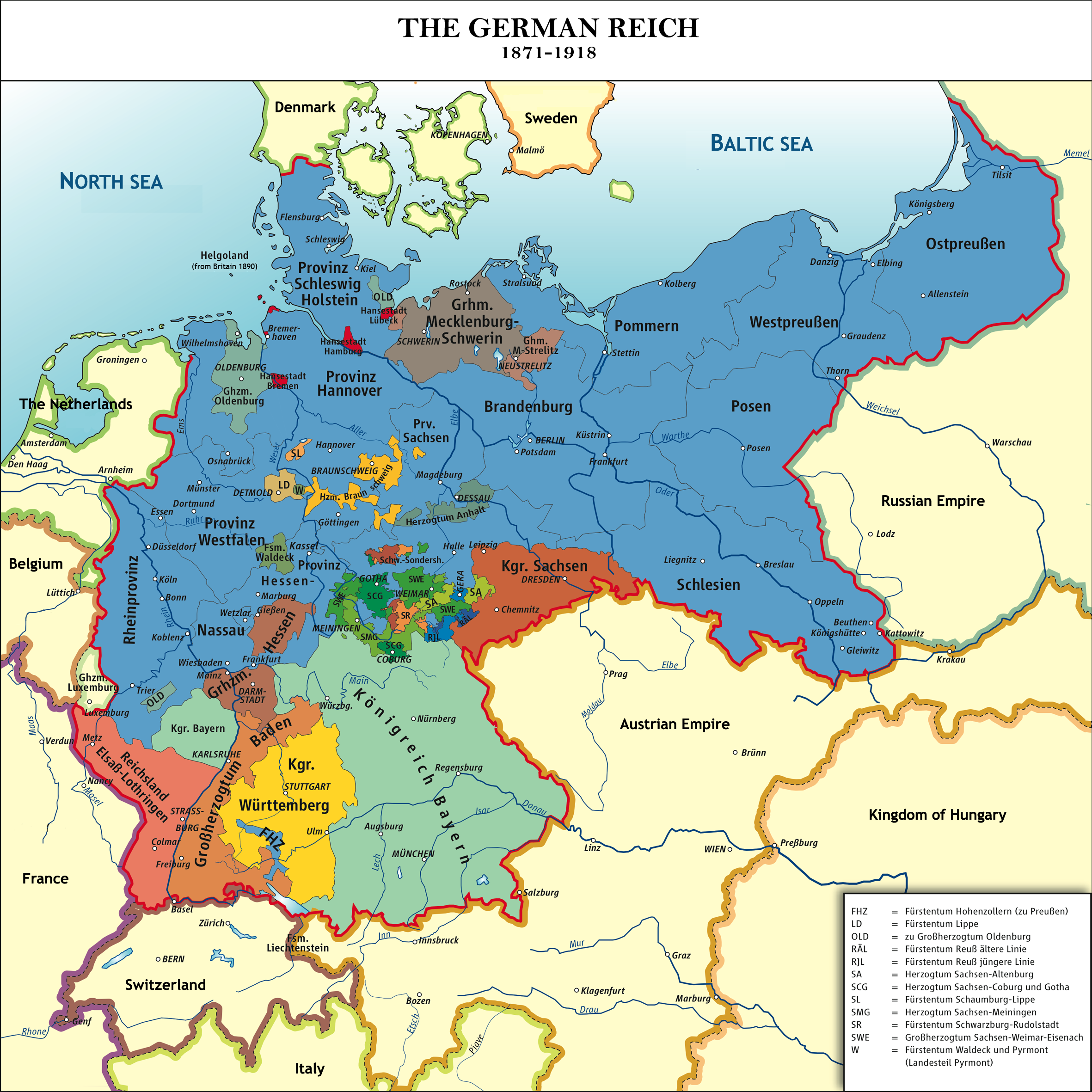
- Founded: 1906
- Abolished: 1933
- Region: Northern Germany
- Last champions: Hamburger SV

The Northern German football championship (German: Norddeutsche Fußballmeisterschaft), operated by the Northern German Football Association (German: Norddeutscher Fußball-Verband (NFV), was the highest association football competition in Northern Germany, in the Prussian provinces of Schleswig-Holstein and Hanover and the German states of Hamburg, Lübeck, Mecklenburg-Schwerin, Mecklenburg-Strelitz, Oldenburg, Bremen and the Duchy of Brunswick. The regional associations, including the NFV, were dissolved in 1933 and the competition was not held again until 1946.

== Overview ==
German football was, from its beginnings, divided into regional associations, each of which carried out their own championship matches. These often pre-dated the national German championship. With the inception of the latter in 1903, the former became qualifying tournaments. Regional championships still held a high value for the local clubs. The most important of these regional championships were:

- Southern German football championship - formed in 1898
- Brandenburg football championship - formed in 1898
- Central German football championship - formed in 1902
- Western German football championship - formed in 1903
- March football championship - existed from 1903 to 1911
- Northern German football championship - formed in 1906
- South Eastern German football championship - formed in 1906
- Baltic football championship - formed in 1908

Regional championships were suspended with the rise of the Nazis to power in 1933. At the end of the Second World War, some resumed, but in league format. In the North, a championship had been started in the summer of 1946 but it had to be stopped during the quarter-finals when the British Military Government intervened. Subsequently, the Oberliga Nord was established in 1947. Others, such as the Baltic championship, completely disappeared because the territories they were held in were no longer part of Germany. With the South West German football championship, a new regional competition also appeared in 1945 in the French Zone. Ultimately, with the formation of the Bundesliga, regional championships ceased altogether.

== History ==
=== Background ===
When the Northern German championship was established in 1906, the region of Northern Germany (German: Norddeutschland) was politically divided into a number of territories, the first two being part of the Kingdom of Prussia:

- Province of Hanover
- Province of Schleswig-Holstein
- Bremen
- Duchy of Brunswick
- Hamburg
- Lübeck
- Grand Duchy of Mecklenburg-Strelitz
- Grand Duchy of Mecklenburg-Schwerin
- Grand Duchy of Oldenburg

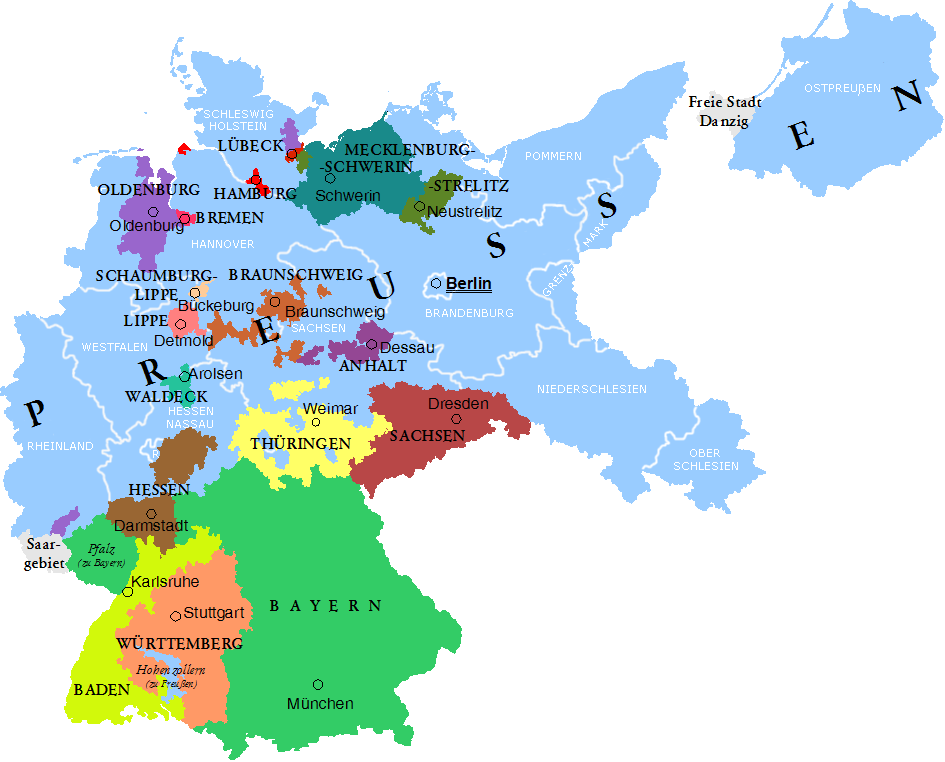
States of Germany in 1925

With the defeat of the German Empire in 1918 and the formation of a Republic, the former Kingdoms and Principalities became states. For the two Prussian provinces, this only meant that the Kingdom was replaced with the Free State of Prussia, while the Free Cities remained as they were. The former Principalities became free states:

- Province of Hanover
- Province of Schleswig-Holstein
- Bremen
- Free State of Brunswick
- Hamburg
- Lübeck
- Free State of Mecklenburg-Strelitz
- Free State of Mecklenburg-Schwerin
- Free State of Oldenburg

All this, however, was not really relevant in the field of football because from the start, most regional associations ignored Länder (state) boundaries and established themselves within reasonable geographic regions (e.g. there was never a Prussian Football Federation). The very first federation in the North, inaugurated in 1894, incorporated clubs from Hamburg (Free Hanseatic City) as well as Altona and Wandsbek (both of which were Prussian). This policy was encouraged after the foundation of Deutscher Fußball-Bund (DFB) in 1900 and maintained throughout Germany although the regional federations were later called Landesverbände (state associations) which they weren't.

=== Football association ===
The Northern German Football Association (NFV, see above) was formed on 15 April 1905, thereby in cooperating six regional associations:

- Hamburg-Altonaer Fussball Bund - formed 20 October 1894
- Verband Bremer Ballspielvereine - 1 April 1899
- Verband Kieler Ballspielvereine - 25 February 1903
- Hannoverscher Assoziations-Verband - 1 July 1903
- Fussballbund für das Herzogtum Braunschweig - 7 May 1904
- Mecklenburger Fussball-Verband - 18 December 1904

Two others could not, or did not, join as the

- Fussball Verband an der Unterweser - 14 March 1900

was defunct at the time whereas the clubs in the

- Verband Hannoverscher Fussball-Vereine - 1 July 1903

played Rugby.

== Competition ==
=== 1906 to 1914 ===
The Northern German football championship was first contested in 1906 and won by Victoria Hamburg. Six clubs had qualified and the final stages were held as a knock-out competition with a one-off final at the end. The winner of this first competition then took part in the fourth edition of the national German championship. Northern German clubs had already taken part in each of the previous three national championships.

To qualify for the Northern German championship, a club had to take out the title in its local or district competition or league. This remained unchanged through 1920 (with the one exception of the 1913–14 season) but, as more football clubs were formed in Germany and the NFV grew bigger, the number of its districts increased and thereby also the numbers of clubs taking part in the Northern championship.

The second edition was played out in the same modus but now with eight clubs, a system that remained in place for the following seasons. The northern champions experienced some first national success in 1910, when Holstein Kiel reached the German final, to lose 1–0 to Karlsruher FV. In 1912, the Holstein returned to the national final once more and became the first northern club to win it, this time beating Karlsruher FV 1–0.

In its last pre-First World War season, 1914, the competition became a regional league (Verbandsliga Norddeutschland or Norddeutsche Liga). Ten clubs played a home-and-away season to determine the northern champions, an unusual concentration of clubs in one league for Germany at the time, where leagues were very much sub-regional, with regional leagues existing in Brandenburg but nowhere else.

=== 1914 to 1918 ===
In 1914–15, football in Germany had come to an almost complete halt. As it became clear, that the war would last longer than anticipated, local competitions restarted in 1915. In most regions of Germany, like the South, the championships were restarted from 1915 onwards but in the North, this was not so. A northern championship was played in 1916 again, but only for selections, not clubs. In 1917, a club championship was played once more but in 1918, the competition returned to selections rather than clubs.

=== 1919 to 1933 ===
The Northern German championship resumed in 1919, as a knockout competition, with eleven clubs, enlarged to twelve the year after.

In 1921, the competition returned to a league format. Two divisions, a northern and a southern, with ten clubs each, played a home-and-away format. The two divisional champions then played for the northern championship in a two-leg final. The competition was, for the first time, won by a new force in German football, the Hamburger SV. The club became the most dominating team in the competition from then on, also reaching the national final in 1922, 1923, 1924 and 1928. In 1923 and 1928, it won the championship, in 1922, no champions was determined and only in 1924 did the club actually lose the finals game. Apart from HSV, only Holstein Kiel could achieve success in the north, reaching the German final for a third time in 1930 but losing to Hertha BSC Berlin.

The Northern German championship changed its system to determine the champion once more in 1922, when seven clubs played a league format with a single round only. In 1923, a knock-out format was used once more, in 1924, five clubs played a championship round.

From then on, league formats were used, where every club met the other only once, with varying numbers of clubs involved, four in 1929, 1930, 1931, 1932, 1933, five in 1924, 1926, 1927, six in 1925 and seven in 1928. From 1925, the German championship was enlarged and the runners-up of Northern Germany were also qualified for the national competition.

=== Aftermath ===
The Northern German championship was replaced with two regional Gauligen by the Nazis in 1933, the Gauliga Niedersachsen and Gauliga Nordmark. In the era that followed, the clubs from Northern Germany saw only limited success in the national finals, Hannover 96 taking out the title in 1938 and the German Luftwaffe team LSV Hamburg losing the 1944 final against Dresdner SC.

After the end of the Second World War, Germany remained divided until 1991 and the new Oberliga Nord, formed in 1947, became the replacement for the old Northern German championship. It did, however, not include the clubs from Mecklenburg any more as those now became part of the East German football league system.

== Northern German football champions ==
Season	Winner	Runner-Up	Result
1906	Victoria Hamburg	Eintracht Braunschweig	5–2
1907	Victoria Hamburg	Eintracht Braunschweig	6–1
1908	Eintracht Braunschweig	Victoria Hamburg	3–1
1909	Altonaer FC 93	Eintracht Braunschweig	6–3
1910	Holstein Kiel	Werder Bremen	7–1
1911	Holstein Kiel	Eintracht Braunschweig	6–1
1912	Holstein Kiel	Eintracht Braunschweig	3–2
1913	Eintracht Braunschweig	Victoria Hamburg	3–2
1914	Altonaer FC 93	Holstein Kiel	N/A
1915	Not held		
1916	Hamburg-Altona	Hannover	5–1
1917	Borussia Harburg	Marine SC Wilhelmshaven	4–1
1918	Hamburg-Altona	Wilhelmshaven	9–1
1919	KV Victoria/Hamburg 88	Bremer SC	2–0
1920	Arminia Hannover	Borussia Harburg	2–1
1921	Hamburger SV	Hannover 96	3–1 / 8–0
1922	Hamburger SV	Holstein Kiel	N/A
1923	Hamburger SV	Holstein Kiel	2–0
1924	Hamburger SV	Eintracht Braunschweig	N/A
1925	Hamburger SV	Altonaer FC 93	2–1
1926	Holstein Kiel	Hamburger SV	N/A
1927	Holstein Kiel	Hamburger SV	N/A
1928	Hamburger SV	Holstein Kiel	N/A
1929	Hamburger SV	Holstein Kiel	N/A
1930	Holstein Kiel	Arminia Hannover	N/A
1931	Hamburger SV	Holstein Kiel	N/A
1932	Hamburger SV	Holstein Kiel	N/A
1933	Hamburger SV	Arminia Hannover	N/A

=== Winners and runners-up of the Oberliga Nord (1947–63) ===
The Oberliga Nord, formed in 1947, is considered to be a continuation of the Northern German football championship. It only included teams from West Germany and was disbanded with the introduction of the Fußball-Bundesliga in 1963. This event marked the end of the Northern German football championship.

Season	Winner	Runner-Up
1947–48	Hamburger SV	FC St. Pauli
1948–49	Hamburger SV	FC St. Pauli
1949–50	Hamburger SV	FC St. Pauli
1950–51	Hamburger SV	FC St. Pauli
1951–52	Hamburger SV	VfL Osnabrück
1952–53	Hamburger SV	Holstein Kiel
1953–54	Hannover 96	FC St. Pauli
1954–55	Hamburger SV	TuS Bremerhaven 93
1955–56	Hamburger SV	Hannover 96
1956–57	Hamburger SV	Holstein Kiel
1957–58	Hamburger SV	Eintracht Braunschweig
1958–59	Hamburger SV	Werder Bremen
1959–60	Hamburger SV	Werder Bremen
1960–61	Hamburger SV	Werder Bremen
1961–62	Hamburger SV	Werder Bremen
1962–63	Hamburger SV	Werder Bremen

- Bold Denotes team went on to win German Championship.
