= Gauliga Niedersachsen =

Gauliga Niedersachsen Gauliga Südhannover-Braunschweig Gauliga Osthannover Gauliga Weser-Ems
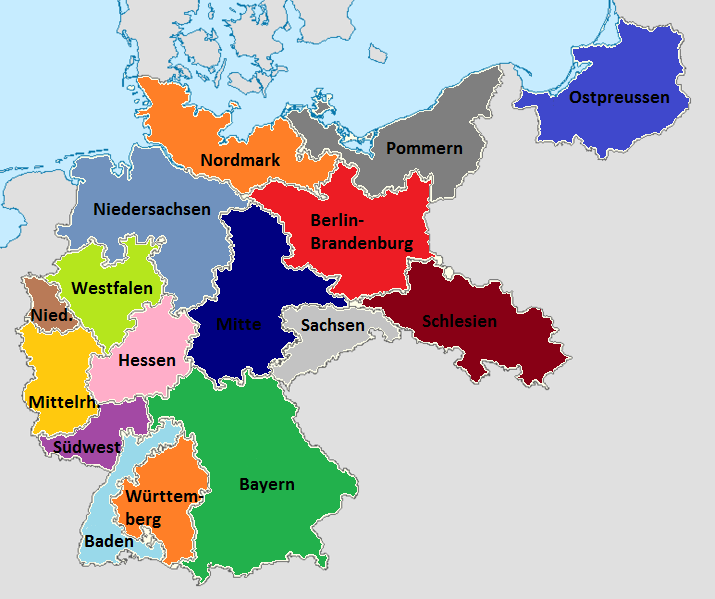
- Founded: 1933
- Folded: 1945
- Replaced by: Oberliga Nord
- Country: Nazi Germany
- Provinces and States: Province of Hanover; Free State of Oldenburg; Free State of Brunswick; Free State of Schaumburg-Lippe; Bremen
- Gau (from 1934): Gau Südhannover-Braunschweig; Gau Ost-Hannover; Gau Weser-Ems
- Level on pyramid: Level 1
- Domestic cup: Tschammerpokal
- Last champions: Gauliga Südhannover-Braunschweig: Eintracht Braunschweig (1943–44); Gauliga Osthannover: Wehrmacht SV Celle (1943–44); Gauliga Weser-Ems: SpVgg Wilhelmshaven 05 (1943–44)

The Gauliga Niedersachsen was the highest football league in the Prussian Province of Hanover and the German states of Bremen, Brunswick, Schaumburg-Lippe and Oldenburg from 1933 to 1945. Shortly after the formation of the league, the Nazis reorganised the administrative regions in Germany, and the Gaue Südhannover-Braunschweig, Ost-Hannover and Weser-Ems de facto replaced the Prussian province and the German states in the region of Lower Saxony (German:Niedersachsen), although de jure the old states continued to exist.

From 1942, the Gauliga Niedersachsen was split into two separate leagues, the Gauliga Südhannover-Braunschweig and the Gauliga Weser-Ems. In turn, the Gauliga Osthannover was separated from the Gauliga Südhannover-Braunschweig in 1943.

== Overview ==
=== Gauliga Niedersachsen ===
The league was introduced by the Nazi Sports Office in 1933, after the Nazi takeover of power in Germany. It replaced the Oberliga Südhannover/Braunschweig and Oberliga Weser/Jade as the highest level of play of the regional football competitions.

The league's success on a national scale was moderate. The surprising victory of Hannover 96 in the 1938 championship over the all-dominating Schalke 04 with a 4–3 extra time win in the replay final remained the only triumph for the region.

In its first season, the league had ten clubs, playing each other once at home and once away. The league champion then qualified for the German championship. The bottom two teams were relegated. The season after, the league was upsized to eleven teams due to the integration of Viktoria Wilhelmsburg, the club coming across from the Gauliga Nordmark. The 1934–35 and 1935–36 seasons were therefore played with eleven teams and three relegation spots. From 1936, the league returned to ten clubs.

Due to the outbreak of World War II in 1939, the league was split into two regional groups of six clubs each. The two group champions then played a home-and-away final for the Gauliga championship. This modus remained for the 1940–41 season.

In its last season, 1941–42, the league remained divided into two regional groups but instead of a two team final, a championship-round of six teams was played. At the end of this season, the league was split into two separate Gauligas.

=== Gauliga Südhannover-Braunschweig ===
The territory of the new Gauliga Südhannover-Braunschweig was made up of the area of the Gau Southern Hanover-Brunswick and the Gau Eastern Hanover.

The league started with ten clubs in a single division in 1942. It remained at this strength for the 1943–44 season but lost one club, the Wehrmacht SV Celle, to the new Gauliga Osthannover.

Due to the arrival of the war on Germany's borders, the last season, 1944–45, was barely started. It was meant to operate in eight regional groups.

=== Gauliga Weser-Ems ===
The territory of the new Gauliga Weser-Ems was made up of the area of the Gau of the same name.

The league started out with ten clubs in a single division. The 1943–44 season was then played in three regional groups of uneven strength, with 23 clubs altogether and a three-team finals round.

The last season saw the same modus but 24 clubs. Play did not get under way very far, and most clubs only played two or three games before the league was dissolved.

=== Gauliga Osthannover ===
The league begun play as an offshoot of the Gauliga Südhannover-Braunschweig in 1943 in the area of the Gau Eastern Hanover with eight teams in a single division. The league only played one complete season.

In its second season, it was expanded to twelve teams in two groups of six. However, no club absolved more than two games before the effects of the war led to the cancellation of the league.

=== Aftermath ===
With the end of the Nazi era, the Gauligas ceased to exist and the northern part of Germany found itself in the British occupation zone. Only the state Free Hanseatic City of Bremen was not part of this zone as it was awarded to the US forces as a port for their otherwise landlocked occupation zone in Southern Germany.

In the British zone and Bremen, top-level football did not resume straight away, unlike in Southern Germany, and only in 1947 a new, highest league was introduced, the Oberliga Nord, which covered the new states of Lower Saxony and Schleswig-Holstein along with the recreated city-states of Hamburg and Bremen.

== Founding members of the league ==
The ten founding members and their league positions in the Oberliga Südhannover/Braunschweig and Oberliga Weser/Jade in 1932–33 were:

- SV Werder Bremen, 2. Oberliga Weser/Jade
- Arminia Hannover, champions Oberliga Südhannover/Braunschweig
- SV Algermissen 11, 2nd Oberliga Südhannover/Braunschweig
- Hannover 96, 3rd Oberliga Südhannover/Braunschweig
- Eintracht Braunschweig, 6th Oberliga Südhannover/Braunschweig
- VfB Komet Bremen, champions Oberliga Weser/Jade
- Bremer SV, 3rd Oberliga Weser/Jade
- Rasen SV Hildesheim 06, 5th Oberliga Südhannover/Braunschweig
- VfB 04 Peine, 4th Oberliga Südhannover/Braunschweig
- 1. SC Göttingen 05, qualified from the Hessen/Hannover division

== Winners and runners-up of the league ==
The winners and runners-up of the league:

=== Gauliga Niedersachsen ===
Season	Winner	Runner-Up
1933–34	Werder Bremen	Arminia Hannover
1934–35	Hannover 96	Werder Bremen
1935–36	Werder Bremen	Hannover 96
1936–37	Werder Bremen	Arminia Hannover
1937–38	Hannover 96	VfL Osnabrück
1938–39	VfL Osnabrück	Hannover 96
1939–40	VfL Osnabrück	Hannover 96
1940–41	Hannover 96	VfL Osnabrück
1941–42	Werder Bremen	LSV Wolfenbüttel

=== Gauliga Südhannover-Braunschweig ===
Season	Winner	Runner-Up
1942–43	Eintracht Braunschweig	Wehrmacht SV Celle
1943–44	Eintracht Braunschweig	VfB 04 Braunschweig

=== Gauliga Weser-Ems ===
Season	Winner	Runner-Up
1942–43	SpVgg Wilhelmshaven 05	Werder Bremen
1943–44	SpVgg Wilhelmshaven 05	ASV Blumenthal

=== Gauliga Osthannover ===
Season	Winner	Runner-Up
1943–44	Wehrmacht SV Celle	Cuxhavener SV

== Placings in the league (1933–1944) ==
The complete list of all clubs participating in the league:

=== Gauliga Niedersachsen ===
Club	1934	1935	1936	1937	1938	1939	1940 ^{3}	1941 ^{3}	1942 ^{4}
SV Werder Bremen	**1**	2	**1**	**1**	3	4	2	2	**1**
Arminia Hannover	2	3	6	2	5	9	3	3	4
SV Algermissen 11	3	5	3	4	6	10			
Hannover 96	4	**1**	2	3	**1**	2	1	**1**	**5**
Eintracht Braunschweig	5	4	4	6	4	3	2	2	**3**
Komet Bremen	6	7	10						
Bremer SV	7	11					6		
Hildesheim 06	8	8	9				5	6	
VfB Peine	9		5	7	8	6	6		
SC Göttingen 05	10			10				5	6
Borussia Harburg ^{1} ^{2}		6	7	5					
SpVgg Hannover 1897		9							
Viktoria Wilhelmsburg ^{1}		10							
Rasensport Harburg			8	9					
VfL Osnabrück			11		2	**1**	**1**	1	**6**
FV Wilhelmsburg 09 ^{2}				8					
ASV Blumenthal					7	7	4	5	6
Germania Wolfenbüttel					9				
LV Linden 07					10		4	4	5
MSV Bückenburg						5			
MSV Lüneburg						8			
SpVgg Wilhelmshaven 05							3	3	**4**
SV Schinkel 04							5	4	4
Tura Gröpelingen								6	
LSV Wolfenbüttel									**2**
TuS Osnabrück 97									5

- ^{1} Moved from the Gauliga Nordmark to the Gauliga Niedersachsen in 1934.
- ^{2} Moved from the Gauliga Niedersachsen to the Gauliga Nordmark in 1937.
- ^{3} Played in two groups, North and South, with a championship play-off between the two group winners at the end.
- ^{4} Played in two groups, North and South, with a six team championship play-off at the end. Placings in the play-off round in **bold**.

=== Gauliga Weser-Ems ===
Club	1943	1944
SpVgg Wilhelmshaven 05	**1**	**1**
SV Werder Bremen	2	4
TuS Osnabrück 97	3	2
Bremer SV	4	6
TuS Bremerhaven 93	5	
Sportfreunde Bremen	6	8
SV Schinkel 04	7	3
VfL Osnabrück	8	1
ASV Blumenthal	9	1
VfB Oldenburg	10	6
Blau-Weiß Varel		2
LSV Ahlhorn		3
Braker SV		4
TuS Aurich		5
VfL Oldenburg		7
KMW Wilhelmshaven		8
Viktoria Oldenburg		9
FV Wolmertshausen		2
Tura Bremen		3
Komet Bremen		5
BV Grohn		7
Reichsbahn Osnabrück		4
VfR Osnabrück		5
Reichsbahn Cloppenburg		6

=== Gauliga Südhannover-Braunschweig ===
Club	1943	1944
Eintracht Braunschweig	**1**	**1**
WSV Celle	2	
Arminia Hannover	3	4
Hildesheim 07	4	3
Hannover 96	5	5
LV Linden 07	6	10
LSV Wolfenbüttel	7	8
SpVgg Göttingen	8	7
Reichsbahn/Eintracht Hannover	9	9
SC Göttingen 05	10	
VfB Braunschweig		2
SpVgg Hannover 1897		6
