= List of Eintracht Braunschweig players =

Eintracht Braunschweig is a German professional football club based in Braunschweig, Lower Saxony. The club was founded in 1895.

== List of players ==
- Appearances and goals are for first-team competitive matches only. Included are all games in domestic leagues (including championship and promotion/relegation play-offs) and the German Cup (DFB-Pokal) from the 1947–48 season up to the most recent completed season, the European Cup, and the UEFA Cup. Domestic league and cup games before 1947 are not included due to incomplete records, although players who have only made confirmed appearances before 1947 are still listed if they have their own Wikipedia article.

Player spent entire professional career (at least eight seasons) with Eintracht Braunschweig.
International player

Player	Nationality	Position	Eintracht career	Games (1947–)	Goals (1947–)
Suleiman Abdullahi	Nigeria	Forward	2016–	14	1
Orhan Ademi	Switzerland	Forward	2012–2014; 2015–2016	85	8
Holger Aden	Germany	Forward	1989–1992	104	56
Benjamin Adrion	Germany	Midfielder	2003–2004	17	2
Hermann Ahlbrecht	Germany	Defender	1949–1950	1	0
Heinz Albrecht	Germany	Goalkeeper	1947–1948	3	0
Karsten Alrutz	Germany	Midfielder	1990–1992	21	0
Martin Amedick	Germany	Defender	2004–2006	67	2
Patrick Amrhein	Germany	Midfielder	2010–2011	11	1
Jupp Arens	Germany	Forward	1950–1952	54	18
Marc Arnold	Germany	Midfielder	2003–2004	27	4
Abayomi Arobieke	Nigeria	Forward	1997–1999	32	12
Valentine Atem	Cameroon	Forward	2007	13	3
Harald Aumeier	Germany	Midfielder	1977–1979	14	0
Günther Axnick	Germany	Goalkeeper	1950–1953	46	0
Selim Aydemir	Turkey	Forward	2008–2009	4	0
Sebastian Backer	Germany	Defender	2003–2005	10	0
Joachim Bäse	Germany	Defender	1959–1973	347	33
Joseph Baffo	Sweden	Defender	2015–	45	1
Mohammad Baghdadi	Germany	Defender	2014–2016	2	0
Mushaga Bakenga	Norway	Forward	2014–2015	18	2
Francis Banecki	Germany	Defender	2006–2007	10	0
Fait-Florian Banser	Germany	Forward	2008–2010	55	7
Heinz Bartels	Germany	Midfielder	1973–1974	19	2
Marc-Oliver Barton	Germany	Defender	2002–2003	2	0
Igor Barukčić	Croatia	Midfielder	2007	4	0
Robin Becker	Germany	Defender	2017–	0	0
Ihor Belanov	Ukraine/Soviet Union	Forward	1990–1994	69	22
Karim Bellarabi	Germany	Forward	2008–2011; 2013–2014	65	11
Thoralf Bennert	Germany	Midfielder	1997–1999	43	8
Horst Berg	Germany	Midfielder	1967–1969	62	8
Emil Berggreen	Denmark	Forward	2015	28	11
Magnús Bergs	Iceland	Midfielder	1984–1985	7	0
Sven Berkenhagen	Germany	Forward	1993–1995	28	2
Julius Biada	Germany	Midfielder	2016–	22	3
Ermin Bičakčić	Bosnia and Herzegovina	Defender	2012–2014	82	5
Hakan Biçici	Turkey	Midfielder	1996–1997	27	8
Patrick Bick	Germany	Midfielder	2003–2007	89	15
Herbert Bittner	Germany	Forward	1981–1982	4	0
Horst Bloch	Germany	Forward	1947–1953	60	15
Klaus Blumenberg	Germany	Forward	1961–1963	42	9
Otto Bode	Germany	Midfielder	1958–1961	67	0
Steffen Bohl	Germany	Midfielder	2011–2013	35	1
Heinz Bohnes	Germany	Forward	1960–1961	21	3
Mirko Boland	Germany	Midfielder	2009–	287	27
Hasse Borg	Sweden	Defender	1977–1983	198	10
Sven Boy	Germany	Defender	1995–1998	92	16
Helmut Bräutigam	Germany	Goalkeeper	1950–1951	2	0
Serge Branco	Cameroon	Defender	1998–2000	48	1
Wolfgang Brase	Germany	Defender	1958–1967	184	4
Steve Breitkreuz	Germany	Defender	2017–	0	0
Paul Breitner	Germany	Midfielder	1977–1978	39	15
Dennis Brinkmann	Germany	Defender	2005–2010	134	3
Fabian Bröcker	Germany	Defender	2007–2008	4	0
Horst Broschat	Germany	Defender	1947–1949	44	13
Holger Brügmann	Germany	Forward	1984–1985	6	0
Ludwig Bründl	Germany	Forward	1971–1975	148	67
Matthias Bruns	Germany	Defender	1977–1986	224	21
Erwin Bruske	Germany	Forward	1955–1958	55	18
Bernd Buchheister	Germany	Forward	1985–1993	269	78
Eduard Buckmaier	Germany	Midfielder	1986–1988	65	7
Konrad Bülte	Germany	Midfielder	1903–1911	N/A	N/A
Herbert Burdenski	Germany	Midfielder	1944–1945; 1946	N/A	N/A
Mirko Burgdorf	Germany	Defender	1998–2004	33	3
Gerhard Buß	Germany	Forward	1948–1949	1	0
Günter Busse	Germany	Defender	1961–1963	26	4
Michael Butrej	Germany	Midfielder	1992–1993	38	5
Marco Calamita	Italy	Forward	2009–2011	53	11
Marco Caligiuri	Germany	Midfielder	2013–2014	13	0
Alessandro Caruso	Germany	Defender	2005–2006	11	0
Nermin Čeliković	Bosnia and Herzegovina	Midfielder	2004–2006	44	5
Sambo Choji	Nigeria	Forward	2002–2003	24	8
Tommy Christensen	Denmark	Forward	1988–1989	23	4
Daniyel Cimen	Germany	Midfielder	2007	13	0
Giovanni Cirocca	Italy	Forward	1992–1993	10	0
Lars Conrad	Germany	Forward	1996–1998	10	2
Marcel Correia	Portugal	Defender	2011–2017	120	1
Eros Dacaj	Germany	Midfielder	2017–	0	0
Tim Danneberg	Germany	Midfielder	2007–2010	98	9
Daniel Davari	Iran	Goalkeeper	2009–2014	92	0
Saulo Decarli	Switzerland	Defender	2014–2017	80	3
René Deffke	Germany	Forward	1998–2000	29	12
Marco Dehne	Germany	Midfielder	1996–1999	80	15
Erhan Demirci	Turkey		1998–1999	1	0
Jaro Deppe	Germany	Forward	1967–1974	83	28
Fahed Dermech	Tunisia	Defender	1999–2000	27	5
Josef Deutsch	Germany	Defender	1956–1957	15	0
Herbert Dietzel	Germany	Goalkeeper	1948–1949	3	0
Bernd Dörfel	Germany	Forward	1968–1970	53	4
Deniz Doğan	Turkey	Defender	2007–2015	213	12
Wolfgang Dremmler	Germany	Midfielder	1973–1979	200	17
Werner Dreßel	Germany	Forward	1987–1990	43	12
Jürgen Dudda	Germany	Midfielder	1971–1974	36	2
Julius Düker	Germany	Forward	2014–2016	18	0
Hans-Georg Dulz	Germany	Midfielder	1963–1968	120	18
Horst Dumke	Germany	Defender	1949–1950	5	0
Janosch Dziwior	Germany	Defender	2002–2003	30	1
Justus Eccarius	Germany	Midfielder	1955–1959	81	15
Frank Edmond	Germany	Defender	1999–2001	58	9
Randy Edwini-Bonsu	Canada	Forward	2012–2013	17	0
Frank Eggeling	Germany	Forward	1982–1983	6	0
Heinz-Werner Eggeling	Germany	Forward	1979–1980	17	4
Lutz Eigendorf	Germany/East Germany	Midfielder	1982–1983	9	2
Bernd Eigner	Germany	Defender	1999–2003	76	8
Justin Eilers	Germany	Forward	2008–2009	9	0
Omar Elabdellaoui	Norway	Midfielder	2013–2014	44	1
Gerhard Elfert	Germany	Midfielder	1967–1971	60	4
Lars Ellmerich	Germany	Midfielder	1979–1987	143	36
Heinrich Ender	Germany	Forward	1937–1948	16	6
Manuel Endres	Germany	Forward	2000–2002	22	5
Michael Endrikat	Germany	Midfielder	1988–1989	1	0
Dietmar Erler	Germany	Midfielder	1970–1981	299	61
Jonas Erwig-Drüppel	Germany	Forward	2012–2014	6	0
Everson	Brazil	Midfielder	1999–2000	14	6
Gustav Fähland	Germany	Goalkeeper	1947–1949	6	0
Patrick Falk	Germany	Midfielder	2000–2001	19	5
Franz Farke	Germany	Forward	1953–1955	25	9
Jasmin Fejzić	Bosnia and Herzegovina	Goalkeeper	2007–2009; 2015–	80	0
Mathias Fetsch	Germany	Forward	2010–2012	46	6
Ronald Feuerhahn	Germany	Defender	1974–1975	1	0
Helmut Fiegen	Germany	Forward	1951–1952	12	2
Lutz Fischer	Germany	Midfielder	1983–1987	16	0
Sergei Fokin	Russia/Soviet Union	Defender	1992–2000	170	2
Jacek Frąckiewicz	Poland	Forward	1989–1991	16	1
Wolfgang Frank	Germany	Forward	1974–1977	122	67
Bernd Franke	Germany	Goalkeeper	1971–1985	482	0
Willi Fricke	Germany	Defender	1938–1952	108	1
Horst Frühaber	Germany	Defender	1948–1949	17	1
Benjamin Fuchs	Austria	Defender	2007–2012	100	4
Lars Fuchs	Germany	Forward	2002–2008	123	22
Michael Geiger	Germany	Defender	1979–1986	218	24
Ralf Geilenkirchen	Germany	Midfielder	1990–1993	75	6
Jürgen Geisen	Germany	Forward	1960–1961	13	1
Aleksandre Geladze	Georgia	Midfielder	1994–1995	16	4
Enrico Gerlach	Germany	Midfielder	1995–1998	28	3
Bernd Gersdorff	Germany	Forward	1969–1973; 1973–1976	258	101
Klaus Gerwien	Germany	Forward	1961–1974	321	49
Peter Geyer	Germany	Forward	1981–1984	65	10
Rafał Gikiewicz	Poland	Goalkeeper	2014–2016	72	0
Matthias Gluch	Germany	Forward	1996–1997	2	1
Heinz Goffard	Germany	Midfielder	1957–1958	4	0
Alexandru Golban	Moldova	Forward	2007	6	0
Guido Gorges	Germany	Defender	2002–2003	13	0
Horst Gorges	Germany	Forward	1956–1961	102	10
Stefan Gorges	Germany	Midfielder	1985–1986	3	0
Bernd Gorski	Germany	Defender	1984–1991	241	15
Daniel Graf	Germany	Forward	2003–2007	90	27
Ingo Greitemeier	Germany	Forward	1986–1987	12	0
Marco Grimm	Germany	Defender	2003–2007	126	3
Milton Griffiths	Jamaica	Midfielder	2000–2001	14	3
Wolfgang Grobe	Germany	Midfielder	1976–1982	185	36
Matthias Grupe	Germany	Midfielder	1997–1999	43	1
Claus Grzeskowiak	Germany	Defender	1999–2001	37	0
Wolfgang Grzyb	Germany	Defender	1965–1978	397	30
Karl-Heinz Güldner	Germany	Forward	1951–1952	6	0
Heinz Güttgemanns	Germany	Defender	1953–1959	150	13
Sebastian Gundelach	Germany	Defender	2007–2008	19	0
Friedhelm Haebermann	Germany	Defender	1969–1978	313	13
Hans Hagenacker	Germany	Forward	1946–1949	45	15
Mathias Hain	Germany	Goalkeeper	1991–1999	180	1
Uwe Hain	Germany	Goalkeeper	1973–1982; 1987–1991	212	0
Heinz Hamacher	Germany	Forward	1951–1952	2	0
Karl-Heinz Handschuh	Germany	Midfielder	1974–1980	196	27
Otto Harder	Germany	Forward	1909–1913	N/A	N/A
Stefan Hauk	Germany	Forward	2007–2008	10	0
Eberhard Haun	Germany	Midfielder	1970–1974	114	4
Martin Hauswald	Germany	Midfielder	2005–2007	27	0
Dieter Hecking	Germany	Midfielder	1999–2000	18	5
Vegar Eggen Hedenstad	Norway	Defender	2014–2015	30	1
Volkhart Heide	Germany	Defender	1947–1948	1	0
Hans-Jürgen Hellfritz	Germany	Defender	1972–1976	90	2
Karl-Heinz Hellwig	Germany	Defender	1954–1959	98	19
Matthias Henn	Germany	Defender	2007–2015	113	6
Matthias Henze	Germany	Defender	1999–2001	10	1
Heinz-Adolf Heper	Germany		1952–1953	1	0
Michael Herberg	Germany	Midfielder	1991–1992	2	0
Thomas Herbst	Germany	Forward	1982–1983	19	4
Onel Hernández	Germany	Forward	2016–	36	5
Winfried Herz	Germany	Forward	1951–1961	172	68
Ralf Heskamp	Germany	Midfielder	1992–1993	25	2
Dustin Heun	Germany	Forward	2005–2006	23	0
Volker Heuschkel	Germany	Midfielder	1979–1981	4	0
Reinhold Hintermaier	Austria	Midfielder	1984–1986	64	3
Klaus Hinz	Germany	Forward	1962–1963	11	0
Bernhardt Hirschberg	Germany	Forward	1951–1953	55	20
Jan Hochscheidt	Germany	Midfielder	2013–	85	9
Sascha Hörster	Germany	Midfielder	2001–2003	47	0
Dieter Hoff	Germany	Forward	1985–1987	4	0
Arne Hoffart	Germany	Midfielder	1992–1994	49	3
Hans Hoffmann	Germany	Midfielder	1958–1961	25	3
Herbert Hofmann	Germany	Defender	1953–1958	131	1
Wolfgang Hoinza	Germany	Goalkeeper	1973–1975	2	0
Dirk Holdorf	Germany	Midfielder	1988–1990	36	4
Reiner Hollmann	Germany	Defender	1973–1984	342	37
Finn Holsing	Germany	Midfielder	2005–2007	30	2
Gerrit Holtmann	Germany	Midfielder	2015–2016	33	6
Stefan Holze	Germany	Midfielder	1989–1992	80	25
Frank Holzer	Germany	Midfielder	1976–1980	46	3
Martin Horáček	Czech Republic	Defender	2007–2008	34	1
Adrian Horn	Germany	Goalkeeper	2007–2010	33	0
Jörg Hoßbach	Germany	Goalkeeper	1984–1988	66	0
Helmut Hosung	Germany	Midfielder	1961–1965	76	18
Alexander Huber	Tajikistan	Defender	2007	17	0
Werner Hums	Germany	Goalkeeper	1953–1956	7	0
Haris Hyseni	Germany	Forward	2015	1	0
Markus Husterer	Germany	Defender	2006–2007	28	0
Karsten Hutwelker	Germany	Midfielder	2003	15	2
Mads Dittmer Hvilsom	Denmark	Forward	2015	7	0
Vakhtang Iagorashvili	Georgia	Forward	1994–1995	8	0
Rudi Istenič	Slovenia	Midfielder	2001–2003	17	0
Hans Jäcker	Germany	Goalkeeper	1956–1967	270	0
Simeon Jackson	Canada	Forward	2013	10	0
Tobias Jaensch	Germany	Defender	1994–1996	13	0
Davit Janelidze	Georgia	Goalkeeper	1994–1995	1	0
Maciej Janiak	Poland	Forward	1994–1995	24	7
Michał Janicki	Poland	Forward	2005–2006	5	0
Dominik Jansen	Germany	Forward	2003–2005	42	3
Bent Jensen	Denmark	Forward	1972–1973	22	2
Walter Jeschke	Germany	Goalkeeper	1951–1952	14	0
Waldemar Josef	Germany	Goalkeeper	1982–1986	43	0
Torsten Jülich	Germany	Defender	2003–2007	94	1
Daniel Jurgeleit	Germany	Forward	1997–1999	40	15
Peter Kaack	Germany	Defender	1963–1973	331	3
Maik Kappel	Germany	Defender	1992–1998	99	6
Seyyid Karadag	Turkey	Forward	1998–1999	1	0
Holger Karp	Germany	Midfielder	2002–2004	26	0
Rolf Kassel	Germany	Defender	1954–1960	49	0
Bekim Kastrati	Albania	Forward	2006–2007	7	1
Yahiro Kazama	Japan	Midfielder	1988–1989	16	0
Karl-Heinz Keil	Germany	Defender	1947–1949	33	0
Clemens Kerfers	Germany	Forward	1949–1950	17	6
Benjamin Kessel	Germany	Defender	2010–2015	106	8
Günter Keute	Germany	Forward	1980–1984	115	22
Salim Khelifi	Switzerland	Midfielder	2014–	67	9
Burkhard Kick	Germany	Goalkeeper	1994–1995	4	0
Uwe Kienert	Germany	Forward	1994–1997	58	15
Niko Kijewski	Germany	Midfielder	2015–	14	0
Harald Killer	Germany	Midfielder	1954–1961	18	0
Reinhard Kindermann	Germany	Midfielder	1980–1986	175	13
Manfred Kipp	Germany	Forward	1971–1972	6	0
Sascha Kirschstein	Germany	Goalkeeper	1999–2002	4	0
Jörg Klein	Germany	Defender	1980–1981	1	0
Björn Kluft	Germany	Midfielder	2012–2013; 2014	1	0
Marc Knackstedt	Germany	Defender	1993–1994	1	0
Willi Knäblein	Germany	Goalkeeper	1947–1948	1	0
Dietmar Koch	Germany	Midfielder	1988–1989	2	0
Özkan Koçtürk	Turkey	Forward	1992–1996; 1997	78	24
Samuel Koejoe	Netherlands	Forward	2006	9	0
Michael Köpper	Germany	Defender	1991–1993	70	1
Michael Köritzer	Germany	Midfielder	1991–1993	17	0
Thorsten Kohn	Germany	Midfielder	1994–2000	166	5
Kai Koitka	Germany	Forward	2007–2008	13	0
Miloš Kolaković	Serbia and Montenegro	Forward	1995–1998; 1999–2001	136	50
Hartmut Konschal	Germany	Forward	1971–1976	122	17
Gianluca Korte	Germany	Forward	2011–2014; 2015	19	2
Raffael Korte	Germany	Midfielder	2011–2013; 2014–2015	41	2
Dieter Krafczyk	Germany	Forward	1964–1966	46	13
Oliver Kragl	Germany	Midfielder	2009–2011	17	2
Kevin Kratz	Germany	Midfielder	2012–2014	34	3
Siegfried Krause	Germany	Forward	1957–1959	6	1
Uwe Krause	Germany	Forward	1977–1980	49	11
Wolf-Rüdiger Krause	Germany	Forward	1965–1967	5	1
Sven Kretschmer	Germany	Forward	1992–1993	32	5
Willi Kronhardt	Germany	Defender	1993–1996	77	10
Dennis Kruppke	Germany	Forward	2008–2015	204	61
Andreas Kubsda	Germany	Midfielder	1983–1989	83	6
Afrim Kuci	Albania	Defender	2000–2001	11	1
Markus Küpper	Germany	Defender	1999–2004	123	1
Gerd Kuhlmeyer	Germany	Defender	1973–1975	2	0
Domi Kumbela	Democratic Republic of the Congo	Forward	2008; 2010–2014; 2016–	210	78
Alexander Kunze	Germany	Goalkeeper	2002–2007	32	0
Ahmet Kuru	Turkey	Forward	2004–2006	86	33
Manfred Kusch	Germany	Defender	2000–2001	1	0
Ludwig Lachner	Germany	Forward	1934–1949	21	1
Jürgen Lange	Germany	Midfielder	1995–1997	29	1
Kurt Laue	Germany	Goalkeeper	1948–1950	31	0
Nico Lauenstein	Germany	Goalkeeper	2004–2009	2	0
Peter Laupenmühlen	Germany	Defender	1951–1952	26	7
Philipp Laux	Germany	Goalkeeper	2002–2003	9	0
Dirk Lellek	Germany	Defender	1988–1990	63	5
Dennis Lemke	Germany	Forward	2010–2011	1	0
Christian Lenze	Germany	Midfielder	2007–2009	51	5
Leozinho	Brazil	Midfielder	2007	13	2
Oliver Lerch	Germany	Goalkeeper	1988–1994	93	0
Karl Ley	Germany	Midfielder	1951–1953	15	1
Torsten Lieberknecht	Germany	Midfielder	2003–2007	85	2
Karl-Heinz Liese	Germany	Midfielder	1946–1949	35	1
Jameleddine Limam	Tunisia	Forward	1990–1991	19	0
Detlef Lindner	Germany	Midfielder	1984–1987	7	0
Heinz Lippert	Germany	Defender	1947–1950	12	0
Tino Loechelt	Germany	Midfielder	1986–1993	196	20
Max Lorenz	Germany	Midfielder	1969–1972	77	3
Jürgen Losekam	Germany	Defender	1999–2000	8	0
Ronald Lotz	Germany	Defender	1989–1991	23	1
Peter Lübeke	Germany	Midfielder	1977–1980	31	3
Rouven Lütke	Germany	Midfielder	1995–1996	11	1
Christian Lutz	Germany	Midfielder	2001–2003	9	0
Peter Lux	Germany	Midfielder	1981–1985; 1990–1993	141	19
Erich Maas	Germany	Forward	1964–1970	194	44
Heinz-Günter Maas	Germany	Forward	1987–1988	5	0
Niels Mackel	Germany	Midfielder	1997–2000	35	4
Mohamed Ali Mahjoubi	Tunisia	Midfielder	1991–1993	66	9
Hans Mahlberg	Germany	Defender	1950–1956	21	0
Alexander Malchow	Germany	Defender	1993–1994	36	11
Kais Manai	Tunisia	Midfielder	2000–2001	13	3
Leo Marić	Bosnia and Herzegovina	Forward	1996–1998	62	21
Horst Marx	Germany	Forward	1955–1957	8	2
Herbert Matschinsky	Germany	Forward	1949–1950	8	2
Adam Matuszczyk	Poland	Midfielder	2015–2017	33	1
Wolfgang Matz	Germany	Defender	1965–1967	17	0
Michél Mazingu-Dinzey	Democratic Republic of the Congo	Midfielder	2002–2004	66	18
Kelmend Mehmeti	Germany	Midfielder	1998–2001	5	0
Heinz Meier	Germany	Midfielder	1951–1952	22	1
Frank Meissner	Germany	Defender	1998–2000	51	4
Stefan Meissner	Germany	Forward	1990–1994	48	15
Helmut Mende	Germany	Goalkeeper	1947–1949	26	0
Pierre Merkel	Germany	Forward	2011–2013	26	4
Franz Merkhoffer	Germany	Defender	1968–1984	563	30
Ulf Metschies	Germany	Defender	1991–1993	68	0
Burghardt Mettke	Germany	Goalkeeper	1948–1949	4	0
Ernst-Otto Meyer	Germany	Forward	1957–1958	33	24
Friedrich Meyer	Germany	Defender	1950–1951	8	0
Klaus Meyer	Germany	Defender	1958–1968	212	3
Allan Michaelsen	Denmark	Midfielder	1972–1974	58	5
Vladan Milovanović	Serbia and Montenegro	Forward	1998–1999	27	11
Thomas Möller	Germany	Defender	1992–1993	21	0
Jürgen Moll	Germany	Forward	1957–1968	296	105
Quirin Moll	Germany	Midfielder	2016–	31	0
Smail Morabit	France	Forward	2008–2010	47	2
Roman Müller	Germany	Defender	1998–1999	9	1
Rudolf Müller	Germany	Defender	1947–1954	137	1
Ernst Naab	Germany	Defender	1938–1951	102	7
Tibor Nadj	Germany	Midfielder	2001–2003	44	4
Samir Naja	Germany	Midfielder	1998–2001	6	0
Valentin Năstase	Romania	Defender	2008–2009	25	7
Guido Naumann	Germany	Forward	1988–1991	46	7
Miloš Nedić	Bosnia and Herzegovina	Defender	1992–1994	57	6
Christian Neidhart	Germany	Midfielder	1986–1988	3	0
Uwe Nester	Germany	Forward	1979–1981	17	0
Erich Neupert	Germany	Midfielder	1953–1957	40	3
Adama Niang	Senegal	Defender	2001–2003	17	0
Harald Nickel	Germany	Forward	1978–1979	29	18
Håvard Nielsen	Norway	Forward	2014–2015	48	12
Steffen Nkansah	Germany	Defender	2017–	0	0
Christoffer Nyman	Sweden	Forward	2016–	33	11
Werner Oberländer	Germany	Forward	1951–1956	84	47
Torsten Oehrl	Germany	Forward	2007–2008; 2013–2015	46	10
Phil Ofosu-Ayeh	Ghana	Defender	2015–2017	40	1
Burkhardt Öller	Germany	Goalkeeper	1967–1971	24	0
Nik Omladič	Slovenia	Midfielder	2015–2017	72	4
Klaus Ondera	Germany	Forward	1973–1974	3	0
Riley O'Neill	Canada	Forward	2008–2009	2	0
Kingsley Onuegbu	Nigeria	Forward	2008–2010	59	17
Markus Osthoff	Germany	Midfielder	2002–2003	7	0
Otacilio Jales	Brazil	Midfielder	2006–2007	16	1
Tobias Oteng-Mensah	Germany	Midfielder	1999–2000	7	0
Walter Otto	Germany	Midfielder	1952–1954	29	4
Hans-Heinrich Pahl	Germany	Defender	1980–1987	232	25
Heinz Palvner	Germany	Midfielder	1952–1953	3	0
Frank Partzsch	Germany	Midfielder	1983–1988	2	0
Viktor Pasulko	Ukraine/Soviet Union	Midfielder	1993–1996	101	17
Denni Patschinsky	Germany	Forward	2004–2005	33	2
Heinz Patzig	Germany	Forward	1954–1962	191	43
Dieter Paulsberg	Germany	Forward	1963–1964	1	0
Stanislaw Pawlak	Germany	Midfielder	1953–1954	10	0
Ralf Pendorf	Germany	Forward	1948–1951	63	8
Heinz Pennewitz	Germany	Midfielder	1949–1950	14	0
Timo Perthel	Germany	Midfielder	2013–2014	12	1
Klaus Peter	Germany	Midfielder	1957–1962	68	7
Philipp Peters	Germany	Midfielder	2008	5	0
Oliver Petersch	Germany	Midfielder	2011–2013	25	1
Marjan Petković	Germany	Goalkeeper	2009–2015	94	0
Thomas Pfannkuch	Germany	Defender	1992–1999	220	19
Marc Pfitzner	Germany	Midfielder	2007–2016	203	12
Stephan Pientak	Germany	Midfielder	2003–2005	12	0
Thomas Piorunek	Germany	Midfielder	2000–2003	53	3
Werner Pisarski	Germany	Defender	1953–1956	47	2
Frank Plagge	Germany	Forward	1984–1986	65	17
Rrustem Podvorica	Albania	Midfielder	1998–2000	25	0
Michael Polywka	Germany	Midfielder	1967–1971	96	9
Danilo Popivoda	Yugoslavia	Forward	1975–1981	151	34
Walter Poppe	Germany	Midfielder	1904–1912	N/A	N/A
Peer Posipal	Germany	Midfielder	1982–1989	158	18
Andreas Pospich	Germany	Defender	1984–1991	213	23
Ulf-Volker Probst	Germany	Midfielder	1989–1994	161	25
Paul Protzek	Germany	Forward	1949–1950	1	0
Werner Puppel	Germany	Forward	1955–1956	28	1
Richard Queck	Germany	Forward	1907–1914	N/A	N/A
Goran Radojević	Serbia and Montenegro	Forward	1993–1994	25	7
Zoran Ratković	Croatia	Forward	2007	3	0
Tobias Rau	Germany	Defender	1999–2001	60	1
Ken Reichel	Germany	Defender	2007–	282	20
Uwe Reinders	Germany	Forward	1987–1988	24	9
Julius Reinhardt	Germany	Midfielder	2010–2012	33	2
Horst Rick	United States	Defender	1960–1961	23	0
Thomas Ridder	Germany	Defender	2001–2003	33	0
Hans Riederich	Germany	Midfielder	1949–1954	116	7
Werner Rinas	Germany	Midfielder	1965–1966	14	0
Vasil Ringov	Yugoslavia	Midfielder	1985–1986	4	0
Jürgen Rische	Germany	Forward	2002–2007	169	32
Aleksandar Ristić	Yugoslavia	Midfielder	1974–1978	92	4
Sreto Ristić	Germany	Forward	2007–2008	18	1
Marcus Rode	Germany	Defender	1993–1994	2	0
Kosta Rodrigues	Germany	Midfielder	1999–2002; 2004–2009	237	11
Rolf Rohrberg	Germany	Forward	1945–1949	44	11
Olaf Rose	Germany	Forward	1988–1991	72	9
Paul Roth	Germany	Forward	1949–1950	2	0
Johannes Ruhnke	Germany	Defender	1950–1955	110	1
Werner Ruppel	Germany	Forward	1953–1955	55	6
Joachim Ruth	Germany	Forward	1951–1955	16	4
Ryu Seung-woo	South Korea	Forward	2014–2015	18	4
Ernst Saalfrank	Germany	Defender	1961–1965	26	0
Gerd Saborowski	Germany	Forward	1966–1971	84	14
Christian Sackewitz	Germany	Forward	1984–1985	13	0
Hans-Jürgen Salewski	Germany	Midfielder	1979–1980	2	0
Jasmin Samardžić	Croatia	Forward	1997–1999	28	0
Louis Samson	Germany	Midfielder	2017–	0	0
Maximilian Sauer	Germany	Forward	2014–	40	1
Ivan Savić	Yugoslavia	Forward	1987–1988	25	6
Jan Schanda	Germany	Defender	2001–2003; 2008–2010	108	3
Michael Scheike	Germany	Defender	1983–1991	164	8
Dominik Scheil	Germany	Defender	2008–2009	1	0
Heinz-Günter Scheil	Germany	Defender	1984–1993	239	6
Siegfried Schellenberger	Germany	Forward	1952–1953	16	6
André Schembri	Malta	Forward	2007–2008	29	9
Walter Schemel	Germany	Forward	1942–1946; 1947–1950	72	44
Marcel Schied	Germany	Forward	2008–2009	31	6
Sven Schierding	Germany	Midfielder	2000–2001	1	0
Alexander Schiller	Germany	Midfielder	2000–2001	10	1
Nils Schmäler	Germany	Defender	1987–1988	27	4
Olaf Schmäler	Germany	Defender	1987–1988	34	13
Thomas Schmidt	Germany	Defender	1988–1991	108	9
Walter Schmidt	Germany	Defender	1959–1969	317	14
Marc Schmitz	Germany	Forward	1995–1997	50	6
Frank Schön	Germany	Midfielder	1979–1980; 1983–1986	7	0
Patrick Schönfeld	Germany	Midfielder	2015–	38	0
Darius Scholtysik	Germany	Midfielder	2000–2001	4	0
Gerhardt Scholz	Germany	Forward	1959–1961	19	5
Sven Scholze	Germany	Midfielder	1991–1996	47	0
Gerhard Schrader	Germany	Forward	1961–1964	47	13
Lothar Schröder	Germany	Forward	1950–1952	22	8
Sven Schuchardt	Germany	Forward	2001–2003	33	3
Michael Schulze	Germany	Defender	2017–	1	0
Dirk Schuster	Germany/East Germany	Defender	1990–1991	38	4
Tobias Schweinsteiger	Germany	Forward	2006–2007	20	3
Michael Schweska	Germany	Defender	1992–1993	10	1
Roman Sedláček	Czech Republic/Czechoslovakia	Forward	1993–1994	7	1
Thomas Seeliger	Germany	Midfielder	1989–1991	75	15
Werner Seitz	Germany	Forward	1950–1952	38	5
Heinz Senftleben	Germany	Goalkeeper	1952–1956	96	0
Victor Siasia	Nigeria	Forward	1999–2001	21	3
Olaf Siebart	Germany	Forward	1986–1987	9	1
Benjamin Siegert	Germany	Midfielder	2004–2007	102	3
Alessandro da Silva	Brazil	Midfielder	2000–2003	89	0
Daniel Simon	Germany	Forward	1993–1996	18	4
Wolfgang Simon	Germany	Midfielder	1965–1968	6	0
Sven Simonsen	Germany	Forward	1998–2000	25	6
Rainer Skrotzki	Germany	Forward	1970–1972	39	2
Rainer Slodczyk	Germany	Defender	1971–1975	2	0
Jan Spoelder	Netherlands	Goalkeeper	1995–2005	18	0
Otto Spohrs	Germany	Forward	1952–1955	23	5
Markus Stanko	Germany	Forward	1995–1996	18	2
Sándor Steidl	Hungary	Midfielder	1989–1990	14	1
Norbert Stolzenburg	Germany	Forward	1976–1977	14	5
Ralf Strogies	Germany	Defender	1991–1992	32	3
Thorsten Stuckmann	Germany	Goalkeeper	2003–2007	133	0
Jarosław Studzizba	Poland	Midfielder	1981–1984	53	10
Torsten Sümnich	Germany	Midfielder	2001–2006	76	5
Otto Sürth	Germany	Forward	1951–1952	17	6
Albert Sukop	Germany	Midfielder	1930–1948	6	0
Jan Tauer	Germany	Defender	2004–2007	62	0
Daniel Teixeira	Brazil	Forward	2001–2003	49	23
Werner Thamm	Germany	Forward	1950–1962	295	116
Norman Theuerkauf	Germany	Midfielder	2009–2015	175	8
Abdoul Thiam	Germany	Defender	2001–2003	63	2
Jacob Thomas	United States	Forward	1999–2004	123	22
Thomas Thumerer	Germany	Midfielder	1989–1990	8	0
Phillip Tietz	Germany	Forward	2016–	11	1
Matthias Tietze	Germany	Midfielder	1995–1999	37	3
Maik Tischler	Germany	Forward	1990–1991	1	0
Holger Trimhold	Germany	Midfielder	1979–1981	53	3
Manfred Tripbacher	Germany	Midfielder	1978–1986	249	29
Frank Türr	Germany	Forward	1992–1993	20	1
Emre Turan	Turkey	Defender	2010–2013	4	0
Zdravko Tuzlak	Croatia	Forward	2000–2001	2	0
Piotr Tyszkiewicz	Poland	Forward	1998–2000	25	10
Aykut Ünyazici	Turkey	Midfielder	1958–1965	81	5
Markus Unger	Germany	Midfielder	2010–2012	16	1
Lothar Ulsaß	Germany	Forward	1964–1971	215	90
Gustav Valsvik	Norway	Defender	2016–	32	0
Ingo Vandreike	Germany	Midfielder	1993–1999	122	13
Eckhard Vofrei	Germany	Goalkeeper	1975–1976	1	0
Damir Vrančić	Bosnia and Herzegovina	Midfielder	2009–2016	134	11
Marc Vucinovic	Germany	Midfielder	2009–2010	4	0
Silviu Vuia	Romania	Midfielder	1993–1994	14	0
Otto Wahrendorf	Germany	Forward	1947–1955	89	32
Jan Washausen	Germany	Defender	2007–2012; 2013–2015	72	1
Jürgen Weber	Germany	Midfielder	1973–1975	32	2
Dirk Weetendorf	Germany	Forward	1999–2002	60	37
Andre Wegner	Germany	Defender	1996–1997	5	0
René Wegner	Germany	Defender	2003–2007	17	0
Holger Wehlage	Germany	Midfielder	2007–2009	23	2
Dennis Weiland	Germany	Midfielder	2006–2007	11	1
Roland Weisheit	Germany	Midfielder	1993–1997	110	2
Hartmut Weiß	Germany	Forward	1968–1970	61	20
Werner Weiß	Germany	Midfielder	1959–1961	41	10
Horst Wenker	Germany	Forward	1955–1958	69	6
Joachim Werner	Germany	Midfielder	1958–1963	38	4
Lothar Weschke	Germany	Forward	1963–1966	17	0
Dieter Wetterling	Germany	Defender	1958–1959	4	0
Herbert Widmayer	Germany	Forward	1933–1938	N/A	N/A
Wieche	Germany	Midfielder	1973–1974	1	0
Andreas Wieczorek	Germany	Midfielder	2000–2001	25	4
Clemens Wieczorek	Germany	Defender	1947–1948	2	0
Peter Wiehle	Germany	Defender	1992–1993	10	0
Hans Wilhelm	Germany	Midfielder	1947–1948	5	1
Ernst Wilhelmy	Germany	Forward	1949–1950	9	1
Rainer Wilk	Germany	Goalkeeper	1986–1987	4	0
Michael Wilke	Germany	Midfielder	1986–1990	127	3
Andreas Winkler	Germany	Midfielder	1997–2000	40	8
Ludwig Winkler	Germany	Forward	1958–1959	9	5
Heinz Winneke	Germany	Goalkeeper	1954–1961	21	0
Dirk de Wit	Germany	Midfielder	2001–2002	27	11
Gustav Wöhler	Germany	Forward	1949–1951	53	11
Wolfgang Wolfram	Germany	Defender	1960–1965	48	0
Herbert Wolter	Germany	Forward	1951–1952	1	0
Horst Wolter	Germany	Goalkeeper	1961–1972	217	0
Ronnie Worm	Germany	Forward	1979–1987	262	105
Heinz Wozniakowski	Germany	Forward	1951–1958	135	72
Otto Wulfert	Germany	Forward	1948–1949	1	2
Rashin Wurie	Sierra Leone	Forward	2000–2001	2	0
Manfred Wuttich	Germany	Forward	1961–1965	55	29
Josephus Yenay	Liberia	Forward	2000–2001	17	1
Özkan Yıldırım	Germany	Midfielder	2017–	0	0
Ramazan Yıldırım	Turkey	Midfielder	2007–2009	36	0
Fatih Yılmaz	Turkey	Midfielder	2008–2010	3	0
Armando Zani	Albania	Midfielder	1997–1999	43	8
Ilija Zavišić	Yugoslavia	Midfielder	1980–1984	99	20
Dieter Zembski	Germany	Defender	1975–1980	143	0
Peter Zerr	Germany	Defender	1983–1984	1	0
Zhang Chengdong	China	Forward	2012–2013	12	0
Igor Žiković	Croatia	Forward	2007	6	0
Rainer Ziemke	Germany	Forward	1950–1951	3	0
Horst Zimmermann	Germany	Defender	1952–1955	20	2
Jan Zimmermann	Germany	Midfielder	2003–2004	24	0
Nico Zimmermann	Germany	Midfielder	2011–2012	23	2
Uwe Zimmermann	Germany	Goalkeeper	1999–2002	102	0
Hendrick Zuck	Germany	Midfielder	2014–	79	4

== List of international players ==
This is a list of past and present football players who were capped by their country whilst playing for Eintracht Braunschweig.

- Caps: Number of games for the senior national team whilst playing for Eintracht Braunschweig.
- Goals: Number of goals for the senior national team whilst playing for Eintracht Braunschweig.
- OLY C: Number of games for the national Olympic team whilst playing for Eintracht Braunschweig (final tournament only).
- OLY G: Number of goals for the national Olympic team whilst playing for Eintracht Braunschweig (final tournament only).
- U-21 C: Number of games for the national under-21 team whilst playing for Eintracht Braunschweig.
- U-21 G: Number of goals for the national under-21 team whilst playing for Eintracht Braunschweig.
- U-23 C: Number of games for the national under-23 team whilst playing for Eintracht Braunschweig.
- U-23 G: Number of goals for the national under-23 team whilst playing for Eintracht Braunschweig.
- B-NT C: Number of games for the national B team whilst playing for Eintracht Braunschweig.
- B-NT G: Number of goals for the national B team whilst playing for Eintracht Braunschweig.

Name	Country	Caps	Goals	OLY C	OLY G	U21 C	U21 G	U23 C	U23 G	B-NT C	B-NT G
Joachim Bäse	West Germany	1	0	0	0	0	0	0	0	0	0
Mushaga Bakenga	Norway	0	0	0	0	1	1	1	0	0	0
Emil Berggreen	Denmark	0	0	0	0	3	0	0	0	0	0
Magnús Bergs	Iceland	6	1	0	0	0	0	0	0	0	0
Ermin Bičakčić	Bosnia and Herzegovina	8	1	0	0	0	0	0	0	0	0
Hasse Borg	Sweden	39	4	0	0	0	0				
Serge Branco	Cameroon	0	0	5	0	0	0				
Konrad Bülte	Germany	1	0	0	0	0	0	0	0	0	0
Daniel Davari	Iran	4	0	0	0	0	0	0	0	0	0
Bernd Dörfel	West Germany	11	1	0	0	0	0	0	0	0	0
Wolfgang Dremmler	West Germany	0	0	0	0	0	0	0	0	1	0
Randy Edwini-Bonsu	Canada	3	0	0	0	0	0	2	0	0	0
Omar Elabdellaoui	Norway	7	0	0	0	5	0	0	0	0	0
Dietmar Erler	West Germany	0	0	0	0	0	0	1	0	0	0
Wolfgang Frank	West Germany	0	0	0	0	0	0	0	0	5	3
Bernd Franke	West Germany	7	0	4	0	0	0	0	0	6	0
Michael Geiger	West Germany	0	0	0	0	5	0	0	0	0	0
Bernd Gersdorff	West Germany	1	0	0	0	0	0	0	0	1	0
Klaus Gerwien	West Germany	6	1	0	0	0	0	1	0	0	0
Friedhelm Haebermann	West Germany	0	0	6	0	0	0	0	0	0	0
Karl-Heinz Handschuh	West Germany	0	0	0	0	0	0	0	0	1	0
Eberhard Haun	West Germany	0	0	0	0	0	0	2	0	1	1
Thomas Herbst	West Germany	0	0	0	0	6	2	0	0	0	0
Herbert Hofmann	West Germany	0	0	0	0	0	0	0	0	2	0
Reiner Hollmann	West Germany	0	0	0	0	0	0	0	0	2	0
Engjëll Hoti	Kosovo	0	0	0	0	1	0	0	0	0	0
Simeon Jackson	Canada	3	0	0	0	0	0	0	0	0	0
Bent Jensen	Denmark	2	0	0	0	0	0	0	0	0	0
Peter Kaack	West Germany	0	0	0	0	0	0	4	0	0	0
Armend Kabashi	Finland	0	0	0	0	4	0	0	0	0	0
Bekim Kastrati	Albania	1	0	0	0	0	0				
Salim Khelifi	Switzerland	0	0	0	0	7	1	0	0	0	0
Besfort Kolgeci	Kosovo	0	0	0	0	2	0	0	0	0	0
Jameleddine Limam	Tunisia	2	0	0	0	0	0				
Max Lorenz	West Germany	2	0	0	0	0	0	0	0	0	0
Peter Lux	West Germany	0	0	2	0	0	0	0	0	0	0
Erich Maas	West Germany	3	0	0	0	0	0	0	0	0	0
Mohamed Ali Mahjoubi	Tunisia	9	4	0	0	0	0				
Michél Mazingu-Dinzey	DR Congo	5	0	0	0	0	0				
Lirim Mema	Kosovo	0	0	0	0	2	0	0	0	0	0
Franz Merkhoffer	West Germany	0	0	0	0	0	0	1	0	0	0
Allan Michaelsen	Denmark	1	0	0	0	0	0	0	0	0	0
Harald Nickel	West Germany	0	0	0	0	0	0	0	0	2	0
Håvard Nielsen	Norway	11	1	0	0	0	0	0	0	0	0
Christoffer Nyman	Sweden	6	1	0	0	0	0	0	0	0	0
Phil Ofosu-Ayeh	Ghana	1	0	0	0	0	0	0	0	0	0
Nik Omladič	Slovenia	6	0	0	0	0	0	0	0	0	0
Denni Patschinsky	Germany	0	0	0	0	1	1	0	0	0	0
Danilo Popivoda	Yugoslavia	8	2	0	0	0	0				
Walter Poppe	Germany	1	0	0	0	0	0	0	0	0	0
Richard Queck	Germany	3	2	0	0	0	0	0	0	0	0
Gerd Saborowski	West Germany	0	0	0	0	0	0	3	0	0	0
Michael Scheike	West Germany	0	0	0	0	2	0	0	0	0	0
André Schembri	Malta	8	1	0	0	0	0				
Walter Schmidt	West Germany	0	0	0	0	0	0	0	0	1	0
Albert Sukop	Germany	1	0	0	0	0	0	0	0	0	0
Ilter Tashkin	Azerbaijan	1	0	0	0	8	0	0	0	0	0
Lothar Ulsaß	West Germany	10	8	0	0	0	0	0	0	1	0
Gustav Valsvik	Norway	4	0	0	0	0	0	0	0	0	0
Eric Veiga	Luxembourg	2	0	0	0	0	0	0	0	0	0
Damir Vrančić	Bosnia and Herzegovina	4	0	0	0	0	0	0	0	0	0
Horst Wolter	West Germany	13	0	0	0	0	0	0	0	0	0
Ronnie Worm	West Germany	0	0	0	0	0	0	0	0	2	2

== Eintracht Braunschweig players at international tournaments ==
=== FIFA World Cup ===
- (Bosnia and Herzegovina) Ermin Bičakčić: 2014
- (Sweden) Hasse Borg: 1978
- (Iran) Daniel Davari: 2014
- (West Germany) Bernd Franke: 1982
- (West Germany) Max Lorenz: 1970
- (West Germany) Horst Wolter: 1970

=== UEFA European Football Championship ===
- (Socialist Federal Republic of Yugoslavia) Danilo Popivoda: 1976

=== Africa Cup of Nations ===
- (Democratic Republic of the Congo) Michél Mazingu-Dinzey: 2004

=== CONCACAF Gold Cup ===
- (Canada) Simeon Jackson: 2013

=== Olympic Games ===
- (Cameroon) Serge Branco: 2000
- (West Germany) Bernd Franke: 1984
- (West Germany) Friedhelm Haebermann: 1972
- (West Germany) Peter Lux: 1984

=== UEFA European Under-21 Championship ===
- (Denmark) Emil Berggreen: 2015
- (Norway) Omar Elabdellaoui: 2013
- (West Germany) Michael Geiger: 1982

== Sources ==
- Eintracht Braunschweig at Fußballdaten.de (in German)
- Eintracht Braunschweig at Weltfußball.de (in German)
- Eintracht Braunschweig at Eu-football.info
- Bläsig, Horst/Leppert, Alex (2010). Ein Roter Löwe auf der Brust - Die Geschichte von Eintracht Braunschweig. Göttingen: Die Werkstatt. ISBN 978-3-89533-675-1.
- Heimann, Karl-Heinz/Jens, Karl-Heinz (1991). Kicker Almanach 1991. Das Fußballjahr im Taschenbuch. München: Copress. ISBN 978-3-76790-323-4.
- Heimann, Karl-Heinz/Jens, Karl-Heinz (1999). Kicker Fussball Almanach 2000. München: Copress. ISBN 978-3-76790-714-0.
- Hoffmeister, Kurt (1986). Meister und Medaillen. Braunschweigs Olympiasieger, Welt-, Europa-, Deutsche Meister 1946–1986. Braunschweig: Stadtbibliothek Braunschweig.
- Peters, Stefan (1998). Eintracht Braunschweig. Die Chronik. Kassel: Agon-Sportverlag. ISBN 978-3-89609-152-9.
