= 1966–67 Bundesliga =

4th season of the Bundesliga

Bundesliga
- Season: 1966–67
- Dates: 20 August 1966 – 3 June 1967
- Champions: Eintracht Braunschweig; 1st Bundesliga title 1st German title
- Relegated: Fortuna Düsseldorf; Rot-Weiss Essen
- European Cup: Eintracht Braunschweig
- Cup Winners' Cup: Bayern Munich (title holders); Hamburger SV (losing DFB Cup finalists to Bayern)
- Goals: 895
- Average goals/game: 2.92
- Top goalscorer: Lothar Emmerich (28); Gerd Müller (28)
- Biggest home win: M'gladbach 11–0 Schalke (7 January 1967)
- Biggest away win: Karlsruhe 1–6 FC Bayern (10 September 1966); Düsseldorf 0–5 Dortmund (7 January 1967)
- Highest scoring: M'gladbach 11–0 Schalke (11 goals) (7 January 1967)

The 1966–67 Bundesliga was the fourth season of the Bundesliga, West Germany's premier football league. It began on 20 August 1966 and ended on 3 June 1967. 1860 Munich were the defending champions.

== Competition modus ==
Every team played two games against each other team, one at home and one away. Teams received two points for a win and one point for a draw. If two or more teams were tied on points, places were determined by goal average. The team with the most points were crowned champions while the two teams with the fewest points were relegated to their respective Regionalliga divisions.

== Team changes to 1965–66 ==
Borussia Neunkirchen and Tasmania Berlin were relegated to the Regionalliga after finishing in the last two places. They were replaced by Fortuna Düsseldorf and Rot-Weiss Essen, who won their respective promotion play-off groups.

== Season overview ==
The 1966–67 season was surprisingly won by Eintracht Braunschweig. The Lower Saxony side, located near the border to the Soviet occupation zone, had previously been a mid-table team and were not expected to have anything to do with the title race before the season. But a strong defense, which only allowed 27 goals in 34 games, an unexpectedly even-balanced league and struggling opposition (for example, runners-up 1860 Munich were in 17th place after one third of the season before starting a comeback) eventually benefitted the team of coach Helmuth Johannsen.

In European competitions, the Cup Winners' Cup was transferred from Dortmund to another West German team as FC Bayern beat Rangers from Scotland on a Franz Roth goal in the final at Nuremberg. The team from Munich also defended their domestic cup title, enabling finalists Hamburger SV, who finished the season in a dismal 14th place, to enter the Cup Winners' Cup as well.

At the bottom side of the table, newly promoted sides Fortuna Düsseldorf and Rot-Weiss Essen had to leave the league again after only one year. The competitional differences between the professional Bundesliga and the semi-professional Regionalligen had already become very difficult to compensate so that the demotion of both teams was inevitable the more the season continued.

On a minor note, Meidericher SV was renamed MSV Duisburg effective to the start of the year 1967.

== Team overview ==
Location of teams in Bundesliga 1966–67

Club	Ground	Capacity
Eintracht Braunschweig	Eintracht-Stadion	38,000
SV Werder Bremen	Weserstadion	32,000
Borussia Dortmund	Stadion Rote Erde	30,000
MSV Duisburg	Wedaustadion	38,500
Fortuna Düsseldorf	Flinger Broich	28,000
Rot-Weiss Essen	Georg-Melches-Stadion	40,000
Eintracht Frankfurt	Waldstadion	87,000
Hamburger SV	Volksparkstadion	80,000
Hannover 96	Niedersachsenstadion	86,000
1. FC Kaiserslautern	Stadion Betzenberg	42,000
Karlsruher SC	Wildparkstadion	50,000
1. FC Köln	Müngersdorfer Stadion	76,000
Borussia Mönchengladbach	Bökelbergstadion	34,500
TSV 1860 Munich	Stadion an der Grünwalder Straße	44,300
FC Bayern Munich	Stadion an der Grünwalder Straße	44,300
1. FC Nürnberg	Städtisches Stadion	64,238
FC Schalke 04	Glückauf-Kampfbahn	35,000
VfB Stuttgart	Neckarstadion	53,000

== League table ==
Pos	Team	Pld	W	D	L	GF	GA	GR	Pts	Qualification or relegation
1	Eintracht Braunschweig (C)	34	17	9	8	49	27	1.815	43	Qualification to European Cup first round
2	1860 Munich	34	17	7	10	60	47	1.277	41	Qualification to Inter-Cities Fairs Cup first round
3	Borussia Dortmund	34	15	9	10	70	41	1.707	39	
4	Eintracht Frankfurt	34	15	9	10	66	49	1.347	39	Qualification to Inter-Cities Fairs Cup first round
5	1. FC Kaiserslautern	34	13	12	9	43	42	1.024	38	
6	Bayern Munich	34	16	5	13	62	47	1.319	37	Qualification to Cup Winners' Cup first round (Note: Bayern Munich won the 1966–67 European Cup Winners' Cup and thereby automatically qualified as defending champions. As Bayern also won the 1966–67 DFB-Pokal, runners-up Hamburger SV were given the European spot reserved for the domestic cup winners.)
7	1. FC Köln	34	14	9	11	48	48	1.000	37	Qualification to Inter-Cities Fairs Cup first round
8	Borussia Mönchengladbach	34	12	10	12	70	49	1.429	34	
9	Hannover 96	34	13	8	13	40	46	0.870	34	Qualification to Inter-Cities Fairs Cup first round
10	1. FC Nürnberg	34	12	10	12	43	50	0.860	34	
11	MSV Duisburg (Note: Meidericher SV changed their name to MSV Duisburg during the season.)	34	10	13	11	40	42	0.952	33	
12	VfB Stuttgart	34	10	13	11	48	54	0.889	33	
13	Karlsruher SC	34	11	9	14	54	62	0.871	31	
14	Hamburger SV	34	10	10	14	37	53	0.698	30	Qualification to Cup Winners' Cup first round
15	Schalke 04	34	12	6	16	37	63	0.587	30	
16	Werder Bremen	34	10	9	15	49	56	0.875	29	
17	Fortuna Düsseldorf (R)	34	9	7	18	44	66	0.667	25	Relegation to Regionalliga
18	Rot-Weiss Essen (R)	34	6	13	15	35	53	0.660	25	Relegation to Regionalliga

Source: www.dfb.de
Rules for classification: 1) points; 2) goal ratio.
(C) Champions; (R) Relegated

== Results ==
Home \ Away	EBS	SVW	BVB	DUI	F95	RWE	SGE	HSV	H96	FCK	KSC	KOE	BMG	M60	FCB	FCN	S04	VFB
Eintracht Braunschweig	—	2–0	3–1	0–0	4–0	0–0	3–0	2–0	0–1	2–0	4–1	1–0	2–1	1–0	5–2	4–1	1–0	1–1
Werder Bremen	2–3	—	2–1	1–1	1–0	0–0	3–0	5–1	3–0	1–1	0–3	1–3	2–2	2–4	4–1	4–4	2–1	1–2
Borussia Dortmund	0–0	2–0	—	4–1	1–2	0–0	3–1	7–0	3–0	2–1	2–1	6–1	3–2	1–1	4–0	0–1	6–2	1–1
MSV Duisburg	0–0	1–0	1–5	—	1–1	2–0	0–0	2–1	3–0	1–1	0–1	1–0	1–3	1–2	0–0	2–0	3–0	0–0
Fortuna Düsseldorf	1–1	0–1	0–5	1–5	—	2–0	2–4	2–2	1–0	3–1	1–0	1–3	2–2	0–1	0–0	2–2	3–1	3–3
Rot-Weiss Essen	0–0	0–1	1–1	0–1	0–4	—	1–1	1–1	3–0	1–1	3–1	1–3	2–1	2–2	3–1	1–1	4–1	1–3
Eintracht Frankfurt	0–1	4–1	3–3	1–0	3–0	5–0	—	1–3	3–3	1–1	5–1	4–0	1–0	3–3	2–1	1–4	4–2	4–0
Hamburger SV	1–0	1–1	1–1	0–0	2–1	1–1	0–2	—	2–1	1–0	1–0	1–3	2–0	3–2	3–1	0–1	1–1	1–1
Hannover 96	4–2	2–1	2–0	3–0	0–2	1–0	2–1	1–0	—	2–1	3–1	0–1	1–1	2–2	2–1	2–0	1–2	2–2
1. FC Kaiserslautern	2–0	2–0	1–1	0–0	2–1	5–2	1–1	2–1	1–0	—	3–1	0–0	1–0	0–3	1–0	1–1	1–0	3–3
Karlsruher SC	3–0	4–4	2–0	3–0	3–2	0–1	3–2	1–1	0–0	2–2	—	1–1	3–3	3–1	1–6	0–1	1–0	4–1
1. FC Köln	1–0	4–1	1–1	1–1	2–0	2–1	1–4	0–0	1–1	2–1	2–2	—	1–2	2–0	2–4	2–0	2–1	3–1
Borussia Mönchengladbach	0–0	1–1	4–0	3–3	3–1	4–3	0–0	4–2	2–0	1–1	3–1	3–0	—	2–3	1–2	2–0	11–0	1–2
1860 Munich	2–1	2–1	1–2	3–3	3–0	1–0	2–1	2–0	3–0	3–0	3–0	2–1	4–3	—	1–0	1–2	0–2	1–1
Bayern Munich	2–0	1–0	1–0	2–1	1–2	4–1	1–2	3–1	0–0	5–0	2–2	2–0	4–3	3–0	—	0–1	5–0	1–1
1. FC Nürnberg	0–4	2–1	2–0	3–1	4–2	1–1	0–1	1–0	1–1	1–2	2–2	1–1	1–0	2–2	0–1	—	0–4	3–3
Schalke 04	0–0	0–1	1–4	2–1	2–1	1–1	1–1	2–0	2–1	0–3	1–3	1–0	0–0	1–0	2–1	1–0	—	2–0
VfB Stuttgart	1–2	1–1	1–0	1–3	3–1	1–0	3–0	1–3	1–2	0–1	2–0	2–2	0–2	2–0	2–4	1–0	1–1	—

Source: DFB
Legend: Blue = home team win; Yellow = draw; Red = away team win.

== Top goalscorers ==
28 goals

- (Germany) Lothar Emmerich (Borussia Dortmund)
- (Germany) Gerd Müller (FC Bayern Munich)

18 goals

- (Germany) Herbert Laumen (Borussia Mönchengladbach)

17 goals

- (Germany) Christian Müller (Karlsruher SC)

15 goals

- (Germany) Jupp Heynckes (Borussia Mönchengladbach)
- (Germany) Bernd Rupp (Borussia Mönchengladbach)
- (Germany) Lothar Ulsaß (Eintracht Braunschweig)
- (Germany) Reinhold Wosab (Borussia Dortmund)

14 goals

- (Germany) Hans Küppers (TSV 1860 Munich)

13 goals

- (Germany) Hannes Löhr (1. FC Köln)

== Champion squad ==
Eintracht Braunschweig
Goalkeepers: Horst Wolter (32); Hans Jäcker (2).

Defenders: Jürgen Moll (34 / 5); Peter Kaack (34); Walter Schmidt (33); Klaus Meyer (30); Wolfgang Matz (5); Wolfgang Brase (3).
Midfielders: Joachim Bäse (33); Hans-Georg Dulz (32 / 5).
Forwards: Erich Maas (33 / 11); Gerd Saborowski (33 / 8); Lothar Ulsaß (32 / 14); Klaus Gerwien (21 / 4); Wolfgang Grzyb (15 / 2); Wolf-Rüdiger Krause (2).
(league appearances and goals listed in brackets)

Manager: Helmuth Johannsen.

On the roster but have not played in a league game: Wolfgang Simon; Werner Rinas.

== See also ==
- 1966–67 DFB-Pokal
