= Brase =

Brase is a German surname. Notable people with the surname include:

- Chris Brase (born 1962), American politician
- Fritz Brase (1875–1940), German military musician and composer resident in Ireland
- Hans Brase (born 1993), American-German basketball player
- Matt Brase (born 1982), American basketball player and coach
- Willi Brase (born 1951), German politician
- Wolfgang Brase (1939–2026), German footballer

== See also ==
- Braase, another surname
