= BSV Ölper 2000 =

German football and sports club

- Full name: Braunschweiger Sportverein; Ölper von 2000 e.V.
- Founded: June 15, 2000; 24 years ago
- Ground: Sportplatz Biberweg
- League: Landesliga Braunschweig (VI)
- 2015–16: 9th
- Website: www.bsv-oelper2000.de
Home colours	Away colours

BSV Ölper 2000 is a German association football and sports club from the city of Braunschweig, Lower Saxony.

== History ==
The club was formed on 15 June 2000 as a merger between Braunschweiger SV 1922 and Sportfreunde Ölper. Both clubs had previously shared a ground, Sportplatz Biberweg, in the Ölper district of Braunschweig.

BSV 22 Braunschweig was formed on 22 August 1922 and following World War II and reestablished as Ballspielverein von 1945, before returning to its original name in 1949. SF Ölper was founded in 1929.

While BSV 22 was the more successful senior side of the two, having spent multiple seasons at the highest state-level of football in Lower Saxony through the 1990s, SF Ölper was well known for its youth teams. Two future German internationals, Tobias Rau and Alexander Madlung, got their start at the club.

In its first season after the merger, the new club was promoted to the Niedersachsenliga-Ost (V) where they would play until being relegated in 2010. The following Landesliga Braunschweig (VI) season also ended in relegation. After one season in the 7th tier Bezirksliga Braunschweig 2, the club returned to Landesliga play for the 2012–13 season.

== Honours ==
- Landesliga Braunschweig (VI):
  - Champions (1): 2001
- Bezirksliga Braunschweig 2 (VII):
  - Champions (1): 2012

== Notable former players ==
The list includes former players of BSV Ölper 2000 and its predecessors who made appearances in professional football before or after playing for the club:

- (Turkey) Özkan Koçtürk
- (Germany) Alexander Madlung (SF Ölper)
- (Serbia) Goran Radojević (BSV 22)
- (Germany) Tobias Rau (SF Ölper)
- (Germany) Holger Wehlage

== Manager history ==
- Heinz-Günter Scheil (2004–2007)
- Willi Feer (2007–2009)
- Holger Wehlage (2009–2010)
- Thomas Schneider (2010–2013)
- Andreas Müller / Stephan Pientak (2013–2015)
- Gertjan Durishti / Chris Borgsdorf (2015–2016)
- Mesut Dereköy / Gertjan Durishti (2016–)

== Other sports ==
Besides its football division, BSV Ölper 2000 also has departments for badminton, gymnastics, nine-pin bowling, team handball, swimming, and tennis.
