= Essehof Zoo =

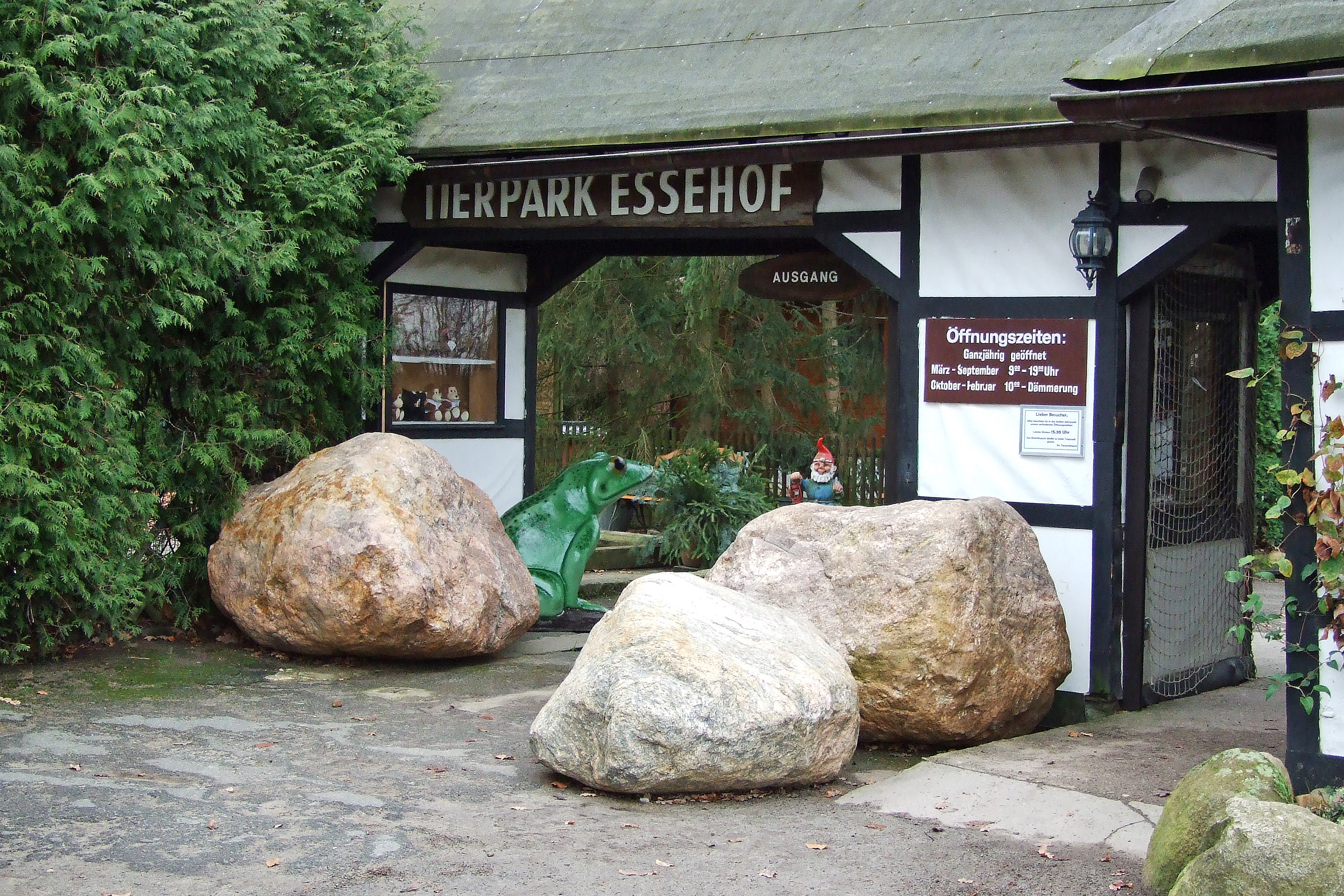
- Zoo entrance
- Interactive map of Essehof Zoo
- 52°18′21.1″N 10°39′51.9″E
- Date opened: 1968
- Location: Essehof, Lehre, Lower Saxony, Germany
- Land area: 10 hectares (25 acres)
- No. of animals: 260
- No. of species: 50
- Memberships: WAZA, DTG, DWV
- Major exhibits: Australia House, Deer Park, Water Nature Trail, Petting and Feeding Zoo
- Owner: Uwe Wilhelm GmbH
- Website: www.tierpark-essehof.de

Essehof Zoo (German: Tierpark Essehof) is a privately owned and operated zoo located in Essehof, a town within the municipality of Lehre, Lower Saxony, Germany. It opened in 1968 and currently consists of 10 hectares (25 acres). It is located about 13 km (8.1 mi) northeast of Braunschweig.

== Zoo ==
Werner Beller officially opened the zoo on Good Friday in 1968 and the zoo has continued to grow since then. In 1974 a new coffee house was built, followed by construction of new animal stalls and enclosures between 1976 and 1978. In 1988 a new monkey house was completed. The zoo was purchased by Uwe Wilhelm GmbH in 1991 and continues to run as a privately owned zoo. Following the change in ownership, renovations and additions continued to increase the number of exhibits. A water nature trail that is unique to northern Germany was opened in 2002 that included an underwater viewing area 3 metres (9.8 feet) below the surface of the water as well as a 30 metres (98.4 feet) long wooden bridge. An Australian exhibit was opened and the deer park was renovated in 2007.

Uwe Wilhelm GmbH also owns the nearby "Noah's Ark" zoo in Braunschweig. The zoo does not receive any public funding.

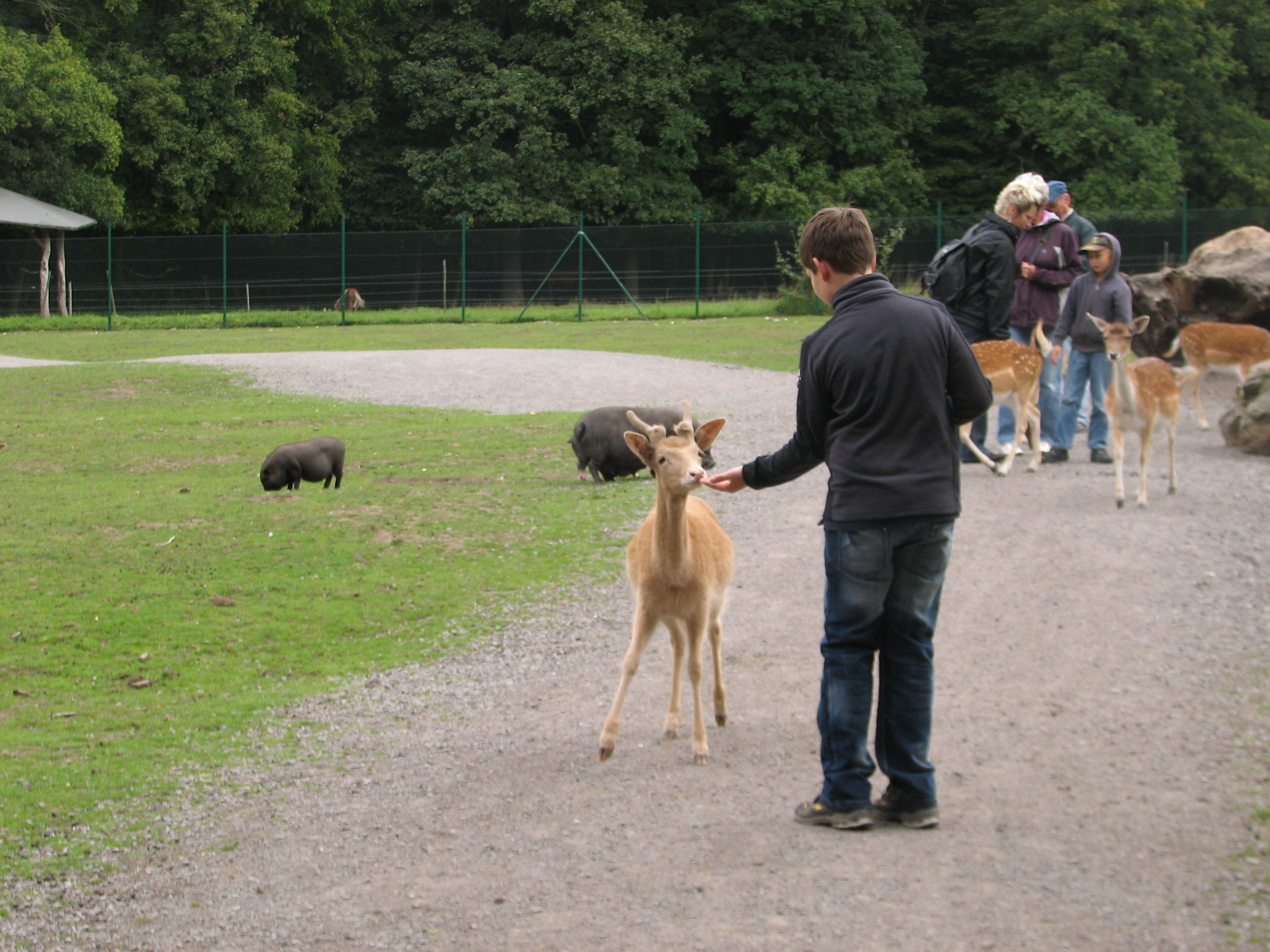
Visitors feeding the animals

== Animals ==
The zoo houses 260 animals representing 50 different species from rare domestic animals to animals from Africa, Australia and South America. Several of the animals include racka, kangaroo, raccoon, zebra, watussi cattle, meerkats, nutria and gibbon.

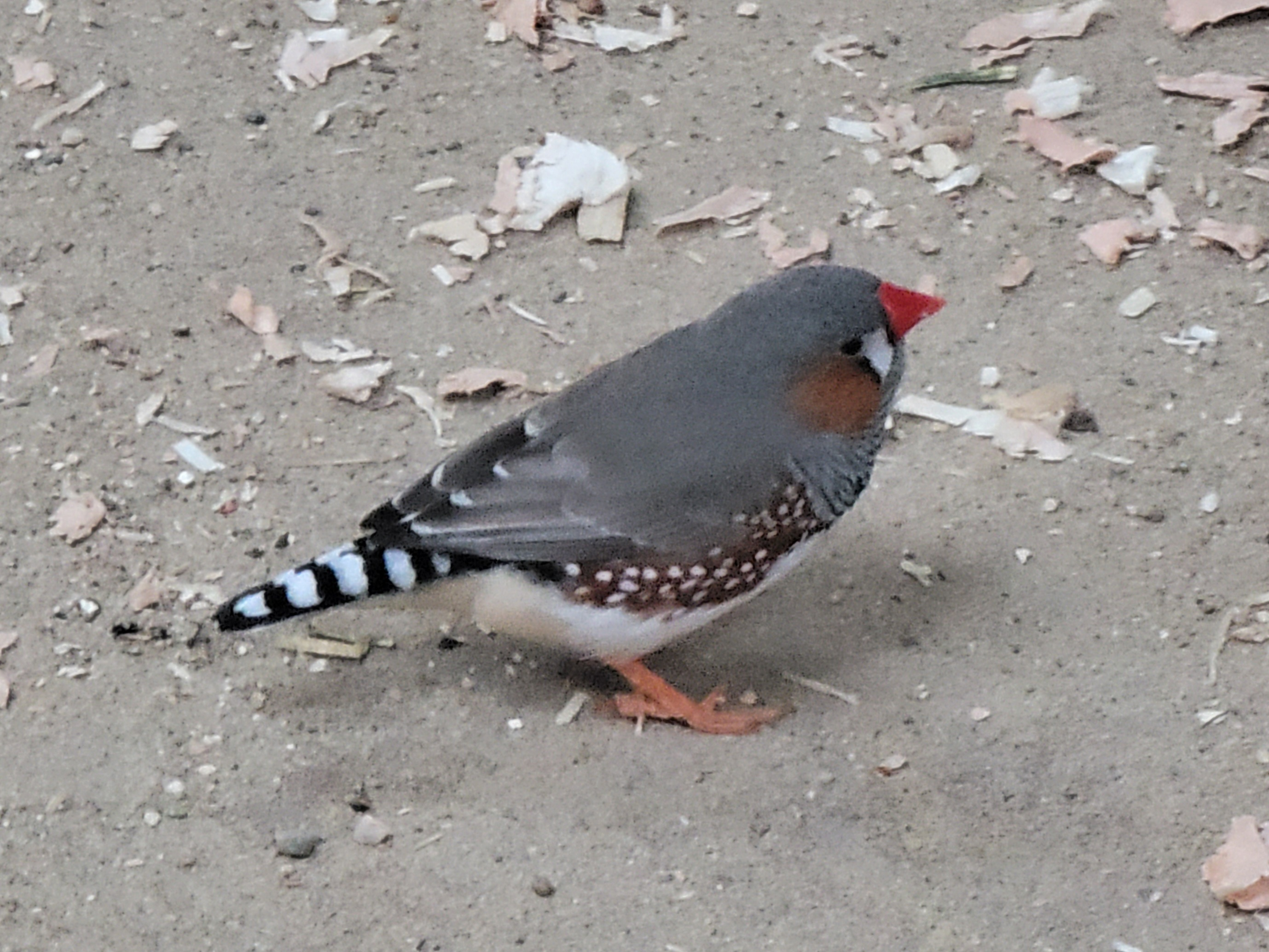
Zebra Finch (Taeniopygia guttata) in the Parakeet and Finch exhibit

In addition to scheduled feedings, there is a petting zoo where visitors can get close with the animals. Food can also be purchased to feed the animals.

== Membership ==
Essehof Zoo is part of several German and international zoo and animal associations. It is part of the Deutsche Tierparkgesellschaft (German Zoo Society) and Deutscher-Wildgehege-Verband (German Game Preserve). At an international level, it is part of the WAZA (World Association of Zoos and Aquariums).
