= Landesliga Braunschweig =

- Founded: 1979
- Country: Germany
- State: Lower Saxony
- Number of clubs: 18
- Level on pyramid: Level 6
- Promotion to: Oberliga Niedersachsen
- Relegation to: Bezirksliga Braunschweig 1-4
- Current champions: SSV Vorsfelde (2025–26)

The Landesliga Braunschweig, called the Bezirksoberliga Braunschweig from 1979 to 1994 and 2006 to 2010, is the sixth tier of the German football league system and the second highest league in the German state of Lower Saxony (German: Niedersachsen). It covers the region of the now defunct Regierungsbezirk Braunschweig.

It is one of four leagues at this level in Lower Saxony, the other three being the Landesliga Lüneburg, the Landesliga Weser-Ems and the Landesliga Hannover.

The term Landesliga can be translated as State league.

== Overview ==
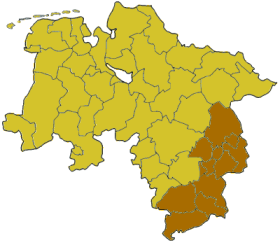
Map of Lower Saxony:Position of the Braunschweig region highlighted

The league's history goes back to 1979, when four new Bezirksoberligas (Braunschweig, Hannover, Lüneburg and Weser-Ems) were formed in the state of Lower Saxony. The Bezirksoberligas (6th tier) were set below the Verbandsliga Niedersachsen (4th tier) and the two Landesligas (5th tier) in the German football league system. In 1994, the two old Landesligas were dissolved, while the four Bezirksoberligas were renamed into Landesliga Braunschweig, Landesliga Hannover, Landesliga Lüneburg, and Landesliga Weser-Ems respectively. Due to the introduction of the new Regionalliga (IV) the new Landesligas still remained at the 6th tier of German football, however.

In 2006, the Landesliga was renamed into Bezirksoberliga again. The new Bezirksoberliga Braunschweig was made up of fifteen clubs, two from the Verbandsliga Niedersachsen-Ost, eleven from the Landesliga and one from the two Bezirksligas each. The league was formed in a reorganisation of the league system in Lower Saxony, whereby the four regional Landsligas were replaced by the Bezirksoberligas. Below these, the number of Bezirksligas was increased. In Braunschweig, the two Bezirksligas were expanded to four, as in the other regions, except Weser-Ems, which was expanded to five.

The Bezirksoberliga, like the Landesliga before, was set in the league system below the Verbandsliga and above the now four Bezirksligas, which were numbered from one to four. The winner of the Bezirksoberliga was directly promoted to the Verbandsliga, while the bottom placed teams, in a varying number, were relegated to the Bezirksliga. The Bezirksoberligas of Weser-Ems and Hannover form the tier below the Verbandsliga West, while those of Lüneburg and Braunschweig form the tier below the eastern division of the Verbandsliga.

In the leagues first season, 2006–07, the runners-up of the league, SCW Göttingen, was also promoted, like the runners-up from Lüneburg. In the following season, only the league champions were promoted while, in 2009, Lupo Martini Wolfsburg moved up a level as runners-up.

At the end of the 2007-08 season, with the introduction of the 3. Liga, the Verbandsliga was renamed Oberliga Niedersachsen-Ost. For the Bezirksoberliga, this had no direct consequences.

After the 2009-10 season, the two Oberligas (English: Premier league) in Lower Saxony were merged to one single division. The four Bezirksoberliga champions that season were not automatically promoted, instead they had to compete with the four teams placed ninth and tenth in the Oberliga for four more spots in this league.

On 17 May 2010, the Lower Saxony football association decided to rename the four Bezirksoberligas to Landesligas from 1 July 2010. This change in name came alongside the merger of the two Oberliga divisions above it into the Oberliga Niedersachsen.

== Champions ==
The league champions of the Bezirksoberliga and Landesliga Braunschweig since 1979:

=== Bezirksoberliga Braunschweig 1979–1994 ===
- 1980: 1. SC Göttingen 05 II
- 1981: SVG Einbeck
- 1982: VfR Eintracht Wolfsburg
- 1983: Vorwärts Gebhardshagen
- 1984: TSG Hannoversch Münden
- 1985: Sportfreunde Salzgitter
- 1986: FC Schöningen 08
- 1987: VfR Langelsheim
- 1988: SV Union Salzgitter
- 1989: Braunschweiger SV 22
- 1990: VfB Peine
- 1991: SV Südharz Walkenried
- 1992: Tuspo Petershütte
- 1993: SSV Vorsfelde
- 1994: Goslarer SC 08

=== Landesliga Braunschweig 1994–2006 ===
- 1995: VfL Wolfsburg Am.
- 1996: SVG Einbeck
- 1997: Braunschweiger SV 22
- 1998: TSV Holtensen
- 1999: Grün-Weiß Vallstedt
- 2000: FT Braunschweig
- 2001: BSV Ölper 2000
- 2002: Eintracht Northeim
- 2003: SC Weende
- 2004: TSV Helmstedt
- 2005: Goslarer SC 08
- 2006: VfB Fallersleben

=== Bezirksoberliga Braunschweig 2006–2010 ===
Season	Champions	Runners-up	Third
2006–07	**SSV Vorsfelde**	**SCW Göttingen**	Lupo Martini Wolfsburg
2007–08	**Goslarer SC 08**	SVG Göttingen	TuSpo Petershütte
2008–09	**SVG Göttingen**	**Lupo Martini Wolfsburg**	MTV Wolfenbüttel
2009–10	SV Dostluk Spor Osterode	MTV Wolfenbüttel	TSV Hillerse

=== Landesliga Braunschweig 2010–present ===
Season	Champions	Runners-up	Third
2010–11	**RSV Göttingen 05**	SC Acosta Braunschweig	FT Braunschweig
2011–12	**Lupo Martini Wolfsburg**	FT Braunschweig	SSV Kästorf
2012–13	**FT Braunschweig**	TuSpo Petershütte	SVG Göttingen
2013–14	**Eintracht Northeim**	MTV Wolfenbüttel	SVG Göttingen
2014–15	**SVG Göttingen**	SSV Vorsfelde	FC Braunschweig Süd
2015–16	**MTV Gifhorn**	SSV Vorsfelde	SV Lengede
2016–17	**SSV Vorsfelde**	SCW Göttingen	MTV Wolfenbüttel
2017–18	**MTV Wolfenbüttel**	TSC Vahdet Braunschweig	FT Braunschweig
2018–19	**FT Braunschweig**	SSV Kästorf	SVG Göttingen 07
2019–20	**SVG Göttingen 07**	SSV Kästorf	TSC Vahdet Braunschweig
2020–21	Season curtailed and annulled by COVID-19 pandemic in Germany		
2021–22	**FSV Schöningen**	SSV Vorsfelde	SV Lengede
2022–23	**SSV Vorsfelde**	MTV Wolfenbüttel	SSV Nörten-Hardenberg
2023–24	**Eintracht Braunschweig II**	1. SC Göttingen 05	MTV Wolfenbüttel
2024–25	**MTV Wolfenbüttel**	SSV Kästorf	1. SC Göttingen 05
2025–26	**SSV Vorsfelde**	MTV Gifhorn	SSV Kästorf

- Promoted teams in **bold**.
