= Lehre =

- Municipality
- Coat of arms

- Location of Lehre within Helmstedt district
- Interactive map of Lehre
- Location within Germany Location within Lower Saxony
- Coordinates: 52°19′N 10°40′E
- Country: Germany
- State: Lower Saxony
- District: Helmstedt
- Subdivisions: 8

Government
  - Mayor (2021–26): Andreas Busch

Area
  - Total: 71.96 km^{2} (27.78 sq mi)
- Elevation: 80 m (260 ft)

Population (2025-12-31)
  - Total: 11,804
  - Density: 164.0/km^{2} (424.9/sq mi)
- Time zone: UTC+01:00 (CET)
  - Summer (DST): UTC+02:00 (CEST)
- Postal codes: 38165
- Dialling codes: 05308, 05309
- Vehicle registration: HE
- Website: www.lehre.de

Lehre (German pronunciation: [ˈleːʁə]) is a municipality in the district of Helmstedt, in Lower Saxony, Germany. The current population is 11,539 and is situated approximately 13 km (8.1 mi) southwest of Wolfsburg, and 12 km (7.5 mi) Braunschweig.

The municipality received the name of Lehre on 10 June 888 and is made up of eight surrounding villages. They are Beienrode, Essehof, Essenrode, Flechtorf, Groß Brunsrode, Klein Brunsrode, Lehre, and Wendhausen with Lehre being the largest.

== History ==
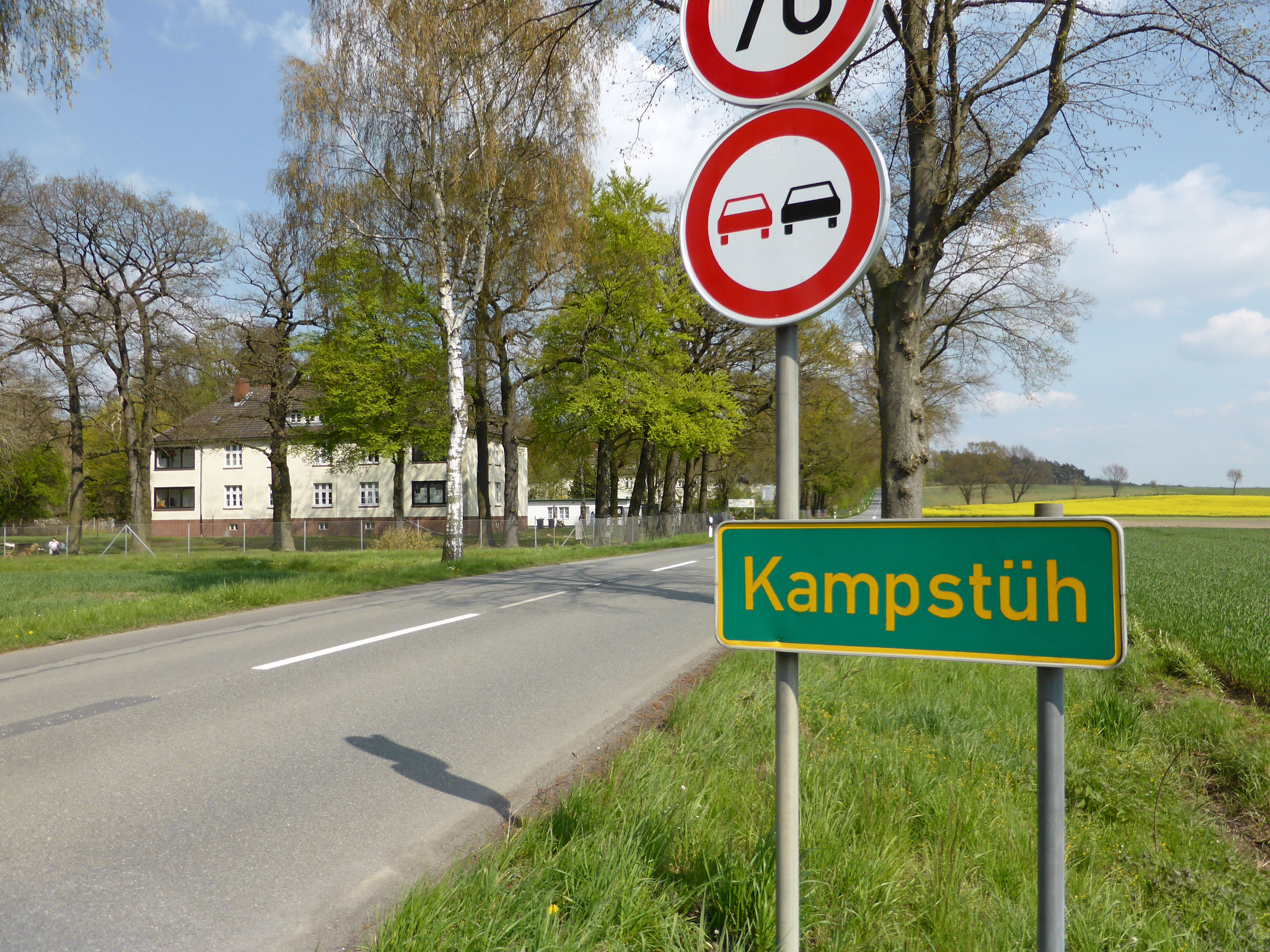
Kampstüh

In 1934, construction began on the Army Ammunition Institute in the Kampstüh Forest 2.4 km (1.5 mi) east Lehre. More than 100 buildings on 225 hectares (556 acres) were constructed and was connected to the railway system. The Institute produced ammunition for infantry weapons, anti-tank mines, tank shells, artillery guns and .38 cm. Up until February 1945, 6,000 tons of chemical weapons were transported to the institute. It was not bombed during World War II and up until the end war, most of these weapons remained on site. In 1945, the location also housed Russian prisoners of war. On 11 April 1945, the area was liberated by the United States' 5th Armored Division and the Army Ammunition Institute was occupied without a fight. In mid 1945, the area was handed over to British troops who had a local presence until 1951. Today, many original buildings still remain standing and some are still in use.

== Transport ==
=== Road ===
Lehre is located on State Road (Landesstraße) L295 which provides access to freeways A2 and A39.

=== Train ===
Lehre rail service began when the Brunswick State Railway Company completed the Schunter Valley Railway in 1904, connecting Braunschweig with Fallersleben. This line officially ceased operation in 1998 following the opening of the Weddel loop which connected Wolfsburg and Braunschweig, bypassing Lehre.

== Nearby Attractions ==
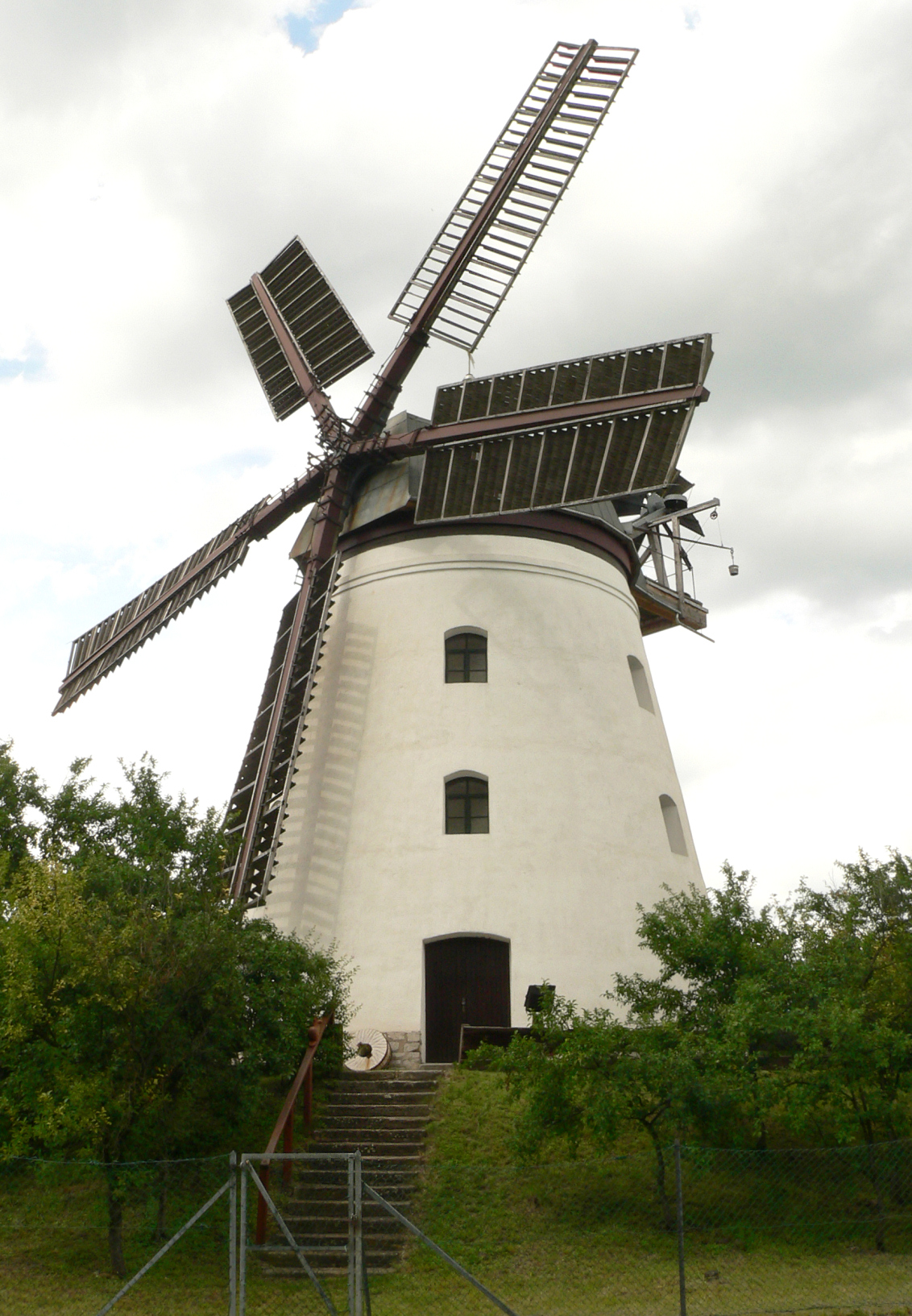
Wendhausen Windmill

- Campen Castle - A partially standing castle built in the late 13th century.
- Essehof Zoo
- Essenrode Manor - A late Baroque-style manor built in 1738
- Holy Cross Church - A historic 13th century church located in Lehre
- Wendhausen Castle - A moated 17th century residence. It has an inner courtyard and Baroque-style garden with ivy covering its walls.
- Wendhausen Windmill - A large five-sail Dutch-style windmill

== Notable people ==
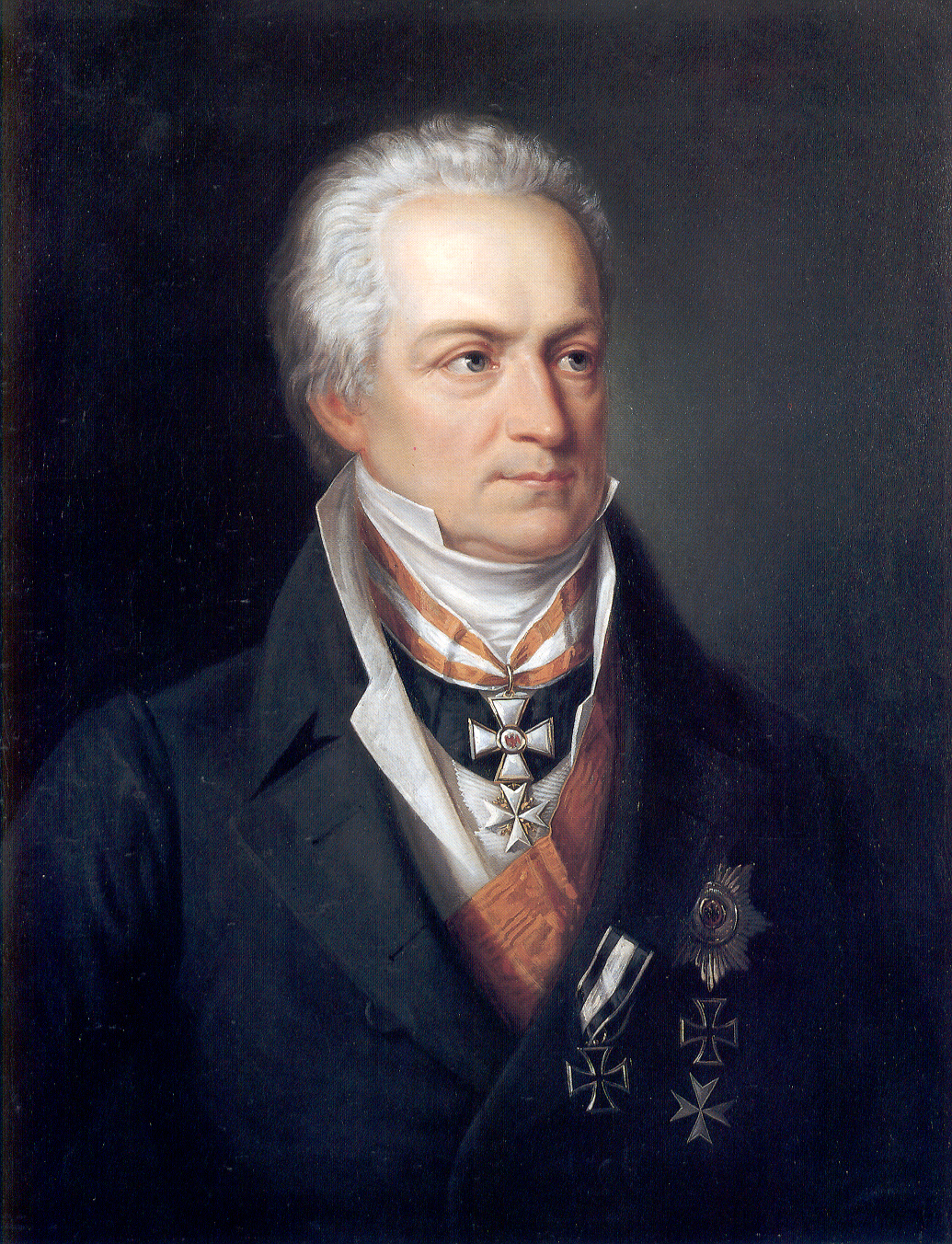
Karl August von Hardenberg

- Karl August von Hardenberg (1750–1822) - Former Prime Minister of Prussia
- Hans, Count von Bülow (1774-1825) - Former Prussian politician
- Eberhard Haun (1949-1976) - Professional soccer player
- August Hermann (1835–1906) - Sports educator who helped create school sports in Germany
