= Holy Cross Church, Lehre =

Holy Cross Church
- German: Heilig-Kreuz-Kirche
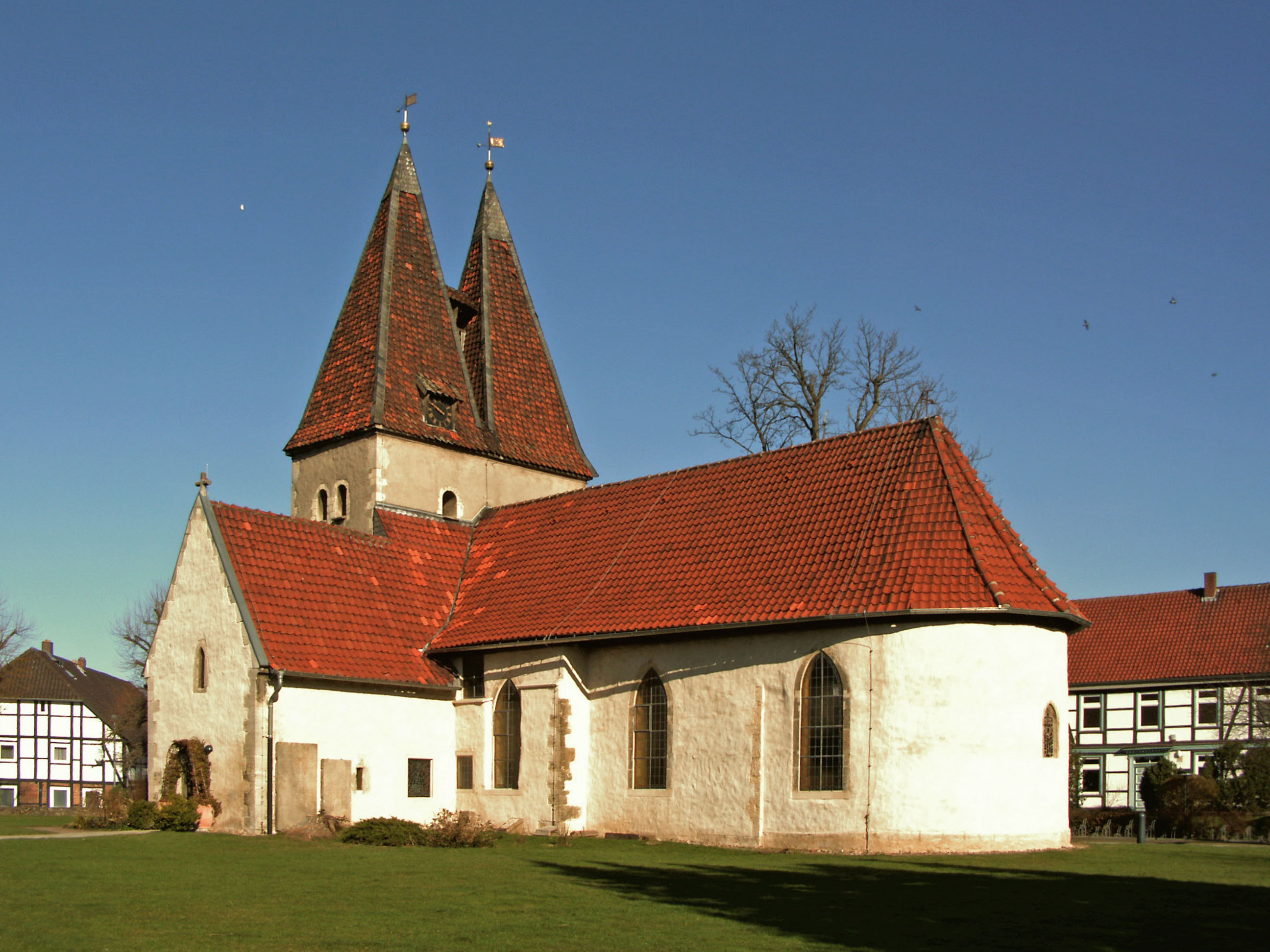

- Location within Lower Saxony Location within Germany
- 52°19′53.349″N 10°40′12.5349″E
- Location: Mühlenwinkel 1, Lehre
- Country: Germany
- Denomination: Lutheran
- Previous denomination: Catholic
- Website: Holy Cross Church(in German)

History
- Status: parish church

Architecture
- Functional status: active
- Architectural type: aisleless church quire
- Style: Romanesque; Baroque (interior)
- Groundbreaking: 1200s
- Completed: by 1214

Administration
- Parish: Lehre Congregation (Kirchengemeinde Lehre)

Clergy
- Pastor: Joachim Schreiber

The Holy Cross Church (German: Heilig-Kreuz-Kirche, more formal also: Kirche zum Heiligen Kreuz) is a church located in the town of Lehre, Germany. It is currently a Lutheran church and part of the Evangelical Lutheran Church in Brunswick, which owns around 480 churches.

== History ==
=== Exterior ===
The first mention of the community of Lehre was in 888 in old manuscripts at the Fulda monastery. Construction of the church began in the late 12th century or early 13th century. A date inscription found on the tower dates the construction and possible completion of the church to 1214. The church consists of a large square tower with two tall spires, each with four-sided, pyramidical roofs. They give the church a unique look. The two spires are connected by a wooden bridge, jokingly said to be the highest bridge in Lower Saxony. The main tower has round-arched windows facing each direction.

During the next several centuries, the church underwent a series of reconstructions and additions. In 1489, a porch was added to the southern wall. A semicircular choir on the eastern wall was also added in the 15th century. There is still a small walled-arched window on the north wall that dates from the first phase of the Romanesque period.

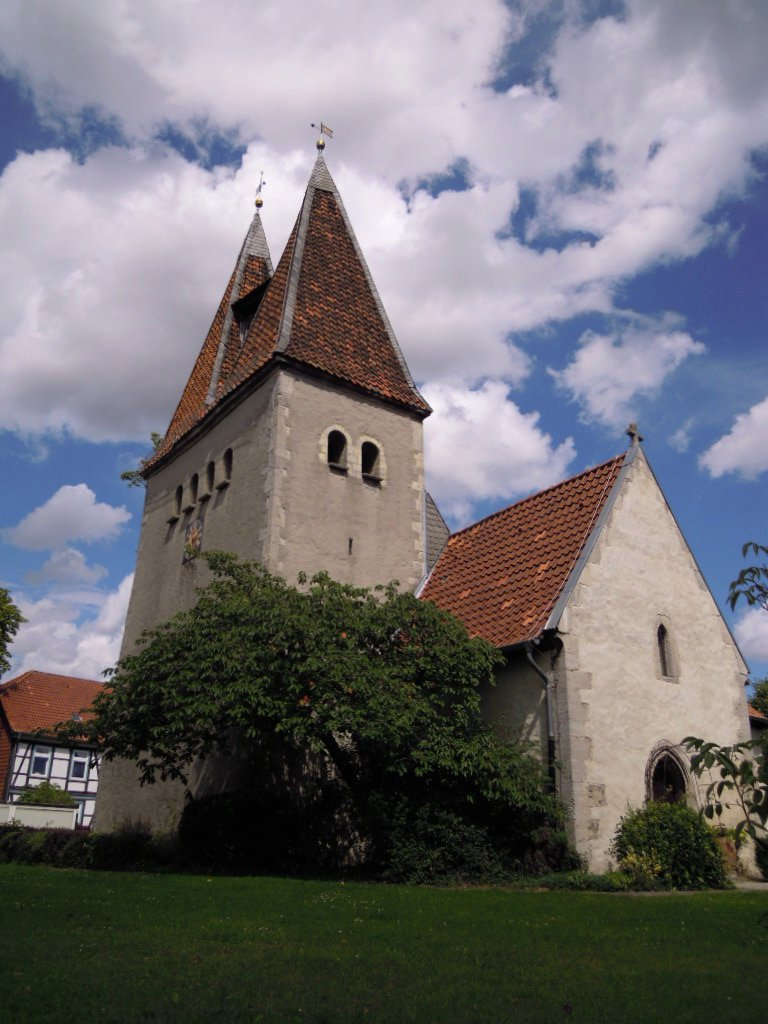
Holy Cross Church – Lehre

Following the Thirty Years' War, Pastor Bernhard Friedrich Lasdorff, who arrived in 1646, became a strong advocate for reconstructing the semi-dilapidated church and spearheaded a number of major changes beginning in 1649. A new bell was cast, weighing 924 pounds (419 kg), with the inscription, "Zu Gottes Ehre in Lehre (To the Glory of God in Lehre)". The roof and walls were expanded by 6 feet (1.8 m) while the gabled roof was upgraded with a polygonal design. Large, pointed-arch windows of the nave and chancel also date from this time. Upon completion of the repair work, the church was given the name "Holy Cross" and given the patron St. Laurentius. Since the surrounding community was unable to fund the reconstruction, they relied heavily on large donations. Donations were received from the larger cities of Lüneburg, Braunschweig, and Fallersleben. Other donations came from dukes, monasteries, and well-off citizens. In 1674 another bell was cast weighing over 1,100 pounds (500 kg). In the 18th century the two steeples were renovated along with the two church clocks. One clock is located on the western wall of the main tower structure and the other faces east on the roof of the southern steeple.

=== Interior ===
The basement is supported by two large arches. In 1649, along with numerous exterior changes, the nave was redesigned in a Baroque style with ornate murals, a flat stucco ceiling was installed, and depictions of Martin Luther and Philipp Melanchthon were also added. In 1766 the pulpit was moved to the south wall and the northern and western mezzanines were restored to include paintings of 20 Old and New Testament scenes. Wall paintings and panel decorations were rediscovered after being painted over in 1833; these were restored in 1910 by Adolf Quensen. An organ reredos dating to 1833 was removed in 1965. Additional restoration of paintings was completed between 1987 and 1991.

== Today ==
The church currently houses an Evangelical Lutheran congregation. It currently accommodates weddings, baptisms, confirmations, funerals, and other church-related events.
