= Braase =

Braase is a surname. Notable people with the surname include:

- Ib Braase (1923–2009), Danish sculptor
- Ordell Braase (1932–2019), American football player

== See also ==
- Brase, another surname
