= MTV Wolfenbüttel =

German football and sports club

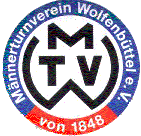
- Full name: Männerturnverein Wolfenbüttel e. V. von 1848
- Founded: 1848
- Ground: Meesche-Stadion
- Manager: Michael Nietz
- League: Landesliga Braunschweig (VI)
- 2025–26: Oberliga Niedersachsen (V), 13th of 16 (relegated)

MTV Wolfenbüttel is a German association football and sports club based in Wolfenbüttel, Lower Saxony.

== History ==
=== MTV Wolfenbüttel (1848–1945) ===
MTV Wolfenbüttel was founded as a gymnastics club in 1848. A football section was founded in 1911. During the 1922–23 season, MTV played in the Südkreisliga (later renamed Oberliga Südhannover/Braunschweig), at the time the first-tier of football in Germany. After World War II, MTV Wolfenbüttel and several other clubs from the city were merged into a new club, Wolfenbütteler SV (WSV). Although MTV Wolfenbüttel was re-founded in 1948, the club didn't re-established a football section on its own until several decades later.

=== Wolfenbütteler SV (1945–2002) ===
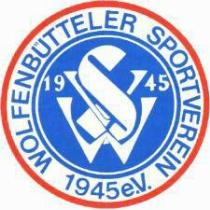
Historical logo of Wolfenbütteler SV.

From 1949 to 1964, Wolfenbütteler SV played in the second-tier Amateuroberliga Niedersachsen. After several seasons in the lower regional divisions, WSV won promotion to the Oberliga Nord (III) in 1986 and stayed there until relegation in 1991. The club returned to the Oberliga-level for one last time in 1996, when they spent four seasons in the Oberliga Niedersachsen/Bremen.

==== Honours ====
The club's honours:

- Oberliga Niedersachsen-Süd (I):
  - Runners-up (1): 1946
- Verbandsliga Niedersachsen-Ost (IV):
  - Champions (1): 1966
  - Runners-up (5): 1967, 1969, 1972, 1973, 1974
- Verbandsliga Niedersachsen (IV):
  - Runners-up (2): 1981, 1983
- Niedersachsenliga-Ost (V):
  - Champions (1): 1996
  - Runners-up (1): 1995
- Lower Saxony Cup:
  - Winners (1): 1965

=== MTV Wolfenbüttel (since 2002) ===
In 2002, Wolfenbütteler SV was merged into MTV Wolfenbüttel. Since the merger, the club's men's side has played mostly at the upper levels of local amateur football. Currently, the team competes in the sixth-tier Landesliga Braunschweig.

The club's women's side qualified for the inaugural season of the Women's 2. Bundesliga in 2004. MTV Wolfenbüttel was relegated back to the Regionalliga after the 2005–06 season.

=== Notable former players ===
The list includes former players of MTV Wolfenbüttel and Wolfenbütteler SV who made appearances in professional football before or after playing for the club:

- (Germany) Uwe Hain
- (West Germany) Peter Lux
- (Bosnia and Herzegovina) Miloš Nedić
- (Serbia) Goran Radojević

=== Notable former managers ===
- (West Germany) Ferdinand Fabra (1946–1947)
- (Germany) Wolfgang Grobe (1990–1991)
- (Germany) Michael Lorkowski (2003–2005)
- (Germany) Peter Lux (1995–1999; 2008–2014)

== Basketball ==
Founded in 1956, the basketball section of MTV Wolfenbüttel was one of the founding members of the Basketball Bundesliga in 1966 and won the German Basketball Cup in 1971–72 and 1981–82.
