= Lupo Martini Wolfsburg =

German football club

- Full name: Unione Sportiva Italiana Lupo-Martini Wolfsburg e.V.
- Founded: 1962
- Ground: Lupo-Stadion
- Capacity: 1,500
- Chairman: Rocco Lochiatto
- Coach: Francisco Coppi
- League: Landesliga Braunschweig (VI)
- 2025–26: Oberliga Niedersachsen (V), 15th of 16 (relegated)
- Website: https://lupomartini.com/
Home colours	Away colours

Lupo Martini Wolfsburg is a German association football club from the city of Wolfsburg, Lower Saxony. The club's greatest success has been promotion to the tier four Regionalliga Nord in 2015–16.

The original club, Sportclub Lupo, was formed in 1962 by Italian migrant workers (German: Gastarbeiter) at the Volkswagen factory in Wolfsburg, and merged in 1981 with another Italian migrant worker club, US Martini which was formed in 1970, to form the current club. Lupo is the Italian word for wolf, in reference to the city's name, Wolfsburg. While originally formed by Italian nationals, the club nowadays has a more diverse membership base, with more than 50% made up by non-Italians.

== History ==
ISC Lupo was formed in 1962 with the help of the social department of Volkswagen and the local football federation to assist Italian migrant workers in Wolfsburg in acclimatising to their new environment and to provide a connection to their home country. Lupo was the first migrant workers' club in Germany and the first to enter competitive football; it was well supported, attracting more than 1,000 spectators to its home games in the local amateur leagues. Originally the club only played friendlies as clubs in the German league system could only field one foreigner per team; when these rules were changed for amateur teams, Lupo was allowed to enter competitive football.

In 1970 a second Italian-based club was formed in the city, US Martini, and the two quickly developed a strong rivalry. By then, Wolfsburg had a 12,000-strong Italian community. The two clubs eventually merged in 1981 to form the current Lupo Martini Wolfsburg. The club used the Platz an der Berliner Brücke as its home ground, nowadays the location of the Volkswagen Arena, home of Bundesliga club VfL Wolfsburg.

The club spent most of its footballing history in local amateur leagues, rising as high as the tier six Landesliga Braunschweig in the early 2000s. After relegation from this level in 2002, it returned in 2005. In 2009, it won promotion to the eastern division of the tier five Niedersachsenliga. Despite finishing in tenth place, Lupo Martini was relegated at the end of the season as the league was merged into a single division. The club spent two more seasons in the Landesliga before returning to the Niedersachsenliga in 2012.

In 2012–13 the club finished runners-up in the league and qualified for the promotion round to the Regionalliga Nord. Finishing third in its group, it missed out on promotion and stayed in the Niedersachsenliga, where it came third the season after and seventh in 2014–15. In the 2015–16 season the club won the Niedersachsenliga and earned promotion to the Regionalliga Nord. After an immediate relegation in 2016–17, it won the Niedersachsenliga again the following season to return to the Regionalliga Nord, but was relegated again in 2019.

== Honours ==
The club's honours:

- Niedersachsenliga
  - Champions: 2015–16, 2017–18
  - Runners-up: 2012–13
- Landesliga Braunschweig
  - Champions: 2011–12
  - Runners-up: 2008–09

== Recent seasons ==
The recent season-by-season performance of the club:

Season	Division	Tier	Position
2003–04	Bezirksliga Nord	VII	12th
2004–05	Bezirksliga Nord	VII	1st ↑
2005–06	Landesliga Braunschweig	VI	12th
2006–07	Bezirksoberliga Braunschweig	VI	3rd
2007–08	Bezirksoberliga Braunschweig	VI	9th
2008–09	Bezirksoberliga Braunschweig	VI	2nd ↑
2009–10	Oberliga Niedersachsen Ost	V	10th ↓
2010–11	Landesliga Braunschweig	VI	6th
2011–12	Landesliga Braunschweig	VI	1st ↑
2012–13	Niedersachsenliga	V	2nd
2013–14	Niedersachsenliga	V	3rd
2014–15	Niedersachsenliga	V	7th
2015–16	Niedersachsenliga	V	1st ↑
2016–17	Regionalliga Nord	IV	17th ↓
2017–18	Niedersachsenliga	V	1st ↑
2018–19	Regionalliga Nord	IV	18th ↓

- With the introduction of the Regionalligas in 1994 and the 3. Liga in 2008 as the new third tier, below the 2. Bundesliga, all leagues below dropped one tier.

↑ Promoted	↓ Relegated
