= August Hermann =

German teacher

- Born: Friedrich August Wilhelm Theodor Hermann; 14 September 1835; Lehre, Duchy of Brunswick
- Died: 20 February 1906 (aged 70); Braunschweig, German Empire
- Education: Great School in Wolfenbüttel
- Occupations: Physical education and sport instructor, poet

Friedrich August Wilhelm Theodor Hermann (14 September 1835 – 20 February 1906) was a German physical education instructor. He, along with Konrad Koch, introduced the game of association football to Germany from England in 1874. He is known as the Braunschweig "Father of Physical Education." Hermann also wrote and published poetry in the Low German language.

== Early career ==
Hermann grew up in Lehre, near Braunschweig, and studied to become a teacher. While studying in Wolfenbüttel at the Great School he learned physical education and became an avid gymnast.

== Teaching and sports ==
He became a school teacher in Dresden and completed additional training as a gym instructor. He moved on to become a physical education teacher at several schools and became dedicated to the Braunschweig men gymnastics club. He also set up an exercise organization outside Braunschweig.

Hermann was a proponent of exercise and physical education and in 1862 he wrote "Über die Notwendigkeit der Leibesübungen (On the Necessity of Physical Exercise)" striving to win a popular social opinion of physical education. He began volunteering at Martino-Katharineum High School in 1864 and became a teacher in 1869. In 1874 after visiting a number of public schools in England, Hermann returned with a soccer ball. Along with Konrad Koch, he introduced and held the first soccer match in Germany. Soccer was then included in the physical education curriculum at Martino-Katharineum. Hermann instituted the weekly "sedan-competitions" which was an afternoon of games and sports. After 1878, all classes at the school were required to attend and participate. These include numerous sporting events, including cricket.

Hermann's son Ernst, who was studying in Boston, told him about the game of basketball and in 1896 he led the initial attempt at bringing the game of basketball to Germany. The first game of basketball in Germany was played in Braunschweig. It wasn't until a couple decades later that the game gained popularity. He invented a number of different sports and also set up gymnastic teacher training in Wolfenbüttel. All high school physical education in Braunschweig have been set up according to his plans. In 1887, he continued his ceaseless efforts he was named the Braunschweig physical education superintendent.

In addition to writing rule books, he also wrote several books.

== Awards and honors ==
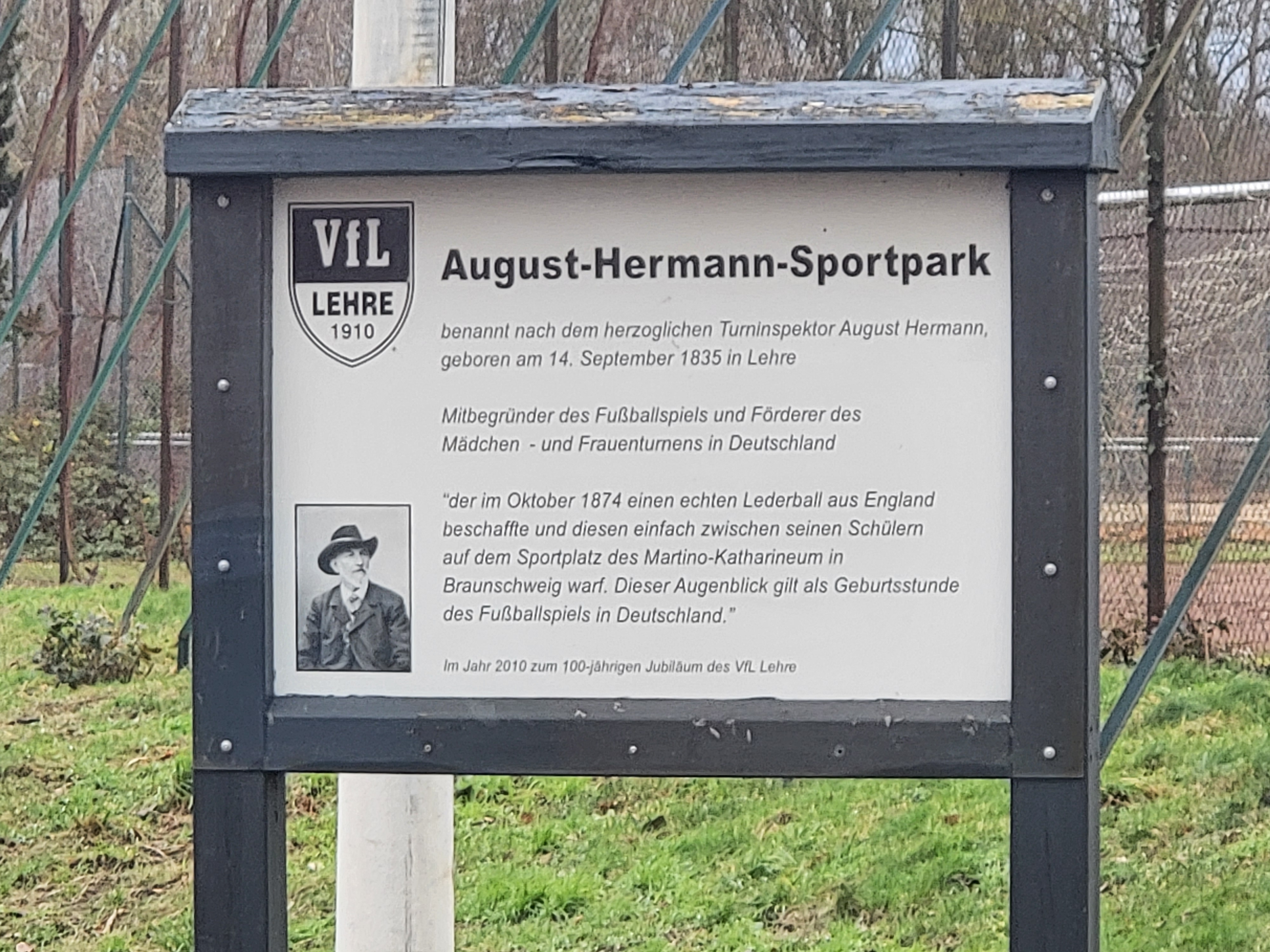
August Hermann Sports Park in Lehre

He is known as the "Father of Physical Education" in Braunschweig. His efforts won recognition beyond Braunschweig: He was chairman of the 'German Gymnastics Association' and belonged to the executive committee of the 'Central Committee on Public and Youth Games in Germany.' For his services to sports in Lower Saxony, he was inducted in 1988 into the Hall of Fame in the Lower Saxony Institute of Sport History.

== Selected works ==
- Ueber die Nothwendigkeit der Leibesübungen für die Jugend. Ein Wort an Aeltern und Freunde der Jugend für die Einführung des Turnunterrichts in die Schulen unseres Landes. Grüneberg, Braunschweig 1864.
- Erenst un Snack. En lüttjen Pack. Plattdeutsche Gedichte in niedersächsischer Mundart. Wagner, Braunschweig 1895.
- Fest im Takt. Leichte Tonstücke, Sing- und Tanzweisen zum Gebrauch beim Turnunterricht. Berlin 1895.
- Dei Mumme-Prowe. Limbach, Braunschweig 1898.
- Das Sedanfest in Braunschweig. Voigtländer, Leipzig 1899.
- Handbuch der Bewegungsspiele für Mädchen. Teubner, Leipzig 1905.

== See also ==
- Basketball in Germany
- Football in Germany
