= Heinz-Günter Scheil =

German footballer and manager

Personal information
- Full name: Heinz-Günter Scheil
- Date of birth: 9 November 1962 (age 63)
- Place of birth: Braunschweig, West Germany
- Height: 1.78 m (5 ft 10 in)
- Positions: Midfielder; defender

Team information
- Current team: SSV Kästorf (manager)

Youth career
- 1970–1978: TSV Vordorf
- 1978–1981: Eintracht Braunschweig

Senior career*
Years	Team	Apps	(Gls)
1981–1984	Eintracht Braunschweig Amateure		
1984–1993	Eintracht Braunschweig	229	(6)

Managerial career
- 1995: Eintracht Braunschweig (caretaker)
- 1995–1997: Eintracht Braunschweig (assistant)
- 1997–2000: Goslarer SC 08
- 2001–2003: MTV Gifhorn
- 2003–2004: Goslarer SC 08
- 2004–2007: BSV Ölper 2000
- 2007–2008: Eintracht Braunschweig (assistant)
- 2009–: SSV Kästorf
- * Club domestic league appearances and goals

Heinz-Günter Scheil (born 9 November 1962) is a retired German football player and current manager.

== Career ==
Scheil made his debut in the Bundesliga for Eintracht Braunschweig, where he spent his entire career, on 8 September 1984, in a game against SV Waldhof Mannheim. This should remain the only Bundesliga game of his career, as Braunschweig was relegated at the end of the season. Scheil continued to play for the club in the 2. Bundesliga, making 189 appearances at this level until he retired in 1993.

== Managing career ==
After retiring as a player, Scheil worked as assistant manager at Eintracht Braunschweig from 1995 until 1997, also taking over as caretaker manager for a time in 1995 after manager Jan Olsson had been sacked. Scheil went on to manage several local lower division sides during the next few years, until returning as assistant manager at Braunschweig for the 2007–08 season.

== Personal life ==
Heinz-Günter Scheil has a son, Dominik Scheil, who also played professionally for Eintracht Braunschweig.
