= Michael Scheike =

German footballer and manager

Personal information
- Full name: Michael Scheike
- Date of birth: 11 September 1963
- Place of birth: Braunschweig, West Germany
- Height: 1.77 m (5 ft 10 in)
- Position: Defender

Youth career
- 1974–1982: Eintracht Braunschweig

Senior career*
Years	Team	Apps	(Gls)
1983–1991	Eintracht Braunschweig	147	(6)
Total		147	(6)

International career
1984	West Germany U-21	2	(0)

Managerial career
- 2001: Rot-Weiss Essen (caretaker manager)
- 2005–2007: Leu Braunschweig (youth)
- 2007–2008: Hannoverscher SC (youth)
- 2011–: FC Braunschweig Süd
- * Club domestic league appearances and goals

Michael Scheike (born 11 September 1963) is a former German footballer and current manager.

== Career ==
As a player, he spent his entire career with Eintracht Braunschweig, including two seasons in the Bundesliga, as well as five seasons in the 2. Bundesliga. He was also capped twice for the West German U-21 national team. In 1991 an injury forced Scheike to retire from playing. Since then, he has been a manager, mostly in youth and amateur football. He has also managed Rot-Weiss Essen for a short time in 2001.
