= Michael Geiger (footballer) =

German footballer and manager (born 1960)

Personal information
- Full name: Michael Geiger
- Date of birth: 27 September 1960
- Place of birth: Heilbronn, West Germany
- Height: 1.79 m (5 ft 10 in)
- Position: Right-back

Youth career
- –1979: Union Böckingen

Senior career*
Years	Team	Apps	(Gls)
1979–1986	Eintracht Braunschweig	203	(22)
1986–1993	VfL Wolfsburg		

International career
- West Germany Youth
1981–1982	West Germany U-21	5	(0)

Managerial career
- 1993–1995: VfB Fallersleben
- 1995–1998: SSV Vorsfelde
- 1998–2005: VfB Fallersleben
- * Club domestic league appearances and goals

Michael Geiger (born 27 September 1960) is a former German footballer and current manager. As a player, he spent five seasons in the Bundesliga with Eintracht Braunschweig, as well as three seasons in the 2. Bundesliga with Braunschweig and VfL Wolfsburg.

Geiger was never capped by the senior Germany national team, but at one point he was the country's most ever capped player at the youth level, having played through all age groups up to the West German U-21.

== Honours ==
- UEFA European Under-21 Football Championship runner-up: 1982
