= Wolfgang Matz =

German footballer (1944–1995)

Personal information
- Full name: Wolfgang Matz
- Date of birth: 15 April 1944
- Place of birth: Salzgitter, Germany
- Date of death: 22 November 1995 (aged 51)
- Position: Defender

Youth career
- –1965: SV Union Salzgitter

Senior career*
Years	Team	Apps	(Gls)
1965–1967	Eintracht Braunschweig	16	(0)
1967–1968	Fortuna Düsseldorf	13	(2)
1968–1976	VfL Wolfsburg		
- * Club domestic league appearances and goals

Wolfgang Matz (born 15 April 1944 – 22 November 1995) was a German football player. He spent two seasons in the Bundesliga with Eintracht Braunschweig.

== Honours ==
- Bundesliga champion: 1966–67
