= Friedhelm Haebermann =

German footballer and manager

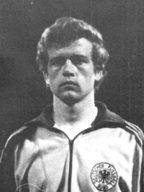
- Haebermann in 1971.

Personal information
- Full name: Friedhelm Haebermann
- Date of birth: 24 July 1946 (age 80)
- Place of birth: Duisburg, Allied-occupied Germany
- Height: 1.80 m (5 ft 11 in)
- Position: Sweeper

Youth career
- 1956–1964: VfvB Ruhrort/Laar
- 1964–1968: Eintracht Duisburg 1848

Senior career*
Years	Team	Apps	(Gls)
1968–1969	Eintracht Duisburg 1848	32	(1)
1969–1978	Eintracht Braunschweig	272	(10)
Total		304	(11)

International career
1969–1972	West Germany Amateur	37	(?)

Managerial career
- 2001: Tennis Borussia Berlin
- 2002–2003: SV Yeşilyurt
- * Club domestic league appearances and goals

Friedhelm Haebermann (born 24 July 1946 in Duisburg) is a former German football player and manager.

Haebermann made a total of 229 appearances for Eintracht Braunschweig in the Bundesliga during his playing career. He also represented West Germany at the 1972 Summer Olympics.
