= Guido Naumann =

German footballer

Personal information
- Date of birth: 14 April 1968 (age 58)
- Height: 1.80 m (5 ft 11 in)
- Position: Midfielder

Senior career*
| Years | Team | Apps | (Gls) |
| 1985–1986 | FC Schalke 04 | | |
| 1986–1988 | SG Wattenscheid 09 | | |
| 1988 | SV Darmstadt 98 | | |
| 1988–1990 | Eintracht Braunschweig | | |
| 1991–1993 | BSV Stahl Brandenburg | | |
| 1993–1994 | Alemannia Aachen | | |
| 1994–1995 | VfL Gevelsberg | | |
| 1999–2000 | SF Oestrich-Iserlohn | | |
| 2000–2001 | STV Horst Emscher | | |

Managerial career
- 2006: Germania Gladbeck (assistant)
- 2006–2007: Germania Gladbeck
- * Club domestic league appearances and goals

Guido Naumann (born 14 April 1968) is a retired German football midfielder.
