= Goran Radojević =

Serbian-German footballer

Personal information
- Date of birth: 9 November 1963 (age 62)
- Place of birth: SFR Yugoslavia
- Position: Forward

Senior career*
Years	Team	Apps	(Gls)
1981–1986	Radnički Kragujevac		
- Rad
1988	Spartak Subotica	16	(5)
1989–1990	NK Osijek	40	(10)
1990–1992	Sturm Graz	49	(6)
1992–1993	Sportfreunde Siegen		
1993–1994	Eintracht Braunschweig	23	(6)
1994–1998	Wolfenbütteler SV	123	(58)
- Braunschweiger SV 22

Managerial career
- –2004: TSV Sickte (player-manager)
- Braunschweiger SC (youth)
- 2004: SV Broitzem (player-manager)
- 2009–2010: SV Broitzem (player-manager)
- 2010–2012: SSV Remlingen
- 2012–: Eintracht Braunschweig (youth)
- * Club domestic league appearances and goals

Goran Radojević (born 9 November 1963) is a Serbian retired footballer, who also holds German citizenship.

== Career ==
Radojević began his career at his hometown-club Radnički Kragujevac, before playing for Rad, Spartak Subotica, and NK Osijek in Yugoslavia. In 1990, he moved to Austria, where he spent two seasons with Sturm Graz in the Austrian Bundesliga. At the end of his career, he had stints in Germany with Sportfreunde Siegen and Eintracht Braunschweig.

== Post-retirement ==
After retiring as a player, Radojević has stayed in Germany, where he lives in the Braunschweig/Wolfenbüttel area and has managed several teams at the amateur and youth level.
