= Otto Bülte =

German footballer

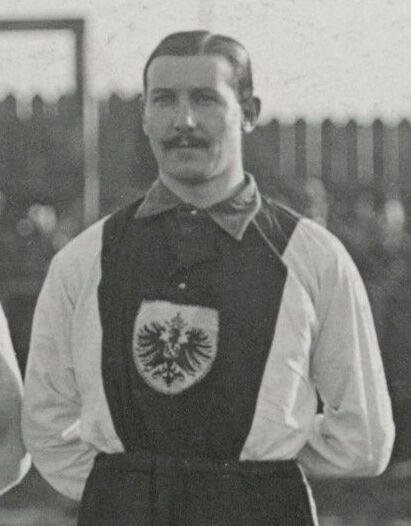
- Otto Bülte in 1910

Personal information
- Full name: Otto Bülte
- Date of birth: 4 September 1886
- Place of birth: Winnigstedt, Germany
- Date of death: Unknown
- Place of death: Unknown
- Position: Midfielder

Senior career*
Years	Team	Apps	(Gls)
1903–1911	Eintracht Braunschweig		
1911–1914	BFC Preussen		

International career
1910	Germany	1	(0)
- * Club domestic league appearances and goals

Otto Bülte (4 September 1886 – after 1914), (Note: He is sometimes referred to with the first name Konrad, though his real name is Otto.) nicknamed Otte, was a German footballer who played for Eintracht Braunschweig and BFC Preussen. He was also capped once for the Germany national team, in a friendly against the Netherlands.
