= Walter Poppe (footballer) =

German footballer (1886–1951)

Personal information
- Full name: Walter Poppe
- Date of birth: 5 March 1886
- Date of death: 24 June 1951 (aged 65)
- Position: Midfielder

Senior career*
Years	Team	Apps	(Gls)
1904–1912	Eintracht Braunschweig		
1912–1914	Hannover 96		

International career
1908	Germany	1	(0)
- * Club domestic league appearances and goals

Walter Poppe (5 March 1886 – 24 June 1951) was a German footballer who played for Eintracht Braunschweig and Hannover 96. He was also capped once for the Germany national team, in a friendly against England. He was Eintracht Braunschweig's first player to receive a cap.
