= Özkan Koçtürk =

Turkish-German footballer

Personal information
- Full name: Özkan Koçtürk
- Date of birth: 6 November 1974 (age 51)
- Place of birth: Braunschweig, West Germany
- Position: Forward

Youth career
- Wacker Braunschweig
- Victoria Braunschweig
- Viktoria Ölsburg

Senior career*
Years	Team	Apps	(Gls)
1992–1996	Eintracht Braunschweig	61	(19)
1996–1997	Bayer 04 Leverkusen	0	(0)
1996	→ Fenerbahçe (loan)	1	(0)
1996	→ Çanakkale Dardanelspor (loan)	11	(1)
1997	→ Eintracht Braunschweig (loan)	15	(5)
1997–2002	Altay S.K.	62	(12)
2003–2005	BSV Ölper 2000		

Managerial career
- –2010: SSV Didderse (assistant)
- * Club domestic league appearances and goals as of 27 May 2012

Özkan Koçtürk (born 6 November 1974 in Braunschweig, Germany) is a retired Turkish-German footballer. He spent one season in the 2. Bundesliga with Eintracht Braunschweig, as well as four seasons in the Turkish Süper Lig with Fenerbahçe, Çanakkale Dardanelspor, and Altay S.K.
