= Jan Spoelder =

German-born Dutch footballer (born 1973)

Personal information
- Date of birth: 14 March 1973 (age 53)
- Place of birth: Braunschweig, West Germany
- Height: 1.89 m (6 ft 2 in)
- Position: Goalkeeper

Youth career
- 1979–1992: MTV Hondelage

Senior career*
Years	Team	Apps	(Gls)
1992–2006	Eintracht Braunschweig II		
1995–2005	Eintracht Braunschweig	18	(0)

Managerial career
- 2006–2009: Eintracht Braunschweig II (assistant)
- 2009–: SV Brunsrode/Flechtorf
- * Club domestic league appearances and goals

Jan Spoelder (born 14 March 1973) is a German-born Dutch former football goalkeeper.

== Career ==
After playing youth and amateur football for Braunschweig-based club MTV Hondelage, Spoelder joined the reserve side of Eintracht Braunschweig in 1992. He was promoted to the club's first team in 1995 and went on to spend his entire professional career as back-up keeper at Eintracht Braunschweig, making 18 league appearances in ten seasons. His longest stint as starting keeper came during the 2002–03 2. Bundesliga season, when he played nine games in a row.
