= Hans-Georg Dulz =

German footballer (1936–2022)

Personal information
- Date of birth: 31 October 1936
- Place of birth: Germany
- Date of death: 16 February 2022 (aged 85)
- Place of death: Braunschweig, Lower Saxony, Germany
- Positions: Midfielder; forward

Senior career*
Years	Team	Apps	(Gls)
1954–1957	SV Dortmund 08		
1957–1959	Borussia Dortmund		
1959–1961	SSV Reutlingen		
1962–1963	Hamburger SV		
1963–1968	Eintracht Braunschweig	109	(15)
1968–1969	FC Aarau		
- * Club domestic league appearances and goals

Hans-Georg Dulz (31 October 1936 – 16 February 2022) was a German footballer who played as a midfielder or forward. He spent five seasons in the Bundesliga with Eintracht Braunschweig. Dulz died on 16 February 2022, at the age of 85.

== Honours ==
Eintracht Braunschweig

- Bundesliga: 1966–67
