= Wolf-Rüdiger Krause =

German footballer and coach (born 1944)

Personal information
- Full name: Wolf-Rüdiger Krause
- Date of birth: 7 September 1944 (age 82)
- Place of birth: Kolberg, Germany
- Position: Striker

Youth career
- –1963: RSV Braunschweig

Senior career*
Years	Team	Apps	(Gls)
1963–1966	Eintracht Braunschweig Amat.		
1965–1967	Eintracht Braunschweig	5	(1)
1967–1975	VfL Wolfsburg		

International career
1965–1966	West Germany Amateur	4	(2)

Managerial career
- 1976–1984: MTV Gifhorn
- 1984–1988: VfL Wolfsburg
- 1993–1994: Eintracht Braunschweig
- * Club domestic league appearances and goals

Wolf-Rüdiger Krause (born 7 September 1944) is a German football coach and a former player. As a player, he spent two seasons in the Bundesliga with Eintracht Braunschweig.

== Honours ==
- Bundesliga champion: 1966–67
