= Eberhard Haun =

German footballer

Personal information
- Full name: Eberhard Haun
- Date of birth: 1 October 1949
- Place of birth: Magdeburg, Soviet occupation zone in Germany
- Date of death: 8 August 1976 (aged 26)
- Place of death: Groß Brunsrode, West Germany
- Position: Midfielder

Senior career*
Years	Team	Apps	(Gls)
–1970	SV Arminia Hannover		
1970–1974	Eintracht Braunschweig	99	(3)

International career
1972–1973	West Germany U-23	2	(0)
1972	West Germany B	1	(1)
- * Club domestic league appearances and goals as of 30 April 2012

Eberhard Haun (1 October 1949 – 8 August 1976) was a German footballer. Haun, who spent three seasons in the Bundesliga with Eintracht Braunschweig, had to retire early from football in 1974 because of a knee injury and became an art student. He died just two years after his retirement in a car accident.
