= Dominik Scheil =

German footballer

Personal information
- Full name: Dominik Scheil
- Date of birth: 12 December 1989 (age 36)
- Place of birth: Braunschweig, West Germany
- Height: 1.83 m (6 ft 0 in)
- Position: Defender

Team information
- Current team: TSV Vordorf
- Number: 16

Youth career
- TSV Vordorf
- MTV Gifhorn
- –2005: VfL Wolfsburg
- 2005–2008: Eintracht Braunschweig

Senior career*
Years	Team	Apps	(Gls)
2007–2009	Eintracht Braunschweig II	31	(1)
2008	Eintracht Braunschweig	1	(0)
2009–2014	SSV Kästorf		
2014–2015	FC Braunschweig		
2015–	TSV Vordorf		
- * Club domestic league appearances and goals as of 04:43, 15 October 2018 (UTC)

Dominik Scheil (born 12 December 1989) is a German footballer who plays as a defender for TSV Vordorf.

== Career ==
Scheil made his professional debut for Eintracht Braunschweig in the 3. Liga on 5 October 2008, coming on as a substitute in the 90+1st minute for Fait-Florian Banser in the 1–1 away draw against Dynamo Dresden.

== Personal life ==
Scheil's father Heinz-Günter is a former football and manager, having also played professionally for Eintracht Braunschweig.
