= Joachim Bäse =

German footballer (1939–2020)

Personal information
- Date of birth: 2 September 1939
- Place of birth: Braunschweig, Germany
- Date of death: 22 December 2020 (aged 81)
- Place of death: Braunschweig
- Height: 1.87 m (6 ft 2 in)
- Positions: Midfielder; defender

Youth career
- FC Wenden

Senior career*
Years	Team	Apps	(Gls)
1959–1973	Eintracht Braunschweig	321	(31)

International career
1968	West Germany	1	(0)
- * Club domestic league appearances and goals

Joachim Bäse (2 September 1939 – 22 December 2020) was a German football player. He was born in Braunschweig. He spent ten seasons in the Bundesliga with Eintracht Braunschweig, starting with the league's foundation in 1963. In total, Bäse played 347 matches in all official competitions for Braunschweig, scoring 33 goals.

He also represented Germany once, in a friendly against Wales.

Bäse died on 22 December 2020, aged 81.

== Honours ==
- Bundesliga champion: 1966–67 (Bäse was team captain)
