= Bernd Franke =

German footballer (born 1948)

Personal information
- Date of birth: 12 February 1948 (age 78)
- Place of birth: Bliesen, Saar Protectorate
- Height: 1.83 m (6 ft 0 in)
- Position: Goalkeeper

Youth career
- –1966: SV Bliesen
- 1966–1967: SV Urexweiler

Senior career*
Years	Team	Apps	(Gls)
1967–1969	Saar 05 Saarbrücken	35	(0)
1969–1971	Fortuna Düsseldorf	29	(0)
1971–1985	Eintracht Braunschweig	387	(0)
Total		451	(0)

International career
1972–1977	West Germany B	6	(0)
1973–1982	West Germany	7	(0)
1982–1984	West Germany Olympic	12	(0)
- * Club domestic league appearances and goals

Bernd Franke (born 12 February 1948) is a German former footballer who played as a goalkeeper.

== Club career ==
Also an outfield player in his youth, young Bernd Franke made his steps towards the professional game following his impressiveness in the ranks of Saar 05 Saarbrücken. Their manager, Otto Knefler, remembered the young goalkeeper during his spell at Fortuna Düsseldorf and took him to Düsseldorf then. It was in 1971 when Knefler had been employed by Bundesliga side Eintracht Braunschweig and signed Franke again, this time considering decent backup's for Horst Wolter, Braunschweig's regular goalkeeper. Instantly Franke ousted the former international goalkeeper, but could not stop his club from getting relegated in 1973. Poised to join 1. FC Kaiserslautern from relegated Braunschweig that summer, Franke rejected the chance of staying a Bundesliga player in the year before the 1974 FIFA World Cup. In 1974, he was back in the Bundesliga with Braunschweig, as reliable as usual, enjoying a third-place finish in 1977.

It was just days ahead of the 1978 FIFA World Cup when Franke finally started to fall prey to injuries, failing to report for first-team fixtures due to injuries in the remaining years of his career from time to time. A loyal servant for Eintracht Braunschweig, however, the respected keeper stayed on with the club for one more season outside the Bundesliga during 1980–81 and was, when free of injury, a regular for them until Braunschweig's latest relegation from the top tier of German football in 1985. That was the summer Bernd Franke retired in order to promote his career outside the game. In total he showed up in 345 Bundesliga matches for his sole professional club in between 1971 and 1985.

== International career ==
Raising eyebrows due to his games for Eintracht Braunschweig, Bernd Franke established himself as a backup choice for Sepp Maier and Wolfgang Kleff in the affairs of West Germany, debuting for his country on 28 March 1973, in a friendly. Friendlies remained his business, mainly in times when neither Maier nor Kleff were on show for Helmut Schön. His decision to stay on with his club after relegation in 1973 ruined Franke's hopes of getting a spot in the 1974 FIFA World Cup winning squad of West Germany. Schalke 04's Norbert Nigbur was named third choice by the West Germans then. Even more tragic for Franke was an injury he sustained in May 1978 in a meaningless friendly of the 1978 FIFA World Cup squad, for which he had been called up, against a local amateur selection in Frankfurt. The injury forced him to withdraw from the squad, letting him miss out on a World Cup participation for a second time in a row. Therefore, Franke was delighted after he had definitely made it into the final squad of his nation for the 1982 FIFA World Cup, despite not showing up a single time in that competition. Weeks before that tournament he had enjoyed his final two of altogether seven caps, playing in friendly victories against Portugal and Norway. Already out of contention for Die Nationalmannschaft, Franke was given the chance to represent West Germany as starting keeper in all of their four matches in the football competition at the 1984 Summer Olympics. Throughout his career Franke was considered by many to have been the equal of both Sepp Maier and Harald Schumacher but was never able to move that one step further up and make himself first choice for West Germany, had he not suffered unfortunate injuries at the worst possible moments he may have taken over from Sepp Maier towards the end of the 1970s.
