= Albert Sukop =

German footballer

Personal information
- Full name: Albert Sukop
- Date of birth: 24 November 1912
- Place of birth: Klein Lafferde, Germany
- Date of death: 9 May 1993 (aged 80)
- Position: Midfielder

Youth career
- 1924–1930: Eintracht Braunschweig

Senior career*
Years	Team	Apps	(Gls)
1930–1948	Eintracht Braunschweig		

International career
1935	Germany	1	(0)
- * Club domestic league appearances and goals

Albert Sukop (24 November 1912 – 9 May 1993) was a German footballer who played for Eintracht Braunschweig. He started his career with the youth team of Eintracht Braunschweig in 1924 and stayed with the club until his retirement in 1948.

Sukop was also capped once for the Germany national team, in a friendly against Estonia.
