= Wolfgang Brase =

German footballer (1939–2026)

Personal information
- Date of birth: 7 February 1939
- Place of birth: Braunschweig, Germany
- Date of death: 14 July 2026 (aged 87)
- Place of death: Braunschweig, Germany
- Position: Defender

Youth career
- 1946–1958: Eintracht Braunschweig

Senior career*
Years	Team	Apps	(Gls)
1958–1968	Eintracht Braunschweig	177	(3)
Total		177	(3)

Managerial career
- TSV Schapen
- SV Gifhorn
- TSV Helmstedt
- * Club domestic league appearances and goals

Wolfgang Brase (7 February 1939 – 14 July 2026) was a German footballer who played as a defender. He spent his entire career with Eintracht Braunschweig.

== Club career ==
Brase joined the youth academy of Eintracht Braunschweig in 1946 at seven years old and spent his entire footballing career with his hometown club. He was promoted to the club's Oberliga Nord senior squad in 1958. Initially starting his career as a forward, he later transitioned into a right-sided defender and center-back, becoming feared by opponents for his exceptional pace.

He earned the local nickname "Schnippel" due to his signature technical ability to curl precise crosses into the penalty area using both the inside and outside of his right foot—a style of play that predated the famous "banana crosses" later popularized in German football. In total, Brase made nearly 300 competitive appearances for the club, including 97 matches in the top-flight Bundesliga after its foundation in 1963.

During Braunschweig's title-winning 1966–67 Bundesliga season, Brase's playing career was abruptly brought to a halt prior to the fourth matchday, due to a sudden and mysterious viral illness.

Brase officially retired from professional football in July 1968 at the age of 29.

== Personal life and death ==
Brase was a trained toolmaker and studied mechanical engineering while playing, before working in quality assurance at Volkswagen.

Brase died in Braunschweig on 14 July 2026, at the age of 87, following a long and severe illness. Eintracht Braunschweig released a statement in mourning, and noted that he had lived near the Eintracht-Stadion throughout his life.

== Honours ==
Eintracht Braunschweig

- Bundesliga: 1966–67
