= Klaus Meyer =

German footballer

Personal information
- Full name: Klaus Meyer
- Date of birth: 5 August 1937
- Place of birth: Braunschweig, Germany
- Date of death: 4 April 2014 (aged 76)
- Position: Defender

Senior career*
Years	Team	Apps	(Gls)
- VfL Oker
- MTV Gittelde
1958–1968	Eintracht Braunschweig	204	(3)
- * Club domestic league appearances and goals

Klaus Meyer (5 August 1937 – 4 April 2014) was a German football player. He spent ten seasons with Eintracht Braunschweig, including five in the Bundesliga, starting with the league's foundation in 1963. In total, Meyer played 212 matches in all official competitions for Braunschweig, scoring three goals.

Meyer died on 4 April 2014.

== Honours ==
- Bundesliga champion: 1966–67
