= Heinz Patzig =

German footballer (1929–2013)

Personal information
- Date of birth: 19 September 1929
- Place of birth: Chemnitz, Germany
- Date of death: 28 March 2013 (aged 83)
- Place of death: Braunschweig, Germany
- Position: Forward

Youth career
- PSV Chemnitz

Senior career*
| Years | Team | Apps | (Gls) |
| 1948–1950 | BSG Fewa Chemnitz | | |
| 1950–1954 | VfB Lübeck | 59 | (17) |
| 1954–1961 | Eintracht Braunschweig | 191 | (43) |

Managerial career
- 1963–1991: Eintracht Braunschweig (assistant)
- 1979: Eintracht Braunschweig (caretaker)
- 1983: Eintracht Braunschweig (caretaker)
- 1985: Eintracht Braunschweig (caretaker)
- 1986: Eintracht Braunschweig (caretaker)
- * Club domestic league appearances and goals

Heinz Patzig (19 September 1929 – 28 March 2013) was a German football player and manager.

== Playing career ==
Patzig was born in Chemnitz. Early in his career he played for Fewa Chemnitz (a predecessor club of Chemnitzer FC) in East Germany. In 1950 Patzig fled into West Germany and went on to play successfully for Oberliga Nord sides VfB Lübeck and Eintracht Braunschweig, until an injury forced him to retire in 1961.

== Coaching career ==
After his playing career, Patzig worked as Eintracht Braunschweig's assistant coach for 27 straight seasons, from 1963 to 1991, under managers such as Helmuth Johannsen, Otto Knefler, Branko Zebec, Uli Maslo, Aleksandar Ristić, and others. The biggest success during his time as an assistant came in 1967, when Eintracht won the Bundesliga. Four times Patzig took over as caretaker manager: in 1979, 1983, 1985, and 1986. In total, he was the team's head coach for 15 Bundesliga and 13 2. Bundesliga games.

== Death ==
Patzig died on 28 March 2013, at the age of 83.
