= 1976 Women's Hockey World Cup =

International field hockey competition

1976 Women's FIH Hockey World Cup
Tournament details
- City: West Berlin
- Dates: 21–30 May
- Teams: 11 (from 3 confederations)

Final positions
- Champions: West Germany (1st title)
- Runner-up: Argentina
- Third place: Netherlands

The 1976 Women's Hockey World Cup was the second edition of the Women's Hockey World Cup. It took place from 22 to 30 May in West Berlin. The 11 teams were divided into two pools, with five teams in Pool A and six in Pool B. West Germany, which remained undefeated throughout the tournament, won the title by defeating Argentina 2–0 in the final on 30 May.

== Preliminary round ==
=== Pool A ===
Pos	Team	Pld	W	D	L	GF	GA	GD	Pts	Qualification
1	Netherlands	4	4	0	0	23	3	+20	8	Semi-finals
2	Belgium	4	3	0	1	14	4	+10	6	Semi-finals
3	Mexico	4	1	1	2	2	12	−10	3	
4	Switzerland	4	0	2	2	2	11	−9	2	
5	Italy	4	0	1	3	1	12	−11	1	

Source: FIH, Times

21 May 1976

Netherlands	8–0	Mexico
	Report

21 May 1976

Belgium	5–0	Italy
	Report

22 May 1976

Netherlands	4–3	Belgium
	Report

22 May 1976

Italy	1–1	Switzerland
	Report

24 May 1976

Switzerland	0–6	Netherlands
	Report

24 May 1976

Belgium	3–0	Mexico
	Report

25 May 1976

Italy	0–5	Netherlands
	Report

25 May 1976

Mexico	1–1	Switzerland
	Report

27 May 1976

Switzerland	0–3	Belgium
	Report

27 May 1976

Mexico	1–0	Italy
	Report

=== Pool B ===
Pos	Team	Pld	W	D	L	GF	GA	GD	Pts	Qualification
1	West Germany	5	5	0	0	21	1	+20	10	Semi-finals
2	Argentina	5	4	0	1	18	3	+15	8	Semi-finals
3	France	5	3	0	2	13	6	+7	6	
4	Spain	5	2	0	3	7	12	−5	4	
5	Austria	5	1	0	4	3	10	−7	2	
6	Nigeria	5	0	0	5	0	30	−30	0	

Source: FIH, Times

21 May 1976

West Germany	3–1	Argentina
	Report

21 May 1976

Spain	5–0	Nigeria
	Report

21 May 1976

Austria	1–4	France
	Report

22 May 1976

Nigeria	0–9	West Germany
	Report

22 May 1976

Argentina	3–0	Austria
	Report

22 May 1976

France	3–0	Spain
	Report

24 May 1976

West Germany	5–0	Spain
	Report

24 May 1976

Argentina	2–0	France
	Report

24 May 1976

Austria	2–0	Nigeria
	Report

25 May 1976

West Germany	1–0	Austria
	Report

25 May 1976

Argentina	4–0	Spain
	Report

25 May 1976

France	6–0	Nigeria
	Report

27 May 1976

Spain	2–0	Austria
	Report

27 May 1976

Nigeria	0–8	Argentina
	Report

27 May 1976

France	0–3	West Germany
	Report

== Classification round ==
=== Ninth to eleventh place classification ===
==== Bracket ====
Crossover
30 May 1976
Italy (pen.)	1 (3)
Nigeria	1 (2)

Ninth Place
28 May 1976
Austria	1
Italy	0

==== Crossover ====
28 May 1976

Italy	1–1	Nigeria
	Report
Penalties
	3–2

==== Ninth and tenth place ====
30 May 1976

Austria	1–0	Italy
	Report

=== Fifth to eighth place classification ===
==== Bracket ====
Crossover
28 May 1976
Mexico	1
Spain	3
28 May 1976
France	1
Switzerland	0

Fifth Place
30 May 1976
Spain	3
France	0
Seventh Place
30 May 1976
Mexico	1
Switzerland	0

==== Crossover ====
28 May 1976

Mexico	1–3	Spain
	Report

28 May 1976

France	1–0	Switzerland
	Report

==== Seventh and eighth place ====
30 May 1976

Mexico	1–0	Switzerland
	Report

==== Fifth and sixth place ====
30 May 1976

Spain	3–0	France
	Report

== Medal round ==
=== Bracket ===
Semi-finals
28 May 1976
Netherlands	0 (3)
Argentina (pen.)	0 (4)
28 May 1976
West Germany	3
Belgium	1

Final
30 May 1976
Argentina	0
West Germany	2
Third place
30 May 1976
Netherlands	1
Belgium	0

=== Semi-finals ===
28 May 1976

West Germany	3–1	Belgium
Klimpel 6', 45'; Scholz 70'	Report	Boisset 40'

28 May 1976

Netherlands	0–0	Argentina
	Report
Penalties
	3–4

=== Third and fourth place ===
30 May 1976

Netherlands	1–0	Belgium
	Report

=== Final ===
30 May 1976

Argentina	0–2	West Germany
	Report

1976 Women's Hockey World Cup winner

West Germany
First title

== Winning Squad ==
West Germany

- Gabriele Appel
- Christl Behr
- Ingrid Bruckert
- Steffi Drescher
- Evi Eckert
- Birgit Hagen
- Birgit Hahn
- Uschi Keimer
- Heidemarie Kilmpel
- Christel Lau
- Margit Muller
- Gudrun Neumann
- Gudrun Scholz
- Elisabeth von Ladiges
- Birgitte Welzel
