= Otto Knefler =

German footballer and manager (1923–1986)

Personal information
- Date of birth: September 5, 1923
- Place of birth: Bernburg, Germany
- Date of death: 30 October 1986 (aged 63)
- Place of death: Steinbach, West Germany

Managerial career
- Years: Team
- 1963–1966: SV Saar 05 Saarbrücken
- 1967–1968: 1. FC Kaiserslautern
- 1968–1970: Fortuna Düsseldorf
- 1970–1974: Eintracht Braunschweig
- 1974–1976: Borussia Dortmund
- 1976–1978: MSV Duisburg
- 1978: Eintracht Frankfurt

Otto Knefler (5 September 1923 – 30 October 1986) was a German association football player and manager.

As player he won the championship of the German Democratic Republic of 1952 with Turbine Halle, today known as Hallescher FC. Between 1963 until his retirement in December 1973 he coached in the German Bundesliga and second division. Major successes were the promotions to the Bundesliga attained with Eintracht Braunschweig and Borussia Dortmund, albeit with the latter he was dismissed before the end of the season. Notably, they were placed fourth in the Bundesliga with Braunschweig in 1971 and placed sixth with MSV Duisburg in 1978, which was the second-best placing ever for the club.

== Career ==
In 1963 he commenced his coaching career with SV Saar 05 Saarbrücken in the southwest division of the second division, the Regionalliga Südwest In his three seasons there he kept the club between ranks four and six.

His first Bundesliga engagement with 1. FC Kaiserslautern followed 1967–68. There he was successor of the Hungarian Gyula Lóránt. He was terminated prematurely in early March 1968 after 24 matchdays when the club was just one point above a relegation rank. The last win then dated back to matchday eight. He was succeeded by Egon Piechaczek who in turn was replaced by Dietrich Weise before the end of the following season. Weise was hired by Knefler as his assistant, coming from the amateur side Neckarsulmer Sport-Union. Amongst his players in Kaiserslautern were the later coaches Uwe Klimaschefski and Otto Rehhagel.

From 1968 to 1970 he coached in the second division Regionalliga West Fortuna Düsseldorf. There he was succeeded by Heinz Lucas, who took the side in 1971 into the Bundesliga.

In 1970, he succeeded at Eintracht Braunschweig the retiring Helmuth Johannsen, who led the provincial side to the German championship of 1967. In his first year, he took the Eintracht to a surprise fourth place in the Bundesliga. The year thereafter the club finished 12th.

During his time in Braunschweig he was targeted by a phone call of the president of the Bundesliga club Rot-Weiß Oberhausen, Peter Maaßen who offered a bribe for a win against Braunschweig. Knefler rejected: "If you want to win, you better play well." While Knefler refused, some of his teammates, such as Lothar Ulsaß, Horst Wolter, and Wolfgang Grzyb, accepted bribes and were later punished in the wake of the so-called Bundesliga scandal.

Weakened by the loss of their most important players Eintracht Braunschweig finished 1972–73 as 17th of 18 clubs and was relegated. Braunschweig retained Knefler all the same and he succeeded in immediately returning the club to the Bundesliga.

Knefler thereafter was replaced with Branko Zebec and moved on to then second division club Borussia Dortmund finishing the season sixth. 1975–76 he was replaced after matchday 21 with Horst Buhtz. The club was then in fourth position and finished the season in second place, gaining promotion after two wins in a decider against 1. FC Nürnberg, the second of the southern group of the second division. Generally, he is credited that in his time with the club the team developed to a credible contestant for promotion. With a team of unfancied players he reached the semifinal of the German Cup in 1975, there only losing 1–2 away after extra time to MSV Duisburg - which lost the final 0–1 to Eintracht Frankfurt, coached by Knefler's former assistant Dietrich Weise. The team often attracted large crowds of around 40,000 spectators, more than many Bundesliga sides could expect. His time at the club which was relegated in 1972, was marred by internal jealousies, that presumably were a major factor behind his premature demise in the end of January 1976.

Mid 1976 he was hired by MSV Duisburg and thus returned into the Bundesliga. With the Austrian playmaker Kurt Jara and the attackers Rudi Seliger and Ronnie Worm and the solid defence around Bernard Dietz and Detlef Pirsig the club finished ninth. Knefler retired for medical reasons - half of his stomach had to be removed - but returned from matchday 10 for six matches to the coaching bench in Duisburg. The team finished that season sixth, their best placing since coming second in 1964. Herbert Burdenski on matchday one and Rolf Schafstall coached before his return. Friedhelm Wenzlaff for one match and Carl-Heinz Rühl after him.

He commenced the season 1978–79 at the helm of Eintracht Frankfurt as successor of Dettmar Cramer. On the return from a Cup-match in Bremen on 23 September 1978 - where the Eintracht with players like Jürgen Grabowski, Bernd Hölzenbein and the Austrian Bruno Pezzey won 3–2 - Knefler sustained severe injuries in a car accident so that he had to abandon his career in December, after 16 league matches, the Eintracht then being sixth in the league. Initially Udo Klug and then Friedel Rausch led the club to a finish on the fifth spot.

Otto Knefler was an opponent of the offside-rule. "Football excites because it is simple. The offside rule makes it complicated and ponderous."
