= DJ Pari =

German-American DJ

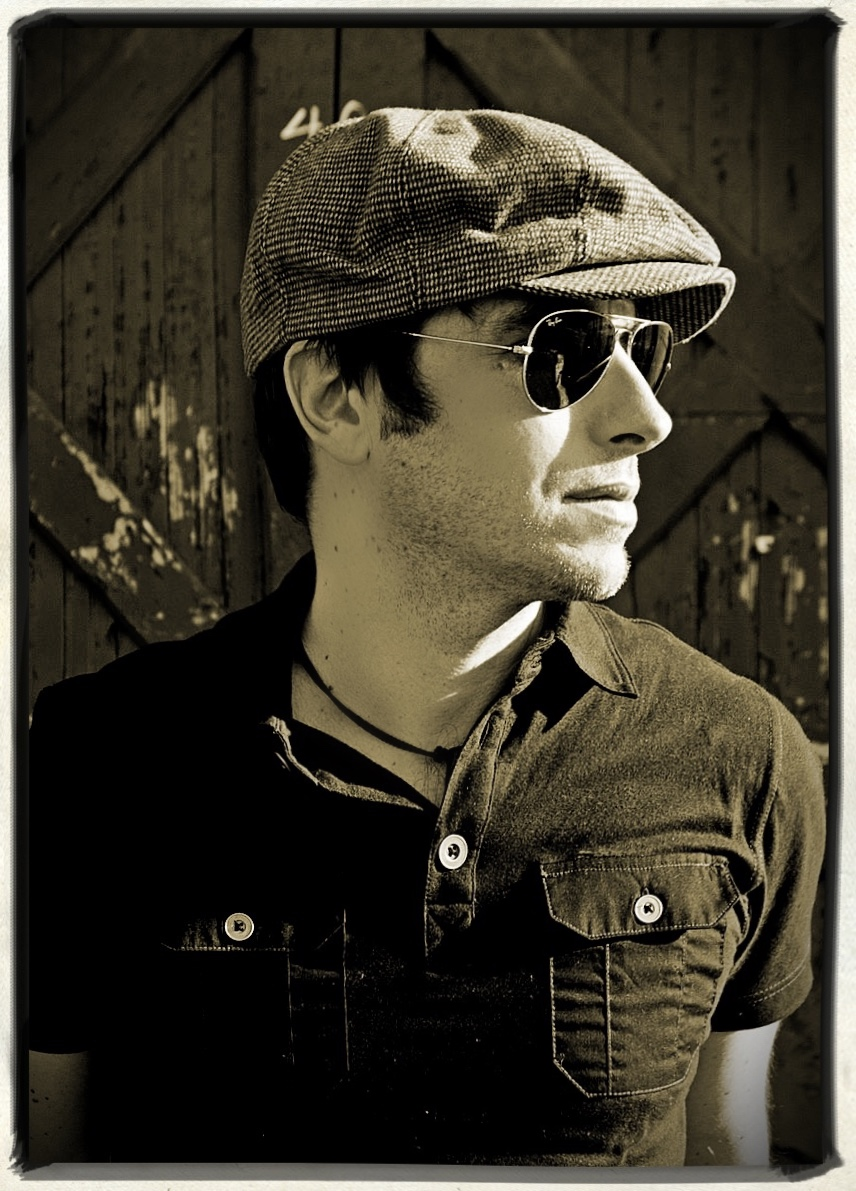
- DJ Pari in 2012

Background information
- Born: Braunschweig, Germany
- Genres: Funk; jazz; soul
- Occupation(s): DJ, journalist, producer, artist manager
- Years active: 1992–present
- Website: www.mixcloud.com/DJPariSoulpower/

DJ Pari, born Markus Schmidt, is a German-American DJ, producer and journalist. He is mostly known for his collaborations with Soul legends like Marva Whitney, Gwen McCrae, Lyn Collins, The Impressions and James Brown amongst others.

== Life ==
DJ Pari is the son of former professional footballer Walter Schmidt. Born in Braunschweig, Germany, he began DJing at age 15. In 1994, he moved to the United States, first to Phoenix, Arizona, where he spent two years running the club night The Hip Joint. In 1995 he relocated to Los Angeles, California, where he played the club circuit and worked with artists like the Solsonics, Mandrill (band), The Black Eyed Peas, Big Black, Roy Porter (drummer) and many others. Around the same time he opened for the Godfather of Soul James Brown and toured with him.

In 1998, DJ Pari moved back to Germany and launched his Soulpower organization at the Palo Palo club in Hannover, Germany. Originally a monthly soul party, Soulpower evolved into a global project and booking agency, producing more than 400 shows and parties in more than 20 countries and 50 cities on four continents. Artists that DJ Pari has worked with under the Soulpower banner include Marva Whitney, Gwen McCrae, Lyn Collins, Bobby Byrd, Maceo Parker, Fred Wesley, Vicki Anderson, Pee Wee Ellis, Roy Ayers, Bootsy Collins, Clyde Stubblefield, John "Jabo" Starks, Sharon Jones, Sweet Charles Sherrell, Karl Denson, and RAMP.

As a producer, DJ Pari signs responsible for I am what I am, the 2006 album by Marva Whitney, and her singles "I am what I am" and "Soulsisters (of the world unite)" as well as Mama Feelgood by Lyn Collins and Live in Paris by Gwen McCrae. Pari has also worked with the Japanese funk group Osaka Monaurail, co-writing for and co-producing several albums.

Since his move to Richmond, Virginia in 2007, DJ Pari has collaborated with funk pioneer Sir Joe Quarterman and Chicago soul legend Leroy Hutson, managing the singer's 2010 European tour. Around the same time he assumed management duties for The Impressions of Curtis Mayfield fame, producing several tours in the United States, Europe and Japan for the group. In July 2012, he DJed with the Impressions at the Curtis Mayfield 70th Birthday Tribute at Lincoln Center in New York, a show that also featured Mavis Staples, William Bell, the Roots and other soul legends. DJ Pari also introduced the Impressions to Binky Griptite, guitarist and MC of Sharon Jones & The Dap-Kings, a relationship that produced the group's first single in more than 30 years. In 2016, he arranged a meeting of the Impressions with President Barack Obama at the White House.

In Richmond, DJ Pari was the co-host of the Soulpower party series and of the weekly radio show Midnight Soulstice on WRIR-LP.

In 2013, the film documentary Power of Soul, produced by DJ Pari, screened at the Cannes Film Festival and at several festivals and theaters in Germany. The documentary features original footage and Pari's interviews with artists like James Brown, Bobby Byrd, Vicki Anderson, Marva Whitney, The Pharcyde, Kurtis Blow, George McCrae among others.

In 2017, Marva Whitney's "I am what I am," co-written and produced by DJ Pari, was licensed by Ford for the TV commercial promoting the 2017 Ford Explorer titled "For Those With Their Own Path". Also in 2017, DJ Pari co-produced the album Tribute to my Soul Sisters by former James Brown backing vocalist Martha High with Osaka Monaurail.

DJ Pari is currently working as a journalist, under his real name, and editor in Richmond.

== Discography (as producer or co-producer) ==
=== Albums ===
- Soulpower - The Best of Year One (Soulpower Records, 2005)
- Gwen McCrae - Live in Paris (Hi&Fly, 2005)
- Lyn Collins - Mama Feelgood (Hi&Fly, 2006)
- Marva Whitney - I am what I am (Shout!, 2006)
- Marva Whitney - Marva Whitney with her own Osaka Monaurail - Live in Japan (Shout!, 2006)
- Undercover Express - Introducing Undercover Express (P-Vine, 2007)
- Osaka Monaurail - Amen, Brother! (Unique, 2007)
- Osaka Monaurail - Live in Spain (Shout!, 2009)
- Osaka Monaurail - State Of The World (Unique, 2011)
- DJ Pari - What It Is? (Soulpower, 2012)
- Osaka Monaurail - Osaka Monaurail Performs Riptide and Other Readings from the Book of Funk (Unique, 2014)
- Martha High - Tribute to My Soul Sisters (Recordkicks, 2018)

=== Singles ===
- Marva Whitney - I am what I am P. 1 / I am what I am P. 2 (Shout!, 2006)
- Marva Whitney - Soulsisters (Of the World Unite / It's her Thing (Shout!, 2006)
- Marva Whitney - I am what I am / Give it Up Turnit A Loose (12") (Freestyle, 2007)
- Osaka Monaurail - Signed, Sealed, Delivered I'm Yours / Supershine #9 (Our Label Records, 2008)
- Osaka Monaurail - Hung Up (vocal) / Hung Up (instr.) (Unique, 2009)
- Osaka Monaurail - Tighten Up / Soulful Strut (Unique, 2009)
- Osaka Monaurail - No Trouble on the Mountain (feat. Shirley Davis / The Archipelago (Unique, 2011)
- Martha High - A Little Taste of Soul / Unwind Yourself (Record Kicks, 2018)

== Filmography ==
- Power of Soul (Marctropolis, 2013)
