= Marva Whitney =

American R&B and soul singer (1944–2012)

- Born: Marva Ann Manning; May 1, 1944; Kansas City, Kansas, U.S.
- Died: December 22, 2012 (aged 68) Kansas City, Kansas
- Genres: R&B, soul, funk
- Instrument: Vocals
- Years active: mid-1960s–2000s
- Labels: King, T-Neck, Forte

Marva Whitney (born Marva Ann Manning; May 1, 1944 – December 22, 2012) was an American funk singer commonly referred to by her honorary title, Soul Sister #1. Whitney was considered by many funk enthusiasts to be one of the "rawest" and "brassiest" music divas.

Her most famous song is a response to the Isley Brothers' hit "It's Your Thing" titled "It's My Thing". This was famously sampled in "Bring The Noise" by Public Enemy, off their album It Takes a Nation of Millions to Hold Us Back, as well as in "Fuck tha Police" by the N.W.A.

== Biography ==
=== Early life ===
Born in Kansas City, Kansas, her performing career started as early as three years old while touring with her family's gospel group, the Manning Gospel Singers. At the age of 16 she joined the Alma Whitney Singers and two years later she married Harry Olander Whitney with whom she had a daughter Sherrie Whitney. She began singing R&B music for the first time in 1963 at a Kansas City venue and studied music at college. Whilst working at a garment factory, she continued performing in nightclubs and at local talent competitions, and by the mid-1960s had joined local group Tommy (Gadson) & The Derbys as their lead singer. The group opened for many leading performers passing through Kansas City. In 1967, she left the group, and turned down offers to tour with Bobby Bland and Little Richard before joining the James Brown Revue as a featured vocalist. Her marriage to Harry Olander Whitney ended in divorce in 1965. Subsequently, she was married, albeit briefly to disc jockey Phil Wardell.

=== Career ===
Her first solo single, "Your Love Was Good To Me", was recorded for King Records in mid-1967, but was unsuccessful as were two follow-up singles. She toured Europe, Asia and Africa with James Brown with whom she was in a relationship, and in early 1968 he produced her fourth solo single, "Unwind Yourself", in a more funky style. Although the record was not a chart hit, it was later sampled numerous times, most recognisably by the 45 King on his 1987 track "The 900 Number", which was then sampled by DJ Chad Jackson on his 1990 hit single "Hear the Drummer (Get Wicked)" (UK number 3 in July 1990), by DJ Kool on his 1996 hit "Let Me Clear My Throat" (UK number 6 in March 1997), Sway on his 2009 track "Mercedes Benz" and Mac Miller on his 2011 track "Party on Fifth Ave."

Whitney's first chart hit came with "It's My Thing (You Can't Tell Me Who to Sock It To)," a response to The Isley Brothers' hit "It's Your Thing"; her record reached number 19 on the Billboard R&B chart and number 82 on the Billboard Hot 100 in 1969. She followed up with two smaller hits, "Things Got To Get Better (Get Together)" (R&B number 22) and "I Made A Mistake Because It's Only You Pt. 1" (R&B number 32), and also recorded songs like "I'm Tired, I'm Tired, I'm Tired (Things Better Change Before Its Too Late)", and "If You Don't Work (You Can't Eat)." After recording three albums - Unwind Yourself (1968), Live and Lowdown at the Apollo [actually live in Georgia] (1969) and It's My Thing (1969) - and about 13 singles with James Brown as producer and writer or co-writer, an exhausted Whitney left the Brown stable in 1969 (or 1970) and returned to Kansas City.

Clarence Cooper and Allan Bell took over her management and initially struggled to get Whitney into major venues. A trip to Chicago in 1970 and a visit to producer Floyd Smith resulted in a contract for the Isley Brothers' T-Neck label. After divorcing Phil Wardell, she married Ellis Taylor of Forte Records with whom she had a son (Ellis C. Taylor Jr) and recorded further singles for the label, including "Daddy Don't Know About Sugar Bear", her most successful post Brown single that was picked up for national distribution by Nashville's Excello records. She retired from recording for several years making only local appearances in Kansas City, returning to the studio in 1977 for a Forte single with her brother Melvin Manning. Their single, "(Get Ready for) the Changes" bw "All Alone I’ve Loved" was credited to Marva & Melvin (With The M-W-T Express). Melvin was previously in a Kansas group, Smoke that also included Larry Brown of Harold Melvin & the Blue Notes in the lineup.

Whitney divorced Taylor in 1977 and relocated to Los Angeles for the next fifteen years.

In the early 1980s, she briefly joined a group, Coffee, Cream & Sugar, formed by singer Alfred "Pico" Payne and Mary Lou Flesh. Later in the 1980s, she started to perform regularly with former James Brown band members such as Maceo Parker, Fred Wesley, Pee Wee Ellis, and Lyn Collins, as the JB Allstars. She returned to Kansas City as it became apparent that Funk music was essentially unfashionable and opportunities were sparse. She became a mentor to her son Ellis C. Taylor Jr. who went on to record on the Men In Black soundtrack as well as other Jazz, Rap and R&B releases. She later married for the fourth time a preacher and returned to her gospel roots.

In 2006, Whitney collaborated with German born DJ/collector/manager DJ Pari and Japanese funk orchestra Osaka Monaurail to produce a new single, "I Am What I Am". Osaka Monaurail style themselves on the James Brown sound and the single was produced in the fashion of an authentic release of the recordings she produced with Brown in 1969. Two successful tours of Japan and a full-length album release followed, also entitled "I Am What I Am". In 2007, 2008 and 2009, the tour was also brought to Europe where she maintained a cult following.

In December 2009, Whitney had a stroke on stage during a concert in Lorne, Australia, while performing with The Transatlantics at Falls Festival. The remaining dates of her tour were cancelled; after Whitney made a partial recovery she performed again in 2010. In December 2012, Whitney died from complications of pneumonia at her home. She was 68.

== Discography ==
=== Album discography ===
Title	Label and catalog no.	Year
I Sing Soul	King KSD1053	(Unissued)
It's My Thing	King KSD1062	October 1969
Live And Lowdown At The Apollo	King KSD1079	February 1970
I Am What I Am (with Osaka Monaurail)	Shout! SHOUT-201	December 2006

=== Single discography on King Records ===
No.	Title	Label and catalog no.	Month and Year
1	"Your Love Was Good For me" b/w "Saving My Love For My Baby"	FEDERAL F12545	June 1967
2	"If You Love Me" b/w "Your Love Was Good For Me"	KING K6124	September 1967
3	"Unwind Yourself" b/w "If You Love Me"	KING K6146	January 1968
4	"Your Love Was Good For Me" b/w "What Kind Of Man"	KING K6158	April 1968
5	"Things Got To Get Better (Get Together)" b/w "What Kind Of Man"	KING K6168	May 1968
6	"I'll Work It Out" b/w "All My Love Belongs to You"	KING K6181	August 1968
7	"I'm Tired, I'm Tired, I'm Tired (Things Better Change Before It's Too Late)" b/w "If You Love Me"	KING K6193	September 1968
8	"What Do I Have To Do To Prove My Love To You" b/w "Your Love Was Good For Me"	KING K6202	November 1968
9	"Tit For Tat (Ain't No Taking Back)" b/w "In The Middle, Part 2 (Inst.)"	KING K6206	November 1968
10	"You Got To Have A Job (If You Don't Work – You Can't Eat)" (duet with James Brown) b/w "I'm Tired, I'm Tired, I'm Tired (Things Better Change Before It's Too Late)"	KING K6218	March 1969
11	"It's My Thing (You Can't Tell Me Who To Sock It To)" b/w "Ball Of Fire"	KING K6229	June 1969
12	"Things Got To Get Better (Get Together)" b/w "Get Out Of My Life"	KING K6249	August 1969
13	"I Made A Mistake Because It's Only You," Parts 1&2	KING K6268	September 1969
14	"He's The One" b/w This Girls In Love With You	KING K6283	January 1970

=== Single discography after King Records ===
No.	Title	Label and catalog no.	Month and Year
1	"This Is My Quest" b/w "Giving Up On Love"	T-Neck TN922	1970
2	"Live And Let Live" b/w "Don't Let Our Love Fade Away"	EXCELLO EX2328	1972
3	"Daddy Don't Know About Sugar Bear" b/w "We Need More (But Somebody Gotta Sacrifice)"	FORTE F11-14	1972
4	"I'd Rather Be (Nothing But Your Weakness)" b/w "(Hey, You And You And You And You) I've Lived The Life" as M-W-T EXPRESS featuring MARVA W. TAYLOR	FORTE 11151	1975
5	"I Am What I Am" Parts 1&2	RD Records RDBV025	June 2006
6	"Soulsisters (Of The World Unite)" b/w "It's Her Thing"	SHOUT! SHOUT-1001	Mar 2007
