= Franz Merkhoffer =

German footballer

Personal information
- Date of birth: 29 November 1946 (age 79)
- Place of birth: Dettum, Germany
- Height: 1.79 m (5 ft 10 in)
- Position: Defender

Youth career
- 1956–1965: MTV Dettum
- 1965–1968: Hamburger SV

Senior career*
Years	Team	Apps	(Gls)
1968–1984	Eintracht Braunschweig	496	(29)

International career
1969	West Germany U-23	1	(0)
- * Club domestic league appearances and goals

Franz Merkhoffer (born 29 November 1946) is a retired German footballer. He is the record holder for most games played for Eintracht Braunschweig, where he spent his whole professional career.

== Career ==
After playing youth and amateur football for his hometown club MTV Dettum and Hamburger SV II, Merkhoffer joined Bundesliga side Eintracht Braunschweig in 1968. In Braunschweig he played 419 games in the Bundesliga between 1968 and 1983, becoming a mainstay in the club's defense for almost 16 years.

== Post-retirement ==
After retiring from football in 1984, Merkhoffer went into horse breeding.

== Personal life ==
Merkhoffer is father-in-law to American soccer player Jacob Thomas, who married Merkhoffer's daughter during his stay as a player at Eintracht Braunschweig.
