= Horst Rick =

American soccer player

Personal information
- Date of birth: December 19, 1936
- Date of death: July 14, 2012 (aged 75)
- Position: Defender

International career
Years	Team	Apps	(Gls)
1964	United States	1	(0)

Horst Rick (December 19, 1936 – July 14, 2012) was an American professional soccer player who played as a midfielder in the German American Soccer League and the International Soccer League. He also earned one cap with the United States national team.

== Professional career ==
Rick was with Fortuna Düsseldorf, Eintracht Braunschweig and SSV Reutlingen in the German Oberliga from 1958 through 1963. In 1964, Rick played for New York Hota of the German American Soccer League. He then spent the 1965 International Soccer League with the New Yorkers.

== National team ==
Rick earned his one cap with the national team in a 10–0 loss to England on 27 May 1964.
