= Heinz Lucas =

German footballer (1920–2016)

Personal information
- Date of birth: 10 August 1920
- Place of birth: Berlin, Germany
- Date of death: 18 July 2016 (aged 95)
- Place of death: Erkrath, Germany
- Height: 1.79 m (5 ft 10 in)
- Position: Defender

Youth career
- 1930–: CFC Hertha 06

Senior career*
Years	Team	Apps	(Gls)
- CFC Hertha 06
- Bayern Kitzingen
- TSG Ulm 1846
–1951	Würzburger FV 04		
1951–1953	Berliner SV 1892	22	(0)

Managerial career
- 1951–1953: CFC Hertha 06
- 1953–1956: SC Wacker 04 Berlin
- 1958–1962: VfR Neumünster
- 1962–1963: Hannover 96
- 1963–1968: VfB Lübeck
- 1968–1970: Darmstadt 98
- 1970–1975: Fortuna Düsseldorf
- 1975–1978: 106 Munich
- 1979: Eintracht Braunschweig
- 1980: Wuppertaler SV
- 1981: SpVgg Fürth
- * Club domestic league appearances and goals

Heinz Lucas (10 August 1920 – 18 July 2016) was a German football player and manager. He managed several clubs in the German Bundesliga – including Fortuna Düsseldorf, where he had the most successful stint of his career, reaching third place twice in the 1972–73 and 1973–74 seasons.

== Playing career ==
Heinz Lucas learned the football ABC in Berlin at CFC Hertha 06 in 1906. After the Second World War he was active as a player in southern Germany for a few years at the clubs Bayern Kitzingen, Ulm 1846 and FV Würzburg 04. In 1951 he returned to Berlin and played for two more years as a contract player with Berliner SV from 1892 and completed 22 games in the Stadtliga Berlin. At the same time, he began his coaching career at CFC Hertha 06 in 1951.

== Coaching career ==
From 1953 to 1956 Lucas coached the Berlin Oberliga club Wacker 04 Berlin. In 1955 he had successfully completed his training as a football coach. This was followed by two rounds at Minerva 93 Berlin before he worked as a coach from the 1958–59 round in the Oberliga Nord football league. The first station was VfR Neumünster, where he looked after the purple whites from the VfR stadium at Stadtpark for four rounds until 1962. In the last year of the old first-class upper league system, 1962–63, the football coach at Hannover 96 tried in vain to lead the "Reds" into the new Bundesliga from the 1963–64 season with an outstanding final round. From 1961 to 1964 he held the position of chairman in the Association Group North of the Association of German Football Instructors.

At the beginning of the new Bundesliga era and also the new league substructure through the regional leagues, 1963–64, he was initially without a contract. From 15 February 1964 he took over VfB Lübeck, which was fighting relegation in the North Regional Football League, and looked after the green-whites from the Lohmühle stadium until 1968. After that, his career path took him to southern Germany; he took over the 1968–69 round of Darmstadt 98 in the Regionalliga Süd. With the Lilien vom Stadion am Böllenfalltor, he was relegated to the Hessian amateur camp in 1970 but remained as a coach in the regional league after moving to Fortuna Düsseldorf. On 1 July 1970, he took over Fortuna Düsseldorf in the Regionalliga West and rose a year later with Fortuna to the Bundesliga. At Fortuna, led by President Bruno Recht, he succeeded Otto Knefler, who had finished fourth in the West in 1969 and 1970.

The time in Düsseldorf was the most successful in his coaching career. In the first year 1970–71, his Fortuna, VfL Bochum with coach Hermann Eppenhoff and Wuppertaler SV with coach Horst Buhtz fought an exciting three-way battle at the top of the table for entry into the Bundesliga promotion round. Bochum was level on points in front of the Lucas-Elf champions and the team from the Stadion am Zoo, the WSV, had to wait another year before the Bergische 1972 with 60:8 points in the league and 16:0 points in the promotion round perfect promotion to the Bundesliga could do. With the attackers Reiner Geye (34-25) and Dieter Herzog (34-13), Lucas had two trump cards for the offensive in the squad. In the promotion round, the competition from Neunkirchen, St. Pauli, Nuremberg and Wacker 04 Berlin had no chance. With the BL newcomer, Lucas managed to stay up in 1971–72 in 13th place. When Gerd Zewe and Wolfgang Seel also strengthened his team, he climbed to third place in the Bundesliga twice with Fortuna in 1973 and 1974. His work in Düsseldorf ended on 22 April 1975. On 18 April he said goodbye to Fortuna with a 2–0 home win against 1. FC Kaiserslautern, who was eighth with 32:24 points. In the evening Lucas, who was one of the few stars among the many Fortuna trainers, celebrated his departure together with the board and players in the Benrather Hof. In the same month, he took up his new post at 106 Munich from the southern division of the 2. Bundesliga, succeeding Max Merkel. In 1977 he also managed to get promoted to the Bundesliga with the "Lions" by beating Arminia Bielefeld in three playoffs (4–0; 4–0; 2–0). However, after relegation in 1977–78 did not succeed and the mission to get promoted was also unsuccessful, his coaching job in Munich ended on 31 December 1978. As coach of Eintracht Braunschweig (from 27 March 1979) he said goodbye on 8 October 1979 finally out of the Bundesliga. He then coached Wuppertaler SV (1 January 1980 – 30 April 1980) and SpVgg Greuther Fürth (1 March 1981 – 30 June 1981) in the 2nd Bundesliga.

== Personal life ==
Lucas was married to a sports teacher, with whom they lived in Mettmann until her death in 2002. From October 2009 he lived in the “Rosenhof” retirement home in Erkrath and died in July 2016 at the age of 95.
