= Eintracht Braunschweig =

German association football club from Braunschweig, Lower Saxony

- Full name: Braunschweiger Turn- und Sportverein Eintracht von 1895 e.V.
- Nickname: Die Löwen (The Lions)
- Founded: 15 December 1895; 130 years ago
- Ground: Eintracht-Stadion
- Capacity: 23,325
- President: Nicole Kumpis
- Head coach: Lars Kornetka
- League: 2. Bundesliga
- 2025–26: 2. Bundesliga, 15th of 18
- Website: eintracht.com
Home colours	Away colours

Braunschweiger Turn- und Sportverein Eintracht von 1895 e.V., commonly known as Eintracht Braunschweig (German pronunciation: [ˈaɪntʁaxt ˈbʁaʊnʃvaɪk]) or BTSV (IPA: [ˌbeː teː ʔɛs ˈfaʊ]), is a German football and sports club based in Braunschweig, Lower Saxony. They compete in the 2. Bundesliga, the second tier of the German football pyramid, and have played home games at the 24,406-capacity Eintracht-Stadion since 1923.

Established in 1895 as FuCC Eintracht 1895, the club was a founding member of the German Football Association (DFB) in 1900. They enjoyed regional success before World War II, winning the Northern German Championship in 1908 and 1913. After the war, Braunschweig re-established itself in the Oberliga Nord and was among the original 16 clubs admitted to the inaugural Bundesliga season in 1963. Their golden era came in the 1960s and 1970s, when they were crowned Bundesliga champions in 1966–67 under manager Helmut Johannsen and finished third in 1976–77.

Braunchschweig were a Bundesliga mainstay until their relegation in 1985, following which they have spent decades oscillating between the second and third tiers. The club survived a financial crisis and near-relegation to the fourth tier in the late 2000s. A dramatic resurgence under manager Torsten Lieberknecht saw their promotion to the Bundesliga in 2013 after a 28-year absence, though the return lasted just one season. In recent years, the club has remained a yo-yo side between the 2. Bundesliga and 3. Liga.

Nicknamed Die Löwen (“The Lions”) for the red lion on their crest, Braunschweig's traditional blue and yellow kit colours are derived from the flag of the Duchy of Brunswick.Their longest-standing and fiercest rivalry is with Hannover 96, against whom they contest the Lower Saxony derby.

== History ==
=== Foundation and early years ===
Eintracht Braunschweig was founded as the football and cricket club FuCC Eintracht 1895 in 1895, became FC Eintracht von 1895 in 1906, and then SV Eintracht in 1920.

The team has a colourful history and it quickly became one of northern Germany's favourite sides. In 1900, Eintracht Braunschweig was among the founding members of the German Football Association (DFB). It enjoyed success early on, playing in the upper-tier league, winning the Northern German championship in 1908 and 1913, and placing three players on the Germany national team by 1914. Under the Third Reich, the team played in the Gauliga Niedersachsen and managed two appearances in the national final rounds. According to a book about the Massaker von Prerau, the mass murderer Karol Pazúr played for Eintracht Braunschweig in 1940. In 1942–43, Eintracht Braunschweig went into the national championship play-offs as one of the favourites. The team under manager Georg "Schorsch" Knöpfle had just won the newly formed Gauliga Südhannover-Braunschweig with a record of 17 wins and 1 draw in 18 games, scoring 146 goals in the process. After a convincing 5–1 win over Victoria Hamburg in the first round, the draw saw the club paired with the other favourites for the title, Helmut Schön's Dresdner SC. Dresden won the game held in Dresden with 4–0, and subsequently won the German championship, with an undefeated season.

=== Post-war football ===
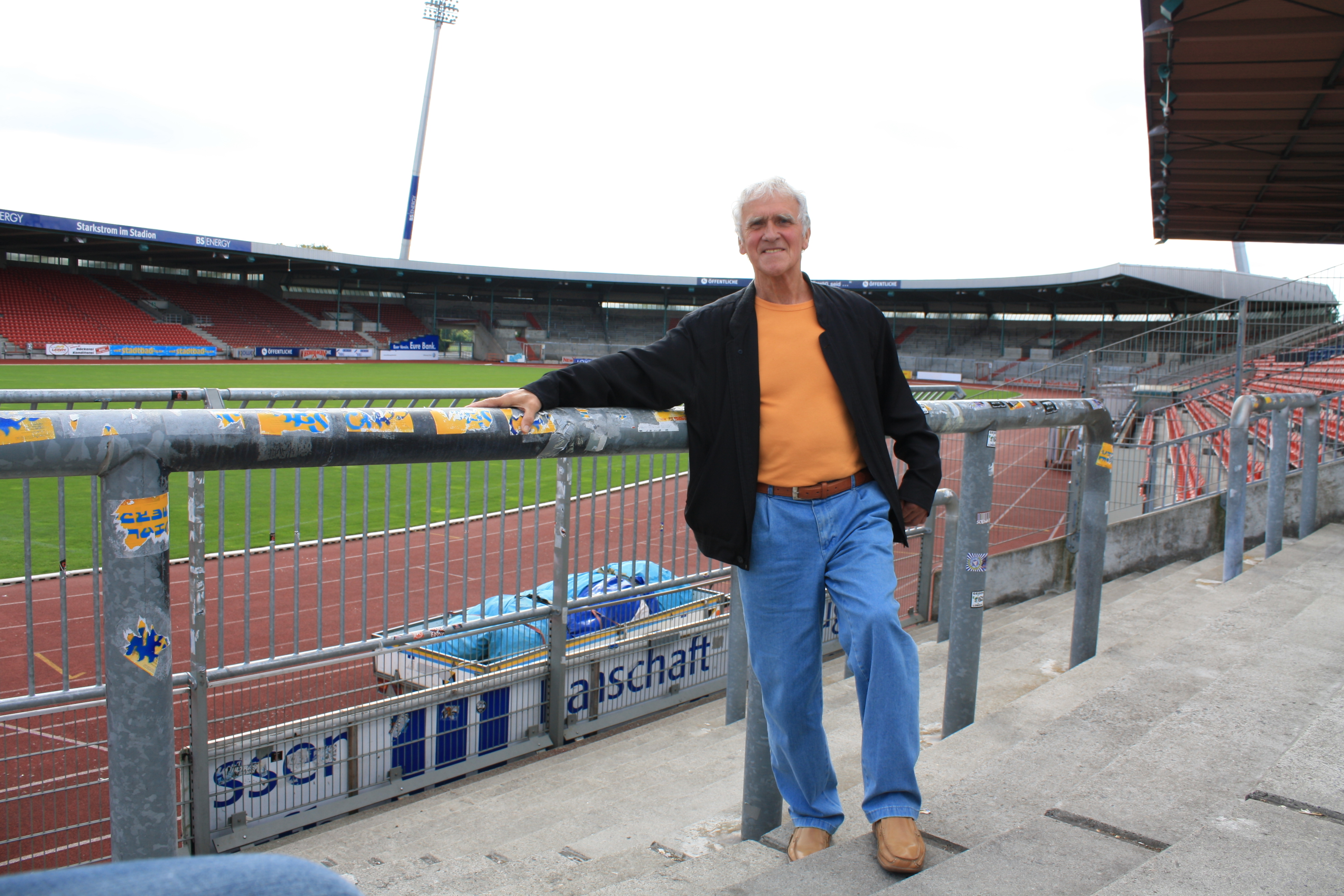
Walter Schmidt, one of the team's key players during the 1960s, pictured in the Eintracht-Stadion in 2009

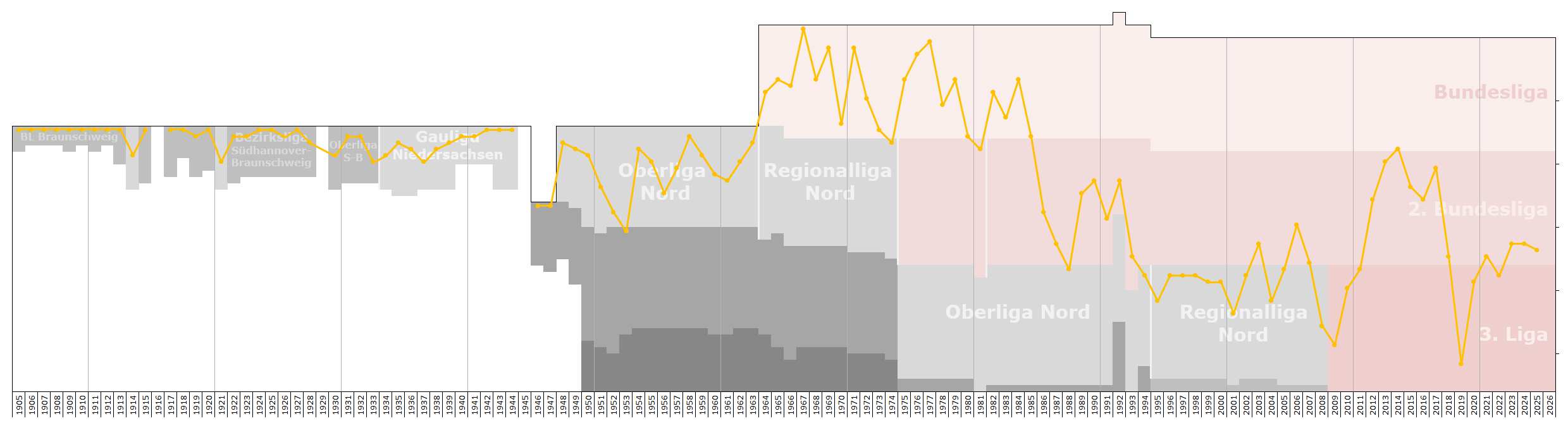
Historical chart of Eintracht Braunschweig league performance

As part of the denazification of Germany after World War II, the British authorities dissolved all previously existing sports clubs in Braunschweig and demanded the creation of a single, united sports club for the city. As such, Eintracht Braunschweig was merged into the new club TSV Braunschweig on 2 November 1945. TSV Braunschweig finally took on the club's current name, Braunschweiger TSV Eintracht von 1895, on 1 April 1949.

The club continued to play in the top division – now the Oberliga Nord – after the war, except a single season (1952–53) spent in tier II. The side was touched by tragedy in 1949 when goalkeeper Gustav Fähland died of internal bleeding a few days after being injured during a game in a collision with a Werder Bremen striker. Another appearance in the final round of the national championship came in 1958.

=== Bundesliga football 1963 to 1985 ===
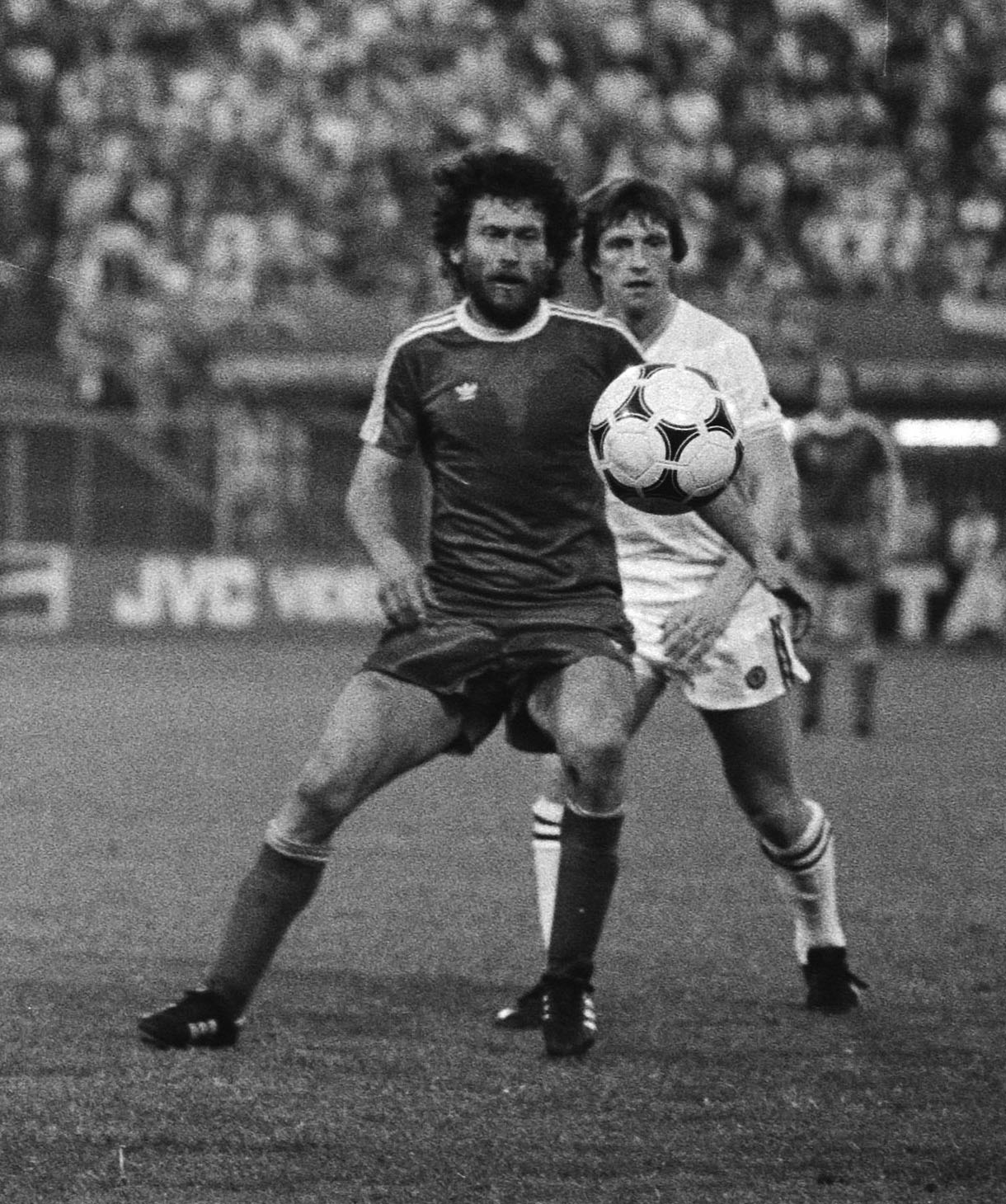
Paul Breitner, Eintracht Braunschweig's most prominent signing during the 1970s

Eintracht Braunschweig's consistently high standard of play and financial stability helped it to become one of the 16 teams selected out of a group of 46 applicants for play in the Bundesliga, the new federal professional league formed in 1963. Once again the side enjoyed early success, winning the national title in the 1966–67 season under manager Helmuth Johannsen with solid defensive play. That championship team gave up only 27 goals against, which stood as a Bundesliga record until bettered by Werder Bremen in 1988. Another ten players joined the national side from the team, mostly through the 1960s and 1970s.

The club was hit by tragedy again during the winter break of the 1968–69 season when forward Jürgen Moll, aged 29 at the time, and his wife died in a car accident. Two charity matches were played for the benefit of the Molls' children, the first featured West Germany's 1954 FIFA World Cup-winning squad in the line-up of the tournament's final, and the second saw a combined squad of Eintracht Braunschweig and rivals Hannover 96 take on a Bundesliga all-star team.

The club found itself embroiled in the Bundesliga scandal of 1971, but with a somewhat unusual twist. Several players accepted payments totalling 40,000 DM – not to underperform and so lose or tie a game, but rather to put out an extra effort to win. Ultimately, two players were suspended and another ten were fined.

In 1973, in the face of some opposition from the league, Braunschweig became the first Bundesliga side to sport a sponsor logo on its jerseys – that of Wolfenbüttel-based liquor producer Jägermeister. The move paid the team 100,000 DM and introduced a new way of doing business to football that is worth millions today. Other clubs quickly followed suit. Braunschweig's game against Schalke 04 on 24 March 1973 became the first Bundesliga match to feature a club having sponsorship on its jersey. Jägermeister continued to sponsor the club until 1987, although a later attempt to rename the team "Jägermeister Braunschweig" was finally refused by the DFB in 1983.

Eintracht Braunschweig just missed a second title in 1977 when it finished third, one point back of champion Borussia Mönchengladbach and just behind second-place finisher Schalke 04 on goal difference. The club made news after the season by signing 1974 World Cup winner Paul Breitner from Real Madrid for a transfer fee of 1.6 million DM. Breitner, however, did not fit into the team at all and was sold to Bayern Munich after just one season.

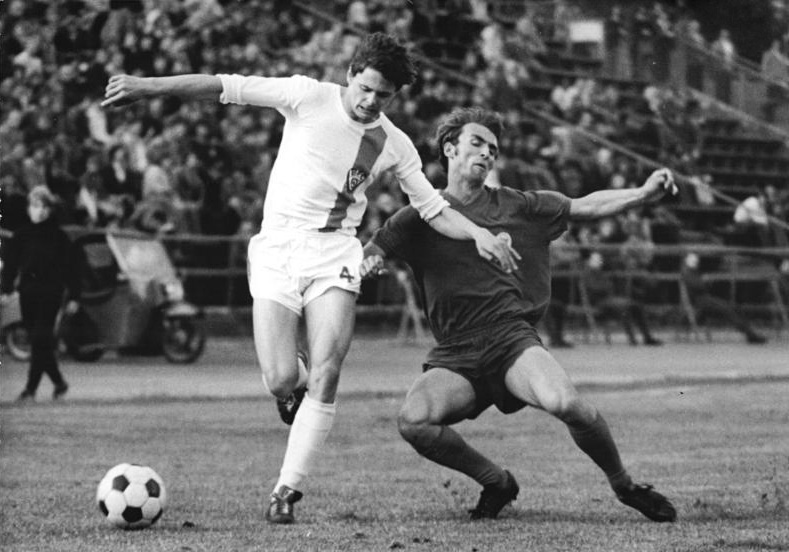
Lutz Eigendorf

=== Decline ===
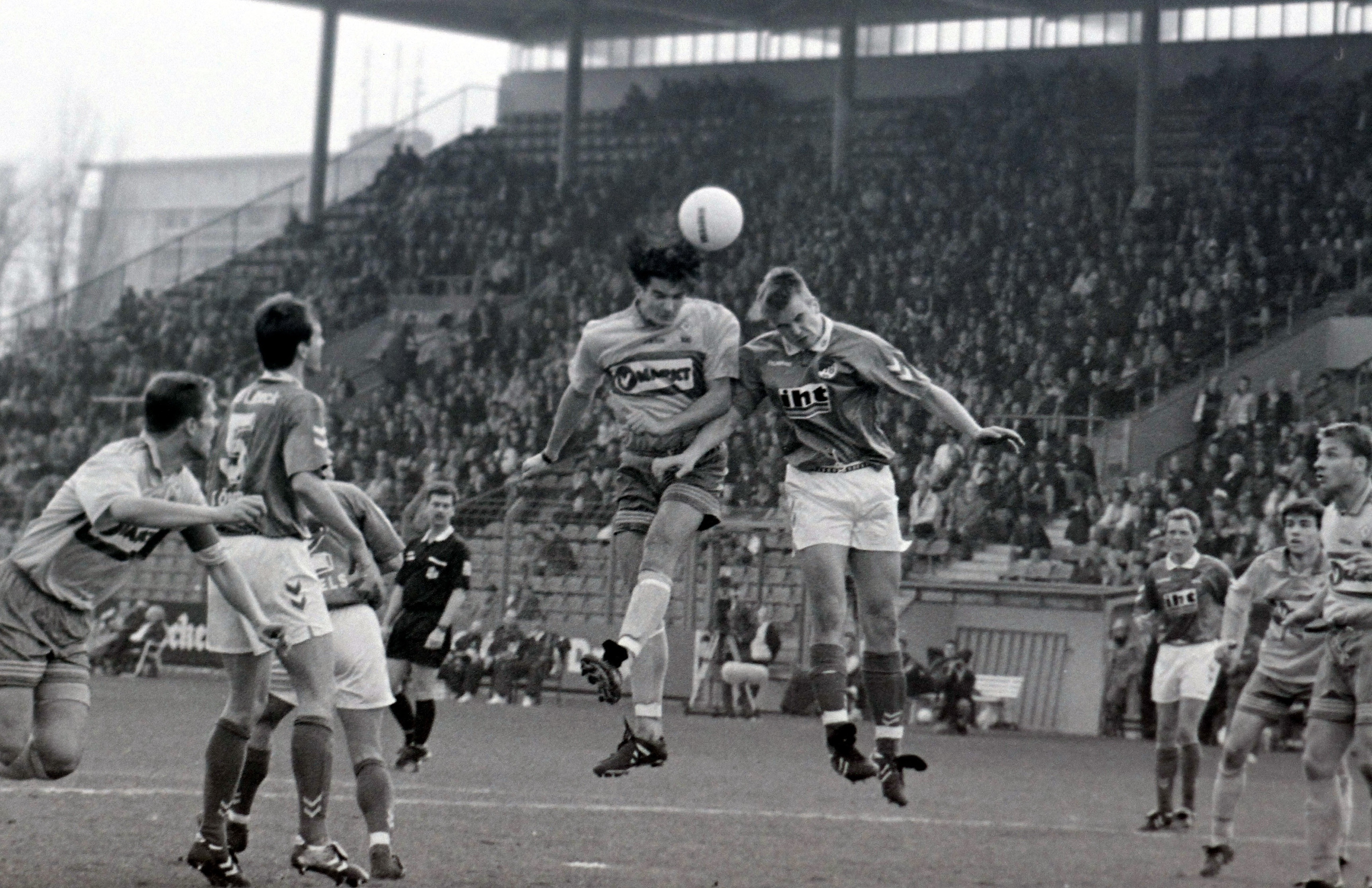
Regionalliga home game against VfB Lübeck in 1998

Since the 1985–86 season, the side has played at the tier II and III levels, with the exception of the 2013–14 season. In 1987, Braunschweig set a mark even as they were demoted; it became the only team ever to have been relegated with a positive goal difference. The side counted a casualty in the Cold War in the death of Lutz Eigendorf, who fled East Germany in 1979, where he played for Dynamo Berlin, to come to the west to play for 1. FC Kaiserslautern. Shortly after his transfer to Braunschweig in 1983, he died in a motor vehicle accident, which was revealed in 2000 as the assassination of a "traitor" arranged by the Stasi, East Germany's secret police.

The club played in the Bundesliga through to the mid-1980s, having been relegated just twice, playing in the second division in 1973–74 and again in 1980–81. During the club's run of 322 games in the Bundesliga from 1963 to 1973, it set a record that still stands by not seeing a single player red-carded. In 1984–85, Eintracht Braunschweig was relegated from the Bundesliga for the third time.

al difference, with 52 goals for and 47 against. After having been stuck in the Regionalliga for most of the 1990s, Eintracht Braunschweig moved constantly between the 2. Bundesliga and the Regionalliga during the 2000s. At the end of the 2007–08 Regionalliga season, the club was facing a severe crisis, both financially and on the field: Eintracht was in danger of missing out on qualification for Germany's new nationwide third-tier league 3. Liga, which would have meant Braunschweig's first ever relegation to the fourth level of the German football league system.

=== Recent history ===
However, under new manager Torsten Lieberknecht—who had taken on the role just a few weeks earlier—Eintracht Braunschweig secured qualification for the 3. Liga on the last matchday of the season. Moreover, under Lieberknecht and also newly appointed director of football Marc Arnold, the club continued to steadily improve throughout the next few seasons; a resurgence on and off the field that was widely recognized by the German media. In 2010–11, the team won promotion back to the 2. Bundesliga as champions of the 3. Liga. There, Eintracht Braunschweig re-established itself quickly, finishing the 2011–12 season comfortably mid-table. The 2012–13 season should prove even more successful, on the second matchday, Braunschweig took over a direct promotion spot and kept it for the rest of the season. On the 31st matchday, the club secured its return to the Bundesliga after 28 years in the second and third divisions with a 1–0 away win over FC Ingolstadt 04.

The team finished the 2013–14 Bundesliga season in 18th place and was therefore relegated again after one season in the top-flight. Eintracht Braunschweig had spent most of the season in a relegation spot, but had a chance to stay in the league until the last matchday. However, the club was officially relegated on 10 May 2014 after a 3–1 loss at 1899 Hoffenheim. Eintracht came close to a return to the Bundesliga in 2016–17, the club finished third in the 2. Bundesliga and qualified for the promotion play-off to the Bundesliga, but lost 2–0 on aggregate to VfL Wolfsburg to remain in the 2. Bundesliga. On 13 May 2018, Eintracht Braunschweig were relegated to the 3. Liga after a 6–2 loss to Holstein Kiel.

In 2018–19, poor performances on the pitch meant that Braunschweig almost got relegated to the fourth tier, Regionalliga Nord, surviving relegation on goal difference. In the following season, the club finished third to be promoted back to the 2. Bundesliga, before being relegated in 2020–21, followed by another promotion after a second-place finish.

== Crest and colours ==
=== Colours ===
Traditionally, Eintracht Braunschweig plays its home games in the colours blue and yellow. These colours are derived from the flag of the Duchy of Brunswick.

1963–1964	1964–1966	1966–1971	1971–1981	1981–1987

=== Crest ===
The club's crest contains a red lion on a white ground. This symbol is derived from the coat of arms of the city of Braunschweig, which in turn is based on the insignia of Henry the Lion. The club badge went through various different versions during its history, most of the time however, it consisted of a circular badge in blue and yellow, with a red lion on a white shield in the center of the circle.

In 1972–73, Eintracht Braunschweig scrapped the original crest and replaced it with a new design based on the logo of its sponsor, Jägermeister. This was initially done to circumvent the DFB's ban on shirt sponsors – a loophole in those rules allowed to club to put a very close looking symbol on their shirt as long as it was the club's official crest. In 1986, after Jägermeister stopped the sponsorship of the club, Eintracht Braunschweig adopted a new, diamond-shaped logo containing the traditional red lion as well as the club's colours blue and yellow.

In 2011, the club members voted to return to the club's more traditional round crest. In March 2012, the club then presented the new version of the crest, which was adopted as the official logo at the start of the 2012–13 season. For the 2016–17 season, the club wore a special anniversary crest to commemorate the 50th anniversary of the club's 1966–67 Bundesliga title.

Flag of the Duchy of Brunswick

Coat of arms of Braunschweig

Historical version of the round logo, in use during the 1960s and early 70s

Diamond shaped logo, in use 1986–2012

Anniversary crest, worn during the 2016–17 season

== Stadium ==
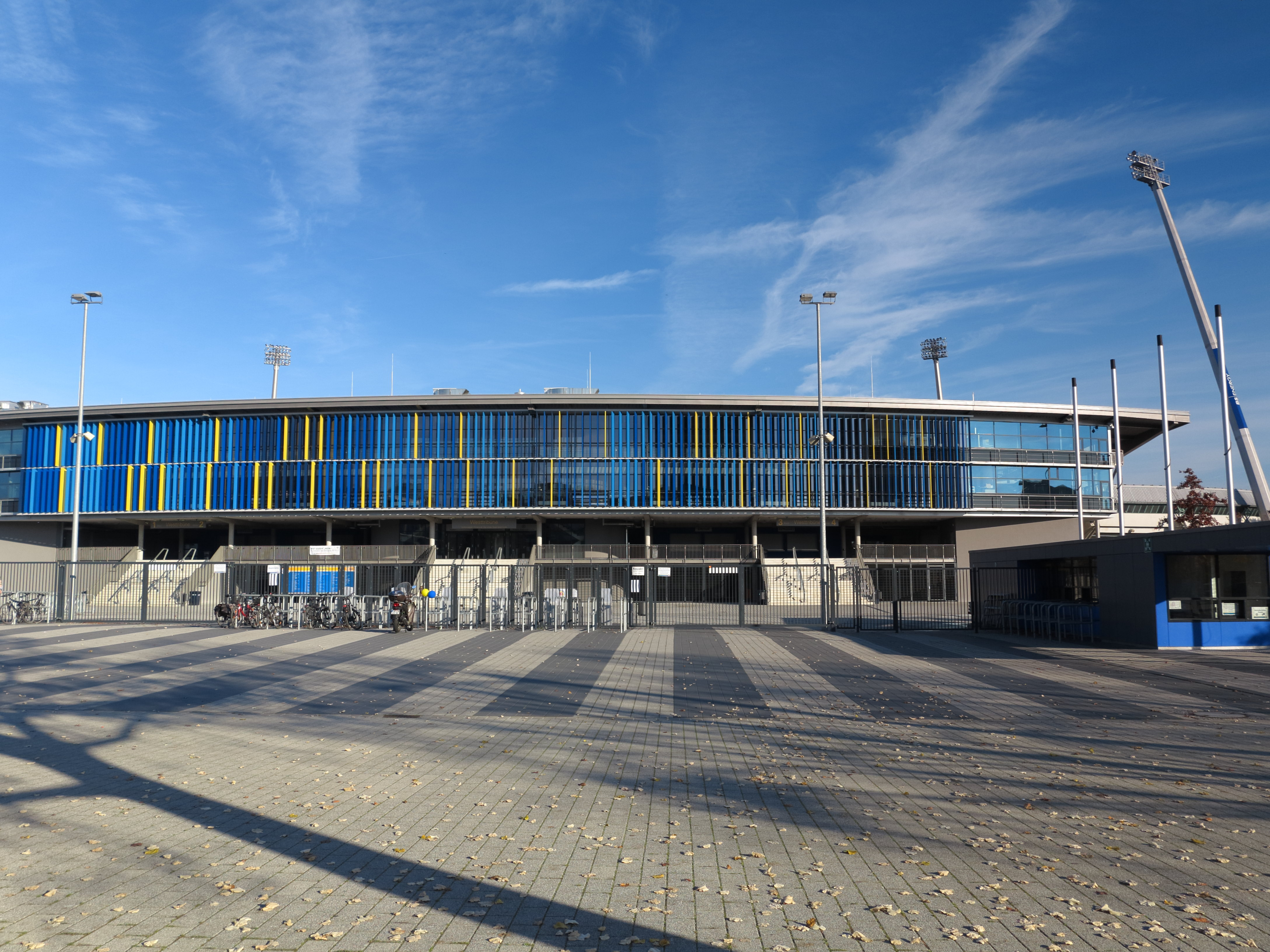
Eintracht-Stadion

Eintracht Braunschweig plays at the Eintracht-Stadion in Braunschweig, built in 1923. Currently the stadium has a capacity of ca. 25,000, during the 1960s it held up to 38,000 people. Before the construction of the Eintracht-Stadion, the club played its home games at Sportplatz an der Helmstedter Straße, which held 3,000 people.

== Supporters ==
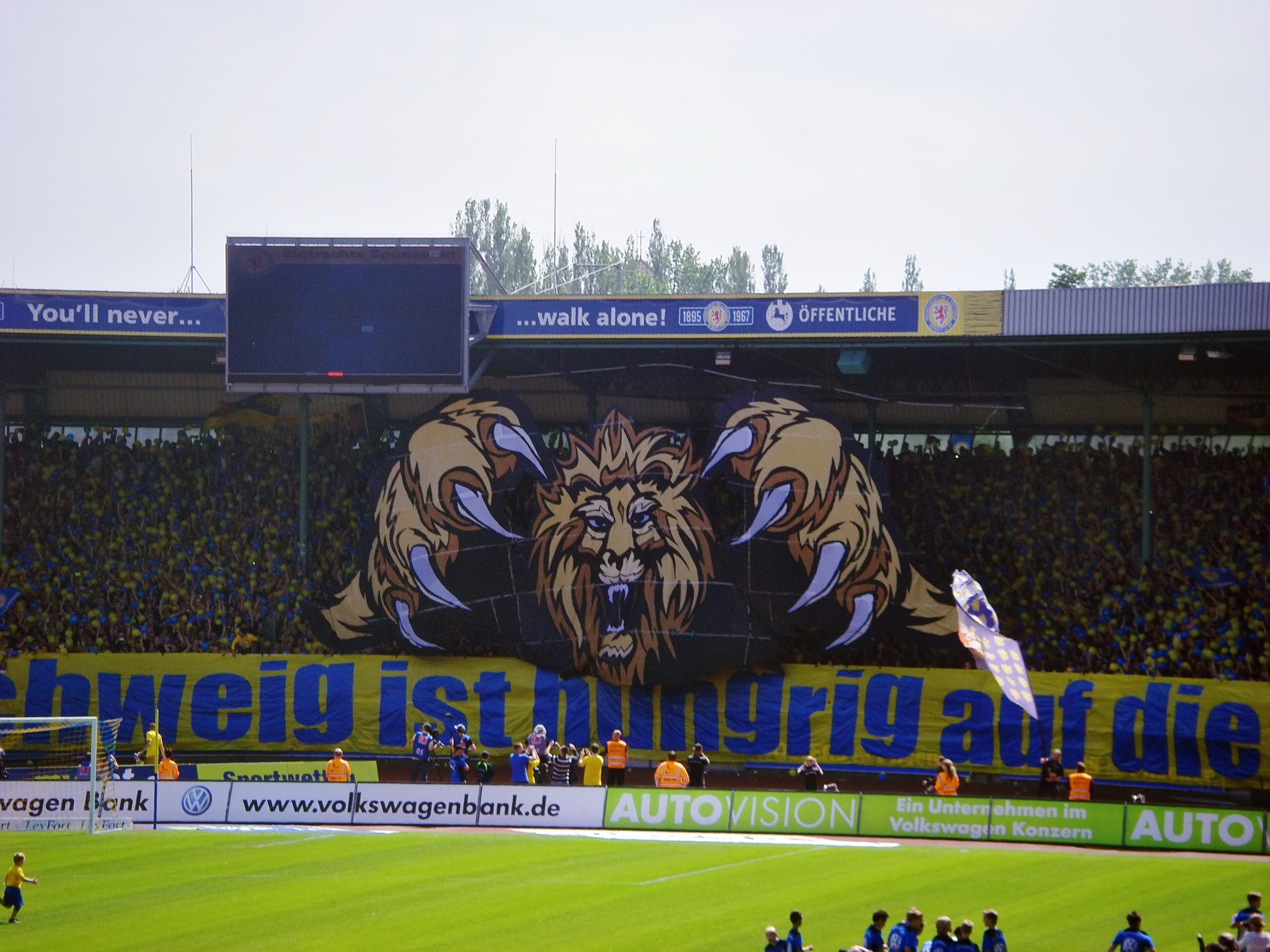
Eintracht Braunschweig supporters in 2013

Despite spending recent years in the lower divisions, the club's fan support has remained strong: with 21,396 per game, Eintracht Braunschweig had the 24th-highest average attendance of any sports team in Germany during the 2011–12 season.

While friendly fan relations exist with 1. FC Magdeburg, Waldhof Mannheim, and Swiss club Basel, Eintracht Braunschweig has a strong rivalry with Hannover 96.

Because of Wolfsburg's immediate proximity to Braunschweig, journalists often report a rivalry with VfL Wolfsburg. Matches between the two are often referred to as a derby. This is denied by the fans of Eintracht Braunschweig as well as those of Hannover 96, who only consider their matches against each other as the only true Lower Saxony derby.

== Recent seasons ==
Year	Division	Tier	Position
1963–64	Bundesliga	I	11th
1964–65	Bundesliga	I	9th
1965–66	Bundesliga	I	10th
1966–67	Bundesliga	I	1st
1967–68	Bundesliga	I	9th
1968–69	Bundesliga	I	4th
1969–70	Bundesliga	I	16th
1970–71	Bundesliga	I	4th
1971–72	Bundesliga	I	12th
1972–73	Bundesliga	I	17th ↓
1973–74	2. Bundesliga	II	1st ↑
1974–75	Bundesliga	I	9th
1975–76	Bundesliga	I	5th
1976–77	Bundesliga	I	3rd
1977–78	Bundesliga	I	13th
1978–79	Bundesliga	I	9th
1979–80	Bundesliga	I	18th ↓
1980–81	2. Bundesliga	II	2nd ↑
1981–82	Bundesliga	I	11th
1982–83	Bundesliga	I	15th
1983–84	Bundesliga	I	9th
1984–85	Bundesliga	I	18th ↓
1985–86	2. Bundesliga	II	12th
1986–87	2. Bundesliga	II	17th ↓
1987–88	Amateur-Oberliga Nord	III	1st ↑
1988–89	2. Bundesliga	II	9th
1989–90	2. Bundesliga	II	7th
1990–91	2. Bundesliga	II	13th
1991–92	2. Bundesliga	II	7th
1992–93	2. Bundesliga	II	19th ↓
1993–94	Amateur-Oberliga Nord	III	2nd
1994–95	Regionalliga Nord	III	6th
1995–96	Regionalliga Nord	III	2nd
1996–97	Regionalliga Nord	III	2nd
1997–98	Regionalliga Nord	III	2nd
1998–99	Regionalliga Nord	III	3rd
1999–2000	Regionalliga Nord	III	3rd
2000–01	Regionalliga Nord	III	8th
2001–02	Regionalliga Nord	III	2nd ↑
2002–03	2. Bundesliga	II	15th ↓
2003–04	Regionalliga Nord	III	6th
2004–05	Regionalliga Nord	III	1st ↑
2005–06	2. Bundesliga	II	12th
2006–07	2. Bundesliga	II	18th ↓
2007–08	Regionalliga Nord	III	10th
2008–09	3. Liga	III	13th
2009–10	3. Liga	III	4th
2010–11	3. Liga	III	1st ↑
2011–12	2. Bundesliga	II	8th
2012–13	2. Bundesliga	II	2nd ↑
2013–14	Bundesliga	I	18th ↓
2014–15	2. Bundesliga	II	6th
2015–16	2. Bundesliga	II	8th
2016–17	2. Bundesliga	II	3rd
2017–18	2. Bundesliga	II	17th ↓
2018–19	3. Liga	III	16th
2019–20	3. Liga	III	3rd ↑
2020–21	2. Bundesliga	II	17th ↓
2021–22	3. Liga	III	2nd ↑
2022–23	2. Bundesliga	II	15th
2023–24	2. Bundesliga	II	15th
2024–25	2. Bundesliga	II	16th
2025–26	2. Bundesliga	II	15th
2026–27	2. Bundesliga	II	

Key

↑ Promoted	↓ Relegated

== League history ==
Between 1904 and 1985, Eintracht Braunschweig spent all but three seasons in Germany's top division. Between 1985 and 2013, the club then alternated between the second and third level of the German league pyramid, before returning to the top flight for the first time in 28 years at the end of the 2012–13 season.

== Honours ==
League

- Bundesliga:
  - Champions: 1966–67
- 2. Bundesliga (II):^{2}
  - Runners-up: 1980–81, 2012–13
- 3. Liga (III):
  - Champions: 2010–11
- Regionalliga Nord (II):
  - Champions: 1973–74
- Amateuroberliga Niedersachsen-Ost (II):
  - Champions: 1952–53
- Regionalliga Nord (III):
  - Champions: 2004–05
- Amateur-Oberliga Nord (III):
  - Champions: 1987–88

^{2}Includes 2. Bundesliga Nord (1974–81).

Regional

- Northern German championship:
  - Champions: 1907–08, 1912–13
- Gauliga Südhannover-Braunschweig:
  - Champions: 1942–43, 1943–44
- Südkreisliga/Bezirksliga Südhannover-Braunschweig/Oberliga Südhannover-Braunschweig:
  - Champions: 1923–24, 1924–25
- Duchy/Free State of Brunswick championship:^{1}
  - Champions: 1904–05, 1905–06, 1906–07, 1907–08, 1908–09, 1909–10, 1910–11, 1911–12, 1912–13, 1915–16, 1916–17, 1917–18, 1919–20
- Lower Saxony Cup (Tiers III–V):
  - Winners: 2003–04, 2010–11
  - Runners-up: 1998–99, 2008–09

^{1}No championship was played in 1914 and 1915

== European record ==
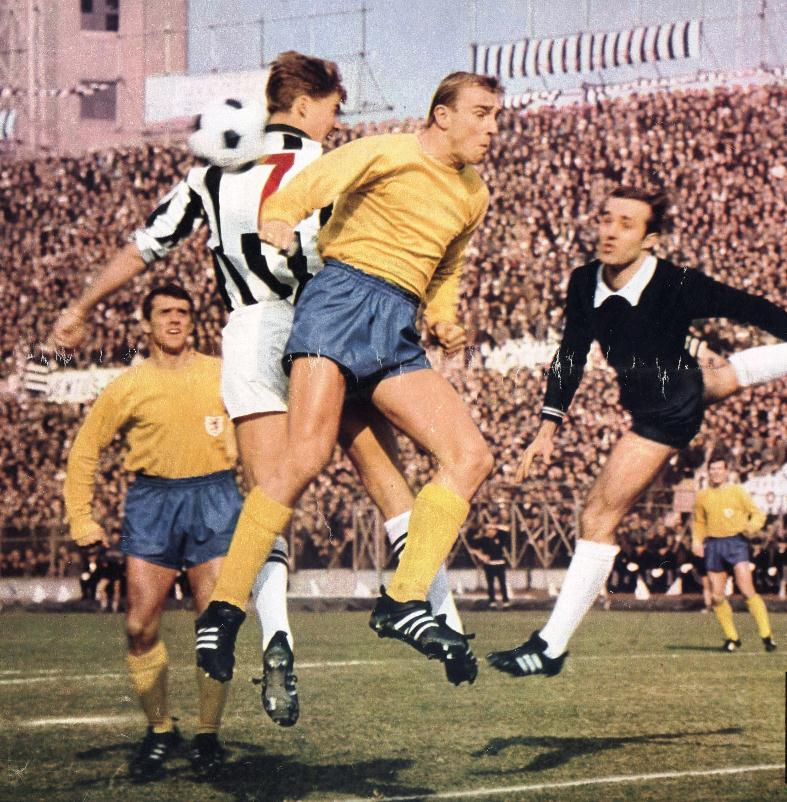
1967–68 European Cup quarter-finals 2nd leg versus Juventus in Turin.

Season	Competition	Round	Nation	Club	Home	Away	Aggregate	Result
1967–68	European Cup	1st round	(Albania)	Dinamo Tirana	–	–	(w/o)	Win
		2nd round	(Austria)	Rapid Wien	2–0	0–1	2–1	Win
		Quarter-finals	(Italy)	Juventus	3–2	0–1	3–3^{1}	Loss
1971–72	UEFA Cup	1st round	(Northern Ireland)	Glentoran	6–1	1–0	7–1	Win
		2nd round	(Spain)	Atlético Bilbao	2–1	2–2	4–3	Win
		3rd round	(Hungary)	Ferencváros	1–1	2–5	3–6	Loss
1976–77	UEFA Cup	1st round	(Denmark)	Holbæk B&I	7–0	0–1	7–1	Win
		2nd round	(Spain)	Español	2–1	0–2	2–3	Loss
1977–78	UEFA Cup	1st round	(Soviet Union)	Dinamo Kiev	0–0	1–1	1–1^{2}	Win
		2nd round	(Norway)	Start	4–0	0–1	4–1	Win
		3rd round	(Netherlands)	PSV	1–2	0–2	1–4	Loss

^{1} Juventus beat Eintracht Braunschweig 1–0 in a play-off in Bern to reach the semi-finals.

^{2} Eintracht Braunschweig progressed to the second round on away goals.

=== Intertoto Cup record ===
Season	Competition	Round	Nation	Club	Home	Away
1964–65	International Football Cup	Group A2	(Netherlands)	DWS	2–0	0–4
		Group A2	(Switzerland)	FC La Chaux-de-Fonds	1–1	0–2
		Group A2	(Belgium)	Beringen	2–1	3–2
1965–66	International Football Cup	Group A4	(Sweden)	Örgryte IS	3–0	1–3
		Group A4	(Netherlands)	Sparta Rotterdam	1–2	0–3
		Group A4	(Switzerland)	Luzern	7–0	4–4
1966–67	International Football Cup	Group B3	(Poland)	Górnik Zabrze	8–0	0–4
		Group B3	(East Germany)	Carl Zeiss Jena	1–2	1–2
		Group B3	(Sweden)	AIK	5–1	2–0
1968	Intertoto Cup	Group B7	(Switzerland)	Lausanne-Sports	2–1	1–4
		Group B7	(Austria)	Wacker Innsbruck	3–1	2–1
		Group B7	(Denmark)	AB	2–0	0–0
1970	Intertoto Cup	Group B1	(Switzerland)	Grasshopper	2–0	1–5
		Group B1	(Sweden)	IFK Norrköping	1–0	2–2
		Group B1	(Austria)	Wiener SC	3–0	1–1
1971	Intertoto Cup	Group 6	(Sweden)	Malmö FF	0–1	1–0
		Group 6	(Poland)	Zagłębie Wałbrzych	1–0	1–0
		Group 6	(Switzerland)	Young Boys	2–0	5–1
1972	Intertoto Cup	Group 6	(Czechoslovakia)	TJ ZVL Žilina	5–0	1–1
		Group 6	(Sweden)	Landskrona BoIS	2–0	0–3
		Group 6	(Denmark)	Vejle BK	4–1	3–0
1973	Intertoto Cup	Group 9	(Czechoslovakia)	AC Nitra	1–2	1–1
		Group 9	(Netherlands)	FC Amsterdam	1–4	0–0
		Group 9	(Denmark)	Vejle BK	0–3	2–0
1975	Intertoto Cup	Group 3	(Socialist Federal Republic of Yugoslavia)	Vojvodina	2–1	1–3
		Group 3	(Switzerland)	Zürich	2–0	0–1
		Group 3	(Denmark)	Vejle BK	3–0	5–0
1976	Intertoto Cup	Group 4	(Czechoslovakia)	Baník Ostrava	0–2	0–0
		Group 4	(Austria)	SSW Innsbruck	1–1	0–1
		Group 4	(Sweden)	AIK	2–1	3–1
1978	Intertoto Cup	Group 4	(Belgium)	Standard Liège	0–1	1–0
		Group 4	(Switzerland)	Grasshoppers	0–0	2–0
		Group 4	(Denmark)	B 1903	5–1	2–1
1979	Intertoto Cup	Group 3	(Sweden)	Malmö FF	3–1	2–2
		Group 3	(Czechoslovakia)	Slavia Prague	2–0	1–1
		Group 3	(Switzerland)	St. Gallen	3–2	4–1
1983	Intertoto Cup	Group 10	(Czechoslovakia)	TJ Vítkovice	0–2	2–2
		Group 10	(Bulgaria)	Trakia Plovdiv	2–0	1–0
		Group 10	(Sweden)	IF Elfsborg	4–0	0–1
1984	Intertoto Cup	Group 4	(Belgium)	Standard Liège	3–1	1–4
		Group 4	(Denmark)	OB	0–0	1–1
		Group 4	(Netherlands)	Go Ahead Eagles	2–1	1–2
1985	Intertoto Cup	Group 5	(East Germany)	Wismut Aue	2–1	2–3
		Group 5	(Czechoslovakia)	Slavia Prague	4–1	0–4
		Group 5	(Norway)	Viking	6–3	1–2

== Players ==
=== Current squad ===
As of 2 September 2026

Note: Flags indicate national team as defined under FIFA eligibility rules; some limited exceptions apply. Players may hold more than one non-FIFA nationality.

No.	Pos.	Nation	Player
1	GK	GER	Ron-Thorben Hoffmann (captain)
3	DF	GER	Noah Katterbach (on loan from Hamburger SV)
4	DF	KOS	Andi Hoti
5	DF	GER	Frederik Jäkel
6	MF	GER	Florian Flick
7	FW	GER	Yann Sturm
8	MF	TUR	Mehmet Aydın
9	FW	AUT	Maximilian Entrup
10	MF	GER	Samuele Di Benedetto
11	FW	SRB	Jovan Mijatović (on loan from New York City)
15	MF	GER	Max Marie
17	MF	GER	Aaron Opoku
19	FW	SUI	Arlet Junior Zé
20	MF	GER	Lino Tempelmann

No.	Pos.	Nation	Player
21	DF	GER	Kevin Ehlers
22	DF	GER	Fabio Di Michele Sanchez
23	DF	GRE	Isidoros Koutsidis
24	FW	GER	Sidi Sané
25	DF	GER	Sanoussy Ba
26	MF	GER	Tristan Wagner
27	FW	GER	Jan Urbich (on loan from Borussia Mönchengladbach)
29	DF	GER	Lukas Frenkert
30	MF	GER	Robin Heußer
32	GK	GER	Benjamin Uphoff
33	GK	GER	Nick Bodon
37	MF	GER	Sidney Raebiger
43	DF	AUT	Damjan Kovacevic

=== Out on loan ===
Note: Flags indicate national team as defined under FIFA eligibility rules; some limited exceptions apply. Players may hold more than one non-FIFA nationality.

No. / Pos. / Nation / Player; — / DF / GER / Louis Breunig (at Würzburger Kickers until 30 June 2027)	No. / Pos. / Nation / Player; — / MF / GER / Jona Borsum (at SV Meppen until 30 June 2027)

=== Former players ===
The list includes players with at least 250 games or 50 goals for Eintracht Braunschweig's first team, as well as players with at least one cap for their country's national or Olympic football team. However, players who did not receive any of their caps while playing for Eintracht Braunschweig are only included if they made at least ten appearances for the club.

Germany

- (Germany) Holger Aden (1989–1992)
- (Germany) Joachim Bäse (1959–1973)
- (Germany) Karim Bellarabi (2008–2011, 2013–2014)
- (Germany) Mirko Boland (2009–2018)
- (Germany) Paul Breitner (1977–1978)
- (Germany) Ludwig Bründl (1971–1975)
- (Germany) Bernd Buchheister (1985–1993)
- (Germany) Konrad "Otto" Bülte (1903–1911)
- (Germany) Bernd Dörfel (1968–1970)
- (Germany) Wolfgang Dremmler (1973–1979)
- (Germany) Dietmar Erler (1970–1981)
- (Germany) Wolfgang Frank (1974–1978)
- (Germany) Bernd Franke (1971–1985)
- (Germany) Willi Fricke (1938–1952)
- (Germany) Bernd Gersdorff (1969–1977)
- (Germany) Klaus Gerwien (1961–1974)
- (Germany) Wolfgang Grzyb (1966–1978)
- (Germany) Friedhelm Haebermann (1969–1978)
- (Germany) Otto Harder (1909–1913)
- (Germany) Winfried Herz (1951–1961)
- (Germany) Reiner Hollmann (1973–1984)
- (Germany) Hans Jäcker (1956–1967)
- (Germany) Peter Kaack (1963–1973)
- (Germany) Dennis Kruppke (2008–2015)
- (Germany) Ludwig Lachner (1934–1949)
- (Germany) Max Lorenz (1969–1972)
- (Germany) Peter Lux (1981–1985, 1990–1993)
- (Germany) Erich Maas (1964–1970)
- (Germany) Franz Merkhoffer (1968–1984)
- (Germany) Jürgen Moll (1957–1968)
- (Germany) Harald Nickel (1978–1979)
- (Germany) Walter Poppe (1904–1912)
- (Germany) Richard Queck (1907–1914)
- (Germany) Tobias Rau (1999–2001)
- (Germany) Uwe Reinders (1987–1988)
- (Germany) Walter Schmidt (1959–1969)
- (Germany) Dirk Schuster (1990–1991)
- (Germany) Albert Sukop (1930–1948)
- (Germany) Werner Thamm (1950–1962)
- (Germany) Lothar Ulsaß (1964–1971)
- (Germany) Horst Wolter (1961–1972)
- (Germany) Ronnie Worm (1979–1987)
- (Germany) Heinz Wozniakowski (1951–1958)
- (Germany) Dieter Zembski (1975–1980)

International

- (Norway) Mushaga Bakenga (2014–2015)
- (Ukraine) Ihor Belanov (1991–1994)
- (Iceland) Magnús Bergs (1984–1985)
- (Bosnia and Herzegovina) Ermin Bičakčić (2012–2014)
- (Sweden) Hasse Borg (1977–1983)
- (Cameroon) Serge Branco (1998–2000)
- (Denmark) Tommy Christensen (1988–1989)
- (Iran) Daniel Davari (2009–2014)
- (Tunisia) Fahed Dermech (1999–2000)
- (Canada) Randy Edwini-Bonsu (2011–2013)
- (Norway) Omar Elabdellaoui (2013–2014)
- (Soviet Union) (Russia) Sergei Fokin (1992–2000)
- (Jamaica) Milton Griffiths (2000–2001)
- (Norway) Vegar Eggen Hedenstad (2014–2015)
- (Austria) Reinhold Hintermaier (1984–1986)
- (Tajikistan) Alexander Huber (2007)
- (Slovenia) Rudi Istenič (2001–2002)
- (Canada) Simeon Jackson (2013)
- (Denmark) Bent Jensen (1972–1973)
- (Albania) Bekim Kastrati (2006–2007)
- (Japan) Yahiro Kazama (1988–1989)
- (Serbia and Montenegro) Miloš Kolaković (1995–2001)
- (Tunisia) Jameleddine Limam (1990–1991)
- (Tunisia) Mohamed Ali Mahjoubi (1991–1993)
- (Poland) Adam Matuszczyk (2015–2017)
- (Democratic Republic of the Congo) Michél Mazingu-Dinzey (2002–2004)
- (Denmark) Allan Michaelsen (1972–1974)
- (Romania) Valentin Năstase (2007–2009)
- (Norway) Håvard Nielsen (2014–2015)
- (Ghana) Phil Ofosu-Ayeh (2015–2017)
- (Slovenia) Nik Omladič (2015–2017)
- (Ukraine) Viktor Pasulko (1993–1996)
- (Socialist Federal Republic of Yugoslavia) Danilo Popivoda (1975–1981)
- (United States) Horst Rick (1960–1961)
- (Malta) André Schembri (2007–2008)
- (Bosnia and Herzegovina) Damir Vrančić (2009–2016)
- (Liberia) Josephus Yenay (2000–2001)
- (Socialist Federal Republic of Yugoslavia) Ilija Zavišić (1980–1984)
- (China) Zhang Chengdong (2012–2013)

== Staff ==
=== Current technical staff ===
Position	Name
Head coach	(Germany) Lars Kornetka
Assistant coach	(Austria) Stefan Kulovits (Germany) Marc Pfitzner (Germany) Marcel Goslar
Goalkeeper coach	(Bosnia and Herzegovina) Jasmin Fejzić
Performance manager	(Germany) Jesper Schwarz
Team manager	(Germany) Holm Stelzer
Medical director physiotherapy	(Germany) Christian Degenhardt
Physiotherapist	(Germany) Florian Horn
Club doctor	(Germany) Florian Brand (Germany) Prof. Dr. Thomas Gösling (Germany) Dr. Alexander Ruhe (Germany) Simon Fitzner
Equipment manager	(Germany) Christian Skolik
Team official	(Germany) Berthold Schliwa

=== Manager history ===
Caretaker managers in italics.

- (Germany) Georg Knöpfle (1937–48)
- (Germany) Woldemar Gerschler (1948–49)
- (Germany) Hans-Georg Vogel (1949–52)
- (Germany) Edmund Conen (1952–56)
- (Germany) Kurt Baluses (1956–60)
- (Germany) Hermann Lindemann (1960–61)
- (Germany) Hans-Georg Vogel (1961–63)
- (Germany) Helmuth Johannsen (1 July 1963 – 30 June 1970)
- (Germany) Otto Knefler (1 July 1970 – 30 June 1974)
- (Socialist Federal Republic of Yugoslavia) Branko Zebec (6 July 1974 – 30 June 1978)
- (Germany) Werner Olk (1 July 1978 – 21 March 1979)
- (Germany) Heinz Patzig (21 March 1979 – 27 March 1979)
- (Germany) Heinz Lucas (27 March 1979 – 8 October 1979)
- (Germany) Uli Maslo (14 Oct 1979 – 23 April 1983)
- (Germany) Heinz Patzig (24 April 1983 – 30 June 1983)
- (Socialist Federal Republic of Yugoslavia) Aleksandar Ristić (1 July 1983 – 15 April 1985)
- (Germany) Heinz Patzig (16 April 1985 – 30 June 1985)
- (Germany) Willibert Kremer (1 July 1985 – 9 March 1986)
- (Germany) Heinz Patzig (14 March 1986 – 30 June 1986)
- (Germany) Gerd Roggensack (1 July 1986 – 30 June 1987)
- (Germany) Uwe Reinders (1 July 1987 – 30 June 1990)
- (Germany) Joachim Streich (1 July 1990 – 31 March 1991)
- (Germany) Werner Fuchs (29 March 1991 – 10 October 1992)
- (Germany) Uli Maslo (14 Oct 1992 – 30 June 1993)
- (Germany) Wolf-Rüdiger Krause (1 July 1993 – 30 June 1994)
- (Sweden) Jan Olsson (1 July 1994 – 24 September 1995)
- (Germany) Heinz-Günter Scheil (25 September 1995 – 23 October 1995)
- (Germany) Benno Möhlmann (24 Oct 1995 – 30 June 1997)
- (Germany) Michael Lorkowski (1 July 1997 – 9 November 1998)
- (Germany) Dirk Holdorf (10 Nov 1998 – 23 November 1998)
- (Germany) Wolfgang Sandhowe (23 Nov 1998 – 15 April 1999)
- (Germany) Uwe Hain (16 April 1999 – 30 June 1999)
- (Germany) Reinhold Fanz (1 July 1999 – 17 May 2001)
- (Germany) Uwe Hain (18 May 2001 – 30 June 2001)
- (Germany) Peter Vollmann (1 July 2001 – 20 October 2002)
- (Germany) Uwe Reinders (25 Oct 2002 – 2 March 2004)
- (Germany) Wolfgang Loos (2 March 2004 – 15 March 2004)
- (Germany) Michael Krüger (15 March 2004 – 4 October 2006)
- (Germany) Willi Kronhardt (5 Oct 2006 – 14 October 2006)
- (Serbia) Đurađ Vasić (15 Oct 2006 – 14 November 2006)
- (Germany) Willi Reimann (14 Nov 2006 – 20 March 2007)
- (Germany) Dietmar Demuth (20 March 2007 – 30 June 2007)
- (Germany) Benno Möhlmann (1 July 2007 – 12 May 2008)
- (Germany) Torsten Lieberknecht (12 May 2008 – 14 May 2018)
- (Denmark) Henrik Pedersen (30 May 2018 – 10 October 2018)
- (Germany) André Schubert (10 Oct 2018 – 30 June 2019)
- (Germany) Christian Flüthmann (1 Jul 2019 – 17 November 2019)
- (Germany) Marco Antwerpen (18 Nov 2019 – 7 July 2020)
- (Germany) Daniel Meyer (10 July 2020 – 30 June 2021)
- (Germany) Michael Schiele (1 July 2021 – 30 June 2023)
- (Germany) Jens Härtel (1 July 2023 – 23 October 2023)
- (Germany) Marc Pfitzner (23 Oct 2023 – 7 November 2023)
- (Germany) Daniel Scherning (7 Nov 2023 – 19 May 2025)
- (Germany) Marc Pfitzner (19 May 2025 – 30 June 2025)
- (Germany) Heiner Backhaus (1 Jul 2025 – 10 March 2026)
- (Germany) Lars Kornetka (10 Mar 2026 – )

=== Notable former presidents ===
The list includes former presidents and chairmen of Eintracht Braunschweig who have their own Wikipedia article.

- Johannes Runge (1903–1914)
- Hans Jäcker (1980–1983)
- Günter Mast (1983–1986)
- Gerhard Glogowski (2000–2007)

== Records ==
- Home victory, Bundesliga: 6–0 v Rot-Weiss Essen, 21 May 1977/6–0 v VfB Stuttgart, 5 April 1975
- Away victory, Bundesliga: 7–1 v Arminia Bielefeld, 28 June 1972
- Home loss, Bundesliga: 0–6 v Borussia Mönchengladbach, 29 October 1977
- Away loss, Bundesliga: 0–10 v Borussia Mönchengladbach, 11 October 1984
- Most appearances, all competitions total: 563, Franz Merkhoffer 1968–1984
- Most appearances, Bundesliga: 419, Franz Merkhoffer 1968–1984
- Most goals scored, total: 116, Werner Thamm 1950–1962
- Most goals scored, Bundesliga: 84, Lothar Ulsaß 1964–1971
- Most goals scored, season, Bundesliga: 24, Wolfgang Frank, 1976–77
- Most goals scored, season, 2. Bundesliga: 30, Ronnie Worm, 1980–81

== Reserve and youth teams ==
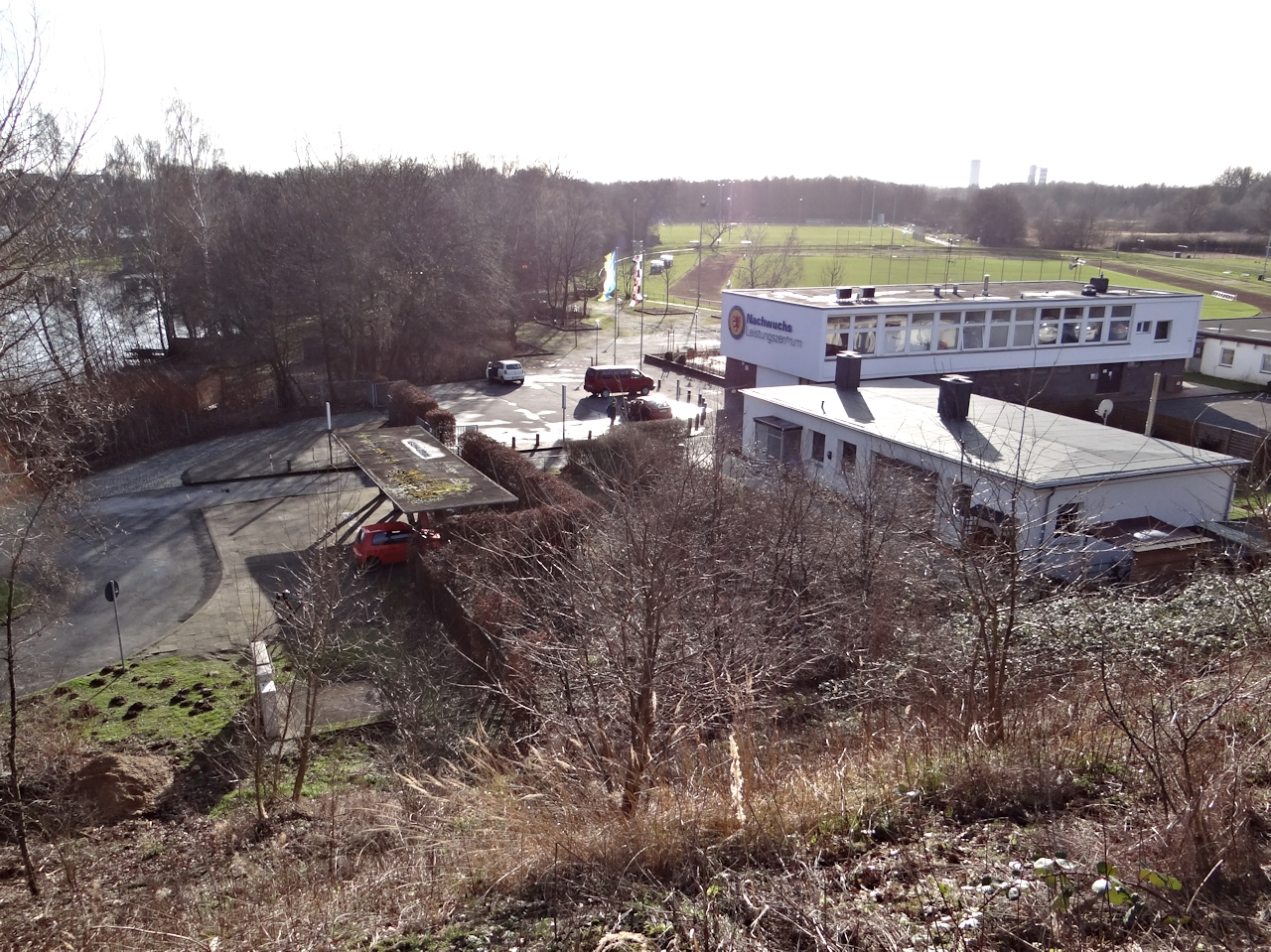
Eintracht Braunschweig youth academy.

=== Reserve team ===
==== Honours ====
- German amateur championship:
  - Runners-up: 1970
- Amateuroberliga Niedersachsen-Ost (II):
  - Champions: 1956
  - Runners-up: 1955
- Amateurliga Niedersachsen, Staffel 4 (Braunschweig) (III):
  - Champions: 1954
- Lower Saxony championship:
  - Champions: 1970, 2000, 2002, 2010, 2013
  - Runners-up: 1985, 2005

=== Youth ===
==== Honours ====
- German Youth Cup:
  - Winners: 2017
  - Runners-up: 1992

== Other sports ==
As a multi-sports club, Eintracht Braunschweig also has departments for athletics, basketball, chess, darts, field hockey, gymnastics, team handball, swimming and water polo, tennis and winter sports. The club was especially successful in athletics and swimming from the 1940s until the 1960s, with the club's athletes, among them the then-current 800 metres world record holder Rudolf Harbig, winning over 40 national championships during that period.

=== Field hockey ===
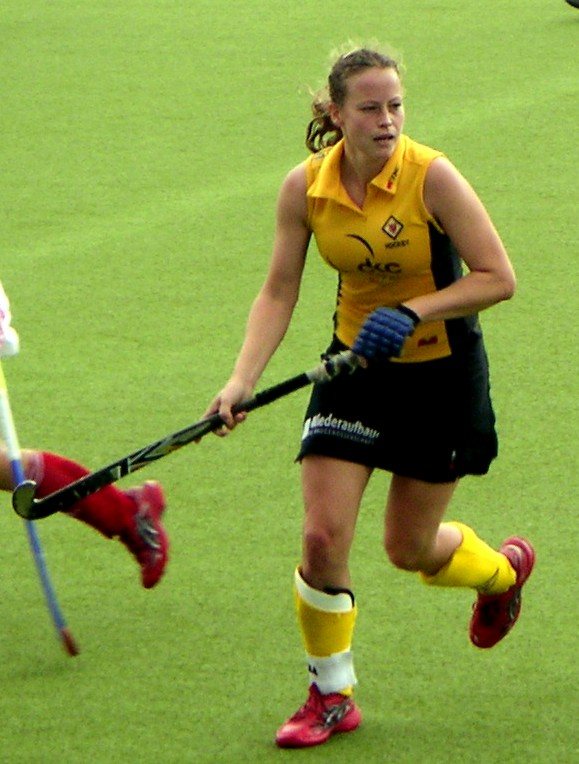
Anke Kühne

The field hockey department historically has been one of Eintracht Braunschweig's most successful sections. Eintracht's women's field hockey team has won numerous titles, mostly during the 1970s.

==== Honours ====
- Bundesliga:
  - Champions: 1965, 1969, 1974, 1975, 1976, 1978
  - Runners-up: 1964, 1977
- German women's championship (indoor):
  - Champions: 1973, 1974, 1975
  - Runners-up: 1970, 1978, 1983, 2003
- EuroHockey Club Champions Cup:
  - Runners-up: 1975, 1976, 1977

==== Notable players ====
The list includes current or former players of Eintracht Braunschweig who have won medals at major international tournaments, e.g. the Women's Hockey World Cup or the Summer Olympics.

- Tina Bachmann
- Bettina Blumenberg
- Ingrid Bruckert
- Nadine Ernsting-Krienke
- Karen Haude
- Carola Hoffmann
- Katrin Kauschke
- Anke Kühne
- Irina Kuhnt
- Heike Lätzsch
- Christel Lau
- Margit Müller
- Pia-Sophie Oldhafer
- Eva Pagels
- Gudrun Scholz
- Julia Zwehl

=== Ice hockey ===
Eintracht Braunschweig's ice hockey department was founded in 1981. After years in the lower divisions, the team played its first and only season in Germany's second division, then named 1. Liga, in 1997–1998. In 2000, the ice hockey section became independent as Eintracht Braunschweig Eissport e.V., and eventually dissolved in 2003.

=== Basketball ===
Eintracht Braunschweig's basketball department was founded in 1956. The club's women's team currently plays in the 2. Damen-Basketball-Bundesliga, the second tier of women's basketball in Germany.

== In popular culture ==
The German 2009 drama film 66/67: Fairplay Is Over (German: 66/67: Fairplay war gestern) tells the story of a group of Eintracht Braunschweig hooligans. The title is a reference to Eintracht's championship winning season 1966–67, as well as the name of the fictional supporters club the characters in the film belong to.

In 2008, the German jazz funk/hip hop band Jazzkantine produced a musical about Eintracht Braunschweig, titled Unser Eintracht, in cooperation with the Staatstheater Braunschweig.

== Bibliography ==
- Bläsig, Horst; Leppert, Alex (2010). Ein Roter Löwe auf der Brust – Die Geschichte von Eintracht Braunschweig. Göttingen: Die Werkstatt. ISBN 978-3-89533-675-1.
- Buchal, Andreas (2007). Eintracht Braunschweig vs Hannover 96. Über die Rivalität zweier Traditionsvereine. Wolfsburg: Verlag Günther Hempel. ISBN 978-3-87327-040-4.
- Döring, Jochen (1967). Spiele, Tore, Meisterschaft. Eintracht Braunschweig in der Bundesligasaison 1966/67. Braunschweig: Karl Pfannkuch-Verlag.
- Döring, Jochen (1995). Helmut, laß die Löwen raus! Triumphe und Tränen, Stars und Skandale. 100 Jahre Fußball, Eintracht Braunschweig. Braunschweig: Braunschweiger Zeitungsverlag.
- Gizler, Gerhard (2015). Es ist für's Vaterland, wenn's auch nur Spiel erscheint. Studien zur Geschichte von Eintracht Braunschweig in der NS-Zeit. Göttingen: Die Werkstatt. ISBN 978-3-7307-0243-7.
- Göttner, Christian (2007). Was geht, Eintracht Braunschweig? Deutscher Fußballmeister 1967. 67 Interviews mit legendären Fußballern. Kassel: Agon-Sportverlag. ISBN 978-3-89784-336-3.
- Graßhof, Heinz (1967). Eintracht Braunschweig. Porträt einer Bundesliga-Mannschaft. Braunschweig: Graff und Grenzland.
- Klingenberg, Axel (2013). 111 Gründe, Eintracht Braunschweig zu lieben. Eine Liebeserklärung an den großartigsten Fußballverein der Welt. Berlin: Schwarzkopf & Schwarzkopf Verlag. ISBN 978-3-8626-5280-8.
- Leppert, Alex (2016). Der Weg zum Titel. So wurde Eintracht Braunschweig Deutscher Fussballmeister 1967. Peine: Madsack Medien Ostniedersachsen. ISBN 978-3-00-055075-1.
- Peters, Stefan (1998). Eintracht Braunschweig. Die Chronik. Kassel: Agon-Sportverlag. ISBN 978-3-89609-152-9.
- Peters, Stefan; Göttner, Christian (2013). 100 Spiele Eintracht. Die emotionalsten Partien der Vereinsgeschichte von Eintracht Braunschweig. Göttingen: Die Werkstatt. ISBN 978-3-7307-0052-5.
- Pollmann, Ulrike (1995). In frischer Kraft und selbstbewußt... 100 Jahre Eintracht Braunschweig. Braunschweig: Verlag Michael Kuhle. ISBN 3-923696-72-8.
