= Walter Schmidt (footballer) =

German footballer (1937–2024)

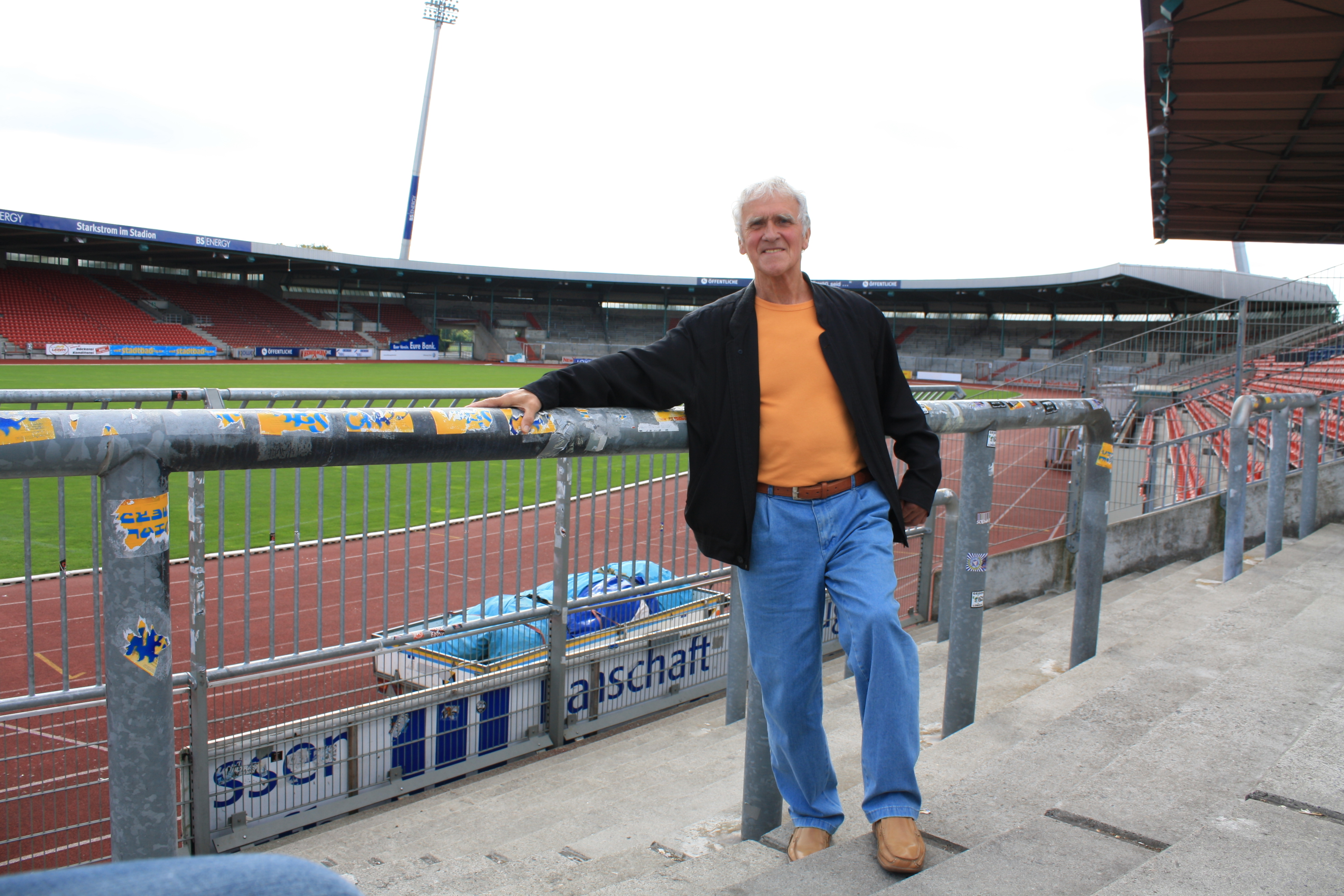
- Schmidt in 2009

Personal information
- Date of birth: 2 August 1937
- Place of birth: Bremerhaven, Gau Weser-Ems, Germany
- Date of death: 25 October 2024 (aged 87)
- Place of death: Braunschweig, Lower Saxony, Germany
- Height: 1.70 m (5 ft 7 in)
- Positions: Midfielder; defender

Youth career
- TuS Recke

Senior career*
Years	Team	Apps	(Gls)
1959–1970	Eintracht Braunschweig	299	(15)

International career
1965	West Germany B	1	(0)
- * Club domestic league appearances and goals

Walter Schmidt (2 August 1937 – 25 October 2024) was a German professional footballer who played as a midfielder or defender.

== Career ==
Walter Schmidt spent his entire professional career at Eintracht Braunschweig. He joined the club in 1959 and quickly became a regular in the Oberliga Nord, then the first tier of German football. In 1963 Eintracht Braunschweig became one of the founding members of the new nationwide Bundesliga. Schmidt, who missed only one league game between 1963 and 1967, was one of the key players of Eintracht's German championship winning team of 1967. However, an injury he suffered in 1969 forced Schmidt to retire from the game after missing the entire 1969–70 season.

== Post-retirement ==
In 1966, while still playing in the Bundesliga, Schmidt began his teacher education and later worked as a teacher for sports, mathematics and geography.

== Personal life and death ==
Schmidt was the father of musician DJ Pari. Schmidt died in Braunschweig on 25 October 2024, at the age of 87.

== Honours ==
Eintracht Braunschweig

- Bundesliga: 1966–67
