= Milton Griffiths =

Jamaican footballer (born 1975)

Personal information
- Full name: Milton Griffiths
- Date of birth: 30 April 1975
- Place of birth: Montego Bay, Jamaica
- Position: Midfielder

Senior career*
| Years | Team | Apps | (Gls) |
| 1995–1998 | William Carey Crusaders | | |
| 1999–2000 | Harbour View | | |
| 2000–2001 | Eintracht Braunschweig | 14 | (3) |
| 2001–2002 | Bull Bay | | |
| 2002–2004 | Harbour View | | |
| 2004–2006 | Bull Bay | | |
| 2006–2009 | Carib Cement | | |

International career
| 1999–2003 | Jamaica | 4 | (0) |
- * Club domestic league appearances and goals

Milton Griffiths (born 30 April 1975) is a retired Jamaican footballer. After playing for William Carey University in the US, as well as Harbour View in Jamaica, Griffiths joined German club Eintracht Braunschweig for the 2000-01 season. After one year in Germany Griffiths returned to Jamaica. He was also capped for the Jamaica national team.

== Honours ==
- National Premier League champion: 2000
- National A-League topscorer: 2002
