= Wolfgang Loos =

German footballer and manager

Personal information
- Full name: Wolfgang Loos
- Date of birth: 6 August 1955 (age 71)
- Place of birth: Essen, West Germany
- Position: Defender

Youth career
- Preußen Münster

Senior career*
Years	Team	Apps	(Gls)
1974–1977	Preußen Münster	24	(0)
1977–1980	VfL Osnabrück	34	(1)
1980–1985	ASC Schöppingen		

Managerial career
- ASC Schöppingen (assistant)
- 2004: Eintracht Braunschweig (caretaker)
- * Club domestic league appearances and goals

Wolfgang Loos (born 6 August 1955) is a German retired footballer who played as a defender. He spent six seasons in the 2. Bundesliga with Preußen Münster and VfL Osnabrück.

Since retiring as a player, Loos has worked in various functions for a number of German football clubs, mostly as business manager or executive director, namely for VfL Osnabrück (1986–1992), Dynamo Dresden (1993), 1. FC Köln (1993–2002), Eintracht Braunschweig (2002–2006), 1. FC Saarbrücken (2007–2008), TuS Koblenz (2008–2011), and RB Leipzig (2011–2012). At Eintracht Braunschweig, he also took over as caretaker manager for a short time in 2004.
