= Osaka Monaurail =

Japanese funk band

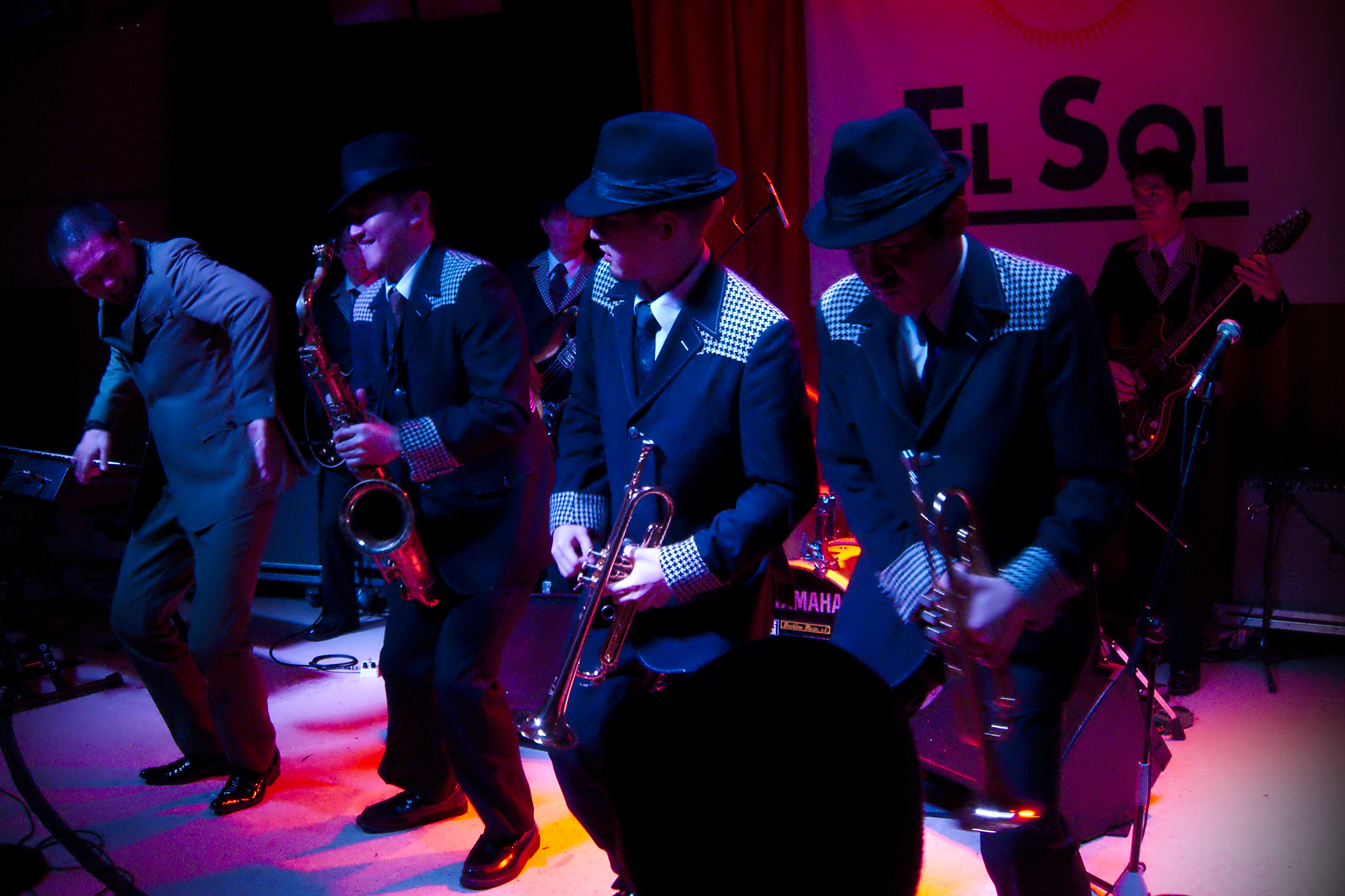
- Osaka Monaurail at Sala El Sol, Madrid, Spain, in April 2012

Background information
- Origin: Osaka, Japan
- Genres: Funk
- Years active: 1992–present
- Members: Ryo Nakata; Kentaro Yamagata; Shimon Mukai; Dan Hayami; Yuichi Ikeda; Soki Kimura
- Past members: Yohchi Masago; Katsutoshi Hiraishi; Dai Nakamura
- Website: www.osakamonaurail.com

Osaka Monaurail (オーサカ-モノレール, Ōsaka Monorēru) is a Japanese funk band, formed in Osaka, Japan. It has been active since 1992. The band is now based in Tokyo, Japan.

== Band members ==
Current

- Ryo Nakata, vocal & keyboards
- Kentaro Yamagata, trumpet
- Taihei Awaji, trumpet
- Shimon Mukai, tenor saxophone
- Dan Hayami, guitar
- Yuichi Ikeda, guitar
- Tsuyoshi Ouchi, bass guitar
- Soki Kimura, drums

Former

- Yohchi Masago, trumpet
- Katsutoshi Hiraishi, trombone
- Dai Nakamura, bass guitar

== Discography ==
=== Albums ===
- What It Is – What It Was (RD Records, 2000)
- Rumble'n Struggle (RD Records, 2001)
- Thankful (RD Records, 2004)
- Eyewitness to the Live in Heavy Funk System (RD Records, 2005)
- I Am What I Am by Marva Whitney Produced by Osaka Monaurail (Shout!/P-Vine, 2006)
- Reality for the People (P-Vine, 2006)
- Amen, Brother (and other Funk instrumentals) (Unique Records, 2007) a.k.a. Introducing Undercover Express (Japanese title on P-Vine)
- Live in Spain (Shout!/P-Vine, 2009)
- State of the World (King Records, 2011)
- Riptide (Unique Records/Shout!, 2014)

=== Singles ===
- "New Type Thing" (pts.1&2) (RD Records, Jan., 2001)
- "Down and Out" (pts.1&2) (RD Records, Jan., 2001)
- "Just Bein' Free" (pts.1&2) (RD Records, Jun., 2001)
- "Mind Power (pts.1&2)" (RD Records, Nov., 2004)
- "Double-Up, Now" b/w "Groovy, Groovy, Groovy (Pt.2)" (RD Records, Nov., 2004)
- "Hot Pants Road" (pt.1) b/w "Pick Up the Pieces One By One" (pt.2) (RD Records, Apr., 2005)
- "Pick Up The Pieces One By One" (pt.1) b/w "Hot Pants Road" (pt.2) (RD Records, Apr., 2005)
- "I Am What I Am" (pts.1&2) by Martha Whitney with Osaka Monaurail (RD Records, Jun., 2006)
- "Soulsisters (of the World Unite)" b/w "It's Her Thing" by Martha Whitney with Osaka Monaurail (Shout!, Mar., 2007)
- "Quicksand" b/w "Ceora" (Shout!, Apr., 2007)
- "We Got One (A Show)" (Our Label, 2007)* "Signed, Sealed and Delivered - I'm Yours" b/w "Supershine #9" (Our Label, 2009)
- "Tighten Up" b/w "Soulful Strut" (Unique Records, 2009)
- "Hung Up" (Unique Records, 2009)
- "No Trouble On The Mountain" (featuring Shirley Davis) b/w "The Archipelago" (Unique Records, 2011)
