= Ronnie Worm =

German footballer

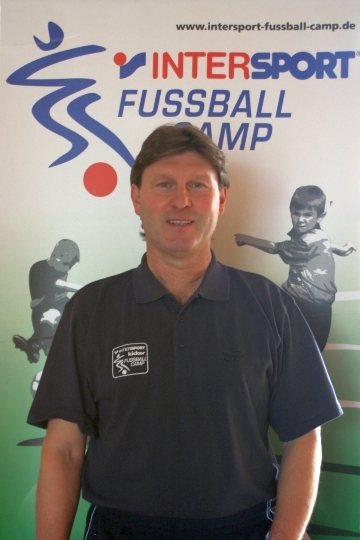
- Worm in 2006

Personal information
- Full name: Ronald Worm
- Date of birth: 7 October 1953 (age 73)
- Place of birth: Duisburg, West Germany
- Height: 1.79 m (5 ft 10 in)
- Position: Striker

Youth career
- –1971: MSV Duisburg

Senior career*
Years	Team	Apps	(Gls)
1971–1979	MSV Duisburg	231	(71)
1979–1987	Eintracht Braunschweig	244	(92)
Total		475	(163)

International career
1969–1970	West Germany U15		
1970–1972	West Germany U18		
1972	West Germany Olympic		
1973	West Germany U23	3	(1)
1974–1981	West Germany B	12	(5)
1975–1978	West Germany	7	(5)

Managerial career
- 1993–1994: Hertha BSC (assistant)
- 1996–1997: FC Sachsen Leipzig (assistant)
- 2000–2001: TSV Havelse
- 2015–: Eintracht Braunschweig (women)
Medal record
MSV Duisburg
Runner-up	DFB-Pokal	1975
West Germany
Runner-up	European Championship	1976
- * Club domestic league appearances and goals

Ronald "Ronnie" Worm (born 7 October 1953) is a German former international footballer who played as a striker.

== Club career ==
Worm began his career at his hometown club MSV Duisburg, for which he made 231 appearances in the Bundesliga between 1971 and 1979, scoring 71 goals. In 1979, he was signed by Eintracht Braunschweig for a transfer fee of 1 million Deutsche Mark to replace Harald Nickel, who had just left the club for Borussia Mönchengladbach. He went on to play for Braunschweig until he retired from the game in 1987 after not receiving an offer for a new contract from the club.

== International career ==
Worm was capped seven times for the West Germany national team between 1975 and 1978, scoring five goals. He was part of the West German squads for the 1976 Euro and 1978 World Cup, but did not play in either tournament.

Worm also competed for West Germany at the 1972 Summer Olympics.

== Coaching career ==
From 2015, Worm managed Eintracht Braunschweig's women's team.

== Career statistics ==
Scores and results list West Germany's goal tally first, score column indicates score after each Worm goal. Germany's goal tally first:

List of international goals scored by Ronnie Worm
No.	Date	Venue	Opponent	Score	Result	Competition
1	20 December 1975	BJK İnönü Stadium, Istanbul, Turkey	Turkey	3–0	5–0	Friendly
2	20 December 1975	BJK İnönü Stadium, Istanbul, Turkey	Turkey	4–0	5–0	Friendly
3	28 February 1976	Westfalenstadion, Dortmund, West Germany	Malta	1–0	8–0	UEFA Euro 1976 qualifying
4	28 February 1976	Westfalenstadion, Dortmund, West Germany	Malta	2–0	8–0	UEFA Euro 1976 qualifying
5	22 February 1978	Olympic Stadium, Munich, West Germany	England	1–1	2–1	Friendly
