= Gudrun Scholz =

German field hockey player

Personal information
- Born: 14 January 1940 (age 86) Braunschweig, German Reich

Sport
- Sport: Field hockey
Senior career
Years	Team	Caps	Goals
–	Eintracht Braunschweig	-	-
National team
Years	Team	Caps	Goals
1963–1976	West Germany	30	-
Medal record
Women's field hockey
Representing West Germany
Women's Hockey World Cup
Gold medal – first place	1976 West Berlin	Team
Indoor Nations Championship
Gold medal – first place	1975 Arras	Team

Gudrun Scholz née Scheller (born 14 January 1940) is a retired German field hockey player.

Scholz joined Eintracht Braunschweig in 1952, initially competing as a long jumper. In 1959 she set a German record at 6.22m. In 1961, Scholz placed third in the long jump competition at the German Athletics Championships.

In the early 1960s, she joined Eintracht Braunschweig's field hockey team. With her club, she won nine German championship titles. She also played 30 games in total for the West German national team.

With West Germany, Scholz won the 1976 Women's Hockey World Cup. She scored both goals in the final, a 2–0 win over Argentina.

In 1977, Scholz was awarded the Silbernes Lorbeerblatt and the Paul-Reinberg-Plakette, the highest award of the German Hockey Federation. In 1988, she was inducted into the hall of fame of the Lower Saxon Institute of Sports History.
