= Margit Müller =

German field hockey player

Personal information
- Born: 31 October 1952 (age 73) Oebisfelde, East Germany

Sport
- Sport: Field hockey
Senior career
Years	Team	Caps	Goals
1960–1966	VfL Wolfsburg	-	-
1966–1978	Eintracht Braunschweig	-	-
1978–	VfL Wolfsburg	-	-
National team
Years	Team	Caps	Goals
1970–1980	West Germany	100	-
Medal record
Women's field hockey
Representing West Germany
Women's Hockey World Cup
Bronze medal – third place	1974 Mandelieu	Team
Gold medal – first place	1976 West Berlin	Team
Silver medal – second place	1978 Madrid	Team
IFWHA World Championship
Silver medal – second place	1971 Auckland	Team
Silver medal – second place	1979 Vancouver	Team
Indoor Nations Championship
Gold medal – first place	1975 Arras	Team
Gold medal – first place	1977 Brussels	Team

Margit Meissner née Müller (born 31 October 1952) is a retired German field hockey player.

Müller played for VfL Wolfsburg and Eintracht Braunschweig. With Braunschweig, she won eight German championship titles. She also played 100 games in total for the German national team.

With West Germany, Müller won the 1976 Women's Hockey World Cup. She was also called up to the West German squad for the 1980 Summer Olympics. However, due to the 1980 Summer Olympics boycott, the West German team ultimately didn't enter the tournament.

In 1974, Müller was awarded the Silbernes Lorbeerblatt. In 1988, she was inducted into the hall of fame of the Lower Saxon Institute of Sports History.
