= Uli Maslo =

German footballer and manager

Personal information
- Date of birth: 6 July 1938 (age 88)
- Place of birth: Wattenscheid, Germany
- Position: Midfielder

Senior career*
Years	Team	Apps	(Gls)
–1959	SG Wattenscheid 09		
1959–1962	Rot-Weiss Essen		
1962–1968	RCH Heemstede		

Managerial career
- 1972–1977: Schalke 04 U19
- 1977–1978: Schalke 04
- 1979: Borussia Dortmund
- 1979–1983: Eintracht Braunschweig
- 1983: Borussia Dortmund
- 1985–1988: Bahrain Riffa Club
- 1988–1990: Qatar SC
- 1990: Qatar
- 1990–1992: Qatar SC
- 1992–1993: Eintracht Braunschweig
- 1993–1994: Bahrain Riffa Club
- 1994–1997: FC St. Pauli
- 1997–1998: Fortuna Düsseldorf
- 2003: Al-Tai
- * Club domestic league appearances and goals

Uli Maslo (born 6 July 1938) is a German former football player and manager.

== Career ==
Maslo joined Dutch Tweede Divisie club RCH Heemstede from Rot-Weiss Essen in 1962 and played for the club till 1968.
