= Helmuth Johannsen =

German football manager (1920–1998)

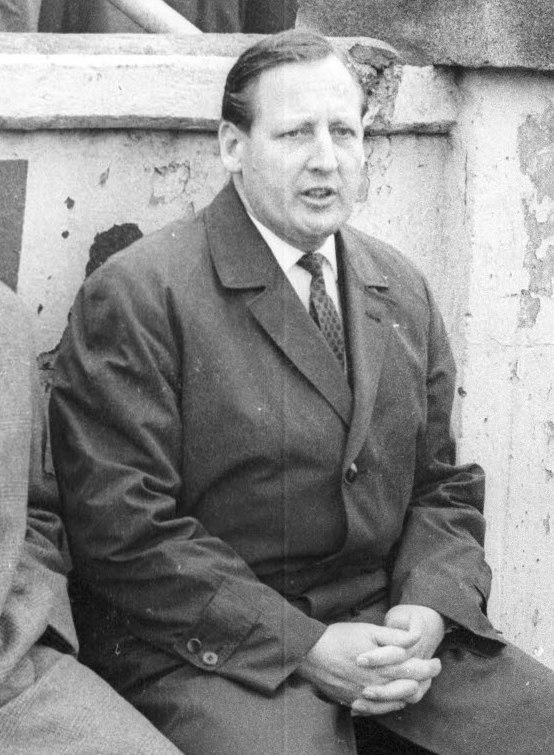
- Johannsen managing Braunschweig in 1963

Personal information
- Date of birth: 27 February 1920
- Place of birth: Hamburg, Germany
- Date of death: 3 November 1998 (aged 78)
- Place of death: Hamburg, Germany

Youth career
- FC St. Pauli

Senior career*
Years	Team	Apps	(Gls)
- FC St. Pauli

Managerial career
- 1950–1954: TuS Bremerhaven 93
- 1954–1961: Holstein Kiel
- 1961–1963: 1. FC Saarbrücken
- 1963–1970: Eintracht Braunschweig
- 1970–1971: Hannover 96
- 1972–1975: SV Röchling Völklingen
- 1975–1976: Tennis Borussia Berlin
- 1976–1979: Grasshoppers
- 1979–1981: VfL Bochum
- 1981–1985: St. Gallen
- * Club domestic league appearances and goals

Helmuth Johannsen (27 February 1920 – 3 November 1998) was a German professional football player and manager.

Johannsen played for FC St. Pauli, a club which he also served as vice-president for a year from 1987 to 1988, but a war injury forced him to give up his playing career early. After World War II he went on to become a manager, most notably leading Eintracht Braunschweig to a surprising Bundesliga championship in 1966–67.

From early May to the end of June 1965 he spent a few weeks on loan from Braunschweig at Holstein Kiel taking the champions of the northern division of the then national second tier Regionalliga, through the matches of the promotion series for the Bundesliga, but finishing only third in a pool of four teams, behind Borussia Mönchengladbach around their young stars Günter Netzer and Jupp Heynckes, and SSV Reutlingen from the state of Baden-Württemberg.

He also worked in Switzerland, winning the Swiss championship in 1978 with Grasshopper Club Zürich, and also reaching the semi-finals of the UEFA Cup the same year.

== Honours ==
Eintracht Braunschweig

- Bundesliga: 1967

Grasshoppers

- Swiss Nationalliga A: 1978

Individual

- Swiss Manager of the Year: 1984
