= 1977–78 Tennis Borussia Berlin season =

Tennis Borussia Berlin
1977–78 season
- Manager: Rudi Faßnacht (until 31 December 1977); Klaus Basikow (from 1 January 1978)
- Stadium: Mommsenstadion
- 2. Bundesliga (Nord): 10th
- DFB-Pokal: Second Round
- Top goalscorer: League: Heinz-Josef Kehr (18); All: Heinz-Josef Kehr (18)
- Highest home attendance: 5,400 (vs. Hannover 96)
- Lowest home attendance: 1,200 (vs. Rot-Weiß Lüdenscheid)
- Average home league attendance: 3,337

The 1977–78 season was the second time Tennis Borussia Berlin played in the 2. Bundesliga, the second highest tier of the German football league system. After 38 league games, Tennis Borussia finished 10th in the division. The club reached the second round of the DFB-Pokal; losing 3–1 at home to SC Westfalia Herne. Heinz-Josef Kehr scored 18 of the club's 58 league goals.

== 1977–78 Tennis Borussia Berlin squad ==
No.	Pos.	Nation	Player
—	GK	FRG	Gerhard Welz
—	DF	FRG	Hans-Jürgen Baake
—	DF	FRG	Klaus-Peter Hanisch
—	DF	FRG	Dieter Hochheimer
—	DF	FRG	Hans-Georg Kraus
—	DF	FRG	Ernst Savkovic
—	DF	FRG	Reinhard Schmitz
—	DF	FRG	Hans Sprenger
—	MF	FRG	Winfried Berkemeier
—	MF	DEN	Allan Hansen

No.	Pos.	Nation	Player
—	MF	FRG	Herbert Heidenreich (from 1 October 1977)
—	MF	FRG	Lothar Schneider
—	MF	FRG	Jürgen Schulz
—	MF	FRG	Michael Zimmer
—	FW	FRG	Detlef Bruckhoff
—	FW	FRG	Heinz-Josef Kehr
—	FW	FRG	Michael Rührmund
—	FW	FRG	Winfried Stradt
—	FW	FRG	Karlheinz Subklewe (until 30 September 1977)

== 1977–78 fixtures ==
29 July 1977 DFB-Pokal – R1	Hannover 96	0 – 2	Tennis Borussia Berlin	Niedersachsenstadion, Hanover
		Report	Stradt 59' (pen.); Baake 87'	Attendance: 7,000; Referee: Eckhard Jensen (Kiel)

6 August 1977 2. Bundesliga	FC Bayer 05 Uerdingen	2 – 0	Tennis Borussia Berlin	Grotenburg-Stadion, Krefeld
15:00	Raschid 26'; Wloka 54' (pen.)	Report	Bruckhoff (yellow card)	Attendance: 7,000; Referee: Werner Schütte (Gelsenkirchen)

12 August 1977 2. Bundesliga	Tennis Borussia Berlin	2 – 2	Alemannia Aachen	Mommsenstadion, Berlin
19:00	Kehr 4'; Berkemeier 89'	Report	Montañés 16'; Breuer 21'	Attendance: 5,200; Referee: Kurt-Dieter Roth

16 August 1977 2. Bundesliga	VfL Osnabrück	0 – 0	Tennis Borussia Berlin	Stadion an der Bremer Brücke, Osnabrück
19:30		Report	Stradt (red card) 66'	Attendance: 5,000; Referee: Günther Risse (Hattingen)

20 August 1977 DFB-Pokal – R2	Tennis Borussia Berlin	1 – 3	SC Westfalia Herne	Mommsenstadion, Berlin
	Hochheimer 82'	Report	Bals 17', 59'; Ochmann 67'	Attendance: 3,500; Referee: Volker Roth (Salzgitter)

26 August 1977 2. Bundesliga	Tennis Borussia Berlin	3 – 2	SC Herford	Mommsenstadion, Berlin
19:00	Hochheimer 67'; Kehr 69', 83'	Report	Pallaks 31'; Flüshöh 89'; Wehmeier (yellow card)	Attendance: 2,800; Referee: Detlef Eggers (Hamburg)

30 August 1977 2. Bundesliga	Tennis Borussia Berlin	3 – 0	SG Union Solingen	Mommsenstadion, Berlin
19:30	Stradt 27'; Kehr 35'; Schneider 61'; Sprenger (yellow card)	Report	Feiten (yellow card) Evenkamp (yellow card); Jonas (red card) 90'	Attendance: 5,000; Referee: Willi Kornrumpf (Südwinsen)

2 September 1977 2. Bundesliga	SC Preußen Münster	0 – 0	Tennis Borussia Berlin	Preußenstadion, Münster
19:00	Petkovic (yellow card)	Report	Schmitz (yellow card)	Attendance: 20,000; Referee: Eckhard Jensen (Kiel)

9 September 1977 2. Bundesliga	Tennis Borussia Berlin	3 – 2	Hannover 96	Mommsenstadion, Berlin
19:00	Stradt 8'; Hochheimer 51'; Schulz 88'; Schmitz (yellow card)	Report	Kulik 36'; Lüttges 73'	Attendance: 5,400; Referee: Helmut Bartnick (Kiel)

16 September 1977 2. Bundesliga	Schwarz-Weiß Essen	2 – 2	Tennis Borussia Berlin	Uhlenkrugstadion, Essen
19:00	Priewe 29', 59' (pen.); Klausmann (yellow card)	Report	Hochheimer 55'; Stradt 79'; Schmitz (yellow card)	Attendance: 3,000; Referee: Günther Reichmann (Gelsenkirchen)

23 September 1977 2. Bundesliga	Tennis Borussia Berlin	2 – 1	SC Westfalia Herne	Mommsenstadion, Berlin
19:00	Baake 15'; Kehr 90'; Berkemeier (yellow card) Sprenger (yellow card)	Report	Ochmann 76'; Bals (yellow card) Sinnigen (yellow card)	Attendance: 5,000; Referee: Udo Horeis (Hamburg)

1 October 1977 2. Bundesliga	Arminia Bielefeld	4 – 1	Tennis Borussia Berlin	Stadion Alm, Bielefeld
15:00	Moors 33'; Schröder 34'; Peitsch 65'; Schilling 78'; Sackewitz (yellow card) Moors (yellow card)	Report	Schneider 20'; Kehr (yellow card) Baake (yellow card) Berkemeier (yellow card); Savkovic (red card) 70'	Attendance: 10,000; Referee: Werner Burgers (Essen)

15 October 1977 2. Bundesliga	Tennis Borussia Berlin	1 – 0	SG Wattenscheid 09	Mommsenstadion, Berlin
15:00	Klimke 47' (o.g.)	Report	Bruns (yellow card)	Attendance: 5,000; Referee: Karl-Josef Assenmacher (Fischenich)

21 October 1977 2. Bundesliga	Wuppertaler SV	1 – 1	Tennis Borussia Berlin	Stadion am Zoo, Wuppertal
19:00	Pröpper 90'; Götz (yellow card)	Report	Schulz 35'; Sprenger (yellow card)	Referee: Gerhard Kaiser (Bremen)

29 October 1977 2. Bundesliga	Tennis Borussia Berlin	1 – 3	SC Fortuna Köln	Mommsenstadion, Berlin
15:00	Baake 64'	Report	Albert 57'; Baylón 61'; Campbell 68'	Attendance: 5,000; Referee: Gerhard Boe (Uelzen)

4 November 1977 2. Bundesliga	OSC Bremerhaven	3 – 3	Tennis Borussia Berlin	Nordseestadion, Bremerhaven
19:00	Ohling 10'; Trenke 52'; Rogoznica 75'	Report	Stradt 39', 45', 65'; Hochheimer (yellow card)	Attendance: 4,000; Referee: Hans-Heinrich Barnick (Schenefeld)

12 November 1977 2. Bundesliga	Tennis Borussia Berlin	1 – 0	Bayer 04 Leverkusen	Mommsenstadion, Berlin
15:00	Kehr 79'; Sprenger (yellow card)	Report	Elfering (yellow card)	Attendance: 2,200; Referee: Hans-Jürgen Kopka (Hamburg)

26 November 1977 2. Bundesliga	Rot-Weiß Lüdenscheid	2 – 1	Tennis Borussia Berlin	Nattenberg-Stadion, Lüdenscheid
15:00	Jürgens 5'; Offermanns 48'	Report	Hochheimer 86'	Attendance: 6,000; Referee: Rüdiger Wuttke (Oberhausen)

3 December 1977 2. Bundesliga	Tennis Borussia Berlin	6 – 0	SV Arminia Hannover	Mommsenstadion, Berlin
15:00	Kehr 7', 36', 56'; Schneider 52', 87'; Berkemeier 55'; Baake (yellow card)	Report	Krüger (yellow card)	Attendance: 3,800; Referee: Max Milkert (Dortmund)

10 December 1977 2. Bundesliga	Rot-Weiss Essen	4 – 3	Tennis Borussia Berlin	Georg-Melches-Stadion, Essen
15:00	Hrubesch 23', 63', 82'; Ehmke 45'	Report	Stradt 46', 49'; Kehr 71'	Attendance: 7,000; Referee: Friedrich Retzmann (Pinneberg)

17 December 1977 2. Bundesliga	Tennis Borussia Berlin	1 – 0	1. FC Bocholt	Mommsenstadion, Berlin
15:00	Kehr 4'; Welz (yellow card)	Report	Philipp (yellow card) Stieber (yellow card)	Attendance: 3,300; Referee: Hans-Joachim Filipiak (Hanover)

6 January 1978 2. Bundesliga	Tennis Borussia Berlin	1 – 1	FC Bayer 05 Uerdingen	Mommsenstadion, Berlin
19:00	Kehr 9'	Report	Funkel 85'; Götz (yellow card) Brinkmann (yellow card)	Attendance: 3,500; Referee: Klaus-Peter Zittrich (Isernhagen)

14 January 1978 2. Bundesliga	Alemannia Aachen	1 – 4	Tennis Borussia Berlin	Tivoli, Aachen
15:00	Reuter 59' (pen.); Glock (yellow card)	Report	Heidenreich 12', 84'; Stradt 17', 90'; Stradt (yellow card) Schulz (yellow card) Schmitz (yellow card) Kraus (yellow card); Kehr (red card) 59'	Attendance: 5,000; Referee: Manfred Uhlig (Dortmund)

20 January 1976 2. Bundesliga	Tennis Borussia Berlin	0 – 0	VfL Osnabrück	Mommsenstadion, Berlin
19:00	Schmitz (yellow card)	Report	Wiesler (yellow card)	Attendance: 3,600; Referee: Manfred Wichmann (Gelsenkirchen)

28 January 1978 2. Bundesliga	SC Herford	1 – 1	Tennis Borussia Berlin	Friedrich-Ludwig-Jahn-Stadion, Herford
15:00	Wehmeier 86'	Report	Stradt 6'; Sprenger (yellow card)	Attendance: 4,500; Referee: Hans-Gerd Kohnen (Hückelhoven)

1 February 1978 2. Bundesliga	SG Union Solingen	2 – 0	Tennis Borussia Berlin	Stadion am Hermann-Löns-Weg, Solingen
19:30	Höfer 55' (pen.); Lenz 56'	Report		Attendance: 4,000; Referee: Wolfgang Engelmann (Hamburg)

11 February 1978 2. Bundesliga	Tennis Borussia Berlin	1 – 2	SC Preußen Münster	Mommsenstadion, Berlin
15:00	Berkemeier 22'; Schneider (yellow card)	Report	Kaczor 31', 56'	Attendance: 2,700; Referee: Walter Eschweiler (Euskirchen)

18 February 1978 2. Bundesliga	Hannover 96	1 – 0	Tennis Borussia Berlin	Niedersachsenstadion, Hanover
15:00	Pagelsdorf 82'; Milewski (yellow card)	Report	Kraus (yellow card)	Attendance: 3,500; Referee: Hans Wahmann (Gelsenkirchen)

3 March 1978 2. Bundesliga	SC Westfalia Herne	2 – 0	Tennis Borussia Berlin	Stadion am Schloss Strünkede, Herne
19:00	Bals 43'; Sinnigen 58'	Report	Schulz (yellow card) Kehr (yellow card)	Attendance: 3,000; Referee: Walter Horstmann (Hildesheim)

10 March 1978 2. Bundesliga	Tennis Borussia Berlin	3 – 2	Arminia Bielefeld	Mommsenstadion, Berlin
19:00	Kehr 6', 57'; Stradt 52'; Schneider (yellow card)	Report	Schröder 36'; Sackewitz 44'; Sackewitz (yellow card) Cryns (yellow card) Schilling (yellow card)	Attendance: 2,100; Referee: Volker Roth (Salzgitter)

17 March 1978 2. Bundesliga	SG Wattenscheid 09	4 – 2	Tennis Borussia Berlin	Lohrheidestadion, Bochum–Wattenscheid
19:00	Babington 49'; Bruns 63' (pen.), 78'; Hammes 73'	Report	Heidenreich 10', 86'	Attendance: 800; Referee: Hans-Joachim Filipiak (Hanover)

24 March 1978 2. Bundesliga	Tennis Borussia Berlin	1 – 0	Schwarz-Weiß Essen	Mommsenstadion, Berlin
19:00	Kehr 72'; Baake (yellow card) Welz (yellow card) Kehr (yellow card) Heidenreich (yellow card)	Report	Nieswandt (yellow card) Heise (yellow card)	Attendance: 1,800; Referee: Gerd Lins (Elmschenhagen)

1 April 1978 2. Bundesliga	Tennis Borussia Berlin	0 – 0	Wuppertaler SV	Mommsenstadion, Berlin
15:00		Report		Attendance: 2,300; Referee: Dieter Gabriel (Springe)

7 April 1978 2. Bundesliga	SC Fortuna Köln	2 – 1	Tennis Borussia Berlin	Müngersdorfer Stadion, Cologne
19:00	Müller 45'; Graul 62'; Mödrath (yellow card)	Report	Berkemeier 44'; Kraus (yellow card) Hochheimer (yellow card)	Attendance: 5,000; Referee: Klaus Broska (Gelsenkirchen)

21 April 1978 2. Bundesliga	Tennis Borussia Berlin	3 – 1	OSC Bremerhaven	Mommsenstadion, Berlin
19:00	Stradt 50'; Kehr 82'; Berkemeier 85'; Kehr (yellow card)	Report	Rogoznica 68'; Freund (yellow card) Rogoznica (yellow card)	Attendance: 1,500; Referee: Armin Möller (Bochum)

28 April 1978 2. Bundesliga	Bayer 04 Leverkusen	2 – 1	Tennis Borussia Berlin	Ulrich-Haberland-Stadion, Leverkusen
19:00	Herzog 49'; Kehr 57' (o.g.); Scheinert (yellow card) Gelsdorf (yellow card)	Report	Kehr 35'	Attendance: 1,000; Referee: Rüdiger Wuttke (Oberhausen)

5 May 1978 2. Bundesliga	Tennis Borussia Berlin	1 – 1	Rot-Weiß Lüdenscheid	Mommsenstadion, Berlin
19:00	Hochheimer 20'; Sprenger (yellow card); Kehr (yellow card)	Report	Clute-Simon 42'; Scheermann (yellow card)	Attendance: 1,200; Referee: Hans-Werner Leyding

12 May 1978 2. Bundesliga	SV Arminia Hannover	1 – 1	Tennis Borussia Berlin	Stadion am Bischofsholer Damm, Hanover
19:00	Wallek 28'	Report	Kehr 61'; Kraus (red card) 44'	Attendance: 2,500; Referee: Winfried Groß (Goch)

20 May 1978 2. Bundesliga	Tennis Borussia Berlin	1 – 2	Rot-Weiss Essen	Mommsenstadion, Berlin
15:00	Schmitz 37'	Report	Mill 23'; Hrubesch 33'	Attendance: 2,000; Referee: Hans-Heinrich Barnick (Schenefeld)

27 May 1978 2. Bundesliga	1. FC Bocholt	4 – 3	Tennis Borussia Berlin	Stadion am Hünting, Osnabrück
15:00	Runge 69', 81'; Montelett 75'; Nabrotzki 86'	Report	Stradt 21', 52', 78'; Heidenreich (yellow card)	Attendance: 4,000; Referee: Helmut Bartnick (Kiel)

== Player statistics ==
Pos	Player	Apps	Goals	Apps	Goals	Apps	Goals
Pos	Player	2. Bundesliga		DFB-Pokal		Total	
DF	(West Germany) Hans-Jürgen Baake	38	2	2	1	40	3
MF	(West Germany) Winfried Berkemeier	34	5	2	0	36	5
FW	(West Germany) Detlef Bruckhoff	13	0	1	0	14	0
DF	(West Germany) Klaus-Peter Hanisch	1	0	0	0	1	0
MF	(Denmark) Allan Hansen	13	0	0	0	13	0
MF	(West Germany) Herbert Heidenreich	23	4	0	0	23	4
DF	(West Germany) Dieter Hochheimer	38	5	2	1	40	6
FW	(West Germany) Heinz-Josef Kehr	32	18	2	0	34	18
DF	(West Germany) Hans-Georg Kraus	20	0	0	0	20	0
FW	(West Germany) Michael Rührmund	1	0	0	0	1	0
DF	(West Germany) Ernst Savkovic	13	0	1	0	14	0
DF	(West Germany) Reinhard Schmitz	37	1	2	0	39	1
MF	(West Germany) Lothar Schneider	35	4	2	0	37	4
MF	(West Germany) Jürgen Schulz	38	2	2	0	40	2
DF	(West Germany) Hans Sprenger	34	0	2	0	36	0
FW	(West Germany) Winfried Stradt	35	16	2	1	37	17
FW	(West Germany) Karlheinz Subklewe	4	0	1	0	5	0
GK	(West Germany) Gerhard Welz	38	0	2	0	40	0
MF	(West Germany) Michael Zimmer	17	0	1	0	18	0

== Final league position – 10th ==
1977–78 2. Bundesliga Nord: extract from the final league table
Pos	Team	Pld	W	D	L	GF	GA	GD	Points
1	Arminia Bielefeld (C)	38	23	5	10	74	40	+34	51:25
9	SG Union Solingen	38	13	13	12	60	60	0	39:37
10	Tennis Borussia Berlin	38	12	12	14	58	57	+1	36:40
11	Wuppertaler SV	38	12	12	14	56	59	–3	36:40
20	Schwarz-Weiß Essen (R)	38	4	11	23	45	92	–47	19:57
