= List of 2. Bundesliga top scorers =

This is the list of 2. Bundesliga top scorers season by season.

The 2. Bundesliga was established in 1974 in two regional divisions and began play in August 1974 with a game between 1. FC Saarbrücken and Darmstadt 98, with Nikolaus Semlitsch of Saarbrücken scoring the first goal of the new league. Bernd Hoffmann of Karlsruher SC and Volker Graul of Arminia Bielefeld became the first top scorers of the southern and northern divisions. From 1981, with the exception of the 1991–92 season, the league operated as a single division.

Horst Hrubesch holds the record for the highest number of goals in a season, with 41 for Rot-Weiss Essen in the 1977–78 season of the northern division. The record holder for the single-division era is Rudi Völler of 1860 Munich in 1981–82, with 37 goals. The only player to finish top scorer four times was Simon Terodde, doing so with VfL Bochum, VfB Stuttgart, 1. FC Köln and Schalke 04. Emanuel Günther was top scorer three times, all with Karlsruher SC (including one shared scoring title). Siegfried Reich, Angelo Vier and Artur Wichniarek (the last shared once) won two titles, with Reich's achievements particularly notable as they occurred seven years apart. Arminia Bielefeld holds the record for top scorers for clubs, having provided the league's top scorer on six occasions. The most career goals in the league were scored by Terodde, with 172.

== Top scorers ==
The league's top scorers:

Top scorers
Season	Top scorer(s)	Club	Goals
1974–75	(Germany) Bernd Hoffmann (South) (Germany) Volker Graul (North)	Karlsruher SC Arminia Bielefeld	25 30
1975–76	(Germany) Karl-Heinz Granitza (South) (Germany) Norbert Stolzenburg (North)	Röchling Völklingen Tennis Borussia Berlin	29 27
1976–77	(Germany) Lothar Emmerich (South) (Germany) Franz Gerber (North)	Würzburger FV FC St. Pauli	24 27
1977–78	(Germany) Emanuel Günther (South) (Germany) Horst Hrubesch (North)	Karlsruher SC Rot-Weiss Essen	27 41
1978–79	(Germany) Eduard Kirschner (South) (Germany) Karl-Heinz Mödrath (North)	SpVgg Fürth Fortuna Köln	28 28
1979–80	(Germany) Emanuel Günther (South) (Germany) Christian Sackewitz (North)	Karlsruher SC Arminia Bielefeld	28 35
1980–81	(Germany) Horst Neumann (South) (Germany) Frank Mill (North)	SV Darmstadt 98 Rot-Weiss Essen	27 40
1981–82	(Germany) Rudi Völler	1860 Munich	37
1982–83	(Germany) Dieter Schatzschneider	Fortuna Köln	31
1983–84	(Germany) Roland Wohlfarth (Germany) Emanuel Günther	MSV Duisburg Karlsruher SC	30
1984–85	(Germany) Manfred Burgsmüller	Rot-Weiß Oberhausen	29
1985–86	(Germany) Leo Bunk	Blau-Weiß 90 Berlin	26
1986–87	(Germany) Siegfried Reich	Hannover 96	26
1987–88	(Senegal) Souleyman Sané	SC Freiburg	21
1988–89	(Germany) Sven Demandt	Fortuna Düsseldorf	35
1989–90	(Germany) Maurice Banach	Wattenscheid 09	22
1990–91	(Germany) Michael Tönnies	MSV Duisburg	29
1991–92	(Germany) Michael Preetz (South) (Czech Republic) Radek Drulák (North)	1. FC Saarbrücken; VfB Oldenburg	17 21
1992–93	(Germany) Siegfried Reich	VfL Wolfsburg	27
1993–94	(Germany) Uwe Wegmann	VfL Bochum	22
1994–95	(Germany) Jürgen Rische	VfB Leipzig	17
1995–96	(Germany) Fritz Walter	Arminia Bielefeld	21
1996–97	(Germany) Angelo Vier	Rot-Weiss Essen	18
1997–98	(Germany) Angelo Vier	FC Gütersloh	18
1998–99	(Germany) Bruno Labbadia	Arminia Bielefeld	28
1999–2000	(Croatia) Tomislav Marić	Stuttgarter Kickers	21
2000–01	(Poland) Artur Wichniarek (Cameroon) Olivier Djappa	Arminia Bielefeld SSV Reutlingen	18
2001–02	(Poland) Artur Wichniarek	Arminia Bielefeld	20
2002–03	(Ukraine) Andriy Voronin	1. FSV Mainz 05	20
2003–04	(Slovakia) Marek Mintál (Spain) Francisco Copado	1. FC Nürnberg; SpVgg Unterhaching	18
2004–05	(Germany) Lukas Podolski	1. FC Köln	24
2005–06	(Germany) Christian Eigler	SpVgg Greuther Fürth	18
2006–07	(Italy) Giovanni Federico	Karlsruher SC	19
2007–08	(Slovenia) Milivoje Novaković	1. FC Köln	20
2008–09	(Slovakia) Marek Mintál (Democratic Republic of the Congo) Cédric Makiadi (Germany) Benjamin Auer	1. FC Nürnberg; MSV Duisburg Alemannia Aachen	16
2009–10	(Germany) Michael Thurk	FC Augsburg	23
2010–11	(Germany) Nils Petersen	Energie Cottbus	25
2011–12	(Canada) Olivier Occéan (Germany) Nick Proschwitz (Germany) Alexander Meier	SpVgg Greuther Fürth SC Paderborn Eintracht Frankfurt	17
2012–13	(Democratic Republic of the Congo) Domi Kumbela	Eintracht Braunschweig	19
2013–14	(Turkey) Mahir Sağlık (Slovakia) Jakub Sylvestr	SC Paderborn Erzgebirge Aue	15
2014–15	(Germany) Rouwen Hennings	Karlsruher SC	17
2015–16	(Germany) Simon Terodde	VfL Bochum	25
2016–17	(Germany) Simon Terodde	VfB Stuttgart	25
2017–18	(Germany) Marvin Ducksch	Holstein Kiel	18
2018–19	(Germany) Simon Terodde	1. FC Köln	29
2019–20	(Germany) Fabian Klos	Arminia Bielefeld	21
2020–21	(Germany) Serdar Dursun	Darmstadt 98	27
2021–22	(Germany) Simon Terodde	Schalke 04	30
2022–23	(Germany) Tim Kleindienst	1. FC Heidenheim	25
2023–24	(Germany) Robert Glatzel (Bosnia and Herzegovina) Haris Tabaković (Greece) Christos Tzolis	Hamburger SV Hertha BSC Fortuna Düsseldorf	22
2024–25	(Germany) Davie Selke	Hamburger SV	22
2025–26	(Germany) Noel Futkeu	Greuther Fürth	19
