= Volker Graul =

German footballer (1952–2022)

- Graul in 1974

Personal information
- Date of birth: 18 June 1952
- Place of birth: Gütersloh, North Rhine-Westphalia, West Germany
- Date of death: 22 May 2022 (aged 69)
- Place of death: Bad Rothenfelde, Lower Saxony, Germany
- Position: Forward

Youth career
- ?–1969: SVA Gütersloh

Senior career*
Years	Team	Apps	(Gls)
1970–1972	VfL Osnabrück	50	(21)
1972–1973	Den Bosch	30	(10)
1973–1976	Arminia Bielefeld	77	(52)
1976–1977	Preußen Münster	32	(13)
1977–1978	Fortuna Köln	49	(22)
1979–1981	Arminia Bielefeld	64	(8)
1981–1983	Gütersloh		

International career
1969–1970	West Germany Youth	7	(2)
1975	West Germany B	1	(0)

Managerial career
- 1995–1996: FC Gütersloh
- * Club domestic league appearances and goals

Volker Graul (18 June 1952 – 22 May 2022) was a German footballer who played as a forward. He began his career as a professional footballer in 1970 with VfL Osnabrück, with whom he became champion and runner-up in the Regionalliga Nord. In 1973, he played two half-seasons with Den Bosch in the first two Dutch leagues. As a player for Arminia Bielefeld, he was the top scorer in the 2. Bundesliga Nord in 1974–75 with 30 goals. He also made 45 Bundesliga appearances for Arminia Bielefeld between 1978 and 1981, scoring six goals. Towards the end of the 1970s, he also played for Preußen Münster and Fortuna Köln in the 2. Bundesliga. Throughout the mid-1990s, he had success as manager and coach of FC Gütersloh. He would also briefly represent his home country of West Germany in 1969, 1970 and 1975.

== Club career ==
=== Regionalliga and Eredivisie ===
Growing up in Gütersloh and developing his footballing skills in the youth department of SVA Gütersloh, the talented attacker already attracted the interest of the German Football Association in the A team of the West German youth team. For his senior year debut in the 1970–71 season, Graul signed a contract with VfL Osnabrück for the 1970–71 Regionalliga Nord. The team from Bremer Brücke, located in the heart of the Schinkel, had won the championships in the north in 1969 and 1970. Graul belonged to the championship team again for the 1970–71 season under Fritz Langner and in 1971–72 he won the championship as runner-ups with coach Erwin Türk. In the two promotion rounds to the Bundesliga in 1971 and 1972, however, VfL was unable to prevail. In the 1972–73 preliminary round, the young striker played ten games with four goals for Osnabrück and then moved to Den Bosch for the 1972–73 Eredivisie. In total, he has played 49 games in the Regionalliga Nord and scored 22 goals.

Den Bosch, who were in the penultimate place in the Eredivisie when Graul arrived, were unable to improve until the end of the season and were relegated. In 17 Eredivisie appearances, Graul scored four goals. In the beginning of the 1973–74 Eerste Divisie, Graul scored six goals in 13 games until his departure at the beginning of December 1973, four of them penalties. Most pressing news was that he no longer had a regular place in the team, which was also fighting against relegation in the Eerste Divisie. When Arminia Bielefeld had to worry about staying in the league in the last regional league round of the 1973–74 Regionalliga West, with 8:28 points after the preliminary round, Volker Graul returned to his home state of North Rhine-Westphalia and played for the team from the second half of the season. He scored eleven goals in 16 games and thus played a significant role in Arminia's 14th place in the table and the associated nomination for the inaugural 1974–75 2. Bundesliga. In addition to signing Graul, Arminia Bielefeld had three coaches in action: Norbert Lessle, Willy Nolting and the coach typically regarded as the club's savior from relegation, Rudi Faßnacht, who had also signed Jonny Hey with him.

=== 2. Bundesliga and Bundesliga ===
Bielefeld improved significantly in the debut year of the 1974–75 2. Bundesliga, compared to the last round of the Regionalliga and, under coach Erhard Ahmann, finished fourth in the Nord Division with 50:26 points behind champions Hannover 96, runners-up Bayer 05 Uerdingen and FC St. Pauli. Volker Graul became the second league top scorer with 30 goals ahead of Gerd-Volker Schock, who would later play quite successfully for Arminia.Arminia benefited from new signing Ewald Lienen, who overran the opposing defensive lines from the wing and also shone with good assists to the centre-forward after his dribbles. Since Bielefeld prevented Graul from the possibility of transferring to either Bayern Munich or to Hamburger SV, now with little motivation, scored only eleven goals in 24 appearances in the 1975–76 2. Bundesliga and signed for the new 1976–77 2. Bundesliga season with Preußen Münster. From 1974 to 1976, Bielefeld played 61 games in the 2nd division, scoring 40 goals.

Münster came in sixth place in the 1976–77 season with the coaches Rudi Faßnacht and Werner Biskup from April 1977, equal on points with several other teams. Graul had scored 13 goals in 32 games and accepted an offer from Jean Löring, the president of Fortuna Köln, for the 1977–78 2. Bundesliga. In the cathedral city, he increased his scoring rate to 18 goals, but Fortuna only reached fourth place under coaches Ernst-Günter Habig and from January 1978, Rudi Faßnacht which prevented the long-awaited return to the Bundesliga. He only stayed in Köln's Südstadt at the beginning of the 1978–79 preliminary round as by the end of his tenure with the club, he played a total of 47 second division games for Köln with 22 goals and returned to Bundesliga newcomers Bielefeld in October 1978. He contributed the point-scoring goal to his Bundesliga debut on 14 October in the 1–1 home draw against VfB Stuttgart.

Two points behind Schalke 04, Bielefeld finished 16th with coaches Milovan Beljin and Otto Rehhagel from 10 October 1978 and was relegated to the 2. Bundesliga once more. Graul had played 26 games and scored six goals. When Bielefeld won the championship in the 1978–79 2. Bundesliga with coaches Otto Rehhagel and Hans-Dieter Tippenhauer from October 1979, ahead of Rot-Weiss Essen and thus achieved an immediate return to the Bundesliga, Graul was no longer one of Arminia's top scorers as Christian Sackewitz, Norbert Eilenfeldt and Gerd-Volker Schock had since taken over his record. During the 1979–80 Bundesliga, he would contribute to the club's decisive victory over Bayern Munich via one goal in a 4–0 victory on 10 March 1979.

In 16 appearances, he contributed to the championship and promotion with two goals. He ended his professional career with Arminia Bielefeld after the 1980–81 Bundesliga, when Arminia narrowly managed to stay in the Bundesliga with 15th place and Graul had played another 19 games in the Bundesliga without scoring a goal. In the end, he played 45 games with 6 goals in the Bundesliga and 156 games with 78 goals in the 2. Bundesliga.

== International career ==
On 18 October 1969, the striker made his debut in the German youth team alongside team-mates Uli Hoeneß and Rainer Bonhof in the international match of the youth national team in Geleen against the Netherlands. He played in the Atlantic Cup in Las Palmas in February 1970, in the qualifiers for the 1970 UEFA European Under-18 Championship in March and April and in play in the final tournament later in May. In total, he would play in seven matches and scored two goals.

In 1975, Graul came back into the sights of the DFB. He played on 8 October 1975 in the international match representing West Germany B in Duisburg against Romania. In the 2–0 victory, the attack was manned by Reiner Geye, Karl-Heinz Handschuh, Graul, Bernd Gersdorff and Josef Pirrung.

== Amateur and Managerial careers ==
From the 1981–82 season, he played for FC Gütersloh in the amateur Oberliga Westfalen. In the 1983–84 Oberliga Westfalen, he was involved in the FC Gütersloh affair together with Roland Peitsch and successfully sued for his promised "salary" in a total amount of 180,000 DM in a civil court, whereupon the Westphalian Football and Athletics Association sentenced him to a fine of 15,000 marks and a three-year ban for violating amateur regulations. Graul retired as a footballer at the age of 30 out of annoyance as in the following three years he more or less only played in the Borgholzhausen old men's team of TuS Solbad Ravensberg and ran a trade in used cars. Later he worked as a player's agent and worked part-time as a real estate agent.

At FC Gütersloh, which Graul described as "probably the most dazzling personality in the club's history", he led the club as manager through the most successful years in its history in the 1990s, serving in between April and May 1995 and from April to June 1996. In those two seasons, the club was promoted from the fourth-tier Oberliga Westfalen via the Regionalliga West/Südwest to the 2nd Bundesliga. In 1998, the club reached the peak of its history with fifth place. However, the subsequent decline of the Gütersloh team was primarily blamed on him. During the 1998–99 2. Bundesliga, the club was relegated from the 2. Bundesliga, with Graul sitting on the bench once on matchday 6 against Stuttgarter Kickers. In 2000, the highly indebted club had to be dissolved.

=== Corruption scandals ===
In 2006, Graul, together with player agent Fali Ramadani, played a central role in the embezzlement investigations against the ex-manager of Bayer Leverkusen, Reiner Calmund, in which the family of Burim Osmani are also said to have been involved. In 2007, Graul and Ramadani were again involved in a scandal over player transfers with TuS Koblenz.

== Personal life and death ==
Volker Graul was the son of Franz Graul, who played for Werder Bremen in the Oberliga Nord between 1947 and 1950. During his career as a player, he was often compared to his teammate Ewald Lienen due to both being from the same state of North Rhine-Westphalia as it would experience a boom in football throughout the 1970s and 1980s. This was due to their contrasting perspectives in their careers, whereas Lienen refused to sign autographs and was a critic of capitalism, Graul would often have no qualms with it.

In his later years, Graul had suffered from heart problems for years, died on 22 May 2022, a few weeks before his 70th birthday in a clinic in Bad Rothenfelde.
