= Promotion to the Bundesliga =

- Organiser(s): Deutsche Fußball Liga
- Founded: 1963; 63 years ago
- Region: Germany
- Teams: 2 or 3
- Qualifier for: Bundesliga
- Current champions: Schalke 04 SV Elversberg SC Paderborn (2025–26)
- 2026–27 2. Bundesliga

The Promotion to the Bundesliga (German: Aufstiegsrunde zur Bundesliga) is an end-of-season competition, held annually to determine the clubs that are promoted from the Regionalligas, later the 2. Bundesliga to the Bundesliga. Originally, it was necessary because there were more second division champions than promotion spots available. From 1974 onwards, it involves only two clubs who determine the third possible promotion spot to the Bundesliga.

== Leagues ==
=== 1963–74 ===
When the Bundesliga was formed in 1963, the German Football Association established five regional second divisions below it, the Regionalligas, these being:

- Regionalliga Süd
- Regionalliga Südwest
- Regionalliga West
- Regionalliga Berlin
- Regionalliga Nord

Because the boundaries of these five leagues went along historical lines, determined by the boundaries of the five German sub-federations, the playing strength of the leagues was not equal. To determine the two teams to be promoted to the Bundesliga each season, a promotion round was held. The number of teams from each Regionalliga qualified for this event was not equal, for the above-mentioned reason.

From 1963, the first two teams in each Regionalliga was qualified for the promotion round, except from Berlin, who would only send the champions. To reduce the number of clubs from nine to eight, a home-and-away decider was played between two of the runners-ups. The origin of the two teams in this altered annually. The eight teams would then play a home-and-away round in two groups of four with the winners qualified for the Bundesliga. Teams from the same Regionalliga would not play in the same group. This system was in place till 1966.

From 1967, the groups were expanded to five clubs and all five Regionalligas send their runners-up to the competition. Otherwise, the modus remained unchanged. This system remained in place until 1974, when the Regionalligas were disbanded.

=== 1974–81 ===
In 1974, the five Regionalligas were replaced by two 2. Bundesligas, those being:

- 2. Bundesliga Süd
- 2. Bundesliga Nord

The two league champions would now be directly promoted to the Bundesliga while the two runners-up played a home-and-away round to determine the third promoted team. This system remained in place until the single 2. Bundesliga replaced the two leagues.

=== 1981–91 ===
With the introduction of the single-division 2. Bundesliga in 1981, a promotion round would have become unnecessary as the top-three teams could have been directly promoted. Instead, only the top two teams achieved direct promotion. The third-placed club had to play the 16th placed club from the Bundesliga in a home-and-away round for the last spot in the first division. This series was played until 1991.

With the German reunion in 1991 and the influx of clubs from the former DDR-Oberliga, the promotion round between the two clubs was stopped. In the 1990–91 season, five clubs were promoted to the Bundesliga, three from the west and two from the east.

=== 1991–92 ===
As a transition season due to the integration of the East German clubs, only two clubs were promoted from the second to the first division. Also, the 2. Bundesliga was split into two regional groups for this season.

=== 1992–2008 ===
In this era, the top three teams of the 2. Bundesliga were directly promoted to the Bundesliga.

=== 2008–present ===
From 2009, the promotion series between the 16th-placed Bundesliga club and the third-placed 2. Bundesliga team was reestablished. The Bundesliga follows its own past example as well as the one set by the English Premier League, French Ligue 1, and Italian Serie A, where these games are in place too and quite popular.

== Promoted teams ==
=== 1963–74 ===
| Season | First | Second | Third |
|---|---|---|---|
| 1963–64 | Hannover 96 | Borussia Neunkirchen | — |
| 1964–65 | Bayern Munich | Borussia Mönchengladbach | Tasmania Berlin |
| 1965–66 | Fortuna Düsseldorf | Rot-Weiss Essen | — |
| 1966–67 | Alemannia Aachen | Borussia Neunkirchen (2) | — |
| 1967–68 | Kickers Offenbach | Hertha BSC | — |
| 1968–69 | Rot-Weiss Essen (2) | Rot-Weiß Oberhausen | — |
| 1969–70 | Arminia Bielefeld | Kickers Offenbach (2) | — |
| 1970–71 | VfL Bochum | Fortuna Düsseldorf (2) | — |
| 1971–72 | Wuppertaler SV | Kickers Offenbach (3) | — |
| 1972–73 | Rot-Weiss Essen (3) | Fortuna Köln | — |
| 1973–74 | Eintracht Braunschweig | Tennis Borussia Berlin | — |

- In 1965, Tasmania Berlin was promoted to replace Hertha BSC in the league, without having qualified for it.

=== 1974–81 ===
| Season | South | North | Third |
|---|---|---|---|
| 1974–75 | Karlsruher SC | Hannover 96 (2) | Bayer Uerdingen |
| 1975–76 | 1. FC Saarbrücken | Tennis Borussia Berlin (2) | Borussia Dortmund |
| 1976–77 | VfB Stuttgart | FC St. Pauli | 1860 Munich |
| 1977–78 | Darmstadt 98 | Arminia Bielefeld (2) | 1. FC Nürnberg |
| 1978–79 | 1860 Munich (2) | Bayer Leverkusen | Bayer Uerdingen (2) |
| 1979–80 | 1. FC Nürnberg (2) | Arminia Bielefeld (3) | Karlsruher SC (2) |
| 1980–81 | Darmstadt 98 (2) | Werder Bremen | Eintracht Braunschweig (2) |

=== 1981–90 ===
| Season | First | Second | Third |
|---|---|---|---|
| 1981–82 | Schalke 04 | Hertha BSC (2) | — |
| 1982–83 | Waldhof Mannheim | Kickers Offenbach (4) | Bayer Uerdingen (3) |
| 1983–84 | Karlsruher SC (3) | Schalke 04 (2) | — |
| 1984–85 | 1. FC Nürnberg (3) | Hannover 96 (3) | 1. FC Saarbrücken (2) |
| 1985–86 | FC Homburg | Blau-Weiß Berlin | — |
| 1986–87 | Hannover 96 (4) | Karlsruher SC (4) | — |
| 1987–88 | Stuttgarter Kickers | FC St. Pauli (2) | — |
| 1988–89 | Fortuna Düsseldorf (3) | FC Homburg (2) | — |
| 1989–90 | Hertha BSC (2) | SG Wattenscheid | — |

=== 1990–91 ===
| Season | First | Second | Third | East First | East Second |
|---|---|---|---|---|---|
| 1990–91 | Schalke 04 (3) | MSV Duisburg | Stuttgarter Kickers (2) | Hansa Rostock | Dynamo Dresden |

=== 1991–92 ===
| Season | South | North |
|---|---|---|
| 1991–92 | 1. FC Saarbrücken (3) | Bayer Uerdingen (4) |

=== 1992–present ===
| Season | First | Second | Third |
|---|---|---|---|
| 1992–93 | SC Freiburg | MSV Duisburg (2) | VfB Leipzig |
| 1993–94 | VfL Bochum (2) | Bayer Uerdingen (5) | 1860 Munich (3) |
| 1994–95 | Hansa Rostock (2) | FC St. Pauli (3) | Fortuna Düsseldorf (4) |
| 1995–96 | VfL Bochum (3) | Arminia Bielefeld (4) | MSV Duisburg (3) |
| 1996–97 | 1. FC Kaiserslautern | VfL Wolfsburg | Hertha BSC (3) |
| 1997–98 | Eintracht Frankfurt | SC Freiburg (2) | 1. FC Nürnberg (4) |
| 1998–99 | Arminia Bielefeld (5) | SpVgg Unterhaching | SSV Ulm |
| 1999–2000 | 1. FC Köln | VfL Bochum (4) | Energie Cottbus |
| 2000–01 | 1. FC Nürnberg (5) | Borussia Mönchengladbach (2) | FC St. Pauli (4) |
| 2001–02 | Hannover 96 (5) | Arminia Bielefeld (6) | VfL Bochum (5) |
| 2002–03 | SC Freiburg (3) | 1. FC Köln (2) | Eintracht Frankfurt (2) |
| 2003–04 | 1. FC Nürnberg (6) | Arminia Bielefeld (7) | Mainz 05 |
| 2004–05 | 1. FC Köln (3) | MSV Duisburg (4) | Eintracht Frankfurt (3) |
| 2005–06 | VfL Bochum (6) | Alemannia Aachen (2) | Energie Cottbus (2) |
| 2006–07 | Karlsruher SC (5) | Hansa Rostock (3) | MSV Duisburg (5) |
| 2007–08 | Borussia Mönchengladbach (3) | TSG Hoffenheim | 1. FC Köln (4) |
| 2008–09 | SC Freiburg (4) | Mainz 05 (2) | 1. FC Nürnberg (7) |
| 2009–10 | 1. FC Kaiserslautern (2) | FC St. Pauli (5) | — |
| 2010–11 | Hertha BSC (4) | FC Augsburg | — |
| 2011–12 | Greuther Fürth | Eintracht Frankfurt (4) | Fortuna Düsseldorf (5) |
| 2012–13 | Hertha BSC (5) | Eintracht Braunschweig (3) | — |
| 2013–14 | 1. FC Köln (4) | SC Paderborn | — |
| 2014–15 | FC Ingolstadt | Darmstadt 98 (3) | — |
| 2015–16 | SC Freiburg (5) | RB Leipzig | — |
| 2016–17 | VfB Stuttgart (2) | Hannover 96 (6) | — |
| 2017–18 | Fortuna Düsseldorf (6) | 1. FC Nürnberg (8) | — |
| 2018–19 | 1. FC Köln (5) | SC Paderborn (2) | Union Berlin |
| 2019–20 | Arminia Bielefeld (8) | VfB Stuttgart (3) | — |
| 2020–21 | VfL Bochum (7) | Greuther Fürth (2) | — |
| 2021–22 | Schalke 04 (4) | Werder Bremen (2) | — |
| 2022–23 | 1. FC Heidenheim | Darmstadt 98 (4) | — |
| 2023–24 | FC St. Pauli (6) | Holstein Kiel | — |
| 2024–25 | 1. FC Köln (6) | Hamburger SV | — |
| 2025–26 | Schalke 04 (5) | SV Elversberg | SC Paderborn (3) |

- Number in brackets behind club denotes the number of promotion when there was more than one.

== Clubs taking part in the promotion round ==
=== Participating clubs (1963–74) ===
The southern clubs:

| Season | RL Süd (1st) | RL Süd (2nd) | RL Südwest (1st) | RL Südwest (2nd) |
|---|---|---|---|---|
| 1963–64 | Hessen Kassel | Bayern Munich | **Borussia Neunkirchen** | FK Pirmasens |
| 1964–65 | **Bayern Munich** | SSV Reutlingen | 1. FC Saarbrücken | Wormatia Worms |
| 1965–66 | Schweinfurt 05 | Kickers Offenbach | FK Pirmasens | 1. FC Saarbrücken |
| 1966–67 | Kickers Offenbach | Bayern Hof | **Borussia Neunkirchen** | 1. FC Saarbrücken |
| 1967–68 | Bayern Hof | **Kickers Offenbach** | SV Alsenborn | TuS Neuendorf |
| 1968–69 | Karlsruher SC | Freiburger FC | SV Alsenborn | TuS Neuendorf |
| 1969–70 | **Kickers Offenbach** | Karlsruher SC | SV Alsenborn | FK Pirmasens |
| 1970–71 | 1. FC Nürnberg | Karlsruher SC | Borussia Neunkirchen | FK Pirmasens |
| 1971–72 | **Kickers Offenbach** | Bayern Hof | Borussia Neunkirchen | Röchling Völklingen |
| 1972–73 | Darmstadt 98 | Karlsruher SC | Mainz 05 | Röchling Völklingen |
| 1973–74 | FC Augsburg | 1. FC Nürnberg | Borussia Neunkirchen | 1. FC Saarbrücken |

The northern clubs:

| Season | RL West (1st) | RL West (2nd) | RL Nord (1st) | RL Nord (2nd) | RL Berlin (1st) | RL Berlin (2nd) |
|---|---|---|---|---|---|---|
| 1963–64 | Alemannia Aachen | Wuppertaler SV | FC St. Pauli | **Hannover 96** | Tasmania Berlin | — |
| 1964–65 | **Borussia Mönchengladbach** | Alemannia Aachen | Holstein Kiel | FC St. Pauli | Tennis Borussia Berlin | — |
| 1965–66 | **Fortuna Düsseldorf** | **Rot-Weiss Essen** | FC St. Pauli | SC Göttingen | Hertha BSC | — |
| 1966–67 | **Alemannia Aachen** | Schwarz-Weiß Essen | Arminia Hannover | SC Göttingen | Hertha BSC | Tennis Borussia Berlin |
| 1967–68 | Bayer Leverkusen | Rot-Weiss Essen | Arminia Hannover | SC Göttingen | **Hertha BSC** | Tennis Borussia Berlin |
| 1968–69 | **Rot-Weiß Oberhausen** | **Rot-Weiss Essen** | VfL Osnabrück | VfB Lübeck | Hertha Zehlendorf | Tasmania Berlin |
| 1969–70 | VfL Bochum | **Arminia Bielefeld** | VfL Osnabrück | VfL Wolfsburg | Hertha Zehlendorf | Tennis Borussia Berlin |
| 1970–71 | **VfL Bochum** | **Fortuna Düsseldorf** | VfL Osnabrück | FC St. Pauli | Tasmania Berlin | Wacker Berlin |
| 1971–72 | **Wuppertaler SV** | Rot-Weiss Essen | FC St. Pauli | VfL Osnabrück | Wacker Berlin | Tasmania Berlin |
| 1972–73 | **Rot-Weiss Essen** | **Fortuna Köln** | FC St. Pauli | VfL Osnabrück | Blau-Weiß Berlin | Wacker Berlin |
| 1973–74 | SG Wattenscheid | Rot-Weiß Oberhausen | **Eintracht Braunschweig** | FC St. Pauli | **Tennis Borussia Berlin** | Wacker Berlin |

- **Bold** denotes promoted team.
- In 1964, Wuppertaler SV lost to FK Pirmasens 1–2 and 0–2 in the qualifying, missing out on the promotion round.
- In 1965, FC St.Pauli lost to SSV Reutlingen 1–0 and 1–4 aet in the qualifying, missing out on the promotion round.
- In 1966, SC Göttingen 05 lost to 1. FC Saarbrücken 0–3 and 0–4 in the qualifying, missing out on the promotion round.

=== North-South promotion games (1974–1981) ===
1974–75

| Team 1 | Agg. | Team 2 | 1st leg | 2nd leg |
|---|---|---|---|---|
| FK Pirmasens (S) | 4–10 | **Bayer Uerdingen** (N) | 4–4 | 0–6 |

1975–76

| Team 1 | Agg. | Team 2 | 1st leg | 2nd leg |
|---|---|---|---|---|
| 1. FC Nürnberg (S) | 2–4 | **Borussia Dortmund** (N) | 0–1 | 2–3 |

1976–77

| Team 1 | Agg. | Team 2 | 1st leg | 2nd leg | 3rd leg |
|---|---|---|---|---|---|
| **1860 Munich** (S) | 4–6 | Arminia Bielefeld (N) | 4–0 | 0–4 | 2–0 |

1977–78

| Team 1 | Agg. | Team 2 | 1st leg | 2nd leg |
|---|---|---|---|---|
| **1. FC Nürnberg** (S) | 3–2 | Rot-Weiss Essen (N) | 1–0 | 2–2 |

1978–79

| Team 1 | Agg. | Team 2 | 1st leg | 2nd leg |
|---|---|---|---|---|
| SpVgg Bayreuth (S) | 2–3 | **Bayer Uerdingen** (N) | 1–1 | 1–2 |

1979–80

| Team 1 | Agg. | Team 2 | 1st leg | 2nd leg |
|---|---|---|---|---|
| **Karlsruher SC** (S) | 6–4 | Rot-Weiss Essen (N) | 5–1 | 1–3 |

1980–81

| Team 1 | Agg. | Team 2 | 1st leg | 2nd leg |
|---|---|---|---|---|
| Kickers Offenbach (S) | 1–2 | **Eintracht Braunschweig** (N) | 1–0 | 0–2 |

=== Bundesliga versus 2. Bundesliga (1981–91) ===
1981–82

| Team 1 | Agg. | Team 2 | 1st leg | 2nd leg |
|---|---|---|---|---|
| **Bayer Leverkusen** (B) | 3–0 | Kickers Offenbach (2B) | 1–0 | 2–0 |

1982–83

| Team 1 | Agg. | Team 2 | 1st leg | 2nd leg |
|---|---|---|---|---|
| Schalke 04 (B) | 2–4 | **Bayer Uerdingen** (2B) | 1–3 | 1–1 |

1983–84

| Team 1 | Agg. | Team 2 | 1st leg | 2nd leg |
|---|---|---|---|---|
| **Eintracht Frankfurt** (B) | 6–1 | MSV Duisburg (2B) | 5–0 | 1–1 |

1984–85

| Team 1 | Agg. | Team 2 | 1st leg | 2nd leg |
|---|---|---|---|---|
| Arminia Bielefeld (B) | 1–3 | **1. FC Saarbrücken** (2B) | 0–2 | 1–1 |

1985–86

| Team 1 | Agg. | Team 2 | 1st leg | 2nd leg | 3rd leg |
|---|---|---|---|---|---|
| **Borussia Dortmund** (B) | 11–3 | Fortuna Köln (2B) | 0–2 | 3–1 | 8–0 |

1986–87

| Team 1 | Agg. | Team 2 | 1st leg | 2nd leg |
|---|---|---|---|---|
| **FC Homburg** (B) | 4–3 | FC St. Pauli (2B) | 3–1 | 1–2 |

1987–88

| Team 1 | Agg. | Team 2 | 1st leg | 2nd leg | 3rd leg |
|---|---|---|---|---|---|
| **Waldhof Mannheim** (B) | 4–4 (5–4 p) | Darmstadt 98 (2B) | 2–3 | 2–1 | 0–0 (5–4 p) |

1988–89

| Team 1 | Agg. | Team 2 | 1st leg | 2nd leg |
|---|---|---|---|---|
| **Eintracht Frankfurt** (B) | 3–2 | 1. FC Saarbrücken (2B) | 2–0 | 1–2 |

1989–90

| Team 1 | Agg. | Team 2 | 1st leg | 2nd leg |
|---|---|---|---|---|
| **VfL Bochum** (B) | 1–0 | 1. FC Saarbrücken (2B) | 1–0 | 0–0 |

1990–91

| Team 1 | Agg. | Team 2 | 1st leg | 2nd leg | 3rd leg |
|---|---|---|---|---|---|
| FC St. Pauli (B) | 3–5 | **Stuttgarter Kickers** (2B) | 1–1 | 1–1 | 1–3 |

=== Bundesliga versus 2. Bundesliga (2008–present) ===
2008–09

| Team 1 | Agg. | Team 2 | 1st leg | 2nd leg |
|---|---|---|---|---|
| Energie Cottbus (B) | 0–5 | **1. FC Nürnberg** (2B) | 0–3 | 0–2 |

2009–10

| Team 1 | Agg. | Team 2 | 1st leg | 2nd leg |
|---|---|---|---|---|
| **1. FC Nürnberg** (B) | 3–0 | FC Augsburg (2B) | 1–0 | 2–0 |

2010–11

| Team 1 | Agg. | Team 2 | 1st leg | 2nd leg |
|---|---|---|---|---|
| **Borussia Mönchengladbach** (B) | 2–1 | VfL Bochum (2B) | 1–0 | 1–1 |

2011–12

| Team 1 | Agg. | Team 2 | 1st leg | 2nd leg |
|---|---|---|---|---|
| Hertha BSC (B) | 3–4 | **Fortuna Düsseldorf** (2B) | 1–2 | 2–2 |

2012–13

| Team 1 | Agg. | Team 2 | 1st leg | 2nd leg |
|---|---|---|---|---|
| **TSG Hoffenheim** (B) | 5–2 | 1. FC Kaiserslautern (2B) | 3–1 | 2–1 |

2013–14

| Team 1 | Agg. | Team 2 | 1st leg | 2nd leg |
|---|---|---|---|---|
| **Hamburger SV** (B) | 1–1 (a) | Greuther Fürth (2B) | 0–0 | 1–1 |

2014–15

| Team 1 | Agg. | Team 2 | 1st leg | 2nd leg |
|---|---|---|---|---|
| **Hamburger SV** (B) | 3–2 | Karlsruher SC (2B) | 1–1 | 2–1 (a.e.t.) |

2015–16

| Team 1 | Agg. | Team 2 | 1st leg | 2nd leg |
|---|---|---|---|---|
| **Eintracht Frankfurt** (B) | 2–1 | 1. FC Nürnberg (2B) | 1–1 | 1–0 |

2016–17

| Team 1 | Agg. | Team 2 | 1st leg | 2nd leg |
|---|---|---|---|---|
| **VfL Wolfsburg** (B) | 2–0 | Eintracht Braunschweig (2B) | 1–0 | 1–0 |

2017–18

| Team 1 | Agg. | Team 2 | 1st leg | 2nd leg |
|---|---|---|---|---|
| **VfL Wolfsburg** (B) | 4–1 | Holstein Kiel (2B) | 3–1 | 1–0 |

2018–19

| Team 1 | Agg. | Team 2 | 1st leg | 2nd leg |
|---|---|---|---|---|
| VfB Stuttgart (B) | 2–2 (a) | **Union Berlin** (2B) | 2–2 | 0–0 |

2019–20

| Team 1 | Agg. | Team 2 | 1st leg | 2nd leg |
|---|---|---|---|---|
| **Werder Bremen** (B) | 2–2 (a) | 1. FC Heidenheim (2B) | 0–0 | 2–2 |

2020–21

| Team 1 | Agg. | Team 2 | 1st leg | 2nd leg |
|---|---|---|---|---|
| **1. FC Köln** (B) | 5–2 | Holstein Kiel (2B) | 0–1 | 5–1 |

2021–22

| Team 1 | Agg. | Team 2 | 1st leg | 2nd leg |
|---|---|---|---|---|
| **Hertha BSC** (B) | 2–1 | Hamburger SV (2B) | 0–1 | 2–0 |

2022–23

| Team 1 | Agg. | Team 2 | 1st leg | 2nd leg |
|---|---|---|---|---|
| **VfB Stuttgart** (B) | 6–1 | Hamburger SV (2B) | 3–0 | 3–1 |

2023–24

| Team 1 | Agg. | Team 2 | 1st leg | 2nd leg |
|---|---|---|---|---|
| **VfL Bochum** (B) | 3–3 (6–5 p) | Fortuna Düsseldorf (2B) | 0–3 | 3–0 (a.e.t.) |

2024–25

| Team 1 | Agg. | Team 2 | 1st leg | 2nd leg |
|---|---|---|---|---|
| **1. FC Heidenheim** (B) | 4–3 | SV Elversberg (2B) | 2–2 | 2–1 |

2025–26

| Team 1 | Agg. | Team 2 | 1st leg | 2nd leg |
|---|---|---|---|---|
| VfL Wolfsburg (B) | 1–2 | SC Paderborn (2B) | 0–0 | 1–2 (a.e.t.) |

=== Key ===
- Winner in **bold**.

| Symbol | Key |
|---|---|
| (B) | Bundesliga – 16th-placed team |
| (2B) | 2. Bundesliga – 3rd-placed team |
| (N) | 2. Bundesliga North – 2nd-placed team |
| (S) | 2. Bundesliga South – 2nd-placed team |

== See also ==
- Promotion to the 2. Bundesliga
- Promotion to the 3. Liga
