= Jürgen Gelsdorf =

German football player and manager

Personal information
- Date of birth: 19 January 1953 (age 73)
- Place of birth: Duisburg, West Germany
- Height: 1.86 m (6 ft 1 in)
- Position: Defender

Team information
- Current team: Bayer Leverkusen (youth teams coordinator)

Youth career
- –1972: MSV Duisburg

Senior career*
Years	Team	Apps	(Gls)
1972–1976	Arminia Bielefeld	64	(3)
1976–1986	Bayer Leverkusen	296	(26)

Managerial career
- 1986–1989: Bayer Leverkusen (assistant)
- 1989–1991: Bayer Leverkusen
- 1991–1992: Borussia Mönchengladbach
- 1992–1994: VfL Bochum
- 1995–1997: Fortuna Köln
- 1997–1998: KFC Uerdingen 05
- 1998–1999: FC Gütersloh
- 1999–2000: Fortuna Düsseldorf
- 2000–2003: VfL Osnabrück
- 2003–2005: Rot-Weiss Essen
- 2005: Bayer Leverkusen (scout)
- 2005–2007: Bayer Leverkusen (U-19)
- 2007–: Bayer Leverkusen (youth team coordinator)
- * Club domestic league appearances and goals

Jürgen Gelsdorf (born 19 January 1953) is a German football coach and former player who is currently youth teams coordinator at Bayer 04 Leverkusen.

== Sporting career ==
=== As a player ===
For the 1972/73 season, 19-year-old junior soccer player Jürgen Gelsdorf joined Arminia Bielefeld from MSV Duisburg in the Regionalliga West. The "Alm" had to be rebuilt after its forced relegation from the Bundesliga in 1971/72. The team relied on talents like Hans-Jürgen Wloka (Borussia Mönchengladbach) and Bernd Wehmeyer (Bielefeld's own amateurs) and therefore also signed the talented defensive player Gelsdorf. Bielefeld did very badly in the last two rounds of the Regionalliga West (11th place 72/73; 14th place 73/74), but for Gelsdorf it brought competitive practice in 56 appearances with one goal. Improved by this, he also coped with the increased demands in the newly created 2nd Division North in the 1974-76 rounds. Arminia even played for promotion in 1974/75, and in 1975/76 they were in a secure midfield position. Gelsdorf was in 64 appearances with three goals in the Arminia defense. With Erhard Ahmann (44-time amateur international), he had a good teacher as a coach and therefore also caught the eye of the scouts from Bayer 04 Leverkusen. He moved to Leverkusen for the 1976/77 round. After Arminia Bielefeld won the second division championship in 1977/78, he seemed to have chosen the wrong club, but twelve months later, after Bayer 04 won the 2. Bundesliga championship in the 1978/79 season, he had done everything right after all. In the championship round, he had played in all 38 games and also scored eight goals. In the 1976-79 rounds, he was one of the most reliable players for Leverkusen in a total of 107 games, scoring 17 goals in the 2nd Division North. Under the direction of promotion coach Willibert Kremer, the team moved up to the Bundesliga. Former FIFA coach and Bayern coach Dettmar Cramer then continued to hone the defensive qualities of the player, who had matured into a veteran in the meantime, from 1982 to 1985 before Gelsdorf then ended his active playing career with six appearances in the 1985/86 round under former DFB coach Erich Ribbeck.

=== As a coach ===
The transition from player to coach was seamless. From 1 July 1986, Gelsdorf was Bayer 04's full-time youth coach, and on 1 July 1988, he moved to the side of new head coach Rinus Michels as co-trainer. On 13 April 1989, he succeeded Michels and was in charge as head coach until 31 May 1991. Despite the additions of Jorginho (Flamengo Rio), Martin Kree (VfL Bochum), Sven Demandt (Fortuna Düsseldorf), Andreas Thom (Berliner FC Dynamo), Franco Foda (1. FC Kaiserslautern) and Ulf Kirsten (Dynamo Dresden), however, Bayer failed to make the leap to the top of the Bundesliga table. This was the main reason for his replacement on 31 May 1991.

He then worked for various clubs in the 1. and 2. Bundesliga as well as in the Fußball-Regionalliga. From 3 October 1991 to 6 November 1992, he was under contract with Borussia Mönchengladbach. With the Gladbach team, he reached the 1992 DFB Cup final against second-division team Hannover 96, but lost 4-3 on penalties. He then moved to VfL Bochum for two years and from 1995 to 1997 he coached SC Fortuna Köln. At the start of the 1997/98 season, Gelsdorf signed on with KFC Uerdingen 05, where he was dismissed after a year and a half in September 1998. In November of the same year, he became coach of VfL Osnabrück - at the end of the 2002/03 season, he then left the club at his own request. His last stop as a professional coach was Rot-Weiss Essen from 2003 to 2005.

== Private life ==
Jürgen Gelsdorf has two children. He lives in Odenthal.

== Honours ==
=== As a coach ===
- DFB-Pokal finalist: 1991–92
