= Heinlein (disambiguation) =

Heinlein is a surname.

Heinlein may also refer to:

- 6371 Heinlein, an asteroid named for Dieter Heinlein, a German amateur astronomer
- Heinlein (crater), a crater on Mars named for Robert A. Heinlein
- Heinlein Society, a foundation formed to honor Robert A. Heinlein
- Heinlein Prize for Advances in Space Commercialization, founded by Robert Heinlein
- Robert A. Heinlein Award, "for outstanding published works in science fiction and technical writings to inspire the human exploration of space"
