= Miss Germany 2012 =

Beauty pageant

- Date: February 11, 2012
- Venue: Europa-Park, Rust
- Winner: Isabel Gülck; Miss Ashampoo

Miss Germany 2012 was the 85th Miss Germany pageant, held on 11 February 2012. Twenty-year-old Isabel Gülck of Ashampoo won the competition.

== Results ==
=== Placings ===
Final results	Contestant
Miss Germany 2012	Miss Ashampoo - Isabel Glück
1st runner-up	Miss South Germany - Mareen Wehner
2nd runner-up	Miss Baden-Württemberg - Sabrina Licata

== Delegates ==
The Miss Germany 2012 "delegates" were:

Title	Name	Hometown	Age	Placement	Special awards	Notes
Miss Ashampoo	Isabel Glück		20	Miss Germany 2012		
Miss Baden-Württemberg	Sabrina Licata		22	2nd runner-up		
Miss Bavaria	Christina Trost		22			
Miss Berlin	Maria Rosenthal		21			
Miss Bremen	Paulina Kaluza		18			
Miss Brandenburg	Madeleine Westphal		24			
Miss Hamburg	Viviana Beltràn Velez		23			
Miss Hesse	Aylin Sezgin		19			
Miss Internet	Yassaman Hahn		23			
Miss Mecklenburg-Vorpommern	Elisabeth Bartesch		22			
Miss Central Germany	Sarah Stroh		21			
Miss Lower Saxony	Mayte Fritz		21			
Miss North Germany	Katja Kliewer		20			
Miss North Rhine-Westphalia	Janine Wöller		23			
Miss East Germany	Isabell Bade		19			
Miss Rhineland-Palatinate	Viktoria Tschenin		22			
Miss Saarland	Nathalie Masson		23			
Miss Saxony-Anhalt	Jenny Edner		21			
Miss Schleswig-Holstein	Vanessa Reder		22			
Miss South Germany	Mareen Wehner		25	1st runner-up		
Miss South West Germany	Giulia Möckel		19			
Miss Thuringia	Kristina Mikhailenkov		18			
Miss West Germany	Christin Heuler		21			

== Judges ==
- Reiner Calmund – German football executive
- Marcus Schenkenberg – Swedish actor and model
