= 1977–78 2. Bundesliga =

4th season of the second-tier football league in Germany

2. Bundesliga
- Season: 1977–78
- Champions: Nord: Arminia Bielefeld; Süd: Darmstadt 98
- Promoted: Nord: Arminia Bielefeld; Süd: Darmstadt 98; 1. FC Nürnberg
- Relegated: Nord: 1. FC Bocholt; OSC Bremerhaven; Schwarz-Weiß Essen; Süd: FC Bayern Hof; VfR 1910 Bürstadt; Kickers Würzburg; FK Pirmasens
- Matches: Nord: 380; Süd: 380
- Top goalscorer: Nord: Horst Hrubesch (42 goals); Süd: Emanuel Günther (27 goals)
- Average attendance: Nord: 5,617; Süd: 5,240

The 1977–78 2. Bundesliga season was the fourth season of the 2. Bundesliga, the second tier of the German football league system. It was played in two regional divisions, Nord and Süd.

Arminia Bielefeld, Darmstadt 98 and 1. FC Nürnberg were promoted to the Bundesliga while 1. FC Bocholt, OSC Bremerhaven, Schwarz-Weiß Essen, FC Bayern Hof, VfR 1910 Bürstadt, Kickers Würzburg and FK Pirmasens were relegated to the Oberligas.

== Nord ==
For the 1977–78 season saw 1. FC Bocholt, OSC Bremerhaven and Rot-Weiß Lüdenscheid promoted to the 2. Bundesliga from the Oberliga and Amateurligas while Tennis Borussia Berlin and Rot-Weiss Essen had been relegated to the 2. Bundesliga Nord from the Bundesliga.

=== League table ===
Pos	Team	Pld	W	D	L	GF	GA	GD	Pts	Promotion, qualification or relegation
1	Arminia Bielefeld (C, P)	38	23	5	10	74	40	+34	51	Promotion to Bundesliga
2	Rot-Weiss Essen	38	21	8	9	82	49	+33	50	Qualification to promotion play-offs
3	Preußen Münster	38	18	13	7	65	47	+18	49	
4	Fortuna Köln	38	19	10	9	79	62	+17	48	
5	Hannover 96	38	19	5	14	68	57	+11	43	
6	SG Wattenscheid 09	38	16	9	13	76	65	+11	41	
7	KFC Uerdingen	38	15	11	12	75	64	+11	41	
8	Bayer Leverkusen	38	16	7	15	58	51	+7	39	
9	SG Union Solingen	38	13	13	12	60	60	0	39	
10	Tennis Borussia Berlin	38	12	12	14	58	57	+1	36	
11	Wuppertaler SV	38	12	12	14	56	59	−3	36	
12	Westfalia Herne	38	12	11	15	53	59	−6	35	
13	Rot-Weiß Lüdenscheid	38	12	11	15	59	75	−16	35	
14	Alemannia Aachen	38	10	14	14	51	62	−11	34	
15	Arminia Hannover	38	12	10	16	63	78	−15	34	
16	VfL Osnabrück	38	9	15	14	56	62	−6	33	
17	SC Herford (R)	38	12	9	17	51	58	−7	33	Relegation to Oberliga
18	1. FC Bocholt (R)	38	13	6	19	65	70	−5	32	Relegation to Oberliga
19	OSC Bremerhaven (R)	38	11	10	17	61	88	−27	32	Relegation to Oberliga
20	Schwarz-Weiss Essen (R)	38	4	11	23	45	92	−47	19	Relegation to Oberliga

Source: Bundesliga.de
Rules for classification: 1) points; 2) goal difference; 3) number of goals scored.
(C) Champions; (P) Promoted; (R) Relegated

=== Results ===
Home \ Away	AAC	TBB	DSC	BHO	OSC	RWE	SWE	H96	SVA	HER	SCW	FKO	B04	RWL	PRM	OSN	SGU	B05	SGW	WSV
Alemannia Aachen	—	1–4	1–2	3–0	0–1	0–1	4–1	1–1	1–0	5–3	1–1	3–0	1–0	3–4	0–0	3–2	3–3	3–3	0–1	1–0
Tennis Borussia Berlin	2–2	—	3–2	1–0	3–1	1–2	1–0	3–2	6–0	3–2	2–1	1–3	1–0	1–1	1–2	0–0	3–0	1–1	1–0	0–0
Arminia Bielefeld	2–0	4–1	—	2–3	4–1	2–2	3–0	2–0	6–0	2–0	2–0	2–4	1–3	4–0	2–0	3–3	3–0	3–1	2–0	3–1
1. FC Bocholt	3–0	4–3	5–0	—	3–1	4–3	3–1	3–0	2–2	0–2	2–0	3–1	2–1	3–0	1–1	0–0	0–1	2–2	0–2	1–0
OSC Bremerhaven	2–1	3–3	0–3	3–2	—	0–1	2–1	1–0	4–1	2–1	2–2	1–3	1–2	2–2	2–3	1–1	5–2	2–4	1–1	0–0
Rot-Weiss Essen	3–1	4–3	2–0	4–1	6–1	—	4–0	3–1	4–0	2–0	1–2	2–1	3–2	3–1	4–4	4–1	2–0	1–0	1–1	6–0
Schwarz-Weiß Essen	0–0	2–2	0–1	1–1	3–3	3–3	—	3–4	2–4	0–3	2–2	2–2	1–2	0–1	1–1	3–2	1–1	2–1	0–3	4–2
Hannover 96	1–1	1–0	1–0	2–1	1–2	0–1	3–1	—	1–2	3–1	1–2	3–1	1–3	2–1	0–0	4–2	2–2	2–0	4–1	1–1
Arminia Hannover	3–3	1–1	0–0	6–4	3–4	0–0	5–1	0–1	—	0–1	2–0	2–1	1–1	0–0	1–1	2–0	3–1	2–2	3–4	3–0
SC Herford	0–0	1–1	2–0	3–0	1–1	1–1	3–0	1–2	0–2	—	2–0	1–4	0–0	4–0	1–1	3–1	0–2	3–2	1–2	1–1
Westfalia Herne	0–1	2–0	2–0	2–1	3–2	2–0	1–1	2–4	2–3	1–2	—	2–2	4–1	3–0	0–0	3–1	1–0	0–2	2–1	1–1
Fortuna Köln	1–1	2–1	0–2	4–2	4–1	3–1	3–2	3–2	3–1	3–1	3–1	—	1–0	2–0	4–3	1–1	2–2	3–2	2–2	2–1
Bayer Leverkusen	0–1	2–1	1–2	2–0	3–1	1–2	2–1	1–0	4–0	0–0	2–1	1–1	—	0–4	1–0	0–2	0–2	7–0	0–0	2–0
Rot-Weiß Lüdenscheid	2–2	2–1	1–4	4–2	4–1	3–2	1–1	2–5	1–1	3–0	0–0	1–1	3–1	—	1–1	2–4	1–0	1–0	3–2	3–3
Preußen Münster	1–1	0–0	0–1	3–2	3–0	2–0	3–0	3–1	3–2	2–1	2–2	3–1	0–1	4–1	—	3–0	1–1	1–4	1–0	1–0
VfL Osnabrück	1–1	0–0	0–0	2–1	2–2	1–1	6–1	1–3	3–0	0–1	2–2	2–2	3–2	2–0	0–2	—	1–1	1–2	3–1	2–1
Union Solingen	3–0	2–0	0–0	2–1	2–0	1–1	2–0	3–2	5–3	3–3	2–1	0–3	2–3	3–1	3–4	1–1	—	0–0	5–2	1–1
Bayer Uerdingen	5–2	2–0	0–2	3–2	7–1	1–0	3–1	1–3	1–2	3–1	4–1	1–0	1–1	3–2	2–3	0–0	1–1	—	2–2	3–3
SG Wattenscheid	3–0	4–2	0–2	1–1	2–2	3–2	4–0	0–1	3–2	3–0	2–2	5–2	3–3	3–1	3–0	5–3	3–1	2–5	—	0–2
Wuppertaler SV	3–0	1–1	3–1	2–0	1–2	2–0	1–3	2–3	2–1	3–1	3–0	1–1	4–3	2–2	2–3	1–0	2–0	1–1	3–2	—

Source: DFB
Legend: Blue = home team win; Yellow = draw; Red = away team win.

=== Top scorers ===
The league's top scorers:

Goals	Player	Team
42	(Germany) Horst Hrubesch	Rot-Weiss Essen
25	(Germany) Friedhelm Funkel	Bayer Uerdingen
24	(Germany) Karl-Heinz Mrosko	Arminia Hannover
21	(Sweden) Jan Mattsson	Bayer Uerdingen
19	(Germany) Werner Lenz	SG Union Solingen
18	(Germany) Volker Graul	Fortuna Köln
18	(Germany) Heinz-Josef Kehr	Tennis Borussia Berlin
16	(Germany) Hans-Günter Bruns	SG Wattenscheid 09
16	(Germany) Norbert Eilenfeldt	Arminia Bielefeld
16	(Germany) Ewald Hammes	SG Wattenscheid 09
16	(Germany) Karl-Heinz Mödrath	Fortuna Köln
16	(Germany) Hans-Günther Plücken	SG Union Solingen
16	(Germany) Winfried Stradt	Tennis Borussia Berlin

== Süd ==
For the 1977–78 season saw Freiburger FC, Kickers Würzburg, VfR Oli Bürstadt and Wormatia Worms promoted to the 2. Bundesliga from the Amateurligas and Karlsruher SC relegated to the 2. Bundesliga Süd from the Bundesliga.

=== League table ===
Pos	Team	Pld	W	D	L	GF	GA	GD	Pts	Promotion, qualification or relegation
1	Darmstadt 98 (C, P)	38	26	6	6	90	43	+47	58	Promotion to Bundesliga
2	1. FC Nürnberg (P)	38	22	9	7	75	46	+29	53	Qualification to promotion play-offs
3	FC Homburg	38	20	9	9	65	45	+20	49	
4	SpVgg Bayreuth	38	22	4	12	79	50	+29	48	
5	Kickers Offenbach	38	18	10	10	88	54	+34	46	
6	SpVgg Fürth	38	19	8	11	73	42	+31	46	
7	Karlsruher SC	38	20	5	13	76	54	+22	45	
8	Waldhof Mannheim	38	15	12	11	76	50	+26	42	
9	Wormatia Worms	38	16	10	12	63	56	+7	42	
10	Stuttgarter Kickers	38	14	12	12	63	71	−8	40	
11	FV Würzburg	38	13	12	13	52	53	−1	38	
12	Eintracht Trier	38	14	7	17	58	64	−6	35	
13	Freiburger FC	38	12	11	15	58	71	−13	35	
14	FC Augsburg	38	12	10	16	57	54	+3	34	
15	FSV Frankfurt	38	11	12	15	54	62	−8	34	
16	KSV Baunatal	38	13	8	17	55	80	−25	34	
17	Bayern Hof (R)	38	13	7	18	45	62	−17	33	Relegation to Oberliga
18	VfR Bürstadt (R)	38	10	5	23	48	68	−20	25	Relegation to Oberliga
19	Würzburger Kickers (R)	38	4	9	25	38	93	−55	17	Relegation to Oberliga
20	FK Pirmasens (R)	38	1	4	33	25	120	−95	6	Relegation to Oberliga

Source: Bundesliga.de
Rules for classification: 1) points; 2) goal difference; 3) number of goals scored.
(C) Champions; (P) Promoted; (R) Relegated

=== Results ===
Home \ Away	FCA	BAU	BAY	BUE	D98	FSV	FFC	FUE	HOF	HOM	KSC	FCN	KOF	FKP	SKI	TRI	CWA	W08	FVW	FCW
FC Augsburg	—	1–0	1–2	2–1	0–3	5–0	1–0	0–0	1–1	4–0	2–3	0–0	1–1	8–0	2–3	3–0	0–1	2–1	1–1	3–2
KSV Baunatal	2–0	—	3–2	2–0	0–1	4–2	2–2	2–1	1–1	0–0	1–0	1–5	2–1	3–2	3–3	3–0	2–2	1–3	1–0	4–1
SpVgg Bayreuth	0–2	4–1	—	5–1	3–0	3–0	2–0	3–1	3–0	2–0	3–0	1–0	3–3	7–1	5–1	2–1	2–2	5–0	2–1	2–0
VfR Bürstadt	4–1	3–1	1–3	—	1–2	2–0	0–0	2–2	0–1	1–0	0–1	1–2	0–1	2–1	0–1	1–2	0–0	1–0	0–3	3–0
Darmstadt 98	3–2	6–1	1–0	3–1	—	2–1	6–1	2–0	4–1	3–1	3–2	2–0	4–1	2–0	2–2	3–1	0–4	4–0	2–0	6–0
FSV Frankfurt	3–0	2–1	3–1	3–3	4–0	—	1–0	0–0	2–1	2–2	2–1	1–1	1–1	4–0	3–1	3–2	0–1	1–1	1–2	3–0
Freiburger FC	2–2	3–2	2–2	0–1	0–3	2–1	—	1–1	3–2	3–2	2–2	0–0	3–3	5–0	1–0	3–1	2–1	1–2	2–0	4–1
SpVgg Fürth	0–0	2–0	0–0	4–0	2–0	4–0	6–2	—	4–1	2–3	2–0	0–2	3–2	5–0	4–1	2–0	3–1	3–2	3–0	2–0
Bayern Hof	1–0	1–2	2–1	2–0	0–1	2–1	3–2	3–1	—	1–0	2–3	4–0	1–0	1–1	1–1	1–2	1–1	1–1	0–0	2–1
FC Homburg	2–0	5–0	1–0	1–0	1–1	2–1	6–1	2–1	2–0	—	3–0	2–2	1–1	4–2	0–2	3–0	3–2	4–0	3–2	1–0
Karlsruher SC	2–0	3–2	4–1	4–0	2–0	4–3	1–2	1–1	3–0	2–3	—	3–1	5–3	1–0	3–0	2–2	2–1	0–2	3–0	6–0
1. FC Nürnberg	2–1	2–0	3–2	2–1	6–4	1–1	3–1	2–1	3–0	2–0	2–1	—	2–0	2–0	4–1	3–0	1–3	3–1	3–1	4–1
Kickers Offenbach	2–0	5–0	3–1	7–0	1–1	0–0	3–0	3–1	3–0	1–1	2–1	0–0	—	4–1	7–0	4–0	3–1	2–1	4–0	5–0
FK Pirmasens	0–1	1–2	1–2	0–9	1–6	3–0	0–2	1–3	0–2	1–1	1–2	0–3	1–3	—	2–2	0–4	0–5	1–2	0–1	2–2
Stuttgarter Kickers	2–1	3–1	4–0	2–1	1–4	4–1	2–2	0–4	2–0	0–1	1–1	3–3	2–2	3–0	—	1–0	1–1	1–0	3–1	2–2
Eintracht Trier	2–2	1–1	0–2	2–1	1–2	0–0	1–0	2–1	5–1	4–0	1–4	2–2	3–0	5–0	1–0	—	3–2	2–0	1–1	0–0
SV Chio Waldhof	4–4	5–0	1–2	4–0	0–0	2–0	3–0	0–0	3–2	0–2	0–1	2–1	4–3	4–2	2–2	3–1	—	1–2	6–0	1–1
Wormatia Worms	0–0	4–1	4–0	2–1	2–2	1–1	1–1	3–1	2–1	0–0	3–2	2–2	3–0	2–0	2–1	6–3	1–1	—	1–2	3–0
FV Würzburg 04	3–2	1–1	2–0	0–0	0–0	2–2	2–2	1–2	2–0	1–1	2–0	0–1	4–0	4–0	1–1	2–0	1–1	3–2	—	4–0
Würzburger Kickers	1–2	2–2	0–1	2–6	0–2	1–1	2–1	0–1	1–2	1–2	1–1	3–0	3–4	2–0	3–4	0–3	2–1	1–1	2–2	—

Source: DFB
Legend: Blue = home team win; Yellow = draw; Red = away team win.

=== Top scorers ===
The league's top scorers:

Goals	Player	Team
27	(Germany) Emanuel Günther	Karlsruher SC
25	(Germany) Peter Cestonaro	SV Darmstadt 98
25	(Germany) Uwe Sommerer	SpVgg Bayreuth
21	(Germany) Georg Beichle	FC Augsburg
21	(Germany) Manfred Drexler	SV Darmstadt 98
21	(Germany) Werner Seubert	VfR Wormatia Worms
21	(Germany) Erich Unger	SpVgg Fürth
18	(Germany) Klaus Heinlein	SpVgg Fürth
18	(Germany) Hans-Otto Jordan	VfR 1910 Bürstadt
16	(Germany) Lothar Leiendecker	Eintracht Trier

== Promotion play-offs ==
The final place in the Bundesliga was contested between the two runners-up in the Nord and Süd divisions. 1. FC Nürnberg won on aggregate and were promoted to the Bundesliga.

Team 1	Agg.	Team 2	1st leg	2nd leg
1. FC Nürnberg (S)	3–2	Rot-Weiss Essen (N)	1–0	2–2
