= Reiner Calmund =

German football executive (born 1948)

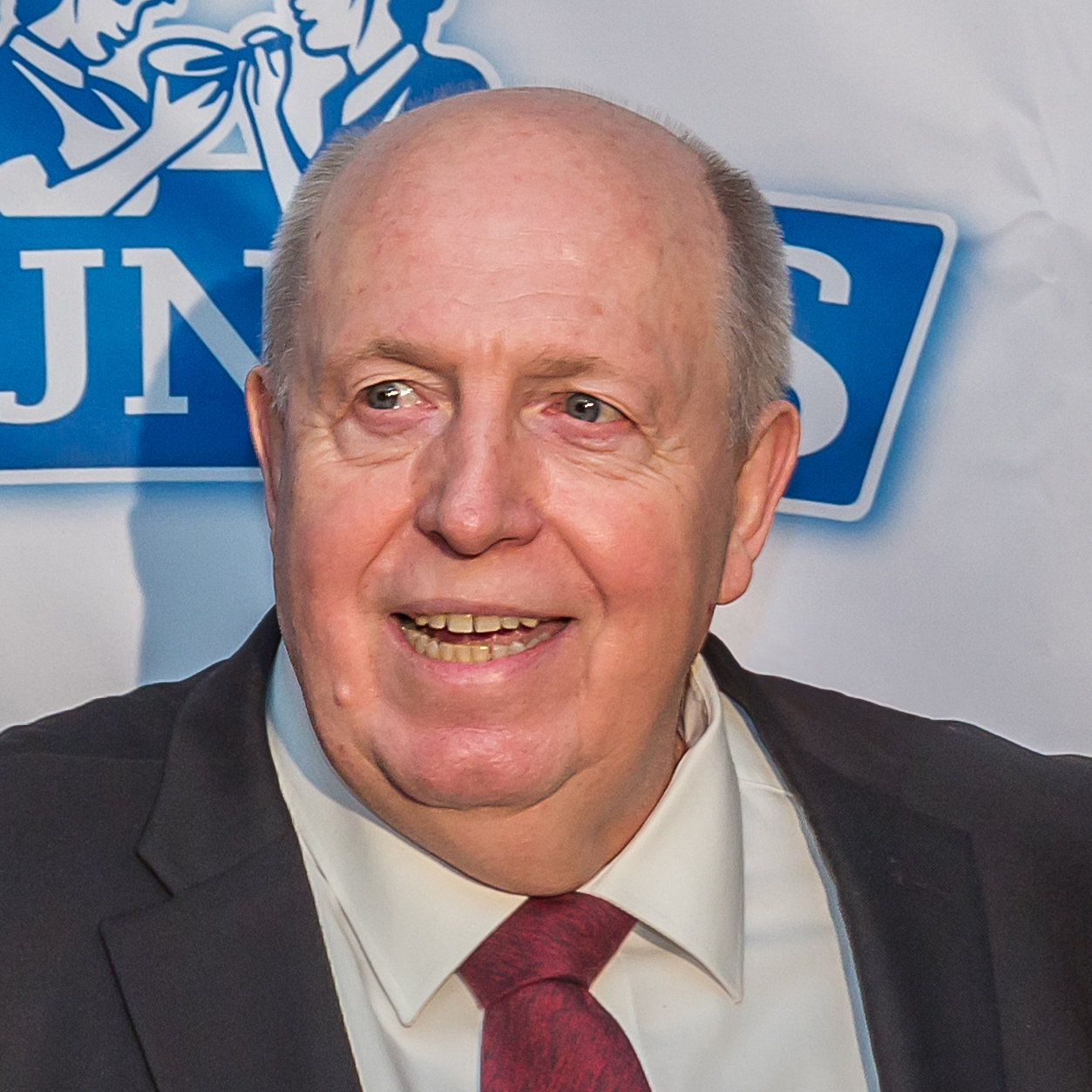
- Calmund in 2017

Personal information
- Full name: Reinhold Calmund
- Date of birth: 23 November 1948 (age 77)
- Place of birth: Brühl, North Rhine-Westphalia, Germany

Managerial career
- Years: Team
- 1976–2004: Bayer 04 Leverkusen

Reinhold "Reiner" Calmund (born 23 November 1948) is a German retired football executive. He was the managing director of Bundesliga club Bayer Leverkusen from 1976 to 2004 and most recently from 1999 worked as the first managing director of Fußball GmbH, which had previously been spun off from TSV Bayer 04 Leverkusen. Calli, as he is also known, is now active as a football expert, TV presenter and author. His brand, which made him known to the public beyond football, includes his strong Rhineland accent and, before his weight loss in 2020, being obese.

== Early life and career ==
Calmund played football professionally with SpVg Frechen 20 until 1966, when a serious injury forced him to quit. The following year, he became a youth coach for several football clubs, part of the Middle Rhine Football Association in Rhein-Efert district, including Frechen 20, STV Lövenich, BC Efferen, and SC Brühl. He completed the training to be a commercial clerk and studied business administration. From 1974 to 1976, he was assistant coach, under Fritz Pott, for SC Brühl. In 1975, the SC Brühl was able to participate in the final round of the German Amateur Championship.

== Career with Bayer Leverkusen ==
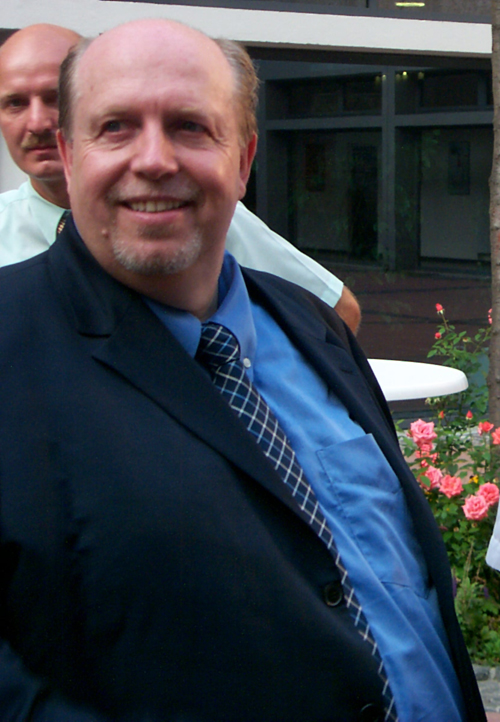
Calmund in 2002

Calmund started working at Bayer 04 Leverkusen in 1976 as a youth leader and announcer. Then, until 1988, he was a board member. Afterwards he was manager of the professional football department. Calmund became Managing Director of Bayer Leverkusen in 1999.

Leverkusen's greatest success during Calmund's tenure was winning the UEFA Cup in 1988 and the German Cup in 1993. In addition, Leverkusen were runners-up four (1997, 1999, 2000, 2002) times for the Meisterschaft, as well as once for the Champions League final.(2002). Especially in the 2001/2002 season, when Leverkusen finished second in the Bundesliga, DFB Cup and Champions League, earned the club the nickname "Vizekusen".

Calmund was one of the first to realize the possibility of recruiting top players in East Germany as soon as the Berlin Wall fell on 9 November 1989. He arranged the recruitment of Andreas Thom from BFC Dynamo. The transfer was made public on 16 December 1989. Andreas Thom became the first player in the DDR-Oberliga to be transferred to the Bundesliga. Calmund soon also arranged the signing of Ulf Kirsten from SG Dynamo Dresden. He has said: "The GDR had top class youth academies with full-time coaches, stuff that we in the West could only dream of in the 1980s". Calmund is considered a prime mover in mining East Germany for talent during the period known as Die Wende. Calmund was also responsible for the signings of Bernd Schuster, Michael Ballack, and Rudi Völler. Additionally, he was able to win the Brazilians Paulo Sérgio, Jorginho, Emerson, Zé Roberto, Lúcio and Juan, as well as Bulgarian Dimitar Berbatov for the club.

On 8 June 2004, Calmund announced – for health reasons – his resignation as CEO of Bayer 04 Leverkusen for 30 June 2004. It became public in March 2006 that Calmund had been laid off by the club. The reason being an unexplained cash payment of €580,000 to the Bielefeld player's agent, Volker Graul, allegedly to purchase two Croatian players who never committed. In addition, Calmund claims to have paid Graul, at the request of Bayer Leverkusen, €350,000 from his private assets. The Cologne public prosecutor held proceedings against Calmund for a breach of trust, but the matter was settled with the payment of a €30,000 fine .

== Other activities ==
From 26 October 2004 to 4 January 2005, Calmund hosted the show Big Boss at RTL, an adaptation of the US show The Apprentice, with Donald Trump as a mentor.

On 25 April 2005, Calmund was elected to the Supervisory Board of Fortuna Düsseldorf.

He was involved as an ambassador for people with disabilities in Germany for the 2006 FIFA World Cup.

On 4 August 2007, he received the "Golden Schlemmerente" in Wassenberg for his achievements in cooking.

Calmund was an honorary ambassador for North Rhine-Westphalia for the 2006 FIFA World Cup and "International Championship Ambassador 2008 Klagenfurt".

From 1 February 2008, Calmund presented a video blog on his website Calli.tv, in which he published his weekly assessments of the respective Bundesliga match day and other football events. On the phone, he explained the course of the football world to an imaginary interlocutor. The website is now offline. From 2008 he was on the advisory board of the now defunct Austrian club SK Austria Kärnten.

On 15 June 2010, it was announced that Calmund would be a consultant for Dynamo Dresden. He stated that he wanted to "create clean, professional structures". This commitment was to be free for the city of Dresden, which has a say in the club, and the club itself.

Since 2015, Calmund has been a sports advisor to the Hamburg entrepreneur Klaus-Michael Kühne, who has a say in player transfers from Hamburger SV. He works in an advisory capacity for the German Sport University Cologne and the Sportstotal GmbH agency. He wrote a weekly column in the daily newspaper Express.

In the 2017/2018 Bundesliga season, Calmund worked as an expert in reporting on the pay-TV channel Sky.

== Personal life ==
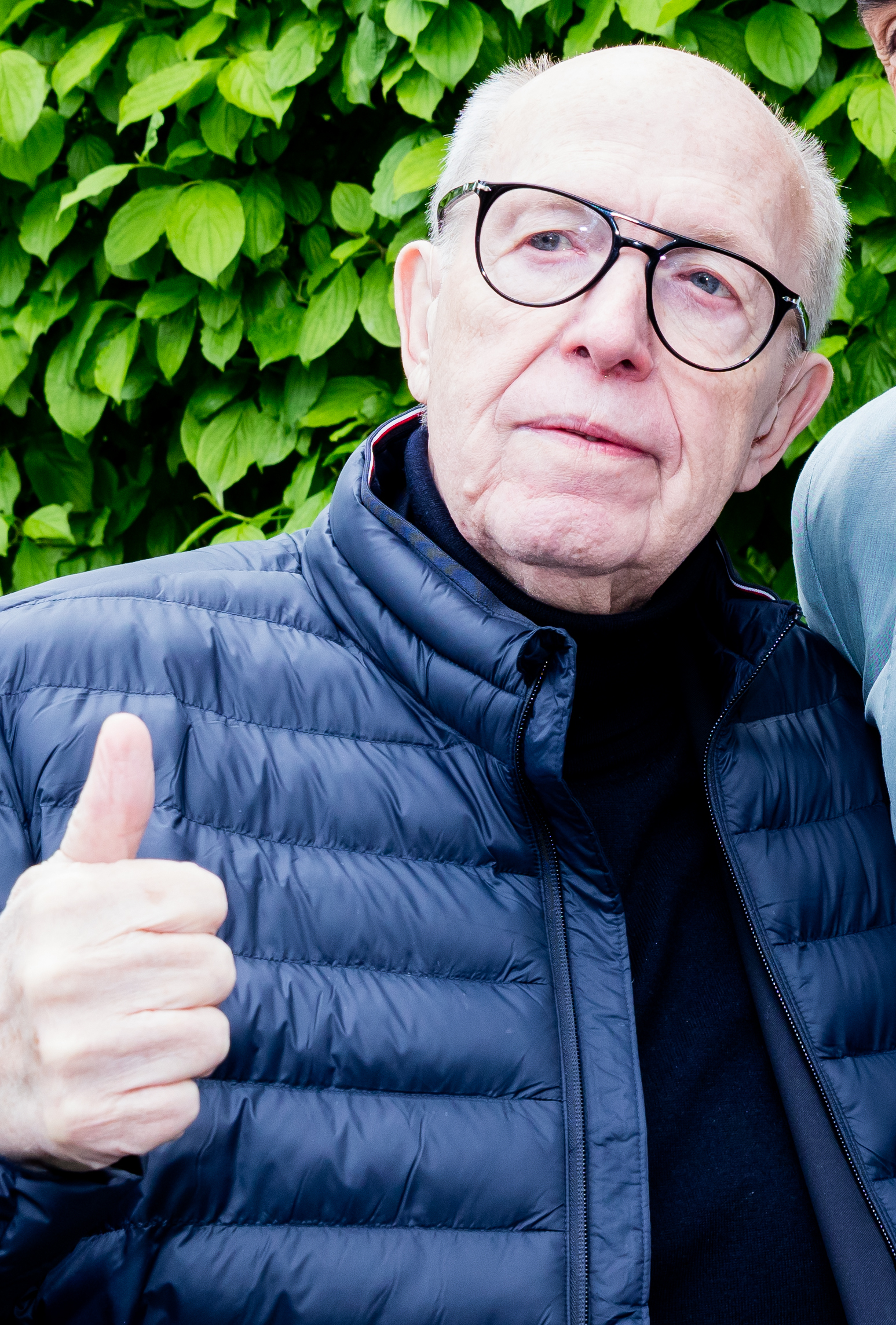
Calmund in 2025

September 2003, Calmund married for the third time. In 2013, Reiner and Sylvia Calmund adopted a two-year-old girl. He also has five children and three grandchildren from his first two marriages.

Calmund has lived in Saarlouis since 2012.

According to Calmund, he once weighed 180 kilograms. He undertook several diet attempts, which, however, led to weight gain in the medium term due to the yo-yo effect. In January 2020, Calmund underwent a stomach reduction surgery. According to his own statement, he lost a total of 69 kg as a result by December 2020. In 2021, the "fat apron" was finally removed, which he says reduced his weight to 90 kilograms.

== Publications ==
- Fußballbekloppt! Autobiographie. Bertelsmann, Munich 2008, ISBN 978-3-570-01061-7.
- Eine Kalorie kommt selten allein, Mosaik 2011, ISBN 978-3-442-39216-2.
