= Heinlein =

Heinlein or Henlein is a German surname. Notable people with the surname include:

- Karl Heinlein (1892–1960), Austrian footballer
- Klaus Heinlein (born 1953), German footballer
- Konrad Henlein (1898–1945), Nazi German politician
- Martina Heinlein (born 1981), German field hockey player
- Max Hussarek von Heinlein (1865–1935), Austrian politician, Prime Minister in 1918
- Peter Henlein (1479/80–1542), German locksmith and watchmaker, often considered the inventor of the portable timepiece
- Robert A. Heinlein (1907–1988), American science fiction writer
- Virginia Heinlein (1916–2003), third wife of Robert A
