= Hans-Jürgen Baake =

German footballer (born 1954)

Personal information
- Full name: Hans-Jürgen Baake
- Date of birth: 2 March 1954 (age 72)
- Place of birth: West Germany
- Positions: Defender; midfielder

Youth career
- –1972: MSV Duisburg

Senior career*
Years	Team	Apps	(Gls)
1972–1974	VfL Osnabrück		
1974–1976	Wuppertaler SV	53	(4)
1976–1978	Tennis Borussia Berlin	57	(3)
1980	Hertha BSC	7	(0)
Total		117	(7)
- * Club domestic league appearances and goals

Hans-Jürgen Baake (born 2 March 1954) is a retired German footballer.

== Playing career ==
Baake played for MSV Duisburg in his youth before earning his first professional contract at VfL Osnabrück in 1972 and getting promoted to the 2. Bundesliga in 1974. After his time in Lower Saxony, Baake moved to Bundesliga side Wuppertaler SV for a further two years, but was relegated after just one season. His stalwart performances attracted Tennis Borussia Berlin where he played between 1976 and 1978, making 57 appearances for the Veilchen. In 1980, Baake moved to city rivals Hertha BSC. Aged 26 and after only his seventh league game for Hertha, Baake was forced to retire from football, following an injury sustained by Borussia Dortmund's Miroslav Votava.
