= Franz Raschid =

German footballer and manager

Personal information
- Date of birth: 18 October 1954
- Place of birth: Linz am Rhein, West Germany
- Date of death: 22 October 2010 (aged 56)
- Place of death: Essen, Germany
- Height: 1.76 m (5 ft 9 1/2 in)
- Position: Left midfielder

Senior career*
| Years | Team | Apps | (Gls) |
| 1974–1988 | Bayer Uerdingen | 364 | (51) |

Managerial career
- 1990–1991: Arminia Bielefeld
- * Club domestic league appearances and goals

Franz Raschid (18 October 1954 – 22 October 2010) was a German professional football player and manager.

== Career ==
Raschid, who played as a left midfielder, spent his entire professional career with Bayer Uerdingen, scoring 51 goals in 364 League appearances. He later became a football manager, taking control of Arminia Bielefeld between 1990 and 1991.

== Death ==
Raschid died on 22 October 2010, aged 56, from pancreatic cancer.
