= Detlef Bruckhoff =

German footballer

Personal information
- Date of birth: 8 April 1958 (age 68)
- Place of birth: West Germany
- Position: Forward

Senior career*
Years	Team	Apps	(Gls)
1976–1978	Tennis Borussia Berlin	18	(0)
1978–1980	Würzburger FV	63	(9)
1980–1982	Darmstadt 98	39	(6)
1982–1984	SC Neusiedl am See		
1984–1985	SC Eisenstadt		
1985–1988	1860 Munich	89	(29)
Total		209	(44)
- * Club domestic league appearances and goals

Detlef Bruckhoff (born 8 April 1958) is a German former professional footballer who played as a forward. He made a total of 16 Bundesliga appearances for Tennis Borussia Berlin and Darmstadt 98.
