= 1976–77 2. Bundesliga =

3rd season of the second-tier football league in Germany

2. Bundesliga
- Season: 1976–77
- Champions: Nord: FC St. Pauli; Süd: VfB Stuttgart
- Promoted: Nord: FC St. Pauli; Süd: VfB Stuttgart; TSV 1860 Munich
- Relegated: Nord: Bonner SC; Göttingen 05; Wacker 04 Berlin; VfL Wolfsburg; Süd: Röchling Völklingen; Jahn Regensburg; BSV Schwenningen
- Matches: Nord: 380; Süd: 380
- Top goalscorer: Nord: Franz Gerber (27 goals); Süd: Lothar Emmerich (24 goals)
- Average attendance: Nord: 6,048; Süd: 7,618

The 1976–77 2. Bundesliga season was the third season of the 2. Bundesliga, the second tier of the German football league system. It was played in two regional divisions, Nord and Süd.

FC St. Pauli, VfB Stuttgart and TSV 1860 Munich were promoted to the Bundesliga while Bonner SC, Göttingen 05, Wacker 04 Berlin, VfL Wolfsburg, Röchling Völklingen, Jahn Regensburg and BSV Schwenningen were relegated to the Oberligas and Amateurligas.

== Nord ==
For the 1976–77 season saw Arminia Hannover, Bonner SC, SC Herford and VfL Wolfsburg promoted to the 2. Bundesliga from the Oberliga and Amateurligas while Bayer 05 Uerdingen and Hannover 96 had been relegated to the 2. Bundesliga Nord from the Bundesliga.

=== League table ===
Pos	Team	Pld	W	D	L	GF	GA	GD	Pts	Promotion, qualification or relegation
1	FC St. Pauli (C, P)	38	19	16	3	69	36	+33	54	Promotion to Bundesliga
2	Arminia Bielefeld	38	19	12	7	72	39	+33	50	Qualification for promotion play-offs
3	Wuppertaler SV	38	18	11	9	81	55	+26	47	
4	Bayer 05 Uerdingen	38	16	11	11	78	52	+26	43	
5	Hannover 96	38	18	7	13	73	48	+25	43	
6	Preußen Münster	38	15	13	10	73	52	+21	43	
7	Alemannia Aachen	38	16	11	11	69	56	+13	43	
8	Schwarz-Weiss Essen	38	16	11	11	63	55	+8	43	
9	VfL Osnabrück	38	18	7	13	84	77	+7	43	
10	Bayer Leverkusen	38	14	12	12	59	58	+1	40	
11	Westfalia Herne	38	15	9	14	77	73	+4	39	
12	Fortuna Köln	38	14	10	14	67	62	+5	38	
13	Arminia Hannover	38	15	8	15	64	62	+2	38	
14	SC Herford	38	12	12	14	62	63	−1	36	
15	SG Wattenscheid 09	38	12	9	17	65	80	−15	33	
16	Bonner SC (Note: Bonner SC were not granted a license for the following season by the DFB and were therefore relegated.) (R)	38	14	5	19	53	72	−19	33	Relegation to Oberliga
17	1. SC Göttingen 05 (Note: SC Göttingen 05 waived their league place, which they would have retained after the license revocation of Bonner SC.) (R)	38	11	9	18	57	67	−10	31	Relegation to Oberliga
18	Wacker 04 Berlin (R)	38	9	9	20	43	79	−36	27	Relegation to Oberliga
19	SG Union Solingen	38	6	8	24	46	96	−50	20	
20	VfL Wolfsburg (R)	38	5	6	27	46	119	−73	16	Relegation to Oberliga

Source: Bundesliga.de
Rules for classification: 1) points; 2) goal difference; 3) number of goals scored.
(C) Champions; (P) Promoted; (R) Relegated

=== Results ===
Home \ Away	AAC	W04	DSC	BON	SWE	G05	H96	SVA	HER	SCW	FKO	B04	PRM	OSN	SGU	STP	B05	SGW	WOB	WSV
Alemannia Aachen	—	5–1	0–1	3–1	2–0	4–3	3–2	3–0	4–1	3–1	3–2	2–0	1–1	0–1	4–0	1–1	1–1	2–3	3–1	2–2
Wacker 04 Berlin	2–3	—	0–1	1–0	1–2	0–0	2–0	2–2	3–2	2–0	1–2	1–0	2–2	2–2	3–2	1–2	1–1	0–3	1–0	1–3
Arminia Bielefeld	2–0	0–0	—	4–1	2–0	2–0	2–2	1–1	1–1	1–3	1–0	1–0	2–2	3–1	3–0	1–0	0–0	4–0	5–0	1–1
Bonner SC	1–1	2–1	2–1	—	1–0	0–2	1–0	2–0	3–0	3–2	2–3	1–0	2–1	2–3	4–1	1–1	1–2	2–0	2–3	4–0
Schwarz-Weiß Essen	0–0	3–1	0–2	1–0	—	0–0	1–1	0–1	3–2	3–3	3–2	1–0	2–0	3–1	4–1	0–0	1–0	4–4	2–0	3–1
Göttingen 05	1–3	0–1	1–0	1–2	2–3	—	2–1	1–3	1–2	1–1	3–1	2–3	2–2	0–0	1–0	0–0	2–1	2–1	9–0	5–3
Hannover 96	4–1	5–2	4–1	5–0	1–1	2–0	—	1–0	1–2	2–1	0–0	6–1	0–1	4–1	5–2	1–2	3–1	2–1	4–0	0–0
Arminia Hannover	0–1	2–1	1–3	2–1	3–2	3–1	1–2	—	1–1	2–6	2–0	4–1	2–1	1–3	6–0	0–0	1–1	4–0	3–2	3–1
SC Herford	2–1	5–0	2–2	0–0	1–4	1–1	2–2	1–1	—	2–3	2–0	1–3	1–3	5–2	1–1	0–1	1–0	3–1	5–1	2–0
Westfalia Herne	0–0	0–1	1–5	3–1	1–1	2–0	2–3	1–5	0–0	—	4–2	3–1	3–1	5–0	2–2	2–0	2–2	3–1	8–2	0–4
Fortuna Köln	1–1	1–0	1–1	5–0	2–2	7–2	0–2	4–0	3–1	3–1	—	3–2	0–4	3–2	4–3	0–0	3–3	1–1	3–1	0–2
Bayer Leverkusen	1–0	5–0	1–0	2–2	2–2	4–0	2–2	1–1	2–1	1–1	1–1	—	2–1	2–1	1–1	1–1	2–2	0–0	1–2	0–0
Preußen Münster	1–1	0–0	1–0	6–0	2–3	2–1	2–1	2–1	2–2	5–2	1–1	2–3	—	3–4	1–0	0–0	1–1	5–0	7–0	1–0
VfL Osnabrück	5–1	4–3	1–2	3–1	4–2	4–2	3–0	4–3	1–1	4–2	2–0	1–1	0–2	—	3–0	2–2	2–1	5–2	4–1	2–4
Union Solingen	2–4	1–1	1–4	1–1	1–3	1–2	1–0	2–1	4–3	0–1	0–1	1–4	1–2	3–0	—	3–3	1–3	2–1	2–2	1–2
FC St. Pauli	3–1	3–1	3–2	2–1	0–0	1–1	2–0	4–1	4–1	4–2	2–1	3–0	4–0	3–3	1–1	—	1–0	4–0	3–1	2–2
Bayer Uerdingen	2–1	6–1	2–2	2–1	3–1	2–0	2–1	4–1	0–1	0–1	3–1	2–3	2–2	3–4	6–0	0–1	—	4–1	3–2	2–1
SG Wattenscheid	2–2	4–0	2–5	4–0	2–0	3–1	1–2	0–0	1–1	1–2	2–2	3–1	1–1	4–2	3–0	2–4	0–4	—	5–2	1–0
VfL Wolfsburg	1–1	2–2	3–3	0–3	2–0	1–4	0–1	0–1	1–3	3–1	0–3	0–1	4–2	0–0	3–4	2–2	2–5	1–2	—	0–5
Wuppertaler SV	4–1	4–1	1–1	6–2	4–3	1–1	2–1	2–1	2–0	2–2	2–1	3–4	1–1	1–0	3–0	1–0	2–2	3–3	6–1	—

Source: DFB
Legend: Blue = home team win; Yellow = draw; Red = away team win.

=== Top scorers ===
The league's top scorers:

Goals	Player	Team
27	(Germany) Franz Gerber	FC St. Pauli
23	(Germany) Rainer Budde	Wuppertaler SV
23	(Germany) Heinz-Josef Kehr	Alemannia Aachen
23	(Germany) Gerd-Volker Schock	VfL Osnabrück
21	(Germany) Ewald Hammes	SG Wattenscheid 09
21	(Germany) Klaus Wunder	Hannover 96
19	(Germany) Karl-Heinz Mrosko	Arminia Hannover
18	(Germany) Wilfried Klinge	1. SC Göttingen 05
18	(Germany) Klaus Wolf	Preußen Münster
17	(Germany) Friedhelm Funkel	Bayer Uerdingen
17	(Germany) Jürgen Milewski	Hannover 96
17	(Germany) Frank-Michael Schonert	Bayer Leverkusen
17	(Germany) Wolfgang Wallek	VfL Wolfsburg

== Süd ==
For the 1976–77 season saw BSV Schwenningen, Eintracht Trier, FV Würzburg 04 and KSV Baunatal promoted to the 2. Bundesliga from the Amateurligas and Kickers Offenbach relegated to the 2. Bundesliga Süd from the Bundesliga.

=== League table ===
Pos	Team	Pld	W	D	L	GF	GA	GD	Pts	Promotion, qualification or relegation
1	VfB Stuttgart (C, P)	38	24	9	5	100	36	+64	57	Promotion to Bundesliga
2	1860 Munich (P)	38	24	8	6	78	29	+49	56	Qualification for promotion play-offs
3	Kickers Offenbach	38	22	9	7	86	52	+34	53	
4	FC Homburg	38	23	3	12	84	56	+28	49	
5	1. FC Nürnberg	38	18	13	7	77	51	+26	49	
6	Darmstadt 98	38	18	10	10	68	48	+20	46	
7	FSV Frankfurt	38	14	12	12	65	58	+7	40	
8	SpVgg Fürth	38	15	10	13	55	51	+4	40	
9	FC Augsburg	38	17	6	15	72	73	−1	40	
10	Stuttgarter Kickers	38	16	7	15	59	53	+6	39	
11	Waldhof Mannheim	38	16	5	17	70	57	+13	37	
12	Bayern Hof	38	12	13	13	61	53	+8	37	
13	FV Würzburg	38	14	9	15	49	81	−32	37	
14	SpVgg Bayreuth	38	12	10	16	60	64	−4	34	
15	KSV Baunatal	38	11	11	16	64	82	−18	33	
16	Röchling Völklingen (Note: SV Röchling Völklingen voluntarily returned their license for the following season to the DFB and were therefore relegated.) (R)	38	13	6	19	47	71	−24	32	Relegation to Oberliga
17	Eintracht Trier	38	12	4	22	46	68	−22	28	
18	FK Pirmasens	38	5	9	24	43	85	−42	19	
19	Jahn Regensburg (R)	38	7	5	26	42	87	−45	19	Relegation to Oberliga
20	BSV 07 Schwenningen (R)	38	4	7	27	31	102	−71	15	Relegation to Oberliga

Source: Bundesliga.de
Rules for classification: 1) points; 2) goal difference; 3) number of goals scored.
(C) Champions; (P) Promoted; (R) Relegated

=== Results ===
Home \ Away	FCA	BAU	BAY	D98	FSV	FUE	HOF	HOM	M60	FCN	KOF	FKP	JRE	SCH	SKI	VFB	TRI	SVR	CWA	FVW
FC Augsburg	—	3–1	5–1	2–2	1–1	1–2	2–1	3–2	1–3	1–1	0–0	2–0	3–0	3–0	2–1	1–4	0–1	2–1	1–0	5–1
KSV Baunatal	1–1	—	0–4	2–1	0–0	2–2	1–1	0–0	2–0	2–2	0–3	2–2	5–2	3–0	4–2	0–5	5–4	4–1	2–2	5–1
SpVgg Bayreuth	2–4	3–4	—	2–2	2–2	2–1	5–1	1–2	1–4	1–2	2–2	2–1	2–0	1–1	2–1	3–2	2–4	0–1	1–0	3–2
Darmstadt 98	1–0	3–2	1–0	—	1–0	1–0	1–0	3–3	0–1	1–1	1–2	5–3	4–0	6–1	1–0	2–1	5–2	3–0	4–1	0–1
FSV Frankfurt	2–3	2–1	1–1	3–1	—	2–3	1–0	4–0	2–2	3–1	2–2	2–0	1–0	5–0	1–1	0–0	0–2	1–1	2–1	5–1
SpVgg Fürth	1–1	2–0	1–1	1–0	2–1	—	2–2	3–0	1–0	0–2	0–2	3–2	4–0	2–0	0–1	0–0	3–2	4–1	3–1	2–0
Bayern Hof	7–2	3–0	0–3	0–1	0–0	3–1	—	2–3	0–0	1–1	3–0	1–0	2–1	10–1	0–1	2–1	2–0	1–1	1–0	4–0
FC Homburg	5–0	3–1	3–1	4–0	6–2	2–1	3–0	—	2–0	0–4	2–1	4–1	1–0	5–0	2–0	3–1	3–1	2–1	4–2	4–0
1860 Munich	3–0	2–1	2–1	2–2	6–0	1–0	2–2	1–0	—	3–0	4–0	0–2	2–0	3–0	3–1	0–0	2–0	6–0	1–0	4–0
1. FC Nürnberg	2–4	5–1	1–0	1–1	3–3	1–1	3–3	2–1	1–1	—	3–3	3–0	5–1	5–0	2–0	0–4	1–0	2–2	2–0	4–0
Kickers Offenbach	4–1	7–0	2–1	3–3	2–1	3–1	2–1	3–1	1–3	2–0	—	3–0	2–0	3–2	1–2	1–2	6–3	3–0	2–1	2–0
FK Pirmasens	0–3	2–5	0–0	3–3	1–1	1–1	0–0	1–2	1–4	1–3	2–2	—	1–2	2–2	3–2	0–4	4–1	0–1	0–1	0–2
Jahn Regensburg	5–1	0–0	3–4	1–0	1–3	2–2	0–0	0–1	1–3	0–3	2–5	0–4	—	4–1	0–1	3–0	2–1	0–1	4–2	2–3
BSV Schwenningen	0–1	2–3	1–1	0–2	2–3	0–1	2–2	2–1	0–1	0–2	0–1	2–1	3–2	—	0–5	3–3	1–3	2–1	1–1	0–1
Stuttgarter Kickers	1–0	3–1	1–1	1–0	2–1	2–2	1–1	4–3	0–3	3–3	0–1	3–2	3–1	1–0	—	0–0	0–0	4–0	2–1	8–1
VfB Stuttgart	4–1	3–1	0–0	1–1	2–0	3–0	2–0	5–1	3–2	4–0	2–2	7–2	8–0	6–0	2–1	—	1–0	4–3	4–3	4–0
Eintracht Trier	2–6	2–0	1–0	1–3	0–2	3–1	3–1	0–2	0–0	1–0	1–5	1–0	1–1	2–0	2–0	0–0	—	1–3	0–1	0–1
Röchling Völklingen	3–2	0–0	2–0	1–2	3–2	1–0	2–2	3–2	1–2	0–2	5–2	0–1	0–0	2–1	1–0	0–3	1–0	—	1–2	1–2
SV Chio Waldhof	5–2	2–2	1–2	1–0	3–2	4–1	4–0	2–1	2–1	1–2	0–0	6–0	2–0	3–0	3–0	1–2	3–1	4–1	—	3–3
FV Würzburg 04	3–2	2–1	3–2	1–1	1–2	1–1	1–2	1–1	1–1	2–2	1–1	0–0	3–2	1–1	3–1	0–3	1–0	3–1	2–1	—

Source: DFB
Legend: Blue = home team win; Yellow = draw; Red = away team win.

=== Top scorers ===
The league's top scorers:

Goals	Player	Team
24	(Germany) Lothar Emmerich	FV Würzburg 04
23	(Germany) Werner Heck	SV Waldhof Mannheim
23	(Germany) Manfred Lenz	FC 08 Homburg
22	(Germany) Ottmar Hitzfeld	VfB Stuttgart
21	(Germany) Werner Hofmann	FSV Frankfurt
21	(Germany) Hans Walitza	1. FC Nürnberg
20	(Germany) Harald Diener	FC 08 Homburg
18	(Germany) Wolfgang Rausch	Kickers Offenbach
17	(Germany) Peter Falter	TSV 1860 Munich
17	(Germany) Erhard Hofeditz	KSV 1964 Baunatal

== Promotion play-offs ==
The final place in the Bundesliga was contested between the two runners-up in the Nord and Süd divisions. TSV 1860 Munich were promoted to the Bundesliga after a third game was made necessary to decide the series.

Team 1	Agg.	Team 2	1st leg	2nd leg	3rd leg
Arminia Bielefeld (N)	4–6	TSV 1860 Munich (S)	4–0	0–4	0–2
