= 1974–75 2. Bundesliga =

Inaugural season of the second-tier football league in Germany

2. Bundesliga
- Season: 1974–75
- Champions: Nord: Hannover 96; Süd: Karlsruher SC
- Promoted: Nord: Hannover 96; Bayer 05 Uerdingen; Süd: Karlsruher SC
- Relegated: Nord: Olympia Wilhelmshaven; Rot-Weiß Oberhausen; VfL Wolfsburg; HSV Barmbek-Uhlenhorst; Süd: VfR Heilbronn; Borussia Neunkirchen; VfR Wormatia Worms; VfR Mannheim
- Matches played: Nord: 380; Süd: 380
- Top goalscorer: Nord: Volker Graul (29 goals); Süd: Bernd Hoffmann (25 goals)
- Average attendance: Nord: 6,818; Süd: 8,356

The 1974–75 2. Bundesliga season was the inaugural season of the 2. Bundesliga, the second tier of the German football league system. It was played in two regional divisions, Nord and Süd.

Hannover 96, Bayer 05 Uerdingen and Karlsruher SC were promoted to the Bundesliga while Olympia Wilhelmshaven, Rot-Weiß Oberhausen, VfL Wolfsburg, HSV Barmbek-Uhlenhorst, VfR Heilbronn, Borussia Neunkirchen, VfR Wormatia Worms and VfR Mannheim were relegated to the Oberligas and Amateurligas.

== Nord ==
=== League table ===
For the 1974–75 season saw no team promoted to the new 2. Bundesliga from the Amateurligas while Hannover 96 and SC Fortuna Köln had been relegated to the 2. Bundesliga Nord from the Bundesliga.

| Pos | Team | Pld | W | D | L | GF | GA | GD | Pts | Promotion, qualification or relegation |
|---|---|---|---|---|---|---|---|---|---|---|
| 1 | Hannover 96 (C, P) | 38 | 25 | 4 | 9 | 93 | 39 | +54 | 54 | Promotion to Bundesliga |
| 2 | Bayer 05 Uerdingen (P) | 38 | 20 | 11 | 7 | 66 | 38 | +28 | 51 | Qualification for promotion play-offs |
| 3 | FC St. Pauli | 38 | 22 | 6 | 10 | 77 | 48 | +29 | 50 | |
| 4 | Arminia Bielefeld | 38 | 18 | 14 | 6 | 68 | 47 | +21 | 50 | |
| 5 | Fortuna Köln | 38 | 21 | 4 | 13 | 69 | 43 | +26 | 46 | |
| 6 | Borussia Dortmund | 38 | 17 | 12 | 9 | 65 | 44 | +21 | 46 | |
| 7 | SG Wattenscheid 09 | 38 | 18 | 10 | 10 | 72 | 53 | +19 | 46 | |
| 8 | VfL Osnabrück | 38 | 16 | 10 | 12 | 81 | 62 | +19 | 42 | |
| 9 | Preußen Münster | 38 | 17 | 8 | 13 | 73 | 63 | +10 | 42 | |
| 10 | 1. SC Göttingen 05 | 38 | 15 | 9 | 14 | 60 | 66 | −6 | 39 | |
| 11 | 1. FC Mülheim | 38 | 12 | 12 | 14 | 47 | 64 | −17 | 36 | |
| 12 | Schwarz-Weiss Essen | 38 | 13 | 8 | 17 | 44 | 69 | −25 | 34 | |
| 13 | Wacker 04 Berlin | 38 | 13 | 7 | 18 | 54 | 68 | −14 | 33 | |
| 14 | DJK Gütersloh | 38 | 11 | 10 | 17 | 57 | 63 | −6 | 32 | |
| 15 | Alemannia Aachen | 38 | 11 | 8 | 19 | 57 | 71 | −14 | 30 | |
| 16 | SpVgg Erkenschwick | 38 | 9 | 11 | 18 | 49 | 70 | −21 | 29 | |
| 17 | Olympia Wilhelmshaven (R) | 38 | 10 | 7 | 21 | 54 | 81 | −27 | 27 | Relegation to Oberliga |
| 18 | Rot-Weiß Oberhausen (R) | 38 | 6 | 15 | 17 | 38 | 66 | −28 | 27 | Relegation to Oberliga |
| 19 | VfL Wolfsburg (R) | 38 | 10 | 6 | 22 | 61 | 89 | −28 | 26 | Relegation to Oberliga |
| 20 | HSV Barmbek-Uhlenhorst (R) | 38 | 6 | 8 | 24 | 34 | 86 | −52 | 20 | Relegation to Oberliga |

Source: Bundesliga.de
Rules for classification: 1) points; 2) goal difference; 3) number of goals scored.
(C) Champions; (P) Promoted; (R) Relegated

=== Results ===
| Home \ Away | AAC | BAR | W04 | DSC | BVB | ERK | SWE | G05 | DJK | H96 | FKO | MST | PRM | RWO | OSN | STP | B05 | SGW | WIL | WOB |
|---|---|---|---|---|---|---|---|---|---|---|---|---|---|---|---|---|---|---|---|---|
| Alemannia Aachen | — | 2–1 | 1–3 | 3–1 | 0–1 | 4–0 | 8–1 | 0–2 | 2–1 | 1–3 | 1–1 | 1–1 | 2–1 | 3–1 | 2–2 | 1–2 | 2–2 | 0–0 | 3–0 | 2–1 |
| HSV Barmbek-Uhlenhorst | 2–1 | — | 2–2 | 0–2 | 1–0 | 3–2 | 1–1 | 2–1 | 0–0 | 1–2 | 0–3 | 0–1 | 1–0 | 0–1 | 1–3 | 0–6 | 1–1 | 0–2 | 0–0 | 3–1 |
| Wacker 04 Berlin | 2–0 | 3–1 | — | 5–3 | 3–1 | 0–1 | 1–0 | 1–2 | 1–0 | 1–0 | 4–2 | 2–2 | 1–4 | 1–1 | 2–1 | 1–2 | 0–2 | 3–3 | 3–0 | 4–2 |
| Arminia Bielefeld | 2–0 | 7–1 | 3–0 | — | 1–1 | 2–3 | 2–1 | 4–0 | 3–1 | 1–0 | 3–2 | 1–0 | 3–2 | 1–1 | 1–1 | 1–1 | 0–0 | 1–1 | 1–1 | 1–1 |
| Borussia Dortmund | 6–0 | 2–1 | 2–0 | 1–1 | — | 2–1 | 1–3 | 2–2 | 2–1 | 3–1 | 1–0 | 1–0 | 4–3 | 4–0 | 3–1 | 4–1 | 1–1 | 3–3 | 1–1 | 2–2 |
| SpVgg Erkenschwick | 0–0 | 1–1 | 2–2 | 0–2 | 1–1 | — | 2–1 | 2–0 | 2–2 | 0–1 | 5–2 | 1–2 | 2–3 | 1–1 | 1–0 | 0–1 | 1–3 | 2–2 | 4–1 | 1–2 |
| Schwarz-Weiß Essen | 3–0 | 5–0 | 2–1 | 1–2 | 1–1 | 3–1 | — | 3–1 | 1–0 | 0–0 | 1–0 | 2–1 | 0–1 | 1–1 | 4–1 | 1–1 | 1–2 | 2–0 | 4–0 | 0–0 |
| Göttingen 05 | 5–2 | 2–1 | 1–0 | 2–2 | 0–0 | 1–1 | 1–1 | — | 5–2 | 0–2 | 1–0 | 2–0 | 3–2 | 3–2 | 2–2 | 5–0 | 1–1 | 2–1 | 5–2 | 2–3 |
| DJK Gütersloh | 4–2 | 2–0 | 3–1 | 1–2 | 0–1 | 1–1 | 3–1 | 3–2 | — | 3–2 | 2–0 | 1–1 | 0–1 | 1–1 | 1–1 | 2–2 | 1–1 | 0–1 | 4–0 | 3–1 |
| Hannover 96 | 3–0 | 5–2 | 7–0 | 3–1 | 0–0 | 7–1 | 3–1 | 6–0 | 6–1 | — | 2–0 | 4–1 | 0–1 | 5–2 | 2–0 | 0–1 | 2–0 | 4–1 | 2–0 | 2–1 |
| Fortuna Köln | 5–2 | 4–0 | 2–0 | 0–2 | 2–0 | 2–1 | 2–1 | 2–0 | 4–1 | 1–0 | — | 7–0 | 4–1 | 1–0 | 1–1 | 1–1 | 1–0 | 2–0 | 0–2 | 2–1 |
| 1. FC Mülheim-Styrum | 2–4 | 3–1 | 1–0 | 2–2 | 3–2 | 3–1 | 1–1 | 0–0 | 1–0 | 2–2 | 2–1 | — | 2–3 | 1–1 | 1–0 | 2–0 | 1–1 | 1–1 | 1–0 | 2–1 |
| Preußen Münster | 2–1 | 1–1 | 1–1 | 1–2 | 1–0 | 5–1 | 4–2 | 3–0 | 3–3 | 1–1 | 2–3 | 4–0 | — | 1–0 | 3–3 | 0–4 | 3–0 | 4–1 | 2–1 | 2–2 |
| Rot-Weiß Oberhausen | 2–1 | 1–1 | 2–0 | 2–2 | 0–4 | 1–1 | 1–2 | 1–0 | 0–1 | 0–4 | 1–2 | 0–0 | 2–1 | — | 1–1 | 0–0 | 1–3 | 2–2 | 2–3 | 5–1 |
| VfL Osnabrück | 2–0 | 5–2 | 1–1 | 1–1 | 3–2 | 3–0 | 6–0 | 5–1 | 4–2 | 0–1 | 0–2 | 6–1 | 3–2 | 1–1 | — | 2–1 | 2–0 | 2–1 | 5–2 | 3–0 |
| FC St. Pauli | 1–0 | 3–1 | 1–2 | 3–0 | 1–4 | 2–0 | 5–1 | 4–0 | 1–0 | 0–1 | 3–2 | 3–1 | 1–1 | 4–1 | 2–1 | — | 1–0 | 1–3 | 2–1 | 10–2 |
| Bayer Uerdingen | 1–1 | 3–1 | 3–0 | 0–0 | 2–0 | 2–0 | 3–0 | 1–3 | 2–2 | 6–3 | 1–0 | 2–1 | 3–1 | 0–0 | 5–2 | 2–0 | — | 1–0 | 3–0 | 4–1 |
| SG Wattenscheid | 1–0 | 4–0 | 2–1 | 4–0 | 2–0 | 1–1 | 3–0 | 2–1 | 1–3 | 1–3 | 0–0 | 3–2 | 4–0 | 3–0 | 4–1 | 2–1 | 2–0 | — | 2–2 | 3–2 |
| Olympia Wilhelmshaven | 2–2 | 2–1 | 2–1 | 1–2 | 1–2 | 1–2 | 5–2 | 1–1 | 2–1 | 2–0 | 0–1 | 2–2 | 1–2 | 4–0 | 2–1 | 1–2 | 2–4 | 3–4 | — | 2–1 |
| VfL Wolfsburg | 2–3 | 2–0 | 3–1 | 0–3 | 0–0 | 0–3 | 4–1 | 0–1 | 2–1 | 3–4 | 1–5 | 1–0 | 1–1 | 2–0 | 4–5 | 2–3 | 0–1 | 3–2 | 6–2 | — |

Source: DFB
Legend: Blue = home team win; Yellow = draw; Red = away team win.

=== Top scorers ===
The league's top scorers:

| Goals | Player | Team |
|---|---|---|
| 29 | (Germany) Volker Graul | Arminia Bielefeld |
| 26 | (Germany) Gerd-Volker Schock | VfL Osnabrück |
| 24 | (Germany) Rüdiger Wenzel | FC St. Pauli |
| 23 | (Denmark) Peter Dahl | Hannover 96 |
| 20 | (Germany) Gerd Kasperski | Hannover 96 |
| 20 | (Germany) Rolf Kucharski | Alemannia Aachen |
| 19 | (Germany) Wolfgang John | Wacker 04 Berlin |
| 19 | (Germany) Wolf-Rüdiger Krause | VfL Wolfsburg |
| 19 | (Germany) Roland Stegmayer | Hannover 96 |
| 18 | (Germany) Hans Fritsche | Schwarz-Weiß Essen |

== Süd ==
=== League table ===
For the 1974–75 season saw no team promoted to the new 2. Bundesliga from the Amateurligas and no team relegated to the 2. Bundesliga Süd from the Bundesliga.

| Pos | Team | Pld | W | D | L | GF | GA | GD | Pts | Promotion, qualification or relegation |
|---|---|---|---|---|---|---|---|---|---|---|
| 1 | Karlsruher SC (C, P) | 38 | 22 | 6 | 10 | 76 | 50 | +26 | 50 | Promotion to Bundesliga |
| 2 | FK Pirmasens | 38 | 19 | 10 | 9 | 75 | 62 | +13 | 48 | Qualification for promotion play-offs |
| 3 | FC Schweinfurt 05 | 38 | 19 | 10 | 9 | 65 | 59 | +6 | 48 | |
| 4 | Bayern Hof | 38 | 18 | 10 | 10 | 65 | 46 | +19 | 46 | |
| 5 | 1860 Munich | 38 | 20 | 5 | 13 | 64 | 45 | +19 | 45 | |
| 6 | 1. FC Nürnberg | 38 | 17 | 8 | 13 | 70 | 52 | +18 | 42 | |
| 7 | 1. FC Saarbrücken | 38 | 15 | 11 | 12 | 72 | 52 | +20 | 41 | |
| 8 | Waldhof Mannheim | 38 | 16 | 8 | 14 | 52 | 42 | +10 | 40 | |
| 9 | SpVgg Bayreuth | 38 | 15 | 10 | 13 | 53 | 50 | +3 | 40 | |
| 10 | Darmstadt 98 | 38 | 16 | 7 | 15 | 68 | 62 | +6 | 39 | |
| 11 | Mainz 05 | 38 | 14 | 10 | 14 | 63 | 60 | +3 | 38 | |
| 12 | FC Augsburg | 38 | 12 | 13 | 13 | 61 | 63 | −2 | 37 | |
| 13 | Röchling Völklingen | 38 | 11 | 12 | 15 | 56 | 54 | +2 | 34 | |
| 14 | FC Homburg | 38 | 13 | 8 | 17 | 71 | 74 | −3 | 34 | |
| 15 | SpVgg Fürth | 38 | 12 | 10 | 16 | 40 | 48 | −8 | 34 | |
| 16 | Stuttgarter Kickers | 38 | 13 | 7 | 18 | 52 | 61 | −9 | 33 | |
| 17 | VfR Heilbronn (R) | 38 | 10 | 10 | 18 | 51 | 78 | −27 | 30 | Relegation to Oberliga |
| 18 | Borussia Neunkirchen (R) | 38 | 11 | 6 | 21 | 49 | 73 | −24 | 28 | Relegation to Oberliga |
| 19 | Wormatia Worms (R) | 38 | 9 | 9 | 20 | 36 | 66 | −30 | 27 | Relegation to Oberliga |
| 20 | VfR Mannheim (R) | 38 | 8 | 10 | 20 | 43 | 85 | −42 | 26 | Relegation to Oberliga |

Source: Bundesliga.de
Rules for classification: 1) points; 2) goal difference; 3) number of goals scored.
(C) Champions; (P) Promoted; (R) Relegated

=== Results ===
| Home \ Away | FCA | BAY | D98 | FUE | HEI | HOF | HOM | KSC | M05 | MAN | M60 | BNE | FCN | FKP | FCS | S05 | SKI | SVR | CWA | W08 |
|---|---|---|---|---|---|---|---|---|---|---|---|---|---|---|---|---|---|---|---|---|
| FC Augsburg | — | 3–0 | 2–1 | 2–0 | 5–0 | 1–2 | 1–0 | 1–1 | 0–0 | 1–1 | 2–3 | 3–1 | 2–0 | 3–3 | 2–1 | 0–2 | 3–1 | 1–0 | 2–1 | 3–3 |
| SpVgg Bayreuth | 2–1 | — | 0–0 | 2–0 | 2–0 | 1–0 | 3–0 | 1–1 | 4–1 | 2–0 | 2–1 | 2–0 | 3–1 | 4–1 | 2–2 | 1–4 | 0–0 | 1–2 | 2–1 | 0–0 |
| Darmstadt 98 | 2–0 | 4–1 | — | 1–3 | 4–1 | 1–1 | 4–1 | 3–2 | 1–2 | 3–0 | 1–2 | 3–0 | 1–0 | 2–2 | 3–2 | 3–1 | 2–0 | 3–2 | 5–1 | 1–1 |
| SpVgg Fürth | 3–0 | 1–1 | 1–3 | — | 1–3 | 0–0 | 2–0 | 4–2 | 1–0 | 0–0 | 0–1 | 0–2 | 3–2 | 1–1 | 3–2 | 0–1 | 2–2 | 1–1 | 2–0 | 1–0 |
| VfR Heilbronn | 3–3 | 1–3 | 1–1 | 0–1 | — | 1–2 | 1–1 | 1–0 | 2–2 | 0–0 | 1–1 | 3–0 | 0–3 | 2–2 | 4–4 | 5–1 | 4–2 | 1–0 | 0–0 | 1–0 |
| Bayern Hof | 1–3 | 0–0 | 1–2 | 1–1 | 0–1 | — | 3–2 | 3–0 | 3–3 | 2–0 | 4–2 | 3–1 | 3–0 | 3–1 | 1–1 | 2–0 | 2–0 | 2–1 | 1–0 | 4–0 |
| FC Homburg | 1–1 | 1–0 | 3–2 | 2–2 | 4–0 | 0–2 | — | 2–3 | 3–2 | 6–1 | 2–0 | 3–1 | 2–1 | 0–0 | 3–3 | 4–0 | 2–1 | 2–2 | 1–1 | 4–0 |
| Karlsruher SC | 2–0 | 5–1 | 2–2 | 1–0 | 5–1 | 2–0 | 4–2 | — | 3–1 | 5–0 | 1–0 | 2–0 | 1–1 | 5–0 | 2–1 | 6–0 | 2–1 | 0–4 | 1–0 | 2–0 |
| Mainz 05 | 3–2 | 3–0 | 1–0 | 2–3 | 4–1 | 2–0 | 2–5 | 0–1 | — | 1–1 | 1–3 | 3–0 | 2–0 | 1–2 | 1–2 | 1–2 | 1–0 | 1–0 | 1–1 | 3–2 |
| VfR Mannheim | 1–1 | 1–5 | 1–0 | 2–2 | 1–3 | 2–2 | 4–2 | 1–4 | 2–5 | — | 2–1 | 1–3 | 3–1 | 2–0 | 0–5 | 1–1 | 2–4 | 2–0 | 1–2 | 4–0 |
| 1860 Munich | 1–1 | 2–0 | 4–0 | 1–0 | 1–0 | 0–0 | 4–1 | 1–1 | 1–3 | 3–0 | — | 4–1 | 3–2 | 3–2 | 1–0 | 1–3 | 4–1 | 1–0 | 3–0 | 3–0 |
| Borussia Neunkirchen | 2–2 | 1–0 | 3–2 | 0–1 | 2–1 | 2–4 | 2–0 | 4–2 | 1–1 | 0–0 | 1–2 | — | 1–2 | 3–0 | 0–3 | 0–0 | 2–1 | 1–2 | 2–2 | 1–0 |
| 1. FC Nürnberg | 2–2 | 1–1 | 3–2 | 2–0 | 2–1 | 6–2 | 6–5 | 2–0 | 3–0 | 5–0 | 1–0 | 1–4 | — | 1–1 | 2–1 | 4–0 | 2–1 | 1–1 | 2–0 | 3–0 |
| FK Pirmasens | 2–1 | 2–1 | 5–1 | 2–1 | 8–0 | 3–2 | 4–2 | 2–1 | 2–1 | 1–1 | 3–3 | 5–3 | 0–0 | — | 3–2 | 4–1 | 3–0 | 0–0 | 2–1 | 3–0 |
| 1. FC Saarbrücken | 2–2 | 4–1 | 1–0 | 2–0 | 4–1 | 2–1 | 2–3 | 0–1 | 2–2 | 0–3 | 1–0 | 1–0 | 2–1 | 6–0 | — | 0–0 | 1–1 | 2–0 | 2–0 | 0–1 |
| 1. FC Schweinfurt | 4–2 | 1–1 | 4–1 | 0–0 | 2–2 | 2–3 | 2–0 | 3–0 | 0–0 | 4–1 | 2–1 | 4–1 | 1–0 | 3–1 | 1–1 | — | 3–2 | 4–3 | 2–0 | 0–0 |
| Stuttgarter Kickers | 2–0 | 2–0 | 3–1 | 2–0 | 3–1 | 1–4 | 2–1 | 1–1 | 2–2 | 1–0 | 1–0 | 2–1 | 2–2 | 0–2 | 2–0 | 0–1 | — | 1–0 | 1–1 | 4–1 |
| Röchling Völklingen | 4–2 | 1–1 | 2–2 | 1–0 | 0–2 | 1–1 | 0–0 | 5–0 | 1–1 | 5–1 | 3–1 | 3–0 | 1–1 | 2–0 | 2–5 | 3–4 | 2–1 | — | 0–0 | 1–1 |
| SV Chio Waldhof | 5–0 | 2–1 | 3–0 | 2–0 | 1–0 | 1–0 | 4–0 | 1–3 | 2–1 | 2–0 | 1–2 | 2–2 | 1–0 | 0–1 | 1–1 | 4–1 | 3–0 | 4–0 | — | 1–0 |
| Wormatia Worms | 1–1 | 0–2 | 0–1 | 2–0 | 3–2 | 0–0 | 2–1 | 1–2 | 2–3 | 3–1 | 1–0 | 3–1 | 0–4 | 0–2 | 2–2 | 1–1 | 3–2 | 3–1 | 0–1 | — |

Source: DFB
Legend: Blue = home team win; Yellow = draw; Red = away team win.

=== Top scorers ===
The league's top scorers:

| Goals | Player | Team |
|---|---|---|
| 25 | (Germany) Bernd Hoffmann | Karlsruher SC |
| 23 | (Germany) Ferdinand Keller | TSV 1860 Munich |
| 21 | (Germany) Otmar Ludwig | FC 08 Homburg |
| 21 | (Germany) Hans Walitza | 1. FC Nürnberg |
| 17 | (Luxembourg) Gilbert Dussier | Röchling Völklingen |
| 16 | (Germany) Lothar Emmerich | FC Schweinfurt 05 |
| 16 | (Germany) Werner Seubert | FC Schweinfurt 05 |
| 15 | (Germany) Harald Aumeier | FC Schweinfurt 05 |
| 15 | (Germany) Harry Erhart | FK Pirmasens |
| 15 | (Germany) Gerhard Pankotsch | FC 08 Homburg |
| 15 | (Germany) Gerd Warken | Röchling Völklingen |
| 15 | (Germany) Dieter Weinkauff | FK Pirmasens |
| 15 | (Germany) Hartmut Werner | FC Bayern Hof |

== Promotion play-offs ==
The second placed teams of each division entered a two-leg promotion play-off. Bayer Uerdingen was promoted to Bundesliga.

| Team 1 | Agg. | Team 2 | 1st leg | 2nd leg |
|---|---|---|---|---|
| FK Pirmasens (S) | 4–10 | Bayer Uerdingen (N) | 4–4 | 0–6 |
