= Gerhard Welz =

German footballer (1945–2024)

Personal information
- Date of birth: 1 February 1945
- Place of birth: Frankfurt, Gau Hesse-Nassau, Nazi Germany
- Date of death: 6 April 2024 (aged 79)
- Place of death: Bad Wildungen, Hesse, Germany
- Position: Goalkeeper

Youth career
- –1965: VfL Germania 1894

Senior career*
Years	Team	Apps	(Gls)
1965–1966	Viktoria Aschaffenburg		
1966–1967	Bayern Munich	0	(0)
1967–1969	1. FC Saarbrücken	45	(0)
1969–1971	1. FC Nürnberg	74	(0)
1971–1975	1. FC Köln	89	(0)
1975–1977	Preußen Münster	36	(0)
1977–1979	Tennis Borussia Berlin	72	(0)
1979–1980	VfB Stuttgart	1	(0)
1980–1982	Fortuna Köln	29	(0)
1982–1983	Rot-Weiß Oberhausen	25	(0)
Total		371	(0)

International career
1972	West Germany B	1	(0)
1973	West Germany U23	2	(0)
- * Club domestic league appearances and goals

Gerhard Welz (1 February 1945 – 6 April 2024) was a German professional footballer who played as a goalkeeper. He made a total of 90 appearances in the Bundesliga and 137 in the 2. Bundesliga during his playing career. Welz died in Bad Wildungen, Hesse on 6 April 2024, at the age of 79.
