= Klaus Basikow =

German footballer and manager

Personal information
- Full name: Klaus Basikow
- Date of birth: 12 June 1937
- Place of birth: Berlin, German Reich
- Date of death: 5 March 2015 (aged 77)
- Position: Goalkeeper

Youth career
- 1947–1957: BFC Südring

Senior career*
| Years | Team | Apps | (Gls) |
| 1957–1959 | BFC Südring | 50 | (0) |
| 1959–1966 | SC Tasmania 1900 Berlin | 108 | (0) |
| Total | | 158 | (0) |

Managerial career
- 1970–1974: SC Wacker 04 Berlin
- 1974–1976: SV Meppen
- 1976–1978: SC Wacker 04 Berlin
- 1978: Tennis Borussia Berlin
- 1978–1979: SC Wacker 04 Berlin
- 1979–1986: SC Wacker 04 Berlin
- 1986–1988: 1. Traber FC Mariendorf
- * Club domestic league appearances and goals

Klaus Basikow (12 June 1937 – 5 March 2015) was a German football player and manager.

Born in Berlin, Basikow made a total of 14 appearances in the Bundesliga for SC Tasmania 1900 Berlin during his playing career and later managed SC Wacker 04 Berlin and Tennis Borussia Berlin in the 2. Bundesliga North.
