= Rudi Faßnacht =

German footballer and manager

Personal information
- Full name: Rudolf Faßnacht
- Date of birth: 28 December 1934
- Place of birth: Neu-Ulm, German Reich
- Date of death: 25 July 2000 (aged 65)
- Place of death: Gonesse, France
- Position: Defender

Senior career*
Years	Team	Apps	(Gls)
- VfB Stuttgart
- TSG Ulm 1846
- Hannover 96
- Bayer 04 Leverkusen

Managerial career
- 1966–1968: Holstein Kiel
- 1969–1970: FC 08 Villingen
- 1970–1973: MSV Duisburg
- 1974: Arminia Bielefeld
- 1974–1975: VfR Heilbronn
- 1975–1977: SC Preußen Münster
- 1977: Tennis Borussia Berlin
- 1978–1979: SC Fortuna Köln
- 1981: SC Preußen Münster
- * Club domestic league appearances and goals

Rudolf "Rudi" Faßnacht (28 December 1934 – 25 July 2000) was a German football manager.

== Career ==
Faßnacht coached MSV Duisburg to a 7th-place finish in the 1970–71 Bundesliga season.

== Death ==
On 25 July 2000 Faßnacht and his wife were among the passengers on Air France Flight 4590 with 109 people on board, a Concorde which crashed into the Hôtelissimo Les Relais Bleus Hotel in Gonesse with no survivors. 4 people on the ground were also killed.
