= Emanuel Günther =

German association football player

Personal information
- Date of birth: 13 November 1954 (age 71)
- Place of birth: Worms, Germany
- Height: 1.77 m (5 ft 10 in)
- Position: Striker

Youth career
- –1973: Wormatia Worms

Senior career*
Years	Team	Apps	(Gls)
1973–1977	Wormatia Worms	88	(63)
1977–1978	Karlsruher SC	38	(27)
1979–1979	Fortuna Düsseldorf	13	(4)
1979–1987	Karlsruher SC	274	(108)
1987–1992	1. FC Pforzheim	148	(9)
- * Club domestic league appearances and goals

Emanuel Günther (born 13 November 1954) is a German former professional footballer who played as a striker. He made 41 goals in 139 matches in the Bundesliga and 98 goals in 189 appearances in the 2. Bundesliga.
