= Winfried Stradt =

German footballer

Personal information
- Full name: Winfried Stradt
- Date of birth: 25 September 1956 (age 70)
- Place of birth: Paderborn, West Germany
- Position: Striker

Youth career
- –1974: 1. FC Paderborn
- 1974–1975: Eintracht Frankfurt

Senior career*
Years	Team	Apps	(Gls)
1975–1976	Eintracht Frankfurt	7	(0)
1976–1978	Tennis Borussia Berlin	56	(21)
1978–1981	Alemannia Aachen	86	(38)
Total		149	(59)
- * Club domestic league appearances and goals

Winfried Stradt (born 25 September 1956 in Paderborn) is a former professional German footballer.

Stradt made a total of 28 appearances in the Fußball-Bundesliga and 121 in the 2. Bundesliga during his playing career.
