= Heinz-Josef Kehr =

German footballer

Personal information
- Full name: Heinz-Josef Kehr
- Date of birth: 18 December 1950
- Place of birth: Brühl, West Germany
- Date of death: 19 November 2014 (aged 63)
- Position: Striker

Youth career
- SC Brühl 06/45
- SpVgg Frechen

Senior career*
Years	Team	Apps	(Gls)
–1976	SC Brühl 06/45		
1976–1977	Alemannia Aachen	37	(23)
1977–1978	Tennis Borussia Berlin	32	(18)
1978–1981	Alemannia Aachen	97	(31)
1981–1982	Rot-Weiss Essen	21	(6)
Total		187	(78)
- * Club domestic league appearances and goals

Heinz-Josef Kehr (18 December 1950, Brühl, North Rhine-Westphalia – 19 November 2014) was a professional German footballer.

Kehr made 187 appearances and scored 78 goals in the 2. Fußball-Bundesliga for Alemannia Aachen, Tennis Borussia Berlin and Rot-Weiss Essen during his playing career.
