= SC Brühl (Germany) =

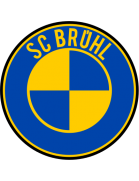
- Full name: Sportclub Brühl e.V.
- Founded: October 15, 1901; 124 years ago
- Ground: Schlossparkstadion
- Capacity: 3,500
- Website: https://www.scb0645.de/
Home colours	Away colours

SC Brühl, officially known as Sportclub Brühl e.V., is a German football club based in Brühl. The club was founded on October 15, 1901, and has a long-standing history in German football.

== History ==
SC Brühl was established in 1901 and began participating in local leagues. Additionally, the club has experienced promotions to higher divisions within the German football league system, showcasing their ability to compete at higher levels. Alongside these accomplishments, the club has also achieved success at the local and regional levels, winning championships or tournaments within their respective leagues or divisions. The team was founded when SV Bruhl 06 and Bruhler SC merged.

== Stadium ==
The home matches of SC Brühl are played at their own stadium, known as "Schlossparkstadion". The stadium provides a dedicated venue for the club and its passionate supporters. The Schlossparkstadion has a seating capacity of 3,500.

The stadium features modern facilities and amenities for fans attending matches. It underwent significant renovations in 2010, including the installation of new seating, improved lighting, and upgraded dressing rooms. The pitch is well-maintained, meeting the highest standards for professional football matches.

== Players ==
Note: Flags indicate national team as defined under FIFA eligibility rules; some limited exceptions apply. Players may hold more than one non-FIFA nationality.

No.	Pos.	Nation	Player
—	GK	GHA	James Babik
—	DF	ERI	Awet Mekonen Mesfn
11	DF	TOG	Wiyao Theodore Beleyi
14	DF	GER	Nils Bertram
22	DF	GER	Cornelius Tietze
30	DF	KOS	Albin Kallaba
—	DF	GER	Marvin Oluwa
—	DF	GER	Pascal Japes
—	DF	TUR	Tolgahan Aydin
—	DF	GRE	Christos Stafidis
—	DF	NGR	Ebubechukwe Ukeje
—	MF	GER	Oscar von Lehmann
—	MF	GER	Guillaume Nteka Vunda
—	MF	GER	Timo Höth
2	MF	GER	Sven Steimels
5	MF	GER	August von Lehmann
26	MF	GER	Kai Odermatt
—	MF	GER	Johannes Jahn
3	MF	GER	Halil Kücükhasanoglu
6	MF	GER	Asilkan Kenar
—	FW	GER	Ganesh Pundt
—	FW	GER	Zakariya Bouniss
15	FW	GER	Maximilian Frank
24	FW	GER	Max Breuer

== Club rivalries ==
SC Brühl has developed local rivalries with neighboring clubs, and had a long-standing rivalry with Blau-Weiß Brühl, before the latter was dissolved.

== See also ==
- Football in Germany
- List of football clubs in Germany
