= Klaus Heinlein =

German footballer

Personal information
- Date of birth: 23 December 1953 (age 72)
- Place of birth: Fürth, West Germany
- Position: Midfielder

Senior career*
Years	Team	Apps	(Gls)
1974–1980	Greuther Fürth	190	(54)
1980–1981	Edmonton Drillers	44	(10)
Total		234	(64)
- * Club domestic league appearances and goals

Klaus Heinlein (born 23 December 1953) is a German former professional footballer who played as a midfielder in Germany for SpVgg Greuther Fürth and in the North American Soccer League for the Edmonton Drillers.
