= Gerd-Volker Schock =

German footballer (born 1950)

Personal information
- Date of birth: 8 April 1950 (age 76)
- Place of birth: Bad Schwartau, West Germany
- Position: Striker

Senior career*
Years	Team	Apps	(Gls)
1969–	VfB Lübeck		
1971–1972	SC Sperber Hamburg		
1972–1974	1. FC Phönix Lübeck		
1974–1979	VfL Osnabrück	174	(83)
1979–1983	Arminia Bielefeld	84	(44)
1983–1984	VfL Osnabrück	31	(3)

Managerial career
- 1990–1992: Hamburger SV
- 1992–1993: Hamburger SV (youth team)
- 1993–1995: TuS Hoisdorf
- 1995: Hamburger SV II
- 1998–1999: VfL Osnabrück
- 2001–2002: Holstein Kiel
- 2003: Holstein Kiel
- * Club domestic league appearances and goals as of 13:31, 4 January 2009 (UTC)

Gerd-Volker Schock (born 8 April 1950) is a German football coach and a former player.

He played 57 matches in the Bundesliga and scored 23 goals. Only seven players scored more goals in the history of the 2. Bundesliga.
