= Christian Sackewitz =

German footballer

Personal information
- Full name: Christian Sackewitz
- Date of birth: 11 December 1955 (age 70)
- Place of birth: Göttingen, West Germany
- Height: 1.80 m (5 ft 11 in)
- Position: Striker

Youth career
- SFC Stern 1900
- –1975: Hertha Zehlendorf

Senior career*
Years	Team	Apps	(Gls)
1975–1976	Tennis Borussia Berlin	25	(0)
1976–1981	Arminia Bielefeld	150	(61)
1981–1982	Bayer 04 Leverkusen	20	(2)
1982–1984	FC Bayer 05 Uerdingen	53	(7)
1984–1985	Eintracht Braunschweig	13	(0)
1986–1987	Hertha BSC	25	(26)
Total		286	(96)

Managerial career
- 2002: Hertha Zehlendorf
- * Club domestic league appearances and goals

Christian Sackewitz (born 11 December 1955 in Göttingen) is a former professional German footballer.

Sackewitz made 134 Fußball-Bundesliga appearances during his footballing career, and was the 1979–80 2. Fußball-Bundesliga top scorer, with 35 goals in 36 games.
