= Ewald Hammes =

German footballer (born 1950)

Personal information
- Date of birth: 4 August 1950 (age 76)
- Place of birth: Koblenz, West Germany
- Height: 1.80 m (5 ft 11 in)
- Position: Forward

Senior career*
Years	Team	Apps	(Gls)
- SG Wattenscheid 09

International career
- West Germany
- * Club domestic league appearances and goals

Ewald Hammes (born 4 August 1950) is a German footballer who played as a forward for SG Wattenscheid 09. He competed for West Germany in the men's tournament at the 1972 Summer Olympics.
