= List of FC Hansa Rostock players =

Below is a list of players who have played 50 or more league games for FC Hansa Rostock. For all FC Hansa Rostock players with an article, see Category:FC Hansa Rostock players.

== Players ==
As of 1 July 2009

| Player | Nat. | First appearance | Last appearance | League | Goals | Cup | Goals | Continental | Goals | Total | Goals |
|---|---|---|---|---|---|---|---|---|---|---|---|
| Adam, Ronald | Germany | 20 November 1976 | 16 April 1983 | 55 | 3 | 4 | 0 | 0 | 0 | 59 | 3 |
| Agali, Victor | Nigeria | 18 July 1998 | 10 May 2008 | 89 | 18 | 5 | 1 | 2 | 1 | 96 | 20 |
| Alms, Gernot | Germany | 15 November 1980 | 6 March 1994 | 298 | 12 | 35 | 1 | 4 | 0 | 338 | 13 |
| Arnholdt, Bernd | Germany | 6 December 1981 | 5 April 1991 | 93 | 1 | 20 | 0 | 0 | 0 | 113 | 1 |
| Arvidsson, Magnus | Sweden | 7 August 1999 | 14 May 2006 | 181 | 32 | 16 | 10 | 0 | 0 | 198 | 32 |
| Babendererde, Andreas | Germany | 24 November 1979 | 4 September 1991 | 139 | 16 | 22 | 5 | 2 | 0 | 163 | 21 |
| Barbarez, Sergej | Bosnia and Herzegovina | 10 August 1996 | 9 May 1998 | 59 | 13 | 3 | 1 | 0 | 0 | 62 | 14 |
| Barthels, Wolfgang | Germany | 14 June 1959 | 3 December 1969 | 221 | 45 | 25 | 4 | 6 | 1 | 252 | 50 |
| Baumgart, Steffen | Germany | 14 August 1994 | 4 May 2002 | 185 | 32 | 9 | 3 | 0 | 0 | 194 | 35 |
| Beinlich, Stefan | Germany | 14 August 1994 | 8 March 2008 | 138 | 35 | 4 | 3 | 0 | 0 | 142 | 38 |
| Benken, Sven | Germany | 12 October 1999 | 8 December 2001 | 56 | 2 | 4 | 0 | 0 | 0 | 60 | 2 |
| Bialas, Arthur | Germany | 14 November 1954 | 10 June 1962 | 167 | 93 | 23 | 18 | 0 | 0 | 190 | 111 |
| Bloch, Uwe | Germany | 24 August 1975 | 25 October 1980 | 71 | 12 | 13 | 0 | 0 | 0 | 94 | 12 |
| Bodden, Olaf | Germany | 3 August 1991 | 1 October 1994 | 83 | 24 | 4 | 0 | 1 | 0 | 88 | 24 |
| Bräutigam, Perry | Germany | 12 August 1995 | 16 March 2002 | 104 | 0 | 7 | 0 | 0 | 0 | 111 | 0 |
| Breitkreutz, Matthias | Germany | 14 August 1994 | 4 February 2001 | 102 | 8 | 7 | 2 | 0 | 0 | 109 | 10 |
| Brümmer, Gerhard | Germany | 1 June 1968 | 20 May 1972 | 50 | 0 | 7 | 0 | 7 | 0 | 64 | 0 |
| Bullerjahn, Mayk | Germany | 10 September 1982 | 12 December 1987 | 52 | 1 | 10 | 4 | 0 | 0 | 62 | 5 |
| Bülow, Kai | Germany | 12 September 2005 | 24 May 2009 | 104 | 5 | 6 | 0 | 0 | 0 | 110 | 5 |
| Ćetković, Đorđije | Montenegro | 22 January 2006 | 30 November 2008 | 67 | 12 | 4 | 1 | 0 | 0 | 71 | 13 |
| Chałaśkiewicz, Sławomir | Poland | 12 July 1992 | 12 September 1997 | 135 | 17 | 9 | 1 | 0 | 0 | 144 | 18 |
| Decker, Jürgen | Germany | 22 April 1964 | 25 November 1978 | 211 | 31 | 24 | 4 | 5 | 2 | 240 | 37 |
| Di Salvo, Antonio | Italy | 4 August 2001 | 23 April 2006 | 112 | 20 | 7 | 5 | 0 | 0 | 120 | 25 |
| Dowe, Jens | Germany | 6 May 1987 | 22 May 1999 | 197 | 30 | 17 | 5 | 4 | 0 | 219 | 35 |
| Drews, Werner | Germany | 8 March 1959 | 4 April 1970 | 268 | 58 | 34 | 4 | 6 | 4 | 308 | 66 |
| Ehlers, Uwe | Germany | 2 April 1994 | 24 March 2000 | 116 | 5 | 5 | 0 | 0 | 0 | 121 | 5 |
| Emara, Mohamed | Egypt | 19 February 1999 | 4 May 2002 | 76 | 0 | 3 | 0 | 0 | 0 | 79 | 0 |
| Fuchs, Henri | Germany | 10 September 1988 | 8 April 2001 | 83 | 19 | 10 | 4 | 4 | 0 | 97 | 23 |
| Gansauge, Thomas | Germany | 5 September 1990 | 12 October 1999 | 72 | 0 | 5 | 0 | 2 | 0 | 79 | 0 |
| Gledson | Brasilianer | 20 August 2005 | 8 May 2009 | 76 | 7 | 6 | 0 | 0 | 0 | 82 | 7 |
| Groth, Martin | Germany | 12 August 1995 | 9 May 1998 | 59 | 1 | 2 | 0 | 0 | 0 | 61 | 1 |
| Habermann, Kurt | Germany | 18 August 1963 | 23 August 1969 | 100 | 12 | 9 | 3 | 4 | 0 | 113 | 15 |
| Hahn, Lothar | Germany | 23 August 1969 | 21 May 1977 | 135 | 23 | 20 | 6 | 4 | 0 | 159 | 29 |
| Hauschild, Axel | Germany | 1 November 1980 | 15 March 1988 | 73 | 0 | 12 | 0 | 0 | 0 | 85 | 0 |
| Heinsch, Jürgen | Germany | 5 August 1958 | 29 May 1971 | 176 | 0 | 25 | 0 | 2 | 0 | 203 | 0 |
| Hergesell, Helmut | Germany | 11 August 1963 | 16 December 1972 | 200 | 17 | 22 | 2 | 8 | 2 | 230 | 21 |
| Hill, Delano | Netherlands Surinamese | 12 August 2001 | 21 May 2005 | 96 | 3 | 8 | 0 | 0 | 0 | 105 | 3 |
| Hoffmann, Daniel | Germany | 22 September 1990 | 18 June 1995 | 143 | 0 | 6 | 0 | 2 | 0 | 151 | 0 |
| Hofschneider, André | Germany | 14 August 1994 | 31 May 1997 | 58 | 0 | 3 | 0 | 0 | 0 | 61 | 0 |
| Holtfreter, Herbert | Germany | 21 November 1954 | 2 February 1964 | 110 | 30 | 15 | 12 | 0 | 0 | 125 | 42 |
| Jakobsson, Andreas | Sweden | 11 August 2000 | 24 May 2003 | 99 | 4 | 5 | 0 | 0 | 0 | 104 | 4 |
| Jarohs, Rainer | Germany | 10 September 1975 | 26 May 1990 | 362 | 166 | 40 | 19 | 1 | 0 | 403 | 185 |
| Kaschke, Rüdiger | Germany | 4 March 1978 | 17 December 1983 | 105 | 20 | 10 | 3 | 0 | 0 | 115 | 23 |
| Kaube, Rainer | Germany | 1 November 1964 | 8 March 1975 | 57 | 2 | 12 | 0 | 0 | 0 | 69 | 2 |
| Kehl, Dietrich | Germany | 16 June 1971 | 14 June 1980 | 143 | 21 | 21 | 6 | 0 | 0 | 164 | 27 |
| Kern, Enrico | Germany | 22 January 2006 | 17 May 2010 | 110 | 38 | 7 | 7 | 0 | 0 | 117 | 45 |
| Kische, Gerd | Germany | 22 August 1970 | 30 May 1981 | 248 | 23 | 32 | 3 | 0 | 0 | 280 | 26 |
| Kleiminger, Heino | Germany | 23 September 1956 | 20 September 1969 | 191 | 62 | 27 | 9 | 1 | 0 | 219 | 71 |
| Kostmann, Gerd | Germany | 9 August 1964 | 12 June 1971 | 89 | 43 | 13 | 4 | 4 | 2 | 106 | 49 |
| Kruse, Axel | Germany | 19 October 1985 | 3 June 1989 | 79 | 14 | 10 | 1 | 0 | 0 | 89 | 15 |
| Kunath, Jens | Germany | 2 November 1985 | 18 June 1995 | 124 | 0 | 19 | 0 | 2 | 0 | 146 | 0 |
| Lange, Timo | Germany | 12 July 1992 | 9 March 2005 | 275 | 31 | 13 | 3 | 2 | 0 | 290 | 34 |
| Langen, Dexter | Germany | 13 August 2006 | 17 April 2009 | 66 | 0 | 3 | 1 | 0 | 0 | 69 | 1 |
| Lantz, Marcus | Sweden | 30 November 1999 | 14 May 2005 | 164 | 6 | 12 | 2 | 0 | 0 | 176 | 8 |
| Leeb, Rolf | Germany | 14 November 1954 | 5 May 1963 | 151 | 16 | 22 | 5 | 0 | 0 | 173 | 21 |
| Lembke, Horst | Germany | 31 March 1957 | 8 May 1960 | 55 | 9 | 8 | 3 | 0 | 0 | 63 | 12 |
| Lenz, Dieter | Germany | 14 March 1970 | 24 May 1975 | 132 | 17 | 20 | 3 | 0 | 0 | 152 | 20 |
| Littmann, Norbert | Germany | 26 August 1978 | 27 August 1988 | 221 | 9 | 31 | 2 | 0 | 0 | 252 | 11 |
| Madeja, Günter | Germany | 5 March 1961 | 1 June 1968 | 68 | 13 | 10 | 2 | 0 | 0 | 78 | 15 |
| Madsen, Kim | Danmark | 7 February 2004 | 13 May 2007 | 58 | 1 | 5 | 0 | 0 | 0 | 63 | 1 |
| Majak, Sławomir | Poland | 2 August 1997 | 19 May 2001 | 108 | 15 | 7 | 2 | 2 | 0 | 117 | 17 |
| März, Heiko | Germany | 17 December 1983 | 4 October 1997 | 344 | 27 | 29 | 6 | 3 | 0 | 377 | 33 |
| Märzke, Eckhard | Germany | 18 December 1971 | 11 October 1980 | 139 | 8 | 18 | 0 | 3 | 0 | 157 | 8 |
| Maul, Ronald | Germany | 4 August 2001 | 13 February 2006 | 113 | 0 | 7 | 0 | 0 | 0 | 120 | 0 |
| Minuth, Heinz | Germany | 21 November 1954 | 7 October 1962 | 189 | 3 | 23 | 3 | 0 | 0 | 212 | 6 |
| Mischinger, Michael | Germany | 1 December 1973 | 20 September 1986 | 258 | 27 | 34 | 4 | 0 | 0 | 292 | 31 |
| Möhrle, Uwe | Germany | 30 November 2002 | 21 May 2005 | 60 | 2 | 4 | 0 | 0 | 0 | 65 | 2 |
| Neuville, Oliver | Germany | 27 September 1997 | 29 May 1999 | 50 | 22 | 2 | 0 | 2 | 0 | 54 | 22 |
| Orestes | Brasilianer | 4 August 2007 | 24 May 2009 | 58 | 6 | 4 | 1 | 0 | 0 | 62 | 7 |
| Oswald, Kai | Germany | 15 August 1999 | 16 March 2002 | 66 | 3 | 2 | 0 | 0 | 0 | 68 | 3 |
| Pankau, Herbert | Germany | 22 May 1960 | 16 June 1971 | 257 | 30 | 30 | 4 | 8 | 1 | 295 | 35 |
| Persigehl, Stefan | Germany | 30 July 1991 | 14 November 1994 | 106 | 10 | 5 | 2 | 2 | 0 | 114 | 12 |
| Persson, Joakim | Sweden | 14 August 2002 | 14 May 2005 | 84 | 1 | 7 | 0 | 0 | 0 | 92 | 1 |
| Pieckenhagen, Martin | Germany | 15 February 1997 | 19 May 2001 | 110 | 0 | 6 | 0 | 2 | 0 | 118 | 0 |
| Pöschel, Karl | Germany | 14 November 1954 | 26 March 1961 | 116 | 4 | 19 | 1 | 0 | 0 | 135 | 5 |
| Prica, Rade | Sweden | 14 August 2002 | 14 May 2006 | 113 | 20 | 9 | 2 | 0 | 0 | 123 | 22 |
| Radtke, Christian | Germany | 2 May 1970 | 1 June 1985 | 220 | 30 | 28 | 2 | 0 | 0 | 248 | 32 |
| Rahn, Christian | Germany | 13 August 2006 | 8 December 2008 | 66 | 9 | 3 | 0 | 0 | 0 | 69 | 9 |
| Rahn, Wolfgang | Germany | 16 June 1971 | 11 April 1976 | 110 | 20 | 12 | 6 | 0 | 0 | 122 | 15 |
| Rasmussen, Thomas | Danmark | 3 August 2003 | 12 August 2005 | 62 | 7 | 6 | 0 | 0 | 0 | 69 | 7 |
| Rathgeb, Tobias | Germany | 22 January 2006 | 5 October 2008 | 59 | 2 | 5 | 0 | 0 | 0 | 64 | 2 |
| Rehmer, Marko | Germany | 15 February 1997 | 29 May 1999 | 81 | 4 | 3 | 0 | 1 | 0 | 85 | 4 |
| Rillich, Frank | Germany | 22 August 1981 | 2 June 1991 | 112 | 4 | 13 | 1 | 0 | 0 | 125 | 5 |
| Röhrich, Volker | Germany | 7 April 1984 | 2 June 1991 | 146 | 49 | 19 | 11 | 2 | 0 | 167 | 60 |
| Rump, Manfred | Germany | 17 December 1961 | 19 May 1973 | 192 | 1 | 29 | 1 | 4 | 0 | 225 | 2 |
| Rydlewicz, René | Germany | 11 August 2000 | 10 May 2008 | 199 | 26 | 16 | 3 | 0 | 0 | 216 | 29 |
| Sackritz, Gerd | Germany | 5 November 1961 | 2 June 1971 | 199 | 11 | 26 | 2 | 6 | 1 | 231 | 14 |
| Sänger, Carsten | Germany | 12 July 1992 | 11 June 1994 | 73 | 0 | 5 | 1 | 0 | 0 | 78 | 1 |
| Schaller, Gerhard | Germany | 14 November 1954 | 15 October 1961 | 111 | 5 | 16 | 0 | 0 | 0 | 127 | 5 |
| Schied, Marcel | Germany | 16 March 2002 | 26 August 2007 | 59 | 10 | 5 | 2 | 0 | 0 | 64 | 12 |
| Schlünz, Juri | Germany | 16 September 1979 | 22 April 1994 | 356 | 77 | 46 | 18 | 3 | 0 | 406 | 95 |
| Schmidt, Erwin | Germany | 8 April 1956 | 15 October 1961 | 123 | 0 | 18 | 0 | 0 | 0 | 141 | 0 |
| Schneider, Dieter | Germany | 23 October 1968 | 3 May 1986 | 349 | 0 | 41 | 0 | 3 | 0 | 393 | 0 |
| Schneider, René | Germany | 14 August 1994 | 6 September 2000 | 73 | 13 | 4 | 0 | 0 | 0 | 77 | 13 |
| Schneider, Rudolf | Germany | 14 November 1954 | 8 June 1958 | 67 | 1 | 12 | 2 | 0 | 0 | 79 | 3 |
| Schober, Mathias | Germany | 4 August 2001 | 20 May 2007 | 191 | 0 | 14 | 0 | 0 | 0 | 206 | 0 |
| Schröbler, Manfred | Germany | 27 May 1956 | 2 November 1968 | 148 | 0 | 15 | 0 | 2 | 0 | 165 | 0 |
| Schühler, Helmut | Germany | 12 August 1967 | 19 June 1976 | 152 | 17 | 22 | 0 | 2 | 0 | 176 | 17 |
| Schulz, Axel | Germany | 14 August 1977 | 5 March 1993 | 321 | 51 | 41 | 10 | 2 | 0 | 364 | 61 |
| Sebastian, Tim | Germany | 7 November 2004 | 17 May 2008 | 98 | 3 | 7 | 0 | 0 | 0 | 105 | 3 |
| Seehaus, Klaus-Dieter | Germany | 16 September 1961 | 9 March 1974 | 261 | 4 | 36 | 3 | 8 | 0 | 305 | 7 |
| Seering, Jörg | Germany | 15 April 1972 | 30 October 1982 | 142 | 36 | 19 | 10 | 0 | 0 | 161 | 46 |
| Shapourzadeh, Amir | Iran Germany | 21 May 2005 | 17 May 2008 | 54 | 4 | 3 | 0 | 0 | 0 | 57 | 4 |
| Singer, Karl-Heinz | Germany | 14 November 1954 | 3 April 1960 | 129 | 0 | 20 | 0 | 0 | 0 | 149 | 0 |
| Speth, Hans | Germany | 24 April 1955 | 11 October 1959 | 104 | 29 | 14 | 7 | 0 | 0 | 118 | 36 |
| Stein, Marc | Germany | 22 February 2006 | 6 May 2008 | 73 | 4 | 4 | 0 | 0 | 0 | 77 | 4 |
| Streich, Joachim | Germany | 23 August 1969 | 24 May 1975 | 141 | 58 | 18 | 10 | 4 | 0 | 163 | 68 |
| Studer, Stefan | Germany | 12 August 1995 | 9 May 1998 | 89 | 6 | 4 | 0 | 0 | 0 | 93 | 6 |
| Sykora, Peter | Germany | 3 November 1965 | 9 June 1976 | 149 | 9 | 18 | 1 | 0 | 0 | 167 | 10 |
| Ullrich, Artur | Germany | 16 August 1986 | 26 May 1990 | 81 | 2 | 12 | 0 | 0 | 0 | 93 | 2 |
| Uteß, Jürgen | Germany | 18 September 1976 | 5 September 1987 | 265 | 23 | 31 | 3 | 0 | 0 | 296 | 26 |
| Wahl, Jens | Germany | 14 September 1985 | 6 June 1993 | 187 | 28 | 19 | 4 | 3 | 2 | 210 | 34 |
| Wandke, Hans-Joachim | Germany | 15 September 1973 | 15 April 1981 | 118 | 1 | 14 | 0 | 0 | 0 | 132 | 1 |
| Weichert, Florian | Germany | 20 December 1985 | 16 May 1992 | 89 | 19 | 5 | 1 | 3 | 0 | 98 | 21 |
| Weilandt, Hilmar | Germany | 20 August 1986 | 4 May 2002 | 365 | 17 | 36 | 3 | 4 | 0 | 405 | 20 |
| Werner, Mike | Germany | 9 March 1991 | 29 August 1995 | 111 | 2 | 7 | 0 | 0 | 0 | 118 | 2 |
| Wibrån, Peter | Sweden | 27 November 1998 | 24 May 2003 | 137 | 15 | 10 | 2 | 0 | 0 | 147 | 17 |
| Wruck, Dieter | Germany | 22 May 1960 | 11 October 1969 | 174 | 3 | 22 | 0 | 4 | 0 | 200 | 3 |
| Wruck, Wolfgang | Germany | 31 March 1963 | 26 December 1967 | 65 | 20 | 4 | 1 | 0 | 0 | 69 | 21 |
| Yasser, Radwan | Egypt | 28 August 1996 | 27 April 2002 | 133 | 5 | 7 | 1 | 2 | 0 | 142 | 6 |
| Zachhuber, Andreas | Germany | 18 August 1979 | 23 November 1985 | 77 | 7 | 12 | 0 | 0 | 0 | 89 | 7 |
| Zallmann, Marco | Germany | 12 August 1992 | 12 May 2001 | 201 | 9 | 14 | 1 | 1 | 0 | 216 | 10 |
| Zapf, Kurt | Germany | 14 November 1954 | 1 May 1967 | 242 | 4 | 34 | 0 | 0 | 0 | 276 | 4 |
| Zedel, Horst | Germany | 9 January 1955 | 17 October 1959 | 91 | 23 | 16 | 5 | 0 | 0 | 107 | 28 |
| Player | Nat. | First appearance | Last appearance | League | Goals | Cup | Goals | Continental | Goals | Total | Goals |
