= List of FC Hansa Rostock records and statistics =

This article has details on FC Hansa Rostock statistics.

== Recent seasons (from 1991 onwards) ==
Year	Division	Position	Points	Goal difference	Top goalscorers
1991–92	Bundesliga (I)	18th	31:45	-12	(Germany) Michael Spies 13, (Germany) Florian Weichert 6
1992–93	2. Bundesliga (II)	11th	46:46	+2	(Germany) Heiko März 9, (Germany) Olaf Bodden 8, (Germany) Timo Lange 6, (Poland) Sławomir Chałaśkiewicz 6, (Germany) Stefan Persigehl 5
1993–94	2. Bundesliga (II)	8th	39:37	-5	(Germany) Olaf Bodden 13, (Germany) Jens Dowe 9, (Germany) Timo Lange 6, (Poland) Sławomir Chałaśkiewicz 5
1994–95	2. Bundesliga (II)	1st	46:22	+36	(Germany) Stefan Beinlich 15, (Germany) Steffen Baumgart 10, (Germany) Rocco Milde 9, (Germany) René Schneider 6, (Germany) Timo Lange 6, (Poland) Jacek Mencel 6, (Poland) Sławomir Chałaśkiewicz 5
1995–96	Bundesliga (I)	6th	49	+4	(Germany) Stefan Beinlich 11, (Germany) Steffen Baumgart 10, (Nigeria) Jonathan Akpoborie 6, (Germany) René Schneider 6
1996–97	Bundesliga (I)	15th	40	-11	(Nigeria) Jonathan Akpoborie 14, (Germany) Stefan Beinlich 8
1997–98	Bundesliga (I)	6th	51	+8	(Bosnia and Herzegovina) Sergej Barbarez 11, (Germany) Oliver Neuville 8, (Croatia) Igor Pamić 7, (Germany) Jens Dowe 7, (Poland) Sławomir Majak 6
1998–99	Bundesliga (I)	14th	38	-9	(Germany) Oliver Neuville 14, (Croatia) Igor Pamić 6, (Nigeria) Victor Agali 6, (Poland) Sławomir Majak 5
1999–00	Bundesliga (I)	15th	38	-16	(Sweden) Magnus Arvidsson 9, (Nigeria) Victor Agali 6, (Sweden) Peter Wibrån 6
2000–01	Bundesliga (I)	12th	43	-13	(Nigeria) Victor Agali 5, (Germany) René Rydlewicz 5
2001–02	Bundesliga (I)	14th	34	-19	(Sweden) Magnus Arvidsson 5, (Germany) René Rydlewicz 5, (Germany) Markus Beierle 5
2002–03	Bundesliga (I)	13th	41	-6	(Sweden) Rade Prica 7, (Germany) René Rydlewicz 6
2003–04	Bundesliga (I)	9th	44	+1	(Germany) Martin Max 20, (Germany) René Rydlewicz 7, (Sweden) Magnus Arvidsson 6
2004–05	Bundesliga (I)	17th	30	-34	(Italy) Antonio Di Salvo 7, (Sweden) Rade Prica 6
2005–06	2. Bundesliga (II)	10th	43	-5	(Germany) Marcel Schied 9, (Germany) Enrico Kern 8
2006–07	2. Bundesliga (II)	2nd	62	+19	(Germany) Enrico Kern 12, (Montenegro) Đorđije Ćetković 7, (Germany) Christian Rahn 6, (Turkey) Zafer Yelen 5
2007–08	Bundesliga (I)	17th	30	-22	(Germany) Enrico Kern 7
2008–09	2. Bundesliga (II)	13th	38	-1	(Germany) Enrico Kern 11, (Germany) Mario Fillinger 8, (Germany) Fin Bartels 6, (Germany) Kevin Schindler 5
2009–10	2. Bundesliga (II)	16th	36	-12	(Germany) Fin Bartels 4, (Germany) Tobias Jänicke 4, (Germany) Tim Sebastian 4
2010–11	3. Liga (III)	2nd	78	+34	(Germany) Björn Ziegenbein 14, (Germany) Marcel Schied 11, (Germany) Mohammed Lartey 10, (Germany) Tobias Jänicke 9, (Serbia) Radovan Vujanović 7
2011–12	2. Bundesliga (II)	18th	27	-29	(Slovakia) Marek Mintál 6, (Sweden) Freddy Borg 5
2012–13	3. Liga (III)	12th	44	-13	(Netherlands) Johan Plat 10, (Czech Republic) Ondřej Smetana 8, (Germany) Tom Weilandt 7
2013–14	3. Liga (III)	13th	49	-10	(Germany) David Blacha 10, (Germany) Halil Savran 8, (Greece) Nikolaos Ioannidis 6
2014–15	3. Liga (III)	17th	41	-14	(Germany) Marcel Ziemer 15, (Germany) Christian Bickel 7, (Germany) Steven Ruprecht 6, (Germany) Halil Savran 6
2015–16	3. Liga (III)	10th	49	-6	(Switzerland) Stephan Andrist 7, (Germany) Tobias Jänicke 6, (Germany) Marcel Ziemer 6
2016–17	3. Liga (III)	15th	46	-2	(Switzerland) Stephan Andrist 11
2017–18	3. Liga (III)	6th	60	+14	(Germany) Soufian Benyamina 11, (Germany) Pascal Breier 6, (Germany) Bryan Henning 5
2018–19	3. Liga (III)	6th	55	+1	(Democratic Republic of the Congo) Merveille Biankadi 10, (Benin) Cebio Soukou 10, (Germany) Pascal Breier 7
2019–20	3. Liga (III)	6th	59	+11	(Germany) Pascal Breier 15, (Germany) Aaron Opoku 5, (Netherlands) John Verhoek 5
2020–21	3. Liga (III)	2nd	71	+19	(Netherlands) John Verhoek 12, (Germany) Bentley Baxter Bahn 7, (Germany) Pascal Breier 6
2021–22	2. Bundesliga (II)	13th	41	-11	(Netherlands) John Verhoek 17, (Germany) Hanno Behrens 5
2022–23	2. Bundesliga (II)	13th	41	-16	(Germany) Kai Pröger 10, (Germany) Lukas Fröde 5
2023–24	2. Bundesliga (II)	17th	31	-27	(Brazil) Júnior Brumado 4, (Colombia) Juan José Perea 4, (Germany) Kai Pröger 4
2024–25	3. Liga (III)	5th	60	+8	(Norway) Sigurd Hauso Haugen 10
2025–26	3. Liga (III)	5th	67	+25	(Denmark) Emil Holten 15

== Honours ==
- East German champions: 1991
- East German vice-champions: 1955, 1962, 1963, 1964, 1968
- East German Cup: 1991
- East German Cup finalists: 1955, 1957, 1960, 1967, 1987
- 2. Bundesliga champions: 1995
- German Indoor champions: 1998
- German Under 17 championship runners-up: 2005
