= 1986–87 FDGB-Pokal =

Tournament details
- Country: East Germany
- Dates: 9 August 1986 – 13 June 1987

Final positions
- Champions: 1. FC Lokomotive Leipzig
- Runners-up: FC Hansa Rostock

The 1986–87 FDGB-Pokal was the 36th edition of the East German Cup. The competition was won by 1. FC Lokomotive Leipzig, who beat Hansa Rostock 4–1 in the final. It was Leipzig's second consecutive victory in the FDGB-Pokal and fourth overall.

== Qualification round ==
Date	Home team	Result	Away team
9 August 1986	TSG Bau Rostock	1–2	BSG Wismut Aue II

== First round ==
Date	Home team	Result	Away team
11 October 1986	SG Dynamo Eisleben	1–0	BSG Wismut Aue
11 October 1986	BSG Aktivist Brieske-Senftenberg	2–2 (a.e.t.) (5–4 p)	FC Vorwärts Frankfurt
11 October 1986	FC Rot-Weiß Erfurt II	0–1	BSG Wismut Gera
11 October 1986	ASG Vorwärts Dessau	3–1	SG Dynamo Dresden II
11 October 1986	BSG Chemie Leipzig	2–1 (a.e.t.)	BSG Motor Nordhausen
11 October 1986	BSG Stahl Eisenhüttenstadt	3–1	BSG Fortschritt Bischofswerda
11 October 1986	BSG Aktivist Schwarze Pumpe	1–0	BSG Post Neubrandenburg
11 October 1986	BSG Glückauf Sondershausen	0–2	FC Carl Zeiss Jena
11 October 1986	BSG Chemie Buna Schkopau	2–1	FC Vorwärts Frankfurt II
11 October 1986	BSG Chemie Industriewerk Ilmenau	3–1	FC Energie Cottbus
11 October 1986	BSG Motor Weimar	1–2	FC Karl-Marx-Stadt
11 October 1986	BSG Lokomotive/Armaturen Prenzlau	1–3	BSG Chemie Böhlen
11 October 1986	BSG Motor Suhl	0–2	SG Dynamo Dresden
11 October 1986	BSG Fortschritt Weida	1–2	FC Rot-Weiß Erfurt
11 October 1986	BSG Motor Babelsberg	4–4 (a.e.t.) (4–2 p)	TSG Chemie Markkleeberg
11 October 1986	BSG Motor Fritz Heckert Karl-Marx-Stadt	3–1 (a.e.t.)	Berliner FC Dynamo II
11 October 1986	BSG Wismut Aue II	3–3 (a.e.t.) (4–5 p)	Hallescher FC Chemie
11 October 1986	BSG Robotron Sömmerda	0–3	1. FC Lokomotive Leipzig
11 October 1986	KWO Berlin	1–0 (a.e.t.)	BSG KKW Greifswald
11 October 1986	BSG Lokomotive RAW Cottbus	1–3	BSG Rotation Berlin
11 October 1986	BSG Stahl Riesa II	4–3	SG Dynamo Fürstenwalde
11 October 1986	BSG Stahl Walzwerk Hettstedt	1–4	BSG Sachsenring Zwickau
11 October 1986	BSG Aufbau dkk Krumhermersdorf	0–3	FC Carl Zeiss Jena II
11 October 1986	BSG Chemie Böhlen II	0–3	ASG Vorwärts Stralsund
11 October 1986	BSG Lokomotive Stendal	1–5	1. FC Union Berlin
11 October 1986	ASG Vorwärts Fünfeichen	0–2	BSG Stahl Brandenburg
11 October 1986	BSG Chemie Velten	3–1	SG Dynamo Schwerin
11 October 1986	TSG Wismar	1–5	FC Hansa Rostock
11 October 1986	ISG Schwerin	3–2	BSG Motor Grimma
11 October 1986	BSG Aktivist Kali Werra Tiefenort	0–5	BSG Stahl Riesa
11 October 1986	BSG Motor Eberswalde	0–7	Berliner FC Dynamo
11 October 1986	Hallescher FC Chemie II	0–3	1. FC Magdeburg

== Second round ==
Date	Home team	Result	Away team
8 November 1986	BSG Chemie Böhlen	1–0	Berliner FC Dynamo
8 November 1986	ISG Schwerin	0–1	BSG Stahl Brandenburg
8 November 1986	BSG Motor Fritz Heckert Karl-Marx-Stadt	0–1	BSG Stahl Riesa
8 November 1986	FC Carl Zeiss Jena II	0–5	1. FC Lokomotive Leipzig
8 November 1986	BSG Stahl Riesa II	0–2	1. FC Union Berlin
8 November 1986	BSG Chemie Velten	0–2	SG Dynamo Dresden
8 November 1986	FC Hansa Rostock	2–1	1. FC Magdeburg
8 November 1986	BSG Chemie Buna Schkopau	2–3 (a.e.t.)	FC Rot-Weiß Erfurt
8 November 1986	ASG Vorwärts Dessau	0–2	FC Carl Zeiss Jena
8 November 1986	SG Dynamo Eisleben	2–2 (a.e.t.) (6–7 p)	FC Karl-Marx-Stadt
8 November 1986	KWO Berlin	4–0	BSG Chemie Industriewerk Ilmenau
8 November 1986	BSG Wismut Gera	2–1	BSG Stahl Eisenhüttenstadt
8 November 1986	BSG Aktivist Brieske-Senftenberg	1–0	BSG Aktivist Schwarze Pumpe
8 November 1986	Hallescher FC Chemie	4–1	ASG Vorwärts Stralsund
8 November 1986	BSG Sachsenring Zwickau	3–2	BSG Motor Babelsberg
8 November 1986	BSG Chemie Leipzig	1–0	BSG Rotation Berlin

== Third round ==
Date	Home team	Result	Away team
6 December 1986	SG Dynamo Dresden	4–1	FC Rot-Weiß Erfurt
6 December 1986	Hallescher FC Chemie	0–1	BSG Stahl Riesa
6 December 1986	FC Karl-Marx-Stadt	0–0 (a.e.t.) (4–3 p)	1. FC Union Berlin
6 December 1986	FC Hansa Rostock	3–1	BSG Chemie Böhlen
7 December 1986	1. FC Lokomotive Leipzig	4–1	KWO Berlin
7 December 1986	BSG Stahl Brandenburg	3–0	BSG Aktivist Brieske-Senftenberg
7 December 1986	BSG Wismut Gera	0–3	BSG Sachsenring Zwickau
7 December 1986	BSG Chemie Leipzig	2–1	FC Carl Zeiss Jena

== Quarter-finals ==
Date	Home team	Result	Away team
15 April 1987	SG Dynamo Dresden	0–2	1. FC Lokomotive Leipzig
15 April 1987	BSG Sachsenring Zwickau	1–2	FC Karl-Marx-Stadt
15 April 1987	BSG Stahl Riesa	0–1	BSG Stahl Brandenburg
15 April 1987	FC Hansa Rostock	3–1	BSG Chemie Leipzig

== Semi-finals ==
Date	Home team	Result	Away team
19 May 1987	FC Karl-Marx-Stadt	1–3	1. FC Lokomotive Leipzig
20 May 1987	FC Hansa Rostock	1–0	BSG Stahl Brandenburg

== Final ==
1986–87 FDGB-Pokal
13 June 1987
Final

1. FC Lokomotive Leipzig	4–1	FC Hansa Rostock
Kühn 22', 58'; Marschall 66'; Leitzke 87'		März 21'

Stadion der Weltjugend, East Berlin
Attendance: 47,000
Referee: Adolf Prokop

1. FC LOKOMOTIVE LEIPZIG:
GK	(East Germany) René Müller
DF	(East Germany) Frank Baum
DF	(East Germany) Uwe Zötzsche
DF	(East Germany) Matthias Lindner
DF	(East Germany) Ronald Kreer
DF	(East Germany) Heiko Scholz
MF	(East Germany) Matthias Liebers	(substituted off) 78'
MF	(East Germany) Uwe Bredow
FW	(East Germany) Hans Richter	(substituted off) 85'
FW	(East Germany) Olaf Marschall
FW	(East Germany) Dieter Kühn
Substitutes:
MF	(East Germany) Wolfgang Altmann	(substituted in) 78'
FW	(East Germany) Hans-Jörg Leitzke	(substituted in) 85'
Manager:
(East Germany) Hans-Ulrich Thomale

HANSA ROSTOCK:
GK	(East Germany) Axel Hauschild
DF	(East Germany) Bernd Arnholdt
DF	(East Germany) Gernot Alms
DF	(East Germany) Heiko März
DF	(East Germany) Hilmar Weilandt	(substituted off) 64'
MF	(East Germany) Axel Schulz	(substituted off) 70'
MF	(East Germany) Juri Schlünz
MF	(Germany) Norbert Littmann
FW	(East Germany) Volker Röhrich
FW	(East Germany) Axel Kruse
FW	(East Germany) Rainer Jarohs
Substitutes:
DF	(East Germany) Artur Ullrich	(substituted in) 64'
FW	(East Germany) Maik Wendorf	(substituted in) 70'
Manager:
(East Germany) Werner Voigt
