= 1980 UEFA European Under-18 Championship squads =

Player listings in youth football competition

Players in bold have later been capped at full international level.

== Group A ==
=== Hungary ===
Head coach: Jenö Dalnoki

No.	Pos.	Player	Date of birth (age)	Caps	Goals	Club
	GK	László Szieben	3 October 1961 (aged 18)			(Hungarian Football Federation) Zalaegerszeg
	DF	Sándor Cseke	29 October 1961 (aged 18)			(Hungarian Football Federation) MTK–VM
	DF	Ferenc Csik	6 June 1962 (aged 17)			(Hungarian Football Federation) Veszprém FC
	DF	János Grósz	9 June 1962 (aged 17)			(Hungarian Football Federation) Ferencvárosi TC
	DF	Róbert Horváth	29 March 1962 (aged 18)			(Hungarian Football Federation) Ferencvárosi TC
	DF	János Szert	18 January 1962 (aged 18)			(Hungarian Football Federation) Kazincbarcika
	MF	**Gyula Hajszán**	9 October 1961 (aged 18)			(Hungarian Football Federation) Győr
	MF	Pál Hoffmeister				(Hungarian Football Federation) Kecskeméti SC
	MF	Ádám Kurucz	1 August 1961 (aged 18)			(Hungarian Football Federation) Békéscsaba
	MF	Miklós Szlifka	12 February 1962 (aged 18)			(Hungarian Football Federation) Diósgyőri VTK
	FW	**György Bognár**	5 November 1961 (aged 18)			(Hungarian Football Federation) MTK Budapest
	FW	Károly Horváth	29 November 1962 (aged 17)			(Hungarian Football Federation) Ferencvárosi TC
	FW	**József Kiprich**	6 September 1963 (aged 16)			(Hungarian Football Federation) Tatabányai Bányász
	FW	Sándor Murai				(Hungarian Football Federation) Videoton SC
	FW	Jenő Takács	20 September 1962 (aged 17)			(Hungarian Football Federation) Zalaegerszeg

=== Italy ===
Head coach: Italo Acconcia

No.	Pos.	Player	Date of birth (age)	Caps	Club
	GK	Raffaele Di Fusco	6 October 1961 (aged 18)		(Italy) Napoli
	GK	Carlo Riccetelli	2 January 1962 (aged 18)		(Italy) Empoli
	DF	**Dario Bonetti**	5 August 1961 (aged 18)		(Italy) Brescia
	DF	Pasquale Bruno	9 June 1962 (aged 17)		(Italy) Lecce
	DF	Mauro Chiampan	26 April 1962 (aged 18)		(Italy) Juventus
	DF	Pietro Mariani	9 June 1962 (aged 17)		(Italy) Torino
	DF	William Pederzoli	15 August 1961 (aged 18)		(Italy) Bologna
	MF	**Giuseppe Galderisi**	22 March 1963 (aged 17)		(Italy) Juventus
	MF	Marcello Gamberini	10 October 1961 (aged 18)		(Italy) Bologna
	MF	Giovanni Koetting	10 March 1962 (aged 18)		(Italy) Juventus
	MF	Walter Mostosi	24 June 1962 (aged 17)		(Italy) Atalanta
	MF	Pasquale D'Oriano	8 October 1961 (aged 18)		(Italy) Milan
	FW	Roberto Antelmi	18 October 1961 (aged 18)		(Italy) Juventus
	FW	Norberto Cappellari	16 September 1961 (aged 18)		(Italy) Torino
	FW	Andrea Manzo	5 November 1961 (aged 18)		(Italy) Lanerossi Vicenza

=== Norway ===
Head coach:

No.	Pos.	Player	Date of birth (age)	Caps	Club
	GK	**Frode Hansen**	10 August 1961 (aged 18)		(Norway) Fredrikstad FK
	GK	Geir Mediås	6 February 1962 (aged 18)		(Norway) Steinkjer FK
	DF	Stein Egli Furuli			
	DF	Rune Robert Hagen			
	DF	**Jan Halvor Halvorsen**	8 March 1963 (aged 17)		(Norway) Pors Grenland
	DF	Hakon Madsen	17 November 1961 (aged 18)		(Norway) Bøler IF
	DF	Bjorn Solum	18 August 1961 (aged 18)		(Norway) Lyn
	DF	Stale Stavem			
	DF	Atle Vervik	17 August 1961 (aged 18)		(Norway) Viking
	MF	Cato Andersen	25 June 1962 (aged 17)		(Norway) Viking
	MF	Hans-Julius Edvardsen			
	MF	Knut-Inge Svela	14 September 1961 (aged 18)		(Norway) Viking
	MF	Lars Petter Tennfjord			
	FW	Kjell Egge			
	FW	Pal Fjeldstad	11 February 1962 (aged 18)		(Norway) Brann
	FW	**Nils Ove Hellvik**	25 July 1962 (aged 17)		(Norway) Bryne

=== Spain ===
Head coach: Jesús María Pereda

No.	Pos.	Player	Date of birth (age)	Caps	Club
	GK	Rubio Antonio Serrano	12 August 1962 (aged 17)		(Spain) Recreativo Oscus
	GK	**Andoni Zubizarreta**	23 October 1961 (aged 18)		(Spain) Deportivo Alavés
	DF	Francisco José Bolaos Carcelén	24 December 1961 (aged 18)		(Spain) Bilbao Athletic
	DF	Jorge Fabregat	5 March 1963 (aged 17)		(Spain) Terrassa
	DF	Antonio Iriarte Cela	4 December 1961 (aged 18)		(Spain) Barcelona
	DF	Jesús García Jiménez	27 December 1961 (aged 18)		(Spain) Rayo Vallecano
	DF	José Antonio Almenara Montoya	30 December 1961 (aged 18)		(Spain) Algeciras CF
	DF	Tolo Ocaña	2 August 1961 (aged 18)		(Spain) Albacete
	DF	Alberto Vallina	11 November 1961 (aged 18)		(Spain) CD Ensidesa
	MF	**Roberto Fernández Bonillo**	9 July 1962 (aged 17)		(Spain) CD Castellón
	MF	José Alfredo Haz Garrido	30 September 1962 (aged 17)		(Spain) Fabril
	MF	**Míchel**	23 March 1963 (aged 17)		(Spain) Real Madrid
	MF	Pascual Luna Parra	27 February 1963 (aged 17)		(Spain) Hércules
	MF	Luiso Saavedra	2 November 1962 (aged 17)		(Spain) Las Palmas
	FW	Reces Casero	20 March 1962 (aged 18)		(Spain) Hércules
	FW	Tico	16 December 1962 (aged 17)		(Spain) CD Castellón
	FW	Urbano Ortega Cuadros	11 December 1961 (aged 18)		(Spain) Real Jaén

== Group B ==
=== Bulgaria ===
Head coach:

=== East Germany ===
Head coach: Werner Basel

No.	Pos.	Player	Date of birth (age)	Caps	Goals	Club
	GK	Markus Henkel	27 December 1961 (aged 18)			(Deutscher Fußball-Verband der DDR) 1. FC Magdeburg
	GK	Thomas Michalowski	7 August 1962 (aged 17)			(Deutscher Fußball-Verband der DDR) FC Rot-Weiß Erfurt
	DF	Bernd Nemetschek	17 August 1961 (aged 18)			(Deutscher Fußball-Verband der DDR) FC Rot-Weiß Erfurt
	DF	Lutz Radtke	17 May 1962 (aged 17)			(Deutscher Fußball-Verband der DDR) HFC Chemie
	DF	Thomas Rath	13 September 1962 (aged 17)			(Deutscher Fußball-Verband der DDR) BFC Dynamo
	DF	Frank Rillich	14 November 1962 (aged 17)			(Deutscher Fußball-Verband der DDR) FC Hansa Rostock
	DF	**Carsten Sänger**	8 November 1962 (aged 17)			(Deutscher Fußball-Verband der DDR) FC Rot-Weiß Erfurt
	MF	Uwe Bredow	22 August 1961 (aged 18)			(Deutscher Fußball-Verband der DDR) 1. FC Lokomotive Leipzig
	MF	**Rainer Ernst**	31 December 1961 (aged 18)			(Deutscher Fußball-Verband der DDR) BFC Dynamo
	MF	Jochen Illert	20 August 1961 (aged 18)			(Deutscher Fußball-Verband der DDR) BFC Dynamo
	MF	Lars Petzold	17 September 1961 (aged 18)			(Deutscher Fußball-Verband der DDR) BFC Dynamo
	FW	Peter Englisch	12 March 1962 (aged 18)	1		(Deutscher Fußball-Verband der DDR) 1. FC Lokomotive Leipzig
	FW	Falko Götz	26 March 1962 (aged 18)			(Deutscher Fußball-Verband der DDR) BFC Dynamo
	FW	**Damian Halata**	8 August 1962 (aged 17)			(Deutscher Fußball-Verband der DDR) 1. FC Magdeburg
	FW	Gerd Seifert	29 July 1962 (aged 17)			(Deutscher Fußball-Verband der DDR) Dynamo Dresden
	FW	Andreas Zachhuber	29 May 1962 (aged 17)			(Deutscher Fußball-Verband der DDR) FC Hansa Rostock

=== France ===
Head coach: Bologne

No.	Pos.	Player	Date of birth (age)	Caps	Goals	Club
	GK	Marc Lévy	7 August 1961 (aged 18)			(French Football Federation) Olympique de Marseille
	DF	**Bernard Casoni**	15 April 1961 (aged 19)			(French Football Federation) AS Cannes
	DF	Michele Der Zakarin	18 February 1963 (aged 17)			(French Football Federation) FC Nantes
	DF	**Fabrice Poullain**	27 August 1962 (aged 17)			(French Football Federation) FC Nantes
	DF	Claude Puel	2 September 1962 (aged 17)			(French Football Federation) AS Monaco
	DF	**Daniel Bravo**	9 February 1963 (aged 17)			(French Football Federation) OGC Nice
	DF	**Jean-Marc Ferreri**	26 December 1962 (aged 17)			(French Football Federation) AJ Auxerre
	MF	Jacques Glassmann	22 July 1962 (aged 17)			(French Football Federation) Strasbourg
	MF	Laurent Piniarski	7 October 1961 (aged 18)			(French Football Federation) AS Monaco
	FW	**Philippe Anziani**	21 September 1961 (aged 18)			(French Football Federation) FC Sochaux-Montbéliard
	FW	Pierre Morice	25 March 1962 (aged 18)			(French Football Federation) FC Nantes
	FW	Laurent Paganelli	22 October 1962 (aged 17)			(French Football Federation) AS Saint-Étienne
	FW	**Jean-Luc Sassus**	4 October 1962 (aged 17)			(French Football Federation) Toulouse

=== Netherlands ===
Head coach: Ger Block

No.	Pos.	Player	Date of birth (age)	Caps	Club
	GK	Sjaak Storm	1 August 1961 (aged 18)		(Netherlands) Ajax
	GK	Arend Keuch			(Netherlands) AZ '67
	DF	Marco de Vroedt	18 October 1961 (aged 18)		(Netherlands) ADO Den Haag
	DF	Tjalling Dilling	26 September 1961 (aged 18)		(Netherlands) FC Twente
	DF	René Kraay	29 September 1961 (aged 18)		(Netherlands) Ajax
	DF	René Maessen	19 March 1962 (aged 18)		(Netherlands) Fortuna Sittard
	DF	**Fred Rutten**	5 December 1961 (aged 18)		(Netherlands) FC Twente
	MF	**Danny Blind**	1 August 1961 (aged 18)		(Netherlands) Sparta Rotterdam
	MF	Jan Gaasbeek	4 December 1962 (aged 17)		(Netherlands) DOVO
	MF	**Ruud Gullit**	1 September 1962 (aged 17)		(Netherlands) HFC Haarlem
	MF	**Erwin Koeman**	20 September 1961 (aged 18)		(Netherlands) PSV Eindhoven
	MF	**Frank Rijkaard**	30 September 1962 (aged 17)		(Netherlands) Ajax
	MF	Ton van Leur	4 October 1961 (aged 18)		(Netherlands) FC Utrecht
	FW	Ben Haverkort	27 October 1961 (aged 18)		(Netherlands) Ajax
	FW	John Holshuijsen	28 October 1961 (aged 18)		(Netherlands) Ajax
	FW	**Wim Kieft**	12 November 1962 (aged 17)		(Netherlands) Ajax

== Group C ==
=== Finland ===
Head coach:

=== West Germany ===
Head coach: Dietrich Weise

No.	Pos.	Player	Date of birth (age)	Caps	Goals	Club
	GK	Ralf Collmann	30 June 1962 (aged 17)			(German Football Association) 1. FC Saarbrücken
	DF	Michael Nushöhr	14 August 1962 (aged 17)			(German Football Association) FC Bayern München
	DF	**Alois Reinhardt**	18 November 1961 (aged 18)			(German Football Association) 1. FC Nürnberg
	DF	Ralf Sievers	30 October 1961 (aged 18)			(German Football Association) Lüneburger SK
	DF	Thomas Siewert	4 November 1961 (aged 18)			(German Football Association) FC Schalke 04
	DF	Martin Trieb	23 September 1961 (aged 18)			(German Football Association) FC Augsburg
	MF	Harald Kügler	15 February 1962 (aged 18)			(German Football Association) FC Schalke 04
	MF	Ralf Loose	5 January 1963 (aged 17)			(German Football Association) Borussia Dortmund
	MF	Reinhold Mathy	12 April 1962 (aged 18)			(German Football Association) FC Bayern München
	MF	Michael Opitz	16 July 1962 (aged 17)			(German Football Association) FC Schalke 04
	MF	Günther Schäfer	9 June 1962 (aged 17)			(German Football Association) VfB Stuttgart
	FW	Axel Brummer	25 November 1961 (aged 18)			(German Football Association) 1. FC Kaiserslautern
	FW	Leo Bunk	23 October 1962 (aged 17)			(German Football Association) FC Augsburg
	FW	Günther Thiele	7 November 1961 (aged 18)			(German Football Association) Fortuna Düsseldorf
	FW	Helmut Winklhofer	27 August 1961 (aged 18)			(German Football Association) FC Bayern München

=== Poland ===
Head coach: (Poland) Henryk Apostel

No.	Pos.	Player	Date of birth (age)	Caps	Goals	Club
	GK	Robert Gaszyński	9 September 1961 (aged 18)			(Polish Football Association) Wisła Kraków
	GK	Janusz Przybyłka	11 April 1962 (aged 18)			(Polish Football Association) Polonia Bytom
	GK	Jerzy Zajda	19 May 1963 (aged 16)			(Polish Football Association) Zagłębie Wałbrzych
	DF	Jerzy Matys	22 November 1961 (aged 18)			(Polish Football Association) Śląsk Wrocław
	DF	**Piotr Skrobowski**	16 October 1961 (aged 18)			(Polish Football Association) Wisła Kraków
	DF	**Dariusz Wdowczyk**	25 September 1962 (aged 17)			(Polish Football Association) Gwardia Warszawa
	DF	Marek Podsiadło	9 September 1961 (aged 18)			(Polish Football Association) Cracovia
	DF	Grzegorz Wesołowski	12 March 1962 (aged 18)			(Polish Football Association) ŁKS Łódź
	DF	**Zbigniew Kaczmarek**	1 June 1962 (aged 17)			(Polish Football Association) Stoczniowiec Gdańsk
	MF	**Mirosław Pękala**	15 October 1961 (aged 18)			(Polish Football Association) Śląsk Wrocław
	MF	**Waldemar Matysik**	22 September 1961 (aged 18)			(Polish Football Association) Górnik Zabrze
	MF	Ryszard Liszka	23 November 1961 (aged 18)			(Polish Football Association) Cracovia
	MF	**Ryszard Tarasiewicz**	27 April 1962 (aged 18)			(Polish Football Association) Śląsk Wrocław
	MF	**Piotr Rzepka**	13 September 1961 (aged 18)			(Polish Football Association) Gwardia Koszalin
	MF	Paweł Karaś	14 January 1962 (aged 18)			(Polish Football Association) Siarka Tarnobrzeg
	MF	Jerzy Kowalik	15 October 1961 (aged 18)			(Polish Football Association) Wisła Kraków
	FW	Erwin Koźlik	4 February 1962 (aged 18)			(Polish Football Association) Górnik Zabrze
	FW	**Dariusz Dziekanowski**	30 September 1962 (aged 17)			(Polish Football Association) Gwardia Warszawa
	FW	Marek Siwa	17 August 1961 (aged 18)			(Polish Football Association) Pogoń Szczecin
	FW	Mirosław Makurat	16 December 1961 (aged 18)			(Polish Football Association) Arka Gdynia

=== Romania ===
Head coach:

== Group D ==
=== England ===
Head coach: John Cartwright

No.	Pos.	Player	Date of birth (age)	Caps	Goals	Club
	GK	Mark Kendall	10 October 1961 (aged 18)			(The Football Association) Aston Villa
	DF	Tommy Caton	6 October 1962 (aged 17)			(The Football Association) Manchester City
	DF	Colin Pates	18 January 1962 (aged 18)			(The Football Association) Chelsea
	DF	Neil Banfield	20 January 1962 (aged 18)			(The Football Association) Crystal Palace
	DF	David Barnes	16 November 1961 (aged 18)			(The Football Association) Coventry City
	MF	Andy Peake	1 November 1961 (aged 18)			(The Football Association) Leicester City
	MF	Terry Gibson	23 December 1962 (aged 17)			(The Football Association) Tottenham Hotspur
	MF	Paul Allen	28 August 1962 (aged 17)			(The Football Association) West Ham United
	MF	Steve MacKenzie	23 November 1961 (aged 18)			(The Football Association) Manchester City
	MF	**Gary Mabbutt**	23 August 1961 (aged 18)			(The Football Association) Bristol Rovers
	FW	Terry Connor	9 November 1962 (aged 17)			(The Football Association) Leeds United
	FW	Tommy English	10 October 1961 (aged 18)			(The Football Association) Coventry City
	FW	**Mark Hateley**	7 November 1961 (aged 18)			(The Football Association) Coventry City

=== Northern Ireland ===
Head coach:

=== Portugal ===
Head coach: Jesualdo Ferreira

No.	Pos.	Player	Date of birth (age)	Caps	Goals	Club
	GK	Carlos Ferreira	21 October 1962 (aged 17)			(Portuguese Football Federation) Sporting
	GK	Vítor Nóvoa	17 August 1962 (aged 17)			(Portuguese Football Federation) FC Porto
	DF	**João Pinto**	21 November 1961 (aged 18)			(Portuguese Football Federation) FC Porto
	DF	**Dito**	18 January 1962 (aged 18)			(Portuguese Football Federation) Braga
	DF	Carlos Pereira	25 December 1962 (aged 17)			(Portuguese Football Federation) Benfica
	MF	**Jaime Magalhães**	10 July 1962 (aged 17)			(Portuguese Football Federation) FC Porto
	MF	**Carlos Xavier**	26 January 1962 (aged 18)			(Portuguese Football Federation) Sporting
	MF	**Mário Jorge**	24 August 1961 (aged 18)			(Portuguese Football Federation) Sporting
	MF	Toni	20 April 1962 (aged 18)			(Portuguese Football Federation) Benfica
	MF	Quinito	8 September 1961 (aged 18)			(Portuguese Football Federation) FC Porto
	MF	João António	1 September 1961 (aged 18)			(Portuguese Football Federation) Benfica
	MF	Pacheco	26 January 1963 (aged 17)			(Portuguese Football Federation) Benfica
	MF	Paulo Padinha	9 November 1962 (aged 17)			(Portuguese Football Federation) Benfica
	MF	Nélson Santos	17 March 1963 (aged 17)			(Portuguese Football Federation) Benfica
	FW	Fernando Cruz	29 April 1962 (aged 18)			(Portuguese Football Federation) Vitória de Setúbal
	FW	**José Coelho**	5 August 1961 (aged 18)			(Portuguese Football Federation) FC Porto

=== Yugoslavia ===
Head coach:
