= André Barbosa =

Swiss footballer (born 2000)

Personal information
- Full name: André Barbosa da Silva
- Date of birth: 27 August 2000 (age 26)
- Place of birth: Zürich, Switzerland
- Height: 1.77 m (5 ft 10 in)
- Positions: Centre-back; right-back

Youth career
- –2019: Grasshoppers
- 2018–2019: → SC Freiburg (loan)

Senior career*
Years	Team	Apps	(Gls)
2019–2023	SC Freiburg II	22	(0)
2023	Schaffhausen	6	(0)

International career
2017	Switzerland U17	1	(0)
2017	Switzerland U18	2	(0)
2018	Switzerland U19	3	(0)
2019	Switzerland U20	1	(0)
- * Club domestic league appearances and goals as of 15 December 2023

André Barbosa da Silva (born 27 August 2000) is a Swiss professional footballer who plays as a centre-back or right-back.

== Club career ==
On 14 September 2023, Barbosa signed a contract with Schaffhausen until the end of 2023, with an option to extend.

== Career statistics ==
=== Club ===
As of match played 14 January 2023

Appearances and goals by club, season and competition
Club	Season	League			Cup		Continental		Other		Total	
Club	Season	Division	Apps	Goals	Apps	Goals	Apps	Goals	Apps	Goals	Apps	Goals
SC Freiburg II	2019–20	Regionalliga Südwest	6	0	—		—		—		6	0
SC Freiburg II	2020–21	Regionalliga Südwest	3	0	—		—		—		3	0
SC Freiburg II	2021–22	3. Liga	10	0	—		—		—		10	0
SC Freiburg II	2022–23	3. Liga	3	0	—		—		—		3	0
Career total			22	0	0	0	0	0	0	0	22	0
