= KWO =

KWO may refer to:

- Obrigheim Nuclear Power Plant (Kernkraftwerk Obrigheim)
- Kraftwerke Oberhasli, Swiss company
- KWO Berlin, football club
- KWO, Overwatch Player
- Kojima World Order
