= Joakim Persson (footballer, born 1975) =

Swedish footballer and manager

Personal information
- Full name: Björn Joakim Persson
- Date of birth: 3 April 1975 (age 51)
- Place of birth: Helsingborg, Sweden
- Positions: Midfielder; defender

Youth career
- –1992: Högaborgs BK

Senior career*
Years	Team	Apps	(Gls)
1992–1996	Malmö FF	54	(8)
1996–1997	Atalanta	12	(0)
1998–1999	IFK Göteborg	38	(4)
2000–2002	Esbjerg fB	69	(6)
2002–2005	Hansa Rostock	84	(1)
2005–2006	Stabæk	29	(2)
2007–2010	Landskrona BoIS	78	(2)
Total		364	(23)

International career
1992–1993	Sweden U19	5	(1)
1994–1998	Sweden U21	25	(8)
1995	Sweden B	1	(0)
1997	Sweden	3	(1)

Managerial career
- 2011–2015: Ängelholms FF
- 2016–2017: Kristianstad FC
- 2018–2023: Varbergs BoIS
- 2023–2024: Horsens
- * Club domestic league appearances and goals

Björn Joakim Persson (born 3 April 1975) is a Swedish football manager and former player. As a player, he represented Malmö FF, Atalanta, IFK Göteborg, Esbjerg fB, Hansa Rostock, Stabæk, and Landskrona BoIS during a career that spanned between 1992 and 2010. He also represented the Sweden national team, winning three caps and scoring one goal in 1997.

== Club career ==
=== Early career ===
Born in Helsingborg, Persson began his career as a youth-team player with Högaborgs BK before moving to Malmö FF in 1992. He made his professional debut in a Swedish Cup game against Landskrona in 1994.

=== Atalanta and return to Sweden ===
Persson moved to the Italian Serie A club Atalanta in 1996. He returned to Sweden after less than two seasons in Italy, having very rarely played for Atalanta's first-team, joining IFK Göteborg in January 1998. Things went little better for him in Sweden. He was often singled out by the media as the main cause of his team's poor performances throughout his two seasons with Göteborg. After the 1998 season he was voted as the "most overrated player" in the Allsvenskan by his fellow players.

=== Esbjerg fB ===
At the end of the 1999 season, Persson left IFK Göteborg in order to escape the intense scrutiny he had been subjected to. He joined Esbjerg fB, of the Danish Superliga, midway through the league season, at the end of which they were relegated to the Danish 1st Division. Persson stayed with the club and helped them to win the first division championship, and promotion, at the first attempt.

=== Hansa Rostock ===
In the summer of 2002, after one further season with Esbjerg, Persson moved to Hansa Rostock of the German Bundesliga. Along with Andreas Jakobsson, Marcus Lantz, Peter Wibrån, Magnus Arvidsson and Rade Prica, Persson was one of six Swedes playing for the Mecklenburg club. Under manager Armin Veh he played as a holding midfielder, making 26 appearances in his first season with the club. The following season began with four successive defeats, after which Veh handed in his resignation and was replaced by Juri Schlünz. Schlünz converted Persson from a midfielder into a defender and appointed him as the leader of the team's back four. After making just one substitute appearance in the first six games of the season, Persson went on to start 27 of the last 28 games. He scored his only league goal for Hansa in a 1–1 draw with Borussia Mönchengladbach on 1 November 2003. Hansa finished the season in ninth place. Persson made 30 league starts during the 2004–05 season but was unable to prevent Hansa from finishing second-bottom of the league and being relegated to the 2. Bundesliga.

=== Later career and retirement ===
Following Hansa Rostock's relegation, Persson left the club to join Stabæk in Norway's Tippeligaen. Although he had been offered a longer contract, Persson decided to return to Sweden after 18 months in Norway. Persson signed with Landskrona prior to the 2007 Superettan season. before retiring in 2010.

== International career ==
Persson made 25 appearances for the Sweden U21s, scoring eight goals. He also made five appearances for Sweden at junior level, scoring one goal.

Persson also made three appearances for the Sweden men's national football team, all of which came in the 1997 King's Cup. He played in games against Romania and Japan before playing in the final against the hosts Thailand. Persson scored a goal in the final, helping the Swedes to a 3–1 win.

== Managerial career ==
After having managed Ängelholms FF and Kristianstad FC, Persson became manager of Varbergs BoIS in 2018.

In June 2023 Persson left Varberg to becamoe new manager of the Danish club AC Horsens. On 13 March 2024 Horsens confirmed that Persson had been fired. The sacking came in the wake of a prolonged period of strong dissatisfaction from the club's fans over the team's performance over a long period of time.

== Personal life ==
Persson is the father of three children.

== Career statistics ==
=== International ===
Appearances and goals by national team and year
National team	Year	Apps	Goals
Sweden	1997	3	1
Total		3	1

Scores and results list Sweden's goal tally first, score column indicates score after each Persson goal.

List of international goals scored by Joakim Persson
No.	Date	Venue	Opponent	Score	Result	Competition	Ref.
1	16 January 1997	National Stadium, Bangkok, Thailand	Thailand	2–0	3–1	1997 King's Cup	

== Honours ==
Sweden

- King's Cup: 1997
