= Alexander Bazdrigiannis =

German footballer (born 2002)

Personal information
- Date of birth: 18 February 2002 (age 24)
- Height: 1.75 m (5 ft 9 in)
- Position: Forward

Team information
- Current team: Wacker Burghausen
- Number: 29

Youth career
- –2013: 1860 Munich
- 2013–2020: Bayern Munich
- 2020–: SC Freiburg

Senior career*
Years	Team	Apps	(Gls)
2021–2022	SC Freiburg II	5	(0)
2022–2023	1. FC Schweinfurt 05	17	(0)
2023–	Wacker Burghausen	14	(1)
- * Club domestic league appearances and goals as of 30 April 2024

Alexander Bazdrigiannis (born 18 February 2002) is a German footballer who plays as a forward for Wacker Burghausen.

== Personal life ==
Born in Germany, Bazdrigiannis is of Greek descent.

== Career statistics ==
As of 1 July 2022

Appearances and goals by club, season and competition
Club	Season	League			Cup		Continental		Other		Total	
Club	Season	Division	Apps	Goals	Apps	Goals	Apps	Goals	Apps	Goals	Apps	Goals
SC Freiburg II	2021–22	3. Liga	5	0	–		–		0	0	5	0
Career total			5	0	0	0	0	0	0	0	5	0
