= Schlünz =

Schlünz is a surname. Notable people with the surname include:

- Annette Schlünz (born 1964), German musician and composer
- Juri Schlünz (born 1961), German footballer and coach
