= Greifswalder SV 04 =

German football club

- Full name: Greifswalder Sportverein 04 e.V.
- Founded: 1890 (merger of SSV Grün-Schwarz Greifswald, ESV/Empor Greifswald, and Greifswalder SV 98); 1 January 1904
- Dissolved: 2015
- Ground: Volksstadion
- Capacity: 8,000
- League: defunct
- 2014–15: Verbandsliga Mecklenburg-Vorpommern (VI), 6th
Home colours	Away colours

Greifswalder SV 04 was a German association football club from the city of Greifswald, Mecklenburg-Vorpommern. The club was formed out of the merger of SSV Grün-Schwarz Greifswald, ESV/Empor Greifswald, and Greifswalder SV 98. In addition to its football side the club had departments for athletics, badminton, basketball, dance and rhythmic gymnastics.

The merger of the three clubs made SV the second-largest club in Mecklenburg-Western Pomerania with some 1400 members. The club had a strong focus on youth football and had links to a number of area schools. It also had a DFB-affiliated training centre and had sent on several players to FC Hansa Rostock and state select teams.

In March 2015 the club decided to merge with FC Pommern Greifswald to form Greifswalder FC.

== Greifswalder SC ==
Until the end of the 2002–03 season, the biggest club in Greifswald was Greifswalder SC, who played in the NOFV-Oberliga Nord from 1991 until 2002. The club merged in 2003 with ESV Greifswald for financial reasons and thereby dissolved. Through ESV, Greifswalder SV 04 is therefore carrying on with SC's tradition. SC played its last game on 31 May 2003, beating SV Blau Weiss Polz 5–2.

The new club played in the tier five Verbandsliga Mecklenburg-Vorpommern until 2007 when a league championship took it up to the NOFV-Oberliga Nord. It finished fourth in the league in its first season there but then declined and was relegated again in 2010. Since then the club had been playing in the Verbandsliga again until the merger with FC Pommern in 2015.

== Honours ==
Historical chart of the club's league performance

- Verbandsliga Mecklenburg-Vorpommern (V)
  - Champions: 2007

== Former managers ==
- Andreas Zachhuber (2005)
- Jens Dowe (2005–2006)
- Andreas Zachhuber (2006–2009)
- Norbert Toller (2009–2013)

== Famous players ==
- Toni Kroos (1997–2002)
- Felix Kroos (1997–2002)
