= Bernhard Weis =

German footballer

Personal information
- Date of birth: 10 March 1976 (age 50)
- Place of birth: Freiburg, Germany
- Position: Striker

Team information
- Current team: SC Freiburg II (manager)

Senior career*
Years	Team	Apps	(Gls)
1994–1995	FC Vaduz		
1995–1997	FC Augsburg	45	(15)
1997–1999	Bayern Munich (A)	35	(5)
1999–2000	Waldhof Mannheim	3	(0)
2000–2002	Eintracht Trier	40	(6)
Total		123	(26)

Managerial career
- 2010: Eintracht Trier (U19)
- 2010–2011: Eintracht Trier II
- 2012–2013: SC Freiburg (U17 assistant)
- 2013–2017: SC Freiburg (U19 assistant)
- 2017–2021: SC Freiburg (youth)
- 2021–2023: SC Freiburg (U17)
- 2023–2024: SC Freiburg (U19)
- 2025–: SC Freiburg II
- * Club domestic league appearances and goals

Bernhard Weis (born 10 March 1976) is a German professional football coach and a former striker who is the manager of SC Freiburg II.
