= René Müller =

German footballer (born 1959)

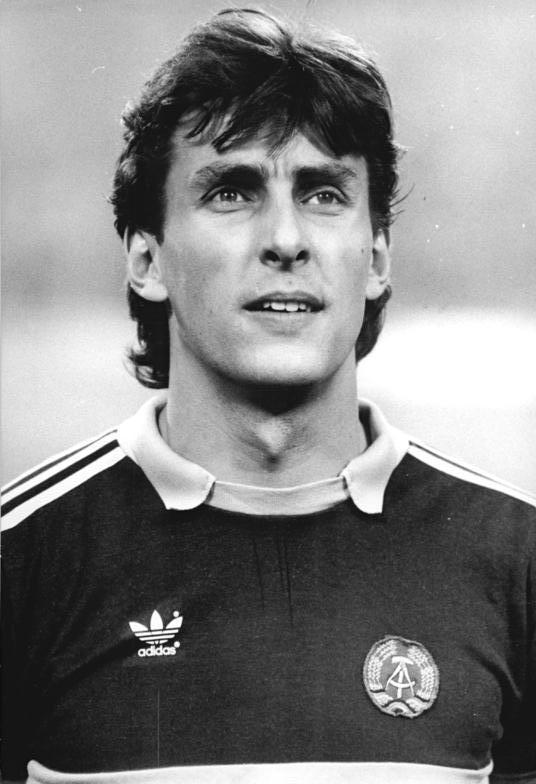
- Müller in 1986

Personal information
- Birth name: René Müller
- Date of birth: 11 February 1959 (age 67)
- Place of birth: Leipzig, East Germany
- Height: 1.80 m (5 ft 11 in)
- Position: Goalkeeper

Youth career
- 1965–1970: BSG Aktivist Markkleeberg (de)
- 1970–1976: 1. FC Lokomotive Leipzig

Senior career*
Years	Team	Apps	(Gls)
1976–1990	1. FC Lokomotive Leipzig	264	(0)
1990–1991	FC Sachsen Leipzig	26	(0)
1991–1994	1. FC Dynamo Dresden	81	(0)
1994–1995	FC St. Pauli	5	(0)
Total		376	(0)

International career
1979–1983	East Germany U21	14	(0)
1982–1984	East Germany Olympic	16	(0)
1984–1989	East Germany	46	(0)

Managerial career
- 1996–1999: VfB Leipzig (goalkeeping coach) (de)
- 1999–2000: Eintracht Frankfurt (goalkeeping/reserve coach)
- 2000–2003: VFC Plauen
- 2003–2005: Rot-Weiß Erfurt
- 2005–2006: Hallescher FC
- 2007–2011: 1. FC Nürnberg II
- * Club domestic league appearances and goals

René Müller (born 11 February 1959) is a German football coach and former player who played as a goalkeeper.

== Career ==
Müller was first-choice goalkeeper of the East Germany national team for much of the 1980s, and was twice East German Footballer of the Year. He played for 1. FC Lokomotive Leipzig for fourteen years, and later had spells with FC Sachsen Leipzig, 1. FC Dynamo Dresden and FC St. Pauli.

After his retirement Müller became a coach. He managed 1. FC Nürnberg II from 2007 until 11 April 2011.

== Honours ==
- FDGB-Pokal: 1980–81, 1985–86, 1986–87
- European Cup Winners' Cup: runner-up 1986–87
