= Nico Hug =

German footballer

Personal information
- Date of birth: 29 October 2000 (age 26)
- Place of birth: Niedereschach, Germany
- Position: Left-back

Team information
- Current team: SC Freiburg II
- Number: 20

Youth career
- –2021: SV Niedereschach
- 2011–2013: SV Zimmern
- 2013–2017: SC Freiburg

Senior career*
Years	Team	Apps	(Gls)
2017–2020	SC Freiburg II	37	(3)
2020–2022	FC Vaduz	34	(1)
2022–2024	Hallescher FC	61	(1)
2024–2025	VSG Altglienicke	25	(1)
2026	FC 08 Villingen	10	(0)
2026–	SC Freiburg II	6	(0)

International career
2015-2016	Germany U18	3	(0)
- * Club domestic league appearances and goals as of 24 September 2026

Nico Hug (born 26 October 1998) is a German professional footballer who plays as a left-back for SC Freiburg II.

== Career ==
Hug began his youth career in Germany with amateur clubs SV Niedereschach and SV Zimmern before moving to the youth academy of SC Freiburg in 2013. In 2017, Hug was promoted to the reserve squad, SC Freiburg II, which competed in the fourth-tier Regionalliga Südwest.

In the summer of 2020, Hug transferred to the Liechtensteinian capital club FC Vaduz. He made his debut in the Swiss Super League—the top flight of Swiss football—on 20 September 2020 (matchday 1) in a 2–2 draw against FC Basel, coming on for Joël Schmied in the 60th minute. FC Vaduz was relegated at the end of the 2020–21 season. In the subsequent 2021–22 Challenge League season (the second tier), the team finished in fourth place. Hug accumulated 54 league appearances for Vaduz over the two-year period. In May 2022, he also helped the team secure the Liechtensteiner Cup, marking the club's 22nd consecutive title victory in the competition.

In the summer of 2022, he returned to Germany, signing with 3. Liga club Hallescher FC on a two-year contract. He was brought in to cover the left flank following the departures of Janek Sternberg and Julian Guttau.

In August 2024, Hug joined VSG Altglienicke. He left again at the end of the season.
