= Jaaso Jantunen =

Finnish footballer (born 2005)

Personal information
- Full name: Jaaso Toivo Nikko Jantunen
- Date of birth: 31 January 2005 (age 21)
- Place of birth: Helsinki, Finland
- Height: 1.96 m (6 ft 5 in)
- Position: Goalkeeper

Team information
- Current team: Hansa Rostock (on loan from SC Freiburg II)
- Number: 31

Youth career
- –2022: HJK
- 2022–2023: SC Freiburg

Senior career*
Years	Team	Apps	(Gls)
2022	Klubi 04	1	(0)
2023–	SC Freiburg II	50	(0)
2026–	→ Hansa Rostock (loan)	0	(0)

International career^{‡}
2019	Finland U15	2	(0)
2021	Finland U17	1	(0)
2022–2023	Finland U18	4	(0)
2023	Finland U19	5	(0)
2025–	Finland U21	7	(0)
- * Club domestic league appearances and goals as of 30 August 2026 ‡ National team caps and goals as of 31 March 2026

Jaaso Toivo Nikko Jantunen (born 31 January 2005) is a Finnish professional footballer who plays as a goalkeeper for 3. Liga club Hansa Rostock on loan from SC Freiburg II.

== Club career ==
Jantunen is a product of HJK Helsinki youth academy. He made his senior debut with the club's reserve team Klubi 04 in third-tier Kakkonen in 2022.

On 13 May 2022, it was announced that Jantunen will transfer from HJK to SC Freiburg in the upcoming summer transfer window for an undisclosed fee.

Jantunen made his debut for SC Freiburg II in 3. Liga on 20 August 2023.

== International career ==
In October 2023, Jantunen was part of the Finland U19 squad in the 2024 UEFA European Under-19 Championship qualification tournament, where he played in three games against Romania, Czech Republic and San Marino.

== Career statistics ==
As of 23 June 2026

Appearances and goals by club, season and competition
Club	Season	League			National cup (Note: Includes Suomen Cup)		Continental		Other		Total	
Club	Season	Division	Apps	Goals	Apps	Goals	Apps	Goals	Apps	Goals	Apps	Goals
Klubi 04	2022	Kakkonen	1	0	1	0	—		—		2	0
SC Freiburg II	2022–23	3. Liga	0	0	0	0	—		—		0	0
SC Freiburg II	2023–24	3. Liga	6	0	0	0	—		—		6	0
SC Freiburg II	2024–25	Regionalliga Südwest	23	0	0	0	—		—		23	0
SC Freiburg II	2025–26	Regionalliga Südwest	18	0	0	0	—		—		18	0
SC Freiburg II	Total		47	0	0	0	0	0	0	0	37	0
Career total			48	0	1	0	0	0	0	0	49	0
