= Tim Sebastian (footballer) =

German footballer

Personal information
- Date of birth: 17 January 1984 (age 42)
- Place of birth: Leipzig, East Germany
- Height: 1.87 m (6 ft 2 in)
- Position: Defender

Youth career
- 1993–1996: FC Rot-Weiß Wolgast
- 1996–1999: Greifswalder SC
- 1999–2002: Hansa Rostock

Senior career*
Years	Team	Apps	(Gls)
2004–2008	Hansa Rostock	98	(3)
2008–2009	Karlsruher SC	19	(1)
2009–2010	Hansa Rostock	33	(4)
2010–2016	RB Leipzig	121	(4)
2016–2017	SC Paderborn	41	(2)

International career
2000	Germany U15	1	(0)
- * Club domestic league appearances and goals as of 31 July 2017

Tim Sebastian (born 17 January 1984) is a German former professional footballer who played as a defender. He has made various appearances for German youth national teams.

== Career ==
=== Hansa Rostock ===
Sebastian grew up playing in the Motor Wolgast youth system before joining Greifswalder SC in 1996. In 1999, he received an offer from FC Hansa Rostock and joined the club's youth system. On 7 November 2004, Sebastian made his debut in the Bundesliga, being named to the starting line-up by manager Juri Schlünz against VfB Stuttgart. He scored his first goal in the Bundesliga on 30 April 2005 in a 2–1 victory over Hertha BSC. In his first season with the first team he appeared in eight league games as Hansa was relegated to 2. Bundesliga at the end of the season.

Sebastian remained a key player at the club for the next few seasons and helped the club gain promotion back to the Bundesliga during the 2006–07 season. After featuring in 31 games in the top flight for Hansa during the 2007–08 season, Sebastian moved to Karlsruher SC on a free transfer. He remained at Karlsruhe for one season, appearing in 19 matches and scoring one goal, before returning the following season to Rostock.

=== RB Leipzig ===
In 2010, Sebastian returned to his hometown, joining RB Leipzig on a four-year contract and being immediately appointed captain. On 6 August 2010, Sebastian made his debut for RB Leipzig in a 1–1 draw with Türkiyemspor Berlin. He appeared in 27 league matches in his first season scoring one goal as the club finished its first season in the Regionalliga in fourth place, thus missing out on promotion. However, under coach Tomas Oral, the club succeeded in winning the 2010–11 Saxony Cup after defeating Chemnitzer FC 1–0 in the final on 1 June 2011 in front of 13,958 spectators at the Red Bull Arena. By winning the 2010–11 Saxony cup, the club won its first title in club history. It also qualified to participate in the 2011–12 DFB-Pokal. For the following seasons he was a key contributor in helping the club gain promotion from Regionalliga Nordost all the way up to the 2. Bundesliga. He extended his contract at RB Leipzig on 4 April 2014 for another year until 2015, with a possibility for another year of extension.

=== SC Paderborn ===
He moved to SC Paderborn on 14 January 2016.
