= Enrico Kern =

German football coach and former player (born 1979)

Personal information
- Date of birth: 12 March 1979 (age 47)
- Place of birth: Schneeberg, East Germany
- Height: 1.88 m (6 ft 2 in)
- Position: Forward

Team information
- Current team: Erzgebirge Aue (manager)

Youth career
- 1989–1995: BSG Wismut Schneeberg
- 1995–1998: Erzgebirge Aue

Senior career*
Years	Team	Apps	(Gls)
1998	Erzgebirge Aue	4	(0)
1998–2000	Tennis Borussia Berlin	11	(0)
2000–2002	Werder Bremen II	25	(3)
2002–2003	Waldhof Mannheim	28	(6)
2003–2005	LASK	37	(15)
2005–2006	Jahn Regensburg	30	(19)
2006–2010	Hansa Rostock	132	(39)
2010–2013	Erzgebirge Aue	49	(9)
Total		316	(91)

International career
1999–2000	Germany U-21	11	(6)
2002	Germany B	1	(0)

Managerial career
- 2026–: Erzgebirge Aue
- * Club domestic league appearances and goals

Enrico Kern (born 12 March 1979) is a German football coach of Erzgebirge Aue and former player.

== Career ==
Born in Schneeberg, Kern began his football career as a youth player with FC Erzgebirge Aue before moving to Tennis Borussia Berlin for DM1 million in the summer of 1998. He then moved between many clubs including; LASK in Austria and SSV Jahn Regensburg before moving to Rostock in 2006. After Rostock was relegated in 2010, he transferred back to FC Erzgebirge Aue.
