= Jürgen Heinsch =

German footballer (1940–2022)

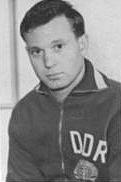
- Heinsch in 1964

Personal information
- Date of birth: 4 July 1940
- Place of birth: Lübeck, Germany
- Date of death: 13 July 2022 (aged 82)
- Height: 1.84 m (6 ft 0 in)
- Position: Goalkeeper

Youth career
- Hansa Rostock

Senior career*
| Years | Team | Apps | (Gls) |
- Hansa Rostock

International career
| 1963–1965 | East Germany | 7 | (0) |

Managerial career
- 1972–1978: Hansa Rostock (assistant)
- 1978–1979: Hansa Rostock
- 1979–1981: Hansa Rostock (assistant)
- 1981–1985: Hansa Rostock
- 1985–1986: TSG Bau Rostock
- 1993–1994: Hansa Rostock
Medal record
Men's football
Representing Germany
Olympic Games
| Bronze medal – third place | 1964 Tokyo | Team competition |
- * Club domestic league appearances and goals

Hans-Jürgen Heinsch (4 July 1940 – 13 July 2022) was a German footballer who competed in the 1964 Summer Olympics.
