= Axel Schulz (footballer) =

German footballer

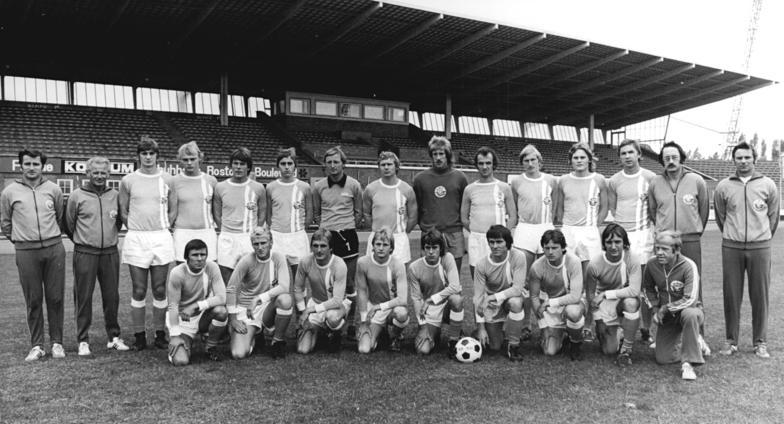
Axel Schulz (front row, fifth from left) with FC Hansa Rostock in 1978

Axel Schulz (20 May 1959) is a former German footballer.

== Club career ==
He played 250 matches in the East German and (unified) German top-flight for Hansa Rostock. He was part of the last East German champion and cup winner side in the 1990/91 season.

== International career ==
Schulz won three caps for the East Germany national team.

== Coaching career ==
He coached the women's team of Polizei SV Rostock.

== Career after pro times ==
Among other tasks he was also the spokesperson for FC Hansa after his career.
