= René Rydlewicz =

German footballer and manager

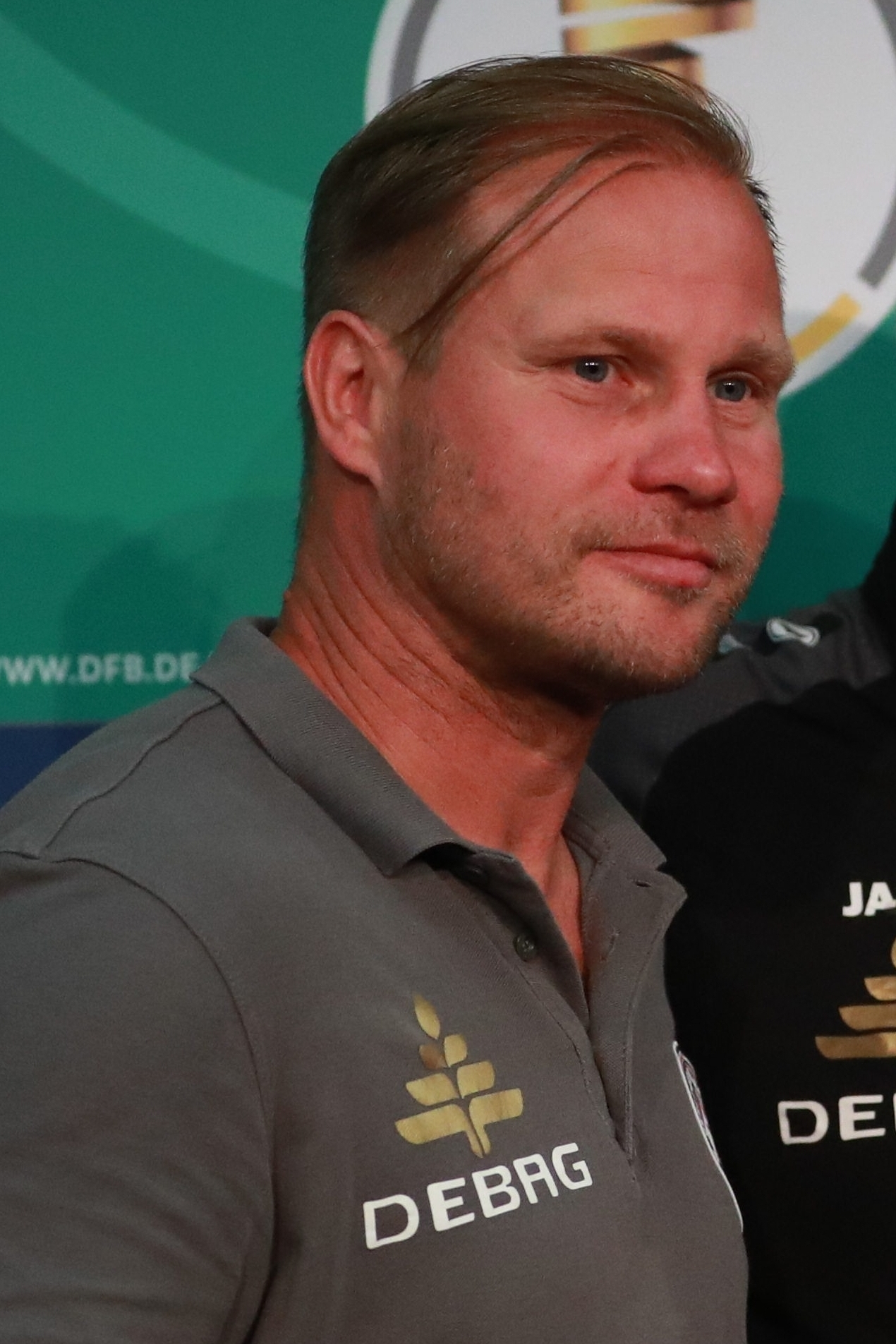
- Rydlewicz as manager of BFC Dynamo in 2018

Personal information
- Full name: René Rydlewicz
- Date of birth: 18 July 1973 (age 53)
- Place of birth: Forst (Lausitz), Bezirk Cottbus, East Germany
- Height: 1.75 m (5 ft 9 in)
- Position: Midfielder

Youth career
- 1977–1981: Chemie Döbern
- 1981–1985: Energie Cottbus
- 1985–1989: BFC Dynamo

Senior career*
Years	Team	Apps	(Gls)
1989–1990	BFC Dynamo	7	(1)
1990–1994	Bayer Leverkusen	15	(1)
1994–1996	TSV 1860 München	46	(2)
1996–1997	Bayer Leverkusen	28	(2)
1997–2000	Arminia Bielefeld	69	(5)
2000–2008	Hansa Rostock	199	(26)
2008–2009	FC Anker Wismar		

Managerial career
- 2009–2010: Hansa Rostock (general manager)
- 2010–2011: FSV Bentwisch U19
- 2011–2016: Energie Cottbus (youth)
- 2014: Energie Cottbus (caretaker)
- 2015: Energie Cottbus (caretaker)
- 2016–2018: BFC Dynamo
- * Club domestic league appearances and goals

René Rydlewicz (born 18 July 1973) is a German professional football manager and a former player who played as a midfielder.

== Playing career ==
Rydlewicz was born in Forst. He started his career as a youth team player for Chemie Döbern and went on to play with FC Energie Cottbus, Berliner FC Dynamo, and Bayer 04 Leverkusen in his later youth years. He signed his first professional contract at the age of 16 with BFC Dynamo and stayed with the club until 1990 when he signed for Bayer 04 Leverkusen. He stayed at Leverkusen for two years and made 15 appearances for the club. In the summer of 1994 he moved to TSV 1860 München played 28 games and two years later made the move back to Bayer 04 Leverkusen. In 1997, he was once again on the move, this time to Bundesliga club Arminia Bielefeld. He quickly established himself at the club and became the captain. He stayed with Bielefeld for three years and played 70 games for them before moving on to F.C. Hansa Rostock in the summer of 2000, where he played almost 200 games until 2008. He retired after playing one year for FC Anker Wismar.

== Managerial career ==
In July 2008, Rydlewicz joined FC Anker Wismar as a director of football. On 1 March 2009, he took over the job as general manager of Hansa Rostock. He was sacked in May 2010 due to lack of success.

He was interim manager for Energie Cottbus. He took over on 8 May 2014 and lost the sole match in–charge. He again took over on 20 September 2015, and again, lost the sole match in charge.

On 7 May 2016, he was named new manager of his former club BFC Dynamo. He was sacked in December 2018.

== Managerial record ==
As of 30 November 2015

Team	From	To	Record					
Team	From	To	G	W	D	L	Win %	Ref.
Energie Cottbus	8 May 2014	11 May 2014	1	0	0	1	0.00	
Energie Cottbus	20 September 2015	23 September 2015	1	0	0	1	0.00	
Total			2	0	0	2	0.00	—
