= Timo Lange =

German footballer and coach

Personal information
- Date of birth: 19 January 1968 (age 58)
- Place of birth: Grevesmühlen, East Germany
- Height: 1.80 m (5 ft 11 in)
- Position: Midfielder

Youth career
- Einheit Grevesmühlen
- TSG Wismar
- Stahl Brandenburg

Senior career*
Years	Team	Apps	(Gls)
1986–1991	Stahl Brandenburg	102	(12)
1991–1992	Hallescher FC	28	(3)
1992–2003	Hansa Rostock	275	(31)
2003–2004	Hansa Rostock II	35	(3)
Total		440	(49)

Managerial career
- 2004–2005: Hansa Rostock II
- 2005–2008: Hansa Rostock (assistant)
- 2009–2013: FC Anker Wismar
- * Club domestic league appearances and goals

Timo Lange (born 19 January 1968 in Grevesmühlen) is a German football coach and a former player.
