= Sławomir Chałaśkiewicz =

Polish footballer

Personal information
- Date of birth: 29 November 1963 (age 62)
- Place of birth: Łódź, Poland
- Height: 1.71 m (5 ft 7 in)
- Position: Midfielder

Senior career*
Years	Team	Apps	(Gls)
1981–1983	Metalowiec Łódź		
1983–1984	Boruta Zgierz		
1984–1985	Orzeł Łódź		
1985–1986	Start Łódź		
1986–1989	Widzew Łódź	66	(10)
1989–1991	Śląsk Wrocław	58	(12)
1991–1992	Widzew Łódź	33	(6)
1992–1997	Hansa Rostock	135	(17)
1998	Carl Zeiss Jena	15	(0)
1998	Widzew Łódź	3	(0)
1999	Start Łódź		
1999–2003	SV Babelsberg	122	(25)
2003–2005	Hessen Kassel	63	(28)
2005–2006	Zawisza Rzgów		
- * Club domestic league appearances and goals

Sławomir Chałaśkiewicz (born 29 November 1963) is a Polish former professional footballer who played as a midfielder. Besides Poland, he has played in Germany.
