= Carsten Sänger =

German footballer

- Sänger with the East Germany under-18 team in 1980

Personal information
- Date of birth: 8 November 1962 (age 64)
- Place of birth: Erfurt, East Germany
- Height: 1.82 m (5 ft 11 1/2 in)
- Position: Defender

Youth career
- 1971–1980: FC Rot-Weiß Erfurt

Senior career*
Years	Team	Apps	(Gls)
1980–1992	FC Rot-Weiß Erfurt	257	(4)
1992–1994	Hansa Rostock	73	(0)
1994–1995	Sachsen Leipzig	28	(1)
1995–1997	Carl Zeiss Jena	64	(1)
1997–1998	Sachsen Leipzig	17	(0)
1998–1999	Carl Zeiss Jena	28	(1)
1999	Rot-Weiß Erfurt	8	(0)
Total		475	(7)

International career
1984–1987	East Germany	16	(0)

Managerial career
- 1997: Sachsen Leipzig
- 2002–2004: FC Erfurt Nord
- 2009–2010: BW Dachwig-Döllstadt
- * Club domestic league appearances and goals

Carsten Sänger (born 8 November 1962) is a German former footballer.

== Club career ==
In the DDR-Oberliga the defender played only for FC Rot-Weiß Erfurt. After the German reunification Sänger was under contract for a couple of East German clubs but never played in the 1. Bundesliga. He had to end his career after his lower leg had to be amputated after a car accident.

== International career ==
Sänger won 16 caps for East Germany in the mid-1980s.
