= Frode Holstad Hansen =

Norwegian footballer (born 1961)

Frode Hansen
Personal information
- Full name: Frode Holstad Hansen
- Date of birth: 10 August 1961 (age 65)
- Place of birth: Fredrikstad, Norway
- Position: Goalkeeper

Youth career
- Gresvik

Senior career*
Years	Team	Apps	(Gls)
1978	Fredrikstad		
1978–1979	Gresvik		
1980–1983	Fredrikstad		
1984–1986	Start		
1987	Vigør		
1988–1991	Gresvik		
1992	Fredrikstad		

International career
1981–1983	Norway U21	5	(0)
1981–1982	Norway	3	(0)

Managerial career
- 1993: Fredrikstad
- * Club domestic league appearances and goals

Frode Holstad Hansen (born 10 August 1961) is a retired Norwegian football goalkeeper. During his career he played for Fredrikstad and Start in the top flight of Norwegian football. He also played for Gressvik and Vigør, and he was capped three times for Norway.

== Club career ==
He was born in Fredrikstad and played for Gressvik in his youth. In 1978 Hansen had a short spell at Fredrikstad FK and played a couple of matches for the first-team before he returned to Gressvik. Hansen returned to FFK in 1980, and became the first-choice goalkeeper at the age of 18. After making his break-through in 1981, he was invited on a trial to Manchester United. The club offered him a contract, but Hansen rejected the offer and returned to Fredrikstad.

After playing all the matches for Fredrikstad in 1982, Hansen had a dispute with the new head coach Tony Knapp, and did not play any matches in 1983, except 15 minutes in the last match of the season when he came on as a substitute to play outside left. The next season Hansen left for IK Start, and in the decisive match of the 1984-season, his club Start won 2–1 against his old club Fredrikstad which meant that FFK was relegated.

After three seasons in Start, Hansen stepped down from top flight football, and joined the fourth tier team Vigør. One year later he returned to his youth club, Gressvik, and became player-coach for the sixth tier team.

== International career ==
Hansen made his debut for Norway on 12 August 1981 against Nigeria, which also was the first time since 1972 that a Fredrikstad-player represented Norway. Hansen was capped three times total, after playing two more matches in 1982. He also played five matches for the under-21 team between 1981 and 1983.

== Coaching career ==
In 1992, Fredrikstad was relegated to the third tier for the first time in the history of the club. Per Egil Ahlsen and Frode Hansen was hired to get Fredrikstad promoted the next season, but the attempt was unsuccessful and they were replaced by Lars-Olof Mattsson. Later on Hansen had a short spell as head coach of Østsiden IL.
