= Marcel von Walsleben-Schied =

German footballer (born 1983)

Personal information
- Date of birth: 28 July 1983 (age 43)
- Place of birth: Weißenfels, East Germany
- Height: 1.72 m (5 ft 8 in)
- Position: Striker

Youth career
- Rot-Weiß Weißenfels
- –1998: Grün-Weiß Langendorf
- 1998–1999: Hansa Rostock
- 1999–2000: Halle 1896
- 2000–2001: Hansa Rostock

Senior career*
Years	Team	Apps	(Gls)
2001–2003	Hansa Rostock II	38	(25)
2001–2007	Hansa Rostock	59	(10)
2003–2004	→ VfL Osnabrück (loan)	33	(12)
2004–2005	→ SpVgg Unterhaching (loan)	34	(6)
2008	Carl Zeiss Jena	17	(5)
2008–2009	Eintracht Braunschweig	31	(6)
2009–2012	Hansa Rostock	75	(15)
2012–2014	Holstein Kiel	64	(22)
2014–2016	TSG Neustrelitz	48	(5)
2016–2020	TuS Dassendorf	113	(72)
2020	SV Curslack-Neuengamme	4	(0)
2021	Hagenower SV		
2022–2023	MSV Pampow	39	(12)

International career
2004	Germany U21	7	(0)
- * Club domestic league appearances and goals as of 1 July 2023

Marcel Schied, after his marriage Marcel von Walsleben-Schied, (born 28 July 1983) is a German professional footballer who most recently played as a striker for NOFV-Oberliga Nord club MSV Pampow.

== Career ==
Von Walsleben-Schied was born in Weißenfels. He spent three seasons in the Bundesliga with Hansa Rostock and returned to the club for a second spell from 1 July 2009 to 30 June 2019.

In 2016 he joined Hamburg-based club TuS Dassendorf in the fifth tier.

In December 2020 he announced his retirement from playing, having made four appearances for SV Curslack-Neuengamme. He unretired and started playing again in the 2021–22 season.
