= Heiko März =

German footballer

- Heiko März with FC Hansa Rostock in 1989

Personal information
- Date of birth: 9 July 1965 (age 61)
- Place of birth: Rostock, East Germany
- Height: 1.85 m (6 ft 1 in)
- Positions: Defender; midfielder

Youth career
- –1977: SG Fischkombinat Rostock
- 1977–1983: Hansa Rostock

Senior career*
Years	Team	Apps	(Gls)
1983–1998	Hansa Rostock	344	(27)
1998–1999	Hansa Rostock II	6	(0)
1999–2001	SV Babelsberg 03	48	(5)
2001–2003	FC Schönberg 95		

International career
1987–1988	East Germany Olympic	6	(1)
1989	East Germany	1	(0)
- * Club domestic league appearances and goals

Heiko März (born 9 July 1965) is a German former professional footballer who played as a defender or midfielder.

He played over 210 top-flight matches in East and unified Germany.

In 1989 he won one cap for the East Germany national team.

At the beginning of May 2022, March's commitment as a coach at the association football league team SV Warnemünde for the upcoming 2022/23-game series was announced. He replaced the previous coach Eckerhard Pasch.
