= Andreas Zachhuber =

German footballer and manager

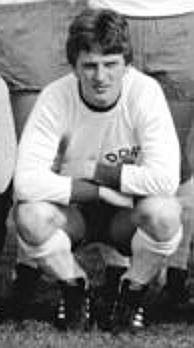
- Zachhuber in 1980

Personal information
- Date of birth: 29 May 1962 (age 64)
- Place of birth: Wismar, East Germany
- Position: Forward

Youth career
- –1975: TSG Wismar
- 1975–1980: Hansa Rostock

Senior career*
Years	Team	Apps	(Gls)
1980–1986	Hansa Rostock	67	(6)
1986–	BSG KKW Greifswald		
–1991	Dynamo Rostock		

Managerial career
- 1991–1992: Hansa Rostock (youth team)
- 1992–1994: Mecklenburg-Vorpommern (state coach)
- 1994–1999: Hansa Rostock (assistant)
- 1999–2000: Hansa Rostock
- 2001–2002: Hansa Rostock (youth team)
- 2002–2003: Hansa Rostock II
- 2005: Greifswalder SV 04
- 2005–2006: MSV Duisburg (assistant)
- 2006–2009: Greifswalder SV
- 2009–2010: Hansa Rostock
- * Club domestic league appearances and goals

Andreas Zachhuber (born 29 May 1962 in Wismar, East Germany) is a German football manager and former player. He last managed Hansa Rostock.
