= SC Freiburg II =

German football club

- Full name: Sport-Club Freiburg e.V.
- Founded: 30 May 1904; 122 years ago (club)
- Ground: Dreisamstadion
- Capacity: 24,000
- Manager: Bernhard Weis
- League: Regionalliga Südwest (IV)
- 2025–26: Regionalliga Südwest, 11th of 18
- Website: https://www.scfreiburg.com
Home colours	Away colours	Third colours

SC Freiburg II is the reserve team of German association football club SC Freiburg, based in Freiburg, Baden-Württemberg. The team played as SC Freiburg Amateure until 2005.

The team has reached the first round of the DFB-Pokal, the German Cup, once, in 2001–02. They were promoted to the 3. Liga for the first time in 2021, after winning the Regionalliga Südwest.

== History ==
The club's reserve team for the most part of its history played in the lower amateur leagues. It made a three-season appearance in the tier four Verbandsliga Südbaden from 1983 to 1986, with a third place in 1985 as its best result, but then took until 1994 to return to this league. In 1998 the team won promotion to the Oberliga Baden-Württemberg after a league championship in the Verbandsliga.

SC Freiburg II spent the next ten seasons at this level as an upper table side, never finishing outside the top seven, before another league championship in 1998 took the team to the Regionalliga Süd. After four seasons at this league the team became part of the new Regionalliga Südwest in 2012. After a seventh place in its first season in the league the team finished runner-up in 2013–14 but declined the right to take part in the promotion round to the 3. Liga and instead remained in the Regionalliga. At the end of the 2015–16 season Freiburg was relegated back to the Oberliga.

A South Baden Cup win in 2001 qualified it for the first round of the 2001–02 DFB-Pokal, the German Cup, where it lost to FC Schalke 04.

After a 1–1 draw vs. SV Elversberg on 5 June 2021, SC Freiburg II confirmed their promotion to the 2021–22 3. Liga.

== Honours ==
- 3. Liga
  - Runners-up: 2023
- Regionalliga Südwest
  - Winners: 2021
  - Runners-up: 2014
- Oberliga Baden-Württemberg
  - Winners: 2008, 2017
- Verbandsliga Südbaden
  - Winners: 1998
  - Runners-up: 1996
- South Baden Cup
  - Winners: 2001
  - Runners-up: 2005

== Recent seasons ==
The recent season-by-season performance of the club:

Season	Division	Tier	Position
1999–2000	Oberliga Baden-Württemberg	IV	6th
2000–01	Oberliga Baden-Württemberg	IV	6th
2001–02	Oberliga Baden-Württemberg	IV	7th
2002–03	Oberliga Baden-Württemberg	IV	3rd
2003–04	Oberliga Baden-Württemberg	IV	5th
2004–05	Oberliga Baden-Württemberg	IV	4th
2005–06	Oberliga Baden-Württemberg	IV	4th
2006–07	Oberliga Baden-Württemberg	IV	7th
2007–08	Oberliga Baden-Württemberg	IV	1st↑
2008–09	Regionalliga Süd	IV	14th
2009–10	Regionalliga Süd	IV	3rd
2010–11	Regionalliga Süd	IV	7th
2011–12	Regionalliga Süd	IV	8th
2012–13	Regionalliga Südwest	IV	7th
2013–14	Regionalliga Südwest	IV	2nd
2014–15	Regionalliga Südwest	IV	7th
2015–16	Regionalliga Südwest	IV	14th ↓
2016–17	Oberliga Baden-Württemberg	V	1st ↑
2017–18	Regionalliga Südwest	IV	4th
2018–19	Regionalliga Südwest	IV	7th
2019–20	Regionalliga Südwest	IV	13th
2020–21	Regionalliga Südwest	IV	1st ↑
2021–22	3. Liga	III	11th
2022–23	3. Liga	III	2nd
2023–24	3. Liga	III	20th ↓
2024–25	Regionalliga Südwest	IV	7th
2025–26	Regionalliga Südwest	IV	11th

- With the introduction of the Regionalligas in 1994 and the 3. Liga in 2008 as the new third tier, below the 2. Bundesliga, all leagues below dropped one tier. In 2012, the number of Regionalligas was increased from three to five with all Regionalliga Süd clubs except the Bavarian ones entering the new Regionalliga Südwest.

=== Key ===
↑ Promoted	↓ Relegated

== Players ==
=== Current squad ===
As of 8 September 2026

Note: Flags indicate national team as defined under FIFA eligibility rules; some limited exceptions apply. Players may hold more than one non-FIFA nationality.

No.	Pos.	Nation	Player
1	GK	GER	Kilian Katz
2	DF	GER	Leon Koß
4	DF	GER	Marius Klein
5	MF	GER	Fabian Rüdlin
6	MF	AUT	Tammo Schiertz
7	FW	GER	Krish Raweri
8	FW	GER	Julius Düker
9	FW	GER	Leon Čatak
11	FW	GER	Mateo Zelić
12	DF	AUT	Emilio Schiertz
13	DF	ENG	Daniel Williams
14	FW	USA	Jack James
15	MF	ENG	Billal Mohamed
17	MF	AUT	Elias Klaus
19	DF	GER	Elijah Oguguo

No.	Pos.	Nation	Player
20	DF	GER	Nico Hug
21	MF	SUI	Mladen Mijajlovic
22	MF	GER	Mika Reifsteck
26	MF	FIN	Oscar Wiklöf
27	MF	GER	Nicolas Höfler
29	DF	GER	Paulo Fritschi
30	MF	SUI	Rouven Tarnutzer
31	FW	FRA	Essad Ouhssakou
33	MF	FRA	Bismark Adomah
34	DF	CAN	Kilian Michelbach
38	GK	GER	Josip Barjasic
40	GK	SUI	Théodore Pizarro
48	MF	GER	Jannik Veit
49	FW	FRA	Chrisdy Dianzenza

=== Out on loan ===
Note: Flags indicate national team as defined under FIFA eligibility rules; some limited exceptions apply. Players may hold more than one non-FIFA nationality.

No. / Pos. / Nation / Player; 1 / GK / FIN / Jaaso Jantunen (at Hansa Rostock until 30 June 2027)	No. / Pos. / Nation / Player
