= KWO Berlin =

German football club

BSG KWO Berlin
- Full name: Betriebssportgemeinschaft Kabelwerk Oberspree Berlin
- Founded: 1949
- Dissolved: 1990
- Ground: KWO-Sportanlage an der Wuhlheide
- Capacity: 5,000
Home colours	Away colours

KWO Berlin was a German association football club from the city of Berlin. The club was active in the separate East German football competition that emerged in the Soviet-occupied eastern half of the country after World War II. It was established in 1949 as the factory club, or Betriebssportgemeinschaft, for VEB Kabelwerk Oberspree, a major state-owned industrial firm specializing in the manufacture of electrical cable and wire.

== History ==
In 1951, the club was renamed BSG Motor Oberspree Berlin and on 1 September 1957 joined TSC Obenchöneweide to play briefly as TSC Obenchöneweide/Oberspree before disappearing within TSC in December of that year, and playing as TSC Obenchöneweide III until 1959.

A separate KWO side was re-established in 1975 with the ambitious support and significant financial resources of the factory. By 1979, the team had risen out of lower level Kreisklasse competition into the Bezirksliga Berlin (III). They captured the city championship by a narrow margin over BSG EAB Lichtenberg 47 and advanced to play in the DDR-Liga (II). In their second season there KWO finished behind 1. FC Union Berlin before fading over the next two years and slipping back into Bezirksliga competition in 1983.

Manager Dieter Fietz had a friendly relationship Soviet forces stationed in the area and was able to augment his club with experienced Russian players. While this helped KWO in capturing a string of Berlin-Pokal (East Berlin Cups) and FDGB-Pokal (East German Cup) district titles in the late 1980s, the team was unable to immediately win its way back to second division play. The club finally won promotion in 1988 just before German reunification in 1990 for two seasons.

Between 1981 and 1990, KWO made frequent appearances in FDGB-Pokal (East German Cup) play where they typically were put out in the opening two rounds. Their furthest advance was in 1982 when they contested an eighth-final match Dynamo Dresden which they lost 0–2.

The club disappeared with German reunification in 1990, its women's football team becoming part of 1. FC Union Berlin.

== Honours ==
- East Berlin Cup champions: 1979, 1985, 1986, 1987, 1988
- FDGB district champions (East Berlin): 1986, 1987

== Stadium ==
The team played its home fixtures in the KWO-Sportanlage an der Wuhlheide, which also served other sports departments of the larger club. The facility had a capacity of 5,000 and was demolished in 2001.
