= Peter Wibrån =

Swedish footballer

Personal information
- Date of birth: 23 September 1969 (age 57)
- Place of birth: Växjö, Sweden
- Height: 1.79 m (5 ft 10 in)
- Position: Midfielder

Youth career
- IFK Lammhult
- Vederslöv/Dänningelanda IF

Senior career*
Years	Team	Apps	(Gls)
1987–1988	Vederslöv/Dänningelanda IF	40	(9)
1989–1995	Östers IF	163	(33)
1996–1998	Helsingborgs IF	77	(21)
1998–2003	Hansa Rostock	137	(15)
2003–2006	Östers IF	98	(9)
- Räppe GoIF

International career
1984–1985	Sweden U17	18	(1)
1986	Sweden U19	1	(0)
1989–1990	Sweden U21	7	(0)
1995–1996	Sweden B	2	(0)
1995–1997	Sweden	10	(0)
- * Club domestic league appearances and goals

Peter Wibrån (born 23 September 1969) is a Swedish former professional footballer who played as a midfielder.

Wibrån grew up in Lammhult near Växjö and began his professional career at Öster. In 1996, he signed for Helsingborgs IF, a club where he spent three successful years before moving to German Bundesliga club FC Hansa Rostock. In 2003, Wibrån decided to return to Sweden and Öster.

He won ten caps for the Sweden national team between 1995 and 1997.

After ending his professional career, he featured for amateur team Räppe GoIF in the late 2000s. He was later a sports journalist in Smålandsposten.
