= Juri Schlünz =

German footballer and coach

- Schlünz with Hansa Rostock in 1990

Personal information
- Date of birth: 27 July 1961 (age 65)
- Place of birth: East Berlin, East Germany
- Height: 1.82 m (6 ft 0 in)
- Position: Midfielder

Team information
- Current team: Hansa Rostock (youth teams coordinator)

Youth career
- 1968–1979: Hansa Rostock

Senior career*
Years	Team	Apps	(Gls)
1979–1994	Hansa Rostock	356	(77)
1994–1996	Parchimer FC		

Managerial career
- 1997–2000: Hansa Rostock (assistant)
- 2000: Hansa Rostock (caretaker)
- 2000–2001: Hansa Rostock (assistant)
- 2001–2002: Hansa Rostock (caretaker)
- 2002–2003: Hansa Rostock (assistant)
- 2003–2004: Hansa Rostock
- 2005–present: Hansa Rostock (youth teams coordinator)
- 2008: Hansa Rostock (caretaker)
- * Club domestic league appearances and goals

Juri Schlünz (born 27 July 1961 in East Berlin, East Germany) is a German football coach and former player. As of 2009, he is the youth teams coordinator with Hansa Rostock.

== Honours ==
- East Germany champion: 1991
- East German Cup winner: 1991
