= FC Hansa Rostock =

German football club

Hansa Rostock
- Full name: Fußballclub Hansa Rostock e. V.
- Nicknames: Hansa, Hanseaten, Kogge, Hansa-Kogge, Ostseestädter
- Founded: 28 December 1965; 60 years ago
- Ground: Ostseestadion, Rostock
- Capacity: 29,000
- Chairman: Robert Marien
- Manager: André Breitenreiter
- League: 3. Liga
- 2025–26: 3. Liga, 5th of 20
- Website: www.fc-hansa.de
Home colours	Away colours	Third colours

FC Hansa Rostock (German: [ʔɛf ˈt͡seː ˈhanza ˈʁɔstɔk]) is a German association football club based in the city of Rostock, Mecklenburg-Western Pomerania. The club is also known as "the cog", because of its club crest. Rostock emerged as one of the most successful clubs from the former East Germany after German reunification and has made several appearances in the top-flight Bundesliga. With over 31,000 club members, the club is one of the largest sports clubs in Germany.

After being in the Bundesliga for ten years from 1995 to 2005, Rostock went into a steady decline. In 2012, the club was relegated to the 3. Liga for the second time, regaining its place in the 2. Bundesliga in 2021. They returned to the 3. Liga after three seasons following relegation in 2023–24.

== History ==
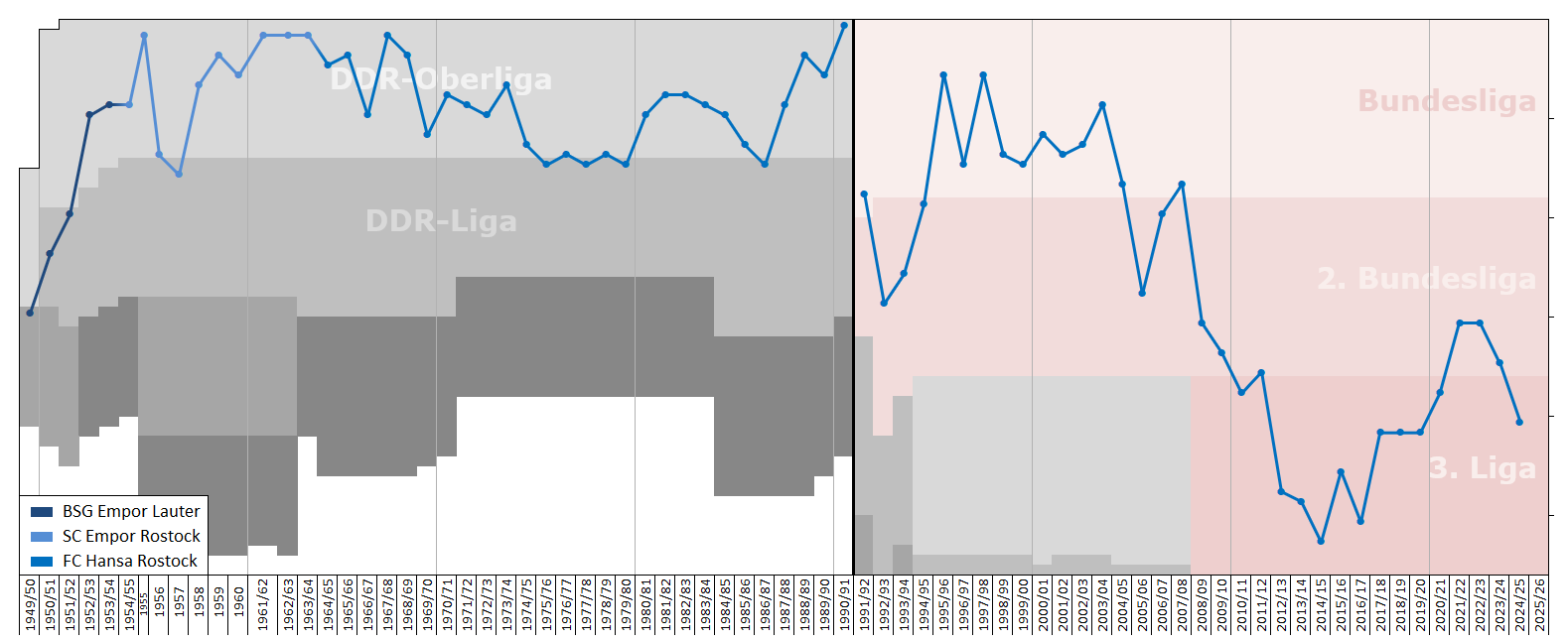
Historical chart of Hansa's league performances.

The club was originally founded on 1 November 1954 as the multi-sport sports club SC Empor Rostock. The football squad, however, could not be recruited from local enterprise sports communities (German: Betriebssportgemeinschaft, BSG) like the squad of the handball section, so a transfer of BSG Empor Lauter's squad from Lauter to Rostock was considered. The area around Lauter, near the Czech border, was well represented in East German football by competitive sides, including Wismut Aue, Fortschritt Meerane and Motor Zwickau, so the footballers of BSG Empor Lauter were delegated to Rostock, over the futile protests of the team's local supporters. Then SED First Secretary in Bezirk Rostock Karl Mewis and SED functionary Harry Tisch were instrumental in the relocation of BSG Empor Lauter to Rostock. Karl Lewis was allegedly the initiator of the relocation. This was not an uncommon occurrence in the 1950s of East German football, where clubs were regularly renamed, re-structured, dismantled or shuffled from city to city at the direction of well-placed communist officials. The new club would be sponsored by the fishing combine VEB Fischkombinat Rostock.

The wholesale transfer of the Lauterers to Rostock part way through the 1954–55 season led to the disappearance of that association from play. A new club was formed in 1956 as BSG Motor Lauter and on 1 August 1990, it took up the tradition of the original side to play as Lauterer Sportverein Viktoria 1913.

=== Play in Rostock ===
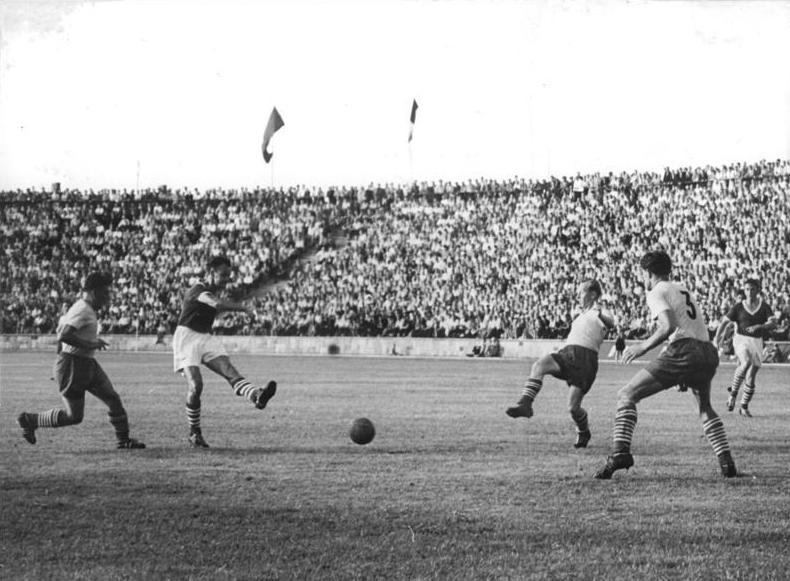
A match between SC Empor Rostock and SC Dynamo Berlin at the Ostseestadion in 1957.

The newly formed SC Empor Rostock took the place of the former Lauter-based club in first division play in November 1954. They finished second the next season, but in 1956 plunged to 14th place and were relegated. They quickly bounced back, rejoining the DDR-Oberliga in 1958, before going on to become a very competitive side with a series of three vice-championships to their credit from 1962 to 1964, as well as several appearances in the final of the FDGB Pokal. The re-organization of East German sports in 1965 led to the association's football department becoming independent as Fußball Club Hansa Rostock, which was designated as one of the country's 10 dedicated football club intended to groom talent for the development of a strong East Germany national team. The new club's name acknowledged Rostock's history as one of the major trading centres of northern Europe's Hanseatic League. FC Hansa Rostock would be sponsored by the maritime combine VEB Kombinat Seeverkehr und Hafenwirtschaft. And the club would be patronaged by the SED First Secretary of Bezirk Rostock, as well as future Free German Trade Union Federation chairman and Politburo member Harry Tisch.

By the 1970s, the club was consistently finishing in the lower half of the league table and was relegated to the second division DDR-Liga for a single season on three occasions late in the decade. They returned to form in the 1980s, and, as the football leagues of West Germany and East Germany were merged in 1990 after the re-unification of the country, Rostock won its first national championship in the final season of East German football, played out in the transitional NOFV-Oberliga. This is their only top flight title to date in play in East Germany or the unified Germany.

They also captured the last East German Cup with a 1–0 win over FC Stahl Eisenhüttenstadt.

=== United Germany and the Bundesliga ===
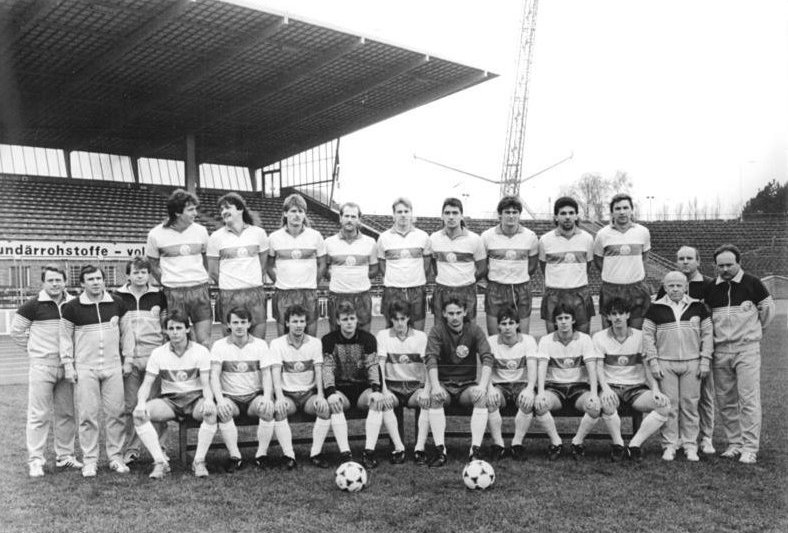
The January 1990 squad

The club's success in the Oberliga earned them a place in the Bundesliga alongside Dynamo Dresden when the top-flight Bundesliga was briefly expanded from 18 to 20 teams for the 1991–92 season to accommodate two former East German teams. Hansa, however, was unable to stay up and was relegated after falling just a single point shy of SG Wattenscheid 09. Three seasons of tempering in the 2. Bundesliga would return the club to the top flight for the 1995–96 season. In ten years spent in the Bundesliga, the team's best results were a pair of sixth-place finishes. In spite of frequent placings in the bottom-half of the league table, they would persist as the only former East German side able to consistently challenge the well-heeled clubs of the west. On 1 December 2002, Rostock became the first club to field six foreigners from the same country in a Bundesliga match (Rade Prica, Marcus Lantz, Peter Wibrån, Andreas Jakobsson, Magnus Arvidsson and Joakim Persson – all Swedes).

In the first half of the 2004–05 season, Hansa earned only 1 win and 5 draws in 17 matches. They were unable to recover despite the late arrival of Finnish striker Jari Litmanen and at season's end were relegated, leaving the former GDR without a club in the top flight for the first time since re-unification. Like other East German teams, they were the victims of a harsh economic reality as the wealthier, well-established western sides bought up the most talented eastern footballers as their clubs struggled to survive financially: Rostock's Stefan Beinlich, Oliver Neuville and Victor Agali were just three players sent west in exchange for cash. After two years in the 2. Bundesliga, the club returned to the top-flight for the 2007–08 season, but was again relegated.

The club's poor form continued in 2009–10 and they finished third-last. With this season, a new promotion/relegation format accompanied the introduction of the 3. Liga and Rostock faced a playoff versus the third place third division club FC Ingolstadt. Hansa lost both legs of the contest and was sent down to the 3. Liga, while Ingolstadt won promotion to the 2. Bundesliga alongside the top two third-tier teams which advanced automatically by virtue of their finishes. Their stay was a short one as they were sent back down after finishing bottom table in 2011–12.

Hansa Rostock drew an average home attendance of 11,433 in the 2016–17 3. Liga, the third-highest in the league.

== Club culture and supporters ==
A study published in 2007 by Sportfive reported Hansa's fanbase to be the seventh largest in Germany, involving up to two million supporters. According to another study published in 2008 by Allensbach Institute, Hansa is the most popular German football club in the New Länder and the most popular club of the former GDR in reunited Germany. Hansa Rostock's official anthem is "FC Hansa, wir lieben Dich total" ("Hansa FC, We Totally Love You"), recorded in 1995 by East German band Puhdys.

=== Issues with hooliganism and far-right links ===
==== 1990s ====
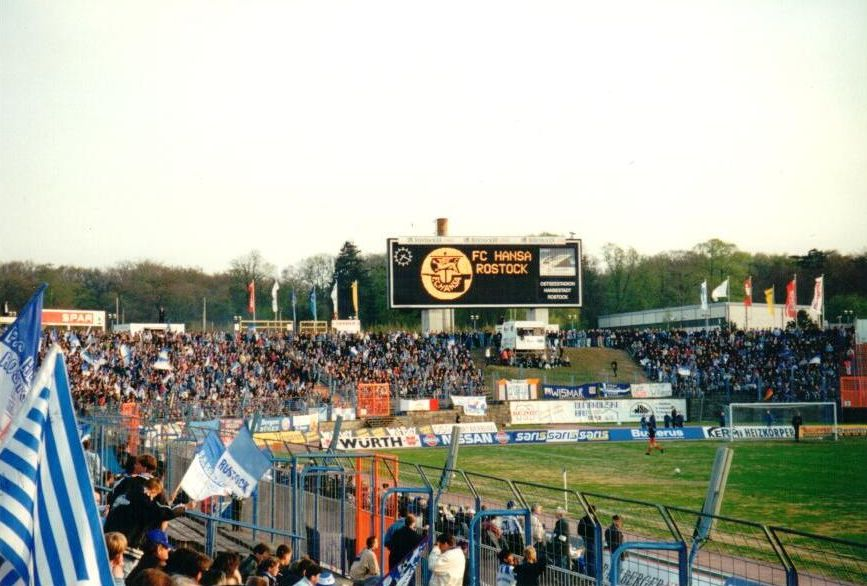
Hansa Rostock supporters in 1996

Hansa's support has, since German reunification, repeatedly been associated with elements of the far-right, a reputation with roots in the early 1990s. In August 1992, rioting broke out in the Lichtenhagen district of Rostock, where a crowd of neo-Nazis, joined by several hundred young people (some of whom, according to the Spanish newspaper El País, had attended Hansa's match against Eintracht Braunschweig earlier that day), besieged a hostel housing asylum seekers and former Vietnamese contract workers. In March 1993, around 400 Rostock neo-Nazis and hooligans attempted to storm the away section during a match between Rostock and St Pauli, an incident later dramatised in the 1994 ARD television film Schicksalsspiel.

In 1995 El País reported that skinhead and neo-Nazi groups had found a home among Hansa's supporters, with some giving straight-armed salutes or wearing clothing bearing images of Adolf Hitler, and that a flare thrown during a match against FC St. Pauli had forced the game to be suspended. Writing in Die Tageszeitung in 1996, journalist Rainer Schäfer described the enduring hostility between Hansa and St Pauli supporters as originating in this period, while noting that Rostock fan representatives rejected the "right-wing" characterisation, arguing that politics had no place in the stadium and that St Pauli supporters themselves attracted far-right agitators to matches.

==== 2000s and 2010s ====
According to NDR reporter Jan Didjurgeit, a decade of relative calm during Hansa's Bundesliga years in the 1990s and early 2000s ended in February 2006, when Rostock supporters vandalised the railway station in Stendal after an away match in Braunschweig was called off, an event he described as the "turning point" that ushered in the modern era of hooliganism associated with the club. On 1 May 2007, during a 2. Bundesliga match against Rot-Weiss Essen, Rostock fans set fires in the stands, resulting in 14 injuries and several arrests. The German Football Association (DFB) investigated and fined the club, citing serious crowd trouble. In August 2010, around 150 Hansa supporters, including members of the ultras group Suptras, prevented Udo Pastörs, then leader of the NPD faction in the Mecklenburg-Vorpommern state parliament, and around twenty other party members, from entering the Ostseestadion before a match against TuS Koblenz, chanting "Nazis raus" ("Nazis out"). The same evening, however, around 50 masked Hansa supporters attacked a St Pauli fan gathering in Hamburg, the report added.

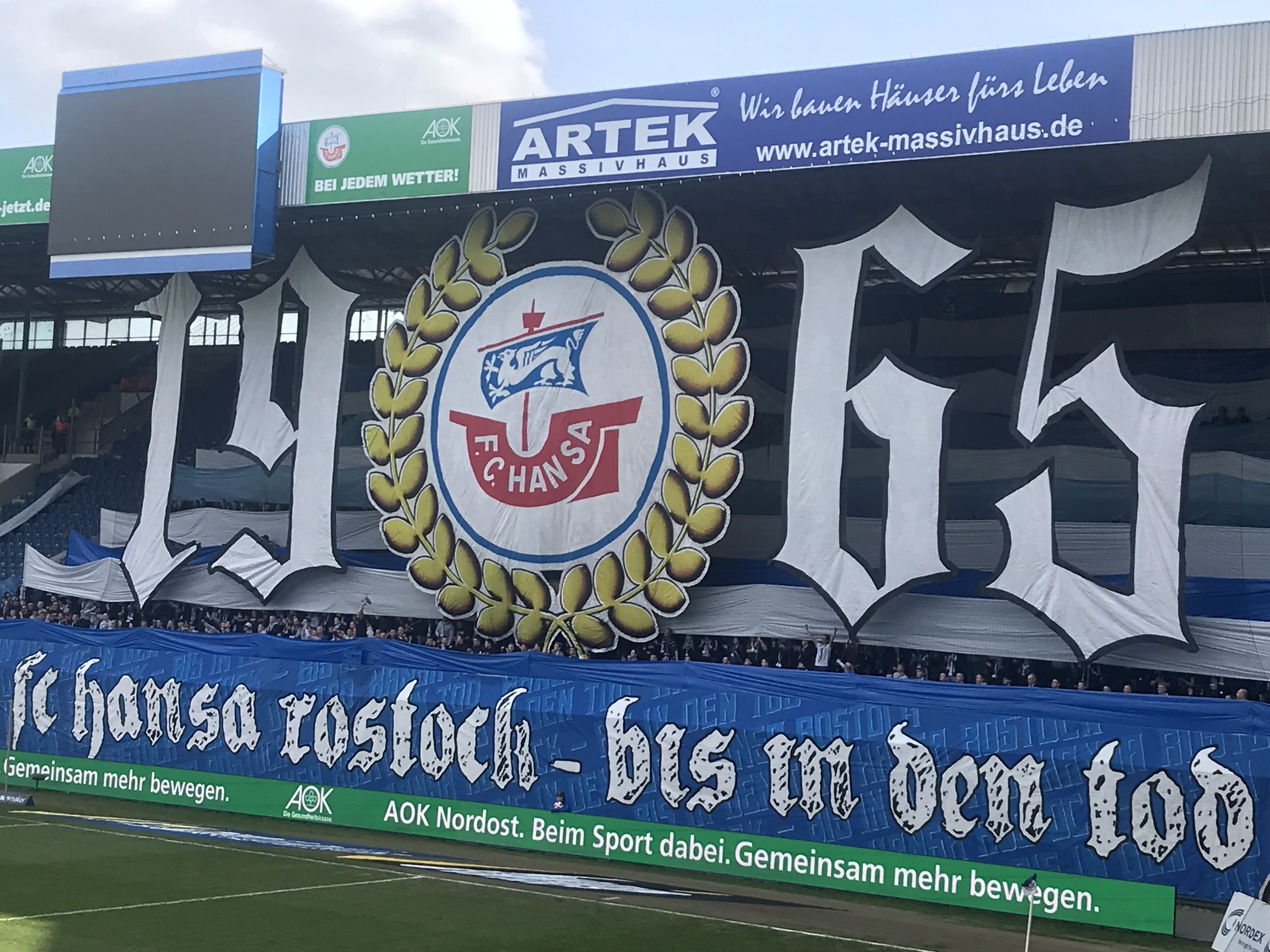
Hansa Rostock supporters in 2019

In 2017, Hansa fans gained attention for bringing dead fish to throw at FC Carl Zeiss Jena fans during a 3. Liga away match, an action investigated by the DFB and resulting in fines for both clubs. In August 2019, supporters unveiled a choreography before a DFB-Pokal tie against VfB Stuttgart featuring a banner in Fraktur script reading "Ausser Rand und Band, für Verein und Vaterland" ("Off the rails, for club and fatherland") alongside a German flag. The club said the display, organised by a fan club and cleared in advance with police, had raised no security concerns, though it expected a fine over pyrotechnics let off during the choreography.

==== 2020s ====
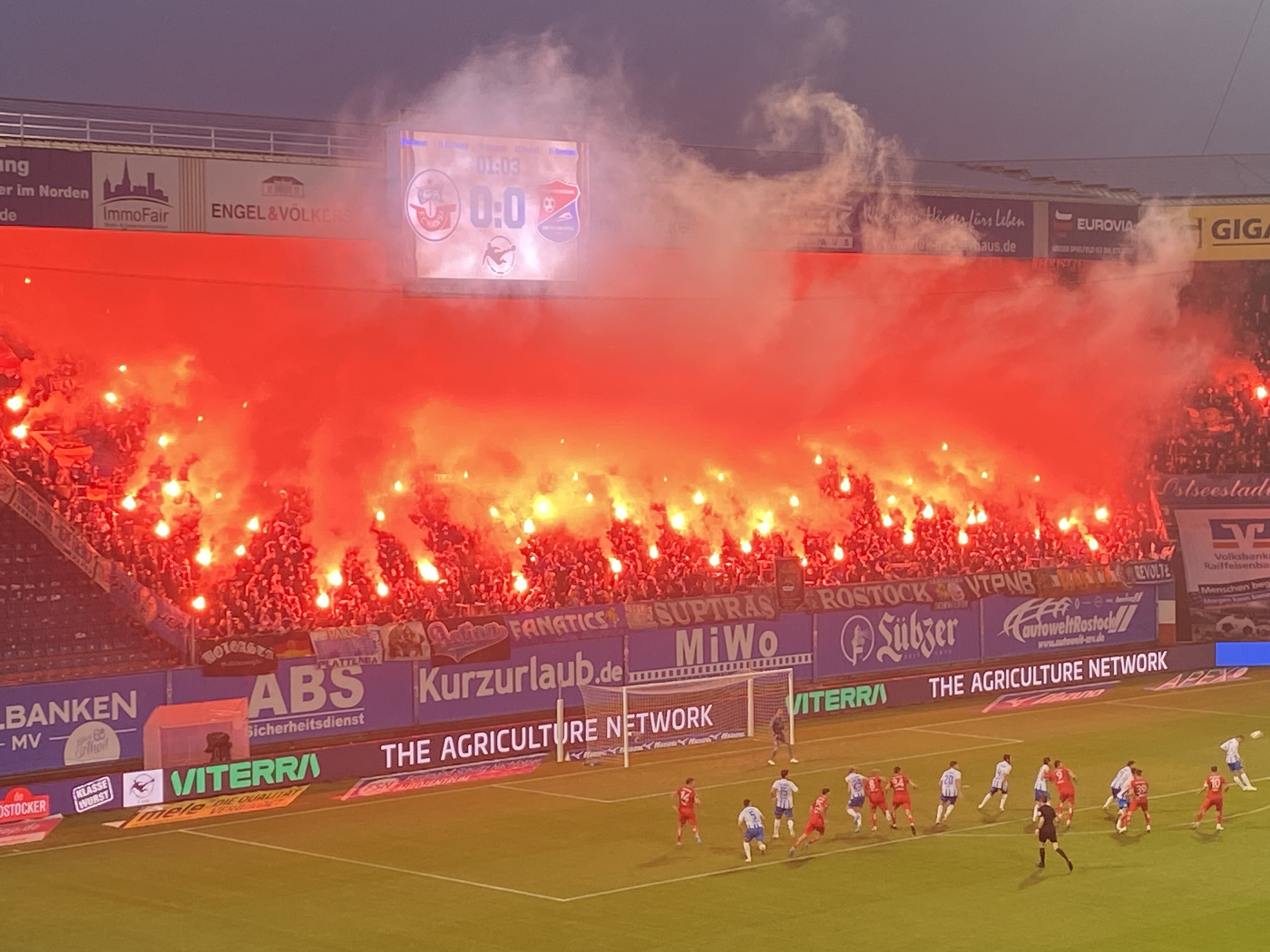
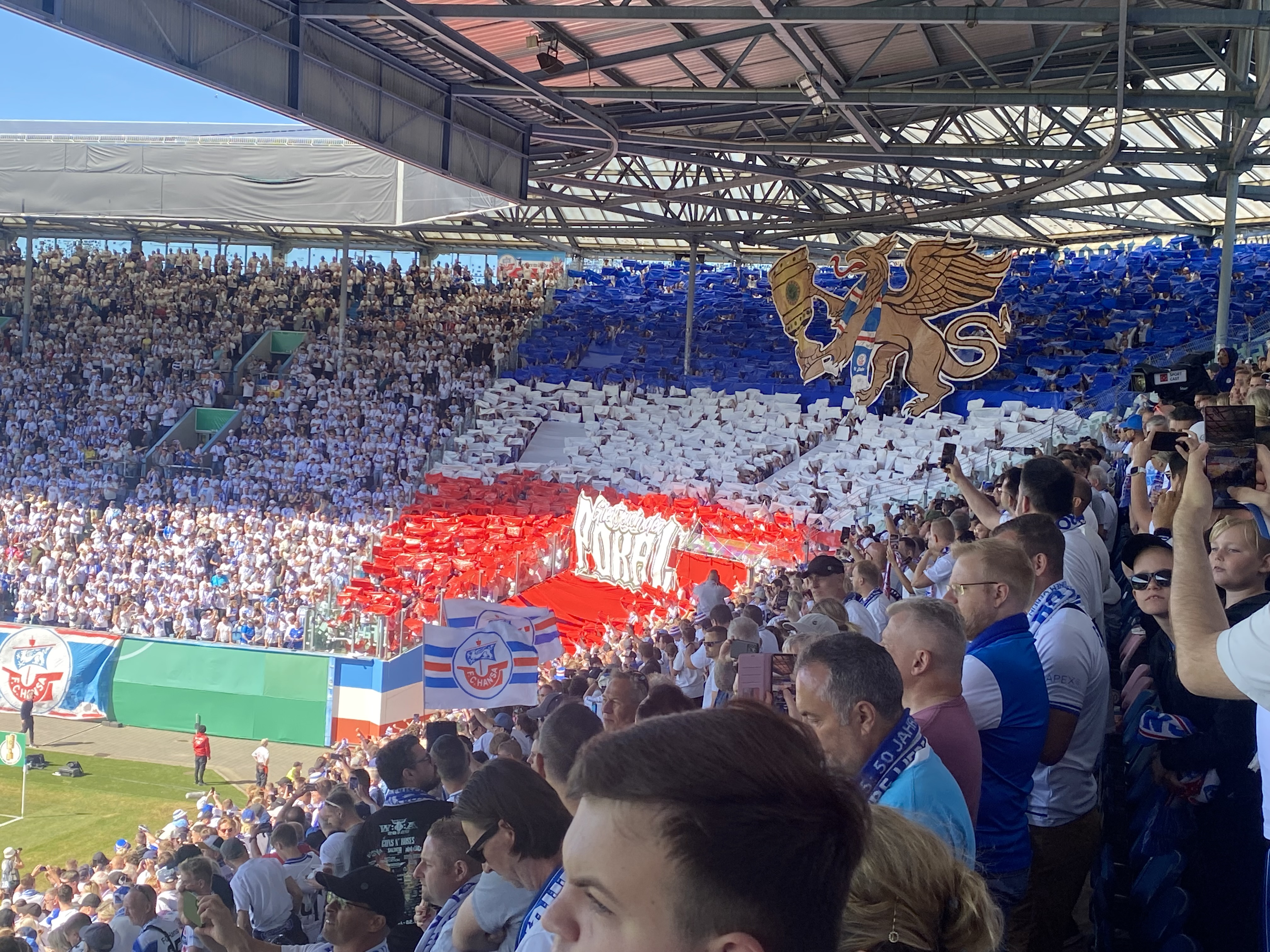
Supporters in the mid-2020s

In October 2021, Hansa supporters boycotted an away match at St Pauli in protest at COVID-19 entry restrictions; in the lead-up, banners depicting a pig's head and reading "Pauli-Schweine" ("Pauli pigs") were displayed on a motorway bridge and in Hamburg, prompting a police investigation, while police were separately pursuing a case over an earlier banner celebrating the death of a Hamburg police officer. In November 2021, around 150 Rostock supporters attacked police and stadium security after a game, throwing stones and pyrotechnics, injuring one officer and damaging a police vehicle. The club was fined €97,300 by the DFB for the incidents and the apparent celebration of a police officer's recent death.

During a Second Bundesliga match against St Pauli on 21 August 2022, one day before the 30th anniversary of the Lichtenhagen riots, Hansa supporters displayed homophobic and transphobic banners alongside one reading "Lichtenhagen" accompanied by a sunflower symbol, widely interpreted as a reference to the 1992 attack on the so-called Sonnenblumenhaus (Sunflower House), which had accommodated Vietnamese contract workers. The club distanced itself from the homophobic and racist content but said the Lichtenhagen banner belonged to a fan group from the district of the same name, had hung at matches for over a decade, and was not connected to the events of 1992. Die Tageszeitung columnist Johannes Kopp argued this response reflected financial calculation rather than a genuine lack of awareness, since acknowledging the banner's intent would have exposed the club to a heavier DFB fine.

In March 2023, club chairman Robert Marien acknowledged that the club could not be certain it was free of right-wing extremism among its support, after stickers bearing far-right slogans referencing the club and the wider Pomeranian region were found in the away section during a match at St Pauli.

On 23 February 2025, Hansa's 3. Liga match against Dynamo Dresden involved extensive pre-game tensions, fireworks, and clashes in the stands, resulting in dozens of injuries and police intervention, as well as property damage in and around the stadium; Hansa had previously been fined €5,000 in December 2024 over a banner with obscene and provocative language displayed during an earlier match against Dresden. In March 2025, after a 3. Liga away game against Alemannia Aachen, Hansa supporters caused destruction of seats and toilets, resulting in an estimated €50,000 in damages; the club responded by restricting away ticket sales to members only and placing fan behaviour under probationary conditions. Reflecting on the club's active support that same year, NDR reporter Jan Didjurgeit described a division between a broadly apolitical or left-leaning contingent on the Ostseestadion's Südtribüne and a smaller, more recently established ultra block in the ground's north-east corner associated with the political right, and estimated, in line with a figure given separately by the president of the regional higher regional court, Kai-Uwe Theede, that several hundred supporters were prepared to engage in violence. Political scientist Manès Weisskircher has similarly noted that Hansa Rostock, alongside Dynamo Dresden, is among the eastern German clubs that have "long struggled with far-right football fans" amid a broader pattern of economic and political divergence between eastern and western Germany since reunification.

== Performance chart ==
Season	Division	Tier	Position
1984–85	DDR-Oberliga	I	10th
1985–86	DDR-Oberliga	I	13th↓
1986–87	DDR-Liga	II	1st↑
1987–88	DDR-Oberliga	I	9th
1988–89	DDR-Oberliga	I	4th
1989–90	DDR-Oberliga	I	6th
1990–91	NOFV-Oberliga	I	1st
1991–92	Bundesliga	I	18th↓
1992–93	2. Bundesliga	Ii	11th
1993–94	2. Bundesliga	Ii	8th
1994–95	2. Bundesliga	Ii	1st↑
1995–96	Bundesliga	I	6th
1996–97	Bundesliga	I	15th
1997–98	Bundesliga	I	6th
1998–99	Bundesliga	I	14th
1999–2000	Bundesliga	I	15th
2000–01	Bundesliga	I	12th
2001–02	Bundesliga	I	14th
2002–03	Bundesliga	I	13th
2003–04	Bundesliga	I	9th
2004–05	Bundesliga	I	17th↓
2005–06	2. Bundesliga	II	10th
2006–07	2. Bundesliga	II	2nd↑
2007–08	Bundesliga	I	17th↓
2008–09	2. Bundesliga	II	13th
2009–10	2. Bundesliga	II	16th↓
2010–11	3. Liga	III	2nd↑
2011–12	2. Bundesliga	II	18th↓
2012–13	3. Liga	III	12th
2013–14	3. Liga	III	13th
2014–15	3. Liga	III	17th
2015–16	3. Liga	III	10th
2016–17	3. Liga	III	15th
2017–18	3. Liga	III	6th
2018–19	3. Liga	III	6th
2019–20	3. Liga	III	6th
2020–21	3. Liga	III	2nd↑
2021–22	2. Bundesliga	II	13th
2022–23	2. Bundesliga	II	13th
2023–24	2. Bundesliga	II	17th↓
2024–25	3. Liga	III	5th
2025–26	3. Liga	III	5th
2026–27	3. Liga	III	

== Honours ==
After German reunification, the last regular DDR-Oberliga season was played in NOFV-Oberliga. During 1990–91 NOFV-Oberliga season, Hansa Rostock became the last East Germany champion.

=== Domestic ===
- NOFV-Oberliga
  - Champions: 1990–91
- DDR-Oberliga
  - Runners-up: 1955, 1961–62, 1962–63, 1963–64, 1967–68
- FDGB-Pokal
  - Winners: 1990–91
  - Runners-up: 1955, 1957, 1960, 1966–67, 1986–87
- 2. Bundesliga
  - Champions: 1994–95
- 3. Liga
  - Runners-up: 2020–21

=== Regional ===
- Mecklenburg-Vorpommern Cup (Tiers 3–7)
  - Winners: 1998, 2005, 2006, 2011, 2015, 2016, 2017, 2018, 2019, 2020, 2025, 2026

=== Youth ===
- German Under 19 championship
  - Winner: 2010
  - Runners-up: 2013
- German Under 17 championship
  - Runners-up: 2005

=== Other ===
- German Indoor championship
  - Winners: 1998

=== Double ===
DDR-Oberliga and FDGB-Pokal:

- 1991

== Players ==
=== Current squad ===
As of 3 September 2026

Note: Flags indicate national team as defined under FIFA eligibility rules; some limited exceptions apply. Players may hold more than one non-FIFA nationality.

No.	Pos.	Nation	Player
1	GK	GER	Luca Unbehaun
3	DF	LUX	Florian Bohnert
4	MF	SLO	Kenan Fatkič
5	MF	GER	Marco Schuster
6	MF	GER	Jonas Dirkner
7	FW	GER	Bernie Lennemann
8	DF	GER	Ouassim Karada (on loan from Eintracht Frankfurt)
9	FW	GER	Andreas Voglsammer
10	MF	GER	Paul Stock
11	FW	DEN	Emil Holten
15	DF	GER	Ahmet Gürleyen
16	DF	AUT	Lukas Wallner
17	DF	GER	Florian Carstens
21	FW	GER	David Hummel
22	DF	GER	Leon Reichardt
23	DF	GER	Franz Pfanne (captain)

No.	Pos.	Nation	Player
25	GK	GER	Philipp Klewin
27	MF	POL	David Kopacz
29	FW	AUT	Peter Kiedl
30	GK	GER	Yannic Stein
31	GK	FIN	Jaaso Jantunen (on loan from SC Freiburg II)
32	DF	GER	Niklas Kölle
35	MF	GER	Maximilian Krauß
36	MF	GER	Fiete Bock
37	MF	POL	Miłosz Brzozowski
40	GK	GER	Erik Maurer
41	FW	GER	Yannick Michaelis
42	MF	GER	Benno Dietze
43	FW	GER	Leon Dajaku
45	FW	LAT	Felikss Sproģis
46	MF	GER	Robin Falk

=== Out on loan ===
Note: Flags indicate national team as defined under FIFA eligibility rules; some limited exceptions apply. Players may hold more than one non-FIFA nationality.

No.	Pos.	Nation	Player
—	DF	GER	Dario Gebuhr (at Eintracht Trier until 30 June 2027)
—	FW	GER	Tim Krohn (at 1. FC Bocholt until 30 June 2027)

== Coaching staff ==
As of 25 September 2026

Position	Name
Manager	(Germany) André Breitenreiter
Assistant manager	(Germany) Timo Struckmeier (Germany) Yannic Thiel (Croatia) Adam Sušac
Goalkeeper coach	(Germany) Arvid Rinast
Fitness coach	(Germany) Reinhard Schnittker (Germany) Daniel Rellmann

== Managers ==
- Oswald Pfau (1954–1955)
- Erich Dietel (1956)
- Lothar Wiesner (1956)
- Willi Möhring (1956)
- Kurt Zapf (1956)
- Heinz Krügel (1957–1958)
- Walter Fritzsch (1959–1965)
- Gerhard Gläser (1965–1969)
- Horst Saß (1969–1973)
- Heinz Werner (1973–1975)
- Helmut Hergesell (1975–1978)
- Jürgen Heinsch (1978–1979)
- Harry Nippert (1979–1981)
- Jürgen Heinsch (1981–1985)
- Claus Kreul (1985–1986)
- Werner Voigt (1986–1990)
- Uwe Reinders (1990–1992)
- Erich Rutemöller (1992)
- Jürgen Heinsch (1992–1993)
- Horst Hrubesch (1993)
- Frank Pagelsdorf (1994–1997)
- Ewald Lienen (1997–1999)
- Andreas Zachhuber (1999–2000)
- Juri Schlünz (2000)
- Friedhelm Funkel (2000–2001)
- Juri Schlünz (2001–2002)
- Armin Veh (2002–2003)
- Juri Schlünz (2003–2004)
- Jörg Berger (2004–2005)
- Frank Pagelsdorf (2005–2008)
- Juri Schlünz (2008)
- Dieter Eilts (2008–2009)
- Andreas Zachhuber (2009–2010)
- Thomas Finck (2010)
- Marco Kostmann (2010)
- Peter Vollmann (2010–2011)
- Wolfgang Wolf (2011–2012)
- Marc Fascher (2012–2013)
- Andreas Bergmann (2013–2014)
- Dirk Lottner (2014)
- Peter Vollmann (2014)
- Karsten Baumann (2014–2015)
- Christian Brand (2015–2017)
- Uwe Ehlers (2017)
- Pavel Dotchev (2017–2019)
- Jens Härtel (2019–2022)
- Patrick Glöckner (2022–2023)
- Alois Schwartz (2023)
- Uwe Speidel (2023–2024)
- Mersad Selimbegović (2024)
- Bernd Hollerbach (2024)
- Simon Pesch / Marcus Rabenhorst (2024)
- Daniel Brinkmann (2024–2026)
- Yannic Thiel / Adam Sušac (2026)
- André Breitenreiter (2026–)

== Stadium ==
The original Ostseestadion was built in 1954, with the participation of several hundred citizens of Rostock who helped for free. The first international match in the Ostseestadion of East Germany was on 26 September 1956. In 2001, the stadium was refurbished and modified to accommodate 30,000 spectators.

== Reserve team ==
The club's reserve team, FC Hansa Rostock II, has played as high as Regionalliga level, last playing in the Regionalliga Nord in 2009–10. The team currently plays in the tier five NOFV-Oberliga Nord. It first reached Oberliga level in 1992 and has won three league championships at this level, in 2000, 2005 and 2012.

In 1998, 2005 and 2006, it also won the Mecklenburg-Vorpommern Cup, the local cup competition in Mecklenburg-Vorpommern, and qualified for the first round of the DFB-Pokal through this, but never advanced past its first round.

== See also ==
- List of FC Hansa Rostock players
- List of FC Hansa Rostock records and statistics
