= List of clubs in the 2. Bundesliga =

This is a list of clubs in the 2. Bundesliga, including all clubs and their final placings from 1974–75 to 2025–26. The league is the second-highest football league in Germany and the German football league system. It replaced the Regionalligas as the second division in Germany in 1974. Initially played in a two-division format, north and south, it was merged into a single division in 1981 and has remained at this format ever since with the exception of the 1991–92 season, when the league was briefly split again to accommodate the influx of clubs from the former East Germany.

== Overview ==
After the introduction of the Bundesliga in 1963 the second division was initially formed by five Regionalligas with a promotion round at the end. In 1974 this system was changed to two regional divisions which were named 2. Bundesliga Süd and Nord. This halved the number of second division teams from a nominal number of 40 to 20. In the 1991–92 season the league was briefly split into a northern and southern division of 12 clubs each to allow for the entry of the East German clubs into the league system. Since 1992 the league has always operated as a single division, initially with 20 clubs, later with 18.

== List of clubs ==
The list of clubs of the 2. Bundesliga from its inception to the present season, sorted by the last season a club played in the league:

Club	No.	First	Last	Best	Titles	Seasons
Schalke 04	10	1981–82	2025–26	1st	4	1981–82, 1990–91, 2021–22, 2025–26
SV Elversberg	3	2023−24	2025–26	2nd	—	—
SC Paderborn ^{6}	17	2005–06	Present	2nd	—	—
Hannover 96	30	1974–75	Present	1st	3	1974–75, 1986–87, 2001–02
Darmstadt 98	27	1974–75	Present	1st	2	1977–78, 1980–81
1. FC Kaiserslautern	16	1996–97	Present	1st	2	1996–97, 2009–10
Hertha BSC	19	1980–81	Present	1st	3	1989–90, 2010–11, 2012–13
1. FC Nürnberg	25	1974–75	Present	1st	4	1979–80, 1984–85, 2000–01, 2003–04
VfL Bochum	17	1993–94	Present	1st	4	1993–94, 1995–96, 2005–06, 2020–21
Karlsruher SC	30	1974–75	Present	1st	3	1974–75, 1983–84, 2006–07
Dynamo Dresden ^{‡}	11	2004–05	Present	5th	—	—
Holstein Kiel	10	1978–79	Present	2nd	—	—
Arminia Bielefeld	22	1974–75	Present	1st	3	1977–78, 1979–80, 1998–99
1. FC Magdeburg ^{‡}	6	2018–19	Present	11th	—	—
Eintracht Braunschweig	22	1980–81	Present	2nd	—	—
Greuther Fürth ^{3}	35	1974–75	Present	1st	1	2011–12
Fortuna Düsseldorf	20	1987–88	Present	1st	2	1988–89, 2017–18
Preußen Münster	12	1974–75	Present	3rd	—	—
1. FC Köln	12	1998–99	2024–25	1st	5	1999–2000, 2004–05, 2013–14, 2018–19, 2024–25
Hamburger SV	8	2018–19	2024–25	2nd	—	—
SSV Ulm	19	1979–80	2024–25	3rd	—	—
Jahn Regensburg	12	1975–76	2024–25	8th	—	—
SV Wehen Wiesbaden	4	2007–08	2023–24	8th	—	—
Hansa Rostock ^{‡}	11	1992–93	2023–24	1st	1	1994–95
FC St. Pauli	31	1974–75	2023–24	1st	2	1976–77, 2023–24
VfL Osnabrück	26	1974–75	2023–24	6th	—	—
1. FC Heidenheim	9	2014–15	2022−23	1st	1	2022−23
SV Sandhausen	11	2012–13	2022−23	10th	—	—
Werder Bremen	2	1980–81	2021–22	1st	1	1980–81
Erzgebirge Aue ^{‡}	16	2003–04	2021–22	5th	—	—
FC Ingolstadt ^{4}	9	2008–09	2021–22	1st	1	2014–15
Würzburger Kickers	3	1977–78	2020–21	17th	—	—
VfB Stuttgart	4	1975–76	2019–20	1st	3	1976–77, 2016–17, 2019–20
MSV Duisburg	22	1982–83	2018–19	2nd	—	—
Union Berlin ^{‡}	13	2001–02	2018–19	3rd	—	—
1860 Munich	20	1974–75	2016–17	1st	1	1978–79
FSV Frankfurt	16	1975–76	2015–16	4th	—	—
SC Freiburg	22	1978–79	2015–16	1st	4	1992–93, 2002–03, 2008–09, 2015–16
RB Leipzig ^{‡}	2	2014–15	2015–16	2nd	—	—
VfR Aalen	3	2012–13	2014–15	11th	—	—
Energie Cottbus ^{‡}	11	1997–98	2013–14	3rd	—	—
Alemannia Aachen	28	1974–75	2011–12	2nd	—	—
Eintracht Frankfurt	6	1996–97	2011–12	1st	1	1997–98
Rot-Weiß Oberhausen	18	1974–75	2010–11	5th	—	—
1. FSV Mainz 05	19	1974–75	2010–11	2nd	—	—
FC Augsburg	12	1974–75	2010–11	2nd	—	—
Rot-Weiß Ahlen ^{7}	8	2000–01	2009–10	6th	—	—
TuS Koblenz	4	2006–07	2009–10	10th	—	—
Kickers Offenbach	14	1976–77	2007–08	2nd	—	—
FC Carl Zeiss Jena ^{‡}	8	1991–92	2007–08	5th	—	—
Borussia Mönchengladbach	3	1999–2000	2007–08	1st	1	2007–08
1899 Hoffenheim	1	2007–08	2007–08	2nd	—	—
Rot-Weiß Essen	16	1977–78	2006–07	2nd	—	—
SpVgg Unterhaching	11	1989–90	2006–07	2nd	—	—
Wacker Burghausen	5	2002–03	2006–07	8th	—	—
1. FC Saarbrücken	19	1974–75	2005–06	1st	2	1975–76, 1991–92
Sportfreunde Siegen	1	2005–06	2005–06	18th	—	—
Eintracht Trier	8	1976–77	2004–05	7th	—	—
Rot-Weiß Erfurt ^{‡}	2	1991–92	2004–05	12th	—	—
VfB Lübeck	4	1995–96	2003–04	11th	—	—
SV Waldhof Mannheim	20	1974–75	2002–03	1st	1	1982–83
SSV Reutlingen	4	1975–76	2002–03	7th	—	—
FC Schweinfurt 05	4	1974–75	2001–02	3rd	—	—
SV Babelsberg 03 ^{‡}	1	2001–02	2001–02	18th	—	—
Stuttgarter Kickers	23	1974–75	2000–01	1st	1	1987–88
Chemnitzer FC ^{‡}	7	1991–92	2000–01	4th	—	—
Fortuna Köln	26	1974–75	1999–2000	3rd	—	—
Tennis Borussia Berlin	9	1975–76	1999–2000	1st	1	1975–76
KFC Uerdingen 05 ^{1}	11	1974–75	1998–99	1st	1	1991–92
SG Wattenscheid 09	20	1974–75	1998–99	2nd	—	—
FC Gütersloh ^{2}	3	1996–97	1998–99	5th	—	—
SV Meppen	11	1987–88	1997–98	6th	—	—
VfB Leipzig ^{‡}	6	1991–92	1997–98	3rd	—	—
FSV Zwickau ^{‡}	4	1994–95	1997–98	5th	—	—
VfL Wolfsburg	7	1974–75	1996–97	2nd	—	—
VfB Oldenburg	5	1980–81	1996–97	2nd	—	—
FC Homburg	15	1974–75	1994–95	1st	1	1985–86
Wuppertaler SV	7	1975–76	1993–94	3rd	—	—
FC Remscheid ^{5}	5	1982–83	1992–93	8th	—	—
Blau-Weiß 90 Berlin	7	1984–85	1991–92	2nd	—	—
Hallescher FC ^{‡}	1	1991–92	1991–92	11th	—	—
Stahl Brandenburg ^{‡}	1	1991–92	1991–92	12th	—	—
TSV Havelse	1	1990–91	1990–91	19th	—	—
SpVgg Bayreuth	12	1974–75	1989–90	2nd	—	—
Hessen Kassel	8	1980–81	1989–90	4th	—	—
Viktoria Aschaffenburg	3	1985–86	1988–89	13th	—	—
Union Solingen	14	1975–76	1988–89	5th	—	—
FSV Salmrohr	1	1986–87	1986–87	20th	—	—
VfR Bürstadt	4	1977–78	1984–85	13th	—	—
SC Charlottenburg	1	1983–84	1983–84	18th	—	—
TuS Schloß Neuhaus ^{6}	1	1982–83	1982–83	20th	—	—
Wormatia Worms	6	1974–75	1981–82	3rd	—	—
Freiburger FC	5	1977–78	1981–82	9th	—	—
SC Göttingen 05	4	1974–75	1980–81	10th	—	—
Borussia Neunkirchen	3	1974–75	1980–81	18th	—	—
SpVgg Erkenschwick	3	1974–75	1980–81	16th	—	—
SC Herford	4	1976–77	1980–81	14th	—	—
1. FC Bocholt	2	1977–78	1980–81	12th	—	—
Rot-Weiß Lüdenscheid	4	1977–78	1980–81	13th	—	—
Viktoria Köln	3	1978–79	1980–81	4th	—	—
ESV Ingolstadt ^{4}	2	1979–80	1980–81	16th	—	—
OSV Hannover	2	1979–80	1980–81	12th	—	—
VfB Eppingen	1	1980–81	1980–81	20th	—	—
DSC Wanne-Eickel	2	1978–79	1979–80	11th	—	—
OSC Bremerhaven	2	1977–78	1979–80	18th	—	—
Arminia Hannover	4	1976–77	1979–80	12th	—	—
MTV Ingolstadt ^{4}	2	1978–79	1979–80	11th	—	—
SV Röchling Völklingen	4	1974–75	1979–80	6th	—	—
FV Würzburg 04	4	1976–77	1979–80	11th	—	—
Westfalia Herne	4	1975–76	1978–79	5th	—	—
KSV Baunatal	3	1976–77	1978–79	15th	—	—
FC Hanau 93	1	1978–79	1978–79	17th	—	—
Wacker 04 Berlin	4	1974–75	1978–79	13th	—	—
Bayer Leverkusen	4	1975–76	1978–79	1st	1	1978–79
Schwarz-Weiß Essen	4	1974–75	1977–78	7th	—	—
FC Bayern Hof	4	1974–75	1977–78	4th	—	—
FK Pirmasens	4	1974–75	1977–78	2nd	—	—
Bonner SC	1	1976–77	1976–77	16th	—	—
BSV Schwenningen	1	1976–77	1976–77	20th	—	—
1. FC Mülheim	2	1974–75	1975–76	11th	—	—
DJK Gütersloh ^{2}	2	1974–75	1975–76	14th	—	—
Borussia Dortmund	2	1974–75	1975–76	2nd	—	—
Eintracht Bad Kreuznach	1	1975–76	1975–76	19th	—	—
Spandauer SV	1	1975–76	1975–76	20th	—	—
VfR Heilbronn	1	1974–75	1974–75	17th	—	—
Olympia Wilhelmshaven	1	1974–75	1974–75	17th	—	—
VfR Mannheim	1	1974–75	1974–75	20th	—	—
HSV Barmbeck-Uhlenhorst	1	1974–75	1974–75	20th	—	—

=== Key ===
Denotes club plays in the Bundesliga in 2025–26	Denotes club plays in the 2. Bundesliga in 2025–26	Denotes club plays in a league below the two Bundesligas in 2025–26

Club	Name of club
No	Number of seasons in league
First	First season in league
Last	Last season in league
Best	Best result in league
Titles	Number of league titles won
Seasons	Seasons league titles were won in

== Placings ==
=== 1974–1981 ===
The placings in the two divisions of the 2. Bundesliga from its interception to the change to a single-division format:

==== Nord ====
Club	75	76	77	78	79	80	81
Borussia Dortmund	6	2	B	B	B	B	B
Bayer Leverkusen		15	10	8	1	B	B
Bayer Uerdingen ^{1}	2	B	4	7	2	B	B
Arminia Bielefeld	4	9	2	1	B	1	B
Werder Bremen	B	B	B	B	B	B	1
Eintracht Braunschweig	B	B	B	B	B	B	2
Hertha BSC	B	B	B	B	B	B	3
Hannover 96	1	B	5	5	15	3	4
Alemannia Aachen	15	12	7	14	7	7	5
VfL Osnabrück	8	6	9	16	18	8	6
Union Solingen		13	19	9	9	9	7
Rot-Weiss Essen	B	B	B	2	8	2	8
SC Fortuna Köln	5	4	12	4	4	6	9
SG Wattenscheid 09	7	8	15	6	10	5	10
Viktoria Köln					16	4	11
1. FC Bocholt				18			12
SC Preußen Münster	9	3	6	3	3	10	13
Rot-Weiß Oberhausen	18					15	14
VfB Oldenburg							15
SC Herford			14	17		17	16
Tennis Borussia Berlin	B	1	B	10	11	13	17
SC Göttingen 05	10	11	17				18
Holstein Kiel					14	14	19
Rot-Weiß Lüdenscheid				13	19	16	20
SpVgg Erkenschwick	16	18					21
OSV Hannover						12	22
DSC Wanne-Eickel					13	11	
OSC Bremerhaven				19		18	
Arminia Hannover			13	15	12	19	
Wuppertaler SV	B	5	3	11	17	20	
FC St. Pauli	3	14	1	B	6		
Westfalia Herne		10	11	12	5		
Wacker 04 Berlin	13	16	18		20		
Schwarz-Weiß Essen	12	7	8	20			
Bonner SC			16				
VfL Wolfsburg	19		20				
1. FC Mülheim	11	17					
DJK Gütersloh ^{2}	14	19					
Spandauer SV		20					
Olympia Wilhelmshaven	17						
HSV Barmbeck-Uhlenhorst	20						

==== Süd ====
Club	75	76	77	78	79	80	81
VfB Stuttgart	B	11	1	B	B	B	B
1860 Munich	5	4	2	B	1	B	B
1. FC Nürnberg	6	2	5	2	B	1	B
Karlsruher SC	1	B	B	7	5	2	B
Darmstadt 98	10	7	6	1	B	4	1
Kickers Offenbach	B	B	3	5	6	8	2
Stuttgarter Kickers	16	16	10	10	9	3	3
KSV Hessen Kassel							4
SSV Ulm						16	5
SV Waldhof Mannheim	8	8	11	8	16	11	6
SC Freiburg					15	6	7
Eintracht Trier			17	12	10	15	8
SpVgg Bayreuth	9	5	14	4	2	13	9
Freiburger FC				13	13	9	10
FC Homburg	14	3	4	3	7	12	11
VfR Wormatia Worms	19			9	3	10	12
VfR Bürstadt				18		14	13
SpVgg Fürth ^{3}	15	10	8	6	4	7	14
FSV Frankfurt		13	7	15	12	18	15
ESV Ingolstadt ^{4}						17	16
1. FC Saarbrücken	7	1	B	B	8	5	17
FC Augsburg	12	15	9	14	18		18
Borussia Neunkirchen	18				20		19
VfB Eppingen							20
MTV Ingolstadt ^{4}					11	19	
SV Röchling Völklingen	13	6	16			20	
FV Würzburg 04			13	11	14	21	
FC Hanau 93					17		
KSV Baunatal			15	16	19		
FC Bayern Hof	4	9	12	17			
Würzburger Kickers				19			
FK Pirmasens	2	14	18	20			
SSV Jahn Regensburg		17	19				
BSV Schwenningen			20				
Mainz 05	11	12					
FC Schweinfurt 05	3	18					
Eintracht Bad Kreuznach		19					
SSV Reutlingen		20					
VfR Heilbronn	17						
VfR Mannheim	20						

=== 1981–1991 ===
The placings in the 2. Bundesliga from its first season as a single-division league to the last season before the German reunion:

Club	82	83	84	85	86	87	88	89	90	91
Bayer Uerdingen ^{1}	12	3	B	B	B	B	B	B	B	B
1. FC Nürnberg	B	B	B	1	B	B	B	B	B	B
Karlsruher SC	B	B	1	B	7	2	B	B	B	B
FC St. Pauli				17		3	2	B	B	B
Fortuna Düsseldorf	B	B	B	B	B	B	5	1	B	B
Hertha BSC	2	B	11	14	17			13	1	B
SG Wattenscheid 09	17	15	15	10	9	11	4	6	2	B
Schalke 04	1	B	2	B	B	B	B	12	5	1
MSV Duisburg	B	11	3	13	20				10	2
Stuttgarter Kickers	7	5	8	9	6	7	1	B	4	3
FC Homburg				16	1	B	B	2	B	4
1. FC Saarbrücken			10	3	B	15	13	3	3	5
Blau-Weiß 90 Berlin				7	2	B	7	8	9	6
SV Waldhof Mannheim	6	1	B	B	B	B	B	B	B	7
Mainz 05								19		8
SC Freiburg	15	8	7	8	16	8	10	5	13	9
Hannover 96	5	12	14	2	B	1	B	B	8	10
Fortuna Köln	10	6	9	11	3	14	12	4	14	11
VfB Oldenburg										12
Eintracht Braunschweig	B	B	B	B	12	17		9	7	13
VfL Osnabrück	13	10	19		14	6	9	14	15	14
Rot-Weiß Essen	11	14	17			10	11	16	6	15
SV Meppen							14	10	11	16
Darmstadt 98	B	7	12	15	10	4	3	11	16	17
Preußen Münster									12	18
TSV Havelse										19
FC Schweinfurt 05										20
Hessen Kassel	8	4	4	4	5	19			17	
SpVgg Bayreuth	20				18		17	17	18	
Alemannia Aachen	9	9	6	5	8	5	6	7	19	
SpVgg Unterhaching									20	
Kickers Offenbach	3	2	B	19			8	15		
Viktoria Aschaffenburg					13	18		18		
Union Solingen	16	16	5	6	15	12	15	20		
Rot-Weiß Oberhausen			16	12	11	16	16			
BVL Remscheid ^{5}		13	20				18			
SSV Ulm			13	20		13	19			
Arminia Bielefeld	B	B	B	B	4	9	20			
FSV Salmrohr						20				
Tennis Borussia Berlin					19					
VfR Bürstadt				18						
SC Charlottenburg			18							
FC Augsburg		17								
SpVgg Fürth ^{3}	14	18								
FSV Frankfurt		19								
TuS Schloß Neuhaus ^{6}		20								
1860 Munich	4									
Wormatia Worms	18									
Freiburger FC	19									

=== 1991–present ===
The teams are ordered here based on when they were last in the league, starting with the longest promoted teams, current teams, and longest relegated teams. The placings in the 2. Bundesliga from the German reunion to the present season:

Club	92	93	94	95	96	97	98	99	00	01	02	03	04	05	06	07	08	09	10	11	12	13	14	15	16	17	18	19	20	21	22	23	24	25	26
VfL Wolfsburg		14	5	4	12	2	B	B	B	B	B	B	B	B	B	B	B	B	B	B	B	B	B	B	B	B	B	B	B	B	B	B	B	B	B
Borussia Mönchengladbach	B	B	B	B	B	B	B	B	5	2	B	B	B	B	B	B	1	B	B	B	B	B	B	B	B	B	B	B	B	B	B	B	B	B	B
1899 Hoffenheim																	2	B	B	B	B	B	B	B	B	B	B	B	B	B	B	B	B	B	B
Mainz 05	9	12	13	14	11	4	10	7	9	14	4	4	3	B	B	B	4	2	B	B	B	B	B	B	B	B	B	B	B	B	B	B	B	B	B
FC Augsburg																7	14	11	3	2	B	B	B	B	B	B	B	B	B	B	B	B	B	B	B
Eintracht Frankfurt	B	B	B	B	B	7	1	B	B	B	7	3	B	3	B	B	B	B	B	B	2	B	B	B	B	B	B	B	B	B	B	B	B	B	B
SC Freiburg	3	1	B	B	B	B	2	B	B	B	B	1	B	B	4	4	5	1	B	B	B	B	B	B	1	B	B	B	B	B	B	B	B	B	B
RB Leipzig ^{‡}																								5	2	B	B	B	B	B	B	B	B	B	B
Union Berlin ^{‡}											6	9	17						12	11	7	7	9	7	6	4	8	3	B	B	B	B	B	B	B
VfB Stuttgart	B	B	B	B	B	B	B	B	B	B	B	B	B	B	B	B	B	B	B	B	B	B	B	B	B	1	B	B	2	B	B	B	B	B	B
Werder Bremen	B	B	B	B	B	B	B	B	B	B	B	B	B	B	B	B	B	B	B	B	B	B	B	B	B	B	B	B	B	B	2	B	B	B	B
1. FC Heidenheim																								8	11	6	13	5	3	8	6	1	B	B	B
FC St. Pauli	4	17	4	2	B	B	4	9	13	3	B	17					9	8	2	B	4	10	8	15	4	7	12	9	14	10	5	5	1	B	B
1. FC Köln	B	B	B	B	B	B	B	10	1	B	B	2	B	1	B	9	3	B	B	B	B	5	1	B	B	B	B	1	B	B	B	B	B	1	B
Hamburger SV	B	B	B	B	B	B	B	B	B	B	B	B	B	B	B	B	B	B	B	B	B	B	B	B	B	B	B	4	4	4	3	3	4	2	B
Schalke 04	B	B	B	B	B	B	B	B	B	B	B	B	B	B	B	B	B	B	B	B	B	B	B	B	B	B	B	B	B	B	1	B	10	14	1
SV Elversberg																																	11	3	2
SC Paderborn ^{6}															9	11	17		5	12	5	12	2	B	18			2	B	9	7	6	7	4	3
Hannover 96	5	9	12	12	16			4	10	9	1	B	B	B	B	B	B	B	B	B	B	B	B	B	B	2	B	B	6	13	11	10	6	9	4
Darmstadt 98	8	24																						2	B	B	10	10	5	7	4	2	B	12	5
1. FC Kaiserslautern	B	B	B	B	B	1	B	B	B	B	B	B	B	B	B	6	13	7	1	B	B	3	4	4	10	13	18					9	13	7	6
Hertha BSC	3	5	11	11	14	3	B	B	B	B	B	B	B	B	B	B	B	B	B	1	B	1	B	B	B	B	B	B	B	B	B	B	9	11	7
1. FC Nürnberg	B	B	B	15	17		3	B	4	1	B	B	1	B	B	B	B	3	B	B	B	B	B	9	3	12	2	B	16	11	8	14	12	10	8
VfL Bochum	B	B	1	B	1	B	B	B	2	B	3	B	B	B	1	B	B	B	B	3	11	14	15	11	5	9	6	11	8	1	B	B	B	B	9
Karlsruher SC	B	B	B	B	B	B	B	5	17		13	13	14	11	6	1	B	B	10	15	16		5	3	7	18			15	6	12	7	5	8	10
Dynamo Dresden ^{‡}	B	B	B	B										8	15						9	16	17			5	14	12	18		16				11
Holstein Kiel																											3	6	11	3	9	8	2	B	12
Arminia Bielefeld					2	B	B	1	B	13	2	B	2	B	B	B	B	B	7	18			16		12	15	4	7	1	B	B	16			13
1. FC Magdeburg ^{‡}																												17				11	14	5	14
Eintracht Braunschweig	7	19										15			12	18					8	2	B	6	8	3	17			17		15	15	16	15
Greuther Fürth ^{3}							9	8	7	5	5	5	9	5	5	5	6	5	11	4	1	B	3	14	9	8	15	13	9	2	B	12	8	13	16
Fortuna Düsseldorf	B	21		3	B	B	7	18											4	7	3	B	6	10	14	11	1	B	B	5	10	4	3	6	17
Preußen Münster																																			18
SSV Ulm								3	B	16																								17	
Jahn Regensburg													16									18					5	8	12	14	15	17		18	
Wehen Wiesbaden																	8	18											17				16		
Hansa Rostock ^{‡}	B	11	8	1	B	B	B	B	B	B	B	B	B	B	10	2	B	13	16		18										13	13	17		
VfL Osnabrück	9	20								15			18				12	16		16									13	16			18		
SV Sandhausen																						17	12	12	13	10	11	15	10	15	14	18			
Erzgebirge Aue ^{‡}													8	7	7	10	16			5	15	15	14	17		14	16	14	7	12	17				
FC Ingolstadt ^{4}																		17		14	12	13	10	1	B	B	9	16			18				
Würzburger Kickers																										17				18					
MSV Duisburg	B	2	B	B	3	B	B	B	B	11	11	8	7	2	B	3	B	6	6	8	10	11			16		7	18							
1860 Munich	10		3	B	B	B	B	B	B	B	B	B	B	4	13	8	11	12	8	9	6	6	7	16	15	16									
FSV Frankfurt				18														15	15	13	13	4	13	13	17										
VfR Aalen																						9	11	18											
Energie Cottbus ^{‡}							8	11	3	B	B	B	4	14	3	B	B	B	9	6	14	8	18												
Alemannia Aachen									8	10	14	6	6	6	2	B	7	4	13	10	17														
Rot-Weiß Oberhausen								12	6	12	12	14	5	16				9	14	17															
TuS Koblenz																12	10	14	17																
Rot-Weiß Ahlen ^{7}										6	8	12	12	13	17			10	18																
Kickers Offenbach									16						11	14	15																		
Carl Zeiss Jena ^{‡}	5	8	17		6	12	16									13	18																		
Rot-Weiß Essen			20			17								17		15																			
SpVgg Unterhaching		18			4	6	11	2	B	B	15		13	10	14	16																			
Wacker Burghausen												10	10	9	8	17																			
1. FC Saarbrücken	1	B	14	7						8	16			12	16																				
Sportfreunde Siegen															18																				
Eintracht Trier												7	11	15																					
Rot-Weiß Erfurt ^{‡}	12													18																					
VfB Lübeck					13	16						11	15																						
SSV Reutlingen										7	10	16																							
Waldhof Mannheim	2	4	6	5	7	15			12	4	9	18																							
FC Schweinfurt											17																								
SV Babelsberg ^{‡}											18																								
Stuttgarter Kickers	B	15	16			5	12	13	14	17																									
Chemnitzer FC ^{‡}	4	7	9	9	15				11	18																									
Fortuna Köln	11	6	15	8	8	11	6	14	15																										
Tennis Borussia Berlin			19					6	18																										
FC Gütersloh ^{2}						13	5	15																											
KFC Uerdingen ^{1}	1	B	2	B	B	9	13	16																											
SG Wattenscheid	B	B	B	10	18		14	17																											
VfB Leipzig ^{‡}	7	3	B	13	9	8	15																												
FSV Zwickau ^{‡}				16	5	14	17																												
SV Meppen	6	10	7	6	10	10	18																												
VfB Oldenburg	2	22				18																													
FC Homburg	6	16	10	17																															
Wuppertaler SV		13	18																																
FC Remscheid ^{5}	8	23																																	
Blau-Weiß 1890 Berlin	10																																		
Hallescher FC ^{‡}	11																																		
FC Stahl Brandenburg ^{‡}	12																																		

=== Key ===
Symbol	Key
B	Bundesliga
1	League champions
Place	League place
Blank	Played at a league level below this league

=== Notes ===
- FC St. Pauli (1978–79), TSV 1860 Munich (1981–82), Rot-Weiß Oberhausen (1987–88), Kickers Offenbach (1988–89), Rot-Weiss Essen (1990–91 and 1993–94), Blau-Weiß 90 Berlin (1991–92), 1. FC Saarbrücken (1994–95), Tennis Borussia Berlin (1999–2000) and MSV Duisburg (2012–13) were demoted from the league after having their licenses revoked.
- Mainz 05 (1975–76), Westfalia Herne (1978–79) and DSC Wanne-Eickel (1979–80) voluntarily withdrew from the league.
- ^{‡} Denotes clubs from the region of former East Germany which joined the German football league system in 1991. Note that clubs may have been formed after the German reunion which, for example, is the case with RB Leipzig.
- ^{1} Bayer Uerdingen was renamed KFC Uerdingen 05 in 1995.
- ^{2} DJK Gütersloh merged with Arminia Gütersloh in 1978 to form FC Gütersloh.
- ^{3} SpVgg Fürth merged with TSV Vestenbergsgreuth in 1996 to form Greuther Fürth.
- ^{4} ESV Ingolstadt merged with MTV Ingolstadt in 2004 to form FC Ingolstadt.
- ^{5} BV Lüttringhausen was renamed BVL Remscheid in 1985 and merged with VfB Marathon Remscheid in 1990 to form FC Remscheid.
- ^{6} TuS Schloß Neuhaus merged with FC Paderborn in 1985 to form TuS Paderborn-Neuhaus and was renamed SC Paderborn in 1997.
- ^{7} LR Ahlen was renamed Rot-Weiß Ahlen in 2006.
