= 1981–82 2. Bundesliga =

8th season of the second-tier football league in Germany

2. Bundesliga
- Season: 1981–82
- Champions: FC Schalke 04
- Promoted: FC Schalke 04; Hertha BSC
- Relegated: TSV 1860 Munich; VfR Wormatia Worms; Freiburger FC; SpVgg Bayreuth
- Matches: 380
- Top goalscorer: Rudi Völler (37 goals)
- Average attendance: 8,054

The 1981–82 2. Bundesliga season was the eighth season of the 2. Bundesliga, the second tier of the German football league system. It was the first season with the 2. Bundesliga consisting of a single league, after the abolition of the Nord and Süd divisions.

FC Schalke 04 and Hertha BSC were promoted to the Bundesliga while TSV 1860 Munich, VfR Wormatia Worms, Freiburger FC and SpVgg Bayreuth were relegated to the Oberliga.

== Teams ==
For the 1981–82 season, the league abolished the Nord and Süd divisions to form a single-division league featuring 20 teams. The three teams relegated from the 1980–81 Bundesliga, Bayer Uerdingen, 1860 Munich and Schalke 04, entered the league. Due to the format change, there was no promotion for teams from the Oberliga to the 2. Bundesliga. Werder Bremen, the Nord champions, and Darmstadt 98, the Süd champions, were promoted to the Bundesliga, along with play-off winners Eintracht Braunschweig.

The remaining participants of the league, as well as which teams would be relegated from the previous season, were determined by a sophisticated placement system. The top four teams from each division automatically qualified for the league (unless promoted), while teams in 17th and below were automatically relegated. The remaining teams from 5th to 16th place in the Nord and Süd divisions were ranked on various criteria, with the worst placed teams being relegated to the Oberliga.

Locations of the participating teams of the 1981–82 season

=== Team changes ===
Entering league	Exiting league			
Relegated from 1980–81 Bundesliga	Promoted to 1981–82 Bundesliga		Relegated to 1981–82 Oberliga	
Relegated from 1980–81 Bundesliga	Nord	Süd	Nord	Süd
1860 Munich; Schalke 04; Bayer Uerdingen	Eintracht Braunschweig; Werder Bremen	Darmstadt 98	Tennis Borussia Berlin; 1. FC Bocholt; SpVgg Erkenschwick; Göttingen 05; OSV Hannover; SC Herford; Holstein Kiel; Viktoria Köln; Rot-Weiß Lüdenscheid; Preußen Münster; Rot-Weiß Oberhausen; VfB Oldenburg	FC Augsburg; VfR Bürstadt; VfB Eppingen; FSV Frankfurt; FC Homburg; ESV Ingolstadt; Borussia Neunkirchen; 1. FC Saarbrücken; Eintracht Trier; SSV Ulm

== League table ==
Pos	Team	Pld	W	D	L	GF	GA	GD	Pts	Promotion, qualification or relegation
1	Schalke 04 (C, P)	38	19	13	6	70	35	+35	51	Promotion to Bundesliga
2	Hertha BSC (P)	38	20	8	10	84	47	+37	48	Promotion to Bundesliga
3	Kickers Offenbach	38	19	8	11	70	67	+3	46	Qualification for promotion play-offs
4	1860 Munich (Note: TSV 1860 Munich had their license revoked by the DFB and were therefore relegated.) (R)	38	19	7	12	87	56	+31	45	Relegation to Oberliga
5	Hannover 96	38	19	7	12	72	56	+16	45	
6	Waldhof Mannheim	38	16	12	10	51	44	+7	44	
7	Stuttgarter Kickers	38	18	7	13	76	55	+21	43	
8	KSV Hessen Kassel	38	15	13	10	56	46	+10	43	
9	Alemannia Aachen	38	15	11	12	47	39	+8	41	
10	Fortuna Köln	38	14	11	13	70	72	−2	39	
11	Rot-Weiss Essen	38	15	8	15	60	62	−2	38	
12	Bayer 05 Uerdingen	38	14	10	14	47	57	−10	38	
13	VfL Osnabrück	38	14	9	15	49	59	−10	37	
14	SpVgg Fürth	38	10	15	13	61	60	+1	35	
15	SC Freiburg	38	11	12	15	49	54	−5	34	
16	SG Union Solingen	38	11	11	16	51	62	−11	33	
17	SG Wattenscheid 09	38	8	15	15	41	62	−21	31	
18	Wormatia Worms (R)	38	8	8	22	34	74	−40	24	Relegation to Oberliga
19	Freiburger FC (R)	38	7	9	22	52	88	−36	23	Relegation to Oberliga
20	SpVgg Bayreuth (R)	38	7	8	23	40	76	−36	22	Relegation to Oberliga

Source: Bundesliga.de
Rules for classification: 1) points; 2) goal difference; 3) number of goals scored.
(C) Champions; (P) Promoted; (R) Relegated

== Results ==
Home \ Away	AAC	BAY	BSC	RWE	FFC	SCF	FUE	H96	KAS	FKO	WMA	M60	KOF	OSN	S04	SGU	SKI	B05	SGW	W08
Alemannia Aachen	—	4–0	1–1	0–1	2–0	1–1	2–0	3–2	0–0	1–0	2–1	2–0	6–3	1–0	2–2	3–2	1–1	0–1	3–0	1–1
SpVgg Bayreuth	0–2	—	0–6	1–2	0–2	1–1	2–1	3–1	0–0	4–2	0–1	2–3	0–1	1–0	1–2	4–0	3–1	0–2	2–2	2–2
Hertha BSC	4–1	0–0	—	4–2	4–1	2–1	0–0	2–0	2–2	4–0	3–3	0–1	5–1	5–1	3–1	4–0	4–1	0–0	1–2	2–1
Rot-Weiss Essen	1–0	3–0	2–2	—	4–2	0–2	2–0	0–0	5–1	4–1	0–1	1–4	1–1	5–2	1–2	1–0	1–0	1–2	4–2	2–0
Freiburger FC	1–1	3–2	2–3	3–1	—	1–1	2–2	1–3	0–3	3–2	0–1	1–5	2–2	2–0	1–1	0–2	1–3	2–0	0–3	4–2
SC Freiburg	2–0	2–2	0–2	2–1	4–0	—	2–3	3–1	0–0	3–1	2–1	1–5	1–1	1–1	0–1	0–0	1–1	2–0	2–0	2–0
SpVgg Fürth	0–0	2–2	2–0	1–1	2–1	2–2	—	2–4	8–1	1–2	0–0	3–1	1–1	3–1	2–1	2–1	2–0	2–2	0–0	2–0
Hannover 96	2–1	3–1	2–3	3–0	3–3	2–0	2–2	—	1–0	2–0	3–0	5–2	1–0	2–3	0–1	3–1	1–0	1–0	0–0	5–0
Hessen Kassel	3–0	0–0	2–2	7–3	3–0	1–1	1–1	1–0	—	1–1	1–0	3–1	2–0	3–0	1–0	3–0	1–0	2–1	2–2	2–0
Fortuna Köln	0–2	5–1	2–4	2–0	3–2	3–1	3–1	2–2	2–0	—	2–2	2–1	4–3	5–2	1–2	2–2	1–1	3–1	2–0	2–0
Waldhof Mannheim	0–0	3–1	4–2	1–1	2–1	3–0	2–2	1–1	2–2	2–2	—	1–0	3–1	0–1	2–1	2–1	3–2	3–0	1–0	1–0
1860 Munich	1–1	1–2	1–0	4–0	1–1	4–1	3–1	1–3	1–1	4–0	2–1	—	5–2	1–1	2–0	1–1	5–1	6–1	1–0	7–0
Kickers Offenbach	1–0	2–1	3–2	2–1	3–0	3–2	3–2	3–2	1–0	3–1	3–0	2–0	—	2–0	0–0	5–2	1–3	2–1	1–4	2–2
VfL Osnabrück	1–0	3–0	0–3	1–1	2–1	1–0	2–0	1–2	1–0	2–2	0–0	3–3	1–2	—	1–1	0–0	0–3	1–0	3–0	2–1
Schalke 04	2–0	6–0	2–1	1–1	3–3	2–0	3–3	1–1	2–0	2–2	1–0	3–1	3–0	2–2	—	1–1	1–1	3–1	4–0	4–0
Union Solingen	0–1	1–0	1–0	1–2	5–2	1–0	1–0	2–3	3–2	4–2	1–1	1–2	2–2	0–1	1–0	—	4–4	1–0	1–1	4–1
Stuttgarter Kickers	3–0	1–0	1–2	3–0	3–1	1–2	3–1	2–1	1–3	2–2	2–0	4–1	2–0	5–3	0–3	3–1	—	6–1	7–1	2–1
Bayer Uerdingen	1–0	3–2	3–1	1–1	3–1	2–1	2–1	3–2	3–1	1–1	3–1	3–2	2–2	0–4	0–0	0–0	0–0	—	0–0	4–1
SG Wattenscheid	1–3	2–0	0–1	1–3	1–1	2–2	4–3	3–1	1–1	2–2	1–1	1–1	1–3	1–2	0–3	0–0	1–0	1–0	—	0–0
Wormatia Worms	0–0	1–0	1–0	2–1	3–1	2–1	1–1	1–2	1–0	0–1	0–1	1–3	2–3	1–0	0–3	4–3	1–3	0–0	1–1	—

Source: DFB
Legend: Blue = home team win; Yellow = draw; Red = away team win.

== Top scorers ==
The league's top scorers:

Goals	Player	Team
37	(Germany) Rudi Völler	TSV 1860 Munich
34	(Germany) Dieter Schatzschneider	Hannover 96
28	(West Berlin) Thomas Remark	Hertha BSC Berlin
18	(Germany) Michael Kutzop	Kickers Offenbach
18	(Germany) Werner Lenz	SG Union Solingen
18	(Germany) Karl-Heinz Mödrath	Fortuna Köln
17	(Germany) Gregor Grillemeier	Rot-Weiss Essen
17	(West Berlin) Jürgen Mohr	Hertha BSC Berlin
16	(Germany) Klaus Täuber	Stuttgarter Kickers
15	(Germany) Uwe Pallaks	KSV Hessen Kassel
15	(Germany) Wolfgang Sidka	TSV 1860 Munich
