= 1980–81 2. Bundesliga =

7th season of the second-tier football league in Germany

2. Bundesliga
- Season: 1980–81
- Champions: Nord: Werder Bremen; Süd: SV Darmstadt 98
- Promoted: Nord: Werder Bremen; Eintracht Braunschweig; Süd: SV Darmstadt 98
- Relegated: Nord: 12 clubs Süd: 10 clubs
- Matches: Nord: 462; Süd: 380
- Top goalscorer: Nord: Frank Mill (40 goals); Süd: Horst Neumann (26 goals)
- Average attendance: Nord: 5,672; Süd: 4,379

The 1980–81 2. Bundesliga season was the seventh season of the 2. Bundesliga, the second tier of the German football league system. It was played in two regional divisions, Nord and Süd. This was the final season of the original two region 2. Bundesliga, as the DFB sought to integrate the Nord and Süd divisions into a single division for the next campaign. This meant 22 teams faced the drop to the Oberliga (12 from the Nord, 10 from the Süd). There were three promotion spots to the Bundesliga on offer, while the remaining teams would enter the new single league 2. Bundesliga in the next season.

Werder Bremen, Eintracht Braunschweig and SV Darmstadt 98 were promoted to the Bundesliga while twenty two clubs were relegated to the Oberligas.

== Nord ==
The 1980–81 season saw 1. FC Bocholt, Göttingen 05, SpVgg Erkenschwick and VfB Oldenburg promoted to the 2. Bundesliga from the Oberligas while Hertha BSC, Werder Bremen and Eintracht Braunschweig had been relegated to the 2. Bundesliga Nord from the Bundesliga.

=== League table ===
Pos	Team	Pld	W	D	L	GF	GA	GD	Pts	Promotion, qualification or relegation
1	Werder Bremen (C, P)	42	30	8	4	97	33	+64	68	Promotion to Bundesliga
2	Eintracht Braunschweig (P)	42	29	7	6	102	44	+58	65	Qualification for promotion play-offs
3	Hertha BSC	42	31	2	9	123	42	+81	64	
4	Hannover 96	42	20	16	6	88	49	+39	56	
5	Alemannia Aachen	42	24	7	11	80	51	+29	55	
6	VfL Osnabrück	42	22	8	12	76	50	+26	52	
7	SG Union Solingen	42	20	10	12	76	61	+15	50	
8	Rot-Weiss Essen	42	20	7	15	99	74	+25	47	
9	Fortuna Köln	42	18	10	14	83	67	+16	46	
10	SG Wattenscheid 09	42	15	12	15	62	68	−6	42	
11	Viktoria Köln (R)	42	14	13	15	67	79	−12	41	Relegation to Oberliga
12	1. FC Bocholt (R)	42	14	10	18	66	70	−4	38	Relegation to Oberliga
13	Preußen Münster (R)	42	14	8	20	48	72	−24	36	Relegation to Oberliga
14	Rot-Weiß Oberhausen (R)	42	12	11	19	59	84	−25	35	Relegation to Oberliga
15	VfB Oldenburg (R)	42	12	10	20	64	89	−25	34	Relegation to Oberliga
16	SC Herford (R)	42	11	10	21	48	65	−17	32	Relegation to Oberliga
17	Tennis Borussia Berlin (R)	42	9	14	19	47	71	−24	32	Relegation to Oberliga
18	1. SC Göttingen 05 (R)	42	9	14	19	67	98	−31	32	Relegation to Oberliga
19	Holstein Kiel (R)	42	12	7	23	48	81	−33	31	Relegation to Oberliga
20	Rot-Weiß Lüdenscheid (R)	42	8	11	23	43	83	−40	27	Relegation to Oberliga
21	SpVgg Erkenschwick (R)	42	7	8	27	46	91	−45	22	Relegation to Oberliga
22	OSV Hannover (R)	42	7	5	30	41	108	−67	19	Relegation to Oberliga

Source: Bundesliga.de
Rules for classification: 1) points; 2) goal difference; 3) number of goals scored.
(C) Champions; (P) Promoted; (R) Relegated

=== Results ===
Home \ Away	AAC	BSC	TBB	BHO	EBS	SVW	ERK	RWE	G05	H96	OSV	HER	KSV	FKO	FCV	RWL	PRM	RWO	OLD	OSN	SGU	SGW
Alemannia Aachen	—	4–1	1–3	3–1	0–1	2–0	5–1	4–3	3–1	2–1	2–0	3–0	2–0	1–1	4–2	2–0	4–0	0–0	2–0	5–0	3–1	4–2
Hertha BSC	0–1	—	2–0	5–0	2–4	1–2	4–1	3–2	4–0	1–0	3–2	3–1	5–1	5–1	4–0	2–0	6–0	4–2	2–0	2–0	4–2	8–0
Tennis Borussia Berlin	1–1	1–4	—	2–2	1–3	0–1	1–1	1–0	3–2	2–2	1–0	2–1	3–1	1–2	2–2	1–0	1–1	2–3	0–0	1–0	1–2	0–1
1. FC Bocholt	1–0	0–3	1–1	—	1–1	0–2	1–0	1–1	4–2	1–2	4–0	2–1	0–1	1–1	6–2	6–0	0–2	1–0	3–1	2–1	1–2	2–1
Eintracht Braunschweig	1–1	0–4	4–0	3–0	—	2–2	2–0	2–0	4–0	2–0	3–2	3–1	2–0	1–0	3–0	3–3	4–1	3–0	7–0	2–2	1–1	3–0
Werder Bremen	6–0	1–1	3–0	1–2	2–1	—	2–1	1–0	3–0	3–0	4–0	3–1	5–1	2–1	0–0	2–0	2–1	6–1	4–0	3–1	3–0	3–1
SpVgg Erkenschwick	2–3	1–4	1–1	1–0	1–2	1–1	—	0–2	4–0	0–0	3–3	2–1	2–2	0–4	2–3	1–3	0–1	2–1	3–2	2–2	4–2	0–2
Rot-Weiss Essen	4–0	0–4	2–0	5–3	2–6	1–0	2–0	—	4–1	1–1	6–0	4–2	6–0	3–2	4–0	5–4	5–0	5–2	4–1	2–1	2–0	2–2
Göttingen 05	4–2	1–2	5–3	3–2	2–4	1–3	4–0	4–2	—	1–4	6–1	1–1	3–0	3–5	3–3	1–1	2–4	1–1	1–0	1–2	2–2	0–0
Hannover 96	2–1	1–1	5–3	1–1	1–1	0–0	6–1	4–1	1–1	—	4–2	3–2	3–1	4–0	4–0	2–0	3–2	7–2	3–3	1–1	2–3	1–1
OSV Hannover	0–4	0–6	0–1	3–2	0–3	1–3	4–1	2–6	1–1	0–2	—	3–2	0–1	1–0	0–0	2–1	1–0	1–3	2–1	1–3	0–0	1–2
SC Herford	1–1	0–5	2–1	0–2	1–2	0–2	1–0	1–3	2–0	0–2	3–0	—	1–0	0–0	1–2	3–1	3–0	3–1	1–1	2–0	1–1	1–1
Holstein Kiel	2–3	2–1	1–1	0–3	0–2	1–1	2–1	1–1	1–1	0–2	2–1	0–2	—	2–1	3–3	0–0	3–1	3–0	2–1	1–2	2–1	2–0
Fortuna Köln	0–1	3–1	2–2	3–3	5–2	3–2	2–2	3–0	0–1	3–0	5–0	1–1	3–2	—	3–2	5–2	3–0	2–2	4–0	1–2	2–1	3–1
Viktoria Köln	1–0	0–3	3–0	3–3	2–1	1–2	2–1	1–1	0–0	0–0	2–0	0–0	0–3	2–2	—	3–0	3–1	3–0	4–1	2–6	2–0	2–3
Rot-Weiß Lüdenscheid	1–3	1–3	0–0	0–0	0–2	0–1	1–0	2–1	1–1	1–1	4–2	4–2	2–1	1–0	1–3	—	1–0	2–2	1–1	0–0	1–2	1–1
Preußen Münster	1–1	1–0	1–0	2–0	0–1	2–3	0–1	2–0	1–1	1–1	3–2	0–1	2–0	3–2	0–3	2–0	—	1–2	2–1	1–0	2–2	0–1
Rot-Weiß Oberhausen	1–1	1–6	1–1	1–1	2–4	1–1	2–1	1–1	7–1	0–2	2–0	2–1	1–0	1–2	0–0	4–0	3–3	—	2–1	0–1	0–1	3–2
VfB Oldenburg	1–0	2–0	2–0	4–1	0–4	0–3	3–1	3–2	2–2	2–7	4–1	0–0	2–1	5–0	2–2	6–2	3–0	0–1	—	0–0	2–2	3–3
VfL Osnabrück	0–1	3–0	2–2	1–0	2–1	1–4	3–0	4–0	4–0	0–0	3–1	2–0	3–0	3–1	4–1	2–0	1–2	2–1	4–1	—	2–0	3–3
Union Solingen	1–0	1–3	2–1	2–1	2–0	2–4	3–0	3–2	6–2	1–1	1–0	0–0	4–1	1–1	3–1	2–0	1–1	5–0	6–2	2–1	—	2–1
SG Wattenscheid	3–0	0–1	2–0	3–1	1–2	1–1	2–1	2–2	1–1	1–2	1–1	2–1	4–2	0–1	3–2	3–1	1–1	1–0	0–1	1–2	2–1	—

Source: DFB
Legend: Blue = home team win; Yellow = draw; Red = away team win.

=== Top scorers ===
Goals	Player	Team
40	(Germany) Frank Mill	Rot-Weiss Essen
36	(Germany) Werner Killmaier	Hertha BSC Berlin
30	(Germany) Horst Feilzer	VfL Osnabrück
30	(Germany) Ronnie Worm	Eintracht Braunschweig
29	(Germany) Erwin Kostedde	SV Werder Bremen
27	(Germany) Dieter Schatzschneider	Hannover 96
22	(Germany) Thomas Remark	Hertha BSC Berlin
21	(Germany) Bernd Krumbein	SG Union Solingen/OSV Hannover
20	(Germany) Werner Lenz	SG Union Solingen
20	(Germany) Harald Snater	1. SC Göttingen 05

== Süd ==
The 1980–81 season saw Borussia Neunkirchen, FC Augsburg, Hessen Kassel and VfB Eppingen promoted to the 2. Bundesliga from the Oberligas while no club had been relegated to the 2. Bundesliga Süd from the Bundesliga.

=== League table ===
Pos	Team	Pld	W	D	L	GF	GA	GD	Pts	Promotion, qualification or relegation
1	Darmstadt 98 (C, P)	38	24	7	7	85	42	+43	55	Promotion to Bundesliga
2	Kickers Offenbach	38	19	12	7	87	42	+45	50	Qualification for promotion play-offs
3	Stuttgarter Kickers	38	19	10	9	81	40	+41	48	
4	KSV Hessen Kassel	38	16	16	6	59	35	+24	48	
5	SSV Ulm 1846 (Note: SSV Ulm 1846, SV Eintracht Trier, FC 08 Homburg and VfR OLI Bürstadt had their licenses revoked and were therefore relegated.) (R)	38	18	11	9	59	39	+20	47	Relegation to Oberliga
6	Waldhof Mannheim	38	19	7	12	65	43	+22	45	
7	SC Freiburg	38	16	9	13	57	50	+7	41	
8	Eintracht Trier (R)	38	15	11	12	56	52	+4	41	Relegation to Oberliga
9	SpVgg Bayreuth	38	15	9	14	60	53	+7	39	
10	Freiburger FC	38	15	9	14	76	75	+1	39	
11	FC Homburg (R)	38	14	10	14	66	69	−3	38	Relegation to Oberliga
12	Wormatia Worms	38	15	7	16	60	70	−10	37	
13	VfR Bürstadt (R)	38	15	7	16	54	66	−12	37	Relegation to Oberliga
14	SpVgg Fürth	38	15	5	18	54	54	0	35	
15	FSV Frankfurt (R)	38	13	6	19	51	76	−25	32	Relegation to Oberliga
16	ESV Ingolstadt (R)	38	14	3	21	62	92	−30	31	Relegation to Oberliga
17	1. FC Saarbrücken (R)	38	10	8	20	43	61	−18	28	Relegation to Oberliga
18	FC Augsburg (R)	38	7	10	21	55	88	−33	24	Relegation to Oberliga
19	Borussia Neunkirchen (R)	38	5	13	20	44	85	−41	23	Relegation to Oberliga
20	VfB Eppingen (R)	38	7	8	23	44	86	−42	22	Relegation to Oberliga

Source: Bundesliga.de
Rules for classification: 1) points; 2) goal difference; 3) number of goals scored.
(C) Champions; (P) Promoted; (R) Relegated

=== Results ===
Home \ Away	FCA	BAY	BUE	D98	EPP	FSV	FFC	SCF	FUE	HOM	ESV	KAS	WMA	BNE	KOF	FCS	SKI	TRI	ULM	W08
FC Augsburg	—	1–2	1–2	0–1	1–1	2–2	1–1	0–1	3–0	3–5	1–1	1–3	4–2	3–2	4–3	0–0	2–2	2–2	3–1	0–1
SpVgg Bayreuth	2–3	—	0–0	2–1	0–0	0–1	5–1	1–0	3–1	1–1	2–0	2–1	1–2	2–1	0–0	4–3	1–4	1–2	1–3	1–2
VfR Bürstadt	2–0	1–3	—	1–1	2–1	0–1	4–1	1–1	2–3	3–1	1–2	2–0	0–1	4–1	2–2	2–1	3–2	2–1	1–4	1–1
Darmstadt 98	2–2	3–2	5–0	—	2–0	2–0	6–3	1–0	2–1	4–0	9–2	5–1	1–0	1–0	1–0	2–2	1–0	2–0	1–1	5–0
VfB Eppingen	1–1	0–5	2–1	2–2	—	5–1	2–1	1–3	1–2	0–5	1–4	2–4	3–2	2–2	0–2	4–0	1–0	1–1	0–0	2–0
FSV Frankfurt	5–3	0–0	1–4	1–0	3–2	—	2–6	3–2	3–0	0–2	1–3	1–0	0–2	4–2	1–1	3–0	1–1	3–0	3–1	2–1
Freiburger FC	6–1	3–2	3–2	2–0	2–1	1–1	—	1–2	2–0	7–3	2–2	0–3	1–0	5–2	4–2	3–1	1–3	0–0	0–1	3–1
SC Freiburg	1–0	2–1	3–1	0–4	2–0	2–1	0–0	—	2–0	0–1	4–0	0–0	1–1	3–0	4–1	2–0	1–4	0–2	2–0	5–2
SpVgg Fürth	0–1	2–1	0–1	1–2	2–1	2–0	1–1	3–0	—	1–1	3–0	2–2	3–1	8–0	2–1	2–0	1–1	2–0	2–0	0–1
FC Homburg	4–2	1–3	1–1	1–7	1–0	5–1	2–0	2–2	2–0	—	2–1	0–0	2–1	2–2	1–1	2–2	1–1	4–0	2–3	5–3
ESV Ingolstadt	4–1	0–0	4–1	2–0	3–1	3–0	4–3	1–4	2–3	2–1	—	0–2	6–1	3–1	0–5	3–1	0–2	2–1	1–3	0–3
Hessen Kassel	5–2	1–2	4–0	4–4	3–1	1–0	1–1	1–0	1–0	1–0	7–1	—	3–1	2–0	0–0	0–0	0–0	0–0	0–0	4–2
Waldhof Mannheim	2–2	1–1	2–0	2–0	3–1	1–0	5–0	2–0	2–1	4–0	4–0	0–0	—	4–0	1–0	2–1	2–3	1–0	1–0	3–0
Borussia Neunkirchen	3–1	0–1	0–0	1–2	1–1	2–1	0–3	1–1	3–3	2–1	5–1	2–2	0–0	—	0–3	0–0	1–1	2–2	0–1	2–1
Kickers Offenbach	4–1	1–1	6–1	3–1	5–1	2–2	4–2	5–1	2–0	2–0	2–1	0–0	0–0	2–1	—	5–1	4–2	4–0	1–0	7–1
1. FC Saarbrücken	3–0	0–2	0–2	0–1	1–0	3–1	2–2	1–0	0–1	2–3	5–1	1–2	2–0	2–0	1–4	—	2–1	1–1	0–0	2–1
Stuttgarter Kickers	3–0	1–1	3–1	1–2	6–0	6–0	4–0	4–2	2–1	3–1	2–0	2–0	3–1	6–0	0–0	1–0	—	0–0	1–2	3–2
Eintracht Trier	3–1	4–2	0–1	4–0	5–1	2–1	2–0	0–0	2–0	2–0	4–1	1–1	0–5	2–2	4–2	0–1	2–1	—	3–2	1–0
SSV Ulm	3–1	3–0	3–0	1–2	3–1	5–0	2–2	2–2	3–0	2–1	1–0	0–0	1–1	2–2	0–0	3–2	1–0	1–1	—	1–0
Wormatia Worms	3–1	3–2	1–2	0–0	5–1	2–1	1–3	2–2	3–1	0–0	3–2	0–0	3–2	3–1	1–1	1–0	2–2	3–2	2–0	—

Source: DFB
Legend: Blue = home team win; Yellow = draw; Red = away team win.

=== Top scorers ===
The league's top scorers:

Goals	Player	Team
26	(Germany) Horst Neumann	SV Darmstadt 98
25	(Germany) Uwe Bein	Kickers Offenbach
23	(Germany) Franz Gerber	ESV Ingolstadt
22	(Germany) Paul Linz	Freiburger FC
22	(Germany) Bodo Mattern	VfR Wormatia Worms
19	(Germany) Lothar Leiendecker	Eintracht Trier
19	(Germany) Heinz Traser	1. FC Saarbrücken
18	(Germany) Herbert Demange	FC 08 Homburg
18	(Germany) Hans Jörg	FC Augsburg
17	(Germany) Peter Cestonaro	SV Darmstadt 98
17	(Germany) Werner Hofmann	FSV Frankfurt
17	(Germany) Werner Nickel	Stuttgarter Kickers

== Promotion play-offs ==
The final place in the Bundesliga was contested between the two runners-up in the Nord and Süd divisions. Eintracht Braunschweig won on aggregate and were promoted to the Bundesliga.

Team 1	Agg.	Team 2	1st leg	2nd leg
Kickers Offenbach (S)	1–2	Eintracht Braunschweig (N)	1–0	0–2

== Qualification for single-division 2. Bundesliga ==
There was a sophisticated system for qualifying for the new single-division 2. Bundesliga. First, the clubs had to meet technical qualification criteria. These stipulated that the stadiums had to accommodate at least 15,000 spectators and had to be equipped with floodlights within a certain period of time. If these requirements were met, sporting criteria would come into play. The non-promoted teams in fourth place and above from the Nord and Süd divisions, along with the three relegated teams from the 1980–81 Bundesliga, automatically qualified. The other participants (teams from 5th to 16th place in the Nord and Süd) were determined by a so-called "placement number" (German: Platzziffer). This was calculated from the positions achieved by teams in the last three seasons. The lower this number was, the better the club was placed. For the 1978–79 season, the table position was multiplied by one, the 1979–80 season by two and the current 1980–81 season by three. Seasons in the Bundesliga were tallied as zero. For Oberliga seasons in which teams did not achieve promotion, 20 points were added, and 16 points for seasons which teams were promoted. It was also important from which region the three relegated teams of the Bundesliga were from, as well as how many teams were promoted from the respective Nord and Süd divisions. At the end, 10 teams from the Nord and Süd divisions had represented in the next season. Teams in 17th and below from the Nord and Süd were relegated, irrespective of their placement number. There was no promotion for teams from the Oberliga going into the single-division season.

Team promoted
Team remains in league based on league position
Team remains in league based on placement number
Team relegated based on placement number
Team relegated based on league position

Nord
Pos	Team	Place
1	Werder Bremen	3
2	Eintracht Braunschweig	6
3	Hertha BSC	9
4	Hannover 96	33
5	Alemannia Aachen	36
6	Rot-Weiss Essen	36
7	Fortuna Köln	43
8	Union Solingen	48
9	SG Wattenscheid	50
10	VfL Osnabrück	52
11	Viktoria Köln	57
12	Preußen Münster	62
13	1. FC Bocholt	88
14	Rot-Weiß Oberhausen	88
15	VfB Oldenburg	97
16	SC Herford	98
17	Tennis Borussia Berlin	88
18	Göttingen 05	106
19	Holstein Kiel	99
20	Rot-Weiß Lüdenscheid	111
21	SpVgg Erkenschwick	115
22	OSV Hannover	106

Süd
Pos	Team	Place
1	Darmstadt 98	11
2	Kickers Offenbach	28
3	Stuttgarter Kickers	24
4	Hessen Kassel	64
5	SC Freiburg	48
6	SpVgg Bayreuth	55
7	Waldhof Mannheim	56
8	Wormatia Worms	59
9	SpVgg Fürth	60
10	Freiburger FC	61
11	SSV Ulm	63
12	Eintracht Trier	64
13	FC Homburg	64
14	VfR Bürstadt	83
15	FSV Frankfurt	93
16	ESV Ingolstadt	98
17	1. FC Saarbrücken	69
18	FC Augsburg	104
19	Borussia Neunkirchen	109
20	VfB Eppingen	112
