= 1979–80 2. Bundesliga =

6th season of the second-tier football league in Germany

2. Bundesliga
- Season: 1979–80
- Champions: Nord: Arminia Bielefeld; Süd: 1. FC Nürnberg
- Promoted: Nord: Arminia Bielefeld; Süd: 1. FC Nürnberg; Karlsruher SC
- Relegated: Nord: DSC Wanne-Eickel; OSC Bremerhaven; Arminia Hannover; Wuppertaler SV; Süd: MTV 1881 Ingolstadt; Röchling Völklingen; FV Würzburg 04
- Matches: Nord: 380; Süd: 420
- Top goalscorer: Nord: Christian Sackewitz (35 goals); Süd: Emanuel Günther (29 goals)
- Average attendance: Nord: 4,551; Süd: 4,960

The 1979–80 2. Bundesliga season was the sixth season of the 2. Bundesliga, the second tier of the German football league system. It was played in two regional divisions, Nord and Süd.

Arminia Bielefeld, 1. FC Nürnberg and Karlsruher SC were promoted to the Bundesliga while DSC Wanne-Eickel, OSC Bremerhaven, Arminia Hannover, Wuppertaler SV, MTV 1881 Ingolstadt, Röchling Völklingen and FV Würzburg 04 were relegated to the Oberligas.

== Nord ==
The 1979–80 season saw OSC Bremerhaven, OSV Hannover, Rot-Weiß Oberhausen and SC Herford promoted to the 2. Bundesliga from the Oberligas while Arminia Bielefeld had been relegated to the 2. Bundesliga Nord from the Bundesliga.

=== League table ===
Pos	Team	Pld	W	D	L	GF	GA	GD	Pts	Promotion, qualification or relegation
1	Arminia Bielefeld (C, P)	38	30	6	2	120	31	+89	66	Promotion to Bundesliga
2	Rot-Weiss Essen	38	24	6	8	97	54	+43	54	Qualification to promotion play-offs
3	Hannover 96	38	23	6	9	70	38	+32	52	
4	Viktoria Köln	38	16	14	8	77	52	+25	46	
5	SG Wattenscheid 09	38	17	12	9	72	57	+15	46	
6	Fortuna Köln	38	17	11	10	79	54	+25	45	
7	Alemannia Aachen	38	17	7	14	59	56	+3	41	
8	VfL Osnabrück	38	16	8	14	64	68	−4	40	
9	SG Union Solingen	38	13	12	13	66	55	+11	38	
10	Preußen Münster	38	13	10	15	53	59	−6	36	
11	DSC Wanne-Eickel (Note: DSC Wanne-Eickel voluntarily returned their license for the following season to the DFB and were therefore relegated.) (R)	38	15	6	17	63	71	−8	36	Relegation to Oberliga
12	OSV Hannover	38	13	10	15	55	79	−24	36	
13	Tennis Borussia Berlin	38	13	9	16	57	65	−8	35	
14	Holstein Kiel	38	13	7	18	61	67	−6	33	
15	Rot-Weiß Oberhausen	38	13	7	18	46	67	−21	33	
16	Rot-Weiß Lüdenscheid	38	11	10	17	56	73	−17	32	
17	SC Herford	38	11	9	18	48	69	−21	31	
18	OSC Bremerhaven (R)	38	10	7	21	52	79	−27	27	Relegation to Oberliga
19	Arminia Hannover (R)	38	8	1	29	40	92	−52	17	Relegation to Oberliga
20	Wuppertaler SV (R)	38	5	6	27	35	84	−49	16	Relegation to Oberliga

Source: Bundesliga.de
Rules for classification: 1) points; 2) goal difference; 3) number of goals scored.
(C) Champions; (P) Promoted; (R) Relegated

=== Results ===
Home \ Away	AAC	TBB	DSC	OSC	RWE	H96	SVA	OSV	HER	KSV	FKO	FCV	RWL	PRM	RWO	OSN	SGU	WAN	SGW	WSV
Alemannia Aachen	—	1–2	2–3	2–1	7–3	0–0	3–0	3–2	4–1	0–2	1–1	1–1	2–1	0–1	3–1	3–0	4–1	1–0	3–0	1–0
Tennis Borussia Berlin	3–0	—	1–2	1–1	2–4	1–2	3–2	0–0	3–0	0–2	2–1	1–1	2–1	0–3	6–1	1–1	1–2	2–3	1–1	2–0
Arminia Bielefeld	2–0	4–1	—	4–0	3–1	2–0	11–0	7–1	5–1	3–0	3–0	3–1	5–0	2–1	5–1	2–0	2–2	6–0	5–0	5–1
OSC Bremerhaven	4–0	0–0	1–4	—	0–2	2–4	3–0	1–2	1–1	0–1	2–3	1–1	3–1	1–1	1–0	2–4	2–1	2–1	0–0	3–1
Rot-Weiss Essen	4–0	2–3	2–2	3–2	—	3–2	4–1	4–2	2–0	6–0	0–0	0–0	4–0	3–0	3–1	5–2	2–0	3–1	5–0	5–1
Hannover 96	3–0	1–0	2–2	2–1	4–1	—	3–0	0–1	2–0	2–0	1–1	4–2	1–0	2–0	3–2	3–0	1–1	2–0	1–3	2–0
Arminia Hannover	1–2	0–2	0–2	3–2	1–2	1–2	—	1–3	1–0	1–2	2–1	1–3	1–3	2–0	1–2	2–0	1–3	2–1	1–2	3–1
OSV Hannover	0–1	1–1	3–2	0–4	0–2	0–3	4–2	—	0–3	1–0	1–1	0–0	4–1	0–1	3–2	2–2	2–1	2–2	1–1	1–1
SC Herford	1–2	2–2	0–1	4–0	2–1	3–2	1–1	1–5	—	0–1	1–1	1–5	3–1	1–1	4–0	3–2	0–3	0–0	3–3	1–0
Holstein Kiel	0–0	2–3	3–3	3–1	3–3	0–0	3–1	2–1	0–1	—	3–3	1–2	3–3	3–0	0–1	7–1	4–1	1–3	2–1	1–1
Fortuna Köln	3–3	2–0	1–2	5–0	2–1	0–3	2–1	5–2	2–0	0–4	—	2–2	3–1	0–2	6–2	0–0	1–1	3–0	4–0	4–0
Viktoria Köln	2–2	3–1	1–1	5–3	3–1	0–2	4–0	5–2	0–1	3–1	5–1	—	2–0	4–1	4–1	2–1	1–1	2–0	0–0	2–1
Rot-Weiß Lüdenscheid	2–1	5–1	0–2	4–1	0–1	2–1	1–0	0–0	0–0	2–1	1–4	6–4	—	2–1	2–2	2–2	1–1	2–2	3–1	2–2
Preußen Münster	0–1	1–2	0–3	1–3	1–1	1–1	3–2	1–1	1–1	2–1	3–2	2–2	1–1	—	0–0	1–0	1–1	4–1	4–1	3–0
Rot-Weiß Oberhausen	1–2	3–0	1–0	2–1	1–2	0–4	2–1	1–3	4–1	3–0	1–1	4–2	1–0	0–1	—	0–0	0–0	1–0	1–1	0–0
VfL Osnabrück	3–0	3–2	0–0	6–0	2–0	3–1	2–0	3–1	2–3	1–0	0–7	1–0	4–2	3–2	0–1	—	1–1	2–0	1–1	5–1
Union Solingen	1–0	3–1	1–3	0–0	1–2	1–2	3–1	9–1	3–2	4–0	1–2	0–0	1–2	3–1	2–0	0–1	—	3–3	2–2	4–1
DSC Wanne-Eickel	2–1	1–1	1–2	2–0	3–6	1–0	2–1	1–2	5–1	4–2	2–1	3–3	2–0	1–3	3–1	4–1	3–1	—	0–2	2–0
SG Wattenscheid	1–1	4–2	2–4	3–0	1–1	3–0	4–0	5–0	2–1	3–1	0–2	1–0	2–2	5–3	1–0	6–0	3–1	3–1	—	4–1
Wuppertaler SV	3–2	0–1	0–3	2–3	1–3	1–2	1–2	0–1	1–0	3–2	1–2	0–0	2–0	3–1	1–2	1–5	1–2	2–3	0–0	—

Source: DFB
Legend: Blue = home team win; Yellow = draw; Red = away team win.

=== Top scorers ===
The league's top scorers:

Goals	Player	Team
35	(Germany) Christian Sackewitz	Arminia Bielefeld
34	(Germany) Dieter Schatzschneider	Hannover 96
30	(Germany) Norbert Eilenfeldt	Arminia Bielefeld
26	(Germany) Karl-Heinz Mödrath	Fortuna Köln
24	(Germany) Norbert Stolzenburg	Tennis Borussia Berlin
21	(Germany) Gerd-Volker Schock	Arminia Bielefeld
18	(Germany) Ewald Hammes	SG Wattenscheid 09
18	(Germany) Bernd Krumbein	OSV Hannover
18	(Germany) Peter Kunkel	SG Wattenscheid 09
17	(Germany) Norbert Lücke	DSC Wanne-Eickel
17	(Germany) Frank-Michael Schonert	Viktoria Köln

== Süd ==
The 1979–80 season saw ESV Ingolstadt, SV Röchling Völklingen, SSV Ulm 1846 and VfR Oli Bürstadt promoted to the 2. Bundesliga from the Oberligas and SV Darmstadt 98 and 1. FC Nürnberg relegated to the 2. Bundesliga Süd from the Bundesliga.

=== League table ===
Pos	Team	Pld	W	D	L	GF	GA	GD	Pts	Promotion, qualification or relegation
1	1. FC Nürnberg (C, P)	40	26	9	5	88	38	+50	61	Promotion to Bundesliga
2	Karlsruher SC (P)	40	27	5	8	104	52	+52	59	Qualification to promotion play-offs
3	Stuttgarter Kickers	40	22	8	10	94	54	+40	52	
4	Darmstadt 98	40	21	6	13	81	42	+39	48	
5	1. FC Saarbrücken	40	21	5	14	69	56	+13	47	
6	SC Freiburg	40	18	10	12	68	54	+14	46	
7	SpVgg Fürth	40	17	10	13	56	51	+5	44	
8	Kickers Offenbach	40	17	9	14	78	64	+14	43	
9	Freiburger FC	40	15	13	12	78	64	+14	43	
10	Wormatia Worms	40	15	8	17	67	73	−6	38	
11	Waldhof Mannheim	40	16	6	18	57	69	−12	38	
12	FC Homburg	40	13	11	16	58	62	−4	37	
13	SpVgg Bayreuth	40	16	5	19	77	82	−5	37	
14	VfR Bürstadt	40	13	11	16	57	68	−11	37	
15	Eintracht Trier	40	14	8	18	60	57	+3	36	
16	SSV Ulm 1846	40	14	8	18	51	57	−6	36	
17	ESV Ingolstadt	40	13	8	19	57	89	−32	34	
18	FSV Frankfurt	40	13	6	21	63	97	−34	32	
19	MTV Ingolstadt (R)	40	11	7	22	58	81	−23	29	Relegation to Oberliga
20	Röchling Völklingen (R)	40	10	2	28	49	101	−52	22	Relegation to Oberliga
21	FV Würzburg (R)	40	6	9	25	42	82	−40	21	Relegation to Oberliga

Source: Bundesliga.de
Rules for classification: 1) points; 2) goal difference; 3) number of goals scored.
(C) Champions; (P) Promoted; (R) Relegated

=== Results ===
Home \ Away	BAY	BUE	D98	FSV	FFC	SCF	FUE	HOM	ESV	MTV	KSC	WMA	FCN	KOF	FCS	SKI	TRI	ULM	SVR	W08	FVW
SpVgg Bayreuth	—	2–2	1–4	5–2	3–1	0–2	3–1	2–1	2–4	5–1	3–3	3–0	1–1	1–0	1–2	2–1	3–1	1–1	2–0	4–0	2–0
VfR Bürstadt	2–0	—	0–2	1–4	0–1	1–5	1–1	2–2	2–0	0–1	1–3	1–0	1–3	1–1	0–2	2–4	3–2	4–0	3–1	4–1	1–1
Darmstadt 98	1–3	3–0	—	5–1	0–1	2–0	2–0	4–1	3–1	5–0	3–0	2–1	1–2	0–1	2–1	6–0	2–0	3–0	7–1	3–0	3–1
FSV Frankfurt	5–2	0–1	4–4	—	0–0	0–3	1–3	1–0	1–2	1–1	2–3	4–1	1–1	2–2	1–4	2–1	1–0	1–0	1–1	3–2	3–0
Freiburger FC	2–2	4–4	4–2	1–4	—	3–2	2–2	1–0	0–2	2–2	1–4	1–2	0–3	4–1	2–0	3–3	2–1	2–0	3–0	2–2	10–2
SC Freiburg	3–1	1–0	1–1	3–0	1–1	—	2–0	1–1	3–0	1–3	1–0	6–1	1–3	2–1	2–0	3–3	2–0	1–3	5–1	3–3	5–1
SpVgg Fürth	1–0	3–0	0–0	4–2	7–2	0–0	—	1–0	2–0	2–1	0–3	1–2	1–4	0–0	2–1	0–0	3–1	3–1	5–0	1–1	1–0
FC Homburg	2–1	1–1	0–0	2–0	5–2	1–1	1–1	—	2–0	4–0	2–0	2–1	2–1	4–5	2–2	0–1	1–1	3–1	3–2	1–1	0–1
ESV Ingolstadt	5–3	3–1	2–0	3–0	1–1	1–2	0–0	2–1	—	2–2	3–2	2–2	1–3	2–0	1–2	2–2	2–2	2–3	1–6	3–1	3–2
MTV Ingolstadt	3–4	1–1	2–2	6–1	1–2	2–0	1–2	0–1	2–1	—	1–4	0–2	0–1	1–3	2–2	2–1	6–2	2–1	0–1	0–2	1–2
Karlsruher SC	4–0	2–0	2–0	5–2	2–2	4–0	3–0	2–1	10–0	2–1	—	3–1	0–1	2–1	5–2	3–1	1–0	2–1	4–2	4–2	1–1
Waldhof Mannheim	4–3	1–2	1–0	2–0	1–1	1–1	2–0	2–0	2–1	0–0	1–2	—	1–2	0–3	2–3	1–1	3–1	1–0	4–0	3–0	1–1
1. FC Nürnberg	3–0	2–2	1–1	6–0	0–1	4–0	0–0	1–1	5–0	3–1	1–1	3–1	—	0–2	3–0	3–1	3–1	2–1	3–1	4–1	2–1
Kickers Offenbach	6–2	2–2	1–0	2–0	6–1	3–0	2–4	3–0	2–2	1–2	2–1	2–3	1–1	—	3–0	3–3	1–1	1–2	3–1	4–2	2–1
1. FC Saarbrücken	3–0	0–3	2–1	3–2	3–0	0–3	2–0	3–2	5–0	5–0	2–4	2–0	4–1	3–0	—	1–1	1–0	3–2	0–0	2–0	2–0
Stuttgarter Kickers	4–3	3–0	2–1	4–1	4–1	2–0	2–0	8–2	4–0	3–1	2–1	7–0	1–2	3–1	3–0	—	0–1	3–0	8–1	4–0	0–0
Eintracht Trier	1–0	1–3	0–1	5–0	2–2	0–0	4–1	0–2	4–0	2–1	3–4	2–0	1–1	1–0	2–1	3–0	—	0–0	3–0	3–1	4–0
SSV Ulm	1–2	1–1	1–0	1–2	3–1	0–0	0–1	2–2	1–0	3–1	2–1	2–3	1–3	3–1	0–0	3–0	2–1	—	0–1	2–2	2–1
Röchling Völklingen	2–1	1–3	1–2	2–3	1–3	0–2	2–1	1–0	3–1	3–1	2–3	2–1	2–4	3–4	0–1	0–2	1–3	0–1	—	0–1	2–1
Wormatia Worms	3–2	0–1	3–1	3–0	3–4	3–0	3–1	2–0	1–1	1–3	2–4	3–1	2–0	3–1	1–0	0–1	2–0	0–0	4–1	—	4–0
FV Würzburg 04	0–2	3–0	0–2	3–5	2–2	4–0	0–1	2–3	0–1	1–3	0–0	0–2	0–2	1–1	3–0	0–1	1–1	0–4	4–1	2–2	—

Source: DFB
Legend: Blue = home team win; Yellow = draw; Red = away team win.

=== Top scorers ===
The league's top scorers:

Goals	Player	Team
29	(Germany) Emanuel Günther	Karlsruher SC
26	(Germany) Walter Krause	Kickers Offenbach
25	(Germany) Karl Allgöwer	Stuttgarter Kickers
20	(Germany) Bodo Mattern	VfR Wormatia Worms
17	(Germany) Werner Heck	1. FC Saarbrücken
17	(Germany) Hans Krostina	MTV 1881 Ingolstadt
17	(Germany) Uwe Sommerer	SpVgg Bayreuth
16	(Germany) Uwe Dreher	Stuttgarter Kickers
15	(Germany) Eduard Kirschner	SpVgg Fürth
15	(Germany) Rainer Künkel	1. FC Saarbrücken
15	(Germany) Werner Nickel	Stuttgarter Kickers
15	(Germany) Karl-Heinz Struth	Karlsruher SC
15	(Germany) Lothar Wesseler	VfR Wormatia Worms

== Promotion play-offs ==
The final place in the Bundesliga was contested between the two runners-up in the Nord and Süd divisions. Karlsruher SC won on aggregate and were promoted to the Bundesliga.

Team 1	Agg.	Team 2	1st leg	2nd leg
Karlsruher SC (S)	6–4	Rot-Weiss Essen (N)	5–1	1–3
