= 1982–83 DFB-Pokal =

Tournament details
- Country: West Germany
- Teams: 64

Final positions
- Champions: 1. FC Köln
- Runners-up: Fortuna Köln

Tournament statistics
- Matches played: 70

The 1982–83 DFB-Pokal was the 40th season of the annual German football cup competition. It began on 27 August 1982 and ended on 11 June 1983. In the only DFB-Pokal final ever held between two clubs from the same city 1. FC Köln defeated Fortuna Köln 1–0.

== Matches ==
=== First round ===
27 August 1982
Kickers Offenbach	1 – 3	Fortuna Düsseldorf	(AET)
SG Wattenscheid 09	0 – 3	Eintracht Braunschweig
Hannover 96 II	2 – 3	Bayer 04 Leverkusen	(AET)
Fortuna Köln	2 – 0	SC Freiburg
VfL Bochum	3 – 1	Karlsruher SC
FSV Frankfurt	3 – 2	1. FC Kaiserslautern
SV Waldhof Mannheim	2 – 0	Eintracht Frankfurt
1. FC Köln	3 – 1	Bayer Uerdingen
FC Schalke 04	1 – 0	KSV Hessen Kassel
Rot-Weiß Essen	1 – 3	Borussia Dortmund
VfL Osnabrück	0 – 2	VfB Stuttgart
VfB Wissen	0 – 4	Borussia Mönchengladbach
Germania Walsrode	0 – 3	1. FC Nürnberg
Hertha Zehlendorf	2 – 4	Hertha BSC	(AET)
FV Offenburg	1 – 4	SV Werder Bremen
ASV Bergedorf 1885	1 – 5	FC Bayern Munich	(AET)
FC Bayern Hof	0 – 5	Arminia Bielefeld
SpVgg Bayreuth	3 – 1	SpVgg Fürth
FC Ensdorf	1 – 3	SG Union Solingen
SSV Ulm 1846	3 – 1	TuS Schloß Neuhaus
VfR Wormatia Worms	3 – 1	Alemannia Aachen	(AET)
VfB Stuttgart II	1 – 5	Stuttgarter Kickers
Arminia Hannover	0 – 2	Eintracht Trier	(AET)
FC Bayern Munich II	5 – 3	SV Werder Bremen II	(AET)
Freiburger FC	1 – 1	Rot-Weiß Lüdenscheid	(AET)
MSV Duisburg	1 – 1	Hamburger SV	(AET)
Hannover 96	0 – 4	SV Darmstadt 98
KFC Uerdingen 05 II	0 – 3	KSV Baunatal
SVO Germaringen	1 – 2	Hammer SpVgg
1. FC Köln II	1 – 3	1. FSV Mainz 05
SV 1916 Sandhausen	1 – 3	Rot-Weiß Oberhausen
Heider SV 1925	1 – 1	TSV 1860 München	(AET)

==== Replays ====
9 September 1982
TSV 1860 München	2 – 1	Heider SV 1925
8 September 1982
Rot-Weiß Lüdenscheid	2 – 1	Freiburger FC
10 October 1982
Hamburger SV	5 – 0	MSV Duisburg

=== Second round ===
15 October 1982
Rot-Weiß Lüdenscheid	1 – 3	SV Darmstadt 98
1. FC Köln	3 – 1	Bayer 04 Leverkusen
Fortuna Düsseldorf	0 – 2	VfB Stuttgart
Hamburger SV	3 – 2	SV Werder Bremen
Arminia Bielefeld	2 – 0	1. FC Nürnberg
Eintracht Braunschweig	2 – 0	FC Bayern Munich
SG Union Solingen	0 – 2	Borussia Mönchengladbach
1. FSV Mainz 05	3 – 6	FC Schalke 04	(AET)
SpVgg Bayreuth	0 – 1	Hertha BSC
Rot-Weiß Oberhausen	0 – 1	Borussia Dortmund
SV Waldhof Mannheim	2 – 0	FSV Frankfurt
Eintracht Trier	1 – 2	Stuttgarter Kickers
VfR Wormatia Worms	2 – 0	KSV Baunatal
TSV 1860 München	1 – 0	FC Bayern Munich II
Hammer SpVgg	1 – 1	VfL Bochum	(AET)
SSV Ulm 1846	0 – 0	Fortuna Köln	(AET)

==== Replays ====
26 October 1982
VfL Bochum	6 – 1	Hammer SpVgg
9 November 1982
Fortuna Köln	3 – 0	SSV Ulm 1846

=== Round of 16 ===
14 December 1982
Eintracht Braunschweig	1 – 2	Fortuna Köln
Borussia Dortmund	4 – 2	SV Darmstadt 98
Borussia Mönchengladbach	1 – 0	SV Waldhof Mannheim
VfR Wormatia Worms	0 – 4	VfB Stuttgart
TSV 1860 München	1 – 3	VfL Bochum
1. FC Köln	5 – 1	Stuttgarter Kickers
FC Schalke 04	2 – 2	Arminia Bielefeld	(AET)
18 December 1982
Hertha BSC	2 – 1	Hamburger SV

==== Replay ====
25 January 1983
Arminia Bielefeld	0 – 1	FC Schalke 04

=== Quarter-finals ===
12 February 1983
Borussia Mönchengladbach	2 – 2	Fortuna Köln	(AET)
1. FC Köln	5 – 0	FC Schalke 04
Borussia Dortmund	3 – 1	VfL Bochum	(AET)
1 March 1983
VfB Stuttgart	2 – 0	Hertha BSC

==== Replay ====
8 March 1983
Fortuna Köln	2 – 1	Borussia Mönchengladbach

=== Semi-finals ===
2 April 1983
Fortuna Köln	5 – 0	Borussia Dortmund
4 April 1983
1. FC Köln	3 – 2	VfB Stuttgart	(AET)

=== Final ===
11 June 1983
16:00 CEST

1. FC Köln	1–0	Fortuna Köln
Littbarski 68'	Report

Müngersdorfer Stadion, Cologne
Attendance: 61,000
Referee: Walter Engel (Reimsbach)
