= FC Iserlohn 46/49 =

German football club

- Full name: FC Iserlohn 46/49 e.V.
- Founded: 10 September 1949 (as SF Oestrich-Iserlohn); 26 April 2012 (merger)
- Ground: Hemberg-Stadion
- Capacity: 8,800
- Chairman: Jens Breer
- Manager: Christian Hampel
- League: Westfalenliga 2 (VI)
- 2015–16: 4th
Home colours	Away colours

Logo of predecessor side Sportfreunde Oestrich-Iserlohn, ca. 1975.

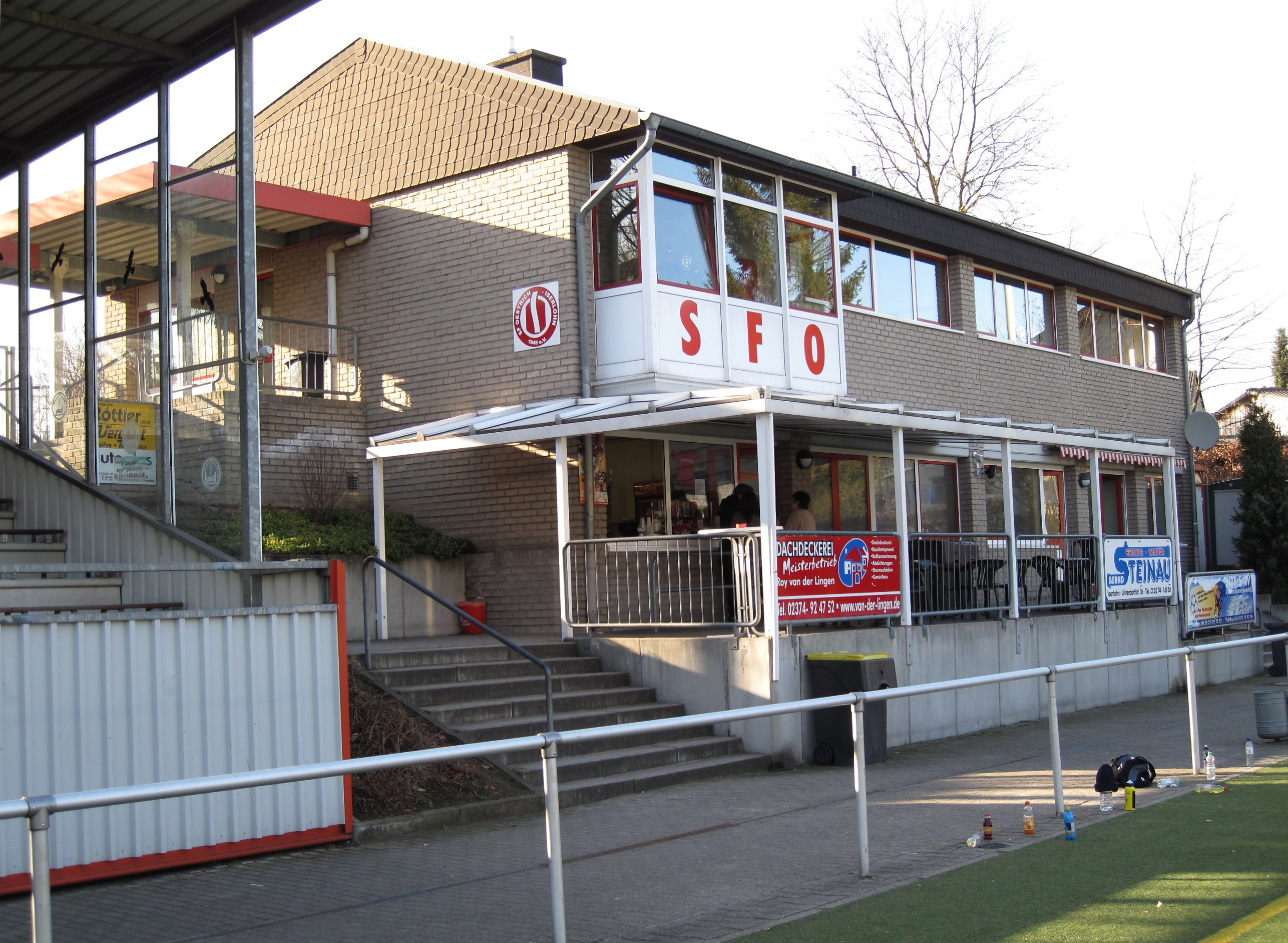
The home ground of Sportfreunde Oestrich-Iserlohn, the Willi-Vieler-Stadion

FC Iserlohn 46/49 is a German association football club from the city of Iserlohn, North Rhine-Westphalia, formed in 2012 from the merger of SF Oestrich-Iserlohn founded in 1949 and TuS Iserlohn which was established in 1846 as a gymnastics club and did not have a football section until 1947.

== History ==
Among the club's predecessor side was Oestricher Fußballclub which was formed in 1911 and later merged with the football department of Turnverein Oestrich von 1881. Like other German organizations, including sports and football associations, the club was dissolved by occupying Allied authorities after World War II. It was re-established as Fußballverein Sportfreunde Oestrich on 10 September 1949 and in 1975 adopted its current name.

Until the mid-1970s the team played in the city and district circuits until earning promotion to the Landesliga Westfalen in 1975. Just three years later they again moved up, this time to the Verbandsliga Westfalen (V). They played there until 1995 when they won honours as league champions and advanced to the Oberliga Westfalen (IV). The Sportfreunde earned mid-to-lower table results as an Oberliga side until a 17th-place finish in 2002 returned them to fifth division competition.

In 2006, the club earned a second-place result but was promoted to the Oberliga over first place DSC Wanne-Eickel when that club was denied a license. In 2008, it became part of to the new NRW-Liga (V) where they finished second from bottom and were relegated to the Verbandsliga (VI) the next year. Another demotion in 2012 saw the club enter Landesliga Westfalen 2 (VII) but before the new season opened, it joined TuS Iserlohn to become FC Iserlohn. The merged club won the Landesliga 2 title in 2013 to send it back to the renamed Westfalenliga, where they play today.

== Honours ==
The club's honours:

- Landesliga Westfalen
  - Champions: 1975, 2013
- Verbandsliga Westfalen
  - Champions: 1995
  - Runners-up: 2006
