= VfL Bad Berleburg =

German football club

- Full name: Verein für Leibesübungen Bad Berleburg 1863 e.V.
- Founded: 1863
- League: Bezirksliga Westfalen (VIII)
- 2015–16: Landesliga Westfalen 2 (VII), 15th (relegated)
Home colours	Away colours

VfL Bad Berleburg is a German association football club from the city of Bad Berleburg, North Rhine-Westphalia.

== History ==
The club was established 1 May 1921 as Spiel- und Sportverein Bad Berleburg. Following World War II organizations throughout the country, including sports and football clubs, were dissolved by the occupying Allied authorities. Following the conflict in 1945 VfL was reorganized as Turn- und Sportverein Bad Berleburg. It was renamed Spiel- und Sportverein Bad Berleburg in 1947.

On 21 February 1970 SSV merged with Turnverein 1863 Bad Berleburg and Skiclub 1909 Bad Berleburg with the newly formed club reclaiming its historical identity as VfL. They went on to advance out of Bezirksliga play through the Landesliga Westfalen to the Verbandsliga Westfalen where they played two seasons in 1975–76 and 1977–78. The team fared poorly in both campaigns and were twice relegated after finishing 17th and 18th.

The club now plays in the tier eight Bezirksliga Westfalen after relegation from the Landesliga Westfalen in 2016.

== Honours ==
- Landesliga Westfalen Gruppe 2
  - Champions: 1975, 1977
- Bezirksliga Westfalen
  - Champions: 1974, 2014
