= 2. Bundesliga Nord (1974–1981) =

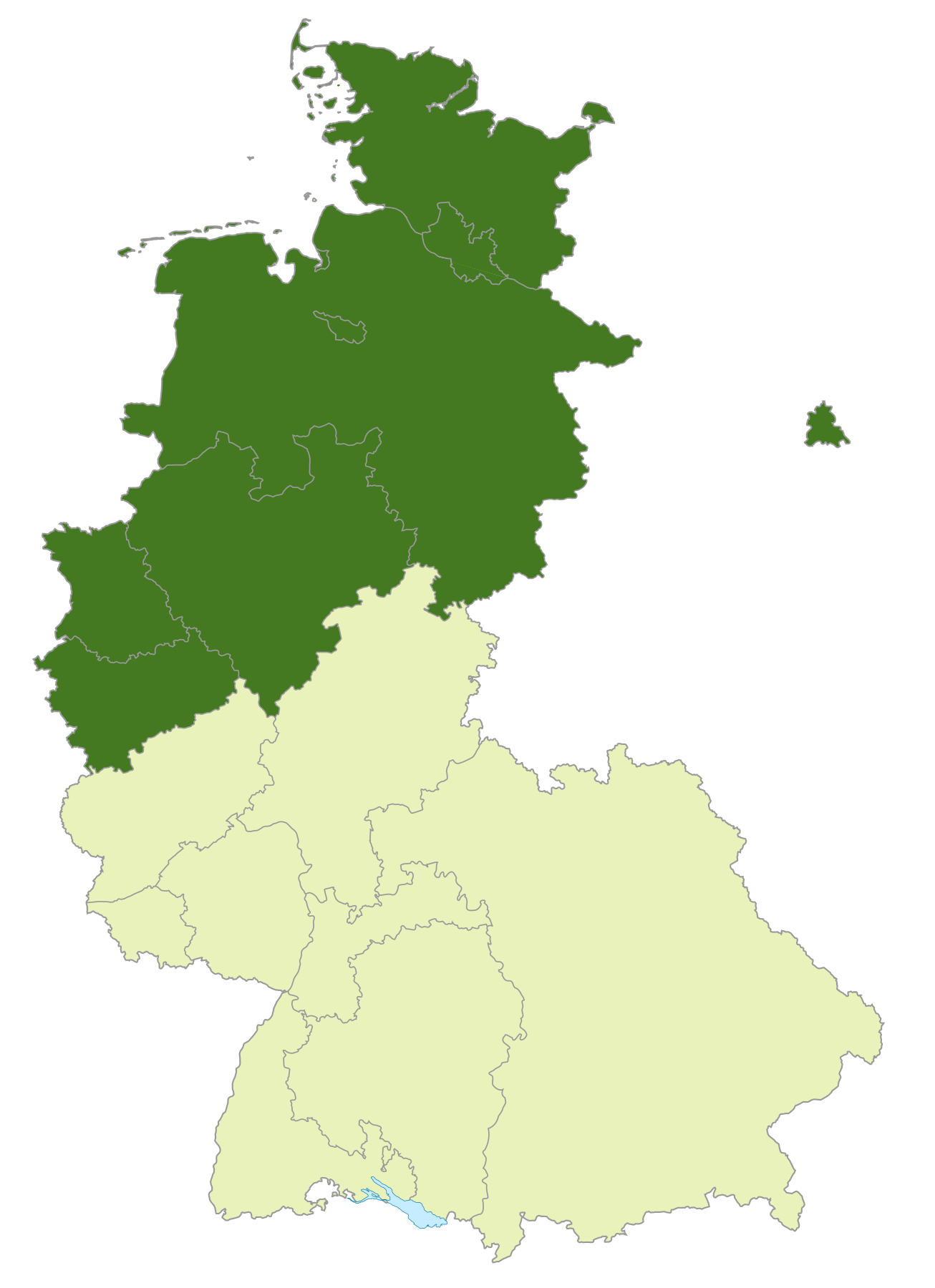
- Founded: 1974
- Folded: 1981 (7 seasons)
- Replaced by: 2. Bundesliga
- Country: West Germany
- State: West Berlin; Lower Saxony; Schleswig-Holstein; Bremen; Hamburg; North Rhine-Westphalia
- Level on pyramid: Level 2
- Promotion to: Bundesliga
- Relegation to: Oberliga Berlin; Oberliga Nord; Oberliga Nordrhein; Oberliga Westfalen
- Last champions: SV Werder Bremen (1980–81)

The 2. Bundesliga Nord was the second-highest level of the West German football league system in the north of West Germany from its introduction in 1974 until the formation of the single-division 2. Bundesliga in 1981. It covered the northern states of North Rhine-Westphalia, Lower Saxony, Bremen, Hamburg, Schleswig-Holstein and the city of West Berlin.

== Overview ==
The league was established in 1974 to reduce the number of second divisions in Germany from five to two and thereby allow direct promotion to the league winners. Along with the foundation of the 2. Bundesliga Nord, formed from clubs of the three former Regionalligas of Nord, Berlin and West, went the foundation of the 2. Bundesliga Süd, which was created from clubs of the other two Regionalligas, Süd and Südwest.

The league was created from twelve clubs from the West, seven from the North and one from Berlin, reflecting the playing strength of the old Regionalligas.

The winner of the 2. Bundesliga Nord was directly promoted to the Bundesliga, the runners-up played a home-and-away series versus the southern runners-up for the third promotion spot.

The bottom four teams were relegated to the Amateurligas, after 1978 to the new Oberligas. In 1979 only three teams were relegated. The winners of the Amateurligas/Oberligas had to determine the promoted teams by the way of a promotion play-off.

The league operated with 20 teams in its first six seasons, expanding to 22 in its last in 1981.

Until 1978, below the 2. Bundesliga Nord ranked the following Verbandsligas and Oberligas:

- Oberliga Nord
- Oberliga Berlin
- Verbandsliga Mittelrhein
- Verbandsliga Niederrhein
- Verbandsliga Westfalen 1
- Verbandsliga Westfalen 2

In 1978 these leagues were reduced to four:

- Oberliga Nord
- Oberliga Berlin
- Oberliga Nordrhein
- Oberliga Westfalen

In 1981, the two 2. Bundesligas merged into one, country-wide division. Nine clubs from the south and eight from the north plus the three relegated teams from the Bundesliga were admitted into the new league, the 2. Bundesliga.

SG Wattenscheid 09, VfL Osnabrück, Alemannia Aachen, SC Fortuna Köln and SC Preußen Münster all played every single one of the seven seasons of the league.

== Disbanding of the 2. Bundesliga Nord ==
The league was dissolved in 1981. Eight clubs of the league went to the new 2. Bundesliga while the champion and runners-up were promoted to the Bundesliga. The twelve remaining clubs were relegated to the Amateurligas.

The teams admitted to the 2. Bundesliga were:

- Hertha BSC
- Hannover 96
- Alemannia Aachen
- VfL Osnabrück
- Union Solingen
- Rot-Weiss Essen
- SC Fortuna Köln
- SG Wattenscheid 09

Relegated to the Oberligas were:

- to Oberliga Nordrhein: Viktoria Köln, 1. FC Bocholt, Rot-Weiss Oberhausen
- to Oberliga Westfalen: SC Preußen Münster, SC Herford, Rot-Weiß Lüdenscheid, SpVgg Erkenschwick
- to Oberliga Nord: VfB Oldenburg, SC Göttingen 05, Holstein Kiel, OSV Hannover
- to Oberliga Berlin: Tennis Borussia Berlin

== Winners and runners-up ==
The winners and runners-up of the league were:

**Season**	Club	**Runners-up**
1974–75	Hannover 96	**Bayer Uerdingen**
1975–76	Tennis Borussia Berlin	**Borussia Dortmund**
1976–77	FC St. Pauli	Arminia Bielefeld
1977–78	Arminia Bielefeld	Rot-Weiss Essen
1978–79	Bayer 04 Leverkusen	**Bayer Uerdingen**
1979–80	Arminia Bielefeld	Rot-Weiss Essen
1980–81	SV Werder Bremen	**Eintracht Braunschweig**

- Promoted teams in **bold**.

== Play-offs for Bundesliga promotion ==
The third promotion spot to the Bundesliga was decided through a play-off round of the runners-up of the two 2nd Bundesligas. Here are the results of this round:

**Season**	**South**	**North**	**Results**
1975	FK Pirmasens	**Bayer Uerdingen**	4–4 / 0–6
1976	1. FC Nuremberg	**Borussia Dortmund**	0–1 / 2–3
1977	**TSV 1860 München**	Arminia Bielefeld	4–0 / 0–4 / 2–0
1978	**1. FC Nuremberg**	RW Essen	1–0 / 2–2
1979	SpVgg Bayreuth	**Bayer Uerdingen**	1–1 / 1–2
1980	**Karlsruher SC**	RW Essen	5–1 / 1–3
1981	Kickers Offenbach	**Eintracht Braunschweig**	1–0 / 0–2

- **Bold** denotes promotion-winner.

== Placings in the 2. Bundesliga Nord 1974–1981 ==
The league placings from 1974 to 1981:

Club	1975	1976	1977	1978	1979	1980	1981
Borussia Dortmund	6	2	**B**	**B**	**B**	**B**	**B**
Bayer 04 Leverkusen		15	10	8	**1**	**B**	**B**
Bayer Uerdingen	2	**B**	4	7	2	**B**	**B**
Arminia Bielefeld	4	9	2	**1**	**B**	**1**	**B**
SV Werder Bremen	**B**	**B**	**B**	**B**	**B**	**B**	**1**
Eintracht Braunschweig	**B**	**B**	**B**	**B**	**B**	**B**	2
Hertha BSC	**B**	**B**	**B**	**B**	**B**	**B**	3
Hannover 96	**1**	**B**	5	5	15	3	4
Alemannia Aachen	15	12	7	14	7	7	5
VfL Osnabrück	8	6	9	16	18	8	6
Union Solingen		13	19	9	9	9	7
Rot-Weiss Essen	**B**	**B**	**B**	2	8	2	8
SC Fortuna Köln	5	4	12	4	4	6	9
SG Wattenscheid 09	7	8	15	6	10	5	10
Viktoria Köln					16	4	11
1. FC Bocholt				18			12
SC Preußen Münster	9	3	6	3	3	10	13
Rot-Weiß Oberhausen	18					15	14
VfB Oldenburg							15
SC Herford			14	17		17	16
Tennis Borussia Berlin	**B**	**1**	**B**	10	11	13	17
SC Göttingen 05	10	11	17				18
Holstein Kiel					14	14	19
Rot-Weiß Lüdenscheid				13	19	16	20
SpVgg Erkenschwick	16	18					21
OSV Hannover						12	22
DSC Wanne-Eickel					13	11	
OSC Bremerhaven				19		18	
Arminia Hannover			13	15	12	19	
Wuppertaler SV	**B**	5	3	11	17	20	
FC St. Pauli	3	14	**1**	**B**	6		
Westfalia Herne		10	11	12	5		
Wacker 04 Berlin	13	16	18		20		
Schwarz-Weiß Essen	12	7	8	20			
Bonner SC			16				
VfL Wolfsburg	19		20				
1. FC Mülheim	11	17					
DJK Gütersloh	14	19					
Spandauer SV		20					
Olympia Wilhelmshaven	17						
HSV Barmbeck-Uhlenhorst	20						

Source:"2nd Bundesliga Nord". Das deutsche Fussball-Archiv. Archived from the original on 5 January 2008.

=== Key ===
Symbol	Key
**B**	Bundesliga
Place	League
Blank	Played at a league level below this league

=== Notes ===
- Westfalia Herne withdrew from the league in 1979 for financial reasons.
- FC St. Pauli was refused a licence in 1979 and relegated.
- DSC Wanne-Eicke' withdrew from the league in 1980 for financial reasons.
