= Dimitrios Daras =

Greek footballer

Personal information
- Date of birth: 21 April 1956 (age 70)
- Place of birth: Greece
- Position: Midfielder

Senior career*
Years	Team	Apps	(Gls)
1975–1979	Werder Bremen	4	(0)
1979–1980	Atlas Delmenhorst	29	(0)
1980–1981	Holstein Kiel	29	(6)
1981–1982	Union Solingen	19	(1)
Total		81	(7)
- * Club domestic league appearances and goals

Dimitrios Daras (born 21 April 1956) is a Greek former professional footballer who played as a midfielder.
