= Jahnstadion (Göttingen) =

Multi-use stadium in Göttingen, Germany

Coordinates: 51°31′9″N 9°55′35″E

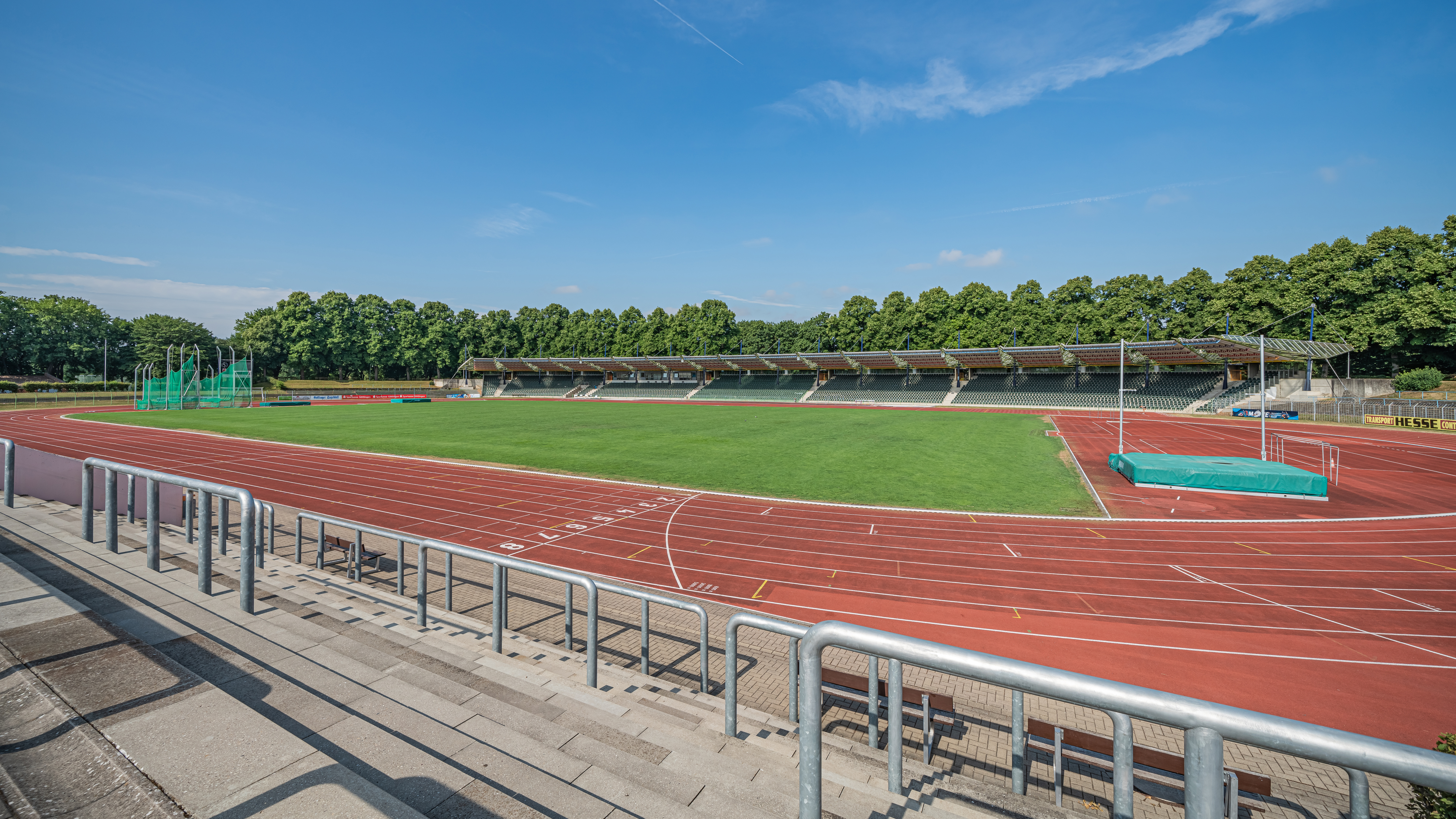
- Interactive map of Jahnstadion
- Location: Göttingen, Germany
- Owner: Stadt Göttingen (Göttinger Sport & Freizeit GmbH & Co. KG)
- Capacity: 17,000

Construction
- Opened: October 26, 1913
- Renovated: 1987, 2008

Tenants
- LG Göttingen, 1. SC von 1905 Göttingen

Jahnstadion is a multi-use stadium in Göttingen, Germany, and the largest of its kind in the city. It is used mostly for football matches and serves as the home of the RSV Göttingen 05. The stadium holds 17,000 people.
