= Thomas Zetzmann =

German footballer

Personal information
- Full name: Thomas Zetzmann
- Date of birth: 14 December 1970 (age 55)
- Place of birth: West Berlin, West Germany
- Position: Midfielder

Youth career
- Tennis Borussia Berlin
- 1988–1989: Borussia Dortmund

Senior career*
Years	Team	Apps	(Gls)
1989–1990	Borussia Dortmund II		
1990–1991	Hertha BSC	3	(1)
1991–1992	Rot-Weiss Essen		
1992–1993	VfR Sölde		
1993–1998	SpVgg Erkenschwick	41	(0)
- * Club domestic league appearances and goals as of 20:04, 9 June 2018 (UTC)

Thomas Zetzmann (born 14 December 1970) is a retired German footballer who played as a midfielder.
