= Nattenberg-Stadion =

Football stadium in Lüdenscheid, Germany

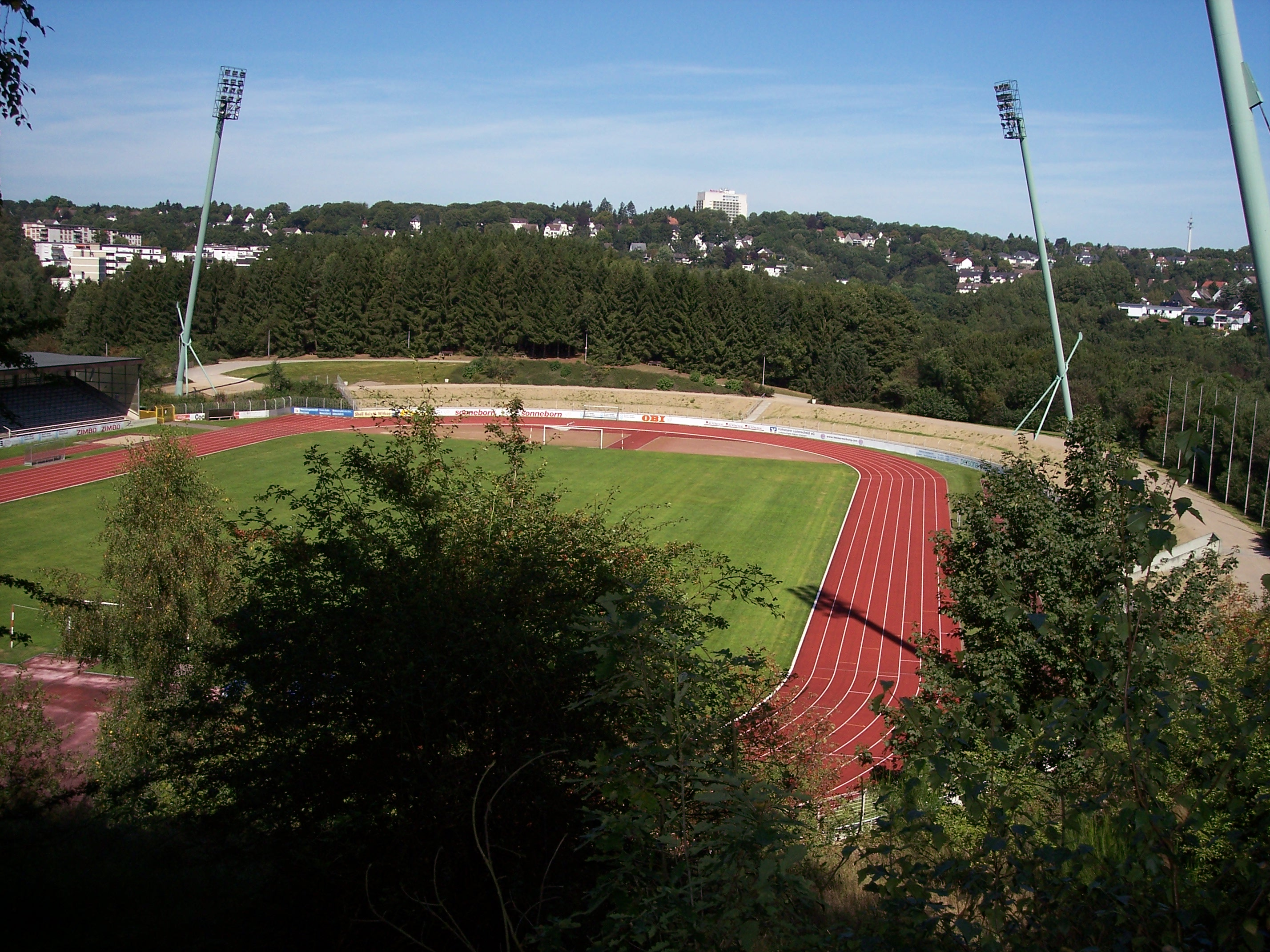
- Interactive map of Nattenberg-Stadion
- Location: (Germany) Lüdenscheid
- Coordinates: 51°12′28″N 7°37′9″E
- Owner: City of Lüdenscheid
- Capacity: 7,102, Previously 17,000
- Surface: Natural Grass

Construction
- Opened: 1972

Tenant
- Rot-Weiß Lüdenscheid

Nattenbergstadion is a multi-use stadium in Lüdenscheid, Germany. It is currently used mostly for football matches and hosts the home matches of Rot-Weiß Lüdenscheid. The stadium is able to hold 17,000 people.
