= Hammer SpVg =

German football club

- Full name: Hammer Spielvereinigung 03/04 e.V.
- Nickname: HSV
- Founded: 1903
- Ground: EVORA-Arena
- Capacity: 8,500
- Chairman: Jürgen Graef
- Manager: Steven Degelmann
- League: Oberliga Westfalen (V)
- 2018–19: Oberliga Westfalen, 12th
Home colours	Away colours

Hammer SpVg is a German association football club from the city of Hamm, North Rhine-Westphalia. It is part of a larger sports club with some 1,500 members in departments for aikido, judo, cheerleading, fitness and dance, gymnastics, handball, roller hockey, volleyball, and water gymnastics.

== History ==
The club was founded 11 April 1903 as Hammer FC and was joined in July 1912 by the membership of Gymnasialer FC Hamm which had been established 25 February 1903. In 1919, following World War I, the club merged with Hammer Turnverein 1859 to form TuS 1859/1903 Hamm. That union lasted only until 1922, when FC found a new partner in Hammer Sportverein 1904 to create Hammer SpVgg 03/04. The combined side soon began to enjoy some success in play in the regional top flight Rheinisch Westfälischer Spielverband. The club earned a second-place finish in 1929 and a divisional title in 1932.

Generally a lower division local side throughout its history, the club rose as high as third division play with a single season appearance in the Regionalliga West in 1966–67. After competing in the Verbandsliga Westfalen (IV-V) through the late-60s and the 70s Hamm won its way through to the Oberliga Westfalen (IV) in 1980 where they played there as a lower table side until being relegated in 1990. The club made German Cup appearances in 1980–81 and 1982–83, on both occasions advancing to the second round before going out. They returned to fourth division play in 1994 until being sent down in 1999. Hammer SpVg is again competing in the Oberliga Westfalen after emerging out of the Verbandsliga playoffs in 2006.

The club became part of the new NRW-Liga in 2008 but was relegated to the Westfalenliga in 2010. When the Oberliga Westfalen was reformed in 2012 Hammer SpVg became part of this league again.

== Honours ==
The club's honours: as Hammer SV

- Westphalia champions: 1920

as Hammer SpVg

- Verbandsliga Westfalen
  - Champions: 1966, 1980, 1993, 2006

== Recent seasons ==
The recent season-by-season performance of the club:

Season	Division	Tier	Position
1963–64	Verbandsliga Westfalen 1	III	9th
1964–65	Verbandsliga Westfalen 1	III	6th
1965–66	Verbandsliga Westfalen 1	III	1st ↑
1966–67	Regionalliga West	II	16th ↓
1967–68	Verbandsliga Westfalen 1	III	2nd
1968–69	Verbandsliga Westfalen 1	III	3rd
1969–70	Verbandsliga Westfalen 1	III	3rd
1970–71	Verbandsliga Westfalen 1	III	2nd
1971–72	Verbandsliga Westfalen 1	III	7th
1972–73	Verbandsliga Westfalen 1	III	11th
1973–74	Verbandsliga Westfalen 1	III	13th
1974–75	Verbandsliga Westfalen 1	III	5th
1975–76	Verbandsliga Westfalen 1	III	4th
1976–77	Verbandsliga Westfalen 1	III	16th
1977–78	Verbandsliga Westfalen 1	III	18th ↓↓
1978–79	Landesliga Westfalen	V	↑
1979–80	Verbandsliga Westfalen 1	IV	1st ↑
1980–81	Oberliga Westfalen	III	8th
1981–82	Oberliga Westfalen	III	10th
1982–83	Oberliga Westfalen	III	14th
1983–84	Oberliga Westfalen	III	16th
1984–85	Oberliga Westfalen	III	6th
1985–86	Oberliga Westfalen	III	13th
1986–87	Oberliga Westfalen	III	12th
1987–88	Oberliga Westfalen	III	9th
1988–89	Oberliga Westfalen	III	13th
1989–90	Oberliga Westfalen	III	14th ↓
1990–91	Verbandsliga Westfalen 1	IV	3rd
1991–92	Verbandsliga Westfalen 1	IV	9th
1992–93	Verbandsliga Westfalen 1	IV	1st
1993–94	Verbandsliga Westfalen 1	IV	2nd
1994–95	Oberliga Westfalen	IV	11th
1995–96	Oberliga Westfalen	IV	6th
1996–97	Oberliga Westfalen	IV	9th
1997–98	Oberliga Westfalen	IV	10th
1998–99	Oberliga Westfalen	IV	16th ↓
1999–2000	Verbandsliga Westfalen 1	V	12th
2000–01	Verbandsliga Westfalen 1	V	5th
2001–02	Verbandsliga Westfalen 1	V	8th
2002–03	Verbandsliga Westfalen 1	V	12th
2003–04	Verbandsliga Westfalen 1	V	8th
2004–05	Verbandsliga Westfalen 1	V	8th
2005–06	Verbandsliga Westfalen 1	V	1st ↑
2006–07	Oberliga Westfalen	IV	14th
2007–08	Oberliga Westfalen	IV	8th ↓
2008–09	NRW-Liga	V	16th
2009–10	NRW-Liga	V	17th ↓
2010–11	Westfalenliga 1	VI	5th
2011–12	Westfalenliga 1	VI	2nd ↑
2012–13	Oberliga Westfalen	V	12th
2013–14	Oberliga Westfalen	V	13th
2014–15	Oberliga Westfalen	V	11th
2015–16	Oberliga Westfalen	V	14th
2016–17	Oberliga Westfalen	V	3rd
2017–18	Oberliga Westfalen	V	4th
2018–19	Oberliga Westfalen	V	16th
2019–20	Oberliga Westfalen	V	18th
2020–21	Oberliga Westfalen	V	21st
2021–22	Oberliga Westfalen	V	21st ↓
2022–23	Westfalenliga 1	VI	9th
2023–24	Westfalenliga 1	VI	16th ↓
2024–25	Landesliga Westfalen 4	VII	10th
2025–26	Landesliga Westfalen 4	VII	
