= Franz-Josef Steininger =

German footballer (born 1960)

Personal information
- Date of birth: July 9, 1960 (age 66)
- Height: 1.71 m (5 ft 7 in)
- Positions: Midfielder; defender; striker

Senior career*
Years	Team	Apps	(Gls)
1979–1986	MSV Duisburg	176	(14)
1986–1987	Union Solingen	38	(12)
1987–1989	1. FC Saarbrücken	62	(6)
1989–1995	MSV Duisburg	192	(9)
- * Club domestic league appearances and goals

Franz-Josef 'Pino' Steininger (born July 9, 1960) is a retired German football player.
