= DSC Wanne-Eickel =

German football club

- Full name: Deutscher Sport Club Wanne-Eickel
- Founded: 1954
- Ground: Sportpark Wanne-Süd
- Capacity: 13,500
- Chairman: Norbert Lücke
- League: Westfalenliga 2 (VI)
- 2015–16: 9th
Home colours	Away colours

DSC Wanne-Eickel is a German association football club that plays in Herne, North Rhine-Westphalia.

== History ==
The club was founded in 1954 as TB Eickel when it left Sportfreunde Wanne-Eickel, a short-lived union it had formed with SV Preußen 04 Wanne, in 1950. It took on the name DSC Wanne-Eickel in 1969. In addition to a football team the club has departments for judo, model airplane flying, bowling, handball, watersports and physical fitness.

A third division side since 1960, it earned promotion to the 2. Bundesliga Nord late in the 1970s and played the 1978 and 1979 seasons there. The club voluntarily bowed out in spite of 11th and 13th-place finishes well clear of the relegation zone in the face of dismal attendance and an increasingly untenable financial situation. It returned to third division play where it played until the early 1990s before slipping to the Verbandsliga Westfalen-Sudwest (V). The football department became independent in 2000 and from the 2003–04 season played in the tier VI Landesliga Westfalen-West, gaining promotion to the Verbandsliga Westfalen again in 2005.

The club now plays in the Westfalenliga, formerly the Verbandsliga.

== Honours ==
The club's honours:

- Westfalenliga
  - Champions: 1978, 2006
- Westphalia Cup
  - Winners: 1986

== Stadium ==
DSC plays in the Sportpark Wanne-Süd (capacity 16,000) built in 1956. A seating grandstand was added in the early 1990s.
