= 1. SC Göttingen 05 =

German football club

- Full name: 1. Sport-Club von 1905 e.V.
- Founded: 30 June 1905; 27.09.2012
- Ground: Jahnstadion
- Capacity: 17,000
- Manager: Jelle Brinkwerth
- League: Landesliga Braunschweig (VI)
- 2024/25: Landesliga Braunschweig (VI), 3rd of 16
Home colours	Away colours

1. SC Göttingen 05 is a German football club based in Göttingen, Lower Saxony. The club is the second to use that name.

== History ==
The first incarnation of 1898 was disbanded by 1903 and a new club was started up in 1905 as Göttinger FC 05. In 1920 it was renamed to VfR 05 Göttingen and in 1921, to 1. SC Göttingen 05. For the most part, the club lived out its existence as a side known only locally in northern Germany. They played in the Westdeutscher Spielverband between 1921 and 1933, and after the re-organization of German football under the Third Reich, joined the Gauliga Niedersachsen. After World War II, the team was disbanded and re-formed as Schwarz-Gelb Göttingen. They took on the name 1. SC Göttingen 05 again in 1948 and at the same time joined first-class Oberliga Nord. The club spent ten years there, with their best result being a fifth-place finish, before slipping to the Amateurliga Niedersachsen-Ost (III).

Göttingen played their way into the Regionalliga Nord (II) in 1964–65 for a run of thirteen seasons with good results early on including three consecutive second-place finishes. The club failed in three attempts to advance to the Bundesliga through the promotion rounds in 1967, 1968, and 1974. In 1974, Göttingen was one of the founding members of the 2. Bundesliga Nord. By the late-1970s the team slipped to the III tier Amateur-Oberliga Nord, with one last appearance in the 2. Bundesliga in 1980–81, followed by a temporary fall to IV division play in the mid-1990s. In 1996 and 1999, Göttingen won promotion back into the Regionalliga Nord (III), just to suffer relegation again in 1998 respectively 2000. A solid effort and first-place finish in the Oberliga Niedersachsen/Bremen (IV), followed by a clean run through the promotion round in 2001 was wasted when the club could not get a license due to its shaky financial condition. By September 2003 the club was bankrupt: its Verbandsliga games were cancelled and its operation folded up.

A new side dubbed 1. FC Göttingen 05 rose from the ashes and its youth teams returned to the pitch. A merger was arranged with RSV Geismar which needed some help after being relegated and also having their own side fall apart. The combined side has returned to play in 2005–06 as RSV Göttingen 05. After a fourth and a fifth place finally succeeded in the 2010/11 season the championship in the now called Landesliga Braunschweig. The highlight of the season was the 1–1 draw in the local derby at SVG Göttingen in front of 2,500 spectators.

With the promotion, RSV plays in the fifth-tier Oberliga Niedersachsen, where the team finished 13th in the 2011/12 season. On September 20, 2012, the board of RSV Göttingen 05 unanimously decided to spin off the soccer department from the club and transfer the playing rights of the first men's team to 1. SC Göttingen 05, which was founded on September 27, 2012. The new club bears the same name as its predecessor, 1. SC Göttingen 05, which had to be dissolved in 2003 due to insolvency. The club sees itself in its tradition, even if it is not a successor club in the legal sense. In the course of this, the black-yellow-green RSV emblem was replaced by the old black-yellow emblem. The new founding of the club took place mistakenly first with the spelling I. SC Göttingen 05. In December 2022, it was decided at the annual general meeting of the club to correct this and to carry the club name in the historically correct spelling of the predecessor club.

After a stint in the tier five Niedersachsenliga the club was relegated from this league after coming last in 2014–15. A year later, the team was relegated to the Bezirksliga, which was followed by direct promotion after a duel with local rivals Sparta Göttingen.

== Honours ==
Historical chart of the club's league performance

=== 1. SC Göttingen 05 ===
- Lower Saxony Cup
  - Champions: 1963, 1967^{‡}
- Oberliga Niedersachsen/Bremen
  - Champions: 1999, 2001
- Bezirksliga Braunschweig 4
  - Champions: 2018
- Wittinger Bezirkspokal
  - Champions: 2024

=== RSV Göttingen 05 ===
- Landesliga Braunschweig
  - Champions: 2011

^{‡} Won by the club's reserve team.
