= SC Herford =

- Full name: Sport-Club Herford
- Founded: 1972
- Ground: Friedrich-Ludwig-Jahn-Stadion
- Capacity: 18,400
- Chairman: Gerhard Klippstein
- Manager: Georg Koch
- League: Westfalenliga 1 (VI)
- 2015–16: 8th

SC Herford is a German association football club based in Herford, North Rhine-Westphalia. The club was formed out of the merger of several local sides in the late 1960s and early 1970s and then went on to enjoy a short turn in second division football in the late 1970s and early 1980s. The footballers are today part of a larger sports club which has departments for athletics, badminton, handball, judo, swimming, table tennis, and volleyball.

== History ==
SpVgg Union 08 Herford was the most successful of the club's predecessor sides having taken part in the early rounds of national championship play in 1930–31. The team also found its way to the first tier Gauliga Westfalen in 1944, but only played a pair of matches that year as the division collapsed as World War II drew to a close and Allied armies advanced into Germany.

In 1963, predecessor SuS 1928 Herford was playing in the Landesliga Westfalen (IV) and was followed the next season by Union. In 1967 Union and VfB Einigkeit 07 Herford merged to form Herforder SC 07/08 which continued to compete in the Landesliga. The combined side earned a second-place finish in 1971 before plunging to the bottom of the table the next season and was headed to relegation.

Herforder was then joined by SuS (16 June 1972) to play as SC Herford which delivered a remarkable turnaround performance in capturing the division in 1973 and advancing to the Amateurliga Westfalen (III). After two consecutive second-place results SC was able to win promotion to the 2. Liga Nord in 1976 where they would play four of the next five seasons before finally being sent down in 1981. The union also paid other dividends as it led to the revitalized side making regular appearances in German Cup play through the late 1970s and early 1980s where they advanced several times out of the first round, but could not make it past the second round.

The club's turn in second-tier football left them with a considerable debt, and they began a slow, but steady slide that saw a descent to the Verbandsliga Westfalen Nordost (V) by the mid-1990s. They returned to the Oberliga Westfalen (IV) for a couple of seasons at the turn of the millennium, but fell back to Verbandsliga, and in 2005 descended to play in the Landesliga Westfalen Ost (VI). A 15th-place finish there in 2005–06 relegated the club to the Bezirksliga Westfalen, Gruppe 1 (VII), from where it returned to the Landesliga in 2008.

The club is now playing in the Westfalenliga again.

== Stadium ==
SC Herford's home field is the Friedrich-Ludwig-Jahn-Stadion and they share the use of the facility with the second division women's side of Herforder SV Borussia Friedenstal. Built in 1955 and re-furbished in the late 1990s, the stadium has a capacity of 18,400 which includes approximately 1,400 seats.

== Honours ==
The club's honours:

- Verbandsliga Westfalen
  - Champions: 1976
- Landesliga Westfalen
  - Champions: 2014
- Westphalia Cup
  - Winners: 1979
