= Rot-Weiß Lüdenscheid =

German football club

- Full name: Rot Weiß Lüdenscheid e. V.
- Nickname(s): Die Reds
- Founded: 17 October 1908; 116 years ago
- Ground: Nattenberg Stadion
- Capacity: 19,000
- League: Bezirksliga Westfalen 5 (VIII)
- 2015–16: 2nd
Home colours	Away colours

Rot-Weiß Lüdenscheid is a German association football club playing in Lüdenscheid, North Rhine-Westphalia.

== History ==
The origins of the club go back to the formation of the Luedenscheider Fußball-Klub in 1908. In the aftermath of World War I, a number of local sides went through a series of mergers. Late in 1918 LFK merged with FC Preußen 09 and SV Luedenscheider 1910 to form VfB Lüdenscheid 08. In 1919, Ballspielverein Lüdenscheid and FC Fortuna 1910 formed another predecessor side called RSV Höh 1910. These two clubs then entered into a short-lived union with Lüdenscheid Turn-Verein 1861. RSV left this union in 1920, and VfB followed in 1924, taking on the name Sportfreunde 08. Finally, in 1971, RSV and Sportfreunde merged to form the present club.

Rot-Weiß enjoyed its greatest success between 1977 and 1981 when it played in the 2. Bundesliga Nord. However, the team consistently flirted with relegation, and after the 2. Bundesliga Nord and Süd were merged into a single, smaller division in 1974, RWL found itself in the third division Oberliga Westfalen. The club bounced up and down between the third and fourth divisions until last relegated in 1997.

After a 13th-place finish in 2005–06 in the Verbandsliga Westfalen (IV), Lüdenscheid was relegated to the Landesliga Westfalen (V). In 2009 it dropped out of the Landesliga as well and now plays in the tier eight Bezirksliga Westfalen.

== Stadium ==
RWL plays its home matches in the Nattenberg Stadion, built in 1972, which has a capacity of 19,000 (2,234 seats).
