= OSV Hannover =

German football club

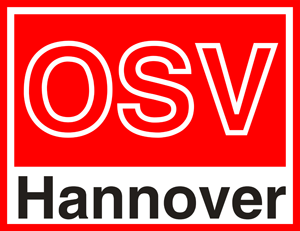
- Full name: Oststädter Sportverein Hannover von 1923 e.V.
- Founded: 1923
- Ground: Oststadtstadion
- Capacity: 6,000
- Chairman: Bianka Heublein
- Manager: Wolfgang Kirchner
- League: Landesliga Hannover (VI)
- 2021–22: Landesliga Hannover Nord, 7th of 9
Home colours	Away colours

OSV Hannover is a German association football club based in the Oststadt district of Hanover, Lower Saxony.

== History ==
The club was founded in 1923 as Freie Sportvereinigung Hannover Ost. The club was dissolved in 1933 in the course of the Nazi regime's politically motivated reorganization of sport and football clubs throughout the country and re-constituted as Oststädter Sportverein Hannover. In 1937, the club merged with the older side MTV Groß Buchholz, which had been founded in 1923.

After World War II the football side was associated with TuS Bothfeld 04 until re-establishing themselves as an independent club in 1953. The club has an unremarkable history, noted only for three seasons spent in Regionalliga Nord from 1972 to 1974, and another two in the 2. Bundesliga Nord in 1979 and 1980. OSV re-established a facility sharing partnership with TuS Bothfeld 04 in the mid-1970s, and had a close brush with bankruptcy in the early 1980s.

The club slipped into obscurity in the lower level local leagues, playing as far down as the Kreisliga Hannover-Stadt (IX) in 2003–05. In 2005, the executive board helped engineer a turnaround when they brought in Wolfgang Kirchner as manager and had former SV Arminia Hannover player Philip Menges join the team as player-coach. The club's fortunes improved greatly and they went through nearly two full seasons unbeaten at home. A championship in the eighth tier Bezirksklasse Hannover/4 led to promotion to the Bezirksliga Hannover (VII). With the league renamed to Landesliga the club today plays in the Landesliga Hannover.
