= Freiburger FC =

German football club

- Full name: Freiburger Fußball-Club e.V.
- Nickname: FFC
- Founded: 1897
- Ground: Stadion im Dietenbachpark
- Capacity: 1,500
- Chairman: Marita Hennemann
- Manager: Ralf Eckert
- League: Landesliga Südbaden Staffel 2
- 2024-25: Verbandsliga Südbaden, 14th of 18(relegated)
| Home colours | Away colours |

Freiburger FC (German: [ˌfʁaɪbʊʁɡɐ ɛfˈtseː]) is a German association football club based in Freiburg, Baden-Württemberg. Freiburger FC were one of the founding clubs of the DFB (German Football Association) in 1900. They currently compete in Landesliga Südbaden Staffel 2, the seventh tier of German football after being relegated from Verbandsliga Südbaden in 2024-25 season.

== History ==
Founded in 1897, for many decades FFC were the dominant club in the city. Their early successes included a South German title in their second season and a national championship in 1907. The club were also semi-finalists of the Torneo Internazionale Stampa Sportiva, one of the first international football competitions in the world, in 1908. Those wins proved to be the height of their success, and they have not won any significant honours since. In 1916, the club managed to win the Südkreis-Liga but the competition was heavily affected by the war and very localised.

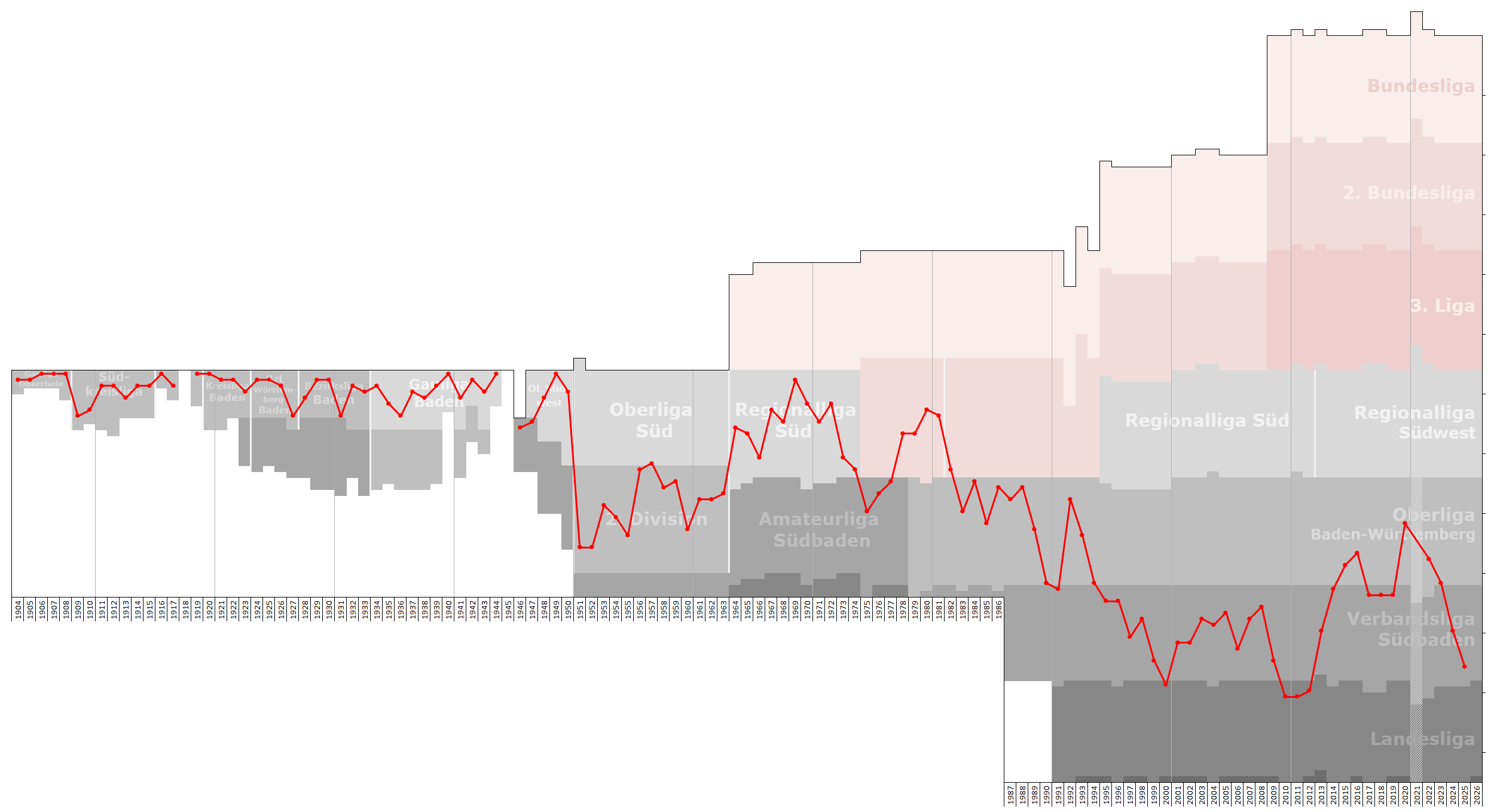
Historical chart of the club's league performance

The club belonged to the tier-one Kreisliga Südwest and then the Bezirksliga Baden throughout its existence from 1923 to 1933. They played mid-table in the Gauliga Baden through the 1930s, and after the Second World War, entered the 2. Oberliga Süd.

With the formation of the Bundesliga, Germany's professional football league, in 1963, Freiburg found themselves seeded in the tier II Regionalliga Süd, while SC Freiburg were playing in the Amateurliga Südbaden (III). FFC slipped to that level for three seasons in 1974–77 before playing their way back to 2. Bundesliga. However the team could not draw support and suffered from poor attendance throughout the following five-year period spent in the 2nd division. When they were relegated to the amateur Oberliga Baden-Württemberg in 1982, only a saving campaign by fans kept the club out of bankruptcy, while SC Freiburg remained in the 2. Bundesliga on their way to the top flight.

Since 1994, FFC played in the Verbandsliga Südbaden, interrupted by the 1999–2000 season, when the club dropped to the Landesliga for a year. In 2009, the club's decline continued with a more permanent drop to the Landesliga. After finishing third in its first two attempts at promotion the club came second in the Landesliga in 2011–12 and qualified for the promotion round to the Verbandsliga. After a 2–2 draw at FC Radolfzell the club achieved promotion by defeating SC Offenburg 5–1.

Continued financial problems forced Freiburger FC to sell its Möslestadion and enter into a sharing arrangement with Blau-Weiß Wiehre. Their former stadium was taken up by SC Freiburg as a youth facility.

After a twenty-year absence, Freiburger FC returned to the Oberliga Baden-Württemberg after winning the Verbandsliga title in 2014 but were relegated again in 2016 season after just two seasons at this level. In the 2018–19 season the club finished second in the Verbandsliga Südbaden and were again promoted to the Oberliga Baden-Württemberg.

== Venues ==
Freiburger FC has played home matches on the sports ground on Schwarzwaldstrasse on the eastern edge of the Freiburg city since 1898. The first international football match in a Freiburg venue took place on this stadium, which could hold up to 6,000 spectators. The Germany national team played an international friendly match against Switzerland on 18 May 1913 and Germany lost by 1–2 in front of 10,000 spectators. In 1922 the FFC moved to the new Möslestadion. In 2000 the club moved to the Schönberg Stadium, and, since 2008, it has been playing in the Freiburg Stadium in Dietenbach.

== Honours ==
=== League ===
- German football championship
  - Champions: 1907
- Southern German championship
  - Champions: 1898, 1907
- Südkreis-Liga (I)
  - Champions: 1916
- Kreisliga Südwest (I)
  - Champions: 1920
- Bezirksliga Baden (I)
  - Champions: 1930
- 2. Oberliga Süd (II)
  - Champions: 1956
- Oberliga Baden-Württemberg (III)
  - Champions: 1984
- Verbandsliga Südbaden (IV-VI)
  - Champions: 1991, 2014
- Amateurliga Südbaden (III)
  - Champions: 1977

=== Cup ===
- South Baden Cup (Tiers 3–5)
  - Winners: 1951, 1991, 1992

== Recent managers ==
Recent managers of the club:

| Manager | Start | Finish |
|---|---|---|
| Walter Güntner | 1 July 1989 | 22 November 1989 |
| Ata Lameck | 23 November 1989 | 21 February 1990 |
| Uwe Ehret | 22 February 1990 | 30 June 1993 |
| Maximilian Heidenreich | 1 January 2001 | 30 June 2007 |
| Ralf Eckert | 1 July 2013 | Present |

== Recent seasons ==
The recent season-by-season performance of the club:

| Season | Division | Tier | Position |
|---|---|---|---|
| 1999–2000 | Landesliga Südbaden | VI | ↑ |
| 2000–01 | Verbandsliga Südbaden | V | 10th |
| 2001–02 | Verbandsliga Südbaden | V | 10th |
| 2002–03 | Verbandsliga Südbaden | V | 6th |
| 2003–04 | Verbandsliga Südbaden | V | 7th |
| 2004–05 | Verbandsliga Südbaden | V | 5th |
| 2005–06 | Verbandsliga Südbaden | V | 11th |
| 2006–07 | Verbandsliga Südbaden | V | 6th |
| 2007–08 | Verbandsliga Südbaden | V | 4th |
| 2008–09 | Verbandsliga Südbaden | VI | 13th ↓ |
| 2009–10 | Landesliga Südbaden 2 | VII | 3rd |
| 2010–11 | Landesliga Südbaden 2 | VII | 3rd |
| 2011–12 | Landesliga Südbaden 2 | VII | 2nd ↑ |
| 2012–13 | Verbandsliga Südbaden | VI | 8th |
| 2013–14 | Verbandsliga Südbaden | VI | 1st ↑ |
| 2014–15 | Oberliga Baden-Württemberg | V | 15th |
| 2015–16 | Oberliga Baden-Württemberg | V | 13th ↓ |
| 2016–17 | Verbandsliga Südbaden | VI | 2nd |
| 2017–18 | Verbandsliga Südbaden | VI | 2nd |
| 2018–19 | Verbandsliga Südbaden | VI | 2nd ↑ |

- With the introduction of the Regionalligas in 1994 and the 3. Liga in 2008 as the new third tier, below the 2. Bundesliga, all leagues below dropped one tier.

| ↑ Promoted | ↓ Relegated |

== Partner clubs ==
The club has strong connections to English football club Guildford City F.C., with Guildford being a sister city of Freiburg, and publishes news and results of the later club on its website.
