= Landesliga Westfalen =

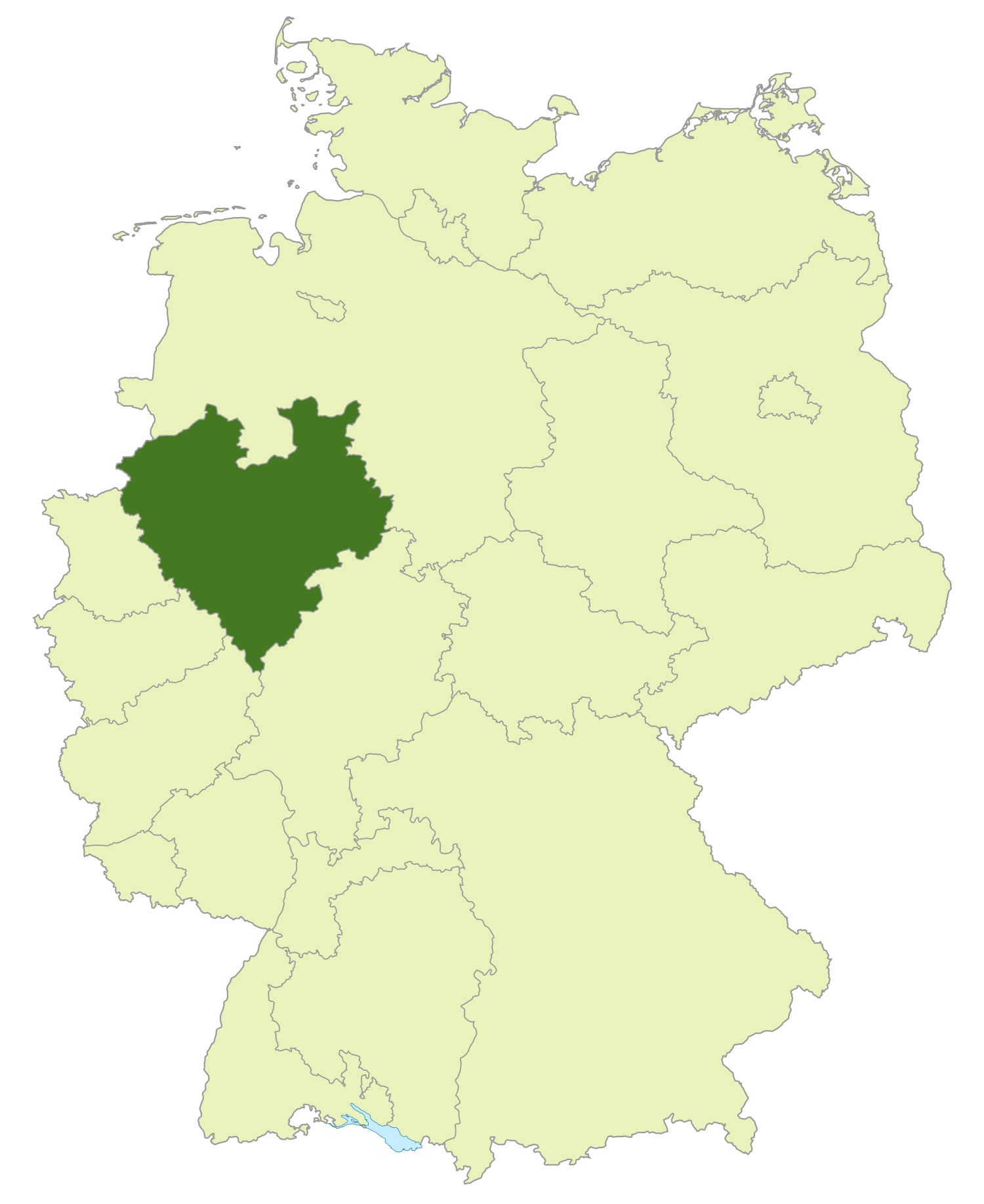
- Founded: 1945
- Country: Germany
- State: North Rhine-Westphalia
- Region: Westphalia
- Confederation: Westphalian Football and Athletics Association
- Divisions: 4
- Number of clubs: 64
- Level on pyramid: Level 7
- Promotion to: Westfalenliga (2 divisions)
- Relegation to: Bezirksliga (12 divisions)
- Current champions: Group 1: VfL Theesen; Group 2: RSV Meinerzhagen; Group 3: BSV Schüren; Group 4: Borussia Emsdetten (2017–18)

The Landesliga Westfalen is a German amateur football division administered by the Westphalian Football and Athletics Association, one of the 21 German state football associations. Being the third level of the Westphalian state association, the Landesliga is currently a level seven division of the German football league system.

== History ==
The Landesliga was introduced in September 1945 under the name of 1. Division West as successor to the defunct Gauliga Westfalen. The first season started in February 1946 in an eastern and a western division separated due to geographical considerations. Founding member were those 18 teams that took part in the Gauliga between 1939 and 1944. The first division winners were FC Schalke 04 (western division) and SpVgg Erkenschwick (eastern division). In the early years, the number of divisions varied from one to three; from 1952 the Landesliga was held in five parallel divisions.

Upon its introduction in 1946, the Landesliga was one of the many top level divisions in Germany. During the years, it has become a level seven division in the German football league system. Since 1956 the Landesliga is the feeder league to the Westfalenliga.

== Current format ==
The 2012–13 season was the first after six decades, when the Landesliga format was changed from five to four divisions. The four division winners promote to the Westfalenliga.

== Sources ==
- Vom Kronprinzen bis zur Bundesliga. 1890 bis 1963. Enzyklopädie des deutschen Ligafußballs. Band 1 (in German), publisher: AGON Sportverlag, published: 1996
