= SG Union Solingen =

German football club

- Full name: Sport-Gemeinschaft Union Solingen 97 e.V.
- Founded: 1949
- Dissolved: 1990
- Ground: Stadion am Hermann-Löns-Weg
- Capacity: 15,000
Home colours	Away colours

SG Union Solingen was a German association football club from Solingen, North Rhine-Westphalia.

== History ==
The side can trace its roots back to an earlier Union Solingen club founded in 1897 out of the merger of a number of clubs from the district of Ohligs that would over time include Ohligs FC 06, VfR Ohligs, Walder Ballspielverein, and BV Adler Ohligs. Of the club's predecessor sides only VfR Ohligs would distinguish itself with any time spent in first-division football when they played the 1940–41 season in the Gauliga Niederrhein before being relegated on the heels of last place finish.

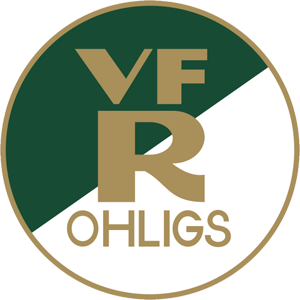
Logo of VfR Ohligs ca. 1930.

In 1949, after World War II, the club was re-formed as Union Ohligs and began play in the 2nd Oberliga West (Gruppe 2). By the early 70s they were playing in the Amateurliga Niederrhein (III). A 1973 merger with VfL Wald Ohligs 1897 led to the formation of a club that played in the Regionalliga West (II) as Ohligs SC Solingen for a single season before being relegated. Renamed SG Union Solingen the next year, the team earned promotion to the 2.Bundesliga-Nord by the middle of the decade. They would stay fourteen seasons in the professional ranks with their best finishes being a fifth and sixth in 1984–85. Solingen returned to the Amateur-Oberliga Nordrhein (III) in 1989: by this time the club was suffering financially and would soon be bankrupt. In 1990 the club was dissolved.

== Former coaches ==
- Manfred Krafft (1986–1987)
- Eckhard Krautzun (1983)
- Erhard Ahmann † (1981–1982)
- Gerhard Prokop † (1980–1981)
- Horst Franz (1977–1980)
- Manfred Krafft (1970–1971)

== Former players ==
- Wolfgang Schäfer
- Dirk Hupe
- Dimitrios Daras
- Fritz Pliska
- Meinolf Schulte
- Werner Lenz
- Ulrich Bittorf
- Demir Hotic
- Horst Kuballa
- Wolfgang Krüger
- Klaus-Dieter Dieckmann
- Helmut Pabst
- Admir Dzombic
- Daniel Jurgeleit
- Horst Stockhausen
- Volker Diergardt
- Manfred Dum
- Franz-Josef Steininger
- Otto Luttrop
- Dieter Kitzmann
- Ray Hudson
- Erwin Kostedde
- Dirk Römer

- Domagoj Balarin

== Honours ==
- Amateurliga Niederrhein champions: 1973, 1975
- Landesliga Niederrhein champions: 1969
