= 1990–91 NOFV-Oberliga =

NOFV-Oberliga
- Season: 1990-91
- Dates: 11 August 1990 – 25 May 1991
- Champions: Hansa Rostock
- Relegated: Stahl Eisenhüttenstadt; 1. FC Magdeburg; FC Berlin; Sachsen Leipzig; Energie Cottbus; Viktoria Frankfurt
- European Cup: Hansa Rostock
- Cup Winners Cup: Stahl Eisenhüttenstadt
- UEFA Cup: Rot-Weiß Erfurt; Chemie Halle
- Matches played: 182
- Goals scored: 459 (2.52 per match)
- Top goalscorer: Torsten Gütschow (20)
- Biggest home win: Dynamo Dresden 7–0 Sachsen Leipzig (20 October 1990)
- Biggest away win: 1. FC Magdeburg 0–4 Stahl Eisenhüttenstadt (2 March 1991)
- Average attendance: 4,779

The 1990–91 season of the former DDR-Oberliga, renamed NOFV-Oberliga for this season, was the last season of the top East German league.

After the season, all East German leagues were dissolved and their teams placed in the German football league system. The top two teams joined the Bundesliga, while those ranked third through sixth went to the 2. Bundesliga. The bottom two teams remained in the NOFV-Oberliga, which absorbed all but the relegated teams of the former East German second tier DDR-Liga (also renamed NOFV-Liga) and joined the German league system at the third tier. The seventh through twelfth placed teams were drawn into a playoff with the two NOFV-Liga group champions for two additional 2. Bundesliga places, with unsuccessful teams also remaining in the NOFV-Oberliga.

The competition was contested by 14 teams. Hansa Rostock won the championship and Dynamo Dresden came in second, thus claiming the other available qualification for the Bundesliga. A total of 8 Eastern teams remained professional into both two national German championships.

Location of teams in NOFV-Oberliga 1990–91

== League standings ==
Pos	Team	Pld	W	D	L	GF	GA	GD	Pts	Qualification
1	F.C. Hansa Rostock (C)	26	13	9	4	44	25	+19	35	Qualification to Bundesliga and European Cup first round
2	1. FC Dynamo Dresden	26	12	8	6	48	28	+20	32	Qualification to Bundesliga; banned from European competition (Note: Dynamo Dresden was banned from European football for two years due to rioting in the 1990–91 European Cup quarterfinals. The two UEFA Cup positions were passed to the third- and fourth-placed teams.)
3	FC Rot-Weiß Erfurt	26	11	9	6	30	26	+4	31	Qualification to 2. Bundesliga and UEFA Cup first round
4	Hallescher FC Chemie	26	10	9	7	40	31	+9	29	Qualification to 2. Bundesliga and UEFA Cup first round
5	Chemnitzer FC	26	9	11	6	24	23	+1	29	Qualification to 2. Bundesliga
6	FC Carl Zeiss Jena	26	12	4	10	41	36	+5	28	Qualification to 2. Bundesliga
7	1. FC Lokomotive Leipzig	26	10	8	8	37	33	+4	28	Qualification to 2. Bundesliga playoffs
8	BSV Stahl Brandenburg	26	9	9	8	34	31	+3	27	Qualification to 2. Bundesliga playoffs
9	Eisenhüttenstädter FC Stahl	26	7	12	7	29	25	+4	26	Qualification to 2. Bundesliga playoffs and Cup Winners' Cup first round (Note: As 1990–91 NOFV-Pokal champions Hansa Rostock qualified for the European Cup through league position, their position in the Cup Winners' Cup passed to Stahl Eisenhüttenstadt as runners-up.)
10	1. FC Magdeburg	26	9	8	9	34	32	+2	26	Qualification to 2. Bundesliga playoffs
11	FC Berlin	26	7	8	11	25	39	−14	22	Qualification to 2. Bundesliga playoffs
12	FC Sachsen Leipzig	26	6	10	10	23	38	−15	22	Qualification to 2. Bundesliga playoffs
13	FC Energie Cottbus	26	3	10	13	21	38	−17	16	Qualification to NOFV-Oberliga
14	FC Viktoria 91 Frankfurt	26	4	5	17	29	54	−25	13	Qualification to NOFV-Oberliga

Source: RSSSF
(C) Champions

== Results ==
Home \ Away	BER	CHE	CZJ	DRE	EFS	ECO	HFC	HRO	LOK	MAG	RWE	SLE	STB	VFO
FC Berlin		2–1	0–1	1–4	1–1	1–2	0–0	0–3	1–0	0–0	0–0	1–1	1–0	2–1
Chemnitzer FC	1–0		1–1	0–0	3–0	1–1	1–1	0–2	2–1	0–2	2–0	0–0	1–0	2–0
Carl Zeiss Jena	4–0	1–2		3–2	2–1	2–0	0–2	0–3	3–1	2–0	0–0	1–0	1–1	4–1
Dynamo Dresden	4–1	1–1	2–0		3–3	1–1	3–1	0–0	2–0	1–0	3–0	7–0	1–0	5–0
Eisenhüttenstädter Stahl	0–0	2–1	3–2	0–0		2–1	2–4	0–0	3–0	0–0	0–0	3–0	0–0	3–0
Energie Cottbus	0–1	0–2	0–2	1–1	0–0		1–0	1–1	1–1	0–0	0–1	4–1	1–1	0–1
Hallescher FC Chemie	1–0	0–0	3–1	3–1	2–0	1–1		1–1	2–2	2–0	1–2	2–1	0–2	1–1
Hansa Rostock	3–2	1–1	3–1	3–1	1–1	2–0	1–1		1–4	2–0	0–1	2–1	2–0	2–0
Lokomotive Leipzig	2–2	3–0	2–0	1–2	0–0	3–1	0–3	3–2		2–0	2–0	1–0	2–0	4–3
1. FC Magdeburg	3–3	4–0	4–3	3–1	0–4	5–1	2–0	2–1	1–1		1–2	0–0	1–0	1–0
Rot-Weiß Erfurt	4–0	0–0	1–1	0–0	2–0	3–1	3–2	1–1	1–1	1–0		0–1	2–1	2–1
Sachsen Leipzig	1–4	0–0	– (Note: The match between Sachsen Leipzig and Carl Zeiss Jena (originally finished 0–1; played in the 6th round), was awarded with 2–0 points and 3–0 goals for Jena, the game was stopped in the 83rd minute due to spectator riots (Leipzig).)	1–0	1–0	1–0	1–3	1–1	0–0	1–1	2–2		3–3	3–0
Stahl Brandenburg	1–0	1–1	3–2	4–1	2–1	2–1	2–1	2–3	1–1	2–2	2–1	0–0		4–2
Viktoria Frankfurt (Oder)	1–2	0–1	1–2	1–2	0–0	2–2	3–3	1–3	2–0	3–2	4–1	1–3	0–0	

Legend: Blue = home team win; Yellow = draw; Red = away team win.

== Top goalscorers ==
	Player	Club	Goals
1.	(Germany) Torsten Gütschow	SG Dynamo Dresden	20
2.	(Germany) Lutz Schülbe	HFC Chemie	13
3.	(Germany) Henri Fuchs	FC Hansa Rostock	11
4.	(Germany) Heiko Laeßig	1. FC Magdeburg	10

== 2. Bundesliga play-off ==
The 7th through 12th placed clubs were joined by the winners of the two second-tier NOFV-Liga groups, Union Berlin and FSV Zwickau. The teams were drawn into two groups of four, with the group champions qualifying for the 1991–92 2. Bundesliga.

=== Group 1 ===
Pos	Team	Pld	W	D	L	GF	GA	GD	Pts	Qualification	STB	BER	UBE	MAG
1	BSV Stahl Brandenburg	6	4	1	1	9	6	+3	9	Qualification to 2. Bundesliga	—	0–0	2–1	1–0
2	FC Berlin	6	3	2	1	10	5	+5	8	Qualification to NOFV-Oberliga	3–1	—	2–0	0–0
3	1. FC Union Berlin	6	2	1	3	5	7	−2	5	Qualification to NOFV-Oberliga	0–2	1–0	—	2–0
4	1. FC Magdeburg	6	0	2	4	6	12	−6	2	Qualification to NOFV-Oberliga	2–3	3–5	1–1	—

Source: RSSSF

=== Group 2 ===
Pos	Team	Pld	W	D	L	GF	GA	GD	Pts	Qualification	LOK	STE	ZWI	SLE
1	1. FC Lokomotive Leipzig	6	4	2	0	11	0	+11	10	Qualification to 2. Bundesliga	—	3–0	0–0	4–0
2	Eisenhüttenstädter FC Stahl	6	3	2	1	8	6	+2	8	Qualification to NOFV-Oberliga	0–0	—	2–2	3–0
3	FSV Zwickau	6	1	2	3	5	9	−4	4	Qualification to NOFV-Oberliga	0–3	0–1	—	1–2
4	FC Sachsen Leipzig	6	1	0	5	4	13	−9	2	Qualification to NOFV-Oberliga	0–1	1–2	1–2	—

Source: RSSSF

== Championship-winning squad ==
Below is the squad of the league champions, Hansa Rostock. They were coached by Uwe Reinders.

Note: Flags indicate national team as defined under FIFA eligibility rules; some limited exceptions apply. Players may hold more than one non-FIFA nationality.

No.	Pos.	Nation	Player
—	GK	(Germany) GER	Daniel Hoffmann
—	GK	(Germany) GER	Jens Kunath
—	DF	(Germany) GER	Bernd Arnholdt
—	DF	(Germany) GER	Gernot Alms
—	DF	(United States) USA	Paul Caligiuri
—	DF	(Germany) GER	Thomas Gansauge
—	DF	(Germany) GER	Uwe Kirchner (to October)
—	DF	(Germany) GER	Heiko März
—	DF	(Germany) GER	Axel Rietentiet
—	DF	(Germany) GER	Frank Rillich
—	DF	(Germany) GER	Jens Wahl
—	DF	(Germany) GER	Mike Werner (from January)

No.	Pos.	Nation	Player
—	MF	(Germany) GER	Andreas Babenderende
—	MF	(Germany) GER	Jens Dowe
—	MF	(Germany) GER	Thomas Finck
—	MF	(Germany) GER	Thomas Lässig
—	MF	(Germany) GER	Sven Oldenburg
—	MF	(Germany) GER	Axel Schulz
—	MF	(Germany) GER	Juri Schlünz
—	MF	(Germany) GER	Hilmar Weilandt
—	FW	(Germany) GER	Henri Fuchs
—	FW	(Germany) GER	Thomas Reif
—	FW	(Germany) GER	Volker Röhrich
—	FW	(Germany) GER	Florian Weichert
