= 1991 NOFV-Pokal final =

East German Cup final
- Event: 1990–91 NOFV-Pokal
Hansa Rostock	Stahl Eisenhüttenstadt
1	0
- Date: 2 June 1991
- Venue: Friedrich-Ludwig-Jahn-Sportpark, Berlin
- Referee: Klaus Scheurell (Wusterhausen/Dosse)
- Attendance: 4,800

The 1991 NOFV-Pokal final decided the winner of the 1990–91 NOFV-Pokal, the 40th season of East Germany's premier knockout football cup competition. It was played on 2 June 1991 at the Friedrich-Ludwig-Jahn-Sportpark in Berlin. Hansa Rostock won the match 1–0 against Stahl Eisenhüttenstadt for their 1st title. This was the final East German cup final, as East and West Germany had reunified, along with their respective football associations.

== Route to the final ==
The NOFV-Pokal began with 61 teams in a single-elimination knockout cup competition. There were a total of five rounds leading up to the final. Teams were drawn against each other, and the winner after 90 minutes would advance. If still tied, extra time, and if necessary penalties were used to determine the winner.

Note: In all results below, the score of the finalist is given first (H: home; A: away).

Hansa Rostock		Round	Stahl Eisenhüttenstadt
Opponent	Result	1990–91 NOFV-Pokal	Opponent	Result
Viktoria Templin (A)	5–1	Round 1	Stahl Riesa (A)	6–2
Hallescher FC Chemie (H)	2–0	Round 2	Chemie Guben (H)	1–0
Stahl Thale (H)	2–0	Round of 16	1. FC Magdeburg (H)	4–0
Rot-Weiß Erfurt (H)	1–0	Quarter-finals	Carl Zeiss Jena (H)	1–0
Lokomotive Leipzig (A)	1–1 (a.e.t.) (3–1 p)	Semi-finals	Union Berlin (H)	2–0

== Match ==
=== Details ===
2 June 1991

Hansa Rostock	1–0	Stahl Eisenhüttenstadt
Wahl 43'	Report

Friedrich-Ludwig-Jahn-Sportpark, Berlin
Attendance: 4,800
Referee: Klaus Scheurell (Wusterhausen/Dosse)

Hansa Rostock	Stahl Eisenhüttenstadt

GK	1	(Germany) Daniel Hoffmann
CB		(United States) Paul Caligiuri
CB		(Germany) Gernot Alms
CB		(Germany) Mike Werner
RM		(Germany) Heiko März
CM		(Germany) Hilmar Weilandt	(substituted off) 74'
CM		(Germany) Jens Wahl
LM		(Germany) Jens Dowe
RW		(Germany) Florian Weichert
CF		(Germany) Volker Röhrich
LW		(Germany) Henri Fuchs	(substituted off) 87'
Substitutes:
MF		(Germany) Frank Rillich	(substituted in) 74'
MF		(Germany) Juri Schlünz	(substituted in) 87'
Manager:
(Germany) Uwe Reinders

GK	1	(Germany) Bodo Rudwaleit
RB		(Germany) Axel Wittke
CB		(Germany) Olaf Backasch
CB		(Germany) Thomas Kluge
LB		(Germany) Frank Bartz
RM		(Germany) Ralf Rambow
CM		(Germany) Olaf Schnürer
CM		(Germany) Karsten Schulz	(substituted off) 66'
LM		(Germany) Steffen Menze
CF		(Germany) Timo Löhnert
CF		(Socialist Federal Republic of Yugoslavia) Milan Milanović	(substituted off) 60'
Substitutes:
MF		(Germany) Heiko Lahn	(substituted in) 66'
FW		(Germany) Torsten Richert	(substituted in) 60'
Manager:
(Germany) Karl Trautmann
