= East Germany–West Germany football rivalry =

Rivalry between the football teams of East and West Germany

- Location: Europe (UEFA)
- Teams: East Germany West Germany Clubs from each country

The rivalry between football teams from East Germany and West Germany lasted from 1949 to 1990.

Clubs from the two countries met at official level in both national team and club competitions like the FIFA World Cup and European Cup. While the West Germany national team received strong support in East Germany, with supporters from the East often travelling to away matches of the West German team in Eastern Europe, encounters between teams from the East and West in European Cup competitions were often hard-fought.

East Germany's 1–0 victory over West Germany in the 1974 FIFA World Cup was the only game between the two national teams. Bayer 05 Uerdingen's 1986 victory over Dynamo Dresden was dubbed the Miracle of the Grotenburg.

== Political background ==
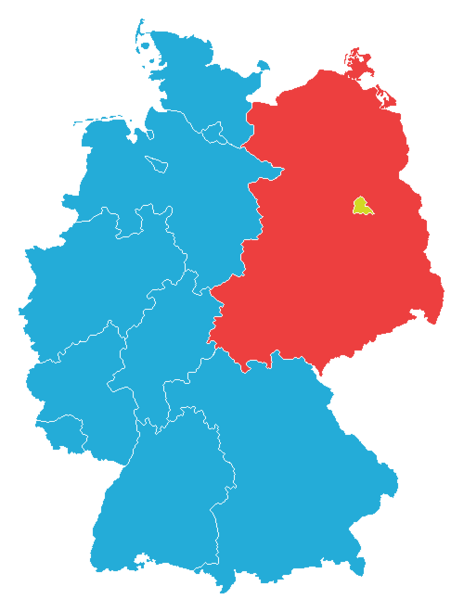
Map showing the division between West Germany (in blue) and East Germany (in red) until 1990, with West Berlin in lime.

After the end of the Second World War four occupation zones existed in Allied-occupied Germany. The British, French and US zones gradually merged to form West Germany, the Federal Republic of Germany, on 23 May 1949. In the Soviet occupation zone East Germany, the German Democratic Republic, was formed on 7 October 1949. Separated throughout the Cold War, the German Democratic Republic merged into the Federal Republic of Germany on 3 October 1990, referred to as the German reunification.

Football games between teams from the two countries were sometimes referred to as class struggle between the capitalist West and the communist East, but more often just seen as a "fight between brothers" or an inner-German duel.

== Overview ==
=== Club football ===
When football resumed in occupied post-Second World War Germany attempts were made to stage a unified national championship that would include teams from all four occupation zones, including the Soviet zone. A 1947 edition of the German football championship, the first since 1944, was planned and scheduled to include one team from the Soviet zone but eventually cancelled. In the following season the 1948 German football championship was held and the Soviet zone champions SG Planitz, winner of the 1948 Ostzonenmeisterschaft, had been invited but was refused permission to travel by the occupation authorities.

Soviet occupation zone clubs did not participate in any of the following German championships but clubs from West and East Berlin still participated in a unified league, the Stadtliga Berlin, until the end of the 1949–50 season. Union Oberschöneweide, a club from the eastern part of the city, qualified for the 1950 German football championship but was not permitted to travel to the west and shortly after the East Berlin clubs withdrew from the league to join the DDR-Oberliga instead.

Friendlies between clubs from the East and West were still common in the 1950s but almost disappeared in the decades after. Arguably the most anticipated of those was the game between 1. FC Kaiserslautern, West German champions in 1951 and 1953 and runners-up in 1954 and 1955, and Wismut Karl-Marx-Stadt, the current East German champions, on 6 October 1956. The game between the two clubs had received 400,000 orders for tickets and 100,000 watched the game in the Zentralstadion at Leipzig, seeing a 5–3 victory for Kaiserslautern. The two teams played a return match the following year which Kaiserslautern also won.

With the introduction of the European Cup in 1955–56 the West German champions participated in this competition while the East German champions entered from 1957–58 onward. While the possibility existed that teams from the two Germanys could be drawn against each other, this did not happen until the 1973–74 edition when Dynamo Dresden met FC Bayern Munich in the second round and lost 7–6 on aggregate. After the draw for the second round anticipation for the first ever-encounter of the two champions and the "true German championship". The first leg in Munich was not a sell-out but the return leg in Dresden saw 300,000 ticket requests.

In the same season 1. FC Lokomotive Leipzig eliminated Fortuna Düsseldorf in the third round of the UEFA Cup and from there encounters between clubs from the East and West become more common in UEFA club competitions. Bayern Munich and 1. FC Magdeburg were unable to arrange dates for an all-German European Super Cup meeting after the former had won the 1973–74 European Cup and the latter the 1973–74 European Cup Winners' Cup, each a maiden triumph in that competition for their respective territories, but the luck of the draw brought them together in the 1974–75 European Cup in any case; Bayern won both legs of the tie and went on to defend their title.

Apart from these encounters, the 1985–86 European Cup Winners' Cup third round-second leg game between Bayer 05 Uerdingen and Dynamo Dresden is still well-remembered. Dresden had won the first leg 2–0 at home and led 3–1 at half time in Uerdingen when the latter scored six unanswered goals to win the tie 7–5 on aggregate, a game often dubbed the Miracle of the Grotenburg, named after Uerdingen's stadium. The game was voted as the greatest football match of all time by German magazine 11 Freunde. Another high-profile encounter was the return leg of the European Cup tie in 1988 between SV Werder Bremen and Berliner FC Dynamo in which the latter had won the first leg 2–0 but lost 5–0 in Bremen.

In 1990, the year of reunification, two commemorative challenge matches were held between the cup winners and the champions of the previous season in the two territories. Both Deutschland-Cup fixtures featured Dynamo Dresden and were hosted at their Rudolf-Harbig-Stadion. In August 1990 they defeated DFB-Pokal holders Kaiserslautern on penalties after a 1–1 draw, and in November of that year they overcame reigning Bundesliga champions Bayern Munich 1–0. The subsequent 1991 DFB-Supercup featured the champions and Cup winners from the East and West.

The true test of the comparative strength of East German clubs would be their introduction into the West German league, although by that time most of the top players (Andreas Thom, Matthias Sammer, Ulf Kirsten, Olaf Marschall, Dirk Schuster, Thomas Doll) had already taken the opportunity to transfer to clubs elsewhere. Hansa Rostock, winners of both the 1990–91 NOFV-Oberliga and the 1991 NOFV-Pokal Final, gained entry to the temporarily expanded top tier along with Dynamo Dresden, with other clubs filling into lower divisions. Rostock's stay was brief (although they were briefly top of the table and had a part to play in the destination of the title, and would enjoy a ten-year stay from 1995), while Dresden only lasted four seasons. VfB Leipzig, also known as 1. FC Lokomotive Leipzig, spent a single campaign in the Bundesliga while Energie Cottbus, not one of the major teams in the East Germany era, twice claimed a place at the top table in the 2000s and Union Berlin were runners-up in the 2001 DFB-Pokal Final but aside from those modest achievements, no GDR club made any impact in the reunified German football system (although based in the east of the country, RB Leipzig did not exist until 2009).

=== International ===
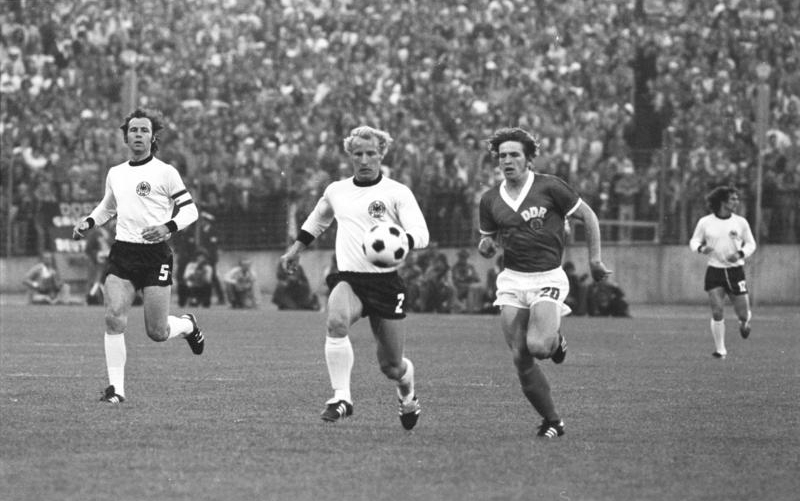
Match at the 1974 World Cup. L–R: West German players Franz Beckenbauer, Berti Vogts and in the background Wolfgang Overath, and East Germany's striker Martin Hoffmann

On national team level, West Germany played its first post-war international on 22 November 1950 against Switzerland in Stuttgart, while East Germany played their first game against Poland on 21 September 1952 in Warsaw and its 293rd and last on 12 September 1990 against Belgium in Brussels.

The two sides met just once on senior national team level, on 22 June 1974, in a group game of the 1974 FIFA World Cup, held in West Germany. The game in Hamburg, in front of 62,000, was won 1–0 by East Germany courtesy of a goal by Jürgen Sparwasser. East Germany was eliminated in second group stage while West Germany won the World Cup. For the East, 1974 was the only participation while the West won the 1954 and 1990 editions as well. The two countries never met again at this level despite West Germany frequently requesting a rematch but the East declining, despite strong interest from East German players, coaches and fans.

With the German reunification, a special game between the two former countries was planned for 21 November 1990 in Leipzig but this was cancelled after a fatal shooting of a supporter at a game between Sachsen Leipzig and Berliner FC Dynamo by the police on 3 November. West and East Germany had been drawn with each other for the qualifying of the 1992 European Championship but the latter withdrew because of the reunification.

At Olympic Games level, the East German and West German Olympic teams first encountered each other in the qualifying competition for the 1964 Summer Olympics football tournament where East Germany won its home game 3–0 while West Germany won theirs 2–1, resulting in the East advancing to the games where they won a bronze medal. The two met again at the 1972 Summer Olympics, held in Munich, West Germany, with East Germany winning this game as well, 3–2, and eventually winning another bronze medal. While the East German team consisted of top-level players from the DDR-Oberliga, the West German team was an amateur side. The East German team would also win the gold medal in 1976 and a silver medal in the following games in 1980.

== Aftermath ==
During the era of the divided Germany, at times a strong but distant friendship existed between clubs and supporters in either territory; however this has changed since German reunification. In the divided Berlin the two most popular clubs on either side, Hertha BSC and 1. FC Union Berlin often saw support banners for the other in their stadiums. After the fall of the Berlin Wall, this friendship continued for a time but eventually has turned into a strong rivalry and dislike between the two clubs and their supporters.

== European club competitions ==
The encounters between East and West German clubs in the European Cup competitions are listed below.

=== Key ===
| East German club | West German club |

=== European Cup ===
On four occasions East and West German clubs were drawn against each other in the European Cup. All four encounters were won by the West German team and on three of those occasions, in 1973–74, 1974–75 and 1982–83 the winners would go on to win the competition.

| Season | Round | Team 1 | Aggregate score | Team 2 | 1st leg | 2nd leg |
|---|---|---|---|---|---|---|
| 1973–74 | Second round | FC Bayern Munich | 7–6 | Dynamo Dresden | 4–3 | 3–3 |
| 1974–75 | Second round | FC Bayern Munich | 5–3 | 1. FC Magdeburg | 3–2 | 2–1 |
| 1982–83 | First round | Berliner FC Dynamo | 1–3 | Hamburger SV | 1–1 | 0–2 |
| 1988–89 | First round | Berliner FC Dynamo | 3–5 | SV Werder Bremen | 3–0 | 0–5 |

=== European Cup Winners' Cup ===
The European Cup Winners' Cup saw just one encounter between clubs from the two countries which the West German side won.

| Season | Round | Team 1 | Aggregate score | Team 2 | 1st leg | 2nd leg |
|---|---|---|---|---|---|---|
| 1985–86 | Quarter-finals | Dynamo Dresden | 5–7 | Bayer 05 Uerdingen | 2–0 | 3–7 |

=== UEFA Cup ===
Teams from the two countries met twelve times in the UEFA Cup with the East German clubs winning the encounters three times, 1. FC Lokomotive Leipzig being the successful side on two of those occasions and 1. FC Magdeburg winning the other. The other nine times West German clubs advanced.

| Season | Round | Team 1 | Aggregate score | Team 2 | 1st leg | 2nd leg |
|---|---|---|---|---|---|---|
| 1973–74 | Third round | Fortuna Düsseldorf | 2–4 | 1. FC Lokomotive Leipzig | 2–1 | 0–3 |
| 1974–75 | Third round | Hamburger SV | 6–3 | Dynamo Dresden | 4–1 | 2–2 |
| 1977–78 | Second round | 1. FC Magdeburg | 7–3 | FC Schalke 04 | 4–2 | 3–1 |
| 1978–79 | Second round | FC Carl Zeiss Jena | 0–3 | MSV Duisburg | 0–0 | 0–3 aet |
| 1979–80 | Second round | Dynamo Dresden | 1–1 | VfB Stuttgart | 1–1 | 0–0 |
| 1980–81 | Second round | VfB Stuttgart | 7–2 | FC Vorwärts Frankfurt | 5–1 | 2–1 |
| 1981–82 | First round | 1. FC Magdeburg | 3–3 | Borussia Mönchengladbach | 3–1 | 0–2 |
| 1982–83 | First round | FC Vorwärts Frankfurt | 3–3 | SV Werder Bremen | 1–3 | 2–0 |
| 1983–84 | Second round | 1. FC Lokomotive Leipzig | 2–1 | SV Werder Bremen | 1–0 | 1–1 |
| 1986–87 | First round | Bayer 05 Uerdingen | 7–0 | FC Carl Zeiss Jena | 3–0 | 4–0 |
| 1988–89 | Semi-finals | VfB Stuttgart | 2–1 | Dynamo Dresden | 1–0 | 1–1 |
| 1990–91 | First round | Borussia Dortmund | 4–0 | Chemnitzer FC | 2–0 | 2–0 |
