= Mike Werner =

German footballer

Personal information
- Date of birth: 13 February 1971 (age 55)
- Place of birth: Spremberg, Bezirk Cottbus, East Germany (present-day Brandenburg, Germany)
- Height: 1.82 m (6 ft 0 in)
- Position: Defender

Youth career
- –1984: BSG Energie Cottbus
- 1984–1988: FC Vorwärts Frankfurt

Senior career*
Years	Team	Apps	(Gls)
1988–1989	FC Vorwärts Frankfurt II		
1988–1989	FC Vorwärts Frankfurt		
1989–1991	BSG Motor Eberswalde		
1991–1996	Hansa Rostock	102	(2)
2001–2003	TSG Neustrelitz		
2003–2005	PSV Ribnitz-Damgarten		
- * Club domestic league appearances and goals

Mike Werner (born 13 February 1971) is a German former professional footballer who played as a defender.

== Career ==
Werner began playing football for BSG Energie Cottbus. He was then allowed to join the youth department of the army-sponsored football club FC Vorwärts Frankfurt in 1984.

Werner attended a sports school in Frankfurt an der Oder and played for the youth teams of FC Vorwärts Frankfurt. He eventually made his debut for the first team of FC Vorwärts Frankfurt in the DDR-Oberliga as a 17-year-old away against 1. FC Magdeburg on the 20th matchday of the 1987–88 DDR-Oberliga 6 April 1988. He was then listed with the reserve team FC Vorwärts Frankfurt II in the second-tier DDR-Liga for the 1988-89 season.

At the sports school in Frankfurt an der Oder, it was all about football. Werner has described that everything, everyday life and school, was tailored to football. But Werner claims that he was a "wild guy". He was into motorcycles and leather jackets. Werner claims that the army-officers at FC Vorwärts Frankfurt eventually had enough of him, after a teacher had found a scribbling he had made, with notes such as "Udo Lindenberg" and "The wall must go". Werner was subsequently demoted to second-grade enterprise sports community BSG Motor Eberswalde in 1989.

Werner was eventually invited to Hansa Rostock during the winter break 1990–1991. Then Hansa Rostock coach Uwe Reinders wanted to see him for a trial session. Werner then joined the team of Hansa Rostock for the second half of the 1990–91 season. Werner was not used as a central defender at Hansa Rostock, but as a marker. He has explained that his job at the pitch was not to ”shape football”, but "solely to destroy the opponent's game", by "following the opposing striker everywhere". Werner neither spared himself, nor the opponent. He played with number 21 at Hansa Rostock. Werner ultimately won the 1990–91 NOFV-Oberliga and the 1990–91 NOFV-Pokal and captured the double with Hansa Rostock in 1991.

Hansa Rostock joined the Bundesliga after German re-unification. Werner made only one appearance for Hansa Rostock in the 1991-92 Bundesliga, but was part of a team that won victories against opponents such as Bayern Munich and Borussia Dortmund. Hansa Rostock was eventually relegated to the 2. Bundesliga after the 1991–92 season. Werner became regular player for Hansa Rostock in the 1991-92 2. Bundesliga. He eventually won promotion back to the Bundesliga with Hansa Rostock in the 1994–95 season. After promotion to the Bundesliga with Hansa Rostock, Werner fulfilled a great personal dream, by finally buying a Harley-Davidson motorcycle. However, Werner unfortunately suffered a cruciate ligament tear in a duel with Boussia Dortmund midfielder Knut Reinhardt on the third matchday of the 1995-96 Bundesliga. He hunderwent several operations, but never made it back. Werner subsequently ended his professional career in 1996.

Werner later continued in amateur football. He first played for TSV Graal-Müritz. He then joined TSV Neustrelitz in the sixth tier Verbandsliga Mecklenburg-Vorpommern in 2001. TSG Neustrelitz was promoted to NOFV-Oberliga Nord in 2002. He played 19 matches for TSG Neustrelitz in the 2002–03 NOFV-Oberliga Nord. Werner left TSG Neustreliz for PSV Ribnitz-Damgarten in 2003. Werner played for PSV Ribnitz-Damgarten until retiring as a player in May 2005. Werner then took over as coach of PSV Ribnitz-Damgarten in the Bezirksklasse. The team of PSV Ribnitz-Damgarten eventually won promotion to the Landesliga Mecklenburg-Vorpommern under Werner.

Werner returned to Hansa Rostock in June 2010 as an assistant to C-Junior coach Juri Schlünz. He then joined TSV Graal-Müritz as a coach in the Landesliga Mecklenburg-Vorpommern during the winter of 2013. He then served B-Junior coach at TSV Graal-Müritz. Werner joined FC Pommern Stralsund as assistant coach in July 2017. He has since also served as interim coach of PSV Ribnitz-Damgarten in the Landesklasse Mecklenburg-Vorpommern in 2020.

== Miscellaneous ==
Werner was known for his eye-catching haircut with mullet and moustache. Former Hansa Rostock youth talent Marten Laciny, who saw Hansa Rostock win promotion to the Bundesliga in 1995 at the Ostseestadion as a twelve-year-old, told in an interview with German football magazine 11 Freunde how he once watched Stefan Beinlich, Rocco Milde and Steffen Baumgart shoot down Hannover 96, with "Werner's hair flying at the back of the defence".

Werner had been forced to keep his hair short at army club FC Vorwärts Frankfurt, and used the transfer to BSG Motor Eberswalde as an opportunity to finally grow his hair. When finally arriving at Hansa Rostock during the winter 1991, he already had a "mighty mullet", in his own words. Werner had originally wanted full long hair. But Hansa Rostock coach Uwe Reinders had allegedly told him: "If you ever miss a header because your hair is in your face, you'll never play again." So Werner cut his hair short in the front. Werner claims that Reinders actually didn't care at all about the hair at first. But later, when the team, joined the Bundesliga, did Reinders tease Werner bout the hair. Reinders is said to have once said: "If you don't cut your hair, you don't play", but Werner did not care.

Werner immediately caused controversy at Hansa Rostock. Between two matches during an indoor tournament in Bremen, shortly after starting at Hansa Rostock, he accepted a vodka from a visitor. The visitor turned out to be a journalist from West German tabloid Bild. The next day, Bild wrote, "Hansa players drink vodka at the indoor tournament!" in big letters.

== Honours ==
Hansa Rostock

- East German Champion: 1990–91
- NOFV-Pokal: 1990–91
- 2. Bundesliga: 1994–95

TSG Neustrelitz

- Verbandsliga Mecklenburg-Vorpommern: 2001–02
