= Joaquín Montañés =

Spanish footballer

Personal information
- Full name: Joaquín Montañés
- Date of birth: 15 August 1953 (age 73)
- Place of birth: Talavera de la Reina, Spain
- Height: 1.73 m (5 ft 8 in)
- Position: Defender

Youth career
- Eschweiler SG: 1965–1967
- Stolberger SV: 1967–1972

Senior career*
Years	Team	Apps	(Gls)
1972–1989	Alemannia Aachen	541	(11)
1989–1993	Borussia Freialdenhoven		

Managerial career
- 1989–1993: Borussia Freialdenhoven
- 1993–1997: FSV Geilenkirchen-Hünshoven
- 1997–2000: SuS Herzogenrath
- 2006: SC 07/86 Setterich
- 2006–2007: Rot-Weiß Frelenberg
- * Club domestic league appearances and goals

Joaquín "Jo" Montañés (born 15 August 1953 in Talavera de la Reina) is a retired Spanish footballer who spent his entire professional career with German 2. Bundesliga club Alemannia Aachen.

== Career ==
Montañés, born in Talavera de la Reina, Spain in 1953, moved to Germany with his parents when he was 14 years old.

Montañés joined Aachen in 1972 after having played for the youth teams of Eschweiler SG and Stolberger SV. Aachen was playing in the tier two Regionalliga West at the time, having been relegated from the Bundesliga at the end of the 1969–70 season. He would play for the club in the Regionalliga until 1974, in the new 2. Bundesliga Nord until 1981 and in the single-division 2. Bundesliga, making 541 appearances for the club all up. Montañés' 477 2. Bundesliga games is the second-most for any player in the league and the most played for an individual club.

Montañés retired from professional football to work as a coach of local amateur teams while Alemannia Aachen, in its first season without him, suffered relegation from the 2. Bundesliga.
