= Thomas Gansauge =

German footballer

- Thomas Gansauge in 1990

Personal information
- Date of birth: 4 June 1970 (age 56)
- Place of birth: Bergen auf Rügen, East Germany
- Height: 1.84 m (6 ft 0 in)
- Position: Defender

Senior career*
| Years | Team | Apps | (Gls) |
| 1986–1989 | Hansa Rostock II | 2 | (0) |
| 1989–1991 | Hansa Rostock | 1 | (0) |
| 1989–1990 | → BSG Motor Stralsund | 14 | (1) |
| 1991–1994 | Rasensport Elmshorn | | |
| 1994–1995 | SV Lurup | | |
| 1995–1996 | PSV Rostock | | |
| 1996–1999 | Hansa Rostock | 71 | (0) |
| 2000–2001 | Arminia Bielefeld | 20 | (1) |
| 2001–2004 | Rot-Weiß Erfurt | 68 | (3) |
| Total | | 176 | (5) |
- * Club domestic league appearances and goals

Thomas Gansauge (born 4 June 1970) is a German former professional footballer who played as a defender. Gansauge started his career at Hansa Rostock, going on to make 81 appearances in the Bundesliga with Hansa Rostock and Arminia Bielefeld.

== Club career ==
Born in Bergen auf Rügen, Gansauge grew up in Bergen auf Rügen and Rostock and started his career at Hansa Rostock. After playing for Hansa Rostock II and a spell on loan at BSG Motor Stralsund, he made his debut for Hansa Rostock on 5 September 1990, in a 3–0 win in the DDR-Oberliga away at FC Berlin. He left Hansa Rostock in 1991, playing for Rasensport Elmshorn, SV Lurup and PSV Rostock before rejoining Hansa Rostock in 1996. He made 71 Bundesliga appearances for Hansa Rostock before leaving the club in 1999 for Arminia Bielefeld. He made 10 Bundesliga appearances as Bielefeld were relegated to the 2. Bundesliga. He joined Rot-Weiß Erfurt in 2001 before retiring in 2004.

== Personal life ==
Gausange has lived in Chicago since 2005 and runs Schwaben AC as well as the Hansa Soccer Academy.
