= Daniel Hoffmann =

German footballer (born 1971)

- Hoffmann with Hansa Rostock in 1990

Personal information
- Date of birth: 27 October 1971 (age 55)
- Place of birth: Rostock, East Germany
- Height: 1.87 m (6 ft 2 in)
- Position: Goalkeeper

Team information
- Current team: SC Fürstenfeldbruck (goalkeeper coach)

Senior career*
| Years | Team | Apps | (Gls) |
| 1990–1995 | Hansa Rostock II | | |
| 1990–1995 | Hansa Rostock | 143 | (0) |
| 1996–1997 | VfB Leipzig | 23 | (0) |
| 1997–2000 | 1860 Munich | 40 | (0) |
| 2000–2001 | Kocaelispor | 3 | (0) |
| 2001–2003 | Sturm Graz | 9 | (0) |
| 2004 | SC Paderborn | 10 | (0) |
| 2004 | SC Paderborn II | | |
| 2004–2005 | SV Warnemünde | | |

International career
| 1992 | Germany U-21 | 1 | (0) |

Managerial career
- 2008–2010: TSV Grafing
- 2013–: SC Fürstenfeldbruck (goalkeeper coach)
- * Club domestic league appearances and goals

Daniel Hoffmann (born 27 October 1971 in Rostock, East Germany) is a German football coach and a former player. He played in the Bundesliga (five seasons with Hansa Rostock and 1860 Munich, totalling 70 games), and also in Turkey and Austria.

== Honours ==
Hansa Rostock

- NOFV-Oberliga (East German Championship): 1990–91
- NOFV-Pokal (East German Cup): 1990–91
