= Karl Trautmann =

German footballer (born 1932)

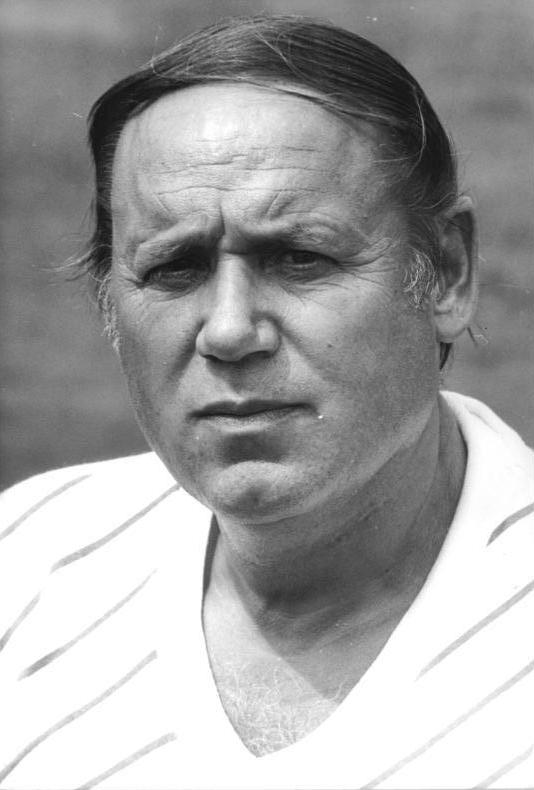
Trautmann in 1988

Karl Trautmann (born 26 April 1932) is a German former football manager and player.

== Career ==
Trautmann was born in Erfurt. He helped East German side 1. FC Frankfurt reach the final of the 1976 FDGB-Pokal and helped East German side Eisenhüttenstädter FC Stahl reach the final of the 1991 FDGB-Pokal. In 1986, he was appointed manager of East German side Hallescher FC, and has been regarded as one of the club's most successful managers.
