= 1991–92 2. Bundesliga =

18th season of the second-tier football league in Germany

2. Bundesliga
- Season: 1991–92
- Champions: Nord: Bayer 05 Uerdingen; Süd: 1. FC Saarbrücken
- Promoted: Nord: Bayer 05 Uerdingen; Süd: 1. FC Saarbrücken
- Relegated: Nord: Blau-Weiß 90 Berlin; Stahl Brandenburg; Süd: TSV 1860 Munich; Hallescher FC; FC Rot-Weiß Erfurt
- Cup Winners' Cup: Hannover 96
- Top goalscorer: Nord: Radek Drulák (21 goals); Süd: Michael Preetz (16 goals)

The 1991–92 2. Bundesliga season was the eighteenth season of the 2. Bundesliga, the second tier of the German football league system. It was the first season in which the league contained clubs from former East Germany.

Bayer 05 Uerdingen and 1. FC Saarbrücken were promoted to the Bundesliga while Blau-Weiß 90 Berlin, BSV Stahl Brandenburg, TSV 1860 Munich, Hallescher FC and FC Rot-Weiß Erfurt were relegated to the Oberliga.

== Format ==
Locations of the participating teams of the 1991-92 season: 2. Bundesliga Nord (blue), 2. Bundesliga Süd (red).

As a result of the assimilation of six teams from the former East German Oberliga, the league was split into two groups - Nord and Süd.

In each area, a normal round robin league (22 games) was firstly completed. After this the leagues were divided in half, forming a championship division and a relegation division which saw a final round of games between the teams (10 games). The two winners of the championship divisions were promoted to the Bundesliga while the two last placed teams in each of the relegation division were relegated. The two third-last teams in each relegation division entered a further round with the runners-up of the Oberliga Nord.

== Nord ==
For the 1991–92 season FC Remscheid was newly promoted to the 2. Bundesliga Nord from the Oberliga while Bayer 05 Uerdingen, Hertha BSC and FC St. Pauli had been relegated to the league from the Bundesliga. BSV Stahl Brandenburg entered the league from the NOFV-Oberliga.

=== League table ===
Championship Group
Pos	Team	Pld	W	D	L	GF	GA	GD	Pts	Promotion or relegation
1	Bayer 05 Uerdingen (C, P)	32	15	9	8	47	29	+18	39	Promotion to Bundesliga
2	VfB Oldenburg	32	12	14	6	56	39	+17	38	
3	Hertha BSC	32	13	9	10	46	41	+5	35	
4	FC St. Pauli	32	13	9	10	40	38	+2	35	
5	Hannover 96	32	10	14	8	34	37	−3	34	Qualification to Cup Winners' Cup first round
6	SV Meppen	32	10	10	12	36	37	−1	30	

(C) Champions; (P) Promoted

Relegation Group
Pos	Team	Pld	W	D	L	GF	GA	GD	Pts	Promotion or relegation
7	Eintracht Braunschweig	32	12	9	11	54	48	+6	33	
8	FC Remscheid	32	8	15	9	39	38	+1	31	
9	VfL Osnabrück	32	10	11	11	45	54	−9	31	
10	Blau-Weiß 90 Berlin (Note: SpVgg Blau-Weiß 1890 Berlin were denied a license and thus relegated.) (R)	32	11	8	13	41	50	−9	30	Relegation to Oberliga
11	Fortuna Köln	32	8	9	15	39	50	−11	25	
12	Stahl Brandenburg (R)	32	8	7	17	37	53	−16	23	Relegation to Oberliga

Source: Bundesliga.de
Rules for classification: 1) points; 2) goal difference; 3) number of goals scored.
(R) Relegated

=== Results ===
==== Matches 1–22 ====
Home \ Away	BWB	BSC	BRA	EBS	H96	FKO	SVM	OLD	OSN	FCR	STP	B05
Blau-Weiß 90 Berlin	—	0–3	3–1	2–1	1–1	2–1	2–0	3–2	2–4	5–2	1–5	1–0
Hertha BSC	1–1	—	3–0	1–1	0–1	3–2	2–0	1–0	1–1	3–2	4–2	0–0
Stahl Brandenburg	1–3	0–1	—	1–4	3–0	2–0	1–0	1–0	1–2	1–3	4–0	0–3
Eintracht Braunschweig	2–0	2–1	3–2	—	1–3	1–1	0–2	4–1	2–2	0–0	3–2	1–1
Hannover 96	2–0	2–2	1–0	1–1	—	0–1	1–1	2–2	2–1	2–0	1–0	1–3
Fortuna Köln	2–1	1–1	2–4	3–3	0–0	—	3–3	1–1	0–1	0–2	1–1	1–2
SV Meppen	2–1	2–1	1–1	2–1	1–1	1–0	—	1–1	2–0	2–2	0–0	0–1
VfB Oldenburg	0–0	4–1	0–0	4–1	3–2	2–1	3–3	—	6–1	2–2	1–1	2–1
VfL Osnabrück	1–1	3–1	1–1	3–0	0–1	4–1	1–3	2–2	—	0–4	0–1	3–1
FC Remscheid	2–0	0–0	3–1	2–1	0–0	1–1	1–1	1–1	0–1	—	0–0	1–1
FC St. Pauli	2–0	1–0	2–2	0–2	0–0	2–0	2–1	3–1	0–0	2–1	—	3–1
Bayer Uerdingen	2–0	1–0	2–1	3–1	1–1	4–0	0–2	0–0	2–1	4–1	2–1	—

Source: DFB
Legend: Blue = home team win; Yellow = draw; Red = away team win.

==== Matches 23–32 ====
===== Championship group =====
Home \ Away	BSC	H96	SVM	OLD	STP	B05
Hertha BSC	—	1–1	3–1	2–2	2–1	0–5
Hannover 96	2–1	—	1–1	1–1	0–2	1–1
SV Meppen	0–1	3–0	—	0–2	0–2	0–1
VfB Oldenburg	1–0	5–0	1–0	—	2–0	1–1
FC St. Pauli	0–3	0–3	1–0	3–2	—	0–0
Bayer Uerdingen	2–3	1–0	0–1	0–1	1–1	—

Source: DFB
Legend: Blue = home team win; Yellow = draw; Red = away team win.

===== Relegation group =====
Home \ Away	BWB	BRA	EBS	FKO	OSN	FCR
Blau-Weiß 90 Berlin	—	2–0	0–2	0–1	1–1	2–2
Stahl Brandenburg	2–2	—	1–0	0–3	0–0	1–1
Eintracht Braunschweig	2–3	3–1	—	1–0	6–1	2–0
Fortuna Köln	0–1	2–1	2–2	—	2–0	1–2
VfL Osnabrück	1–1	3–2	3–1	2–5	—	1–1
FC Remscheid	2–0	0–1	0–0	0–1	1–1	—

Source: DFB
Legend: Blue = home team win; Yellow = draw; Red = away team win.

=== Top scorers ===
The league's top scorers:

Goals	Player	Team
21	(Czech Republic) Radek Drulák	VfB Oldenburg
15	(Germany) Fred Klaus	VfL Osnabrück
15	(Germany) Markus Sailer	FC St. Pauli
13	(Germany) Holger Aden	Eintracht Braunschweig
12	(Germany) Stefan Holze	Eintracht Braunschweig

== Süd ==
For the 1991–92 season TSV 1860 Munich was newly promoted to the 2. Bundesliga Süd from the Oberliga while no club had been relegated to the league from the Bundesliga. Chemnitzer FC, FC Carl Zeiss Jena, VfB Leipzig, Hallescher FC and FC Rot-Weiß Erfurt entered the league from the NOFV-Oberliga.

=== League table ===
Championship Group
Pos	Team	Pld	W	D	L	GF	GA	GD	Pts	Promotion or relegation
1	1. FC Saarbrücken (C, P)	32	15	12	5	52	30	+22	42	Promotion to Bundesliga
2	Waldhof Mannheim	32	12	14	6	44	31	+13	38	
3	SC Freiburg	32	13	11	8	52	41	+11	37	
4	Chemnitzer FC	32	12	12	8	35	50	−15	36	
5	Carl Zeiss Jena	32	12	9	11	39	36	+3	33	
6	FC Homburg	32	10	12	10	41	36	+5	32	

(C) Champions; (P) Promoted

Relegation Group
Pos	Team	Pld	W	D	L	GF	GA	GD	Pts	Promotion or relegation
7	VfB Leipzig	32	10	11	11	42	42	0	31	
8	Darmstadt 98	32	11	9	12	41	49	−8	31	
9	Mainz 05	32	9	12	11	39	38	+1	30	
10	1860 Munich (R)	32	8	14	10	31	32	−1	30	Relegation to Oberliga
11	Hallescher FC (R)	32	7	13	12	35	47	−12	27	Relegation to Oberliga
12	Rot-Weiß Erfurt (R)	32	5	7	20	36	75	−39	17	Relegation to Oberliga

Source: Bundesliga.de
Rules for classification: 1) points; 2) goal difference; 3) number of goals scored.
(R) Relegated

=== Results ===
==== Matches 1–22 ====
Home \ Away	CFC	D98	ERF	SCF	HFC	HOM	JEN	LEI	M05	WMA	M60	FCS
Chemnitzer FC	—	2–0	2–1	2–1	3–0	0–0	0–2	3–1	1–0	0–0	4–0	0–0
Darmstadt 98	0–0	—	1–0	1–3	1–1	0–3	3–1	2–1	1–3	0–0	2–0	1–4
Rot-Weiß Erfurt	3–2	2–2	—	2–2	2–3	3–3	0–1	1–3	0–5	0–3	2–1	1–6
SC Freiburg	4–0	3–1	6–0	—	3–1	0–0	1–0	3–1	2–0	2–2	2–1	1–0
Hallescher FC	1–1	2–2	4–1	1–1	—	0–1	0–0	3–1	2–2	0–0	2–2	3–0
FC Homburg	1–3	1–2	1–0	3–0	0–0	—	0–0	4–1	2–1	2–2	0–0	4–1
Carl Zeiss Jena	1–1	3–1	1–0	4–3	2–0	3–1	—	2–3	2–1	1–1	2–1	1–1
VfB Leipzig	0–0	1–1	3–0	3–3	2–0	1–1	0–1	—	1–1	1–0	2–3	1–1
Mainz 05	0–0	1–0	2–2	0–0	1–3	0–0	1–1	1–1	—	3–1	3–1	1–2
Waldhof Mannheim	1–1	3–1	2–1	2–0	3–0	0–0	2–0	1–0	1–1	—	0–0	2–1
1860 Munich	0–0	0–2	3–0	0–0	1–1	3–0	0–0	0–0	1–1	1–0	—	0–0
1. FC Saarbrücken	3–1	2–2	4–0	1–1	3–0	2–0	1–0	2–2	1–1	2–1	1–1	—

Source: DFB
Legend: Blue = home team win; Yellow = draw; Red = away team win.

==== Matches 23–32 ====
===== Championship group =====
Home \ Away	CFC	SCF	HOM	JEN	WMA	FCS
Chemnitzer FC	—	0–0	1–0	1–0	1–2	1–3
SC Freiburg	3–1	—	1–3	2–0	0–0	0–0
FC Homburg	0–1	3–1	—	2–2	0–2	4–0
Carl Zeiss Jena	1–2	1–2	3–1	—	3–2	0–0
Waldhof Mannheim	1–1	6–2	1–1	2–1	—	1–1
1. FC Saarbrücken	1–0	2–0	2–0	1–0	4–0	—

Source: DFB
Legend: Blue = home team win; Yellow = draw; Red = away team win.

===== Relegation group =====
Home \ Away	D98	ERF	HFC	LEI	M05	M60
Darmstadt 98	—	4–1	2–1	2–0	2–1	3–1
Rot-Weiß Erfurt	2–2	—	4–0	1–2	3–0	1–1
Hallescher FC	0–0	1–2	—	3–2	2–1	0–0
VfB Leipzig	3–0	0–0	1–1	—	0–1	1–0
Mainz 05	1–0	3–1	1–0	1–2	—	0–2
1860 Munich	3–0	2–0	2–0	0–2	1–1	—

Source: DFB
Legend: Blue = home team win; Yellow = draw; Red = away team win.

=== Top scorers ===
The league's top scorers:

Goals	Player	Team
16	(Germany) Michael Preetz	1. FC Saarbrücken
12	(Germany) Steffen Heidrich	Chemnitzer FC
11	(Germany) Andree Fincke	SC Freiburg
11	(Germany) Bernd Hobsch	VfB Leipzig
11	(Germany) Daniel Jurgeleit	FC 08 Homburg
11	(Germany) Wolfgang Schüler	1. FC Saarbrücken
11	(Germany) Uwe Spies	SC Freiburg

== Relegation play-offs ==
Contested between the two third bottom teams from each region and the second place team in the Oberliga Nord - TSV Havelse - for the final place in 2. Bundesliga in the next season. After SpVgg Blau-Weiß 1890 Berlin's license revoking and automatic relegation, Fortuna Köln were the Nord entrant. TSV 1860 Munich were the Süd entrant.

Pos	Team	Pld	W	D	L	GF	GA	GD	Pts
1	Fortuna Köln (C)	4	3	1	0	9	3	+6	7
2	1860 Munich	4	1	1	2	2	6	−4	3
3	TSV Havelse	4	0	2	2	2	4	−2	2

Source: Bundesliga.de
Rules for classification: 1) points; 2) goal difference; 3) number of goals scored.
(C) Champions

Fortuna Köln won the playoffs and so remained in the 2. Bundesliga. TSV 1860 Munich were relegated to the Oberliga, where TSV Havelse remained.
