= 2. Bundesliga =

Football league in Germany

- Organising body: Deutsche Fußball Liga (DFL)
- Founded: 1974; 52 years ago
- Country: Germany
- Confederation: UEFA
- Number of clubs: 18
- Level on pyramid: 2
- Promotion to: Bundesliga
- Relegation to: 3. Liga
- Domestic cup: DFB-Pokal
- Current champions: Schalke 04 (4th title) (2025–26)
- Most championships: 1. FC Köln (5 titles)
- Broadcasters: Sky Sport; RTL; Sat.1
- Website: bundesliga.com/2
- Current: 2026–27 2. Bundesliga

The 2. Bundesliga (Zweite Bundesliga [ˈtsvaɪtə ˈbʊndəsˌliːɡa]; lit. '2nd Federal League') is the second division of professional football in Germany. It was implemented 11 years after the founding of the Fußball-Bundesliga as the new second division for professional football. The 2. Bundesliga is ranked below the Bundesliga and above the 3. Liga in the German football league system. All of the 2. Bundesliga clubs take part in the DFB-Pokal, the annual German Cup competition. A total of 127 clubs have competed in the 2. Bundesliga since its foundation.

The decision to establish the league as the second level of football in West Germany was made in May 1973. The league started operating in August 1974, then with two divisions of 20 clubs. It was reduced to a single division in 1981. From the 1991–92 season onwards clubs from the former East Germany started participating in the league, briefly expanding it to two divisions again. It returned to a single division format again at the end of that season and has had 18 clubs since 1994. Two clubs from the 2. Bundesliga are directly promoted to the Bundesliga, while a third promoted club is determined through the play-offs, from 1974 to 1991 and again since 2008. Between 1991 and 2008 the third-placed club in the league was directly promoted. The bottom clubs in the league are relegated to the third division; from 1974 to 1994, the Oberliga, from 1994 to 2008, the Regionalliga and since 2008, the 3. Liga. The number of relegated clubs has fluctuated over the years. Since 2008 two clubs have been directly relegated while the third-last team has the opportunity to defend its league play in the play-offs against the third placed team of the 3. Liga.

1. FC Köln hold the record number of championships in the league having won their 5th on 18 May 2025. Arminia Bielefeld holds the record for number of promotions from the 2. Bundesliga to the Bundesliga, with eight.

For the 2024–25 season an average of 30,830 spectators watched 2. Bundesliga matches, the highest of any non-top flight football league in the world, and higher than the average attendance in many top flight leagues.

== History ==
=== Background ===
With the implementation of the Bundesliga in 1963, five Regionalliga were also founded as the 2nd highest playing level, South, Southwest, West, North and Berlin. The two top ranking teams from each Regionalliga at the end of a season were placed into groups to play against the relegation teams from the Bundesliga. With the transition from the former Oberliga to the newly created Bundesliga and Regionalliga, however, it became clear that the substructure of the Bundesliga was both sportingly and economically problematic and that relegation from the Bundesliga could easily ruin a club economically.

This situation was partly responsible for the Bundesliga scandal in 1971, in which, due to manipulations in point games in the relegation battle, Rot-Weiß Oberhausen and Arminia Bielefeld managed to remain in the Bundesliga. As a consequence of the scandal, the DFB-Bundestag in Frankfurt decided on 30 June 1973 to introduce a 2. Bundesliga, divided into a north and a south season, for the 1974–75 season, which should close the gap between professional and amateur areas.

=== Formation ===
The decision to establish the 2. Bundesliga as a fully professional league below the Bundesliga was made at the annual convention of the German Football Association, the DFB, in Frankfurt on 30 June 1973. The league replaced the five Regionalligas that were at this level from 1963 to 1974. Each Regionalliga had a set quota of clubs that could qualify for the new league with the Regionalliga Süd receiving thirteen spots, the Regionalliga West twelve, the Regionalliga Nord and Regionalliga Südwest seven and the Regionalliga Berlin one. The qualified teams were established through a ranking that took the last five seasons of the Regionalliga into account.

The new 2. Bundesliga was split into a northern and a southern division with 20 clubs each. Each division had its champion directly promoted to the Bundesliga while the two runners-up would contest a two-leg play-off to determine the third promoted team. The bottom four clubs in each league were relegated, however, as the number of clubs relegated from the Bundesliga to each division could vary, so could the number of clubs in the league and therefore the number of teams relegated.

=== 2. Bundesliga North and South 1974 to 1981 ===
The first-ever game of the league was played on Friday, 2 August 1974 between 1. FC Saarbrücken and Darmstadt 98 and ended in a 1–0 win for Saarbrücken, with Nikolaus Semlitsch scoring the first-ever goal of the new league in the 18th minute of the game. The inaugural champions of the league were Hannover 96 in the north and Karlsruher SC in the south, both former Bundesliga clubs. The play-offs for the third Bundesliga spot were contested by FK Pirmasens and Bayer Uerdingen, with Uerdingen winning 6–0 at home after a four-all draw in the first leg. The three promoted teams however proved uncompetitive in the Bundesliga with Hannover and Uerdingen being relegated straight away again while Karlsruhe lasted for only two seasons.

The second season saw league championships for Tennis Borussia Berlin and 1. FC Saarbrücken, with Tennis Borussia lasting for only one season and 1. FCS for two. The contest for the third promotion spot pitted two far bigger names of German football against each other, with Borussia Dortmund edging out 1. FC Nürnberg with two wins, ending Dortmund's four-year second division spell. The last round of the season in the south also saw an all-time goal scoring record per round when 55 goals were scored in ten games. The northern division incidentally set the second best mark when it scored 51 goals the day before.

In 1976–77 the league champions were FC St. Pauli and VfB Stuttgart while the third promotion spot went to 1860 Munich, having had to play a third game after Arminia Bielefeld and TSV 1860 each won their home games 4–0, with the decider ending 2–0 in favour of the southern team. Ottmar Hitzfeld set an all-time 2. Bundesliga record in May 1977 when he scored 6 goals in a league match for VfB Stuttgart against Jahn Regensburg. Bielefeld won promotion as the champions of the northern division in the following season, as did southern champion SV Darmstadt 98, entering the Bundesliga for the first time in its history. Third place went to 1. FC Nürnberg who overcame Rot-Weiss Essen with a 1–0 home win and a two–all draw away. For Nürnberg it ended a nine-year absence from the Bundesliga. Horst Hrubesch set an all-time record that season for goals in one season, 41 scored for Rot-Weiss Essen.

In 1978–79 direct promotion went to 1860 Munich and Bayer Leverkusen while the play-off was won, once more, by Bayer Uerdingen, which defeated SpVgg Bayreuth 2–1 at home after a draw away. In the north, two clubs were relegated from the league for financial reasons, Westfalia Herne, which had finished fifth and former Bundesliga side FC St. Pauli, which had come sixth. The following seasons saw 1. FC Nürnberg and Arminia Bielefeld clinch another promotion from the 2. Bundesliga, as did Karlsuher SC which overcame Rot-Weiss Essen by winning 5–1 at home after losing 3–1 away. Arminia Bielefeld set an all-time 2. Bundesliga record when it defeated Arminia Hannover 11–0 in May 1980, the biggest-ever win in the league.

The 1980–81 season, the seventh of the league, was also its last in this format. From 1981 it played as a single division of 20 teams after a decision taken on 7 June 1980, when, at a special convention of the DFB, the introduction of the single division 2. Bundesliga was decided upon with a majority of 84 votes to 77. The northern division was unusually strong that season, having received all three relegated teams of the 1979–80 Bundesliga season, SV Werder Bremen, Eintracht Braunschweig and Hertha BSC, and playing with 22 teams. Bremen won the league while Braunschweig came second. Hertha missed out despite scoring 123 goals. In the south, the league was won by SV Darmstadt 98 for a second time while runners-up Kickers Offenbach lost out to Braunschweig in the play-offs. The reduction of the league to a single division meant 22 teams were relegated while no team was promoted to the 2. Bundesliga that season.

=== Single division era 1981 to 1991 ===
The new single division league of 20 teams saw only a small change in modus. The top two in the league were promoted while the third placed team played the sixteenth placed Bundesliga side in a home-and-away play-off for one more spot in the Bundesliga. The bottom four in the league were relegated. The inaugural season saw FC Schalke 04 compete in the 2. Bundesliga for the first time, and win it. Second place went to Hertha BSC while third placed Kickers Offenbach missed out on promotion after losing both play-off games to Bayer Leverkusen. Fourth place went to 1860 Munich, one point behind Offenbach, but the club found itself relegated after the DFB refused it a license for the following season. This decision kept 17th placed SG Wattenscheid 09, the best-placed team on a relegation rank, in the league. The following season finally saw Kickers Offenbach win promotion from the 2. Bundesliga, behind champions SV Waldhof Mannheim who had never played in the Bundesliga before. Bayer Uerdingen, in third place, won promotion through the play-offs for a third time, this time overcoming the previous seasons 2. Bundesliga champions FC Schalke 04.

Schalke bounced back immediately, coming second behind Karlsruher SC in 1983–84. Third place went to MSV Duisburg wo were decisively beaten 0–5 by Bundesliga side Eintracht Frankfurt at home. At the other end, Rot-Weiss Essen, after having failed to win promotion to the Bundesliga through the play-offs twice from the 2. Bundesliga, was relegated to amateur football that season. 1. FC Nürnberg took out the championship of the single division 2. Bundesliga for the first time in 1985, with Hannover 96 coming second. Third placed 1. FC Saarbrücken also won promotion courtesy to a 2–0 home win over Arminia Bielefeld after a draw away. Kickers Offenbach, freshly relegated from the Bundesliga came only 19th in the 2. Bundesliga, suffered another relegation, as did another former Bundesliga side, FC St. Pauli, having returned to the league for the first time after having had its license revoked in 1979.

In 1985–86, three clubs from Berlin competed in the league, but none the following season, with Blau-Weiß 90 Berlin achieving its one and only promotion to the Bundesliga while Hertha BSC and Tennis Borussia were relegated to amateur football. The league champions were FC 08 Homburg, also promoted to the Bundesliga for the first time. Arguably one of the most famous play-off contests in 2. Bundesliga history however were the games between third placed Fortuna Köln and Borussia Dortmund. Köln won 2–0 at home, followed by a 3–1 for Dortmund, making a third game necessary as the away goal rule did not apply to the Bundesliga versus 2. Bundesliga play-offs at the time. This third game was won 8–0 by Borussia Dortmund in front of 50,000 in neutral Düsseldorf. In the relegation zone MSV Duisburg followed the two Berlin clubs into amateur football as a third former Bundesliga side that season.

Hannover 96 and Karlsruher SC won promotion once more in 1987 while third placed FC St. Pauli, freshly promoted from amateur football again, missed out by a goal in the play-offs against FC Homburg. At the bottom end Eintracht Braunschweig became another former Bundesliga side and champion to drop into the third division. FC St. Pauli ended a ten-year wait for Bundesliga return in 1988 when it finished runners-up to Stuttgarter Kickers who were promoted to the Bundesliga for the first time. Third placed SV Darmstadt 98 missed out on penalties in the deciding third game against SV Waldhof Mannheim after each side had won their home game by a goal. Arminia Bielefeld came a distant last and was relegated while 17th placed SpVgg Bayreuth was rescued when Rot-Weiß Oberhausen was refused a license.

Fortuna Düsseldorf won the league championship in 1988–89, with two clubs from the Saarland coming second and third, FC Homburg and 1. FC Saarbrücken. Saarbrücken however was unable to overcome Eintracht Frankfurt in the later club's second successful play-off defence of its Bundesliga place. SpVgg Bayreuth finished 17th again but was again spared from relegation when Kickers Offenbach was refused a license. Also relegated were Union Solingen after 14 consecutive seasons in the league. At the end of the season Spanish-born Joaquín Montañés retired from 2. Bundesliga football after 479 games for Alemannia Aachen in the league from 1974 to 1989, a record for any player with a single club in the league. In 1990 Hertha BSC completed its return from amateur football to the Bundesliga with a 2. Bundesliga title, followed up by SG Wattenscheid 09, who entered the Bundesliga for the first time. 1. FC Saarbrücken failed in the play-offs for a second consecutive time when it missed out to VfL Bochum, thereby ensuring a Bochum derby in the Bundesliga between VfL and Wattenscheid for the following season. In the relegation zone SpVgg Bayreuth failed to get reprieved for a third consecutive season and dropped into amateur football, as did Alemannia Aachen, a founding member of the 2. Bundesliga who had played all 16 seasons of the league until then.

The tenth season of the single division 2. Bundesliga was to be the last in its current format for a time as the German reunification in 1991 lead to changes to the league after this season. With FC Schalke 04 and MSV Duisburg two long-term Bundesliga teams finished at the top of the league. In third place Stuttgarter Kickers had to play FC St. Pauli three times to earn promotion, the first two contests having ended 1–1 while Stuttgart won the third 3–1. FC Schweinfurt 05 in last place became one of the worst clubs in the league history when it only won two games all season. Rot-Weiss Essen had its license revoked which allowed SV Darmstadt 98 to avoid relegation.

=== German reunification 1991–92 ===
In the 1991–92 season, the league was expanded to 24 teams in two regional divisions, north and south, to accommodate six new East German clubs which joined the league that season. The East German clubs were spread very unevenly, with one going to the north and five to the south, caused by the geographic location of those clubs. Only the league champions were promoted to the Bundesliga that year, which were Bayer Uerdingen in the north and 1. FC Saarbrücken in the south. The bottom three in each division were relegated, three of which were from former East Germany. The other two were former Bundesliga clubs, Blau-Weiß 90 Berlin and 1860 Munich, with the later having played its first season back in the 2. Bundesliga after their license was revoked in 1982. At the end of this season the league returned to the single division format, but with still 24 clubs as its strength.

=== Single division era 1992 to present ===
The 1992–93 season was a momentous one, with 24 teams competing in a single league and each club playing 46 games. Three clubs were promoted directly, as would be the case from then on until 2008, with the play-offs having been abolished. SC Freiburg won the league and promotion for the first time. Behind it, MSV Duisburg made a return to the Bundesliga while third placed VfB Leipzig became the first former East German club to earn promotion from the 2. Bundesliga. Seven clubs were relegated from the league to reduce its strength to 20 clubs again from the following season. Of those Eintracht Braunschweig, Fortuna Düsseldorf and SV Darmstadt 98 were former Bundesliga sides. The following season saw changes again as it was the last with 20 clubs. Promoted were VfL Bochum, Bayer Uerdingen and 1860 Munich, which had just won promotion from the third division the year before and returned to the Bundesliga for the first time since 1981. At the bottom end, five clubs were relegated, four of those former Bundesliga sides and the fifth one, Carl Zeiss Jena, from former East Germany.

The league level below the 2. Bundesliga was changed profoundly in 1994 with the Oberligas replaced by the new Regionalligas, which allowed for direct promotion to the 2. Bundesliga for the first time since 1980. The league itself was now reduced to 18 clubs with no play-offs, three promoted and four relegated teams, a system it would maintain until 2008, when the play-offs were re-introduced. Hansa Rostock won the 2. Bundesliga for the first time in 1995 and FC St. Pauli and Fortuna Düsseldorf followed it up to the Bundesliga. In the relegation zone FSV Frankfurt came a distant last with only three wins to its name while the two Saarland sides FC Homburg and 1. FC Saarbrücken accompanied it. The later, despite finishing seventh, had its license revoked, thereby sparing FSV Zwickau from relegation.

The 1995–96 season saw VfL Bochum win the league again with second placed Arminia Bielefeld winning promotion straight after having been promoted from the Regionalliga the year before. Third place went to MSV Duisburg while Hannover 96, 1. FC Nürnberg and SG Wattenscheid 09 were all former Bundesliga clubs now suffering relegation to the third division. The 1. FC Kaiserslautern and Eintracht Frankfurt had suffered their first-ever relegation from the Bundesliga in 1996. The former won the league and bounced back immediately while Frankfurt remained at this level for another season. Kaiseslautern was accompanied up by VfL Wolfsburg, who won promotion for the first time, and Hertha BSC. Kaiserslautern would also become the first and only club to win the Bundesliga as a freshly promoted side the following year. The 1. FC Kaiserslautern and SV Meppen also set a record for number of goals in a game, 13, when Kaiserslautern defeated Meppen 7–6. Eintracht Frankfurt won the league in 1998 with SC Freiburg coming second while 1. FC Nürnberg, freshly returned from the Regionalliga, came third. At the bottom end VfB Leipzig was one of three clubs from the east to be relegated, alongside SV Meppen, which dropped out of the league after eleven consecutive seasons there.

The 1998–99 season saw the 1. FC Köln in the league for the first time, having been relegated from the Bundesliga after 35 consecutive seasons there from the start of the league in 1963. Köln only managed to come tenth, while the league was won by Arminia Bielefeld. Behind Arminia Bielefeld, SpVgg Unterhaching and SSV Ulm 1846 entered the Bundesliga for the very first time. Last place in the league went to Fortuna Düsseldorf, which was accompanied to the Regionalliga by SG Wattenscheid 09, KFC Uerdingen 05, formerly Bayer Uerdingen, and FC Gütersloh. The first season of the new millennium saw the end of an era, with Fortuna Köln being relegated after 26 consecutive seasons in the league since the start in 1974. Local rival 1. FC Köln won the league while VfL Bochum came second and FC Energie Cottbus, in third place, moved up to the Bundesliga for the first time. Fortuna Köln was accompanied to the Regionalliga by Karlsruher SC, Kickers Offenbach and Tennis Borussia Berlin, who had their license revoked.

In 2000–01, the league was won by 1. FC Nürnberg once again, with Borussia Mönchengladbach earning promotion back to the Bundesliga after a two-year absence. FC St. Pauli was the third promoted team. SSV Ulm 1846, freshly relegated from the Bundesliga, finished the season in 16th place and became insolvent. Hannover 96, Arminia Bielefeld and VfL Bochum were the promoted teams in 2002, while the following season saw 1. FC Köln and Eintracht Frankfurt competing and succeeding for promotion again, behind league champions SC Freiburg.

In 2004, 1. FC Nürnberg and Arminia Bielefeld earned another one of their many promotions while third placed 1. FSV Mainz 05 was a newcomer to the Bundesliga. Like in 2003, 2005 saw 1. FC Köln and Eintracht Frankfurt win promotion while between them, in second place, MSV Duisburg moved up, too. At the bottom end three of the four relegated clubs shared similar names, Rot-Weiß Oberhausen, Rot-Weiss Essen and Rot-Weiß Erfurt with the fourth team relegated being Eintracht Trier.

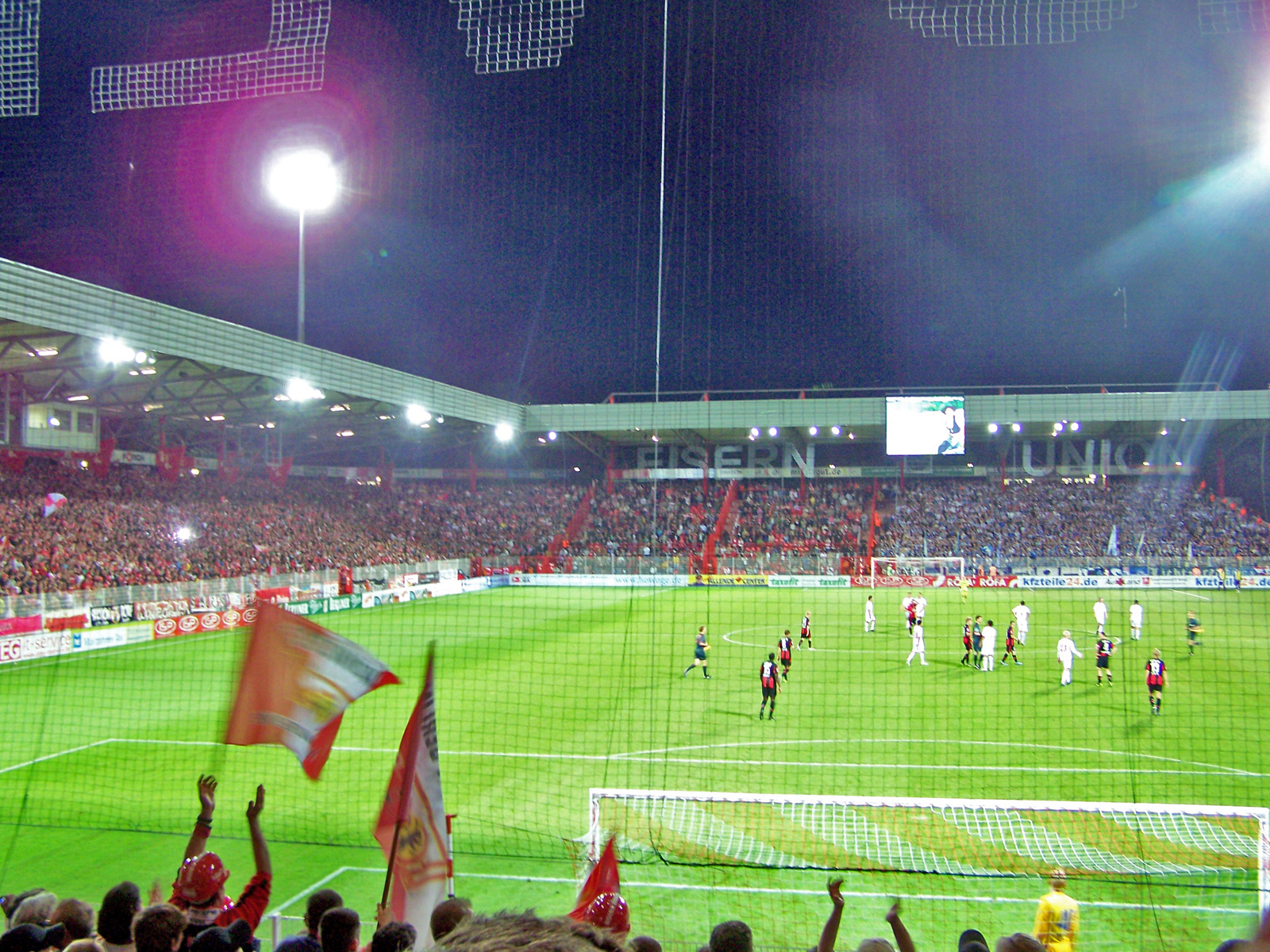
The Stadion An der Alten Försterei is the home of 1. FC Union Berlin. The club competed in the 2. Bundesliga for ten consecutive seasons.

VfL Bochum won the league again in 2006 while FC Energie Cottbus returned to the Bundesliga for a second three-year stint. In second place Alemannia Aachen returned to the Bundesliga for the first time since 1970. Relegated that year were Dynamo Dresden, former East German power house, after a two-year stint in the league. 2006 also saw the retirement of Willi Landgraf from 2. Bundesliga football. Landgraf had played a record 508 2. Bundesliga games from 1986 to 2006, playing in the league for Rot-Weiss Essen, FC 08 Homburg, FC Gütersloh and Alemannia Aachen. Karlsruher SC ended an absence from the Bundesliga that had lasted since 1998 when it won the league in 2007 and was followed up by Hansa Rostock and MSV Duisburg. Freshly relegated Borussia Mönchengladbach won the league the following year, with new Bundesliga club TSG 1899 Hoffenheim second and 1. FC Köln third.

The 2008–09 season saw the return of play-offs. The third placed team in the 2. Bundesliga now played the 16th placed team in the Bundesliga for a spot in that league. At the other end of the table, the 16th placed 2. Bundesliga side would now also play the third placed team in the new 3. Liga, which had replaced the Regionalliga as the third division. SC Freiburg and 1. FSV Mainz 05 were directly promoted that season while 1. FC Nürnberg had to enter the play-offs in which it defeated FC Energie Cottbus 5–0 on aggregate. At the relegation end, VfL Osnabrück lost its 2. Bundesliga place to SC Paderborn from the 3. Liga.

1. FC Kaiserslautern ended a four-year spell in the 2. Bundesliga in 2010 with a league championship, with FC St. Pauli coming second. The FC Augsburg finished third but was unable to overcome 1. FC Nürnberg in the play-offs and lost 3–0 on aggregate. Hansa Rostock, in 16th place, dropped out of the 2. Bundesliga when it lost both play-off games to Ingolstadt 04. Hertha BSC and FC Augsburg were directly promoted to the Bundesliga in 2010, the later for the first time, while VfL Bochum in third place missed out on promotion against Borussia Mönchengladbach. VfL Osnabrück found itself unsuccessfully defending its league place again, losing to Dynamo Dresden in extra time in the second leg.

After 15 consecutive seasons in the 2. Bundesliga a numerous attempts at promotion Greuther Fürth finally won the league in 2012. Eintracht Frankfurt came second and Fortuna Düsseldorf returned to the Bundesliga for the first time since 1997 when it defeated Hertha BSC in the play-offs. Karlsruher SC failed to remain in the 2. Bundesliga when it was relegated on away goal rule after two drawn games against Jahn Regensburg.

Hertha BSC won the 2. Bundesliga for the second time in three seasons in 2012–13 and was accompanied up by Eintracht Braunschweig, who had not played in the Bundesliga since 1985. Third placed 1. FC Kaiserslautern lost both games to 1899 Hoffenheim and thereby failed to get promoted. Dynamo Dresden became the first 2. Bundesliga side in five attempts to hold onto their league place while 3. Liga side VfL Osnabrück missed out in the play-offs for a third time in three attempts. The 2013–14 season ended with 1. FC Köln winning the league, followed up by SC Paderborn who won promotion to the Bundesliga for the first time. Relegated where Energie Cottbus and Dynamo Dresden, both former Bundesliga sides. Third placed SpVgg Greuther Fürth failed to gain promotion after two draws with Bundesliga club Hamburger SV. At the bottom end two eastern clubs were relegated, Dynamo Dresden and Energie Cottbus, while Arminia Bielefeld entered the relegation round.

The 2014–15 season saw Ingolstadt 04 win the league and earn Bundesliga promotion for the first time while SV Darmstadt 98 finished second and returned to the Bundesliga for the first time since 1982. Third placed Karlsruher SC faced Hamburg for another Bundesliga spot while TSV 1860 Munich had to play Holstein Kiel to retain their place in the 2. Bundesliga. Both the Bundesliga and 2. Bundesliga clubs retained their league membership. The two clubs directly relegated from the league where Erzgebirge Aue and VfR Aalen. In the 2015–16 the league was won by SC Freiburg, with RB Leipzig finishing runners-up and earning its first-ever Bundesliga promotion, while 1. FC Nürnberg had to enter the promotion play-off where it lost on aggregate to Eintracht Frankfurt. At the bottom end of the table SC Paderborn suffered consecutive relegations, becoming the sixth club to drop from the Bundesliga to the third tier in consecutive seasons. FSV Frankfurt was the second team directly relegated while MSV Duisburg entered the relegation play-off where it was unsuccessful. All the clubs promoted to the 2. Bundesliga had played there before but while Dynamo Dresden and Erzgebirge Aue had only experienced a short absence the third club, Würzburger Kickers, had not played at this level for almost 40 years.

After their relegation, the 2018–19 season was Hamburger SV's first season outside of the German top flight in their 55-year history.

== Logo history ==
For the first time in 1996, the Bundesliga was given its own logo to distinguish itself. Six years later, the logo was revamped into a portrait orientation, which was used until 2010. A new logo was announced for the 2010–11 season in order to modernise the brand logo for all media platforms. To celebrate the 50th anniversary of the Bundesliga, a special logo was developed for the 2012–13 season, featuring a "50" and "1963–2013". Following the season, the 2010 logo was restored. In December 2016, it was announced that a new logo would be used for the 2017–18 season, modified slightly for digitisation requirements, featuring a matte look.

In December 2016, it was announced that for the first time, the 2. Bundesliga would be given its own logo, taking effect at the start of the 2017–18 season. Previously, the 2. Bundesliga had borrowed the Bundesliga logo for promotional and media purposes. The 2. Bundesliga gained its own logo to "strengthen the profile of the competition" and to better identify the league with fans, the media, and sponsors.

== All-time table ==
As of August 2025, the most consistent team in the league has been SpVgg Greuther Fürth, who have won 1800 points in 1230 games (using the three points per win scheme). In second place sits FC St. Pauli with 1690 points, and Hannover 96 is third with 1607 points. Last place, number 128, goes to Spandauer SV with just ten points to its name. (subject to change in the future)

== Clubs ==
=== Members for 2026–27 season ===
Locations of the 2026–27 2. Bundesliga teams

Team	Location	Stadium	Capacity
Hertha BSC	Berlin	Olympiastadion	74,649
Arminia Bielefeld	Bielefeld	Schüco-Arena	27,332
VfL Bochum	Bochum	Vonovia Ruhrstadion	26,000
Eintracht Braunschweig	Braunschweig	Eintracht-Stadion	23,325
Energie Cottbus	Cottbus	LEAG Energie Stadion	22,528
Darmstadt 98	Darmstadt	Merck-Stadion am Böllenfalltor	17,650
Dynamo Dresden	Dresden	Rudolf-Harbig-Stadion	32,249
Greuther Fürth	Fürth	Sportpark Ronhof Thomas Sommer	16,626
Hannover 96	Hanover	Heinz von Heiden Arena	49,000
1. FC Heidenheim	Heidenheim	Voith-Arena	15,000
1. FC Kaiserslautern	Kaiserslautern	Fritz-Walter-Stadion	49,327
Karlsruher SC	Karlsruhe	BBBank Wildpark	34,302
Holstein Kiel	Kiel	Holstein-Stadion	15,034
1. FC Magdeburg	Magdeburg	Avnet Arena	30,098
1. FC Nürnberg	Nuremberg	Max-Morlock-Stadion	49,923
VfL Osnabrück	Osnabrück	Stadion an der Bremer Brücke	15,741
FC St. Pauli	Hamburg	Millerntor-Stadion	29,546
VfL Wolfsburg	Wolfsburg	Volkswagen Arena	30,000

=== Seasons in 2. Bundesliga ===
There are 128 teams that have taken part in 53 2. Bundesliga seasons that were played from the 1974–75 season until the 2026–27 season. The teams in bold compete in the 2. Bundesliga currently. The teams in italics represent defunct teams. The year in parentheses represents the most recent year of participation at this level.

- **37** seasons: **Greuther Fürth** (2027)
- **33** seasons: **FC St. Pauli** (2027)
- **31** seasons: **Hannover 96** (2027)
- **30** seasons: **Karlsruher SC** (2027)
- **28** seasons: Alemannia Aachen (2012)
- **27** seasons: **Darmstadt 98** (2027), **VfL Osnabrück** (2027)
- **26** seasons: Fortuna Köln (2000)
- **25** seasons: **1. FC Nürnberg** (2027)
- **24** seasons: **Arminia Bielefeld** (2027)
- **23** seasons: Stuttgarter Kickers (2001), **Eintracht Braunschweig** (2027)
- **22** seasons: SC Freiburg (2016), MSV Duisburg (2019)
- **20** seasons: SG Wattenscheid (1999), Waldhof Mannheim (2003), 1860 Munich (2017), Fortuna Düsseldorf (2026)
- **19** seasons: 1. FC Saarbrücken (2006), Mainz 05 (2009), **Hertha BSC** (2027)
- **18** seasons: Rot-Weiß Oberhausen (2011), **VfL Bochum** (2027)
- **16** seasons: Rot-Weiss Essen (2007), FSV Frankfurt (2016), Erzgebirge Aue (2022), SC Paderborn (2026), **1. FC Kaiserslautern** (2027)
- **15** seasons: FC 08 Homburg (1995)
- **14** seasons: Union Solingen (1989), Kickers Offenbach (2008)
- **13** seasons: Union Berlin (2019)
- **12** seasons: SpVgg Bayreuth (1990), FC Augsburg (2011), **Energie Cottbus** (2027), **Dynamo Dresden** (2027), **Holstein Kiel** (2027)
- **11** seasons: SV Meppen (1998), KFC Uerdingen (1999), SpVgg Unterhaching (2007), SV Sandhausen (2023), Hansa Rostock (2024), Jahn Regensburg (2025), Preußen Münster (2026)
- **10** seasons: 1. FC Köln (2025), **1. FC Heidenheim** (2027)
- **9** seasons: Tennis Borussia Berlin (2000), FC Ingolstadt (2022), SSV Ulm (2025), Schalke 04 (2026)
- **8** seasons: Hessen Kassel (1990), Eintracht Trier (2005), Carl Zeiss Jena (2008), Rot Weiss Ahlen (2010), **VfL Wolfsburg** (2027)
- **7** seasons: Blau-Weiß 90 Berlin (1992), Wuppertaler SV (1994), Chemnitzer FC (2001), Hamburger SV (2025)
- **6** seasons: Wormatia Worms (1982), VfB Leipzig (1998), Eintracht Frankfurt (2012), **1. FC Magdeburg** (2027)
- **5** seasons: Freiburger FC (1982), FC Remscheid (1993), VfB Oldenburg (1997), Wacker Burghausen (2007)
- **4** seasons: Schwarz-Weiß Essen (1978), Bayern Hof (1978), FK Pirmasens (1978), Wacker 04 Berlin (1979), Westfalia Herne (1979), Bayer Leverkusen (1979), Arminia Hannover (1980), Röchling Völklingen (1980), FV 04 Würzburg (1980), SC Göttingen 05 (1981), SC Herford (1981), Rot-Weiß Lüdenscheid (1981), VfR Bürstadt (1985), FSV Zwickau (1998), 1. FC Schweinfurt (2002), SSV Reutlingen (2003), VfB Lübeck (2004), TuS Koblenz (2010), VfB Stuttgart (2020), Wehen Wiesbaden (2024)
- **3** seasons: KSV Baunatal (1979), SpVgg Erkenschwick (1981), Viktoria Köln (1981), Borussia Neunkirchen (1981), Viktoria Aschaffenburg (1989), FC Gütersloh (1999), Borussia Mönchengladbach (2008), VfR Aalen (2015), Würzburger Kickers (2021), SV Elversberg (2026)
- **2** seasons: Borussia Dortmund (1976), DJK Gütersloh (1976), FC Mülheim (1976), OSC Bremerhaven (1980), MTV Ingolstadt (1980), DSC Wanne-Eickel (1980), 1. FC Bocholt (1981), OSV Hannover (1981), ESV Ingolstadt (1981), Rot-Weiß Erfurt (2005), RB Leipzig (2016), Werder Bremen (2022)
- **1** season: HSV Barmbek-Uhlenhorst (1975), VfR Heilbronn (1975), VfR Mannheim (1975), Olympia Wilhelmshaven (1975), Eintracht Bad Kreuznach (1976), Spandauer SV (1976), Bonner SC (1977), BSV Schwenningen (1977), FC Hanau 93 (1979), VfB Eppingen (1981), TuS Schloß Neuhaus (1983), SCC Berlin (1984), FSV Salmrohr (1987), TSV Havelse (1991), Stahl Brandenburg (1992), Hallescher FC (1992), SV Babelsberg (2002), Sportfreunde Siegen (2006), TSG Hoffenheim (2008)

== Division set-up ==
=== Changes in division set-up ===
- Number of clubs
  - Current (since 1994–95): 18 teams
  - From 1974 to 1975 to 1980–81: two divisions (Nord and Süd)
    - From 1974 to 1975 to 1978–79: 20 teams each
    - 1979–80: 20 teams (Nord), 21 teams (Süd)
    - 1980–81: 22 teams (Nord), 20 teams (Süd)
  - From 1981 to 1982 to 1990–91: 20 teams
  - 1991–92: two divisions (Nord and Süd) of 12 teams each, divisions split into promotion/relegation groups of 6 teams each after 22 rounds
  - 1992–93: 24 teams
  - 1993–94: 20 teams
- Teams promoted to the Bundesliga: 3; 1981–1991 there was a promotion/relegation round, in 1991–92 there was 1 promotion per group.
- Number of relegations into the Regionalliga (until 1994: Oberliga): 4; 1991–92: 2–3 per group (inclusive relegation); 1992–93: 7.

=== Promotion and relegation ===
- From the 1992–93 season to the 2008–09 season, the top three teams gained promotion into the Bundesliga; after this, and to the present, only the top two teams are promoted automatically, and the third placed team plays a two-leg playoff against the team that finishes 16th in the Bundesliga.
- Until the 2007–08 season, the bottom four teams were relegated into the Regional leagues. Since the 2008–09, following the inception of the 3. Liga, only the bottom two teams are relegated into the 3. Liga automatically; the third from bottom team can avoid relegation by winning a two-leg playoff against the team that finishes in third place in the 3. Liga.

== League rules ==
Since the 2006–07 season there is no longer a limit on non-EU players in the league. Instead clubs are required to have 8 players on the squad who have come up through the youth system of a German club, 4 of which have to come from the club's own youth system. Seven substitutes are permitted to be selected, from which three can be used in the duration of the game.

== League champions ==
=== 2. Bundesliga North ===
Season	Champions	Runners-up
1974–75	Hannover 96	**Bayer Uerdingen**
1975–76	Tennis Borussia Berlin	**Borussia Dortmund**
1976–77	FC St. Pauli	Arminia Bielefeld
1977–78	Arminia Bielefeld	Rot-Weiss Essen
1978–79	Bayer Leverkusen	**Bayer Uerdingen**
1979–80	Arminia Bielefeld	Rot-Weiss Essen
1980–81	Werder Bremen	**Eintracht Braunschweig**

=== 2. Bundesliga South ===
Season	Champions	Runners-up
1974–75	Karlsruher SC	Pirmasens
1975–76	1. FC Saarbrücken	1. FC Nürnberg
1976–77	VfB Stuttgart	**1860 Munich**
1977–78	Darmstadt 98	**1. FC Nürnberg**
1978–79	1860 Munich	Bayreuth
1979–80	1. FC Nürnberg	**Karlsruher SC**
1980–81	Darmstadt 98	Kickers Offenbach

=== 2. Bundesliga ===
Season	Champions	Runners-up	Third place
1981–82	Schalke 04	Hertha BSC	Kickers Offenbach
1982–83	Waldhof Mannheim	Kickers Offenbach	**Uerdingen**
1983–84	Karlsruher SC	Schalke 04	MSV Duisburg
1984–85	1. FC Nürnberg	Hannover 96	**1. FC Saarbrücken**
1985–86	Homburg	BW Berlin	Fortuna Köln
1986–87	Hannover 96	Karlsruher SC	FC St. Pauli
1987–88	Stuttgarter Kickers	FC St. Pauli	Darmstadt 98
1988–89	Fortuna Düsseldorf	Homburg	1. FC Saarbrücken
1989–90	Hertha BSC	Wattenscheid	1. FC Saarbrücken
1990–91	Schalke 04	MSV Duisburg	**Stuttgarter Kickers**

=== 2. Bundesliga North ===
Season	Champions	Runners-up
1991–92	**Bayer Uerdingen**	VfB Oldenburg

=== 2. Bundesliga South ===
Season	Champions	Runners-up
1991–92	**1. FC Saarbrücken**	Waldhof Mannheim

=== 2. Bundesliga ===
Season	Champions	Runners-up	Third place
1992–93	SC Freiburg	MSV Duisburg	**VfB Leipzig**
1993–94	VfL Bochum	Uerdingen	**1860 Munich**
1994–95	Hansa Rostock	FC St. Pauli	**Fortuna Düsseldorf**
1995–96	VfL Bochum	Arminia Bielefeld	**MSV Duisburg**
1996–97	1. FC Kaiserslautern	VfL Wolfsburg	**Hertha BSC**
1997–98	Eintracht Frankfurt	SC Freiburg	**1. FC Nürnberg**
1998–99	Arminia Bielefeld	Unterhaching	**SSV Ulm**
1999–2000	1. FC Köln	VfL Bochum	**Energie Cottbus**
2000–01	1. FC Nürnberg	Borussia Mönchengladbach	**St. Pauli**
2001–02	Hannover 96	Arminia Bielefeld	**VfL Bochum**
2002–03	SC Freiburg	1. FC Köln	**Eintracht Frankfurt**
2003–04	1. FC Nürnberg	Arminia Bielefeld	**Mainz 05**
2004–05	1. FC Köln	Duisburg	**Eintracht Frankfurt**
2005–06	VfL Bochum	Alemannia Aachen	**Energie Cottbus**
2006–07	Karlsruher SC	Hansa Rostock	**Duisburg**
2007–08	Borussia Mönchengladbach	Hoffenheim	**1. FC Köln**
2008–09	SC Freiburg	Mainz 05	**1. FC Nürnberg**
2009–10	1. FC Kaiserslautern	St. Pauli	FC Augsburg
2010–11	Hertha BSC	FC Augsburg	VfL Bochum
2011–12	Greuther Fürth	Eintracht Frankfurt	**Fortuna Düsseldorf**
2012–13	Hertha BSC	Eintracht Braunschweig	1. FC Kaiserslautern
2013–14	1. FC Köln	SC Paderborn	Greuther Fürth
2014–15	FC Ingolstadt	Darmstadt 98	Karlsruher SC
2015–16	SC Freiburg	RB Leipzig	1. FC Nürnberg
2016–17	VfB Stuttgart	Hannover 96	Eintracht Braunschweig
2017–18	Fortuna Düsseldorf	1. FC Nürnberg	Holstein Kiel
2018–19	1. FC Köln	SC Paderborn	**1. FC Union Berlin**
2019–20	Arminia Bielefeld	VfB Stuttgart	1. FC Heidenheim
2020–21	VfL Bochum	Greuther Fürth	Holstein Kiel
2021–22	Schalke 04	Werder Bremen	Hamburger SV
2022–23	1. FC Heidenheim	Darmstadt 98	Hamburger SV
2023–24	FC St. Pauli	Holstein Kiel	Fortuna Düsseldorf
2024–25	1. FC Köln	Hamburger SV	SV Elversberg
2025–26	Schalke 04	SV Elversberg	**SC Paderborn**

- **Bold** denotes team earned promotion.

== Promoted and relegated teams ==
The list of teams that earned promotion to and from the 2. Bundesliga or were relegated from the league:

Season	Promoted to the Bundesliga	Relegated to the Oberliga/Regionalliga/3. Liga	Promoted from the Oberliga/Regionalliga/3. Liga
1974–75	Hannover 96, Bayer Uerdingen (Nord); Karlsruher SC (Süd)	Olympia Wilhelmshaven, Rot-Weiß Oberhausen, VfL Wolfsburg, HSV Barmbek-Uhlenhorst (Nord); VfR Heilbronn, Borussia Neunkirchen, VfR Wormatia Worms, VfR Mannheim (Süd)	Bayer Leverkusen, Spandauer SV, Westfalia Herne, Union Solingen (Nord); Eintracht Kreuznach, FSV Frankfurt, Jahn Regensburg, SSV Reutlingen (Süd)
1975–76	Tennis Borussia Berlin, Borussia Dortmund (Nord); 1. FC Saarbrücken (Süd)	1. FC Mülheim, SpVgg Erkenschwick, DJK Gütersloh, Spandauer SV (Nord); Mainz 05, FC Schweinfurt 05, Eintracht Bad Kreuznach, SSV Reutlingen (Süd)	Arminia Hannover, Bonner SC, SC Herford, VfL Wolfsburg (Nord); BSV Schwenningen, Eintracht Trier, FV Würzburg 04, KSV Baunatal (Süd)
1976–77	FC St. Pauli (Nord); VfB Stuttgart, 1860 Munich (Süd)	Bonner SC, Göttingen 05, Wacker 04 Berlin, VfL Wolfsburg (Nord); Röchling Völklingen, Jahn Regensburg, BSV 07 Schwenningen (Süd)	1. FC Bocholt, OSC Bremerhaven, Rot-Weiß Lüdenscheid (Nord); Freiburger FC, Würzburger Kickers, VfR Oli Bürstadt, Wormatia Worms (Süd)
1977–78	Arminia Bielefeld (Nord); Darmstadt 98, 1. FC Nürnberg (Süd)	1. FC Bocholt, OSC Bremerhaven, Schwarz-Weiß Essen (Nord); FC Bayern Hof, VfR 1910 Bürstadt, Kickers Würzburg, FK Pirmasens (Süd)	DSC Wanne-Eickel, Holstein Kiel, Viktoria Köln, Wacker 04 Berlin (Nord); Borussia Neunkirchen, FC Hanau 93, MTV Ingolstadt, SC Freiburg (Süd)
1978–79	Bayer 04 Leverkusen, Bayer Uerdingen (Nord); 1860 Munich (Süd)	Westfalia Herne, FC St. Pauli, Wacker 04 Berlin (Nord); FC Hanau 93, FC Augsburg, KSV Baunatal, Borussia Neunkirchen (Süd)	OSC Bremerhaven, OSV Hannover, Rot-Weiß Oberhausen, SC Herford (Nord); ESV Ingolstadt, SV Röchling Völklingen, SSV Ulm 1846, VfR Oli Bürstadt (Süd)
1979–80	Arminia Bielefeld (Nord); 1. FC Nürnberg, Karlsruher SC (Süd)	DSC Wanne-Eickel, OSC Bremerhaven, Arminia Hannover, Wuppertaler SV (Nord); MTV 1881 Ingolstadt, Röchling Völklingen, FV Würzburg 04 (Süd)	1. FC Bocholt, Göttingen 05, SpVgg Erkenschwick, VfB Oldenburg (Nord); Borussia Neunkirchen, FC Augsburg, Hessen Kassel, VfB Eppingen (Süd)
1980–81	Werder Bremen, Eintracht Braunschweig (Nord); Darmstadt 98 (Süd)	Because of the reduction of the league to a single division 22 clubs were relegated	None
1981–82	FC Schalke 04, Hertha BSC	1860 Munich, VfR Wormatia Worms, Freiburger FC, SpVgg Bayreuth	FSV Frankfurt, FC Augsburg, BV Lüttringhausen, TuS Schloß Neuhaus
1982–83	SV Waldhof Mannheim, Kickers Offenbach, Bayer Uerdingen	FC Augsburg, SpVgg Fürth, FSV Frankfurt, TuS Schloß Neuhaus	Rot-Weiß Oberhausen, SC Charlottenburg, SSV Ulm 1846, 1. FC Saarbrücken
1983–84	Karlsruher SC, FC Schalke 04	Rot-Weiss Essen, SC Charlottenburg, VfL Osnabrück, BV 08 Lüttringhausen	VfR Bürstadt, FC 08 Homburg, FC St. Pauli, Blau-Weiß 90 Berlin
1984–85	1. FC Nürnberg, Hannover 96, 1. FC Saarbrücken	FC St. Pauli, VfR 1910 Bürstadt, Kickers Offenbach, SSV Ulm 1846	VfL Osnabrück, Tennis Borussia Berlin, Viktoria Aschaffenburg, SpVgg Bayreuth
1985–86	FC 08 Homburg, Blau-Weiß 90 Berlin	Hertha BSC, SpVgg Bayreuth, Tennis Borussia Berlin, MSV Duisburg	SSV Ulm 1846, FSV Salmrohr, FC St. Pauli, Rot-Weiss Essen
1986–87	Hannover 96, Karlsruher SC	Eintracht Braunschweig, Viktoria Aschaffenburg, KSV Hessen Kassel, FSV Salmrohr	Kickers Offenbach, SpVgg Bayreuth, SV Meppen, BVL 08 Remscheid
1987–88	Stuttgarter Kickers, FC St. Pauli	Rot-Weiß Oberhausen, BVL 08 Remscheid, SSV Ulm 1846, Arminia Bielefeld	Eintracht Braunschweig, Hertha BSC, Viktoria Aschaffenburg, Mainz 05
1988–89	Fortuna Düsseldorf, FC 08 Homburg	Kickers Offenbach, Viktoria Aschaffenburg, Mainz 05, Union Solingen	KSV Hessen Kassel, SpVgg Unterhaching, MSV Duisburg, Preußen Münster
1989–90	Hertha BSC, SG Wattenscheid 09	KSV Hessen Kassel, SpVgg Bayreuth, Alemannia Aachen, SpVgg Unterhaching	VfB Oldenburg, TSV Havelse, Mainz 05, 1. FC Schweinfurt 05
1990–91	FC Schalke 04, MSV Duisburg, Stuttgarter Kickers	Rot-Weiss Essen, Preußen Münster, TSV Havelse, Schweinfurt 05	FC Remscheid, 1860 Munich (West); Stahl Brandenburg, VfB Leipzig, Chemnitzer FC, Carl Zeiss Jena, Hallescher FC, Rot-Weiß Erfurt (East)
1991–92	Bayer Uerdingen (Nord); 1. FC Saarbrücken (Süd)	Blau-Weiß 90 Berlin, BSV Stahl Brandenburg (Nord); 1860 Munich, Hallescher FC, FC Rot-Weiß Erfurt (Süd)	Wuppertaler SV, VfL Wolfsburg, SpVgg Unterhaching
1992–93	SC Freiburg, MSV Duisburg, VfB Leipzig	SpVgg Unterhaching, Eintracht Braunschweig, VfL Osnabrück, Fortuna Düsseldorf, VfB Oldenburg, Darmstadt 98, FC Remscheid	1860 Munich, Rot-Weiss Essen, Tennis Borussia Berlin
1993–94	VfL Bochum, Bayer Uerdingen, 1860 Munich	Stuttgarter Kickers, Carl Zeiss Jena, Wuppertaler SV, Rot-Weiss Essen, Tennis Borussia Berlin	Fortuna Düsseldorf, FSV Frankfurt, FSV Zwickau
1994–95	Hansa Rostock, FC St. Pauli, Fortuna Düsseldorf	1. FC Saarbrücken, FC 08 Homburg, FSV Frankfurt	SpVgg Unterhaching, VfB Lübeck, Carl Zeiss Jena, Arminia Bielefeld
1995–96	VfL Bochum, Arminia Bielefeld, MSV Duisburg	Chemnitzer FC, Hannover 96, 1. FC Nürnberg, SG Wattenscheid 09	VfB Oldenburg, Rot-Weiss Essen, FC Gütersloh, Stuttgarter Kickers
1996–97	1. FC Kaiserslautern, VfL Wolfsburg, Hertha BSC	SV Waldhof Mannheim, VfB Lübeck, Rot-Weiss Essen, VfB Oldenburg	Greuther Fürth, Energie Cottbus, SG Wattenscheid 09, 1. FC Nürnberg
1997–98	Eintracht Frankfurt, SC Freiburg, 1. FC Nürnberg	VfB Leipzig, Carl Zeiss Jena, FSV Zwickau, SV Meppen	SSV Ulm 1846, Rot-Weiß Oberhausen, Hannover 96, Tennis Borussia Berlin
1998–99	Arminia Bielefeld, SpVgg Unterhaching, SSV Ulm 1846	FC Gütersloh, KFC Uerdingen 05, SG Wattenscheid 09, Fortuna Düsseldorf	SV Waldhof Mannheim, Kickers Offenbach, Chemnitzer FC, Alemannia Aachen
1999–2000	1. FC Köln, VfL Bochum, Energie Cottbus	Tennis Borussia Berlin, Fortuna Köln, Kickers Offenbach, Karlsruher SC	LR Ahlen, SSV Reutlingen, 1. FC Saarbrücken, VfL Osnabrück
2000–01	1. FC Nürnberg, Borussia Mönchengladbach, FC St. Pauli	VfL Osnabrück, SSV Ulm 1846, Stuttgarter Kickers, Chemnitzer FC	SV Babelsberg 03, Union Berlin, Karlsruher SC, 1. FC Schweinfurt 05
2001–02	Hannover 96, Arminia Bielefeld, VfL Bochum	SpVgg Unterhaching, 1. FC Saarbrücken, Schweinfurt 05, SV Babelsberg 03	Wacker Burghausen, Eintracht Trier, VfB Lübeck, Eintracht Braunschweig
2002–03	SC Freiburg, 1. FC Köln, Eintracht Frankfurt	Eintracht Braunschweig, SSV Reutlingen 05, FC St. Pauli, SV Waldhof Mannheim	Jahn Regensburg, SpVgg Unterhaching, Erzgebirge Aue, VfL Osnabrück
2003–04	1. FC Nürnberg, Arminia Bielefeld, Mainz 05	VfB Lübeck, Jahn Regensburg, Union Berlin, VfL Osnabrück	Rot-Weiß Erfurt, 1. FC Saarbrücken, Rot-Weiss Essen, Dynamo Dresden
2004–05	1. FC Köln, MSV Duisburg, Eintracht Frankfurt	Eintracht Trier, Rot-Weiß Oberhausen, Rot-Weiss Essen, FC Rot-Weiß Erfurt	Eintracht Braunschweig, SC Paderborn, Kickers Offenbach, Sportfreunde Siegen
2005–06	VfL Bochum, Alemannia Aachen, Energie Cottbus	Dynamo Dresden, 1. FC Saarbrücken, LR Ahlen, Sportfreunde Siegen	FC Augsburg, TuS Koblenz, Carl Zeiss Jena, Rot-Weiss Essen
2006–07	Karlsruher SC, Hansa Rostock, MSV Duisburg	Rot-Weiss Essen, SpVgg Unterhaching, SV Wacker Burghausen, Eintracht Braunschweig	SV Wehen, TSG 1899 Hoffenheim, FC St. Pauli, VfL Osnabrück
2007–08	Borussia Mönchengladbach, TSG 1899 Hoffenheim, 1. FC Köln	Kickers Offenbach, Erzgebirge Aue, SC Paderborn, FC Carl Zeiss Jena	FSV Frankfurt, Ingolstadt 04, Rot Weiss Ahlen, Rot-Weiß Oberhausen
2008–09	SC Freiburg, Mainz 05, 1. FC Nürnberg	VfL Osnabrück, Ingolstadt 04, SV Wehen Wiesbaden	Union Berlin, Fortuna Düsseldorf, SC Paderborn
2009–10	1. FC Kaiserslautern, FC St. Pauli	Hansa Rostock, TuS Koblenz, Rot Weiss Ahlen	VfL Osnabrück, Erzgebirge Aue, Ingolstadt 04
2010–11	Hertha BSC, FC Augsburg	VfL Osnabrück, Rot-Weiß Oberhausen, Arminia Bielefeld	Eintracht Braunschweig, Hansa Rostock, Dynamo Dresden
2011–12	Greuther Fürth, Eintracht Frankfurt, Fortuna Düsseldorf (via play-off)	Hansa Rostock, Alemannia Aachen, Karlsruher SC	SV Sandhausen, VfR Aalen, Jahn Regensburg
2012–13	Hertha BSC, Eintracht Braunschweig	MSV Duisburg, Jahn Regensburg	Karlsruher SC, Arminia Bielefeld
2013–14	1. FC Köln, SC Paderborn	Energie Cottbus, Dynamo Dresden, Arminia Bielefeld (via play-off)	1. FC Heidenheim, RB Leipzig, Darmstadt 98
2014–15	Ingolstadt 04, Darmstadt 98	Erzgebirge Aue, VfR Aalen	Arminia Bielefeld, MSV Duisburg
2015–16	SC Freiburg, RB Leipzig	MSV Duisburg, FSV Frankfurt, SC Paderborn	Dynamo Dresden, Erzgebirge Aue, Würzburger Kickers
2016–17	VfB Stuttgart, Hannover 96	1860 Munich (to RL Bayern), Würzburger Kickers, Karlsruher SC	MSV Duisburg, Holstein Kiel, Jahn Regensburg
2017–18	Fortuna Düsseldorf, 1. FC Nürnberg	Eintracht Braunschweig, 1. FC Kaiserslautern	1. FC Magdeburg, SC Paderborn
2018–19	1. FC Köln, SC Paderborn, Union Berlin (via play-off)	1. FC Magdeburg, MSV Duisburg, FC Ingolstadt	VfL Osnabrück, Karlsruher SC, SV Wehen Wiesbaden
2019–20	Arminia Bielefeld, VfB Stuttgart	SV Wehen Wiesbaden, Dynamo Dresden	Würzburger Kickers, Eintracht Braunschweig
2020–21	VfL Bochum, Greuther Fürth	VfL Osnabrück (via play-off), Eintracht Braunschweig, Würzburger Kickers	Dynamo Dresden, Hansa Rostock, FC Ingolstadt
2021–22	Schalke 04, Werder Bremen	Dynamo Dresden (via play-off), Erzgebirge Aue, FC Ingolstadt	1. FC Magdeburg, Eintracht Braunschweig, 1. FC Kaiserslautern
2022–23	1. FC Heidenheim, Darmstadt 98	Arminia Bielefeld (via play-off), Jahn Regensburg, SV Sandhausen	SV Elversberg, VfL Osnabrück, Wehen Wiesbaden
2023–24	FC St. Pauli, Holstein Kiel	SV Wehen Wiesbaden (via play-off), Hansa Rostock, VfL Osnabrück	SSV Ulm, Preußen Münster
2024–25	1. FC Köln, Hamburger SV	SSV Ulm, Jahn Regensburg	Arminia Bielefeld, Dynamo Dresden
2025–26	Schalke 04, SV Elversberg, SC Paderborn	Fortuna Düsseldorf, Preußen Münster	VfL Osnabrück, Energie Cottbus

== Records ==
- The 2. Bundesliga is the only football league in Germany in which teams from all federal states have already played.
- Greuther Fürth has collected the most points as of the end of the 2022–23 season. Since 1974 the club has won 1,708 points in 1,160 second division games and has been leading the all-time table of the 2. Bundesliga since September 2017. This is followed by FC St. Pauli with 1,621 points from 1,096 games and Hannover 96 with 1,498 points from 988 games.
- Greuther Fürth have scored the most goals with 1,721 in 1,484 games.
- The best goal difference was achieved by Hannover 96 with +304.
- So far, eight clubs have moved straight through from the third division to the Bundesliga: 1860 Munich in 1994, Fortuna Düsseldorf in 1995, Arminia Bielefeld in 1996, 1. FC Nürnberg in 1998, SSV Ulm 1846 in 1999, 1899 Hoffenheim in 2008, Darmstadt 98 in 2015 and SC Paderborn in 2019.
- SC Fortuna Köln remained in the 2. Bundesliga for a record 26 years without interruption until 2000.
- Hertha BSC achieved the best single-season points record in the single-track 2. Bundesliga in the 2012–13 season, with 22 wins, 10 draws and 2 defeats, i.e. 76 points (three-point rule). However, this result was surpassed in absolute terms in the "unification season" 1992–93, when 24 teams played in the league and 46 match days took place.
- For a comparison of the season results in the 2. Bundesliga as a whole (both single and double track time), the figures relative to the number of games are more meaningful because the size of the league and the relays changed several times. Arminia Bielefeld achieved the best relative season result in the 1979–80 season with 78.9% wins, 15.8% draws and 5.3% defeats, 1,737: 0,263 points (two-point rule) or 2,526 points (three-point rule), 3,158: 0,816 goals, Goal difference +2,342. This is also the record for the absolute goal difference (+89). The best result in absolute points was that of Werder Bremen in 1980–81 (68:16 points, 98 according to the three-point rule – season size 22, i.e. 42 game days).
- Horst Hrubesch scored the most goals in one season for Rot-Weiss Essen (41 goals in the 1977–78 season).
- Hertha BSC scored the most goals in a single season with 123 in the 1980–81 season.
- Karlsruher SC was the only team to be in the promotion spot on all 34 game days of a second division season, in the 2006–07 season.
- Willi Landgraf played the most games in the 2. Bundesliga, with a total of 508 games for Rot-Weiss Essen (119), FC 08 Homburg (107), FC Gütersloh 2000 (94) and Alemannia Aachen (188). Landgraf never played in the Bundesliga, but he played for Alemannia Aachen in the UEFA Cup.
- Arminia Bielefeld celebrated the largest victory in the 2. Bundesliga in the 1979–80 season, an 11–0 win against SV Arminia Hannover. Four more games in the second division also ended with a double-digit result. FC St. Pauli won 10–2 in the 1974–75 season against VfL Wolfsburg and Freiburger FC against Würzburger FV in the 1979–80 season. SpVgg Bayern Hof defeated BSV 07 Schwenningen (1976–77) 10–1. Karlsruher SC recorded a 10–0 win against ESV Ingolstadt-Ringsee (1979–80 season). The largest victory after the introduction of the single-track 2. Bundesliga in 1981 was achieved by FC Hansa Rostock in the 2008–09 season with a 9–0 win against TuS Koblenz. A team left a total of five times as 8–0 winners, namely SV Waldhof Mannheim against BV Lüttringhausen (1982–83 season), Hannover 96 against Karlsruher SC (1986–87 season), SV Darmstadt 98 against FSV Salmrohr (also 1986–87 season), the Stuttgarter Kickers at SSV Ulm 1846 (1987–88 season) and SpVgg Unterhaching against 1. FC Saarbrücken (2001–02 season).
- The game with the most goals was a 7–6 win for 1. FC Kaiserslautern against SV Meppen on matchday 34 of the 1996–97 season.
- Benjamin Siegert from SV Wehen Wiesbaden scored not only the fastest goal in the history of the second division but also in German professional football after eight seconds in a 1–1 draw against Greuther Fürth on 5 October 2007. The most common pairings were SC Fortuna Köln against Hannover 96 and SG Wattenscheid 09 (40 games each in 20 seasons).
- The game with the highest number of spectators in the 2. Bundesliga was in the 2010–11 season, when 77,116 spectators saw the game between Hertha BSC and FC Augsburg. The lowest number of spectators was the game between Alemannia Aachen and 1. FC Nürnberg 2003–04, which was a ghost game with no spectators after fan riots occurred (this does not include matches played behind closed doors due to the COVID-19 pandemic).

=== Player records ===
==== Appearances ====
As of end of 2023–24 season.

Rank	Player	Apps	Years	Club(s)
1	(Germany) Willi Landgraf	508	1987–2006	Alemannia Aachen 188, Rot-Weiss Essen 119, FC Homburg 107, FC Gütersloh 94
2	(Spain) Joaquín Montañés	479	1974–1989	Alemannia Aachen 479
3	(Germany) Karl-Heinz Schulz	463	1977–1991	SC Freiburg 287, Freiburger FC 176
4	(Germany) Hans Wulf	440	1974–1989	Hessen Kassel 231, Schwarz-Weiß Essen 118, Wormatia Worms 59, Hannover 96 32
5	(Germany) Wolfgang Krüger	428	1975–1988	Union Solingen 428
6	(Germany) Hans-Jürgen Gede	416	1977–1990	Fortuna Köln 344, Preußen Münster 72
7	(Germany) Andreas Helmer	411	1983–1998	SV Meppen 244, VfL Osnabrück 167
8	(Germany) Gerd Paulus	407	1974–1989	Kickers Offenbach 304, SV Röchling Völklingen 103
9	(Germany) Oliver Posniak	403	1977–1989	Darmstadt 98 290, FSV Frankfurt 113
10	(Germany) Dirk Hupe	399	1975–1994	Fortuna Köln 212, Union Solingen 187

==== Top scorers ====
As of end of 2023–24 season.

Rank	Player	Goals	Apps	Ratio	Years	Club(s)
1	(Germany) Simon Terodde	177	311	0.57	2008–2024	VfL Bochum (41/66), Schalke 04 (35/58), 1. FC Köln (29/33), VfB Stuttgart (25/32), Hamburger SV (24/33), Union Berlin (23/87), MSV Duisburg (0/2)
2	(Germany) Dieter Schatzschneider	153	201	0.76	1978–1987	Hannover 96 (131/160), Fortuna Köln (22/41)
3	(Germany) Karl-Heinz Mödrath	150	272	0.55	1974–1983	Fortuna Köln (143/247), Alemannia Aachen (7/25)
4	(Germany) Theo Gries	123	293	0.42	1985–1994	Hertha BSC (67/148), Alemannia Aachen (47/125), Hannover 96 (8/20)
5	(Germany) Sven Demandt	121	317	0.38	1987–2001	Mainz 05 (55/179), Fortuna Düsseldorf (49/74), Hertha BSC (17/64)
6	(Germany) Walter Krause	120	273	0.44	1974–1983	Kickers Offenbach (98/237), Wattenscheid 09 (13/20), Rot-Weiß Oberhausen (9/16)
7	(Germany) Daniel Jurgeleit	117	393	0.30	1982–1997	Union Solingen (59/193), FC Homburg (34/133), VfB Lübeck (24/67)
8	(Germany) Gerd-Volker Schock	116	242	0.48	1974–1984	VfL Osnabrück (95/205), Arminia Bielefeld (21/37)
9	(Germany) Franz Gerber	115	213	0.54	1975–1987	FC St. Pauli (42/73), ESV Ingolstadt (23/36), Wuppertaler SV (19/32), 1860 Munich (19/35), Hannover 96 (12/37)
9	(Germany) Paul Linz	115	233	0.49	1979–1988	VfL Osnabrück (52/108), Freiburger FC (36/69), Waldhof Mannheim (16/37), OSC Bremerhaven (11/19)

=== Match records ===
Largest win
Arminia Bielefeld – Arminia Hannover 11–0 (23 May 1980)	11
Most goals in a game
1. FC Kaiserslautern – SV Meppen 7–6 (11 June 1997)	13
Most goals in a game for a player
Ottmar Hitzfeld – (VfB Stuttgart – Jahn Regensburg on 13 May 1977)	6

== Spectators ==
The spectator figures since 1992, when the league returned to the single division format:

Spectators
Season	Over all	Average	Best supported club	Average
1992–93	3,098,153	5,613	FC St. Pauli	14,120
1993–94	2,649,849	6,973	1860 Munich	19,553
1994–95	2,238,271	7,315	FC St. Pauli	17,211
1995–96	2,300,480	7,518	1. FC Nürnberg	16,465
1996–97	2,731,439	8,952	1.FC Kaiserslautern	36,680
1997–98	2,843,170	9,291	1. FC Nürnberg	24,759
1998–99	2,635,431	8,613	Hannover 96	19,229
1999–2000	3,735,624	12,208	1. FC Köln	28,853
2000–01	3,218,861	10,519	Borussia Mönchengladbach	23,458
2001–02	2,760,839	9,022	Hannover 96	20,562
2002–03	3,403,895	11,124	1. FC Köln	26,459
2003–04	2,911,457	9,515	1. FC Nürnberg	16,152
2004–05	4,135,108	13,513	1. FC Köln	38,482
2005–06	4,024,776	13,153	1860 Munich	41,932
2006–07	5,112,072	16,706	1. FC Köln	42,194
2007–08	5,551,586	18,142	1. FC Köln	43,763
2008–09	4,814,737	15,734	1. FC Kaiserslautern	34,409
2009–10	4,616,048	15,085	1. FC Kaiserslautern	35,398
2010–11	4,526,857	14,794	Hertha BSC	46,131
2011–12	5,276,103	17,242	Eintracht Frankfurt	37,641
2012–13	5,274,798	17,238	1. FC Köln	40,688
2013–14	5,475,652	17,894	1. FC Köln	46,176
2014–15	5,405,811	17,666	1. FC Kaiserslautern	33,013
2015–16	5,857,626	19,143	1. FC Nürnberg	30,723
2016–17	6,645,406	21,717	VfB Stuttgart	50,515
2017–18	5,380,757	17,584	1. FC Nürnberg	30,558
2018–19	5,853,246	19,128	1. FC Köln	49,547
2019–20	4,583,300	14,978	VfB Stuttgart	39,503
2020–21	104,547	342	Hannover 96	982
2021–22	4,123,434	13,699	Schalke 04	33,528
2022–23	6,800,413	22,224	Hamburger SV	53,529
2023–24	8,929,748	29,182	Schalke 04	61,502
2024–25	9,434,101	30,830	Schalke 04	61,619
2025–26	8,755,307	28,612	Schalke 04	61,700

== Top scorers ==
The ten most recent top goal scorers in the league:

Top scorers
Season	Top scorer(s)	Club(s)	Goals
2016–17	(Germany) Simon Terodde	VfB Stuttgart	25
2017–18	(Germany) Marvin Ducksch	Holstein Kiel	18
2018–19	(Germany) Simon Terodde	1. FC Köln	29
2019–20	(Germany) Fabian Klos	Arminia Bielefeld	21
2020–21	(Germany) Serdar Dursun	Darmstadt 98	27
2021–22	(Germany) Simon Terodde	Schalke 04	30
2022–23	(Germany) Tim Kleindienst	1. FC Heidenheim	25
2023–24	(Germany) Robert Glatzel / (Bosnia and Herzegovina) Haris Tabaković / (Greece) Christos Tzolis	Hamburger SV / Hertha BSC / Fortuna Düsseldorf	22
2024–25	(Germany) Davie Selke	Hamburger SV	22
2025–26	(Germany) Noel Futkeu	Greuther Fürth	19

== Second division in the European Cup ==
So far, clubs of the 2. Bundesliga have participated in the European Cup six times:

- After the East German DFV was incorporated into the now all-German DFB in 1991, the former DDR-Oberliga clubs FC Rot-Weiß Erfurt and Hallescher FC, which were integrated into the 2. Bundesliga, took part in the UEFA Cup in 1991–92. While Halle was eliminated in the first round against FC Torpedo Moscow, FC Rot-Weiß Erfurt lost to Ajax Amsterdam in the second round.
- In 1992–93, Hannover 96 took part in the European Cup Winners' Cup as DFB Cup winners. In the first round, despite a 2–1 in the second leg at home against defending champions Werder Bremen, due to a 1–3 defeat in the first leg, Hannover was narrowly eliminated from the competition.
- In 1996–97, the DFB Cup winners 1. FC Kaiserslautern took part in the European Cup Winners' Cup after being relegated to the 2. Bundesliga, but was also eliminated in the first round after a 1–0 and 0–4 nV against Red Star Belgrade.
- In 2001–02 season, the second division Union Berlin qualified for the UEFA Cup, as the team (still as a third division) was inferior to the Schalke 04 team in the cup final, but they took part in the Champions League through their runners-up. After a win against Haka Valkeakoski from Finland, the Berlin team was eliminated in the second round against the Bulgarian team PFC Litex Lovech.
- In 2004–05, Alemannia Aachen was also able to take part in the UEFA Cup as a defeated cup finalist, as cup winner Werder Bremen took part in the Champions League as champions. Alemannia Aachen reached the group stage against the Icelandic team FH Hafnarfjörður and even the round of the last 32 teams (round of 32) through victories against Lille and AEK Athens, but were eliminated after a 0–0 and 1–2 against AZ. Since 2014–15, only the victor of the cup final is allowed to participate in the UEFA Europa League.
