= List of clubs in the Oberliga Westfalen =

This is a List of clubs in the Oberliga Westfalen, including all clubs and their final placings from the inaugural season 1978–79 to the current one. The league, is the highest football league in the Westphalia (German: Westfalen) region of the state of North Rhine-Westphalia. It is one of fourteen Oberligas in German football, the fifth tier of the German football league system. Until the introduction of the 3. Liga in 2008 it was the fourth tier of the league system, until the introduction of the Regionalligas in 1994 the third tier. From 2008 to 2012 the league was defunct but then reformed again.

== Overview ==
The league was formed in 1978 to slot in above the Verbandsliga Westfalen which had been operating at this level up to then in two regional divisions. Originally it carried the name Amateur-Oberliga Westfalen. In 1994, when the Regionalliga West/Südwest was formed, the league changed its official name, now to Oberliga Westfalen, and became a tier four league. From 2000 onwards it became a feeder league to the Regionalliga Nord, after the Regionalliga West/Südwest had been disbanded. In 2008, when the Regionalliga West was introduced, the league was disbanded in favour of the NRW-Liga. The latter was disbanded again in 2012 and the Oberliga Westfalen reintroduced.

=== League timeline ===
The league went through the following timeline of name changes, format and position in the league system:

Years	Name	Tier	Promotion to
1978–81	Amateur-Oberliga Westfalen	III	2. Bundesliga Nord
1981–94	Amateur-Oberliga Westfalen	III	2. Bundesliga
1994–2000	Oberliga Westfalen	IV	Regionalliga West/Südwest
2000–2008	Oberliga Westfalen	IV	Regionalliga Nord
2012–	Oberliga Westfalen	V	Regionalliga West

== List of clubs ==
This is a complete list of clubs, as of the 2022–23 season, sorted by the last season a club played in the league:

Club	No	First	Last	Best	Titles	Seasons
FC Gütersloh	34	1978–79	Present	1st	2	1983–84, 1994–95
FC Eintracht Rheine^{3}	27	1978–79	Present	3rd	—	—
Sportfreunde Siegen	19	1978–79	Present	1st	2	1996–97, 2015–16
TSG Sprockhövel	15	2000–01	Present	3rd	—	—
SV Schermbeck	10	2003–04	Present	6th	—	—
Sportfreunde Lotte	4	2004–05	Present	4th	—	—
Delbrücker SC	3	2005–06	Present	9th	—	—
TuS Ennepetal	10	2012–13	Present	8th	—	—
TuS Erndtebrück	8	2012–13	Present	1st	2	2014–15, 2016–17
1. FC Gievenbeck	2	2012–13	Present	18th	—	—
Westfalia Rhynern	9	2012–13	Present	2nd	—	—
ASC 09 Dortmund	8	2014–15	Present	3rd	—	—
SC Paderborn 07 II	7	2015–16	Present	3rd	—	—
Preußen Münster II	3	2019–20	Present	10th	—	—
TSV Victoria Clarholz	2	2020–21	Present	15th	—	—
SG Finnentrop/Bamenohl	2	2020–21	Present	14th	—	—
SpVgg Vreden	2	2020–21	Present	8th	—	—
TuS Bövinghausen	0+	2022–23	Present	—	—	—
Westfalia Herne	26	1979–80	2021–22	2nd	—	—
Hammer SpVg	27	1980–81	2021–22	3rd	—	—
SG Wattenscheid 09	5	2004–05	2021–22	1st	1	2004–05
1. FC Kaan-Marienborn	5	2016–17	2021–22	1st	1	2021–22
TuS Haltern	4	2017–18	2021–22	2nd	—	—
Holzwickeder SC	4	2018–19	2021–22	2nd	—	—
RSV Meinerzhagen	3	2019–20	2021–22	3rd	—	—
Rot-Weiß Ahlen^{4}	7	1995–96	2019–20	1st	1	1995–96
SC Wiedenbrück	2	2007–08	2019–20	1st	1	2019–20
FC Schalke 04 II	15	1992–93	2018–19	1st	2	2002–03, 2018–19
FC Brünninghausen	3	2016–17	2018–19	7th	—	—
SC Hassel^{8}	10	1987–88	2017–18	7th	—	—
SV Lippstadt 08	15	1998–99	2017–18	1st	2	2012–13, 2017–18
Arminia Bielefeld II^{7}	11	2002–03	2017–18	1st	2	2003–04, 2013–14
TSV Marl-Hüls^{8}	3	2015–16	2017–18	4th	—	—
SpVgg Erkenschwick	26	1978–79	2016–17	1st	2	1979–80, 1986–87
SuS Stadtlohn	13	1994–95	2016–17	5th	—	—
SC Roland Beckum	5	2012–13	2016–17	4th	—	—
SuS Neuenkirchen	5	2012–13	2016–17	4th	—	—
SC Zweckel	3	2013–14	2015–16	14th	—	—
VfB Hüls	16	1990–91	2014–15	1st	1	1999–2000
TuS Heven	2	2012–13	2013–14	13th	—	—
SV Rödinghausen	1	2013–14	2013–14	2nd	—	—
Preußen Münster	13	1981–82	2007–08	1st	5	1987–88, 1988–89, 1991–92, 1992–93, 2007–08
VfL Bochum II	20	1982–83	2007–08	1st	1	1998–99
Sportfreunde Oestrich-Iserlohn	9	1995–96	2007–08	7th	—	—
Rot-Weiß Ahlen II	5	2003–04	2007–08	5th	—	—
Germania Gladbeck	1	2007–08	2007–08	7th	—	—
SC Verl	12	1986–87	2006–07	1st	2	1990–91, 2006–07
Borussia Dortmund II	13	1987–88	2005–06	1st	3	1997–98, 2001–02, 2005–06
Borussia Emsdetten	5	2002–03	2006–07	6th	—	—
VfB Fichte Bielefeld	5	2001–02	2005–06	4th	—	—
Sportfreunde Siegen II	4	2002–03	2005–06	10th	—	—
Vorwärts Kornharpen	2	2003–04	2004–05	9th	—	—
Lüner SV	5	1981–82	2003–04	9th	—	—
SG Wattenscheid 09 II^{6}	13	1986–87	2003–04	3rd	—	—
TSG Dülmen	8	1993–94	2002–03	5th	—	—
DJK TuS Hordel	7	1996–97	2002–03	4th	—	—
Preußen Lengerich	3	1999–2000	2001–02	13th	—	—
Hövelhofer SV	1	2001–02	2001–02	18th	—	—
SC Herford	8	1978–79	2000–01	1st	1	1978–79
SpVgg Beckum	13	1978–79	2000–01	3rd	—	—
SC Paderborn 07^{1}	10	1985–86	2000–01	1st	2	1993–94, 2000–01
VfB Kirchhellen	3	1998–99	2000–01	11th	—	—
SV Rotthausen	4	1995–96	1999–2000	7th	—	—
BW Post Recklinghausen	3	1997–98	1999–2000	5th	—	—
Hasper SV	5	1994–95	1998–99	2nd	—	—
BV Langendreer 04	2	1998–99	1998–99	14th	—	—
Sportfreunde Brackel	6	1992–93	1997–98	6th	—	—
SV Holzwickede	8	1978–79	1996–97	7th	—	—
Rot-Weiß Lüdenscheid	13	1981–82	1996–97	2nd	—	—
VfR Sölde^{5}	8	1989–90	1996–97	2nd	—	—
Rot-Weiß Lennestadt	2	1994–95	1995–96	10th	—	—
SV Blau-Weiß Wewer	2	1994–95	1995–96	14th	—	—
VfL Gevelsberg	8	1978–79	1994–95	2nd	—	—
SpVg Marl	7	1987–88	1993–94	6th	—	—
Arminia Bielefeld	6	1988–89	1993–94	1st	1	1989–90
DSC Wanne-Eickel	13	1980–81	1992–93	2nd	—	—
Eintracht Recklinghausen	7	1978–79	1991–92	6th	—	—
ASC Schöppingen^{2}	10	1982–83	1991–92	1st	1	1985–86
VfL Reken	4	1984–85	1987–88	10th	—	—
SuS Hüsten 09	8	1978–79	1986–87	4th	—	—
Eintracht Hamm	6	1981–82	1986–87	1st	2	1982–83, 1984–85
DJK Hellweg Lütgendortmund	7	1978–79	1985–86	6th	—	—
1. FC Paderborn^{1}	7	1978–79	1984–85	1st	1	1980–81
TuS Schloß Neuhaus^{1}	6	1978–79	1984–85	1st	1	1981–82
VfB Waltrop	6	1979–80	1984–85	4th	—	—
FC Gohfeld	2	1983–84	1984–85	15th	—	—
Teutonia Lippstadt	4	1979–80	1982–83	11th	—	—
STV Horst-Emscher	2	1980–81	1981–82	14th	—	—
Bünder SV	3	1978–79	1980–81	9th	—	—
VfB Altena	3	1978–79	1980–81	13th	—	—
TSG Harsewinkel	2	1978–79	1979–80	10th	—	—
SpVgg Emsdetten	2	1978–79	1979–80	16th	—	—
SV Ahlen	1	1978–79	1978–79	17th	—	—

=== Key ===
Denotes club plays in a league above the Oberliga Westfalen in 2022–23.	Denotes club plays in the Oberliga Westfalen in 2022–23.	Denotes club plays in a league below the Westfalen in 2022–23.

Club	Name of club
No	Number of seasons in league
First	First season in league
Last	Last season in league
Best	Best result in league
Titles	Number of league titles won
Seasons	Seasons league titles were won in

=== Notes ===
- ^{1} In 1985 Tus Schloß Neuhaus merged with FC Paderborn to form TuS Paderborn-Neuhaus. In 1997 the club changed its name to SC Paderborn 07.
- ^{2} In 1992 ASC Schöppingen withdrew from the league.
- ^{3} In 1994 VfB Rheine changed its name to Eintracht Rheine.
- ^{4} In 1996 Tus Ahlen and BW Ahlen merged to form LR Ahlen, which changed its name to Rot-Weiß Ahlen in 2006.
- ^{5} In 1997 VfR Sölde withdrew from the league.
- ^{6} In 2004 SG Wattenscheid 09 II had to withdraw from the league because the first team of the club was relegated to the Oberliga.
- ^{7} In 2014 Arminia Bielefeld II was ineligible for promotion as the senior team played in the 3. Liga and the reserve team of a 3. Liga clubs could not enter the Regionalliga. In 2018 Arminia II withdrew from the league.
- ^{8} In 2017 SC Hassel and TSV Marl-Hüls withdrew from the league.

== League placings ==
The complete list of clubs in the league and their league placings.

=== Amateur-Oberliga Westfalen ===
The complete list of clubs and placings in the league while operating as the tier three Amateur-Oberliga Westfalen from 1978 to 1994:

Club	79	80	81	82	83	84	85	86	87	88	89	90	91	92	93	94
SC Paderborn 07								2	6	8	9	2	8	5	5	1
Preußen Münster	2B	2B	2B	5	3	3	4	5	2	1	1	2B	2B	1	1	2
Arminia Bielefeld	B	2B	B	B	B	B	B	2B	2B	2B	2	1	5	4	3	3
SpVgg Erkenschwick	3	1	2B	3	10	7	10	7	1	5	11	11	10	6	7	4
SC Verl									9	13	7	6	1	3	2	5
SG Wattenscheid 09 II									5	4	15				10	6
VfL Gevelsberg	11	3	2	18										12	8	7
Borussia Dortmund II										10	4	10	4	10	4	8
FC Gütersloh	4	6	4	2	6	1	14	3	8	6	6	15		11	13	9
VfR Sölde												5	3	2	14	10
SpVgg Beckum	18											8	9	14	11	11
Sportfreunde Brackel															9	12
FC Schalke 04 II															12	13
SV Holzwickede	7	7	15	20												14
TSG Dülmen																15
SpVg Marl										12	8	7	12	8	6	16
Sportfreunde Siegen	15	4	7	4	5	13	12	16			16				15	
DSC Wanne-Eickel	2B	2B	5	11	9	8	2	4	4	11	14	4	13	9	16	
Rot-Weiß Lüdenscheid	2B	2B	2B	8	2	10	11	12	11	16			11	15	17	
VfL Bochum II					13	11	7	11	13	14		9	7	13	18	
ASC Schöppingen					7	12	3	1	7	3	3	3	2	7		
Eintracht Recklinghausen	8	11	16					10	15				6	16		
VfB Hüls													14			
SC Hassel										7	12	12	15			
FC Eintracht Rheine	14	14	6	9	16						10	13	16			
Hammer SpVg			8	10	14	14	6	13	12	9	13	14				
Westfalia Herne	2B	9	12	17	15	16	9	6	3	2	5	16				
VfL Reken							13	14	10	15						
SuS Hüsten 09	12	10	10	16	4	17		8	14							
Eintracht Hamm				6	1	2	1	9	16							
SC Herford	1	2B	2B	14	11	6	8	15								
DJK Hellweg Lütgendortmund	6	8	13	12	18		16	17								
TuS Schloß Neuhaus	2	5	3	1	2B	5	5									
1. FC Paderborn	5	2	1	15	12	9	15									
VfB Waltrop		16	9	7	8	4	17									
FC Gohfeld						15	18									
BV Langendreer 04						18										
Teutonia Lippstadt		15	11	13	17											
Lüner SV				19												
STV Horst-Emscher			14	21												
VfB Altena	13	13	17													
Bünder SV	9	12	18													
SpVgg Emsdetten	16	17														
TSG Harsewinkel	10	18														
SV Ahlen	17															

=== Oberliga Westfalen 1994–2008 ===
The complete list of clubs and placings in the league while operating as the tier four (1994–2008) and five (2008–2012) Oberliga Westfalen:

Club	95	96	97	98	99	00	01	02	03	04	05	06	07	08
SC Paderborn 07	R	R	R	R	R	R	1	R	R	R	R	2B	2B	2B
Rot-Weiß Ahlen		1	R	R	R	R	2B	2B	2B	2B	2B	2B	R	R
Sportfreunde Siegen	7	2	1	R	R	R	R	R	R	R	R	2B	R	R
Borussia Dortmund II	2	4	3	1	R	R	R	1	R	R	R	1	R	R
SC Verl	R	R	R	R	R	R	R	R	R	2	5	2	1	R
Preußen Münster	R	R	R	R	R	R	R	R	R	R	R	R	6	1
FC Schalke 04 II	15			2	2	2	5	2	1	R	3	3	2	2
VfL Bochum II				4	1	R	2	5	2	3	2	6	10	3
Sportfreunde Lotte											8	5	8	4
Westfalia Herne						5	8	6	17			8	7	5
SV Schermbeck										13	13	17		6
Germania Gladbeck														7
Hammer SpVg	11	6	9	10	16								14	8
Delbrücker SC												12	9	9
FC Gütersloh	1	R	2B	2B	2B	R	4	9	3	8	10	4	5	10
Arminia Bielefeld II									14	1	R	9	3	11
SpVgg Erkenschwick	R	R	R	R	R	15					12	15	12	12
Rot-Weiß Ahlen II										5	7	11	15	13
Sportfreunde Oestrich-Iserlohn		7	10	7	12	11	14	17					13	14
FC Eintracht Rheine					9	8	7	3	5	10	9	14	11	15
SV Lippstadt 08					3	3	11	14	4	11	15	13	4	16
SC Wiedenbrück														17
TSG Sprockhövel							16		15	16	16			18
SG Wattenscheid 09	2B	2B	R	2B	2B	R	R	R	R	R	1	R	16	
Borussia Emsdetten									12	14	6	10	17	
VfB Hüls	12	14	12	12	4	1	3	4	7	6	4	7	18	
Sportfreunde Siegen II									10	15	14	16		
VfB Fichte Bielefeld								7	9	4	11	18		
Vorwärts Kornharpen										9	17			
SC Hassel								8	11	7	18			
SG Wattenscheid 09 II	R	R	8	3	6	7	6	12	6	12				
SuS Stadtlohn	8	5	13	8	8	9	13	13	8	17				
Lüner SV							9	10	13	18				
DJK TuS Hordel			4	13	10	6	10	11	16					
TSG Dülmen			5	9	7	10	12	15	18					
Preußen Lengerich						13	15	16						
Hövelhofer SV								18						
SC Herford						4	17							
SpVgg Beckum	3	8	14	11	13	14	18							
VfB Kirchhellen					11	12	19							
BW Post Recklinghausen				6	5	16								
SV Rotthausen		12	7	14		17								
BV Langendreer 04					14									
Hasper SV	5	3	2	5	15									
Sportfreunde Brackel	6	11	11	15										
VfR Sölde	9	9	6											
Rot-Weiß Lüdenscheid	4	10	15											
SV Holzwickede	13	13	16											
Rot-Weiß Lennestadt	10	15												
SV Blau-Weiß Wewer	14	16												
VfL Gevelsberg	16													

=== Oberliga Westfalen 2012–present ===
The complete list of clubs and placings in the league while operating as the reformed tier five Oberliga Westfalen:

Club	13	14	15	16	17	18	19	20	21	22	23
Sportfreunde Lotte	R	R	R	R	3L	3L	3L	R	R	R	x
SV Rödinghausen		2	R	R	R	R	R	R	R	R	R
SV Lippstadt 08	1	R	5	6	6	1	R	R	R	R	R
FC Schalke 04 II	R	R	R	R	R	6	1	R	R	R	R
Rot-Weiss Ahlen	9	9	2	R	R	14	9	2	R	R	R
1. FC Kaan-Marienborn					7	2	R	9	6	1	R
SG Wattenscheid 09	2	R	R	R	R	R	R	R	9	2	R
SC Paderborn 07 II				16	12	13	7	6	15	3	x
Westfalia Rhynern	6	7	3	5	2	R	5	5	3	4	x
FC Gütersloh 2000	8	10	13	12	10	16	10	11	1	5	x
ASC 09 Dortmund			12	15	14	3	3	13	5	6	x
Eintracht Rheine		8	10	7	5	8	15	4	18	7	x
TuS Erndtebrück	4	5	1	R	1	R	14	17	14	8	x
Sportfreunde Siegen	R	R	R	1	R	11	12	14	10	9	x
SV Schermbeck	17			17			6	12	16	10	x
SpVgg Vreden									8	11	x
Preußen Münster II								10	11	12	x
TSG Sprockhövel	10	11	14	3	R	10	4	15	4	13	x
SG Finnentrop/Bamenohl									17	14	x
TSV Victoria Clarholz									19	15	x
TuS Ennepetal	14	12	9	11	9	12	13	8	12	16	x
RSV Meinerzhagen								3	7	17	
Hammer SpVg	12	13	11	14	3	4	16	18	21	18	
Holzwickeder SC							11	7	2	19	
TuS Haltern						5	2	R	13	20	
Westfalia Herne	16	15	18			9	8	16	20	21	
FC Brünninghausen					11	7	17				
1. FC Gievenbeck	18						18				x
Arminia Bielefeld II	3	1	8	10	13	15					
SC Hassel					8	17					
TSV Marl-Hüls				9	4	18					
SuS Neuenkirchen	7	4	15	8	15						
SC Roland Beckum	11	6	4	4	16						
SuS Stadtlohn			7	13	17						
SpVgg Erkenschwick	5	3	6	2	18						
SC Zweckel		14	17	18							
VfB Hüls	R	16	16								
TuS Heven	13	17									
TuS Dornberg	15	18									
TuS Bövinghausen											x
Delbrücker SC											x
