= 2014–15 Oberliga Westfalen =

Oberliga Westfalen
- Season: 2014–15
- Champions: TuS Erndtebrück
- Promoted: TuS Erndtebrück Rot Weiss Ahlen
- Relegated: VfB Hüls Westfalia Herne
- Matches: 306
- Top goalscorer: Stefan Oerterer (30 goals)
- Total attendance: 118,454
- Average attendance: 387

The 2014–15 season of the Oberliga Westfalen, the highest association football league in the Westphalia region of the state of North Rhine-Westphalia, was the third season of the league at tier five (V) of the German football league system and the 33rd season overall since establishment of the league in 1978. The league was defunct from 2008 to 2012, when it was re-established.

The season began on 15 August 2014 and finished on 14 June 2015.

The champions and runners-up of the league were promoted to the Regionalliga West. Additionally the league champion also qualified directly for the first round of the 2015–16 DFB-Pokal.

== League table ==
The 2014–15 season saw three new clubs in the league, SuS Stadtlohn and ASC 09 Dortmund, both promoted from the Westfalenliga, while SV Lippstadt 08 had been relegated from the Regionalliga West to the league.

Pos	Team	Pld	W	D	L	GF	GA	GD	Pts	Promotion or relegation
1	TuS Erndtebrück (C, P)	34	22	7	5	72	22	+50	73	Promotion to Regionalliga West
2	Rot Weiss Ahlen (P)	34	22	4	8	72	39	+33	70	Promotion to Regionalliga West
3	Westfalia Rhynern	34	20	4	10	73	36	+37	64	
4	SC Roland Beckum	34	20	4	10	61	38	+23	64	
5	SV Lippstadt 08	34	16	12	6	66	36	+30	60	
6	SpVgg Erkenschwick	34	16	11	7	54	33	+21	59	
7	SuS Stadtlohn	34	15	4	15	52	59	−7	49	
8	Arminia Bielefeld II	34	15	3	16	61	57	+4	48	
9	TuS Ennepetal	34	12	9	13	52	57	−5	45	
10	FC Eintracht Rheine	34	13	4	17	56	65	−9	43	
11	Hammer SpVg	34	12	7	15	44	61	−17	43	
12	ASC 09 Dortmund	34	12	6	16	58	73	−15	42	
13	FC Gütersloh 2000	34	9	11	14	37	51	−14	38	
14	TSG Sprockhövel	34	8	10	16	39	62	−23	34	
15	SuS Neuenkirchen	34	8	9	17	42	67	−25	33	
16	VfB Hüls (Note: VfB Hüls withdrew from the league at the end of the season for financial reasons.) (R)	34	7	9	18	53	79	−26	30	Relegation to Westfalenliga
17	SV Zweckel	34	6	11	17	33	60	−27	29	
18	Westfalia Herne (R)	34	7	7	20	40	70	−30	28	Relegation to Westfalenliga

Source: kicker.de, soccerway.com
Rules for classification: 1) Points; 2) Goal difference; 3) Goals scored; 4) head-to-head results; 5) goals scored away from home against opponent; 6) goals scored away from home; 7) drawing of lots
(C) Champions; (P) Promoted; (R) Relegated

=== Top goalscorers ===
The top goal scorers for the season:

Rank	Player	Club	Goals
1	(Germany) Stefan Oerterer	SpVgg Erkenschwick	30
2	(Croatia) Damir Ivancicevic	Rot Weiss Ahlen	25
3	(Germany) Laurenz Wassinger	TuS Erndtebrück	23
4	(Germany) Timo Scherping	FC Eintracht Rheine	21

== Promotion play-off ==
The runners-up of the two divisions of the Westfalenliga competed for one more spot in the Oberliga.

Team 1	Score	Team 2
SV Schermbeck	3–0	BV Westfalia Wickede
