= 2015–16 Oberliga Westfalen =

Oberliga Westfalen
- Season: 2015–16
- Champions: Sportfreunde Siegen
- Promoted: Sportfreunde Siegen TSG Sprockhövel
- Relegated: SV Schermbeck SV Zweckel
- Matches: 302
- Top goalscorer: Stefan Oerterer, Michael Smykacz (23 goals)
- Total attendance: 101,532
- Average attendance: 336

The 2015–16 season of the Oberliga Westfalen, the highest association football league in the Westphalia region of the state of North Rhine-Westphalia, was the fourth season of the league at tier five (V) of the German football league system and the 34th season overall since establishment of the league in 1978. The league went defunct from 2008 to 2012, when it was re-established.

The season began on 14 August 2015 and finished on 29 May 2016.

== Standings ==
The league featured four new clubs for the 2015–16 season with TSV Marl-Hüls promoted as champions of the Westfalenliga I, SC Paderborn 07 II as champions of the Westfalenliga II and SV Schermbeck in the promotion round of the Westfalenliga runners-up while Sportfreunde Siegen had been relegated from the Regionalliga West.

Pos	Team	Pld	W	D	L	GF	GA	GD	Pts	Promotion, qualification or relegation
1	Sportfreunde Siegen (C, P)	34	19	7	8	59	31	+28	64	Promotion to Regionalliga West and qualification to DFB-Pokal play-off
2	SpVgg Erkenschwick (Note: SpVgg Erkenschwick did not apply for a Regionalliga licence, third-placed TSG Sprockhövel promoted instead.)	34	19	6	9	62	38	+24	63	
3	TSG Sprockhövel (P)	34	18	7	9	73	48	+25	61	Promotion to Regionalliga West
4	SC Roland Beckum	34	17	9	8	67	48	+19	60	
5	Westfalia Rhynern	34	18	5	11	78	50	+28	59	
6	SV Lippstadt 08	34	16	7	11	58	44	+14	55	
7	FC Eintracht Rheine	34	16	7	11	59	54	+5	55	
8	SuS Neuenkirchen	34	15	7	12	66	63	+3	52	
9	TSV Marl-Hüls	34	15	3	16	66	65	+1	48	
10	Arminia Bielefeld II	34	13	4	17	57	58	−1	43	
11	TuS Ennepetal	34	11	9	14	62	60	+2	42	
12	FC Gütersloh 2000	34	12	6	16	52	61	−9	42	
13	SuS Stadtlohn	34	12	6	16	49	60	−11	42	
14	Hammer SpVg	34	11	8	15	50	65	−15	41	
15	ASC 09 Dortmund	34	12	2	20	55	87	−32	38	
16	SC Paderborn 07 II	34	9	9	16	49	63	−14	36	
17	SV Schermbeck (R)	34	7	10	17	49	78	−29	31	Relegation to Westfalenliga
18	SV Zweckel (R)	34	8	4	22	40	78	−38	28	Relegation to Westfalenliga

Source: kicker.de, soccerway.com
Rules for classification: 1) Points; 2) Goal difference; 3) Goals scored; 4) head-to-head results; 5) goals scored away from home against opponent; 6) goals scored away from home; 7) drawing of lots
(C) Champions; (P) Promoted; (R) Relegated

=== Top goalscorers ===
The top goal scorers for the season:

Rank	Player	Club	Goals
1	(Germany) Michael Smykacz	TSV Marl-Hüls	23
1	(Germany) Stefan Oerterer	SpVgg Erkenschwick	23
3	(Germany) Lennard Kleine	Westfalia Rhynern	20
4	(Ivory Coast) Ouly Hugues Magouhi	Hammer SpVg	18
5	(Morocco) Abdelhamid Sabiri	Sportfreunde Siegen	17

== Promotion play-off ==
The runners-up of the two divisions of the Westfalenliga competed for one more spot in the Oberliga.

Team 1	Score	Team 2
Delbrücker SC	1–4	1. FC Kaan-Marienborn
