= 2015–16 Oberliga =

Tournament details
- Country: Germany

Final positions
- Champions: 14 regional winners

The 2015–16 season of the Oberliga was the eighth season of the Oberligas at tier five of the German football league system and the 42nd season overall since reintroduction of the Oberligas in 1974. The regular season started on 17 July 2015 and finished on 12 June 2016.

The Oberliga is organised in fourteen regional divisions with the league champions promoted to the level above, the Regionalligas while the relegated teams drop down to the Verbandsligas and Landesligas.

== Overview ==
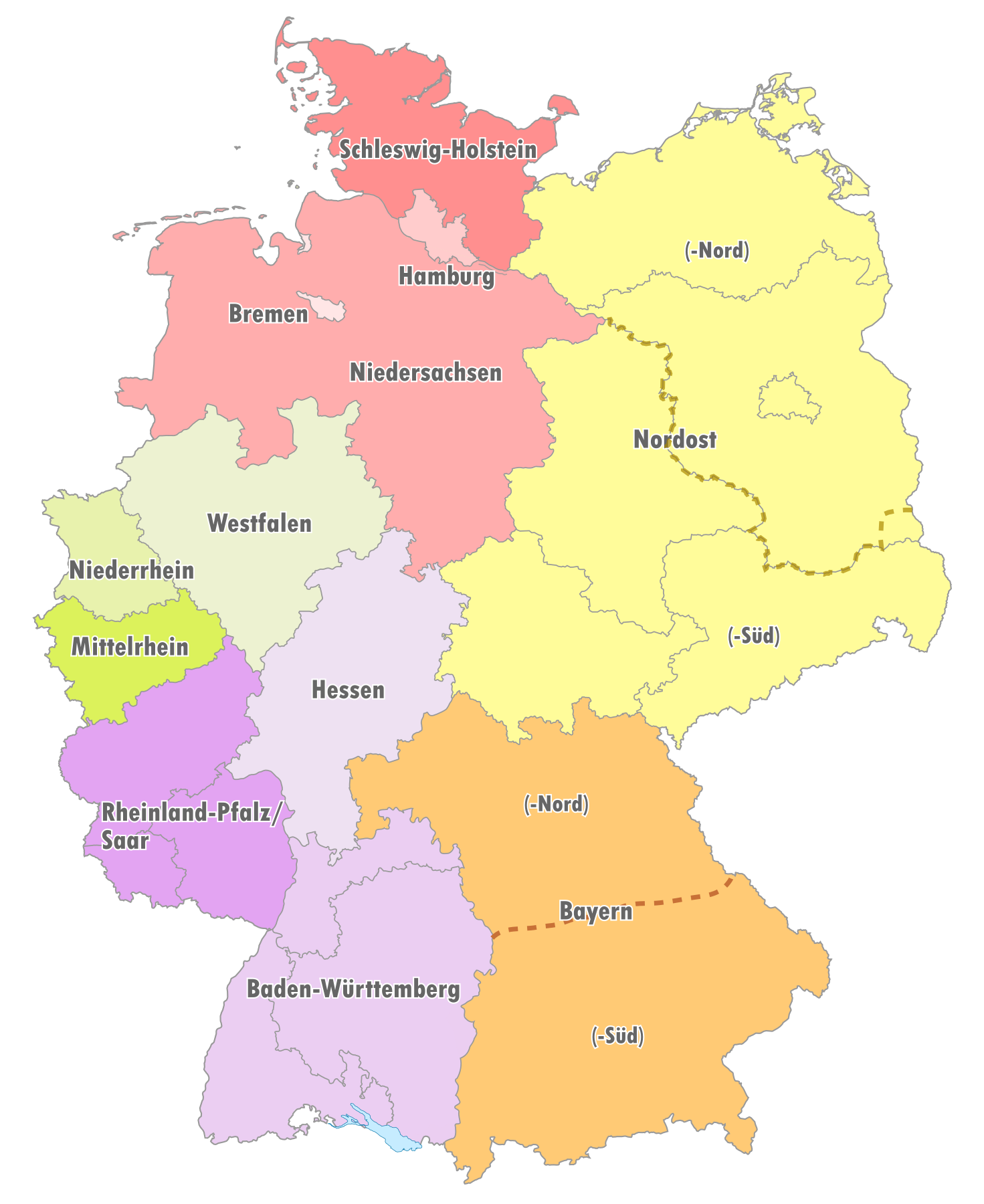
The fourteen Oberligas in Germany in 2015–16

In the 2015–16 season 241 clubs compete in the Oberligas, two less than in the previous season.

Eleven of the league champions earned direct promotion to the Regionalligas, Bonner SC, Wuppertaler SV, SSV Ulm 1846, SV Seligenporten, VfR Garching, Teutonia Watzenborn-Steinberg, Lupo Martini Wolfsburg, TuS Koblenz, Sportfreunde Siegen, 1. FC Lokomotive Leipzig and FSV Union Fürstenwalde, while third-placed Oberliga Westfalen club TSG Sprockhövel was also directly promoted as the second-placed team, SpVgg Erkenschwick, declined to apply for a Regionalliga licence. In Northern Germany Bremer SV, Germania Egestorf, Altona 93 and SV Eichede competed for two more Regionalliga Nord places in a play-off, which Eichede and Egestorf won, while FC Nöttingen, SC Hauenstein and Rot-Weiss Frankfurt did the same for the Regionalliga Südwest, with Nöttingen earning promotion. In the Regionalliga Bayern promotion/relegation play-off SpVgg Bayern Hof and TSV 1860 Rosenheim earned promotion while FC Augsburg II defended their league place and Viktoria Aschaffenburg was relegated. Of the 45 clubs leaving the Oberliga 38 were relegated while 7 withdrew from the leagues.

1. FC Lokomotive Leipzig became the only Oberliga team to finish the season undefeated, winning 22 and drawing 8 of their 30 NOFV-Oberliga Süd matches. SV Eichede accumulated the highest points total, 81, while Bremer SV scored the most goals, 120. SV Lurup of the Oberliga Hamburg held the distinction of being the worst Oberliga club in 2015–16, losing 33 of its 34-season games and drawing one, remaining without a win all season. The club scored just 13 goals and conceded 252 but earned the respect of the other league clubs in Hamburg by not withdrawing and completing the season.

== 2015–16 season ==
The 2015–16 league champions, promoted and relegated teams, the league strength (S), the top scorer and the number of goals they scored, as far as has been determined:

Oberliga	Champions	Promoted	Relegated	S	Top scorer	Goals
Oberliga Baden-Württemberg 2015–16 season	SSV Ulm 1846	SSV Ulm 1846 FC Nöttingen	Freiburger FC Kehler FV SGV Freiberg FC 08 Villingen Germania Friedrichstal SC Pfullendorf	18	David Braig (Ulm)	26
Bayernliga Nord 2015–16 season	SV Seligenporten	SV Seligenporten SpVgg Bayern Hof	ASV Burglengenfeld Eintracht Bamberg Jahn Forchheim	18	Christian Breunig (Hai)	29
Bayernliga Süd 2015–16 season	VfR Garching	VfR Garching TSV 1860 Rosenheim	SV Erlbach SpVgg Ruhmannsfelden	18	Dennis Niebauer (Gar)	25
Bremen-Liga 2015–16 season	Bremer SV	—	Union 60 Bremen KSV Vatan Sport	16	Bashkim Toski (Gro)	34
Oberliga Hamburg 2015–16 season	TuS Dassendorf	—	Meiendorfer SV USC Paloma SV Lurup	18	Benjamin Bambur (WTC)	28
Hessenliga 2015–16 season	Teutonia Watzenborn-Steinberg	Teutonia Watzenborn-Steinberg	1. FC Eschborn^{†}; SV Wiesbaden^{†} SpVgg 05 Oberrad SV Buchonia Flieden	17	Rafael Szymanski (TWS)	25
Mittelrheinliga 2015–16 season	Bonner SC	Bonner SC	Alemannia Aachen II VfL Leverkusen SV Breining SV Eilendorf	16	Bayram Ilk (VfL)	28
Niedersachsenliga 2015–16 season	Lupo Martini Wolfsburg	Lupo Martini Wolfsburg Germania Egestorf	TuS Lingen^{†} VfL Bückeburg Teutonia Uelzen	16	Keven Oltmer (SSV)	21
NOFV-Oberliga Nord 2015–16 season	FSV Union Fürstenwalde	FSV Union Fürstenwalde	FC Neubrandenburg BSV Hürtürkel	16	Tobias Täge (MSV)	30
NOFV-Oberliga Süd 2015–16 season	1. FC Lokomotive Leipzig	1. FC Lokomotive Leipzig	Rot-Weiß Erfurt II^{†} FC Energie Cottbus II^{†} FC Eisenach	16	Patrik Schlegel (AB)	22
Oberliga Niederrhein 2015–16 season	Wuppertaler SV	Wuppertaler SV	MSV Duisburg II^{†}: 1. FC Mönchengladbach; RW Oberhausen II TV Kalkum-Wittlaer	18	Philipp Goris (1.FC)	20
Oberliga Rheinland-Pfalz/Saar 2015–16 season	TuS Koblenz	TuS Koblenz	SpVgg EGC Wirges^{†} SV Elversberg II SV Mehring SVN Zweibrücken^{†}	18	Björn Recktenwald (FCH)	27
Schleswig-Holstein-Liga 2015–16 season	SV Eichede	SV Eichede	Preetzer TSV SV Henstedt-Ulzburg TuRa Meldorf SG Reher-Puls	18	Morten Liebert (SVT)	37
Oberliga Westfalen 2015–16 season	Sportfreunde Siegen	Sportfreunde Siegen TSG Sprockhövel	SV Schermbeck SV Zweckel	18	Stefan Oerterer (ERKT) Michael Smykacz (TSV)	23

- ^{‡} Denotes club declined promotion.
- ^{†} Denotes club withdrew from league.
- ^{¶} Denotes club failed to win promotion.
- ^{#} Denotes club was ineligible for promotion.

== Promotion play-off ==
For three of the five Regionalligas promotion play-off were held for qualified Oberliga teams. The other two Regionalligas, Nordost and West, did not hold play-off rounds, instead operating with direct promotion only.

=== Regionalliga Bayern ===
The 15th and 16th placed Regionalliga teams, Viktoria Aschaffenburg and FC Augsburg II, played the third-placed teams of the northern and southern divisions. The winners of these games were qualified for the 2016–17 Regionalliga, the losers played each other for one more spot in the Regionalliga after Jahn Regensburg was successful in winning promotion to the 3. Liga. The third placed teams that qualified are SpVgg Bayern Hof in the north and TSV 1860 Rosenheim in the south as the runners-up of the two Bayernliga divisions did not apply for a Regionalliga licence.

Round one

Team 1	Agg.	Team 2	1st leg	2nd leg
SpVgg Bayern Hof	4–2	Viktoria Aschaffenburg	2–1	2–1
TSV 1860 Rosenheim	2–2 (a)	FC Augsburg II	2–1	0–1

Round two

Team 1	Agg.	Team 2	1st leg	2nd leg
TSV 1860 Rosenheim	1–0	Viktoria Aschaffenburg	0–0	1–0

=== Regionalliga Nord ===
Promotion play-off were to be held at the end of the season to the Regionalliga Nord. The runners-up of the Niedersachsenliga and the champions or, in Hamburg's case, the only team applying for a licence, of the Bremen-Liga, Oberliga Hamburg and Schleswig-Holstein-Liga played each other for two more spot in the Regionalliga. In the promotion round each team met the other just once with the two highest-placed teams in the final table promoted:

Pos	Team	Pld	W	D	L	GF	GA	GD	Pts	Promotion	GER	SVE	ALT	BSV
1	Germania Egestorf (P)	3	1	2	0	5	4	+1	5	Promotion to Regionalliga	—	2–2	2–1	—
2	SV Eichede (P)	3	1	2	0	5	4	+1	5	Promotion to Regionalliga	—	—	—	2–1
3	Altona 93	3	1	1	1	4	3	+1	4		—	1–1	—	—
4	Bremer SV	3	0	1	2	2	5	−3	1		1–1	—	0–2	—

Source: Weltfussball.de
Rules for classification: 1) Points; 2) Head-to-head; 3) Decider;
(P) Promoted

=== Regionalliga Südwest ===
The runners-up of the Hessenliga, Oberliga Baden-Württemberg and Oberliga Rheinland-Pfalz/Saar competed for one more spot in the Regionalliga Südwest, with each team playing the other just once:

Pos	Team	Pld	W	D	L	GF	GA	GD	Pts	Promotion	FCN	RWF	SCH
1	FC Nöttingen (P)	2	1	1	0	7	6	+1	4	Promotion to Regionalliga	—	3–2	—
2	Rot-Weiss Frankfurt	2	1	0	1	5	5	0	3		—	—	3–2
3	SC Hauenstein	2	0	1	1	6	7	−1	1		4–4	—	—

Source: Weltfussball.de
Rules for classification: 1) Points; 2) Head-to-head; 3) Decider;
(P) Promoted
