= Christian Erwig =

German football player

Personal information
- Date of birth: 16 February 1983 (age 43)
- Place of birth: Dorsten, West Germany
- Height: 1.84 m (6 ft 0 in)
- Position: Striker

Youth career
- JSG Hülsten/Maria Veen
- Westfalia Groß-Reken
- Westfalia Gemen
- SC Preußen Münster

Senior career*
| Years | Team | Apps | (Gls) |
| 2002–2003 | SC Preußen Münster | 0 | (0) |
| 2003–2004 | SuS Stadtlohn | 30 | (8) |
| 2004–2005 | SV Schermbeck | 32 | (19) |
| 2005–2007 | FC Schalke 04 II | 41 | (25) |
| 2006–2007 | FC Schalke 04 | 1 | (0) |
| 2007–2008 | Fortuna Düsseldorf | 30 | (2) |
| 2008–2010 | FC Schalke 04 II | 26 | (10) |
| 2010–2011 | Sportfreunde Lotte | 25 | (5) |
| 2011–2013 | VfB Hüls | 60 | (40) |
| 2013–2016 | TSV Marl-Hüls | 54 | (49) |
| 2016 | SuS Stadtlohn | 13 | (8) |
| 2016–2020 | SC Reken | 21 | (10) |
| Total | | 333 | (176) |

Managerial career
- 2017–2020: SC Reken
- * Club domestic league appearances and goals

Christian Erwig (born 16 February 1983 in Dorsten) is a German retired footballer.

== Career ==
He made his Bundesliga debut on 25 February 2007, when he came on as a substitute in the 87th minute for FC Schalke 04 in a game against Bayer 04 Leverkusen, replacing Halil Altıntop.

== Honours ==
- Bundesliga runner-up: 2006–07
