= Marco Stiepermann =

German footballer (born 1991)

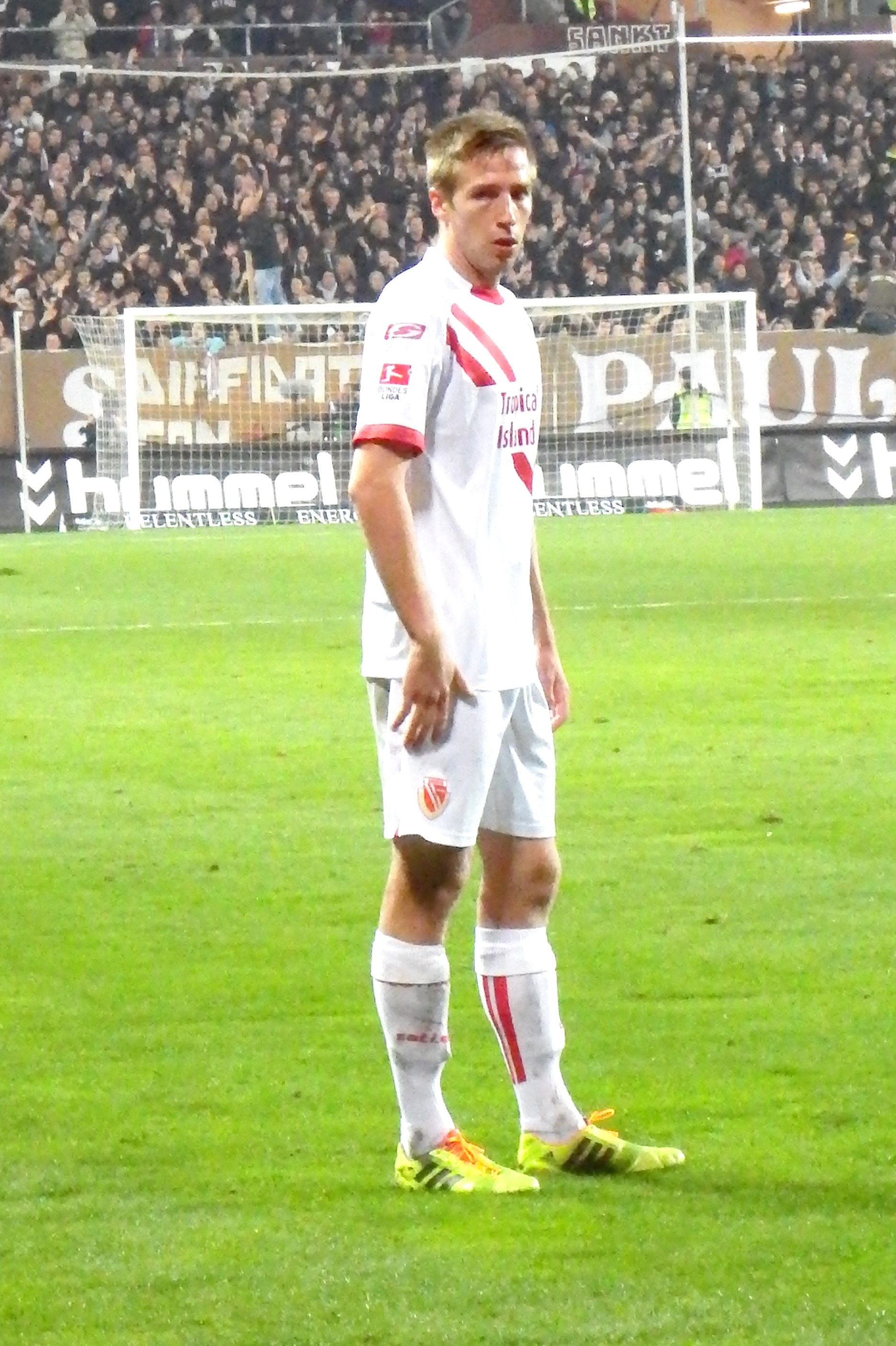
- Stiepermann with Energie Cottbus in 2013

Personal information
- Full name: Marco Stiepermann
- Date of birth: 9 February 1991 (age 35)
- Place of birth: Dortmund, Germany
- Position: Attacking midfielder

Team information
- Current team: Westfalia Rhynern (manager)

Youth career
- 1998–2010: Borussia Dortmund

Senior career*
Years	Team	Apps	(Gls)
2009–2011	Borussia Dortmund II	33	(5)
2009–2012	Borussia Dortmund	7	(1)
2011–2012	→ Alemannia Aachen (loan)	21	(2)
2011–2012	→ Alemannia Aachen II (loan)	8	(0)
2012–2014	Energie Cottbus	56	(7)
2013	→ Energie Cottbus II	2	(1)
2014–2016	Greuther Fürth	61	(9)
2015	→ Greuther Fürth II	1	(1)
2016–2017	VfL Bochum	31	(1)
2017–2021	Norwich City	108	(11)
2021–2022	SC Paderborn	16	(3)
2022–2023	Wuppertaler SV	26	(7)
2023–2025	ASC 09 Dortmund	26	(6)

International career
2005–2006	Germany U15	5	(2)
2006–2007	Germany U16	11	(5)
2007–2008	Germany U17	11	(1)
2008–2009	Germany U18	12	(0)
2009–2010	Germany U19	11	(2)
2010–2011	Germany U20	3	(1)

Managerial career
- 2025–2026: ASC 09 Dortmund
- 2026–: Westfalia Rhynern
Medal record
Borussia Dortmund
Winner	Bundesliga	2010–11
- * Club domestic league appearances and goals

Marco Stiepermann (born 9 February 1991) is a German professional football manager and former player. He is currently a coach at Regionalliga club Westfalia Rhynern.

== Career ==
=== Borussia Dortmund ===
Stiepermann began his career 1998 in the youth of Borussia Dortmund and was in the 2008–09 season promoted to the reserve team. He earned his first professional cap for Borussia Dortmund in the Bundesliga against VfL Wolfsburg on 13 December 2009 and scored in the return match on 1 May 2010 his first Bundesliga goal against VfL Wolfsburg.

=== Alemannia Aachen ===
On 24 May 2011, Stiepermann joined Alemannia Aachen on loan until the end of the 2011–12 season.

=== Energie Cottbus ===
On 29 May 2012, Stiepermann moved to Energie Cottbus, signed a contract until June 2015. The transfer fee was believed to be €200,000.

=== Greuther Fürth ===
After Cottbus were relegated from the 2. Bundesliga at the end of the 2013–14 season, Stiepermann used a release clause to leave the club on a free transfer. He signed a three-year contract with fellow 2. Bundesliga club SpVgg Greuther Fürth.

=== VfL Bochum ===
On 16 June 2016, Stiepermann joined VfL Bochum.

=== Norwich City ===
On 6 August 2017, Stiepermann joined Championship club Norwich City on a three-year deal for an undisclosed fee.

Stiepermann had a troubled first season in England, moved out to play left-back for much of the season before a hernia prematurely ended his first term with Norwich.

After rumors of a potential return to Germany before the 2018–19 season, Stiepermann played a crucial role in Norwich's surprise Championship winning season; contributing with 10 goals and 8 assists as he returned to his preferred attacking midfielder position.

In May 2019, he signed a new three-year contract but a disappointing season in the Premier League followed as Norwich were instantly relegated back to the Championship.

During Norwich's title-winning 2020–21 EFL Championship season, Stiepermann played a very limited part. This was due to illness as well as the permanent signing of Kieran Dowell from Everton, who was preferred in the attacking midfield role. On 1 July 2021, it was announced that Stiepermann's contract with the club had been cancelled by mutual consent.

=== SC Paderborn ===
On 17 August 2021, Stiepermann returned to Germany, signing a one-year deal with SC Paderborn.

=== Wuppertaler SV ===
In summer 2022, Stiepermann joined Regionalliga West club Wuppertaler SV.

=== ASC 09 Dortmund ===
In February 2023 it was announced he would join Oberliga Westfalen club ASC 09 Dortmund as player-coach in the summer. Stiepermann retired as a player at the end of the 2024‍–‍25 season. His final appearance came as a substitute in a 3‍–‍2 victory against Ahlen on 31 May 2025. ASC 09 Dortmund finished the season in third position.

== Career statistics ==
As of match played 4 July 2024

Appearances and goals by club, season and competition
Club	Season	League			National cup		League cup		Total	
Club	Season	Division	Apps	Goals	Apps	Goals	Apps	Goals	Apps	Goals
Borussia Dortmund II	2008–09	Regionalliga West	1	0	—		—		1	0
Borussia Dortmund II	2009–10	3. Liga	7	0	—		—		7	0
Borussia Dortmund II	2010–11	Regionalliga West	25	5	—		—		25	5
Borussia Dortmund II	Total		33	5	—		—		33	5
Borussia Dortmund	2009–10	Bundesliga	3	1	0	0	—		3	1
Borussia Dortmund	2010–11	Bundesliga	4	0	0	0	—		4	0
Borussia Dortmund	Total		7	1	0	0	—		7	1
Alemannia Aachen II	2011–12	NRW-Liga	8	0	—		—		8	0
Alemannia Aachen	2011–12	2. Bundesliga	21	2	1	0	—		22	2
Energie Cottbus II	2012–13	Regionalliga Nordost	2	1	—		—		2	1
Energie Cottbus	2012–13	2. Bundesliga	27	2	1	0	—		28	2
Energie Cottbus	2013–14	2. Bundesliga	29	5	2	0	—		31	5
Energie Cottbus	Total		56	7	3	0	—		59	7
Greuther Fürth II	2014–15	Regionalliga Bayern	1	1	—		—		1	1
Greuther Fürth	2014–15	2. Bundesliga	31	4	2	0	—		33	4
Greuther Fürth	2015–16	2. Bundesliga	30	5	0	0	—		30	5
Greuther Fürth	Total		61	9	2	0	—		63	9
VfL Bochum	2016–17	2. Bundesliga	31	1	1	1	—		32	2
Norwich City	2017–18	Championship	23	1	1	0	3	0	27	1
Norwich City	2018–19	Championship	43	9	0	0	3	1	46	10
Norwich City	2019–20	Premier League	24	0	3	0	0	0	27	0
Norwich City	2020–21	Championship	18	1	0	0	1	0	19	1
Norwich City	Total		108	11	4	0	7	1	119	12
Norwich City U23	2020–21	Professional Development League	3	3	–		–		33	3
SC Paderborn	2021–22	2. Bundesliga	16	3	0	0	—		16	3
Wuppertaler SV	2022–23	Regionalliga West	28	7	0	0	—		28	7
ASC 09 Dortmund	2023–24	Oberliga Westfalen	26	6	0	0	—		26	6
Career total			401	57	11	1	7	1	419	59

== Honours ==
Borussia Dortmund

- Bundesliga: 2010–11

Norwich City

- EFL Championship: 2018–19, 2020–21
