= Westphalian Cup =

Westphalia Cup
- Founded: 1981
- Region: Westphalia; North Rhine-Westphalia; Germany
- Qualifier for: German Cup
- Current champions: SC Verl (2025–26)
- Most championships: Arminia Bielefeld (7 titles)

The Westphalia Cup is a German football club Cup competition open to teams from the Westphalia region of the North Rhine-Westphalia state. The competition in its existing format is relatively new compared to many other regional cups in Germany. It is one of the 21 regional cup competitions in Germany. The competition also acts as a qualifier to the following seasons' DFB-Pokal.

== Winners ==
=== Pre-1981 ===
There are very few records of the competition prior to 1981, however, the following winners are known:

- 1908: Arminia Bielefeld
- 1932: Arminia Bielefeld
- 1943: FC Schalke 04
- 1944: FC Schalke 04
- 1947: Borussia Dortmund

=== Post-1981 ===
The winners since 1981:

Year	Winner	Runner-up	Score
1982	Rot-Weiß Lüdenscheid	1. FC Paderborn	2–0
1983	Rot-Weiß Lüdenscheid	SC Herford	2–0 AET
1984	SC Herford	1. FC Paderborn	3–1
1985	TuS Paderborn-Neuhaus	1. FC Achternberg	4–2
1986	DSC Wanne-Eickel	FC Gütersloh	2–1
1987	SpVgg Erkenschwick	Preußen Münster	2–1
1988	TBV Lemgo	SV Ottfingen	4–1
1989	VfR Sölde	FC Gütersloh	2–1
1990	ASC Schöppingen	DSC Wanne-Eickel	5–0
1991	Arminia Bielefeld	Borussia Dortmund Amateure	6–1
1992	SC Verl	SpVgg Beckum	2–1
1993	SpVgg Erkenschwick	Rot-Weiß Lüdenscheid	3–1
1994	TuS Paderborn-Neuhaus	FC Schalke 04 Amateure	4–2
1995	SpVgg Beckum	SpVgg Erkenschwick	412
1996	TuS Paderborn-Neuhaus	SpVgg Erkenschwick	4–1
1997	Preußen Münster	TSG Dülmen	4–1
1998	LR Ahlen	Preußen Münster	2–1
1999	SC Verl	SC Paderborn 07	2–1
2000	SC Paderborn 07	SG Wattenscheid 09	2–0
2001	SC Paderborn 07	FC Schalke 04 Amateure	2–11
2002	SC Paderborn 07	Sportfreunde Siegen	3–1
2003	FC Eintracht Rheine	Sportfreunde Siegen	2–1
2004	SC Paderborn 07	SG Wattenscheid 09	3–2
2005	Sportfreunde Siegen	VfL Bochum Amateure	0–0 AET (5–3 P)
2006	Westfalia Herne	Delbrücker SC	6–4
2007	SC Verl	Rot Weiss Ahlen	4–2
2008	Preußen Münster	VfB Fichte Bielefeld	3–0 AET
2009	Preußen Münster	Sportfreunde Lotte	3–1 AET
2010	Preußen Münster	SC Verl	4–1
2011	SC Wiedenbrück 2000	Rot Weiss Ahlen	3–1
2012	Arminia Bielefeld	Preußen Münster	2–0
2013	Arminia Bielefeld	SC Wiedenbrück 2000	3–1
2014	Preußen Münster	Sportfreunde Siegen	3–0
2015	Sportfreunde Lotte	SC Verl	0–0 AET (4–3 P)
2016	SG Wattenscheid 09	Rot Weiss Ahlen	3–0
2017	SC Paderborn 07	Sportfreunde Lotte	3–1
2018	SC Paderborn 07	TuS Erndtebrück	4–2
2019	SV Rödinghausen	SC Wiedenbrück	2–1
2020	RSV Meinerzhagen	SV Schermbeck	2–0
2021	Preußen Münster	Sportfreunde Lotte	1–0
2022	SV Rödinghausen	Preußen Münster	1–1 AET (3–2 P)
2023	FC Gütersloh	SpVgg Erkenschwick	0–0 (4–3 P)
2024	Arminia Bielefeld	SC Verl	3–1
2025	Arminia Bielefeld	Sportfreunde Lotte	2–0
2026	SC Verl	Sportfreunde Lotte	3–0
