= Abdou Ouro-Akpo =

Togolese footballer

Personal information
- Full name: Abdou Nassirou Ouro-Akpo
- Date of birth: 5 June 1982 (age 44)
- Place of birth: Bafilo, Togo
- Height: 1.77 m (5 ft 9 1/2 in)
- Position: Striker

Senior career*
Years	Team	Apps	(Gls)
2000–2002	Maranatha		
2002–2006	Rot-Weiß Oberhausen	14	(3)
2006–2007	Germania Gladbeck		
2007–2009	Schwarz-Weiß Essen	67	(22)
2009–2010	SC Westfalia Herne	32	(14)
2010–2011	SC Fortuna Köln	11	(2)
2011–2013	SV Schermbeck	52	(22)
2013–2014	TSV Marl-Hüls	6	(1)
2014–2015	DSC Wanne-Eickel	12	(5)
2015–2016	Schwarz-Weiß Essen	20	(3)
2016–2017	BW Oberhausen-Lirich		
Total		214	(72)

International career
2003–2011	Togo	5	(0)
- * Club domestic league appearances and goals

Abdou Nassirou Ouro-Akpo (born 5 June 1982) is a Togolese former international footballer who played as a striker.

== Career ==
Ouro-Akpo has played club football in Togo and Germany for Maranatha, Rot-Weiß Oberhausen, Germania Gladbeck, Schwarz-Weiß Essen, SC Westfalia Herne, SC Fortuna Köln, SV Schermbeck, TSV Marl-Hüls, DSC Wanne-Eickel and BW Oberhausen-Lirich.

He earned five international caps for Togo in 2003.
