= Bernard Dietz =

German footballer and manager

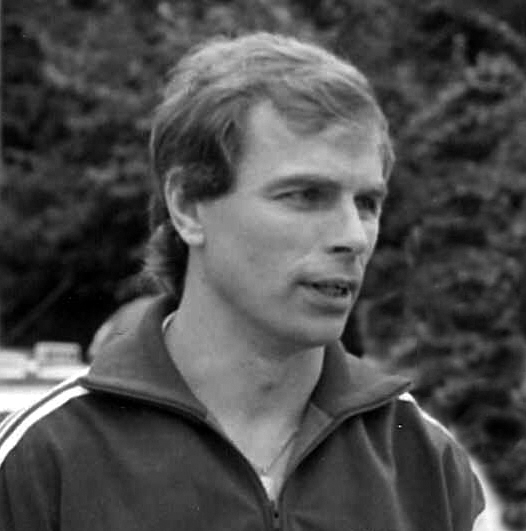
- Dietz in 1985

Personal information
- Date of birth: 22 March 1948 (age 78)
- Place of birth: Hamm, Allied-occupied Germany
- Height: 1.78 m (5 ft 10 in)
- Positions: Left back; sweeper

Youth career
- 1958–: SV Bockum-Hövel

Senior career*
Years	Team	Apps	(Gls)
–1970	SV Bockum-Hövel		
1970–1982	MSV Duisburg	396	(70)
1982–1987	Schalke 04	135	(8)

International career
1974–1981	West Germany	53	(0)

Managerial career
- 1987–1992: ASC Schöppingen
- 1992–1994: SC Verl
- 1994–2001: VfL Bochum II
- 1999: → VfL Bochum (caretaker)
- 2001: → VfL Bochum
- 2002–2006: MSV Duisburg II
- 2002: → MSV Duisburg (caretaker)
- 2006: Rot Weiss Ahlen
Medal record
Representing West Germany
UEFA European Championship
Winner	1980 Italy
Runner-up	1976 Yugoslavia
- * Club domestic league appearances and goals

Bernard Dietz (born 22 March 1948) is a German former football player and manager. A former defender, he captained the West Germany national team to victory in the UEFA Euro 1980.

== Club career ==
A defender in his professional career, Bernard Dietz played in 495 Bundesliga matches for MSV Duisburg and FC Schalke 04, scoring 70 goals in his Duisburg years and seven in his days with Schalke 04 in the top tier of German football. Leaving Duisburg for Schalke in 1982 caused him to feature 34 times (one goal) for the Gelsenkirchen outfit in the 2. Bundesliga of 1983–84 after the club had been relegated from Bundesliga in Dietz' first season with them. With the German Cup final participation in 1975 his biggest success in his club career, the defender made several other stir. He is still both the top-scoring defender in the history of the Bundesliga across all clubs and second in the list of goal-scorers for MSV Duisburg in the top flight. Although he took part in over 500 games he just received 11 bookings (and no red cards). On 5 November 1977, the down-to-earth defender scored four goals in MSV Duisburg's 6–3 against Bayern Munich and was, in 1978–79, the captain of MSV Duisburg when they reached the round of the last four in the UEFA Cup.

To honour the efforts of Dietz for MSV Duisburg in his career, the fans of the club decided to dub the club's mascot, a zebra, Ennatz. Ennatz is the nickname of Dietz.

== International career ==
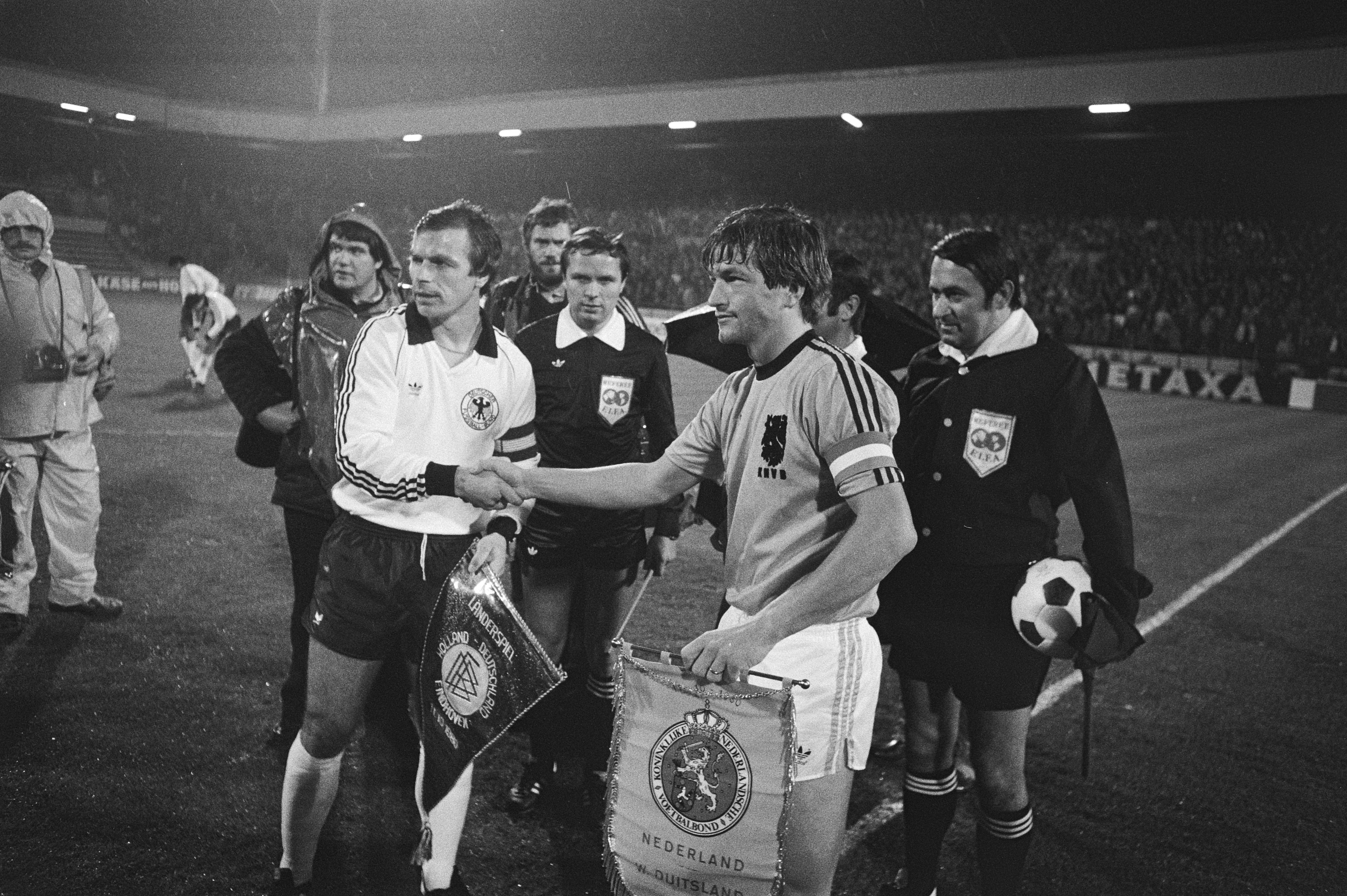
Dietz (left) before the game against the Netherlands in 1980

On 22 December 1974, Dietz won his debut for West Germany in a Euro 1976 qualifier against Malta in Malta. After his final game for his nation, on 19 May 1981, against Brazil in Stuttgart, he had been capped 53 times by Helmut Schön and Jupp Derwall. Participating also in the Euro 1976 and at the 1978 FIFA World Cup, Dietz was able to lift the Euro 1980 trophy as the captain of the triumphant West German team.

== Coaching career ==
Dietz stayed in the game after his retirement, working as a coach on professional and amateur level. He was head coach of ASC Schöppingen from 1 July 1987 He left the club on 30 June 1992. Then he was manager of SC Verl from 1 July 1992 to 1 Februar 1994. He then took over VfL Bochum II from 1 July 1994 to 30 June 2001. He was interim head coach of VfL Bochum from 26 October 1999 to 23 December 1999. No intention to do the job permanently, Bochum won five league matches along with a draw and a loss under Dietz' guidance. He also had a win and a loss in the German Cup. Dietz returned to coaching Bochum's youth when they found Ernst Middendorp's successor in Ralf Zumdick, but was straight back in charge of Bochum's first-team affairs after Zumdick failed to avoid the drop straight back to 2. Bundesliga in 2001. His appointment started for the 2001–02 season. His second spell on top of Bochum's coaching worked out no success and made him resign on 3 December 2001. He had a record of seven wins, six draws, and three losses in 16 matches. Switching to his old club MSV Duisburg to take charge of Duisburg's reserves in 2002, Dietz returned to 2. Bundesliga coaching later on as interim head coach. However, just as caretaker to bridge the time until Duisburg replaced Pierre Littbarski with Norbert Meier. He finished his interim reign with five wins and two losses from seven matches. On 15 May 2006, Dietz decided not to extend his deal as reserve-team coach with Duisburg and to take charge of LR Ahlen in the third division. His first match in–charge was a 3–0 win against Fortuna Düsseldorf. He resigned from his position on 29 October 2006. His final match was a 3–0 loss to Kickers Emden.

== Coaching record ==
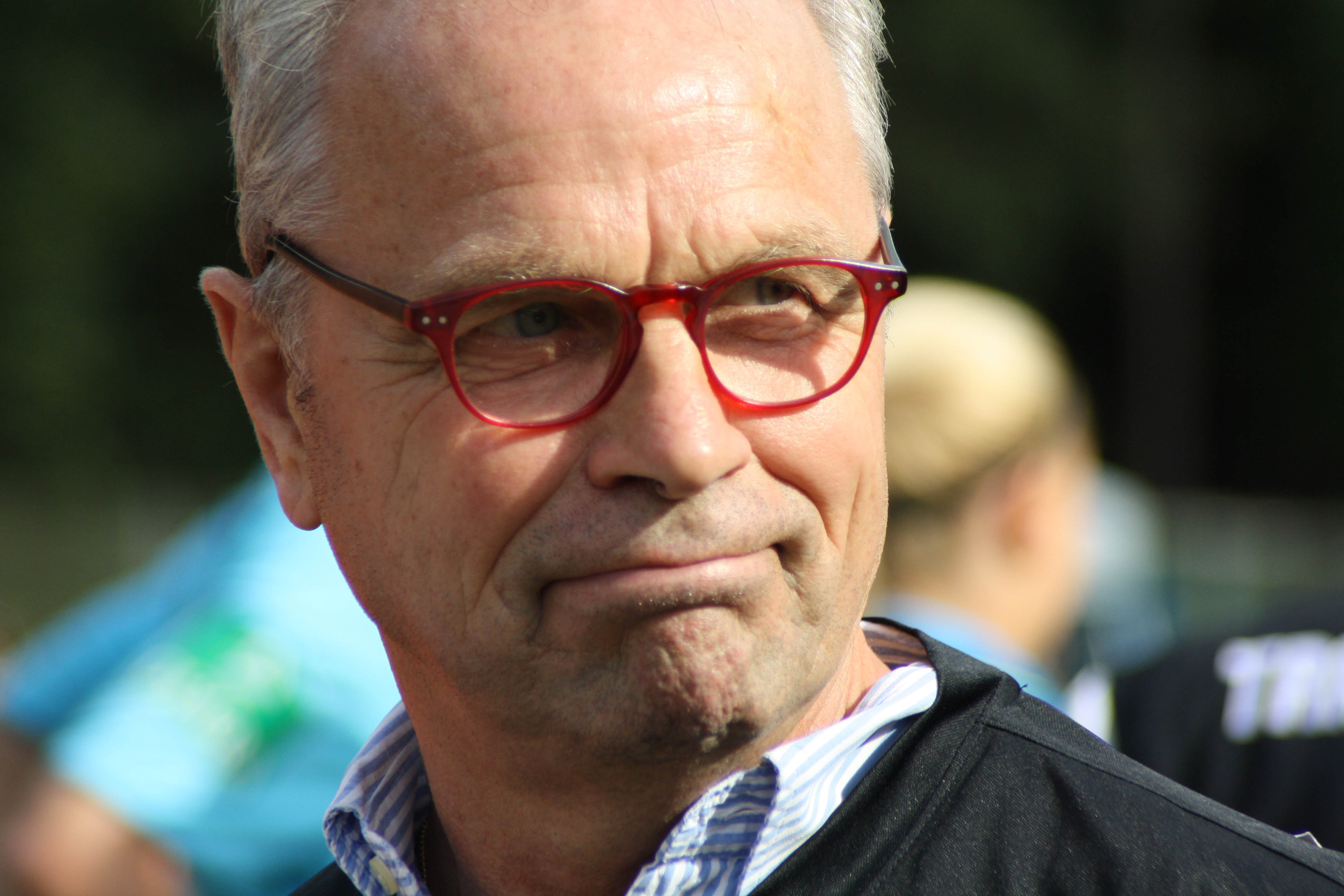
Dietz in 2011

Team	From	To	Record					
Team	From	To	M	W	D	L	Win %	Ref.
ASC Schöppingen	1 July 1987	30 June 1992	151	63	51	37	41.72	
SC Verl	1 July 1992	1 Februar 1994	52	26	16	10	50.00	
VfL Bochum	26 October 1999	23 December 1999	9	6	1	2	66.67	
VfL Bochum	1 July 2001	3 December 2001	16	7	6	3	43.75	
MSV Duisburg	4 November 2002	20 November 2002	7	5	0	2	71.43	
LR Ahlen	1 July 2006	29 October 2006	14	4	2	8	28.57	
Total			111	54	29	28	48.65	—

== Honours ==
MSV Duisburg

- DFB-Pokal runner-up: 1974–75

West Germany

- UEFA European Championship: 1980

Individual

- kicker Bundesliga Team of the Season: 1973–74, 1974–75, 1975–76, 1977–78, 1978–79, 1979–80, 1984–85
- Onze Mondial: 1977
