= SpVgg Emsdetten 05 =

German football club

- Full name: Spielvereinigung Emsdetten 05 e.V.
- Founded: 1905
- Ground: Salvus-Stadion am Grevener Damm
- Capacity: 5,000
- Chairwoman: Corinna Holtz
- Manager: Bodo Gadomski
- League: Bezirksliga Westfalen 12 (VIII)
- 2018–19: 9th
Home colours	Away colours

SpVgg Emsdetten 05 is a German association football club from the city of Emsdetten, North Rhine-Westphalia.

== History ==
The association was created in 1905 as the gymnastics clubs Turnverein Jahn Emsdetten and Turnverein Eichenlaub which merged in 1908 to become Turnverein Deutsche Einigkeit. Turnverein Emsdetten 09 was formed in 1909 and it already had a football department. Deutsche Einigkeit and Emsdetten 09 eventually merged in 1922, becoming TuS Deutsche Einigkeit. The footballers left to form a separate club called Spielverein Emsdetten in 1924 and adopted the name Spielvereinigung Emsdetten in 1935.

The club has played amateur football throughout its history and came close to advancing into the third division Landesliga Westfalen, then the highest amateur class in German football, when they met TSV Hüls in a 1949 playoff before 10,00 spectators. Emsdetten did later find its way into the Landesliga, playing two seasons there from 1954 to 1956.

Re-structuring of German football leagues helped push the club down to lower levels of competition. In 1970 they rose to play in the Verbandsliga Westfalen (IV) and would move up to become a third division side after league re-organization in 1978, playing in the Oberliga Westfalen (III). A next-to-last place finish in 1980 would drive the club back down to the Verbandsliga, but success in regional cup play earned Emsdetten a place in the 1980–81 German Cup competition where they went out 0:6 in the first round to 1. FC Köln.

Several years spent in fifth division competition ended in 1991 when the club was relegated to the Landesliga Westfalen (VI). SpVgg began to climb its way back up in 2000, returning to the then fifth tier Verbandsliga before a second-place result there in 2002 qualified the team to play in the Oberliga Westfalen (IV) where they competed as a lower-to-mid table side. In 2007 they were dropped back to the Verbandsliga, which became a sixth tier competition and was renamed Westfalenliga the next year with the introduction of 3. Liga as the new third tier. Two successive relegations by the early 2010s returned them to the Landesliga (VII) and dropped them further to the Bezirksliga (VIII) before a district championship in the latter league in 2013 put them back in the Landesliga where they played until 2017, when they went back to the Bezirksliga.

SpVgg Emsdetten delivers its home matches in the Salvus-Stadion am Grevener Damm which has a capacity of 5,000 (~200 seats). The club currently has a membership of 1,000.
