= TuS Dornberg =

German football club

- Full name: Turn- und Sportverein Dornberg e.V.
- Founded: 1902
- Manager: David Odonkor
- League: Bezirksliga Westfalen (VIII)
- 2015–16: Landesliga Westfalen 4 (VII), 16th (withdrawn)
Home colours	Away colours

TuS Dornberg is a German association football club from the town of Bielefeld, North Rhine-Westphalia. Founded in 1902, the team currently plays in the Westfalenliga (VI). The footballers enjoyed their greatest successes through the latter half of the 1970s. The club also has departments for volleyball, gymnastics and badminton.

== History ==
TuS advanced to Bezirksliga play in 1975 and the following season moved up to Landesliga Westfalen (IV) play. They earned mid-table results there, with their best finish coming as a ninth-place result in 1979–80. However, two successive demotions returned the club to A-Klasse competition by 1982. They returned to the Bezirksliga for a single season appearance in 1994–95 before financial problems drove the club down to Kreisliga C-Klasse play, the lowest level in the state.

The club's fortunes began to turn in 1999 with the support of a group of sponsors led by the former Satellite 1 newscaster Hans-Hermann Gockel. TuS won five consecutive promotions and by 2004 had risen to the Verbandsliga Westfalen (V). A large part of the credit for the team's success was due to the play of striker Tony Agyemang, who scored 150 goals over those five seasons. The jump to fifth division play, however, proved too much for the club which immediately slipped back into Landesliga (VI) play. They were unable to engineer a return to the Verbandsliga the following season, finishing in second place, five points behind titlists SC Wiedenbrück 2000. After a mid-table result in 2007–08, Dornberg won promotion to what had become the Westfalenliga (VI), the second highest level of play in the state. They won the title there in 2011 and advanced to the NRW-Liga (V). That league was replaced by Oberliga Westfalen the next year where Dornberg was relegated to the Westfalenliga (VI) in 2014 and to the Landesliga the season after. The club withdrew from the Landesliga during the 2015–16 season altogether to enter the Bezirksliga for the following season.
