= NRW-Liga =

Highest football league in North Rhine-Westphalia (2008–2012)

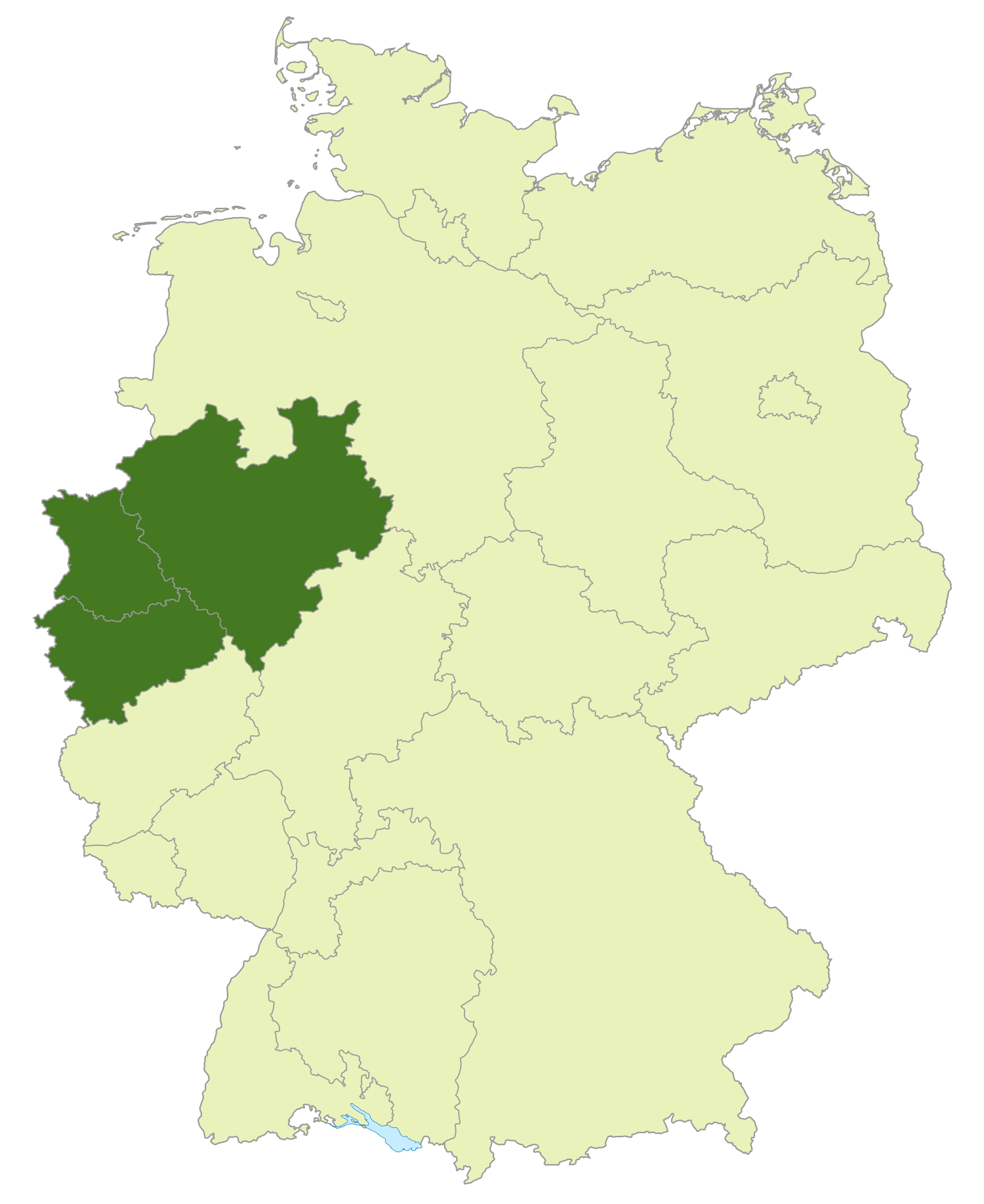
- Founded: 2008
- Folded: 2012
- Country: Germany
- State: North Rhine-Westphalia
- Number of clubs: 18
- Level on pyramid: Level 5
- Promotion to: Regionalliga West
- Relegation to: Niederrheinliga; Mittelrheinliga; Westfalenliga
- Last champions: FC Viktoria Köln (2011–12)

The Nordrhein-Westfalen-Liga (North Rhine-Westphalia League; NRW-Liga) was the highest football league in the state of North Rhine-Westphalia (NRW) from 2008 to 2012. It was one of the eleven Oberliga groups in German football, the fifth tier of the German football league system.

With the reorganisation of the German league system in 2012, the NRW-Liga was disbanded once more as the Regionalliga West above it would then only contain clubs from North Rhine-Westphalia. The league was replaced by the three regional leagues, the Mittelrheinliga, Niederrheinliga and Oberliga Westfalen at this level.

== Overview ==
The NRW-Liga was established in 2008 as a feeder league to the also new Regionalliga West. The new Oberliga is actually a merger of the Oberliga Nordrhein and the Oberliga Westfalen, giving the state of North Rhine-Westphalia its first statewide league since the "old" Regionalliga West was disbanded in 1974. Due to the introduction of the 3. Liga in the same year, unlike the two old Oberliga groups that were set at tier four of the league system, the new league was at the fifth tier.

The league retained the four Verbandsliga groups of the two predecessor Oberliga groups as its feeder leagues, with the champion of each of those gaining direct promotion to the NRW-Liga. In turn, the top two teams of the NRW-Liga gained promotion to the Regionalliga West.

The league was made up from a set quota of teams from each of the two predecessor Oberliga groups and the four Verbandsliga groups. While the top four clubs from North Rhine and Westphalia were promoted to the Regionalliga, teams placed fifth to eleventh were headed go to the new NRW-Liga. The clubs placed twelve to eighteen were relegated to their Verbandsliga group. From the four Verbandsliga groups, each of the champions gained admittance, unless it was a reserve team of a club already qualified for the Oberliga. In this case, the next eligible club was admitted.

There was some dispute about the name of the league with the suggestion having been made to rather call it Oberliga West, a league of that name having already existed from 1947 to 1963, the "old" Oberliga West. The previous league of that name was a tier one league but covered the same region. It has however been decided to officially call it NRW-Liga, short for Nordrhein-Westfalen-Liga.

Additionally, the Verbandsliga groups were renamed Niederrheinliga, Mittelrheinliga and 2 of Westfalenliga.

With the end of the 2011–12 season, after four seasons of existence, the NRW-Liga was disbanded again. The place of the league as the fifth tier in North Rhine-Westphalia was then taken up by three regional leagues, the Mittelrheinliga and Niederrheinliga for the North Rhine region and the reformed Oberliga Westfalen for Westphalia. The top three clubs from the NRW-Liga gained direct entry to the Regionalliga while the teams placed fourth to seventh had to play-off with the four champions from the leagues below to determine four additional promoted teams.

== Teams 2011–12 ==
Remaining in the NRW-Liga:

- Alemannia Aachen II
- SV Bergisch Gladbach 09
- MSV Duisburg II
- Schwarz-Weiß Essen
- Westfalia Herne
- VfB Homberg
- VfB Hüls
- Westfalia Rhynern
- SV Schermbeck
- Sportfreunde Siegen
- VfB Speldorf
- SSVg. Velbert

From the 3. Liga:

- Rot Weiss Ahlen

From the Regionalliga West:

- Arminia Bielefeld II

From the Verbandsliga Niederrhein:

- KFC Uerdingen 05

From the Verbandsliga Mittelrhein:

- Viktoria Köln

From the Verbandsliga Westfalen 1:

- TuS Dornberg

From the Verbandsliga Westfalen 2:

- TuS Erndtebrück

== Champions and runners-up of the NRW-Liga ==
Season	Champions	Runners-up
2008–09	Bonner SC	Fortuna Düsseldorf II
2009–10	SC Wiedenbrück 2000	Arminia Bielefeld II
2010–11	Rot-Weiss Essen	Germania Windeck ^{1}
2011–12	FC Viktoria Köln	Sportfreunde Siegen

- ^{1} The TSV Germania Windeck declined its right to promotion and withdrew to the Mittelrheinliga, with Fortuna Köln promoted instead.

== Placings in the league ==
The final placings in the league:

Club	09	10	11	12
Fortuna Düsseldorf II	2	R	R	R
SC Wiedenbrück		1	R	R
Rot-Weiß Essen	R	R	1	R
Fortuna Köln	9	15	3	R
Viktoria Köln				1
Sportfreunde Siegen	11	13	7	2
MSV Duisburg II	7	11	8	3
SSVg Velbert	13	12	6	4
Arminia Bielefeld II	5	2	R	5
Alemannia Aachen II	3	6	4	6
VfB Hüls	14	16	15	7
KFC Uerdingen 05				8
SV Bergisch Gladbach 09		9	12	9
Schwarz-Weiß Essen	4	4	5	10
Westfalia Rhynern			16	11
TuS Dornberg				12
SV Schermbeck	15	14	10	13
VfB Speldorf		8	9	14
TuS Erndtebrück				15
VfB Homberg			11	16
Rot-Weiss Ahlen	2B	2B	3L	17
Westfalia Herne	6	7	13	18
Germania Windeck ^{1}	10	3	2	
FC Wegberg-Beeck ^{3}			14	
SpVgg Erkenschwick			17	
1. FC Kleve _{4}	R	10	18	
Bonner SC ^{5}	1	R		
Rot-Weiß Essen II ^{2}	8	5		
Hammer SpVg	16	17		
SG Wattenscheid 09	12	18		
TSG Sprockhövel		19		
FC Gütersloh	17			
SF Oestrich-Iserlohn	18			
Delbrücker SC	19			

- ^{1} At the end of the 2012–13 season Germania Dattenfeld withdrew from the league.
- ^{2} At the end of the 2009–10 season Rot-Weiß Essen II was relegated from the league because the first team had been relegated to the NRW-Liga.
- ^{3} FC Wegberg-Beeck did not apply for a licence for the 2011–12 season and was relegated.
- _{4} The 1. FC Kleve withdrew from the league during the 2010–11 season.
- ^{5} At the end of the 2009–10 season Bonner SC had to declare insolvency and withdrew to the tier seven Landesliga.

.

=== Key ===
Symbol	Key
B	Bundesliga (1963–present)
2B	2. Bundesliga (1974–present)
3L	3. Liga (2008–present)
R	Regionalliga West (2008–present)
1	League champions
Place	League
Blank	Played at a league level below this league
