= SV Rotthausen =

German football club

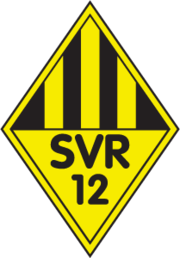
- Full name: Sportverein Rotthausen 12 e.V.
- Founded: 1912; 114 years ago
- Dissolved: 2000; 26 years ago
- Ground: Bezirkssportanlage Auf der Reihe
Home colours	Away colours

SV Rotthausen was a German association football club from the district of Rotthausen in Gelsenkirchen, North Rhine-Westphalia. The team was founded in 1912 and played briefly in the Gauliga Westfalen (I), one of 16 top-flight regional circuits in Germany prior to World War II. In the 1990s, SV played four seasons in the Oberliga Westfalen (IV). After bankruptcy in 2000, successor side SSV Rotthausen joined 1.FC Achternberg to form SSV/FCA Rotthausen 2000 which currently competes in the eighth-tier Bezirksliga Westfalen.

== History ==
After capturing the title in the Bezirksklasse Gelsenkirchen in 1936, Sportverein Rotthausen was promoted to Gauliga play alongside Borussia Dortmund, but was relegated after just two campaigns. The team then became part of Spiel- und Sport Delog Rotthausen which was the company side of glassworks Delog Rotthausen, the town's largest employer at the time, to play as Deutschen SC Rotthausen. Following the war, the club reemerged as SV and played a single season in the third tier Landesliga Westfalen in 1952–53, before disappearing into lower level local competition. They returned to Landesliga play in 1968 where they remained until 1972.

The team enjoyed some success in the 1990s with the financial support of timber merchant Otto Stein, winning their way into the Verbandsliga Westfalen (IV) in 1993 and then the Oberliga Westfalen (IV) in 1995. They were relegated at the end of the 1997–98 season, but immediately bounced back on the strength of a second place Verbandsliga finish. However the club was overcome by debt and declared bankruptcy in April 2000. Successor Spiel- und Sportverein Rotthausen was short-lived and merged with 1. FC Achternberg in March 2001.

Predecessor side 1. FC Achternberg took part in the opening round of the 1985–86 DFB-Pokal (German Cup) where they were beaten 0:2 by second division VfL Osnabrück. They qualified for DFB-Pokal play as finalists in the 1985 Westfalen-Pokal (Westfalia Cup) where they lost 2:4 to TuS Paderborn-Neuhaus (now SC Paderborn 07).
