= Bafilo =

- Location in Togo
- Coordinates: 9°21′N 1°16′E
- Country: Togo
- Region: Kara Region

Population (2006)
  - Total: 23,085

Bafilo is a city in Togo south of Kara and north of Sokode in Tchaoudjo Region.

It is known for its large mosque, wagasi cheese, its weaving industry and the nearby Bafilo Falls.

== History ==
=== World War I ===
During World War I, a skirmish took place in Bafilo between French and German troops in on 13 August 1914. French forces first crossed the border between French Dahomey and German Togoland on 8 or 9 of August 1914. French units in north-eastern Togoland came into contact with German ones on 13 August in the districts of Sansane-Mangu and Sokode-Balfilo. After some light fighting, the French company retreated after facing resistance stronger than they had expected.

Although this was technically a victory for German forces, it did little to stall the Allied advance and by the end of August the colony was surrendered to the Allies.

== Notable people ==
- Abdou Ouro-Akpo (born 1982), former international footballer
