= VfB Altena =

German football club

- Full name: Verein für Bewegungsspiele Altena 1912 e.V.
- Founded: 1912
- Ground: Sportzentrum Pragpaul
- League: Kreisliga A Lüdenscheid (IX)
- 2015–16: 2nd
| Home colours | Away colours |

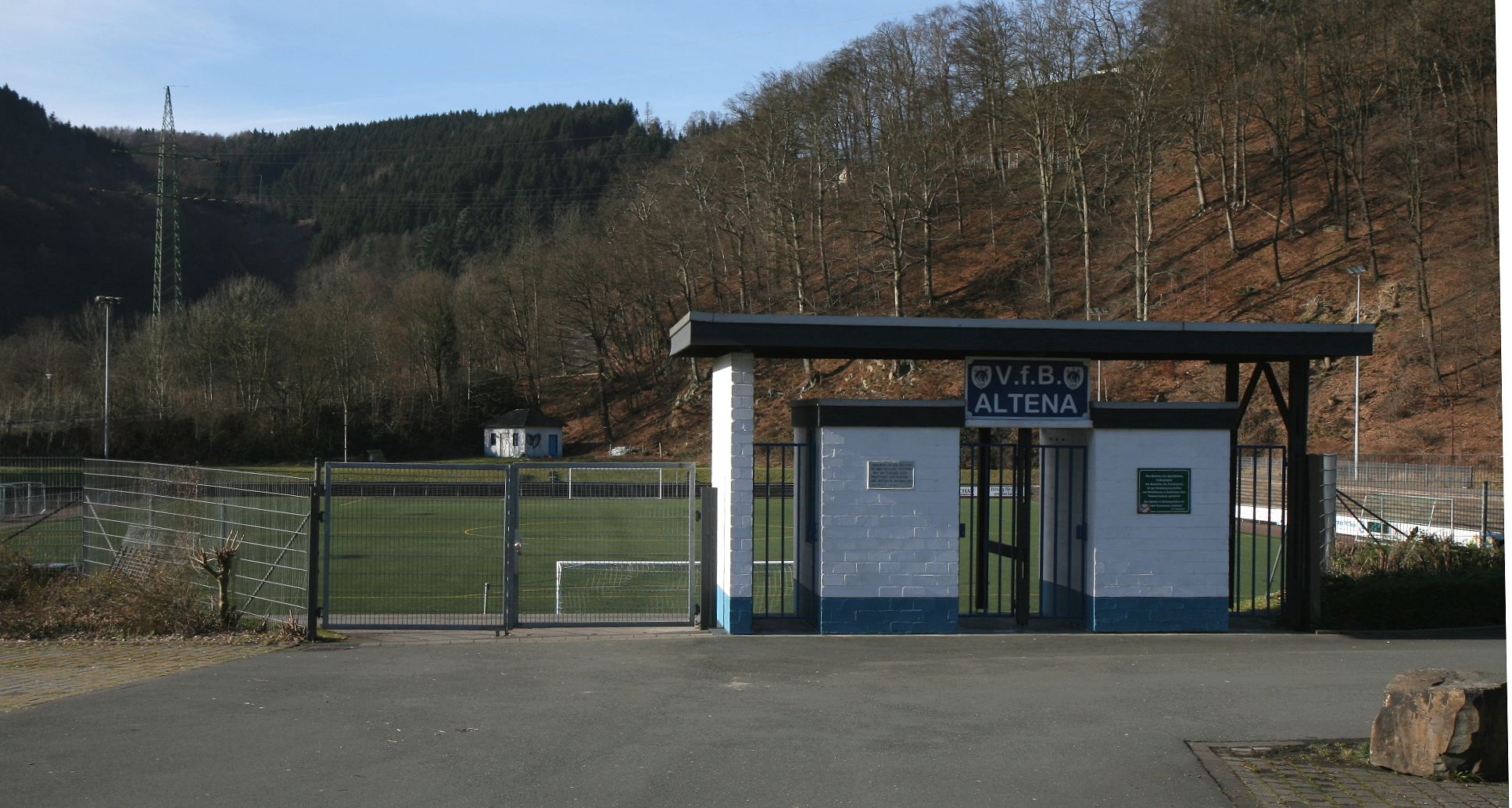
Sportzentrum Pragpaul

VfB Altena is a German football club from the city of Altena, North Rhine-Westphalia. The club has spent most of its existence in lower level local play with the exception of seven seasons (1974–81) spent in third-tier competition. In addition to its football side the club has departments for chess, handball, and table tennis.

== History ==
The team was established 23 March 1912 as Verein für Bewegungsspiele Altena and was joined sometime around 1920 by the football department of Turnverein Deutsche Eiche Altena. After emerging as Landesliga Westfalen (IV) champions in 1974 they were promoted to the Amateurliga Westfalen (III), Gruppe 2. The league was reorganized into a single division in 1978 becoming the Amateuroberliga Westfalen (IV). Altena earned only lower table finishes with their best result being 9th in 1978. They were relegated after a 14th-place finish in 1981 and play today in the Kreisliga A Lüdenscheid (VIII).

== Honours ==
- Landesliga Westfalen (IV)
  - Champions: 1974
