= Ahlener SG =

German football club

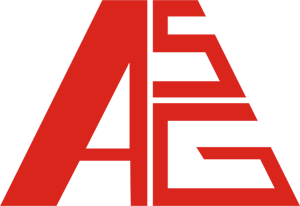
- Full name: Ahlener Sportgemeinde
- Founded: 24 May 1993
- Ground: Sportpark Nord
- League: Kreisliga A Beckum (IX)
- 2015–16: 3rd
Home colours	Away colours

Ahlener SG is a German football club from the city of Ahlen, North Rhine-Westphalia. The origins of the club go back to the merger of predecessor sides Spiel- und Sport 1905 Ahlen and Ballspiel Verein Westfalia 1906 Ahlen which played as SSV Westfalia 1905/06 Ahlen.

== History ==
On 8 July 1970 the side was joined with Sportfreunde Wacker 1920 Ahlen to become Ahlener Sportverein and in 1972 advanced to the third tier Amateurliga Westfalen Gruppe 1 where they would spend the next half dozen seasons as an upper table side. SV's best result was a second-place finish in 1976 before they crashed out of what had become the Amateuroberliga Westfalen after a 17th-place result in 1978–79.

SV merged with Handball Sportgemeinde 73 Ahlen on 25 May 1993 and competes today as Ahlener SG 93 which has departments for football, handball, water sports, volleyball, table tennis and fitness.

Today the club plays in the tier nine Kreisliga A Beckum.
