= ASC Schöppingen =

German football club

- Full name: Allgemeiner Sportclub 45 Schöppingen e.V.
- Founded: 1945
- Ground: Vechtestadion
- Capacity: 5,000
- Chairman: Lothar Zurholt
- Manager: Simon Artmann & Tobias Haverkock
- League: Kreisliga A Ahaus (IX)
- 2015–16: 10th

ASC Schöppingen is a German association football club from the town of Schöppingen, North Rhine-Westphalia. The club's greatest success has been winning a league championship in the tier three Oberliga Westfalen 1985–86 and taking part in the promotion round to the 2. Bundesliga.

The club also took part in the 1990–91 DFB-Pokal, the German Cup, where it was knocked-out in the first round.

== History ==
Formed in 1945, ASC played the first three decades of its existence as a lower tier amateur side. The club opened its current home ground, the Vechtestadion, in 1955 and, from 1956 to 1964, was a member of the DJK-Sportverband, a catholic faith-based sports organisation in Germany.

Schöppingen began to rise through the league system in the mid-1970s. It won promotion to the tier five Bezirksliga in 1974, to the Landesliga above it in 1975 and the tier three Verbandsliga Westfalen in 1977. The club missed out on qualifying for the new Oberliga Westfalen in 1977–78 when it finished only thirteenth. ASC played in the Verbandsliga until 1982 when a league championship earned it promotion to the Oberliga.

ASC played the next ten seasons in the Oberliga. The first two seasons the club finished seventh and thirteenth but, from 1984, its fortunes greatly improved. Schöppingen came third in 1984–85, followed by a league championship the season after. The club thereby qualified for the promotion round to the 2. Bundesliga where it faced VfB Oldenburg, SC Charlottenburg, FC St. Pauli and Rot-Weiß Essen. While the latter two won promotion ASC came last with one win, one draw and six defeats.

The club remained a strong side in the Oberliga after this, finishing third in three consecutive seasons from 1897 to 1990, followed by a runners-up finish in 1990–91, one point behind champions SC Verl. ASC, coached by former German international Bernard Dietz from 1987 to 1992, took part in the 1990–91 DFB-Pokal, the German Cup, where it lost 1–2 to Eintracht Frankfurt in the first round, as well as the 1991 German amateur football championship. The 1991–92 season was the last of the team in the Oberliga as it was withdrawn at the end of season despite finishing seventh. After the club's voluntary withdrawal from the Oberliga it organised a friendly against Bundesliga team MSV Duisburg to celebrate the end of an era.

The club has since been playing in local amateur football. It suffered relegation from the tier seven Bezirksliga in 2002 and has been playing predominantly in the tier below, the Kreisliga A, suffering occasional relegations to the Kreisliga B.

== Honours ==
The club's honours:

- Oberliga Westfalen
  - Champions: 1985–86
  - Runners-up: 1990–91
- Verbandsliga Westfalen
  - Champions: 1981–82
- Landesliga Westfalen
  - Champions: 1976–77
  - Runners-up: 1975–76
- Westphalia Cup
  - Winners: 1989–90

== Recent seasons ==
The recent season-by-season performance of the club:

Season	Division	Tier	Position
2003–04	Kreisliga B Coesfeld	IX	1st ↑
2004–05	Kreisliga A Coesfeld	VIII	10th
2005–06	Kreisliga A Coesfeld	VIII	9th
2006–07	Kreisliga A Coesfeld	VIII	11th
2007–08	Kreisliga A Coesfeld	VIII	11th
2008–09	Kreisliga A Coesfeld	IX	12th
2009–10	Kreisliga A Coesfeld	IX	7th
2010–11	Kreisliga A Coesfeld	IX	12th
2011–12	Kreisliga A Coesfeld	IX	9th
2012–13	Kreisliga A Coesfeld	IX	15th ↓
2013–14	Kreisliga B Coesfeld	X	2nd ↑
2014–15	Kreisliga A Coesfeld	IX	4th
2015–16	Kreisliga A Ahaus	IX	10th
2016–17	Kreisliga A Ahaus	IX	

- With the introduction of the Regionalligas in 1994 and the 3. Liga in 2008 as the new third tier, below the 2. Bundesliga, all leagues below dropped one tier.

↑ Promoted	↓ Relegated
