= SV Lippstadt 08 =

Association football club

SV Lippstadt
- Full name: Spielverein Lippstadt 08 e.V.
- Founded: March 1908; 118 years ago
- Ground: Stadion Am Bruchbaum
- Capacity: 4,250
- Chairman: Thilo Altmann
- Manager: Felix Bechtold
- League: Oberliga Westfalen (V)
- 2025–26: Oberliga Westfalen, 4th of 18
Home colours	Away colours

SV Lippstadt is a German association football club from the city of Lippstadt, North Rhine-Westphalia.

== History ==
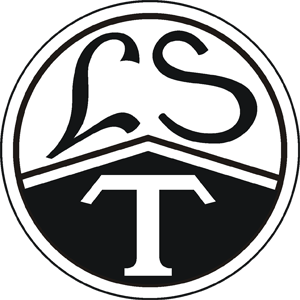
Logo of Teutonia Lippstadt ca. 1930

The two predecessors of the current-day club were both established in March 1908. Borussia Lippstadt was founded 24 March by students of the Gymnasium Ostendorf, while Lippstädter SV Teutonia was also founded sometime late in the month. Teutonia merged with SV Westfalia Lippstadt in 1921 and established a ground at Waldschlößchen that same year. This club played briefly in the top-flight regional league in 1931–33 until a general re-organization of German football under the Third Reich into sixteen first division Gauliga in 1933 saw then shuffled down to second-level competition.

Late in World War II Teutonia and SV Borussia Lippstadt played alongside Luftwaffe Sportverein Lipperbruchbaumas as part of the combined wartime side, or Kriegspielgemeinshaft, KSG Lippstadt. This team was inserted into the crumbling first division Gauliga Westfalen/Group 3 but never played a league match as war overtook the area. Following the conflict, occupying Allied authorities ordered the dissolution of organizations across the country, including sports and football clubs.

Both Borussia and Teutonia were re-established as separate sides after the war and in 1957 finished one-two competing against each other in the Landesliga Westfalen (III). Borussia was promoted directly into Verbandsliga Westfalen, while Teutonia also advanced after winning its way through a promotion playoff. Both sides were quickly sent down with the former playing only a single season at that level, while the latter played two seasons. For the most part over the next few decades the two clubs were up and down between the city and district circuits. They both enjoyed stints in the Verbandsliga beginning in the mid-70s, while Teutonia spent the first half of the 80s in the Oberliga.

Teutonia emerged from the Landesliga Westfalen (VI) and into the Verbandsliga Westfalen (V) in 1994. A merger in 1997 united the two clubs to create SV Lippstadt 08 and the new team earned promotion to the Oberliga Westfalen (IV) on the strength of a second-place result in the 1997–98 season. Their play has been uneven since their arrival into the country's highest amateur league. After earning top three finishes in their first two seasons at that level Lippstadt has since generally ended in the lower half of the table, including a close brush with relegation in 2005 but it remained in the league until the Oberliga Westfalen was disbanded in 2008.

Not strong enough to compete in the new NRW-Liga the club played in the Westfalenliga until 2012 when a league championship took it back up to the now reformed Oberliga Westfalen. A league championship in the Oberliga in 2013 earned it promotion to the tier four Regionalliga West but it was relegated from this level after only one season. It returned to the Regionalliga West in 2018 after again winning the Oberliga Westfalen.

== Honours ==
The club's honours:

- Oberliga Westfalen
  - Champions: 2012–13, 2017–18
- Westfalenliga – Group 1
  - Champions: 2011–12

== Current players ==
As of 1 February 2024

Note: Flags indicate national team as defined under FIFA eligibility rules; some limited exceptions apply. Players may hold more than one non-FIFA nationality.

No.	Pos.	Nation	Player
1	GK	GER	Christopher Balkenhoff
3	DF	GER	Maximilian Fischer
5	DF	GER	Luis Allmeroth
6	MF	GER	Lars Holtkamp
7	MF	GER	Lewin D'Hone
8	MF	NED	Joep Munsters
10	FW	GER	Viktor Maier
11	MF	NED	Niek Munsters
12	GK	GER	Benjamin Aust
14	MF	GER	Dominik Klann (on loan from 1. FC Bocholt)
15	MF	GER	Iker Luis Kohl
17	MF	GER	Tim Luca Zimpel
19	DF	GER	Elias Demirarslan
20	MF	GER	Louis Neugebauer

No.	Pos.	Nation	Player
21	MF	KOR	Seung-won Lee
22	FW	GER	Wladimir Wagner
23	DF	GER	Kiyan Sadeghi
24	MF	GER	Fatih Ufuk
25	DF	GER	Ibrahim Sori-Kaba
27	MF	GER	Yasin Altun
28	FW	GER	Gerrit Kaiser
29	FW	GER	Maximilian Franke
30	MF	GER	Serkan Temin
32	GK	GER	Steffen Westphal
33	MF	GER	Phil Josef Mehn
34	MF	GER	Salmin Rebronja
36	DF	TUR	Yusuf Şahin Örnek

== Famous players ==
- Karl-Heinz Rummenigge, came up through the youth system of Borussia Lippstadt before joining Bayern Munich and going on to play for the Germany national side
- Daniel Farke, played for SV Lippstadt for 3 stints during his career before managing the club, and later winning the English Football Leagues Championship on 3 occasions; twice with Norwich City F.C and once with Leeds united F.C.
