= VfB Hüls =

German football club

- Full name: Verein für Bewegungsspiele 48/64 Hüls e.V.
- Founded: 22 July 1948
- Ground: Stadion am Badeweiher
- Capacity: 6,000
- Chairman: Dr. Hartmut Müller
- Manager: Markus Kaya
- League: Bezirksliga Westfalen 11 (VIII)
- 2015–16: 3rd
Home colours	Away colours

VfB Hüls is a German association football club from Marl, North Rhine-Westphalia.

== History ==
The club was founded on 22 July 1948 as Eintracht Lippe and then renamed Verein für Rasenspiele 1948 e.V. Marl-Hüls on 27 January 1951. VfR merged with SuS Drewer-Süd in 1976 to create the current club. After claiming the title in the fifth division Verbandsliga Westfalen in 1997 the club was promoted to the Oberliga Westfalen (IV). In 2007 it was demoted to the Verbandsliga but won their division championship the next year to go back to the new NRW-Liga (V). In 2012 the NRW-Liga was dissolved and after four seasons there, 'VfR' was one of the clubs specially promoted to the Regionalliga West (IV) but was relegated after a 17th-place finish back to the refounded Oberliga Westfalen (V). The club finished in 16th place in 2015 but announced its restart in the Bezirksliga (VIII) for next season.

== Stadium ==
VfB Hüls plays its home matches in the Stadion am Badeweiher which has a capacity of 6,000.

== Honours ==
The club's honours:

- Oberliga Westfalen
  - Champions: 2000
- Westfalenliga – Group 1
  - Champions: 1990, 1994, 2008
