= FC Eintracht Rheine =

German football club

- Full name: Fußballclub Eintracht Rheine e. V.
- Founded: 2011
- Ground: Delsen
- Capacity: 7,500
- Chairman: Michael Kortevoss
- Manager: Uwe Laurenz
- League: Oberliga Westfalen (V)
- 2025–26: Oberliga Westfalen, 9th of 18
Home colours	Away colours

FC Eintracht Rheine is a German association football club from the city of Rheine, North Rhine-Westphalia.

== History ==
Logo of predecessor SC Borussia Rheine ca. 1930–31

The club was formed through the 10 June 1994 union of VfB Rheine and SG Eintracht Rheine. That merger actually shrouds a far more complex heritage that includes 18 individual predecessors dating back to 1907 on VfB's side and another 5 clubs going back to 1920 on SG's. Of these myriad ancestral clubs the best historical results were earned by SC Bourussia Rheine, founded in 1923, which played in the early rounds of the 1927–28 and 1930–31 national championship playoffs.

The current the club which resulted from the most recent merger took up play in the Verbandsliga Westfalen (V) and won promotion to the Oberliga Westfalen (IV) after taking the fifth division title in 1998. FCE has continued to play fourth tier football since then with their best result coming as a third-place finish in 2000–01. They went on to capture the Westfalenpokal (Westphalia Cup) in 2003 and gain entry to the first round of the German Cup, where they were eliminated 2–0 after extra time in the first round by the second division side VfB Lübeck. During its stay in the Oberliga the team has generally earned mid-table results.

Since 2013 the club has played in the Oberliga Westfalen again after a stint in the Westfalenliga below.

== Stadium ==
The club plays in the Auto-Senger-Stadion in Delsen (capacity 7,500), while the second team uses the Volksbank-Stadion in Uhlenhook.

== Honours ==
The club's honours:

- Verbandsliga Westfalen (V)
  - Champions: 1998
- Westphalia Cup
  - Winners: 2003
