= SuS Stadtlohn =

German sports club

SUS Stadtlohn
- Full name: Spiel- und Sportverein Stadtlohn 19/20 e.V.
- Short name: SUS Stadtlohn
- Founded: 1919
- Based in: Stadtlohn, Germany
- Location: Losberg 4, Stadtlohn
- Colors: blue-white
- Members: ca. 2512 members (2021)

The SuS Stadtlohn (full name: Spiel- und Sportverein Stadtlohn 19/20 e.V.) is the largest sports club in the city of Stadtlohn, North Rhine-Westphalia, Germany. The association was founded in 1919 and has around 2512 members.

The club consists of twelve departments: athletics, sports badges, running, handball, courses, gymnastics, swimming, trampoline, dancing, table tennis, triathlon, and football. Another department is the youth team (J-Team), which represents the interests of the younger athletes in the club. The soccer department has the most members, followed by the athletics and handball departments.

== History ==
In 1919 the SC 1919 Stadtlohn was founded. A year later, the game club DJK 1920 Stadtlohn was founded. Both associations were forced to merge in 1933 under the name TuS Stadtlohn, which was renamed SuS 1945 Stadtlohn on 19 July 1945, and has had its current name since 1947. The former game club DJK 1920 founded an independent club in 1952 with the DJK Stadtlohn. In 2019 the sports club celebrated its 100th anniversary.

=== Soccer ===
The first squad of the soccer division played in the Oberliga Westfalen for 13 seasons, from 1994 through 2017. Its best Oberliga Westfalen league final position was the 5th spot. In 2018–19 it relegated from the 14th place in Landesliga Westfalen 4. In 1919–20 it plays in the Bezirksliga of Westphalia.

== See also ==
- List of clubs in the Oberliga Westfalen
