= Delbrücker SC =

German football club

- Full name: Delbrücker Sport-Club e.V.
- Founded: 1950
- Ground: Stadion Laumeskamp
- League: Westfalenliga 1 (VI)
- 2015–16: 2nd
Home colours	Away colours

Delbrücker SC is a German association football club playing in Delbrück, North Rhine-Westphalia.

== History ==
The origins of the club lie in the founding of the youth's football club DJK Delbrück in 1920. This in turn led to the formation of Ballverein Delbrück in 1925 which took up play in the Westdeutschen Fußballverband (West German Football Federation).

After World War II the club resumed play locally with the youth side enjoying some early success in enjoying an undefeated season and capturing the East Westphalian title before dropping a 1:2 decision in the overall regional final. However, BVD ran into some difficulty involving rough play and attacks on game officials leading to the imposition of a two-year ban. The penalty was sidestepped and the team returned to play after only one year by the dissolution of BVD and subsequent formation of Delbrücker SC in 1950 which began play in the second-class city circuit.

DSC improved to the point that it made regular appearances in the Landesliga (IV) through the 50s and into the early 60s, but then slipped back to city league competition in the Bezirksliga until making a recovery in the mid-70s. The club returned to Landesliga (V) competition and in 1983–84 claimed a division title. Four years later Delbrück again found itself in the Bezirksliga (VII) until once more winning promotion to the Landesliga (VI), this time to steadily improve and advance to the Verbandsliga Westfalen (V) in 2001 and then on into the Oberliga Westfalen (IV) in 2005. With the introduction of 3. Liga in 2008 Oberliga Westfalen was downgraded to the fifth tier and replaced by NRW-Liga where DSC was dropped from it the next year. The club now plays in the tier six Westfalenliga.

In April 2006 Delbrück's 1:0 victory over VfB Fichte Bielefeld in the semi-final of the Westphalia Cup earned the club its first appearance in German Cup play the following September where they lost 2:4 to second division side SC Freiburg.

== Honours ==
The club's honours:

- Verbandsliga Westfalen
  - Champions: 2005
- Landesliga Westfalen
  - Champions: 2001

== Stadium ==
The club has played its home fixtures in Stadion Laumeskamp since 1929.
