= Westfalia Rhynern =

German football club

- Full name: Sportverein Westfalia Rhynern e.V.
- Nickname: Hamm-Rhynern
- Founded: 1935
- Ground: Westfalia-Sportpark
- Capacity: 3,500
- Chairman: Arnulf Kleine
- Manager: Marco Stiepermann
- League: Regionalliga West (IV)
- 2025–26: Oberliga Westfalen 1st of 19 (promoted)
Home colours	Away colours

Westfalia Rhynern is a German association football club from the district of Rhynern in the city of Hamm, Westphalia.

== History ==
The club was established in 1935 as Turn- und Sportverein Rhynern, but disappeared after two years when, like many other clubs, it was caught up in the politically motivated sports policies of the Nazi regime. Following World War II, a group that included many of the club's pre-war membership reformed the club in 1946 as Sportverein Westfalia Rhynern.

The footballers advanced to the Verbandsliga Westfalen (V) in 1997 and two years later narrowly missed promotion to the Oberliga Westfalen (IV) when they finished just two points behind champions SC Herford. In 2002, the team slipped to the Landesliga Westfalen (VI) after losing a decisive match to Borussia Emsdetten. They immediately returned to fifth-tier play the next season and in 2006 finished as runners-up in the division. Westfalia captured the championship in 2010 and moved up to the NRW-Liga (V). Since 2012 the club has played in the tier-five Oberliga Westfalen except for one season in the Regionalliga West in 2017–18.

== Current squad ==
As of 16 February 2018

Note: Flags indicate national team as defined under FIFA eligibility rules; some limited exceptions apply. Players may hold more than one non-FIFA nationality.

No.	Pos.	Nation	Player
1	GK	GER	Christopher Balkenhoff
4	DF	GER	Finn Schubert
5	DF	GER	Philipp Ratz
6	MF	GER	Julius Woitaschek
7	MF	GER	Akhim Seber
8	MF	GER	Jonah Wagner
9	FW	GER	Henrik Koch
10	MF	GER	Lars Warschewski
11	MF	GER	Johannes Thiemann
12	DF	GER	Keanu Diskau
14	FW	ITA	Safwane Errifai
15	DF	GER	Jaron Habekost
17	DF	GER	Patrick Franke

No.	Pos.	Nation	Player
21	MF	GER	Latif-Bilal Alassane
22	DF	GER	Elias Opoku
23	GK	GER	Simon Schilling
24	MF	AUS	Connor Riley McLeod
25	DF	GER	Lamine Kaurouma
27	FW	GER	Lennart Koerdt
28	MF	GER	Rafael Miguel Lopez Zapata
30	DF	GER	Melih Sayin
33	DF	GER	Elias Kourouma
35	DF	GER	Michael Wiese
38	MF	GER	Emmanuel De Lemos
49	FW	TUR	Koray Dağ

== Honours ==
The club's honours:

- Westfalenliga – Group 1
  - Champions: 2010
- Oberliga Westfalen
  - Champions: 2026

== Recent seasons ==
Recent seasons of the club:

Season	League	Place
2004–05	Verbandsliga Westfalen I (VI)	4th
2005–06	Verbandsliga Westfalen I	2nd
2006–07	Verbandsliga Westfalen I	4th
2007–08	Verbandsliga Westfalen I	4th
2008–09	Verbandsliga Westfalen I	8th
2009–10	Verbandsliga Westfalen I	2nd
2010–11	NRW-Liga (V)	4th
2011–12	NRW-Liga	11th
2012–13	Oberliga Westfalen (V)	6th
2013–14	Oberliga Westfalen	7th
2014–15	Oberliga Westfalen	3rd
2015–16	Oberliga Westfalen	5th
2016–17	Oberliga Westfalen	2nd
2017–18	Regionalliga West (IV)	18th
