= Oberliga Westfalen =

Association football league in Westphalia, Germany

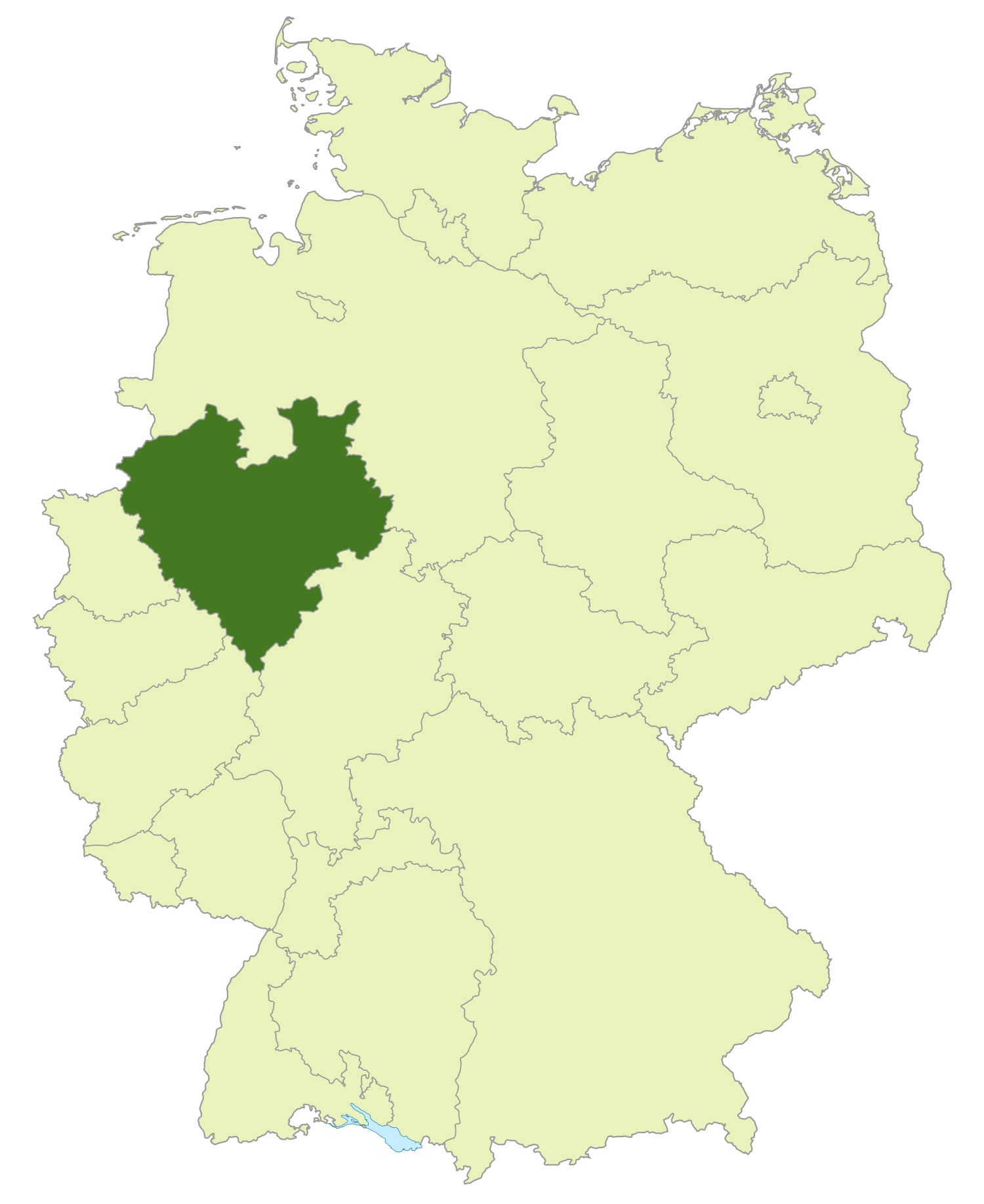
- Organising body: Westphalian Football and Athletics Association
- Founded: 1978 (reformed in 2012 after disbanding in 2008)
- Country: Germany
- State: North Rhine-Westphalia
- Region: Westphalia
- Number of clubs: 18
- Level on pyramid: Level 5
- Promotion to: Regionalliga West
- Relegation to: Westfalenliga (2 divisions)
- Current champions: Sportfreunde Siegen (2024–25)
- Website: www.oberliga-westfalen.de
- Current: 2026–27 Oberliga Westfalen

The Oberliga Westfalen is the highest level football league in the region of Westphalia, which is part of the state of North Rhine-Westphalia. The league existed from 1978 to 2008, but was then replaced by the NRW-Liga, a new statewide league. With the reform of the league system in 2012, which reduced the Regionalliga West to clubs from North Rhine-Westphalia only and disbanded the NRW-Liga below it, the Oberliga Westfalen was reintroduced as the highest tier in the region and the fifth level overall in Germany. It is one of fourteen Oberligas in German football, the fifth tier of the German football league system.

== Overview ==
The league was formed in 1978 as a highest level of play for the region of Westphalia, which used to be split into two groups and covered the eastern half of the state of North Rhine-Westphalia. The main reason for the creation of this league was to allow its champion direct promotion to the 2nd Bundesliga Nord rather than having to go through a promotion play-off. The league was created from nine clubs from the Verbandsliga Westfalen-Nordost and eight from the Verbandsliga Westfalen-Südwest. The SC Herford was relegated from the 2. Bundesliga Nord to the new league.

The league was founded as the Amateur-Oberliga Westfalen, but from 1994 the name was shortened to Oberliga Westfalen.

With the introduction of the unified 2nd Bundesliga in 1981, direct promotion for the Oberliga champions became impossible again because there were eight of them competing for four promotion spots. The champion of the Oberliga Westfalen had to compete with the winner and the runner-up of the Oberliga Nord and the winners of the Oberliga Berlin and of the Oberliga Nordrhein for two 2. Bundesliga spots.

Upon creation of the Regionalligas in 1994, the champions of the Oberligas were directly promoted again, however the Oberligas slipped to fourth tier in the German football league system. The top six team of the Oberliga that year were admitted to the new Regionalliga West/Südwest, the clubs being:

- TuS Paderborn-Neuhaus
- SC Preußen Münster
- Arminia Bielefeld
- SpVgg Erkenschwick
- SC Verl
- SG Wattenscheid 09 II

With the reduction of the number of Regionalligas from four to two in 2000, the Oberliga Westfalen was now located below the Regionalliga Nord. However, the Sportfreunde Siegen, based in the very south of the region, played in the Regionalliga Süd.

With the creation of the 3rd Liga in 2008 the Oberliga Westfalen was replaced by the NRW-Liga, which now is the fifth tier of the league system. The Oberliga Westfalen ceased to exist after 30 seasons. Its clubs were split up over three league levels. The first four teams were promoted to the new Regionalliga West, clubs from place five to eleven went to the new Oberliga while the bottom seven teams were relegated to the Verbandsligas.

The league was reintroduced in 2012 after the NRW-Liga was disbanded again.

Throughout the league's existence the two leagues below the Oberliga were:

- Verbandsliga Westfalen 1
- Verbandsliga Westfalen 2

== Champions of the Oberliga Westfalen ==
The league champions:

=== Original league 1978 to 2008 ===
The league champions of the first era of the league:

Season	Club
1978–79	SC Herford
1979–80	SpVgg Erkenschwick
1980–81	1. FC Paderborn
1981–82	TuS Schloß Neuhaus
1982–83	SC Eintracht Hamm
1983–84	FC Gütersloh
1984–85	SC Eintracht Hamm
1985–86	ASC Schöppingen
1986–87	SpVgg Erkenschwick
1987–88	Preußen Münster
1988–89	Preußen Münster
1989–90	Arminia Bielefeld
1990–91	SC Verl
1991–92	Preußen Münster
1992–93	Preußen Münster

Season	Club
1993–94	SC Paderborn 07
1994–95	FC Gütersloh
1995–96	LR Ahlen
1996–97	Sportfreunde Siegen
1997–98	Borussia Dortmund II
1998–99	VfL Bochum II
1999–2000	VfB Hüls
2000–01	SC Paderborn 07
2001–02	Borussia Dortmund II
2002–03	FC Schalke 04 II
2003–04	Arminia Bielefeld II
2004–05	SG Wattenscheid 09
2005–06	Borussia Dortmund II
2006–07	SC Verl
2007–08	Preußen Münster

=== New league from 2012 ===
The league champions and runners-up from 2012 onwards:

Season	Champions	Runners-up
2012–13	SV Lippstadt 08	SG Wattenscheid 09
2013–14	Arminia Bielefeld II	SV Rödinghausen
2014–15	TuS Erndtebrück	Rot-Weiss Ahlen
2015–16	Sportfreunde Siegen	SpVgg Erkenschwick
2016–17	TuS Erndtebrück	Westfalia Rhynern
2017–18	SV Lippstadt 08	1. FC Kaan-Marienborn
2018–19	FC Schalke 04 II	TuS Haltern
2019–20	SC Wiedenbrück	Rot Weiss Ahlen
2020–21	None	None
2021–22	1. FC Kaan-Marienborn	SG Wattenscheid 09
2022–23	FC Gütersloh	Preußen Münster II
2023–24	Sportfreunde Lotte	Türkspor Dortmund
2024–25	Sportfreunde Siegen	VfL Bochum II

== Placings in the Oberliga Westfalen ==
The final league placings in the second era of the league from 2012 to present:

Club	13	14	15	16	17	18	19	20	21	22	23	24	25
SV Rödinghausen		2	R	R	R	R	R	R	R	R	R	R	R
FC Schalke 04 II	R	R	R	R	R	6	1	R	R	R	R	R	R
SC Wiedenbrück	R	R	R	R	R	R	R	1	R	R	R	R	R
FC Gütersloh 2000	8	10	13	12	10	16	10	11	1	5	1	R	R
SC Paderborn 07 II				16	12	13	7	6	15	3	3	R	R
Sportfreunde Lotte	R	R	R	R	3L	3L	3L	R	R	R	4	1	R
Türkspor Dortmund												2	R
Sportfreunde Siegen	R	R	R	1	R	11	12	14	10	9	14	7	1
Vfl Bochum II													2
ASC 09 Dortmund			12	15	14	3	3	13	5	6	7	3	3
Westfalia Rhynern	6	7	3	5	2	R	5	5	3	4	6	10	4
Eintracht Rheine		8	10	7	5	8	15	4	18	7	10	16	5
SV Schermbeck	17			17			6	12	16	10	12	8	6
SV Lippstadt 08	1	R	5	6	6	1	R	R	R	R	R	R	7
SG Wattenscheid 09	2	R	R	R	R	R	R	R	9	2	R	13	8
Preußen Münster II								10	11	12	2	6	9
1. FC Gievenbeck	18						18				13	5	10
SpVgg Vreden									8	11	11	9	11
Rot-Weiss Ahlen	9	9	2	R	R	14	9	2	R	R	R	R	13
SG Finnentrop/Bamenohl									17	14	9	11	14
TSV Victoria Clarholz									19	15	8	15	15
TuS Ennepetal	14	12	9	11	9	12	13	8	12	16	16	12	16
SpVgg Erkenschwick	5	3	6	2	18							4	17
Concordia Wiemelhausen													18
TuS Bövinghausen											5	14	19
FC Brünninghausen					11	7	17					17	
TSG Sprockhövel	10	11	14	3	R	10	4	15	4	13	15	18	
1. FC Kaan-Marienborn					7	2	R	9	6	1	R		
TuS Erndtebrück	4	5	1	R	1	R	14	17	14	8	17		
Delbrücker SC											18		
RSV Meinerzhagen								3	7	17			
Hammer SpVg	12	13	11	14	3	4	16	18	21	18			
Holzwickeder SC							11	7	2	19			
TuS Haltern						5	2	R	13	20			
Westfalia Herne	16	15	18			9	8	16	20	21			
Arminia Bielefeld II	3	1	8	10	13	15							
SC Hassel					8	17							
TSV Marl-Hüls				9	4	18							
SuS Neuenkirchen	7	4	15	8	15								
SC Roland Beckum	11	6	4	4	16								
SuS Stadtlohn			7	13	17								
SC Zweckel		14	17	18									
VfB Hüls	R	16	16										
TuS Heven	13	17											
TuS Dornberg	15	18											

== Founding members of the Oberliga Westfalen ==
From the 2nd Bundesliga Nord:

- SC Herford

From the Verbandsliga Westfalen-Nordost:

- 1. FC Paderborn
- VfB Rheine
- TuS Schloß Neuhaus
- SV Ahlen
- Bünder SV
- SV Emsdetten
- SV Beckum
- DJK Gütersloh (merged with Arminia Gütersloh to form FC Gütersloh in 1978)
- TSG Harsewinkel

From the Verbandsliga Westfalen-Südwest:

- SpVgg Erkenschwick
- VfL Gevelsberg
- Sportfreunde Siegen
- DJK Hellweg Lütgendortmund
- SuS Hüsten 09
- SV Holzwickede
- Eintracht Recklinghausen
- VfB Altena
