= TSG Sprockhövel =

German football club

- Full name: Turn- und Sportgemeinschaft 1881 Sprockhövel e.V.
- Founded: 1881
- Ground: Im Baumhof
- Capacity: 3,500
- Chairman: Ulrich Meister
- Manager: Andrius Balaika
- League: Oberliga Westfalen (V)
- 2025–26: Oberliga Westfalen, 12th of 18
Home colours	Away colours

TSG 1881 Sprockhövel is a German association football club based in Sprockhövel, North Rhine-Westphalia. With over 2,500 members, TSG is the largest sport club in the town and includes departments for athletics, badminton, basketball, budō, dance, gymnastics, handball, swimming, table tennis, tennis, triathlon, volleyball, and various fitness activities.

== History ==
The roots of the club go back to the establishment in 1881 of Turngemeinde Sprockhövel which later became Turnverein Sprockhövel. In 1938, TV merged with Sportverein Sprockhövel, which was formed in 1907 and renamed Athene Sprockhövel in 1909, to create the current day club. Between 1922 and 1927 the team played in the highest level regional league where it faced sides such Schalke 04, MSV Duisburg, and Borussia Dortmund.

TSG spent several decades in lower tier local play until a series of promotions; first to the Landesliga (VI) in 1996, the Verbandsliga Westfalen Südwest (V) in 1997, and to the Oberliga Westfalen (IV) for the first time in 2000. Since then the club has played as an elevator side, moving up and down frequently between fourth- and fifth-tier play, and last won promotion to the Oberliga Westfalen (V) again in 2012. A third-place finish in the Oberliga in 2015–16 earned the club direct promotion to the Regionalliga West after runners-up SpVgg Erkenschwick declined, but they were relegated back to the Oberliga after just one season.

== Honours ==
The club's honours:

- Verbandsliga Westfalen – Group 2 (V)
  - Champions: 2000, 2002, 2007, 2009

== Stadium ==
Sprockhövel plays its home matches at Im Baumhof which was opened in 1936 and has a capacity of 3,500.
