= Westfalenliga =

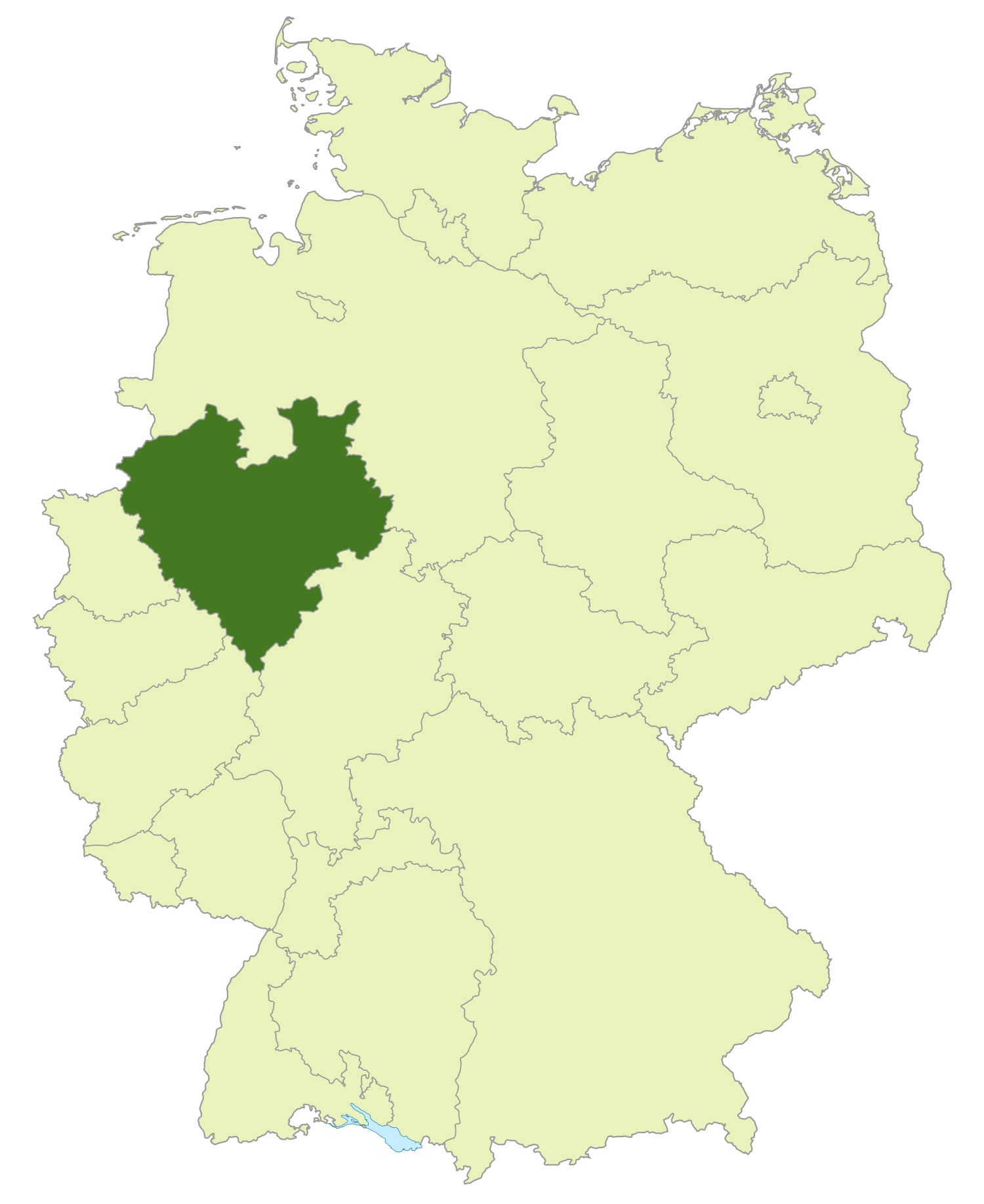
- Organising body: Westphalian Football and Athletics Association
- Founded: 1956
- Country: Germany
- State: North Rhine-Westphalia
- Region: Westphalia
- Divisions: 2
- Number of clubs: 35
- Level on pyramid: Level 6
- Promotion to: Oberliga Westfalen
- Relegation to: Landesliga Westfalen (4 divisions)
- Current champions: Group 1: Delbrücker SC; Group 2: TuS Bövinghausen (2021–22)

The Westfalenliga (formerly the Verbandsliga Westfalen) is the second highest amateur football league in the region of Westphalia which is part of the state of North Rhine-Westphalia and the sixth tier of the German football league system. It operates in two groups which run parallel below the Oberliga Westfalen. Until the introduction of the 3. Liga in 2008 it was the fifth tier of the league system, until the introduction of the Regionalligas in 1994 the fourth tier.

== Overview ==
The league was formed as a tier-three league under the name Verbandsliga Westfalen in two groups of 16 clubs in 1956 to provide a more streamlined top level for the regional football governing body, the Westphalian Football Association. In earlier years, the Landesliga Westfalen, operated in five groups, was the highest levels of football in the region. The Landesliga still remains as the tier below the Verbandsliga until today.

Despite being operated in two groups, called Nordost or (Gruppe 1) and Südwest or (Gruppe 2), the Verbandsliga Westfalen has to be seen as one league with two regional groups as clubs have been moved frequently between groups, according to geographical needs. The administration and history of the two groups have always been closely tied.

In the early years, the league held a championship series between the two group winners for the title of Westphalian champions at the end of the season. The winner of this series however was not automatically the team promoted to the tier-two 2. Oberliga West. Instead, promotion was determined by a series of games involving the two Verbandsliga Westfalen group winners as well as the champions of the Verbandsliga Niederrhein and Verbandsliga Mittelrhein. This championship series was abandoned after the Oberliga Westfalen was introduced in 1978 as a highest league for the region.

With the introduction of the Bundesliga in 1963, the Verbandsliga came a feeder the also new implemented Regionalliga West but remained, unchanged otherwise, as the third tier of the league system. The same applied when the Regionalliga was replaced by the 2nd Bundesliga Nord in 1974. The league champions however now had to gain promotion through a play-off system with the winners of the other tier-three leagues in northern Germany.

In 1978, the Amateur-Oberliga Westfalen was formed as the third tier of football in Westfalen. One of the main reasons for this move was to provide direct promotion for the tier-three champions again. The clubs placed one to nine in each Verbandsliga group were admitted to the new Oberliga. The Verbandsliga became the feeder league for the new Oberliga, but now as a tier-four competition. Both champions, and some years one or both runners-up, were directly promoted to Oberliga. With the re-introduction of the Regionalligen in 1994, the league slipped to tier-five but remained unchanged otherwise.

In 2008, with the introduction of the 3. Liga, the Verbandsliga was downgraded to the sixth tier. Also, the league now became a feeder to the new founded NRW-Liga, a merger of the Oberliga Nordrhein and the Oberliga Westfalen. The champions of both Verbandsliga groups were still directly promoted. Promotions for the runners-up was abolished due to the merger. The league also changed their name to Westfalenliga.

In 2012 the Oberliga Westfalen was reintroduced as the league above the Westfalenliga, replacing the NRW-Liga again. The number of Landesligas below the Westfalenliga was also reduced from five to four.

== League champions ==
From 1957 to 1978 a championship decider was played to determine the Westfalen champion, usually played on home-and-away base with a third game if necessary. Some seasons however, there was only one game, on neutral ground and in 1966 and 1968 no games were played.

Season	Group 1	Group 2
1957	SpVgg Beckum	**Sportfreunde Gladbeck**	5-1	3-3	-
1958	**SpVgg Erkenschwick**	FV Hombruch 09	2-3	3-7	-
1959	SpVgg Beckum	Sportfreunde Siegen	2-0	2-1	-
1960	BV Selm	**SSV Hagen**	1-3	3-0	2-1
1961	Germania Datteln	**Sportfreunde Siegen**	0-3	5-0	2-0
1962	**Arminia Bielefeld**	BV Brambauer	2-1	0-0	-
1963	VfB 03 Bielefeld	Lüner SV	-	-	1-3
1964	**Eintracht Gelsenkirchen**	SC Dortmund 95	1-1	2-2	2-0
1965	SpVgg Erkenschwick	**VfL Bochum**	1-4	3-2	1-1
1966	**Hammer SpVg**	**SSV Hagen**	-	-	-
1967	SpVgg Erkenschwick	**Lüner SV**	-	-	0-0
1968	SpVgg Erkenschwick	SSV Hagen	-	-	-
1969	**DJK Gütersloh**	**SG Wattenscheid 09**	-	-	3-1
1970	**Eintracht Gelsenkirchen**	**Westfalia Herne**	-	-	2-1
1971	**Arminia Gütersloh**	**VfL Klafeld-Geisweid**	-	-	1-0
1972	STV Horst-Emscher	**Sportfreunde Siegen**	3-1	0-4	6-7
1973	VfB 03 Bielefeld	**Rot-Weiß Lüdenscheid**	-	-	2-1
1974	SC Recklinghausen	TuS Neuenrade	0-3	2-4	-
1975	Arminia Gütersloh	**Westfalia Herne**	0-2	2-4	-
1976	**SC Herford**	SV Holzwickede	3-1	1-2	-
1977	Arminia Gütersloh	**Rot-Weiß Lüdenscheid**	2-6	2-0	-
1978	1. FC Paderborn	**DSC Wanne-Eickel**	0-2	2-1	-

- Promoted teams in **bold.**
- In 1965, VfL Bochum won by coin flip.
- In 1966 and 1968, no champion was determined; in 1967 the contest was drawn.
- In 1969, SpVgg Erkenschwick, runners-up of Group 1, was also promoted.

With the introduction of the Oberliga Westfalen in 1978, the winner of this league was the official champion of Westfalen, deciders between the two Verbandsliga champions were therefore unnecessary. League winners were automatically promoted, some seasons the runners-up too.

Year	Group 1	Group 2	Promoted runners-up
1979	VfB Waltrop	Teutonia Lippstadt	-
1980	Hammer SpVg	STV Horst-Emscher	-
1981	SC Eintracht Hamm	Lüner SV	-
1982	ASC Schöppingen	VfL Bochum II	-
1983	FC Gohfeld	SV Langendreer 04	-
1984	VfL Reken	Hellweg Lütgendortmund	-
1985	1. FC Recklinghausen	SuS Hüsten 09	-
1986	SC Verl	SG Wattenscheid 09 II	-
1987	SpVgg Marl	Borussia Dortmund II	SC Buer-Hassel
1988	VfB Rheine	Sportfreunde Siegen	-
1989	SpVgg Beckum	VfR Sölde	VfL Bochum II
1990	VfB Hüls	Rot-Weiß Lüdenscheid	1. FC Recklinghausen
1991	FC Gütersloh	VfL Gevelsberg	-
1992	FC Schalke 04 II	Sportfreunde Siegen	SV Brakel, SG Wattenscheid 09 II
1993	TSG Dülmen	SV Holzwickede	-
1994	VfB Hüls	Sportfreunde Siegen	-
1995	TuS Ahlen	Sportfreunde Oestrich-Iserlohn	SV Rotthausen
1996	TSG Dülmen	TuS Hordel	-
1997	Blau-Weiß Recklinghausen	FC Schalke 04 II	VfL Bochum II
1998	FC Eintracht Rheine	VfB Kirchhellen	SV Lippstadt 08, SV Langendreer
1999	SC Herford	Westfalia Herne	SV Rotthausen
2000	Lüner SV	TSG Sprockhövel	-
2001	VfB Fichte Bielefeld	SC Buer-Hassel	Hövelhofer SV
2002	Arminia Bielefeld II	TSG Sprockhövel	SpVgg Emsdetten, Sportfreunde Siegen II
2003	LR Ahlen II	SV Schermbeck	Vorwärts Kornharpen
2004	Sportfreunde Lotte	SpVgg Erkenschwick	-
2005	Delbrücker SC	Westfalia Herne	-
2006	Hammer SpVg	DSC Wanne-Eickel	Sportfreunde Oestrich-Iserlohn
2007	SV Schermbeck	TSG Sprockhövel	SC Wiedenbrück 2000, DJK Germania Gladbeck
2008	VfB Hüls	SG Wattenscheid 09	-
2009	SC Wiedenbrück 2000	TSG Sprockhövel	-
2010	Westfalia Rhynern	SpVgg Erkenschwick	-
2011	TuS Dornberg	TuS Erndtebrück	-
2012	SV Lippstadt 08	SG Wattenscheid 09	see note
2013	SV Rödinghausen	SV Zweckel	Eintracht Rheine
2014	SuS Stadtlohn	ASC 09 Dortmund	-
2015	TSV Marl-Hüls	SC Paderborn 07 II	SV Schermbeck
2016	SC Hassel	FC Brünninghausen	1. FC Kaan-Marienborn
2017	TuS Haltern	Westfalia Herne	-
2018	1. FC Gievenbeck	Holzwickeder SC	SV Schermbeck
2019	SC Preußen Münster II	RSV Meinerzhagen	-
2020	TSV Victoria Clarholz	SG Finnentrop/Bamenohl	SpVgg Vreden	-
2021	No winner	No winner	-
2022	Delbrücker SC	TuS Bövinghausen	1. FC Gievenbeck

- In 2006, DSC Wanne-Eickel was refused promotion.
- In 2012, because of the recreation of the Oberliga Westfalen, Hammer SpVgg, FC Gütersloh 2000, SC Roland Beckum, 1. FC Gievenbeck, SuS Neuenkirchen, SpVgg Erkenschwick, TuS Heven, TuS Ennepetal and TSG Sprockhövel were also promoted.
- In 2021, the season curtailed and annulled during the COVID-19 pandemic in Germany.
