= TSV Marl-Hüls =

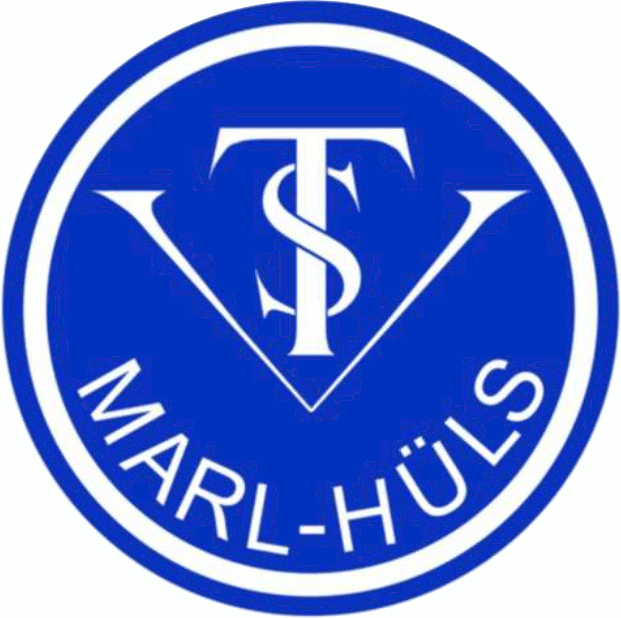
- Full name: Turn- und Sportverein Marl-Hüls 1912 e.V.
- Founded: 1912
- Ground: Loekampstadion
- Capacity: 1,500
- Chairman: Bertram Weh
- Manager: Marvin Pulver
- League: Kreisliga B Recklinghausen (X)
- 2018–19: Westfalenliga 2 (VI), 17th (Withdrawn)
Home colours	Away colours

TSV Marl-Hüls is a German association football club from the town of Marl, North Rhine-Westphalia.

In 1954 TSV took out the German amateur football championship and also made a losing appearance in the final of this competition in 1972. The club's most successful era was from 1960 to 1963 when it played in the tier one Oberliga West. In recent history the club's greatest success has been promotion to the tier five Oberliga Westfalen in 2015, only to be undone by financial unsustainability.

Apart from football the club also offers other sports like table tennis, volleyball and badminton.

== History ==
Formed in 1912 the club played as a non-descript side in local football for the most part of the first forty years of its existence. It began a rise through the league system when it won promotion to the tier three Landesliga Westfalen in 1949. TSV played at this level until 1954, generally achieving good results which culminated in promotion to the 2. Oberliga West. It also qualified for the German amateur football championship where the club defeated SpVgg Neu-Isenburg 6–1 in the 1954 final.

TSV Marl-Hüls played in the second tier 2. Oberliga for the next six seasons until 1960 and, after a difficult first season, established itself as a strong side. In 1959–60 the club finished runners-up and earned promotion to the tier one Oberliga West. In the Oberliga TSV struggled, finishing twelfth, fourteenth and sixteenth in its three seasons there. In 1962–63 it was the only Oberliga West club not to apply for a place in the new Bundesliga when it was introduced.

TSV Marl-Hüls became part of the Regionalliga West from 1963, the new second tier below the Bundesliga. It finished fourth in its first season there, the best result in the club's seven seasons there until 1970. After relegation at the end of the 1969–70 season TSV played in the north east division of the tier three Verbandsliga Westfalen. A runners-up finish there in 1972 qualified the team for the German amateur championship for a second time. TSV made another appearance in the final of the competition but this time was beaten 2–1 by FSV Frankfurt.

From 1974 onwards the club's fortunes declined with the team being relegated from the Verbandsliga in 1976. TSV returned to the Verbandsliga in 1978 after the league had dropped to the fourth tier through the introduction of the Oberliga Westfalen above it. The team moved between the north east and south west divisions of the Verbandsliga until 1987, when it was relegated again.

After a lengthy stay in the lower leagues of Westphalia, predominantly in the Bezirksliga, TSV Marl-Hüls made a recovery from 2010 onwards. It won its Bezirksliga division in 2011 and moved up to the Westfalenliga the season after. After three seasons there a league championship in 2014–15 took the team up to the tier five Oberliga Westfalen for the first time. The team's highest finish in the Oberliga was 4th in 2016–17, a season which was marred by financial irregularities. In September 2017 the entire board of the football department, including an incumbent head coach, resigned due to disagreements with the club management. The club's economic instability became apparent when it forcibly withdrew its first team from the Oberliga later in October after its players refused to cut back on their purchases, resulting in a return to the Westfalenliga. Unfortunately, TSV's attempts to cut its losses failed after the club declared its insolvency in January 2019, leading to another withdrawal, this time from the Westfalenliga, in March. The first team initially eyed a possible entry into the Kreisliga C, the lowest level in Westphalia, joining the Kreisliga B instead.

== Honours ==
The club's honours:

- German amateur championship
  - Champions: 1954
  - Runners-up: 1972
- 2. Oberliga West
  - Runners-up: 1960
- Westfalenliga 2
  - Champions: 2015

== Recent seasons ==
The recent season-by-season performance of the club:

Season	Division	Tier	Position
2003–04	Bezirksliga Group 12	VII	4th
2004–05	Bezirksliga Group 12	VII	9th
2005–06	Bezirksliga Group 12	VII	7th
2006–07	Bezirksliga Group 12	VII	3rd
2007–08	Bezirksliga Group 12	VII	5th
2008–09	Bezirksliga Group 12	VIII	5th
2009–10	Bezirksliga Group 12	VIII	4th
2010–11	Bezirksliga Group 12	VIII	1st ↑
2011–12	Landesliga Group 4	VII	4th ↑
2012–13	Westfalenliga 1	VI	6th
2013–14	Westfalenliga 2	VI	4th
2014–15	Westfalenliga 2	VI	1st ↑
2015–16	Oberliga Westfalen	V	9th
2016–17	Oberliga Westfalen	V	4th
2017–18	Oberliga Westfalen	V	17th (W) ↓
2018–19	Westfalenliga 2	VI	17th (W) ↓
2019–20	Kreisliga B2 Recklinghausen	X	

- With the introduction of the Regionalligas in 1994 and the 3. Liga in 2008 as the new third tier, below the 2. Bundesliga, all leagues below dropped one tier.

↑ Promoted	↓ Relegated

== Stadium ==
The club's former home ground, the Jahnstadion, has fallen into disrepair and the main grand stand has been condemned and was scheduled to be demolished. The club nowadays plays in the smaller Loekampstadion.
