= SV Schermbeck =

German football club

- Full name: Sportverein Schermbeck 1912 e.V.
- Founded: 1912
- Ground: Volksbankarena
- Chairman: Johannes Brilo
- Manager: Martin Stroetzel
- League: Westfalenliga 1 (VI)
- 2015–16: Oberliga Westfalen (V), 17th (relegated)
| Home colours | Away colours |

SV Schermbeck is a German association football club from Schermbeck, North Rhine-Westphalia. The footballers are part of a larger sports club that also has departments for athletics, badminton, handball, swimming, table tennis, and water polo.

== History ==
An informal gymnastics group emerged in Schermbeck in the summer of 1912 and, with the support of local club Weseler Turnverein, a sports meet was held on 16 August that year to raise funds for the establishment of a new club. This led to the formation of Schermbecker Turnverein which claimed a membership of 62 by 1 January 1913. The club suspended its activities in mid-1917 because of World War I, not taking up sport again until late 1919, following the end of the conflict.

Historical logo of SV Schermbeck ca. 1912(?)-65.

A football department was soon formed within the club, however by the early 30s the popularity of the sport in the Schermbeck area was challenged by a local enthusiasm for fistball. The football club Grün-Weiß Schermbeck, formed in 1934, merged with TV Schermbeck on 1 November 1934 to form Turn- und Sportverein Schermbeck in an attempt to sustain a football department within the club. However, the senior sides soon faded away, leaving only youth teams active by 1937. The subsequent collapse of the club's management and the outbreak of World War II led to the association again suspending operations. Following the war the club was re-established as Spielverein Schermbeck and included football and athletics departments.

The club enjoyed some limited success in the 60s, advancing out of their local league and into district level competition. In the late 90s Schermbeck failed in its attempt to win promotion to the Landesliga Westfalen (VI) on three consecutive occasions, until finally advancing to the Landesliga Westfalen (VI) in 2000 and then winning promotion to the Verbandsliga Westfalen (V) the next year. Just two seasons later the club was again promoted, this time to the Oberliga Westfalen (IV). After two 13th-place results, they were relegated in 2006 following a 16th-place finish, but promptly returned to the Oberliga after a Verbandsliga title in 2006–07. Relegated again in 2013 the club played in the tier six Westfalenliga for two seasons where a runners-up finish in 2015 qualified it for the promotion round to the Oberliga. After defeating Westfalia Wickede 3–0 the club returned to the Oberliga but was relegated again after finishing 17th in 2015–16.

== Honours ==
The club's honours:

- Verbandsliga Westfalen
  - Champions: 2003, 2007
  - Runners-up: 2015
- Landesliga Westfalen
  - Champions: 2001
