= SpVgg Erkenschwick =

German football club

- Full name: Spielvereingung 1916 Erkenschwick e.V.
- Founded: 9 June 1916; 110 years ago
- Ground: Stimbergstadion
- Capacity: 14,380
- Chairman: Hermann Silvers
- Manager: Magnus Niemöller
- League: Oberliga Westfalen (V)
- 2025–26: Oberliga Westfalen, 13th of 18
Home colours	Away colours

SpVgg Erkenschwick is a German football club based in Oer-Erkenschwick in North Rhine-Westphalia.

== History ==
Founded as Sportverein Erkenschwick in 1916, they joined Emscher-Lippe-Spielverband to form Sportfreunde Erkenschwick in 1918, which in then merged with Turn- und Leichtathletikverein TV Erkenschwick in 1921 to form the sports club still known today as TuS 09 Erkenschwick. The football side separated from this club and joined the footballers from Blau-Weiss Oer to form SpVgg Erkenschwick.

The side was competitive from 1943 through to 1953, playing top-flight football in the Gauliga Westfalen until the end of World War II and in the Oberliga West (I) immediately after the war.

Through the 1970s, 1980s, and 1990s, Erkenschwick played as a third division side with just three seasons spent in the 2. Bundesliga (1974–75, 1975–76, and 1980–81). At the turn of the century they slipped to fourth and fifth level competition, and, since 2012, play in Oberliga Westfalen (V) again.

== Honours ==
The club's honours:

- Oberliga Westfalen (III)
  - Champions: 1980, 1987
- Verbandsliga Westfalen Nordost (IV)
  - Champions: 1965, 1967, 1968
- Verbandsliga Westfalen Südwest (V)
  - Champions: 2004
- Westphalia Cup
  - Winners: 1987, 1993
