= 2014–15 Oberliga Niederrhein =

Oberliga Niederrhein
- Season: 2014–15
- Champions: SSVg Velbert
- Relegated: SV Sonsbeck Sportfreunde Baumberg VdS Nievenheim VfB Homberg
- Matches: 306
- Top goalscorer: Philipp Goris (24 goals)
- Total attendance: 111,058
- Average attendance: 363

The 2014–15 Oberliga Niederrhein was the 59th season of the Oberliga Niederrhein, one of three state association league systems in the state of North Rhine-Westphalia, covering its northwestern part. It was the third season of the league as a fifth level of the German football league system.

== League table ==
The league featured four new clubs for the 2014–15 season with 1. FC Bocholt, VfR Krefeld-Fischeln and VdS Nievenheim promoted from the Landesliga Niederrhein while SSVg Velbert had been relegated from the Regionalliga West.

Pos	Team	Pld	W	D	L	GF	GA	GD	Pts	Promotion or relegation
1	SSVg Velbert (C, P)	34	25	5	4	100	38	+62	80	Promotion to Regionalliga West
2	Wuppertaler SV	34	20	9	5	66	29	+37	69	
3	Ratingen 04/19	34	19	7	8	64	40	+24	64	
4	SV Hönnepel-Niedermörmter	34	16	9	9	57	50	+7	57	
5	MSV Duisburg II	34	13	13	8	72	42	+30	52	
6	FC Bocholt	34	14	9	11	55	41	+14	51	
7	TV Jahn Hiesfeld	34	14	8	12	60	58	+2	50	
8	VfR Krefeld-Fischeln	34	15	4	15	53	61	−8	49	
9	TuRU 1880 Düsseldorf	34	14	5	15	51	50	+1	47	
10	TuS Bösinghoven	34	13	7	14	71	64	+7	46	
11	Rot-Weiß Oberhausen	34	13	6	15	51	54	−3	45	
12	Schwarz-Weiß Essen	34	13	5	16	49	48	+1	44	
13	SC Kapellen-Erft	34	12	7	15	62	70	−8	43	
14	VfB 03 Hilden	34	11	9	14	69	76	−7	42	
15	SV Sonsbeck (R)	34	10	7	17	41	66	−25	37	Relegation to Landesliga Niederrhein
16	Sportfreunde Baumberg (R)	34	7	8	19	40	70	−30	29	Relegation to Landesliga Niederrhein
17	VdS Nievenheim (R)	34	8	3	23	37	103	−66	27	Relegation to Landesliga Niederrhein
18	VfB Homberg (R)	34	5	7	22	36	74	−38	22	Relegation to Landesliga Niederrhein

Source: kicker.de, soccerway.com
Rules for classification: 1) Points; 2) Goal difference; 3) Goals scored
(C) Champions; (P) Promoted; (R) Relegated

== Top goalscorers ==
The top goal scorers:

Rank	Player	Club	Goals
1	(Germany) Philipp Goris	Rot-Weiß Oberhausen II	24
2	(Japan) Takehiro Kubo	TuS Bösinghoven	20
2	(Germany) Danny Rankl	TV Jahn Hiesfeld	20
2	(Germany) Jannik Weber	VfB 03 Hilden	20

== Promotion round ==
The runners-up of the three divisions of the Landesliga Niederrhein competed for one more spot in the Oberliga for the following season, with each team playing the other just once:

Pos	Team	Pld	W	D	L	GF	GA	GD	Pts	Promotion, qualification or relegation	SCD	FSV	FCK
1	SC Düsseldorf-West	2	2	0	0	8	0	+8	6	Promotion to Oberliga Niederrhein	—	—	4–0
2	FSV Duisburg	2	0	1	1	0	4	−4	1		0–4	—	—
3	1. FC Kleve	2	0	1	1	0	4	−4	1		—	0–0	—

Source: Fussball.de
Rules for classification: 1) Points; 2) Head-to-head; 3) Decider;
