= Kenan Dünnwald-Turan =

German footballer

Personal information
- Full name: Philipp Kenan Dünnwald-Turan
- Date of birth: 14 November 1995 (age 30)
- Place of birth: Düsseldorf, Germany
- Height: 1.89 m (6 ft 2 in)
- Positions: Forward; winger

Youth career
- –2009: Fortuna Düsseldorf
- 2009–2012: SG Unterrath
- 2012–2014: Rot-Weiß Oberhausen

Senior career*
Years	Team	Apps	(Gls)
2014–2016	MSV Duisburg II	32	(3)
2016–2017	TSG Sprockhövel	4	(0)
2017–2018	Bristol Rovers	1	(0)
2018	→ Weston-super-Mare (loan)	11	(2)
2018–2019	1. FC Kaan-Marienborn	10	(4)
2019	Wuppertaler SV	9	(2)
2019	Fortuna Köln	3	(0)
2019	Fortuna Köln II	4	(0)
2020	Bonner SC	6	(0)
2020–2022	Scunthorpe United	6	(0)
2021	→ Stockport County (loan)	1	(0)
2022–2023	Straelen	23	(3)
2023–2024	Arbroath	21	(0)
2025	Hebar Pazardzhik	15	(3)
2025	Muangthong United	13	(3)
- * Club domestic league appearances and goals as of 00:39, 25 December 2025 (UTC)

Philipp Kenan Dünnwald-Turan (born 14 November 1995) is a German professional footballer who most recently played as a midfielder.

After progressing through the youth ranks of Fortuna Düsseldorf, SG Unterrath and Rot-Weiß Oberhausen, Dünnwald played for both MSV Duisburg II and TSG Sprockhövel before a move to England. In August 2017, he joined Bristol Rovers.

== Career ==
=== MSV Duisburg II ===
In July 2014, Dünnwald joined Oberliga Niederrhein side MSV Duisburg II. On 10 August, he made his debut in a 5–0 victory against Sportfreunde Baumberg. On 6 June 2015, he scored his first goal for the club in a 4–1 win over TV Jahn Hiesfeld on the final day of the season.

On 11 October, he opened the scoring in a 2–2 draw with SpVg Schonnebeck. He added his second goal of the season in a 4–1 win against Düsseldorf-West on 28 March.

=== TSG Sprockhövel ===
In July 2016, he signed for Regionalliga West side TSG Sprockhövel. Dünnwald made his debut in a 2–2 draw with SC Verl on 9 August, and made a further three league appearances for the club. On 17 August, he assisted Hatim Bentaleb's goal in a 1–0 win against VfL Senden in the Westphalian Cup First Round.

=== Bristol Rovers ===
In August 2017, Dünnwald joined EFL League One club Bristol Rovers. On 26 September, he made his debut after coming off the bench for 11 minutes in a 3–0 league defeat to Portsmouth. On 31 October, he replaced Tom Nichols in the 66th minute of a 3–1 EFL Trophy defeat to West Ham United Under-23s. On 2 February 2018, Dünnwald joined National League South side Weston-super-Mare on an initial one month loan. On 9 March, the loan was extended for another month. On 24 May 2018, Dunnwald was announced as one of nine players who had not been offered a new contract for the development squad.

=== Scunthorpe United ===
On 3 September 2020, Dünnwald-Turan returned to English football, joining League Two side Scunthorpe United on a two-year deal. Kenan struggled to make an impact and rarely played and, as a result, he was released at the end of the 2021–22 season.

==== Stockport County (loan) ====
On 11 September 2021, Dünnwald-Turan joined National League club Stockport County on a one-month loan deal. He made one appearance in his time at the club off of the bench in a 3–0 home defeat to Yeovil Town and missed an open net.

=== Arbroath ===
After a season back in Germany with Straelen, Dünnwald-Turan joined Scottish Championship club Arbroath in July 2023.

== Career statistics ==
As of match played 15 January 2022

Appearances and goals by club, season and competition
Club	Season	League			National cup		League cup		Other		Total	
Club	Season	Division	Apps	Goals	Apps	Goals	Apps	Goals	Apps	Goals	Apps	Goals
MSV Duisburg II	2014–15	Oberliga Niederrhein	11	1	—		—		—		11	1
MSV Duisburg II	2015–16	Oberliga Niederrhein	21	2	—		—		—		21	2
MSV Duisburg II	Total		32	3	—		—		—		32	3
TSG Sprockhövel	2016–17	Regionalliga West	4	0	—		—		1 (Note: One appearance in the Westphalian Cup)	0	5	0
Bristol Rovers	2017–18	League One	1	0	0	0	0	0	1 (Note: Appearance in EFL Trophy)	0	2	0
Weston-super-Mare (loan)	2017–18	National League South	11	2	—		—		1 (Note: Appearance in Somerset Premier Cup)	0	12	2
1. FC Kaan-Marienborn	2018–19	Regionalliga West	10	3	—		—		—		10	3
Wuppertaler SV	2018–19	Regionalliga West	9	2	—		—		—		9	2
Fortuna Köln	2019–20	Regionalliga West	3	0	—		—		—		3	0
Fortuna Köln II	2019–20	Oberliga Mittelrhein	4	0	—		—		—		4	0
Bonner SC	2019–20	Regionalliga West	6	0	—		—		—		6	0
Scunthorpe United	2020–21	League Two	5	0	1	0	0	0	0	0	6	0
Scunthorpe United	2021–22	League Two	1	0	0	0	0	0	0	0	1	0
Scunthorpe United	Total		6	0	1	0	0	0	0	0	7	0
Stockport County (loan)	2021–22	National League	1	0	0	0	—		0	0	1	0
Career total			87	10	1	0	0	0	3	0	91	10
