= 2022–23 Oberliga =

Tournament details
- Country: Germany

The 2022–23 season of the Oberliga is the 15th season of the Oberligas, the fifth tier of the German football league system.

== Tables ==
=== Baden-Württemberg ===
==== League table ====
Pos	Team	Pld	W	D	L	GF	GA	GD	Pts	Promotion, qualification or relegation
1	Stuttgarter Kickers (C, P)	34	26	6	2	108	17	+91	84	Promotion to Regionalliga Südwest
2	Sonnenhof Großaspach (Q)	34	22	3	9	66	42	+24	69	Play-off
3	1. CfR Pforzheim	34	21	3	10	80	51	+29	66	
4	1. Göppinger SV	34	16	10	8	57	48	+9	58	
5	ATSV Mutschelbach	34	16	9	9	71	66	+5	57	
6	SV Oberachern	34	14	7	13	57	52	+5	49	
7	FC Holzhausen	34	13	9	12	69	62	+7	48	
8	FSV Hollenbach	34	14	6	14	46	42	+4	48	
9	FSV 08 Bietigheim-Bissingen	34	14	5	15	68	72	−4	47	
10	FC Nöttingen	34	13	6	15	68	66	+2	45	
11	FC 08 Villingen	34	12	8	14	69	62	+7	44	
12	Offenburger FV	34	11	7	16	48	75	−27	40	
13	TSG Backnang 1919	34	11	6	17	56	76	−20	39	
14	SSV Reutlingen 05	34	10	7	17	46	63	−17	37	
15	FV Ravensburg	34	8	13	13	44	62	−18	37	
16	1. FC Rielasingen-Arlen	34	10	7	17	55	77	−22	37	Possible relegation
17	Neckarsulmer SU (R)	34	7	10	17	46	68	−22	31	Relegation
18	Freiburger FC (R)	34	4	6	24	38	91	−53	18	Relegation

Source: Soccerway
(C) Champions; (P) Promoted; (Q) Qualified for the phase indicated; (R) Relegated

=== Bayern Nord ===
==== League table ====
Pos	Team	Pld	W	D	L	GF	GA	GD	Pts	Promotion, qualification or relegation
1	FC Eintracht Bamberg (C, P)	34	23	9	2	75	33	+42	78	Promotion to Regionalliga Bayern
2	DJK Gebenbach	34	23	3	8	92	47	+45	72	Play-off
3	SC Eltersdorf	34	22	5	7	67	32	+35	71	
4	TSV Abtswind	34	19	7	8	64	38	+26	64	
5	SV Donaustauf	34	19	4	11	83	49	+34	61	
6	DJK Ammerthal	34	14	11	9	67	62	+5	53	
7	ASV Cham	34	13	10	11	55	52	+3	49	
8	SSV Jahn Regensburg II	34	13	8	13	74	61	+13	47	
9	TSV Kornburg	34	13	7	14	37	49	−12	46	
10	Würzburger FV	34	13	6	15	50	50	0	45	
11	ASV Neumarkt	34	13	5	16	56	63	−7	44	
12	ATSV Erlangen	34	12	5	17	59	60	−1	41	
13	1. SC Feucht	34	10	11	13	53	75	−22	41	
14	Don Bosco Bamberg (R)	34	10	6	18	47	62	−15	36	Relegation play-offs
15	SpVgg Bayern Hof (O)	34	8	11	15	42	61	−19	35	Relegation play-offs
16	TSV Großbardorf (R)	34	10	4	20	51	68	−17	34	Relegation play-offs
17	SpVgg SV Weiden (R)	34	7	7	20	56	77	−21	28	Relegation play-offs
18	1. FC Geesdorf (R)	34	3	3	28	27	116	−89	12	Relegation

Source: Soccerway
(C) Champions; (O) Play-off winners; (P) Promoted; (R) Relegated

=== Bayern Süd ===
==== League table ====
Pos	Team	Pld	W	D	L	GF	GA	GD	Pts	Promotion, qualification or relegation
1	SV Schalding-Heining (C, P)	34	22	7	5	73	36	+37	73	Promotion to Regionalliga Bayern
2	FC Memmingen (O, P)	34	18	9	7	51	36	+15	63	Play-off
3	TSV Landsberg	34	18	6	10	70	45	+25	60	
4	FC Ingolstadt 04 II	34	17	9	8	64	39	+25	60	
5	TSV Kottern	34	19	3	12	57	44	+13	60	
6	SV Kirchanschöring	34	16	10	8	56	45	+11	58	
7	TSV Schwaben Augsburg	34	15	9	10	63	52	+11	54	
8	TSV 1860 Munich II	34	13	14	7	56	40	+16	53	
9	FC Gundelfingen	34	15	5	14	50	47	+3	50	
10	FC Ismaning	34	14	8	12	47	52	−5	50	
11	TSV 1861 Nördlingen	34	13	7	14	66	64	+2	46	
12	FC Deisenhofen	34	11	11	12	56	47	+9	44	
13	SV Erlbach	34	10	12	12	42	36	+6	42	
14	TSV 1865 Dachau	34	11	7	16	45	61	−16	40	
15	VfR Garching (O)	34	9	7	18	35	56	−21	34	Relegation play-offs
16	Türkspor Augsburg (O)	34	6	5	23	38	79	−41	23	Relegation play-offs
17	TSV 1860 Rosenheim (R)	34	5	6	23	37	83	−46	21	Relegation play-offs
18	VfB Hallbergmoos (R)	34	2	9	23	35	79	−44	15	Relegation

Source: Soccerway
(C) Champions; (O) Play-off winners; (P) Promoted; (R) Relegated

=== Bremen ===
==== League table ====
Pos	Team	Pld	W	D	L	GF	GA	GD	Pts	Qualification or relegation
1	FC Oberneuland (C)	30	23	3	4	98	41	+57	72	
2	SV Hemelingen	30	21	5	4	118	53	+65	68	
3	SG Aumund-Vegesack	30	20	5	5	81	33	+48	65	
4	OSC Bremerhaven	30	19	3	8	68	54	+14	60	Play-off (Note: Only FC Oberneuland and OSC Bremerhaven applied for a Regionalliga license. Oberneuland later decided not to participate for financial reasons.)
5	FC Union 60 Bremen	30	16	5	9	64	55	+9	53	
6	ESC Geestemünde	30	13	6	11	70	62	+8	45	
7	Bremer TS Neustadt	30	13	5	12	64	58	+6	44	
8	TuS Schwachhausen (R)	30	11	6	13	62	68	−6	39	Withdrawal (Note: TuS Schwachhausen withdrew from the Bremen-Liga after the end of the season.)
9	TS Woltmershausen	30	11	6	13	67	78	−11	39	
10	Vatan Sport Bremen	30	11	5	14	51	55	−4	38	
11	Brinkumer SV	30	9	6	15	51	69	−18	33	
12	Blumenthaler SV	30	9	6	15	51	71	−20	33	
13	Leher Turnerschaft	30	7	7	16	58	76	−18	28	
14	TuS Komet Arsten	30	6	7	17	43	80	−37	25	
15	TuSpo Surheide (R)	30	5	5	20	36	66	−30	20	Relegation
16	Werder Bremen III (R)	30	5	2	23	42	105	−63	17	Relegation

Source: Soccerway
(C) Champions; (R) Relegated

=== Hamburg ===
==== League table ====
Pos	Team	Pld	W	D	L	GF	GA	GD	Pts	Qualification or relegation
1	TSV Sasel (C)	36	26	4	6	108	40	+68	82	
2	TuS Dassendorf	36	23	8	5	104	37	+67	77	
3	Eimsbütteler TV (O, P)	36	21	10	5	87	37	+50	73	Play-off (Note: Only Eimsbütteler TV and Altona 93 applied for a Regionalliga license.)
4	Altona 93	36	21	8	7	78	45	+33	71	
5	Niendorfer TSV	36	21	7	8	83	50	+33	70	
6	USC Paloma	36	19	8	9	71	54	+17	65	
7	FC Süderelbe	36	17	6	13	86	61	+25	57	
8	WTSV Concordia	36	16	6	14	72	63	+9	54	
9	HEBC Hamburg	36	13	11	12	58	52	+6	50	
10	Victoria Hamburg	36	14	5	17	80	80	0	47	
11	TuRa Harksheide	36	10	13	13	45	67	−22	43	
12	FC Türkiye Wilhelmsburg	36	12	5	19	65	76	−11	41	
13	FC Union Tornesch	36	10	10	16	53	89	−36	40	
14	TSV Buchholz 08	36	11	6	19	45	79	−34	39	
15	SV Rugenbergen	36	9	8	19	47	75	−28	35	
16	Hamm United (R)	36	9	6	21	45	80	−35	33	Relegation
17	Hamburger SV III (R)	36	9	4	23	55	91	−36	31	Relegation
18	TuS Osdorf (R)	36	7	5	24	45	93	−48	26	Relegation
19	SV Curslack-Neuengamme (R)	36	5	8	23	59	117	−58	23	Relegation

Source: Soccerway
(C) Champions; (O) Play-off winners; (P) Promoted; (R) Relegated

=== Hessen ===
==== League table ====
Pos	Team	Pld	W	D	L	GF	GA	GD	Pts	Promotion, qualification or relegation
1	Eintracht Frankfurt II (C, P)	38	28	5	5	113	35	+78	89	Promotion to Regionalliga Südwest
2	FC Gießen	38	24	10	4	80	41	+39	82	
3	Türk Gücü Friedberg	38	21	7	10	89	64	+25	70	
4	FSV 1926 Fernwald	38	21	6	11	86	58	+28	69	
5	Eint. Stadtallendorf	38	20	5	13	80	51	+29	65	
6	KSV Baunatal	38	18	8	12	67	51	+16	62	
7	Rot-Weiß Walldorf	38	18	6	14	87	68	+19	60	
8	FC Hanau 93	38	16	10	12	71	64	+7	58	
9	SV Steinbach	38	14	10	14	64	60	+4	52	
10	1. FC Erlensee	38	13	10	15	64	60	+4	49	
11	FC Eddersheim	38	12	11	15	53	53	0	47	
12	FC Bayern Alzenau	38	12	11	15	51	60	−9	47	
13	SC Waldgirmes	38	13	7	18	67	73	−6	46	
14	SV Adler Weidenhausen	38	13	6	19	55	83	−28	45	
15	SC Viktoria Griesheim	38	13	5	20	53	89	−36	44	
16	TuS Dietkirchen (O)	38	10	11	17	59	80	−21	41	Relegation play-off
17	SV Unter-Flockenbach (R)	38	11	7	20	65	110	−45	40	Relegation
18	SV Neuhof (R)	38	10	7	21	44	70	−26	37	Relegation
19	SV Rot-Weiß Hadamar (R)	38	11	4	23	57	96	−39	37	Relegation
20	TSV Steinbach Haiger II (R)	38	7	4	27	54	93	−39	25	Relegation

Source: Soccerway
(C) Champions; (O) Play-off winners; (P) Promoted; (R) Relegated

=== Mittelrhein ===
==== League table ====
Pos	Team	Pld	W	D	L	GF	GA	GD	Pts	Promotion or relegation
1	FC Hennef 05 (C)	30	22	2	6	73	37	+36	68	
2	FC Wegberg-Beeck (P)	30	20	5	5	65	28	+37	65	Promotion to Regionalliga West
3	VfL 08 Vichttal	30	19	4	7	88	51	+37	61	
4	Bonner SC	30	16	7	7	70	28	+42	55	
5	Eintracht Hohkeppel	30	15	8	7	67	48	+19	53	
6	SV Bergisch Gladbach 09	30	15	8	7	53	35	+18	53	
7	SpVg Frechen	30	11	7	12	53	49	+4	40	
8	Borussia Freialdenhoven	30	10	8	12	38	52	−14	38	
9	TuS Königsdorf	30	10	4	16	49	51	−2	34	
10	FC Hürth	30	8	10	12	44	54	−10	34	
11	Viktoria Glesch-Paffendorf	30	10	3	17	53	71	−18	33	
12	Fortuna Köln II	30	7	11	12	42	53	−11	32	
13	Siegburger SV 04	30	9	5	16	39	52	−13	32	
14	Blau-Weiß Friesdorf (R)	30	8	4	18	39	88	−49	28	Relegation
15	FC Pesch (R)	30	6	8	16	34	63	−29	26	Relegation
16	Viktoria Arnoldsweiler (R)	30	4	6	20	27	74	−47	18	Relegation

Source: Soccerway
(C) Champions; (P) Promoted; (R) Relegated

=== Niederrhein ===
==== League table ====
Pos	Team	Pld	W	D	L	GF	GA	GD	Pts	Promotion or relegation
1	SSVg Velbert (C, P)	40	29	7	4	93	33	+60	94	Promotion to Regionalliga West
2	VfB 03 Hilden	40	23	10	7	89	45	+44	79	
3	TVD Velbert	40	23	9	8	86	46	+40	78	
4	Ratingen 04/19	40	22	8	10	79	55	+24	74	
5	Schwarz-Weiß Essen	40	22	7	11	84	52	+32	73	
6	KFC Uerdingen 05	40	21	9	10	80	58	+22	72	
7	SpVg Schonnebeck	40	19	4	17	84	70	+14	61	
8	TSV Meerbusch	40	16	11	13	81	67	+14	59	
9	Sportfreunde Baumberg	40	16	10	14	78	54	+24	58	
10	Hamborn 07	40	16	8	16	77	79	−2	56	
11	SC Union Nettetal	40	15	10	15	65	72	−7	55	
12	VfB Homberg	40	14	12	14	68	57	+11	54	
13	SV Sonsbeck	40	14	11	15	71	68	+3	53	
14	SC St. Tönis	40	13	14	13	59	60	−1	53	
15	1. FC Kleve	40	14	10	16	67	77	−10	52	
16	MSV Düsseldorf (R)	40	12	14	14	71	68	+3	50	Relegation
17	1. FC Monheim (R)	40	10	12	18	58	76	−18	42	Relegation
18	Cronenberger SC (R)	40	8	6	26	38	87	−49	30	Relegation
19	TuRU Düsseldorf (R)	40	7	8	25	35	85	−50	29	Relegation
20	FC Kray (R)	40	6	6	28	47	110	−63	24	Relegation
21	FSV Duisburg (R)	40	4	6	30	36	127	−91	18	Relegation

Source: Soccerway
(C) Champions; (P) Promoted; (R) Relegated

=== Niedersachsen ===
==== League table ====
Pos	Team	Pld	W	D	L	GF	GA	GD	Pts	Promotion, qualification or relegation
1	SC Spelle-Venhaus (C, P)	34	24	5	5	80	36	+44	77	Promotion to Regionalliga Nord
2	Lupo Martini Wolfsburg	34	22	8	4	69	28	+41	74	Play-off
3	Germania Egestorf/Langreder	34	20	5	9	73	40	+33	65	
4	TuS Bersenbrück	34	18	6	10	85	55	+30	60	
5	FSV Schöningen	34	16	9	9	72	54	+18	57	
6	Heeslinger SC	34	17	6	11	59	45	+14	57	
7	VfL Oldenburg	34	17	5	12	73	53	+20	56	
8	Eintracht Celle	34	14	7	13	78	75	+3	49	
9	Rotenburger SV	34	11	12	11	48	41	+7	45	
10	SV Ramlingen-Ehlershausen	34	11	11	12	59	61	−2	44	
11	SV Arminia Hannover	34	12	7	15	58	65	−7	43	
12	HSC Hannover (R)	34	11	8	15	50	72	−22	41	Relegation
13	TSV Pattensen (R)	34	12	2	20	54	76	−22	38	Relegation
14	MTV Gifhorn (R)	34	9	8	17	52	71	−19	35	Relegation
15	SV Ahlerstedt/Ottendorf (R)	34	10	5	19	51	75	−24	35	Relegation
16	Lüneburger SK Hansa (R)	34	9	5	20	37	60	−23	32	Relegation
17	FT Braunschweig (R)	34	7	5	22	41	84	−43	26	Relegation
18	SC Blau-Weiß Papenburg (R)	34	6	6	22	46	94	−48	24	Relegation

Source: Soccerway
(C) Champions; (P) Promoted; (R) Relegated

=== Nordost-Nord ===
==== League table ====
Pos	Team	Pld	W	D	L	GF	GA	GD	Pts	Promotion or relegation
1	Hansa Rostock II (C, P)	34	25	6	3	94	28	+66	81	Promotion to Regionalliga Nordost
2	Rostocker FC	34	22	3	9	77	38	+39	69	
3	TuS Makkabi Berlin	34	20	7	7	73	32	+41	67	
4	Hertha 03 Zehlendorf	34	18	8	8	71	40	+31	62	
5	RSV Eintracht Stahnsdorf	34	15	12	7	56	53	+3	57	
6	CFC Hertha 06	34	14	7	13	48	44	+4	49	
7	Blau-Weiß 90 Berlin (R)	34	14	6	14	59	60	−1	48	Withdrawal (Note: Blau-Weiß 90 Berlin and Tasmania Berlin will cooperate from the upcoming season, yet both clubs will remain independent. Blau-Weiß will withdraw voluntarily to the Berlin-Liga after the end of the season.)
8	SG Dynamo Schwerin	34	13	9	12	48	54	−6	48	
9	TSG Neustrelitz	34	13	8	13	55	54	+1	47	
10	FSV Union Fürstenwalde	34	12	11	11	48	56	−8	47	
11	Eintracht Mahlsdorf	34	11	13	10	48	52	−4	46	
12	SV Tasmania Berlin	34	11	6	17	45	61	−16	39	
13	FSV Optik Rathenow	34	9	7	18	42	60	−18	34	
14	SC Staaken	34	8	9	17	46	61	−15	33	
15	MSV Neuruppin (Q)	34	7	11	16	43	57	−14	32	Relegation play-offs
16	1. FC Frankfurt (R)	34	9	4	21	43	72	−29	31	Relegation
17	MSV Pampow (R)	34	7	9	18	51	83	−32	30	Relegation
18	FC Mecklenburg Schwerin (R)	34	8	4	22	47	89	−42	28	Relegation

Source: Soccerway
(C) Champions; (P) Promoted; (Q) Qualified for the phase indicated; (R) Relegated

=== Nordost-Süd ===
==== League table ====
Pos	Team	Pld	W	D	L	GF	GA	GD	Pts	Promotion or relegation
1	FC Eilenburg (C, P)	34	22	5	7	65	33	+32	71	Promotion to Regionalliga Nordost
2	VfB Krieschow	34	20	5	9	81	53	+28	65	
3	Bischofswerdaer FV 08	34	17	8	9	69	36	+33	59	
4	VFC Plauen	34	16	9	9	82	47	+35	57	
5	FSV Budissa Bautzen	34	16	6	12	66	55	+11	54	
6	VfB Auerbach	34	12	14	8	55	42	+13	50	
7	SC Freital	34	14	8	12	49	42	+7	50	
8	SG Union Sandersdorf	34	13	10	11	37	43	−6	49	
9	FC Einheit Wernigerode	34	13	9	12	66	66	0	48	
10	Einheit Rudolstadt	34	12	11	11	50	53	−3	47	
11	VfL Halle 1896	34	12	8	14	45	49	−4	44	
12	Ludwigsfelder FC	34	11	10	13	35	38	−3	43	
13	FC Grimma	34	10	12	12	41	46	−5	42	
14	FC An der Fahner Höhe (Q)	34	12	5	17	50	67	−17	41	Relegation play-offs
15	Wacker Nordhausen (R)	34	10	6	18	42	65	−23	36	Relegation
16	SV Blau-Weiß Zorbau (R)	34	7	10	17	58	77	−19	31	Relegation
17	SV 1890 Westerhausen (R)	34	6	10	18	44	84	−40	28	Relegation
18	FC Oberlausitz Neugersdorf (R)	34	4	12	18	27	66	−39	24	Relegation

Source: Soccerway
(C) Champions; (P) Promoted; (Q) Qualified for the phase indicated; (R) Relegated

=== Rheinland-Pfalz/Saar ===
==== Nord ====
Pos	Team	Pld	W	D	L	GF	GA	GD	Pts	Qualification
1	TSV Schott Mainz	20	14	4	2	58	17	+41	46	Promotion round
2	TuS Koblenz	20	14	4	2	42	13	+29	46	Promotion round
3	FV Engers 07	20	13	5	2	45	19	+26	44	Promotion round
4	SV Gonsenheim	20	12	5	3	47	23	+24	41	Promotion round
5	FC Karbach	20	7	7	6	38	31	+7	28	Promotion round
6	TSG Pfeddersheim	20	7	2	11	35	35	0	23	Relegation round
7	TuS Kirchberg	20	5	2	13	26	59	−33	17	Relegation round
8	Ahrweiler BC	20	4	4	12	22	42	−20	16	Relegation round
9	SG 2000 Mülheim-Kärlich	20	4	4	12	22	44	−22	16	Relegation round
10	Alemannia Waldalgesheim	20	4	4	12	23	46	−23	16	Relegation round
11	Eisbachtaler Sportfreunde	20	4	3	13	29	58	−29	15	Relegation round

Source: Soccerway

==== Süd ====
Pos	Team	Pld	W	D	L	GF	GA	GD	Pts	Qualification
1	FK Pirmasens	20	12	4	4	47	21	+26	40	Promotion round
2	1. FC Kaiserslautern II	20	12	3	5	46	21	+25	39	Promotion round
3	TuS Mechtersheim	20	12	3	5	44	25	+19	39	Promotion round
4	FV 07 Diefflen	20	11	3	6	49	33	+16	36	Promotion round
5	SV Auersmacher	20	10	4	6	44	29	+15	34	Promotion round
6	Arminia Ludwigshafen	20	10	4	6	33	35	−2	34	Relegation round
7	SV Morlautern	20	6	3	11	31	45	−14	21	Relegation round
8	FSV Jägersburg	20	5	5	10	29	49	−20	20	Relegation round
9	Hertha Wiesbach	20	4	7	9	29	45	−16	19	Relegation round
10	FV Dudenhofen	20	5	3	12	29	38	−9	18	Relegation round
11	SV Elversberg II	20	2	3	15	19	59	−40	9	Relegation round

Source: Soccerway

==== Promotion round ====
Each club only played against teams whom it has not yet played in the group phase.
Results achieved in the group stage were fully taken over.

Pos	Team	Pld	W	D	L	GF	GA	GD	Pts	Promotion or qualification
1	TSV Schott Mainz (C, P)	30	21	7	2	90	28	+62	70	Promotion to Regionalliga Südwest
2	TuS Koblenz (O, P)	30	21	6	3	59	20	+39	69	Play-off
3	FK Pirmasens	30	19	5	6	66	34	+32	62	
4	SV Gonsenheim	30	15	8	7	70	38	+32	53	
5	FV Engers 07	30	15	7	8	57	36	+21	52	
6	TuS Mechtersheim	26	10	6	10	55	46	+9	36	
7	1. FC Kaiserslautern II	30	13	7	10	58	43	+15	46	
8	FV 07 Diefflen	30	14	4	12	60	63	−3	46	
9	FC Karbach	30	12	8	10	63	47	+16	44	
10	SV Auersmacher	30	12	6	12	57	52	+5	42	

Source: kicker
(C) Champions; (O) Play-off winners; (P) Promoted

==== Relegation round ====
Each club only played against teams whom it has not yet played in the group phase.
Results achieved in the group stage were fully taken over.

Pos	Team	Pld	W	D	L	GF	GA	GD	Pts	Relegation
11	Arminia Ludwigshafen	32	15	8	9	63	62	+1	53	
12	TSG Pfeddersheim	32	13	6	13	60	50	+10	45	
13	FV Dudenhofen	32	13	6	13	50	44	+6	45	
14	SV Morlautern	32	13	5	14	65	60	+5	44	
15	Alemannia Waldalgesheim	32	12	8	12	48	59	−11	44	
16	Hertha Wiesbach (R)	32	11	10	11	61	59	+2	43	Relegation
17	FSV Jägersburg (R)	32	9	10	13	56	67	−11	37	Relegation
18	Ahrweiler BC (R)	32	6	7	19	34	77	−43	25	Relegation
19	TuS Kirchberg (R)	32	7	4	21	44	89	−45	25	Relegation
20	Eisbachtaler Sportfreunde (R)	32	6	4	22	50	89	−39	22	Relegation
21	SG 2000 Mülheim-Kärlich (R)	32	4	8	20	32	78	−46	20	Relegation
22	SV Elversberg II (R)	32	5	4	23	33	90	−57	19	Relegation

Source: kicker
(R) Relegated

=== Schleswig-Holstein ===
==== League table ====
Pos	Team	Pld	W	D	L	GF	GA	GD	Pts	Qualification or relegation
1	FC Kilia Kiel (O, P)	32	26	3	3	125	25	+100	81	Play-off
2	SV Eichede	32	23	6	3	63	23	+40	75	
3	SV Todesfelde	32	23	4	5	112	34	+78	73	
4	Union Neumünster	32	20	6	6	111	39	+72	66	
5	TSB Flensburg	32	19	4	9	75	46	+29	60 (Note: TSB Flensburg were deducted 1 point for not meeting the referee quota.)	
6	Heider SV	32	18	1	13	78	68	+10	55	
7	Eckernförder SV	32	15	3	14	59	58	+1	48	
8	VfB Lübeck II	32	14	4	14	77	86	−9	46	
9	Inter Türkspor Kiel	32	12	7	13	78	76	+2	43	
10	TSV Bordesholm	32	10	7	15	55	67	−12	37	
11	Oldenburger SV	32	11	4	17	51	68	−17	37	
12	Weiche Flensburg 08 II	32	9	3	20	51	76	−25	30	
13	FC Dornbreite	32	7	6	19	32	85	−53	27	
14	SV Frisia 03 Risum-Lindholm (R)	32	7	3	22	33	94	−61	24	Relegation
15	TSV Pansdorf (R)	32	6	5	21	42	96	−54	23	Relegation
16	Husumer SV (R)	32	6	5	21	41	95	−54	23	Relegation
17	SV Grün-Weiß Siebenbäumen (R)	32	6	9	17	37	84	−47	21 (Note: SV Grun-Weiß Siebenbäumen were deducted 6 points for not meeting the referee quota.)	Relegation

Source: Soccerway
(O) Play-off winners; (P) Promoted; (R) Relegated

=== Westfalen ===
==== League table ====
Pos	Team	Pld	W	D	L	GF	GA	GD	Pts	Promotion, qualification or relegation
1	FC Gütersloh (C, P)	34	23	3	8	67	38	+29	72	Promotion to Regionalliga West
2	Preußen Münster II	34	18	11	5	82	46	+36	65	Ineligible for promotion (Note: Reserve teams are only eligible for promotion if the respective first team plays at the lowest in the 2. Bundesliga.)
3	SC Paderborn 07 II (P)	34	18	10	6	53	23	+30	64	Promotion to Regionalliga West
4	Sportfreunde Lotte	34	18	6	10	64	43	+21	60	
5	TuS Bövinghausen	34	15	8	11	73	59	+14	53	
6	SV Westfalia Rhynern	34	14	10	10	52	48	+4	52	
7	ASC 09 Dortmund	34	14	7	13	51	55	−4	49	
8	TSV Victoria Clarholz	34	13	9	12	53	48	+5	48	
9	SG Finnentrop/Bamenohl	34	14	5	15	66	56	+10	47	
10	FC Eintracht Rheine	34	13	7	14	52	60	−8	46	
11	SpVgg Vreden	34	11	10	13	59	67	−8	43	
12	SV Schermbeck	34	10	9	15	43	56	−13	39	
13	1. FC Gievenbeck	34	9	9	16	48	50	−2	36	
14	Sportfreunde Siegen	34	9	8	17	50	54	−4	35	
15	TSG Sprockhövel	34	8	11	15	48	69	−21	35	
16	TuS Ennepetal	34	9	8	17	32	59	−27	35	
17	TuS Erndtebrück (R)	34	9	7	18	47	85	−38	34	Relegation
18	Delbrücker SC (R)	34	8	8	18	47	71	−24	32	Relegation

Source: Soccerway
(C) Champions; (P) Promoted; (R) Relegated
