= Kei Hirose =

Japanese footballer (born 1995)

Personal information
- Date of birth: 20 November 1995 (age 30)
- Place of birth: Tokyo, Japan
- Height: 1.72 m (5 ft 8 in)
- Position: Midfielder

Team information
- Current team: Java United
- Number: 8

Youth career
- 2011–2013: Maebashi Ikuei High School

College career
Years	Team	Apps	(Gls)
2014–2015	Senshu University		

Senior career*
Years	Team	Apps	(Gls)
2015–2016	VfR Fischeln	13	(1)
2016	VfR Fischeln II	2	(1)
2016–2017	Kray	1	(0)
2017–2018	Jahn Hiesfeld II	2	(0)
2017–2018	Jahn Hiesfeld	27	(2)
2018	Lija Athletic	12	(0)
2018–2019	Mosta	10	(0)
2019–2020	Persela Lamongan	34	(2)
2020–2021	Johor Darul Ta'zim II	28	(2)
2021–2026	Borneo Samarinda	136	(3)
2026–	Java United	3	(0)
- * Club domestic league appearances and goals as of 23:30 19 September 2026 (UTC)

Kei Hirose (廣瀬 慧, Hirose Kei; born 20 November 1995) is a Japanese professional footballer who plays as a midfielder for Super League club Java United.

== Career statistics ==
As of 19 September 2026

Club	Season	League			Cup		Other		Total	
Club	Season	Division	Apps	Goals	Apps	Goals	Apps	Goals	Apps	Goals
VfR Fischeln	2015–16	Oberliga Niederrhein	13	1	0	0	0	0	13	1
VfR Fischeln II	2015–16	Kreisliga	2	1	–		0	0	2	1
Kray	2016–17	Oberliga Niederrhein	1	0	0	0	0	0	1	0
Jahn Hiesfeld II	2016–17	Kreisliga	1	0	–		0	0	1	0
Jahn Hiesfeld II	2017–18	Kreisliga	1	0	–		0	0	1	0
Jahn Hiesfeld II	Total		2	0	0	0	0	0	2	0
Jahn Hiesfeld	2016–17	Oberliga Niederrhein	11	0	0	0	0	0	11	0
Jahn Hiesfeld	2017–18	Oberliga Niederrhein	16	2	0	0	0	0	16	2
Jahn Hiesfeld	Total		27	2	0	0	0	0	27	2
Lija Athletic	2017–18	Maltese Premier League	12	0	2 (Note: Appearances in the FA Trophy)	0	0	0	14	0
Mosta	2018–19	Maltese Premier League	10	0	0	0	0	0	10	0
Persela	2019	Liga 1	34	2	0	0	4 (Note: Appearances in the Indonesia President's Cup)	1	38	3
Johor Darul Ta'zim II	2020	Malaysia Premier League	8	0	0	0	0	0	8	0
Johor Darul Ta'zim II	2021	Malaysia Premier League	20	2	0	0	0	0	20	2
Johor Darul Ta'zim II	Total		28	2	0	0	0	0	28	2
Borneo Samarinda	2021–22	Liga 1	13	1	0	0	0	0	13	1
Borneo Samarinda	2022–23	Liga 1	22	0	0	0	9	0	31	0
Borneo Samarinda	2023–24	Liga 1	36	0	0	0	0	0	36	0
Borneo Samarinda	2024–25	Liga 1	31	1	0	0	5 (Note: Appearances in ASEAN Club Championship)	0	36	1
Borneo Samarinda	2025–26	Super League	34	1	0	0	0	0	34	1
Borneo Samarinda	Total		136	3	0	0	5	0	141	3
Java United	2026–27	Super League	3	0	0	0	0	0	3	0
Career total			262	9	2	0	18	1	282	10

== Honours ==
Borneo Samarinda

- Piala Presiden runner-up: 2022, 2024
