= Kohei Nakano =

Japanese footballer

Personal information
- Date of birth: 28 April 2003 (age 23)
- Place of birth: Osaka, Japan
- Height: 1.72 m (5 ft 8 in)
- Position: Midfielder

Team information
- Current team: SC St. Tönis 11/20

Youth career
- –2020: Cerezo Osaka

Senior career*
Years	Team	Apps	(Gls)
2020–2022	Cerezo Osaka U-23	1	(0)
2022	1. FC Bocholt	6	(1)
2023	TuRU Düsseldorf	19	(0)
2023	TVD Velbert	2	(0)
2024–	SC St. Tönis 11/20	15	(2)
- * Club domestic league appearances and goals as of 2 June 2024

Kohei Nakano (中埜 航平, Nakano Kohei; born 28 April 2003) is a Japanese footballer who plays as a midfielder for German Oberliga Niederrhein club SC St. Tönis 11/20.

== Career statistics ==
=== Club ===
As of 21 November 2020.

Club	Season	League			National Cup		League Cup		Other		Total	
Club	Season	Division	Apps	Goals	Apps	Goals	Apps	Goals	Apps	Goals	Apps	Goals
Cerezo Osaka U-23	2020	J3 League	1	0	–		–		0	0	1	0
Career total			1	0	0	0	0	0	0	0	1	0
