= 2015–16 Oberliga Niederrhein =

Oberliga Niederrhein
- Season: 2015–16
- Champions: Wuppertaler SV
- Relegated: MSV Duisburg II: 1. FC Mönchengladbach; RW Oberhausen II TV Kalkum-Wittlaer
- Matches: 306
- Top goalscorer: Philipp Goris (20 goals)
- Total attendance: 136,769
- Average attendance: 450

The 2015–16 Oberliga Niederrhein was the 60th season of the Oberliga Niederrhein, one of three state association league systems in the state of North Rhine-Westphalia, covering its northwestern part. It was the fourth season of the league as a fifth level of the German football league system.

== League table ==
The league featured five new clubs for the 2015–16 season with TV Kalkum-Wittlaer, 1. FC Mönchengladbach, SpVg Schonnebeck and SC Düsseldorf-West promoted from the Landesliga Niederrhein while KFC Uerdingen 05 had been relegated from the Regionalliga West.

Pos	Team	Pld	W	D	L	GF	GA	GD	Pts	Promotion or relegation
1	Wuppertaler SV (C, P)	34	23	5	6	69	25	+44	74	Promotion to Regionalliga West
2	KFC Uerdingen 05	34	18	8	8	59	38	+21	62	
3	TV Jahn Hiesfeld	34	17	7	10	70	48	+22	58	
4	TuRU Düsseldorf	34	14	10	10	46	40	+6	52	
5	SpVg Schonnebeck	34	13	11	10	52	48	+4	50	
6	VfR Fischeln	34	13	10	11	66	64	+2	49	
7	SC Kapellen-Erft	34	12	12	10	55	51	+4	48	
8	TSV Meerbusch	34	12	12	10	54	58	−4	48	
9	SC Düsseldorf-West	34	13	8	13	43	50	−7	47	
10	SV Hönnepel-Niedermörmter	34	12	10	12	56	48	+8	46	
11	Ratinger SV	34	10	15	9	47	46	+1	45	
12	1. FC Bocholt	34	13	6	15	52	52	0	45	
13	MSV Duisburg II (Note: MSV Duisburg II withdrawn from competition at the end of season.)	34	11	10	13	50	42	+8	43	Withdrawn from competition
14	VfB 03 Hilden	34	11	8	15	48	58	−10	41	
15	Schwarz-Weiß Essen	34	11	7	16	51	62	−11	40	
16	1. FC Mönchengladbach (R)	34	8	9	17	41	67	−26	33	Relegation to Landesliga Niederrhein
17	Rot-Weiß Oberhausen II (R)	34	8	7	19	43	72	−29	31	Relegation to Landesliga Niederrhein
18	TV Kalkum-Wittlaer (R)	34	5	9	20	36	69	−33	24	Relegation to Landesliga Niederrhein

Source: kicker.de, soccerway.com
Rules for classification: 1) Points; 2) Goal difference; 3) Goals scored
(C) Champions; (P) Promoted; (R) Relegated

== Top goalscorers ==
The top goal scorers:

Rank	Player	Club	Goals
1	(Germany) Philipp Goris	1. FC Bocholt	20
2	(Germany) Danny Rankl	KFC Uerdingen 05; TV Jahn Hiesfeld	19
3	(Germany) Chamdin Said	Schwarz-Weiß Essen	16
3	(Germany) Alexander Lipinski	VfR Fischeln	16
5	(Germany) Kevin Weggen	MSV Duisburg II	14
5	(Turkey) Ercan Aydogmus	Wuppertaler SV	14
5	(Germany) Andre Trienenjost	SV Hönnepel-Niedermörmter	14
5	(Germany) Boran Sezen	Rot-Weiß Oberhausen II	14
9	(Japan) Keisuke Ota	SC Kapellen-Erft	13
10	(Germany) Stefan Schaumburg	VfB 03 Hilden	12
10	(Germany) Kevin Breuer	VfR Fischeln	12

== Promotion play-off ==
The runners-up of the two divisions of the Landesliga Niederrhein compete for one more spot in the Oberliga.

Team 1	Agg.	Team 2	1st leg	2nd leg
1. FC Kleve	1–4	Cronenberger SC	1–0	0–4
