= Kelvin Lunga =

Zimbabwean footballer (born 1994)

Personal information
- Date of birth: 11 May 1994 (age 32)
- Place of birth: Germany
- Height: 1.87 m (6 ft 2 in)
- Positions: Winger; striker

Team information
- Current team: 1. FC Bocholt
- Number: 14

Senior career*
| Years | Team | Apps | (Gls) |
| 2012–2014 | TSV Germania Windeck | 35 | (10) |
| 2014–2015 | Bonner SC | 26 | (13) |
| 2015–2016 | 1. FC Köln II | 6 | (1) |
| 2016–2017 | Bonner SC | 23 | (6) |
| 2017–2019 | SV Rödinghausen | 45 | (8) |
| 2019–2020 | SC Fortuna Köln | 12 | (0) |
| 2021 | SV Bergisch Gladbach 09 | 14 | (1) |
| 2021–2022 | SV Straelen | 37 | (5) |
| 2022–2023 | Rot-Weiß Oberhausen | 27 | (4) |
| 2023– | 1. FC Bocholt | 27 | (0) |
- * Club domestic league appearances and goals as of 1 January 2025

Kelvin Lunga (born 11 May 1994) is a footballer who plays as a winger or striker for 1. FC Bocholt. Born in Germany, he has been called up to represent Zimbabwe internationally.

== Early life ==
Lunga grew up competing in running competitions.

== Club career ==
In 2022, he signed for German side Rot-Weiß Oberhausen. He was described as "played a big part... one of the best in Mike Terranova's team".

== International career ==
Lunga has been called up to represent Zimbabwe internationally.

== Style of play ==
Lunga has been described as a "skilful right winger with an eye for the goal... who can play wide in midfield or as a striker". He is known for his strength and speed.

== Personal life ==
Lunga is the son of Zimbabwe international Max Lunga. He is a native of Bonn, Germany.
