= Niklas Bolten =

German footballer

Personal information
- Full name: Niklas Bolten
- Date of birth: 29 March 1994 (age 32)
- Place of birth: Düsseldorf, Germany
- Height: 1.95 m (6 ft 5 in)
- Position: Goalkeeper

Youth career
- –2003: ASV Lank
- 2003–2013: Borussia Mönchengladbach

Senior career*
Years	Team	Apps	(Gls)
2013–2015	Borussia Mönchengladbach II	2	(0)
2015–2017	VfB Stuttgart II	23	(0)
- * Club domestic league appearances and goals as of 16:43, 25 September 2017 (UTC)

Niklas Bolten (born 29 March 1994) is a German footballer who plays as a goalkeeper.
