= Jung Yeon-woong =

South Korean footballer

Personal information
- Date of birth: 31 August 1992 (age 34)
- Place of birth: South Korea
- Position: Midfielder

Team information
- Current team: TuRU Düsseldorf

Senior career*
Years	Team	Apps	(Gls)
- Jacareí
2011–2013	Daejeon Hana Citizen	1	(0)
2012	→ V-Varen Nagasaki (loan)		
2014–2015	KSV Hessen Kassel	15	(0)
2018	Winner Star		
2019	Hilal Bergheim		
2020	VSF Amern		
	Siegburger SV 04	5	(1)
2021–	TuRU Düsseldorf	2	(0)
- * Club domestic league appearances and goals

Jung Yeon-woong (Korean: 정연웅; born 31 August 1992) is a South Korean professional footballer who plays as a midfielder for TuRU Düsseldorf.

== Career ==
At the age of 17, Jung signed for Brazilian side Jacareí. Before the 2011 season, he signed for Daejeon Hana Citizen in the South Korean top flight, where he made 1 appearance and scored 0 goals. On 11 May 2011, Jung debuted for Daejeon Hana Citizen during a 1–1 draw with Daegu FC. Before the 2012 season, he was sent on loan to Japanese fourth division club V-Varen Nagasaki, where he suffered injuries and said, "I'm a foreign player in Japan, but because I couldn't go to the game, they gave me a headache. At that time, I learned how to live fiercely."

Before the second half of 2013–13, Jung signed for KSV Hessen Kassel in the German fourth division. In 2018, he signed for South Korean sixth division team Winner Star. Before the second half of 2018–19, he signed for Hilal Bergheim in the German sixth division. In 2020, Jung signed for German fifth division outfit Siegburger SV 04.
