= Dominik Lanius =

German footballer

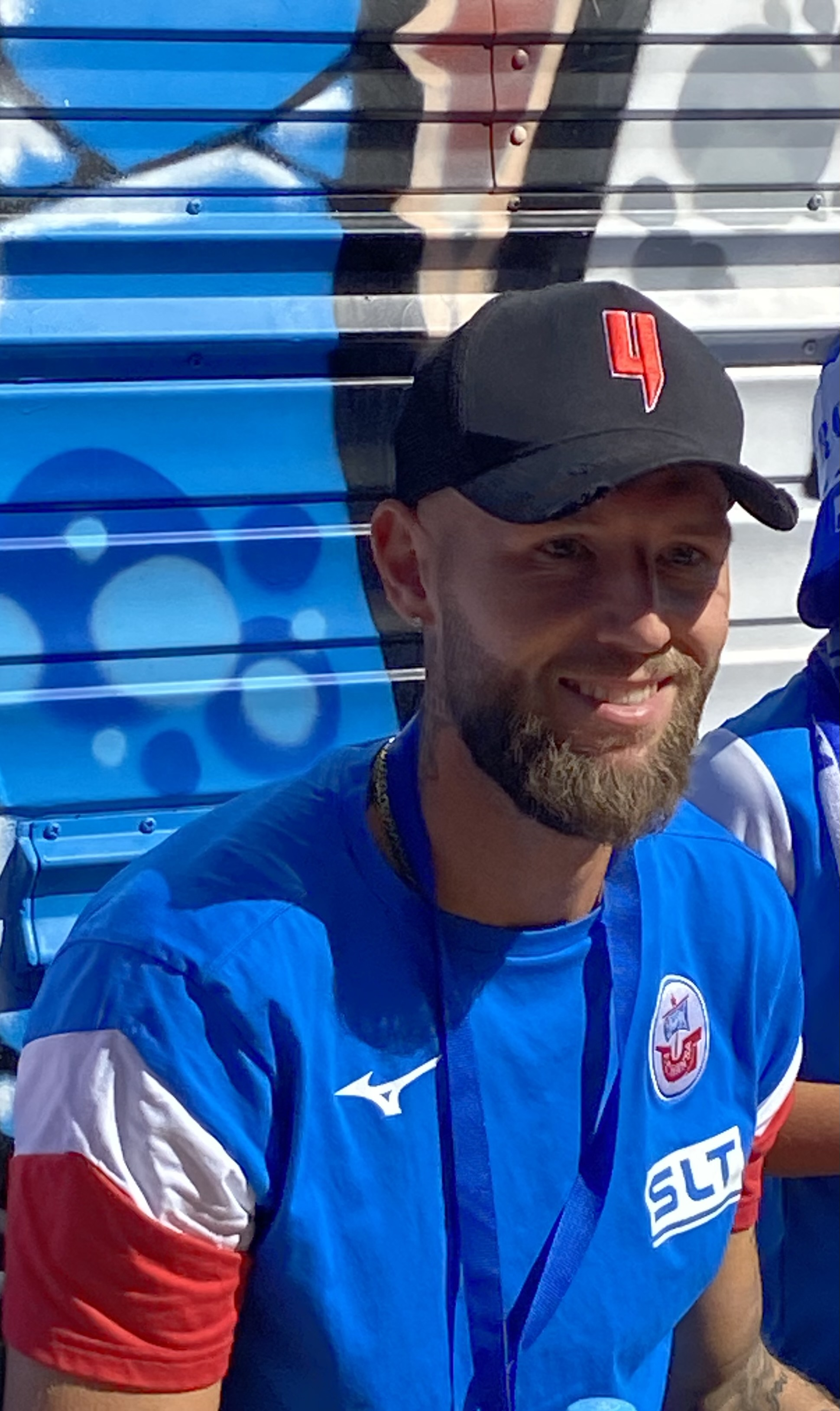
- Lanius in 2025

Personal information
- Date of birth: 28 March 1997 (age 29)
- Place of birth: Cologne, Germany
- Height: 1.95 m (6 ft 5 in)
- Position: Defender

Team information
- Current team: 1. FC Bocholt
- Number: 13

Youth career
- –2010: SV Deutz 05
- 2010–2016: Viktoria Köln

Senior career*
Years	Team	Apps	(Gls)
2015–2018	Viktoria Köln	54	(5)
2018	Viktoria Köln II	2	(0)
2018–2019	Preußen Münster	3	(0)
2018–2019	Preußen Münster II	3	(0)
2019–2021	Viktoria Köln	30	(1)
2021–2024	Fortuna Köln	95	(14)
2024–2026	Hansa Rostock	0	(0)
2025	Hansa Rostock II	2	(0)
2026–	1. FC Bocholt	14	(0)
- * Club domestic league appearances and goals as of 23 September 2026

Dominik Lanius (born 28 March 1997) is a German professional footballer who plays as a defender for Regionalliga West club 1. FC Bocholt.

== Club career ==
On 23 May 2019, FC Viktoria Köln confirmed, that they had re-signed Lanius on a one-year contract for the 2019–20 season.

On 17 July 2024, Lanius signed with Hansa Rostock in 3. Liga.
