= Lower Rhine Cup =

- Founded: 1980
- Region: Lower Rhine, North Rhine-Westphalia, Germany
- Qualifier for: DFB-Pokal
- Current champions: MSV Duisburg (2025–26)
- Most championships: Rot-Weiss Essen (12 titles)

The Lower Rhine Cup (German: Niederrheinpokal) is a German football club Cup competition open to teams from the Lower Rhine region of the state of North Rhine-Westphalia. The competition is one of the 21 regional cup competitions of German football and acts as a qualifier for the following seasons' German Cup.

The competition is sponsored by the Diebels brewery and carries the official name Diebels Niederrheinpokal. It is operated by the Lower Rhine Football Association, the FVN.

== Modus ==
Clubs from fully professional leagues are not permitted to enter the competition, meaning, no teams from the Fußball-Bundesliga and the 2nd Bundesliga can compete.

All clubs from the Lower Rhine playing in the 3. Liga (III), Regionalliga West (IV) and Oberliga Niederrhein (V) are directly qualified for the first round, the remaining places in the first round are filled with the teams who qualified from local cup competitions, the Kreispokale.

Since the establishment of the 3. Liga in 2008, reserve teams can not take part in the German Cup or the Lower Rhine Cup anymore.

== Winners ==
The past winners of the competition:

Club	Wins	Years
Rot-Weiss Essen	12	1995, 2002, 2004, 2008, 2011, 2012, 2015, 2016, 2020, 2023, 2024, 2025
Wuppertaler SV	7	1981, 1985, 1999, 2000, 2005, 2007, 2021
MSV Duisburg	4	1989, 2014, 2017, 2026
FC Remscheid	3	1990, 1991, 1994
Rot-Weiß Oberhausen	3	1996, 1998, 2018
Schwarz-Weiß Essen	2	1987, 2010
SSVg. Velbert	2	2003, 2006
KFC Uerdingen 05	2	2001, 2019
Sportfreunde Baumberg	1	2013
VfB Speldorf	1	2009
Borussia Mönchengladbach Amateure	1	1997
SV Viktoria Goch	1	1986
1. FC Bocholt	1	1983
Bayer 05 Uerdingen Amateure	1	1982
SV Straelen	1	2022

- No cup held or winner known for 1984, 1988, 1992 and 1993. In 1992 Wuppertaler SV und Fortuna Düsseldorf Amateure both qualified for the first round of the German Cup through the Lower Rhine Cup.
