= Landesliga Niederrhein =

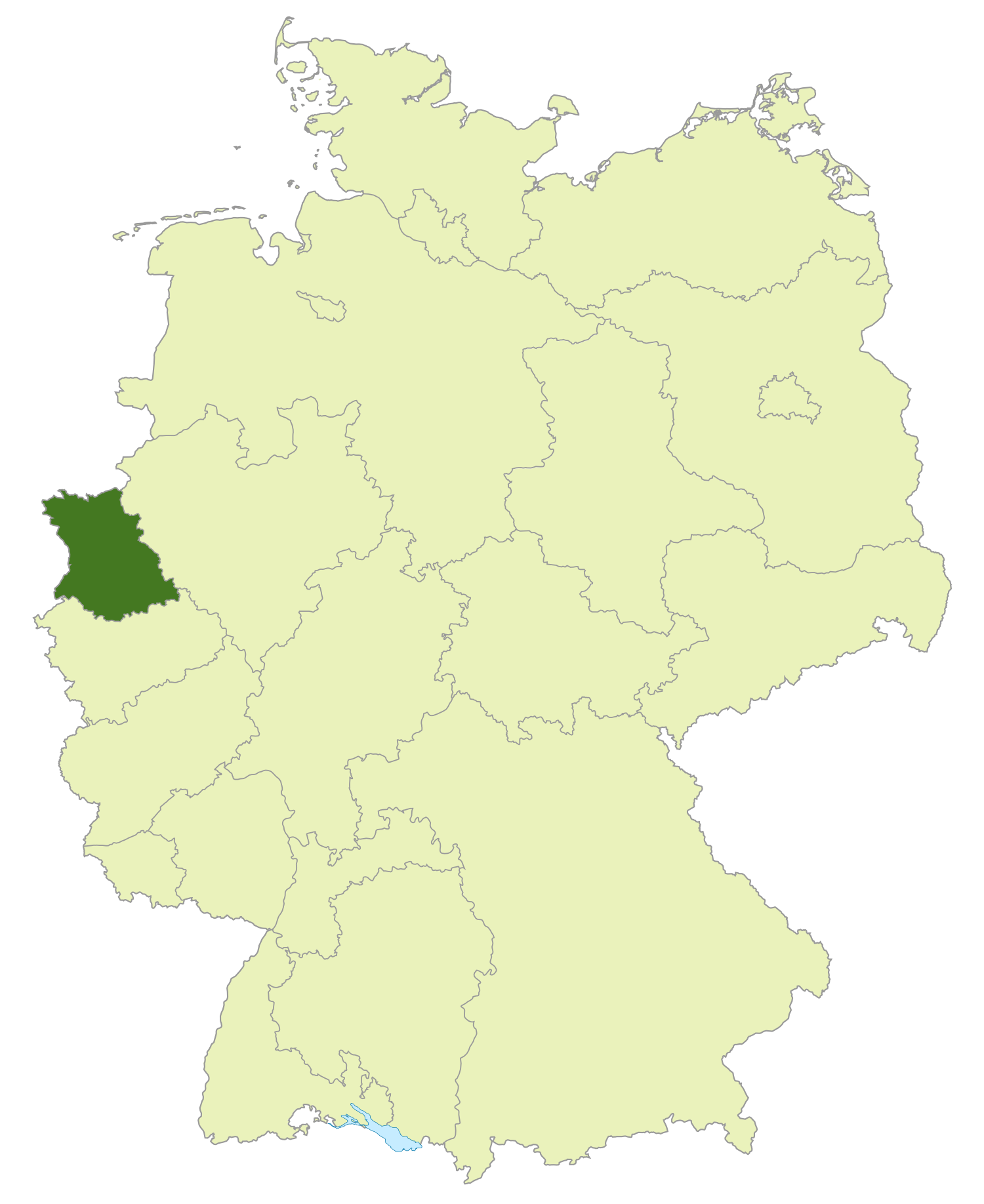
- Organising body: Lower Rhine Football Association
- Founded: 1947
- Country: Germany
- State: North Rhine-Westphalia
- Region: Lower Rhine
- Divisions: 3
- Number of clubs: 43
- Level on pyramid: Level 6
- Promotion to: Oberliga Niederrhein
- Relegation to: Bezirksliga Niederrhein (6 divisions)
- Current champions: Group 1: MSV Düsseldorf; Group 2: SV Sonsbeck; Group 3: Hamborn 07 (2021–22)

The Landesliga Niederrhein is the second highest amateur football league in the Lower Rhine region which is part of the state of North Rhine-Westphalia and since 2012 the sixth tier of the German football league system. It operates in two groups which run parallel below the Oberliga Niederrhein. Until the introduction of the 3. Liga in 2008 it was the sixth tier of the league system; until the introduction of the Regionalligas in 1994 the fifth tier.

== History ==
The league was founded in 1947 as the highest division for the area covered by the Lower Rhine football association. In 1949 it became a second tier to the 2. Oberliga West and was reduced to two divisions until 1952, when the three-division system was restored. In 1956 it dropped to the third tier after Verbandsliga Niederrhein was founded. The league still remained as feeder to the Verbandsliga with the replacement of the 2. Oberliga West by the old Regionalliga West in 1963. In turn the Regionalliga was replaced by 2. Bundesliga Nord in 1974. In 1978 it was slipped to the fourth tier under Oberliga Nordrhein; in 1994 it was the fifth under the current Regionalliga West, and in 2008 was the sixth under the NRW-Liga which took over after Oberliga was abolished.

In the German football league system, the Landesliga was first established as second-rate below the Oberliga West and it later slipped five times down to the seventh level by the introduction of the aforementioned higher leagues. Since the league structural reform of 2012 and the related dissolution of the NRW-Liga in favor of the Oberliga Niederrhein, however, the league moved up from the seventh to the sixth level.

== Modus ==
For five seasons since 2015-16, the Landesliga Niederrhein has consisted of two groups of 16 to 18 clubs each. The exact number of teams is carried out every year on a geographical basis.

The champions of each group are promoted to the Oberliga Niederrhein, provided they are senior clubs or are financially efficient. Should a winner or both winners be deemed ineligible (if reserve teams) or refuse promotion for any reason, the next best-placed teams in their groups may be promoted. The runner-up in each group may playoff for promotion. The number of promotions to the Oberliga depend on the number of relegations and promotions in that league. Teams ranked 16th and below are relegated to their respective Bezirksliga and are replaced by the champions from each Bezirksliga. In the two groups, the 15th placed teams play each other for relegation. A reserve team is also relegated if its senior team drops down to the Landesliga.

For 2020–21, the Landesliga expanded to 43 clubs and reverted to three groups of 14 to 15 teams each due to the cancellation of the preceding season.

== League champions ==
The league champions of the divisions:

Season	Division		
Season	1	2	3
1948	TuRa Essen	VfB Hilden	Duisburger SV
1949	Duisburger FV 08	VfL 06 Benrath (Note: Promoted to 2. Oberliga West.)	Duisburger SV
1950	Cronenberger SC	VfB Lohberg	In two divisions
1951	Cronenberger SC	VfB Bottrop	In two divisions
1952	Cronenberger SC	Elmar Alstaden	In two divisions
1953	SpVgg Gräfath	Homberger SV	1. FC Mülheim
1954	VfL 06 Benrath	TuS Duisburg 48/99	SpVgg Sterkrade
1955	Marathon Remscheid	Homberger SV	SpVgg Sterkrade
1956	TSV Eller 04	Duisburger FV 08	VfB Speldorf
1957	SV Byfang	SV Neukirchen	Cronenberger SC
1958	SV Hamborn 90	SC Somborn	Sportfreunde Katernberg
1959	VfB Lohberg	1. FC Bocholt	Düsseldorfer SC
1960	BV Altenessen	VfB Kleve	Fortuna Düsseldorf A
1961	TSG Karnap	SC Kleve	VfR Neuss
1962	Duisburger FV 08	SV Sterkrade-Nord	Union Ohligs
1963	Sportfreunde Walsum	Bayer Uerdingen	SSVg Velbert
1964	Düsseldorfer SC	VfB Ruhrort	Schwarz-Weiß Alstaden
1965	Viktoria Wuppertal	MSV Duisburg A	BV Osterfeld
1966	Marathon Remscheid	Duisburger FV 08	SV Sterkrade-Nord
1967	VfL Wuppertal	Hülser FC	BV Altenessen
1968	TuRa Büderich	MSV Duisburg A	SV Sterkrade-Nord
1969	Union Ohligs	SC Kleve	VfB Speldorf
1970	SV Gräfrath	SV Neukirchen	Olympia Bocholt
1971	1. FC Mülheim	Fortuna Düsseldorf A	VfB Homberg
1972	Schwarz-Weiß Essen A	1. FC Viersen	VfB Bottrop
1973	Essener FV	TuS Grevenbroich	Olympia Bocholt
1974	SV Langenberg	Düsseldorfer SC	1. FC Bocholt
1975	BV Altenessen	1. FC Viersen	RSV Meerbeck
1976	Sportfreunde Katernberg	TuS Grevenbroich	TuS Xanten
1977	ASV Wuppertal	VfB Hilden	Gelria Geldern
1978	TSV Aufderhöhe	Bayer Uerdingen A	VfL Rhede
1979	1. FC Mülheim	BV 04 Düsseldorf	Viktoria Goch
1980	Borussia Monchengladbach A	VfB Speldorf	MSV Moers
1981	1. FC Wülfrath	VfB Homberg	VfB Langenfeld
1982	Duisburger FV 08	SC Kleve	SV Wermelskirchen
1983	Düsseldorfer SC 99	SV Straelen	TuS Helene Essen
1984	SV Schonnebeck	TuS Grevenbroich	VfB Bottrop
1985	VfB Remscheid	VfB Lohberg	SV Lintfort

Season	Division		
Season	1	2	3
1986	TV Jahn Hiesfeld	Rheydter SV	SSVg Velbert
1987	Bayer Uerdingen III	BV Altenessen	SC Schiefbahn
1988	Sportfreunde Katernberg	SV Schwafheim	TuRU Düsseldorf
1989	FC Kray	Preussen Krefeld	VfB Lohberg
1990	1. FC Wülfrath	SuS 09 Dinslaken	VfR Neuss
1991	TSV Bayer Dormagen	SC Bocholt 26	Duisburger FV 08
1992	Bayer Wuppertal	TuS Grevenbroich	MSV Duisburg A
1993	DSV 04 Düsseldorf	Olympia Bocholt	VfB Essen-Nord
1994	TuRU Düsseldorf	SV Straelen	VfB Lohberg
1995	FC Zons	VfB Kleve	Borussia Wuppertal
1996	Wuppertaler SV II	VfR Neuss	VfB Speldorf
1997	TSV Ronsdorf	Ratinger SV 04/19	Hamborn 07
1998	SV Wermelskirchen	SC Schiefbahn 08	Viktoria Goch
1999	SSVg Velbert	SV Hilden-Nord	Hülser SV
2000	FC Kray	SC Union Nettetal	TuS Union Mülheim
2001	SV Bayer Wuppertal	VfB Homberg	Viktoria Goch
2002	TuSpo Richrath	1. FC Kleve	SV Bottrop 1911
2003	Cronenberger SC	TuRU Düsseldorf	Rot-Weiß Oberhausen II
2004	1. FC Wülfrath	SC Kapellen-Erft	SV Sonsbeck
2005	FSV Kettwig	1. FC Viersen	Olympia Bocholt
2006	Rot-Weiss Essen II	Sportfreunde Baumberg	SV Hönnepel-Niedermörmter
2007	Spvg Radevormwald	SC Düsseldorf-West	GSV Moers
2008	SpVg Schonnebeck	SV Straelen II	TuRa 88 Duisburg
2009	FC Remscheid	VfR Fischeln	VfL Rhede
2010	Rot-Weiß Oberhausen II	Sportfreunde Baumberg	SV Sonsbeck
2011	FC Kray	SV Hilden-Nord	Hamborn 07
2012	Cronenberger SC	SV Uedesheim	VfR Fischeln
2013	Rot-Weiss Essen II	VfB 03 Hilden	PSV Wesel-Lackhausen
2014	VdS Nievenheim	VfR Fischeln	1. FC Bocholt
2015	TV Kalkum-Wittlaer	1. FC Mönchengladbach	SpVg Schonnebeck
2016	Sportfreunde Baumberg	VfB Homberg	In two divisions
2017	FSV Vohwinkel Wuppertal	SV Straelen	In two divisions
2018	TSV Meerbusch	1. FC Kleve	In two divisions
2019	TVD Velbert	FC Kray	In two divisions
2020	TV Jahn Hiesfeld	SpVgg Sterkrade-Nord	In two divisions
2021	Season curtailed and annulled by the COVID-19 pandemic in Germany		
2022	MSV Düsseldorf	SV Sonsbeck	Hamborn 07
