= Robin Udegbe =

German footballer

Personal information
- Date of birth: 20 March 1991 (age 35)
- Place of birth: Kiel, Germany
- Height: 1.94 m (6 ft 4 in)
- Position: Goalkeeper

Team information
- Current team: KFC Uerdingen 05
- Number: 27

Youth career
- 2007: Holstein Kiel
- 2007–2008: Fortuna Düsseldorf
- 2008–2010: Rot-Weiss Essen II

Senior career*
Years	Team	Apps	(Gls)
2010	Rot-Weiss Essen	0	(0)
2011	SC Düsseldorf-West	5	(0)
2011–2013	VVV-Venlo	1	(0)
2013–2015	KFC Uerdingen 05	60	(0)
2015–2019	Rot-Weiß Oberhausen	119	(0)
2019–2020	KFC Uerdingen 05	0	(0)
2020–2022	SV Straelen	65	(0)
2022–	KFC Uerdingen 05	55	(0)
- * Club domestic league appearances and goals as of 06:20, 4 July 2024 (UTC)

Robin Udegbe (born 20 March 1991) is a German professional footballer who plays as a goalkeeper for KFC Uerdingen 05.

== Career ==
On 20 July 2020, Udegbe was released by KFC Uerdingen 05.

== Personal life ==
He is of Nigerian descent and he expressed his wish to represent Nigeria.
