= Kino Delorge =

Belgian footballer (born 1998)

Personal information
- Full name: Kino Delorge
- Date of birth: 5 January 1998 (age 28)
- Place of birth: Hasselt, Belgium
- Height: 1.75 m (5 ft 9 in)
- Position: Right-back

Team information
- Current team: UNA Strassen
- Number: 3

Youth career
- –2017: Genk

Senior career*
Years	Team	Apps	(Gls)
2017–2018	Genk	0	(0)
2017–2018	→ Dordrecht (loan)	24	(0)
2018	Dinamo București	3	(0)
2019–2020	Lierse Kempenzonen	24	(0)
2020	K.S.V. Roeselare	0	(0)
2021–2022	SV 19 Straelen	44	(1)
2022–2023	Virton	13	(0)
2023–2026	F91 Dudelange	88	(11)
2026–	UNA Strassen	8	(2)

International career
2013	Belgium U15	3	(0)
2013–2014	Belgium U16	16	(0)
2014–2015	Belgium U17	24	(0)
2016–2017	Belgium U19	7	(0)
- * Club domestic league appearances and goals as of 21 September 2026

Kino Delorge (born 5 January 1998) is a Belgian professional footballer who plays as a right-back for UNA Strassen.

== Club career ==
Delorge made his Eerste Divisie debut for FC Dordrecht on 22 September 2017 in a game against Helmond Sport.

On 15 June 2023, Delorge moved to Luxembourgish side F91 Dudelange.

== International career ==
Delorge played for the Belgium national under-17 football team at the 2015 UEFA European Under-17 Championship and 2015 FIFA U-17 World Cup.
