= Beyhan Ametov =

Macedonian footballer

Personal information
- Date of birth: 7 November 1998 (age 28)
- Place of birth: Wuppertal, Germany
- Height: 1.79 m (5 ft 10 in)
- Position: Forward

Team information
- Current team: SSVg Velbert
- Number: 14

Youth career
- –2009: Wuppertaler SV
- 2009–2017: 1. FC Köln

Senior career*
Years	Team	Apps	(Gls)
2017–2019	Borussia Dortmund II	31	(4)
2019–2021	Wuppertaler SV	57	(13)
2021–2023	SV Meppen	27	(1)
2023–2024	Alemannia Aachen	6	(0)
2024–2025	Wuppertaler SV	10	(1)
2025–	SSVg Velbert	34	(0)

International career
2015	Macedonia U17	2	(0)
2015–2016	Macedonia U18	6	(2)
2017	Macedonia U19	1	(0)
2017	Macedonia U20	2	(0)
- * Club domestic league appearances and goals as of 27 September 2026

Beyhan Ametov (born 18 October 1998) is a professional footballer who plays as a forward for Oberliga club SSVg Velbert. Born in Germany, he has represented North Macedonia at youth level.

== Club career ==
Born in Wuppertal, Ametov played youth football for Wuppertaler SV and 1. FC Köln before starting his senior career at Borussia Dortmund II in 2017. He returned to Wuppertaler SV in July 2019 before signing for 3. Liga side SV Meppen in summer 2021.

== International career ==
Born in Germany, Ametov is of Macedonian descent. He has represented North Macedonia internationally at under-17, under-18, under-19 and under-20 levels.

== Career statistics ==
As of end of 2021–22 season

Appearances and goals by club, season and competition
Club	Season	League			DFB-Pokal		Other		Total	
Club	Season	Division	Apps	Goals	Apps	Goals	Apps	Goals	Apps	Goals
Borussia Dortmund II	2017–18	Regionalliga West	22	4	—		0	0	22	4
Borussia Dortmund II	2018–19	Regionalliga West	9	0	—		0	0	9	0
Borussia Dortmund II	Total		31	4	0	0	0	0	31	4
Wuppertaler SV	2019–20	Regionalliga West	23	3	—		0	0	23	3
Wuppertaler SV	2020–21	Regionalliga West	34	10	—		0	0	34	10
Wuppertaler SV	Total		57	13	0	0	0	0	57	13
SV Meppen	2021–22	3. Liga	26	1	1	0	0	0	27	1
Career total			114	18	1	0	0	0	115	18
