= Schwarz-Weiß Alstaden =

German football club

- Full name: Fußballvereinigung Schwarz-Weiß Alstaden 09/36 e.V.
- Founded: 1909
- Ground: Sportanlage Kuhle
- League: Kreisliga A Oberhausen-Bottrop (VIII)
- 2015–16: 13th
Home colours	Away colours

Schwarz-Weiß Alstaden is a German football club from the city of Oberhausen, North Rhine-Westphalia. The current day club recognizes as its predecessors Fußball-Club Borussia 1909 Alstaden and Verein für Rasenspiele 1936 Alstaden.

== History ==
FC was established in 1909 and merged in 1923 with Sportverein Rheinland 1919 Oberhausen to become SpVgg 09 Oberhausen-Alstaden. In 1934 this club merged with Alstader SV Elmar 1912 to form Alstader SV Elmar 09. The history of the Elmar side brought together many of the early local sides. It was created through the 1925 union of SV 1912 Alstaden and Fußballverein 1919 Alstaden (established as DJK Harald Alstaden). SV Alstaden was formed in the early 1920s out of the union of the gymnastics clubs Turnverein 1887 Alstaden and Turn- und Sportverein 1887 Alstaden.

Historical logo of Alstader SV Elmer ca. 1934–62

During World War II, the Alstaden club played as part of the combined wartime side KSG Elmar/Viktoria Oberhausen alongside SC Viktoria 09 Oberhausen. Both clubs resumed their separate identities after the war and Elmar played in the Amateurliga Niederrhein (II) where they enjoyed their greatest successes from 1949 to 1952 finishing atop that division's Staffel II in 1952 after a pair of third-place results. The team faded after that and slipped into local level competition.

The side was briefly revitalized following its 1962 merger with VfR 1936 Alstaden which played as WKG Zeche Alstaden from 1936 until 1942. The newly combined association adopted the name Fußballvereinigung Schwarz-Weiß Alstaden 09/36 and in 1964 advanced to the Amateurliga Niederrhein (III) where they played three seasons before being sent down after a 14th-place result in 1967. Today the team competes in the tier eight Kreisliga A after relegation from the Bezirksliga Niederrhein 6 in. 2015.
