= VfB Speldorf =

German football club

- Full name: Verein für Bewegungsspiele Speldorf e. V.
- Founded: 19 January 1919
- Ground: Saarner Straße
- Chairman: Klaus Wörsdörfer
- Manager: Oliver Röder
- League: Oberliga Niederrhein (V)
- 2017–18: 12th
Home colours	Away colours

VfB Speldorf is a German association football club from the city of Mülheim an der Ruhr, North Rhine-Westphalia.

== History ==
The association was formed on 19 January 1919 as the successor to pre-World War I side Sport-Club Preußen Speldorf, which was itself the successor of Ballverein Rheinland Speldorf. Later the same year the club merged with Fußball Club Rheinland Speldorf to become Verein für Bewegungsspiele Speldorf.

The team played largely as a local side and in 1933 adopted the name VfB Mülheim-Speldorf. They captured consecutive titles in the Berziksklasse Niederrhein (II) in 1935 and 1936 and took part in promotion playoffs for the Gauliga Niederrhein, but were unsuccessful in their attempt to advance. Late in World War II, VfB played as part of the wartime club Kriegspielgemeinschaft Mülheim/Broich alongside Turn- und Spielverein Broich 1885 (1943–45), before resuming its separate identity after the conflict.

From the 40s on into the mid-50s Speldorf competed in the third tier Landesliga Niederrhein as an undistinguished side until breaking out in 1956 and capturing the division title. The team then went on to national amateur final where they were beaten 2:3 by SpVgg Neu-Isenburg. They fared poorly the next season after their advance to the 2. Liga-West (II) and were immediately relegated. They spent four more seasons in the Landesliga before slipping out of sight into local competition. VfB resurfaced in the Amateurliga Niederrhein (III) in 1969 for a three-season turn before again backsliding, followed by a single season cameo appearance in the Amateuroberliga Nordrhein (III) in 1983–84. Most recently Speldorf returned to the professional ranks in the Oberliga Nordrhein (IV) in 2005.

The club currently plays in the tier five Oberliga Niederrhein after promotion from the Landesliga Niederrhein in 2017.

== Honours ==
The club's honours:

- Bezirksklasse Niederrhein (II)
  - Champions: 1934, 1935
- Landesliga Niederrhein (III)
  - Champions: 1956, 1969
- Verbandsliga Niederrhein (VI)
  - Champions: 2005, 2009
- German amateur championship
  - Runners-up: 1956
- Lower Rhine Cup
  - Winners: 2009

== Stadium ==
Home games were played at the Stadion am Blötter Weg which could accommodate of 2,500 spectators. As part of a restructuring in 2004, a small covered grandstand was built. In 2010, the stadium was torn down.

The town of Mülheim an der Ruhr and VfB Speldorf have prepared for the move of the club to the Ruhrstadion for the 2008–09 season. The new venue holds 6,000 and is better served by a well-developed urban infrastructure than is the current site. The Ruhrstadium was the home ground of 1. FC Mülheim in the 70s during that clubs turn in the 2. Bundesliga.
