= FC Remscheid =

German football club

- Full name: Fußball-Club Remscheid e.V.
- Nickname: FCR
- Founded: 25 October 1908; 117 years ago
- Ground: Röntgen-Stadion
- Capacity: 12,463
- Chairman: Thorsten Greuling
- Manager: Björn Joppe
- League: Landesliga Niederrhein 1 (VI)
- 2024–25: Landesliga Niederrhein 1, 5th of 18
Home colours	Away colours

FC Remscheid is a German association football club from Remscheid, North Rhine-Westphalia formed on 1 July 1990 out of the merger of BV Lüttringhausen and VfB Marathon Remscheid.

== History ==
Predecessor side Marathon was formed in 1906 and BV Lüttringhausen was founded 25 October 1908 in the northern city district of the same name. VfB merged with a club called BV Remscheid in 1971 while Lüttringhausen became the similarly named BVL 08 Remscheid in July 1985. Both clubs played primarily as third division sides, although BVL Lüttringhausen enjoyed three seasons in the 2. Bundesliga in the 80s (1982–84 and 1987–88).

After the 1 July 1990 merger of VfB and BVL the combined side Fußball-Club Remscheid won the Oberliga Nordrhein (III) title in 1991 and emerged from a promotion round playoff into the 2. Bundesliga where they played two seasons before being relegated. The club then played third and fourth tier football until bailing out part way through the 1998–99 season under the weight of debts of over DM 1.5 million. The team resumed play in the Verbandsliga Niederrhein (V) in 2000 before slipping to the Landesliga Niederrhein (VI) in 2003, where it plays today.

The VfB Remscheid has since reformed, playing under the name of VfB Marathon Remscheid 1990 in the Kreisliga B Remscheid.

== Honours ==
Historical chart of the club's league performance

as VfB Marathon 06

- German amateur championship
  - Winners: 1968
- Verbandsliga Niederrhein
  - Champions: 1974
- Landesliga Niederrhein 1
  - Champions: 1955, 1966, 1985

as BV 08 Lüttringhausen

- German amateur championship
  - Winners: 1986
- Oberliga Nordrhein
  - Champions: 1982, 1987

as FC Remscheid

- Lower Rhine Cup
  - Winners: 1990, 1991, 1994
- Oberliga Nordrhein
  - Champions: 1991
- Landesliga Niederrhein 1
  - Champions: 2009
