= SSVg Velbert =

- Full name: Sport und Spielvereinigung Velbert 1902 e.V.
- Founded: 1902; 124 years ago
- Ground: Stadion Sonnenblume
- Capacity: 6,258
- Chairman: Oliver Kuhn
- Manager: Ismail Jaroui
- League: Oberliga Niederrhein (V)
- 2025–26: Regionalliga West, 17th of 18 (relegated)
- Website: https://www.ssvg.de
Home colours	Away colours

SSVg Velbert is a German association football club based in Velbert, North Rhine-Westphalia. The club was founded in 1902 as Velberter FC 02 and is the third oldest football club in the region.

== History ==
=== Early predecessors ===
Several other predecessor sides figure in the club's history. In 1907 Ballspiel-Verein 07 Velbert was formed and this team enjoyed early success advancing rapidly through the ranks of the local football leagues. In 1914, it was joined by BV Olympia 06 Velbert. The gymnastics club Turner Velberter Turnvereins 1864 formed its own football department in 1912 and in 1919 VFC joined that group to form VFC 02, Spielabteilung des Velberter Turnvereins 1864 in a short-lived union that only lasted two years. The football department of 1864 itself became independent in 1921 to play as SSV Velbert 1912.

In 1933 VFC and BV 07 fused to form Verein für Bewegungspiele 02/07 Velbert and played in colours of green and white. The following season they finished second in their second-tier league, and the next year continued their strong play, winning sixteen consecutive matches. The onset of World War II led to a shortage of players and in 1941 the club was merged with SV Borussia Velbert 06 to form a wartime side that shortly suspended play as the conflict overtook the region.

=== Formation of the present day club ===
SSV and VfB both resumed play after the war and enjoyed a lively crosstown rivalry. Over time SSV emerged as the stronger side and by 1961 were playing third division football in the Amateurliga Niederrhein. Just three years later, in 1964, SSV and VfB agreed to a merger to form the present day club SSVg Velbert 02, playing in blue and white, with the goal of advancing to second division play.

They met their objective in 1969 when they were promoted to the Regionalliga West (II), but quickly fell away again to third division play after a 17th-place finish in their only season in tier II. A mid-1970s proposal to re-unite with wartime partner Borussia Velbert was abandoned. Ultimately, SSVg found they could not support their ambition financially and began a steady descent to fifth and sixth division football in the 1990s.

Since 2000, the club has played in the Oberliga Nordrhein (IV). They topped the standings in the 2003–04 season but were denied a license for Regionalliga play as not solid enough financially. In 2003 the club also qualified for the German Cup and defeated 1. FSV Mainz 05 on penalties in the first round, but then succumbed to Jahn Regensburg in the second round.

In recent seasons, the team has continued to earn good results with consistent top-three finishes in their division. They have qualified for 2006–07 DFB-Pokal play and played SpVgg Unterhaching in the first round.

The club earned promotion to the tier four Regionalliga West in 2012 and played there for two seasons before being relegated to the Oberliga Niederrhein in 2014. After a single season in the Oberliga in 2014–15 the club returned to the Regionalliga after winning a league championship. Velbert finished 15th in the Regionalliga in 2015–16 and was relegated back to the Oberliga once more.

== Honours ==
The club's honours:

- Lower Rhine Cup
  - Winners: 2003, 2006
- Oberliga Nordrhein
  - Champions: 2004
- Oberliga Niederrhein
  - Champions: 2015, 2023, 2025
- Verbandsliga Niederrhein
  - Champions: 1969, 2000
- Landesliga Niederrhein 1
  - Champions: 1999

== Current squad ==
As of 8 September 2026

Note: Flags indicate national team as defined under FIFA eligibility rules; some limited exceptions apply. Players may hold more than one non-FIFA nationality.

No.	Pos.	Nation	Player
1	GK	GER	Jeremias Heufken
4	DF	GER	Joey Gabriel
5	DF	GER	Tristan Duschke
7	MF	GER	Noah Bouassaria
8	MF	GER	Julio Torrens
9	FW	GER	Ege Varol
10	MF	GER	Calvin Mockschan
11	MF	GER	Max Machtemes
12	GK	GER	Jorin Turbon
13	FW	GER	Oğuzhan Çoruk
14	MF	GER	Beyhan Ametov
17	FW	GER	Robin Hilger
18	FW	GER	Oguzcan Büyükarslan

No.	Pos.	Nation	Player
19	MF	UKR	Artur Golubytskyi
20	MF	GER	Marlon Brill
21	DF	GER	Luca Köbele
22	GK	GER	Luis Plath
23	DF	GER	Max Wiese
26	DF	GER	Kilian-Joel Wagenaar
27	DF	GER	Noah Abdel Hamid
30	MF	GER	Tom Behle
31	MF	GER	Ismail Remmo
32	FW	GER	Timo Böhm
33	MF	GER	Jonas Büchte
34	MF	GER	Benjamin Hemcke
35	GK	GER	Kevin Jackmuth

== Stadium ==
The SSVg plays its games in the Stadion Sonnenblume (capacity 6,000)
