= TuS Osdorf =

- Full name: Turn- und Sportverein Osdorf von 1907 e.V.
- Founded: 1907
- Ground: Sportplatz Blomkamp
- Capacity: 2000
- Chairman: Nico Krause
- Manager: Philipp Obloch
- League: Bezirksliga West
- 2022–23: 18th (relegated)
- Website: https://www.tus-osdorf.de/
| Home colours | Away colours |

TuS Osdorf (officially: Turn- und Sportverein Osdorf von 1907 e.V.) is a sports club from the Hamburg district of Osdorf in the Altona district. The club has departments for badminton, football, gymnastics, judo, table tennis, volleyball and yoga.

== Club history ==
The club was founded in 1907 under the name Freie Turnerschaft Osdorf as part of the workers' sports movement, banned by the Nazis in 1933 and re-founded in 1946 as TuS Osdorf.In 1971, the club merged with the 1. FC Winsberg to become TuS Osdorf / Winsberg. The Winsberg addition was dropped again in 1987.

== Football department ==
Until 1971, the club's men's football team played in lower-level leagues and then achieved promotion to the second-highest Hamburg amateur class, then called the "Verbandsliga". From 1977 to 2012, there were more years in the Bezirksliga, Kreisliga and Kreisklasse. In the 2012/13 season, the club was promoted to the Landesliga Hamburg and in 2016 they were promoted as champions of the Hammonia division of the Landesliga for the first time to the highest Hamburg amateur class, the Oberliga Hamburg.

In the 2022/23 season, the first men's team finished in 18th place, which would have meant a sporting relegation to the Landesliga. However, due to a lack of player commitments from the team's squad, the club decided not to compete in that league. Instead, the first team took over the starting place of the second team in the seventh-tier Bezirksliga.

== Table tennis department ==
Since the 1990s, the table tennis department of TuS Osdorf has formed a joint team with the neighboring TTC Grün-Weiß-Rot Nienstedten. The first (out of seven) men's teams of the joint team plays in the 2022/23 season in the Hamburg-Liga, the highest Hamburg league, while the first (out of two) women's teams plays in the 2nd Landesliga. In the youth sector, the joint team has one U19 and one U15 boys' team, both of which play in the performance class, the highest youth league.

== Personalities ==
The former Bundesliga player and coach Dietmar Demuth came from the youth department of TuS Osdorf. Hamburg pianist Joja Wendt plays for the first team of the SG Grün-Weiß-Rot Nienstedten / TuS Osdorf in the Hamburg-Liga.
