= FC Kray =

German football club

- Full name: Fußballclub Kray 1909/31
- Founded: 1987
- Ground: KrayArena
- Capacity: 1,500
- Chairman: Günther Oberholz
- Manager: Michael Lorenz
- League: Oberliga Niederrhein (V)
- 2021–22: 16th
Home colours	Away colours

The FC Kray is a German football club from the Kray suburb of Essen, North Rhine-Westphalia.

The club's greatest success has been to earn promotion to the tier four Regionalliga West in 2012, and again in 2014.

== History ==
FC Kray was formed in 1987 in a merger of DJK Kray, formed in 1909, and VfL Kray, formed 1931. At the time of the merger DJK played at Kreisliga level while VfL played above that level, in the Bezirksliga, passing on this league membership to the new club.

The new club won the Bezirksliga in its first season, was promoted to the Landesliga Niederrhein and won this league, too, the following year, in 1989. FC Kray played in the tier four Verbandsliga Niederrhein from 1989 to 1993 before dropping back to the Landesliga. FC Kray took until 2000 to return to the Verbandsliga after another Landesliga title. In 2003 the club was relegated from the Verbandsliga again, under unfortunate circumstances. FC Kray had come thirteenth in the league which nominally was enough for survival but Oberliga Nordrhein club Rheydter SV declared insolvency and took up its right for a new start in the Verbandsliga, condemning FC Kray to relegation.

FC Kray returned to the Landesliga and made a number of attempts to return to the Verbandsliga, but at times also struggling against relegation to the Bezirksliga. In 2010–11 the club won a somewhat surprising Landesliga championship and finally returned to the Verbandsliga. FC Kray won this league in its first season back and would have normally been promoted to the Oberliga. However, changes to the German football league system at the end of this season meant that the club jumped instantly from the sixth to the fourth tier and entered the Regionalliga West for 2012–13 instead. The team was unsuccessful at this level, came last and was relegated in 2013. It played in the Oberliga Niederrhein, the former Verbandsliga, for a season, finished runners-up and was promoted again after the league champions, SV Hönnepel-Niedermörmter, declined promotion to the Regionalliga. The club spend two seasons at Regionalliga level before being relegated again in 2015–16.

== Honours ==
The club's honours:

- Oberliga Niederrhein
  - Runners-up: 2014
- Verbandsliga Niederrhein
  - Champions: 2012
- Landesliga Niederrhein 1
  - Champions: 1989, 2000, 2011

== Recent seasons ==
The recent season-by-season performance of the club:

Season	Division	Tier	Position
1999–2000	Landesliga Niederrhein 1	VI	1st ↑
2000–01	Verbandsliga Niederrhein	V	7th
2001–02	Verbandsliga Niederrhein	V	8th
2002–03	Verbandsliga Niederrhein	V	13th ↓
2003–04	Landesliga Niederrhein 1	VI	
2004–05	Landesliga Niederrhein 1	VI	
2005–06	Landesliga Niederrhein 1	VI	4th
2006–07	Landesliga Niederrhein 1	VI	3rd
2007–08	Landesliga Niederrhein 1	VI	6th
2008–09	Landesliga Niederrhein 1	VII	7th
2009–10	Landesliga Niederrhein 1	VII	12th
2010–11	Landesliga Niederrhein 1	VII	1st ↑
2011–12	Verbandsliga Niederrhein	VI	1st ↑
2012–13	Regionalliga West	IV	20th ↓
2013–14	Oberliga Niederrhein	V	2nd ↑
2014–15	Regionalliga West	IV	14th
2015–16	Regionalliga West	IV	18th ↓
2016–17	Oberliga Niederrhein	V	18th ↓
2017–18	Landesliga Niederrhein 2	VI	5th

- With the introduction of the Regionalligas in 1994 and the 3. Liga in 2008 as the new third tier, below the 2. Bundesliga, all leagues below dropped one tier.

=== Key ===
↑Promoted	↓ Relegated
