= Robert Palikuča =

Croatian football executive

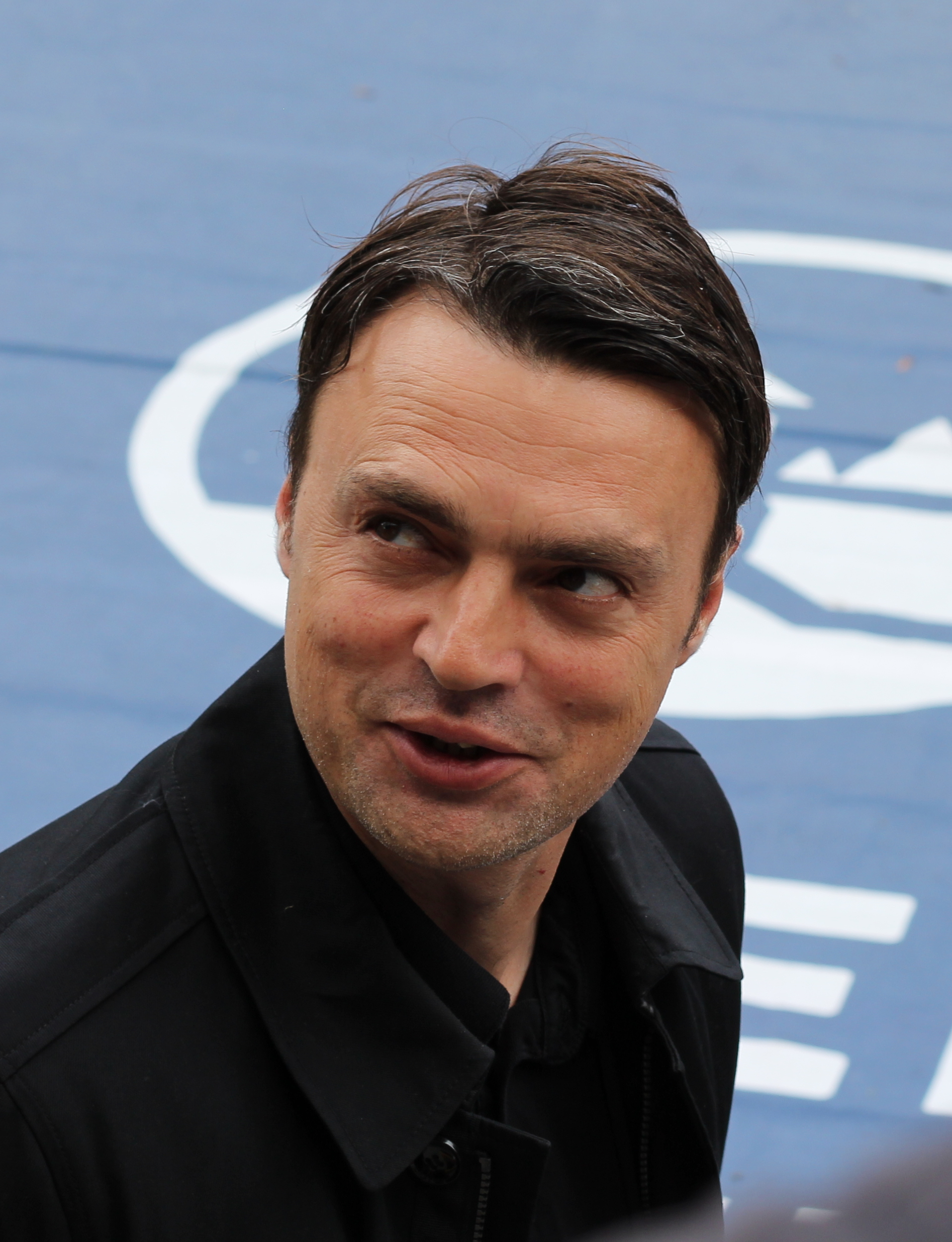
- Palikuča in 2019

Personal information
- Date of birth: 24 May 1978 (age 48)
- Place of birth: Bückeburg, Germany
- Height: 1.96 m (6 ft 5 in)
- Position: Defender

Youth career
- VfL Bückeburg NK Oriolik Oriovac

Senior career*
Years	Team	Apps	(Gls)
–2000	VfL Trier		
2000–2003	FSV Salmrohr	116	(13)
2004–2005	FC St. Pauli	62	(6)
2006–2010	Fortuna Düsseldorf	65	(6)
2006–2010	→ Fortuna Düsseldorf II	16	(0)
2010–2014	TuS Bösinghoven	38	(14)

Managerial career
- 2014–2016: TuS Bösinghoven/TSV Meerbusch
- 2021–2022: Rijeka (sporting director)
- 2023–present: Aris Thessaloniki F.C. (Technical Director)
- * Club domestic league appearances and goals

Robert Palikuča (born 24 May 1978) is a Croatian football executive and former player. He was the sporting director of HNK Rijeka until August 2022.

== Career ==
On 6 April 2019, Palikuča was announced as the new sporting director of 1. FC Nürnberg.
