= SV 19 Straelen =

German association football club

SV Straelen
- Full name: Sportverein 19 Straelen e.V.
- Founded: 1919; 106 years ago
- Ground: Sportplatz Römerstraße
- Capacity: 2,300
- Chairman: Hermann Tecklenburg
- Manager: Sunday Oliseh
- League: Regionalliga West
- 2021–22: Regionalliga West, 15th
- Website: https://svs19.com/
| Home colours | Away colours |

Sportverein 19 Straelen e.V., commonly known as simply SV 19 Straelen or SV Straelen, is a German association football club from Straelen, North Rhine-Westphalia. The club was established in 1919 and today has nearly 2,400 members with departments for athletics, badminton, basketball, gymnastics, handball, karate, swimming, and volleyball.

== History ==
Long an unheralded local side, Sportverein Straelen first won promotion to the fourth tier Oberliga Nordrhein in 1996. The team finished just inside the relegation zone the following season, but avoided being sent down when the second team side of KFC Uerdingen, which had finished ahead of SV, folded due to the loss of the club's sponsor. After their retrieve, Straelen had a three-year stay at the Oberliga level that ended with a 17th-place finish in 2001. During this period the team earned an appearance in the opening round of the DFB-Pokal (German Cup) following a 1999 regional cup win.

SV returned to the Oberliga Nordrhein (IV) in 2006 on the strength of a Verbandsliga Niederrhein (V) title. In 2007–08, the club clearly missed the qualifying criteria for the new Oberliga Nordrhein-Westfalen, coming last in the league. In an odd twist, while the first team was relegated to the Verbandsliga, the reserve team achieved promotion from the Landesliga at the same time. For this reason, the club fields both teams in the same league in the 2008–09 season, a novelty at this level of play.

They were promoted to the Regionalliga West after winning the Oberliga Niederrhein in 2017–18, but were relegated the following season. They returned to the Regionalliga in 2020.

In February of 2024, the club reported financial difficulties and is set to be relegated from the Oberliga Niederrhein after the 2023-24 season ends.

== Honours ==
The club's honours:

- Oberliga Niederrhein
  - Champions (V): 2017–18
  - Champions (V): 2019–20
- Verbandsliga Niederrhein
  - Champions (V): 1995–96, 2005–06
- Landesliga Niederrhein 2
  - Champions (V): 1982–83, 1993–94
- Lower Rhine Cup
  - Winners: 2022

== Stadium ==
SV Straelen play their home fixtures at Sportplatz Römerstraße, which has a seating area and general admission grandstand with a capacity of 2,300.

== Players ==
=== Current squad ===
As of 29 September 2021

Note: Flags indicate national team as defined under FIFA eligibility rules; some limited exceptions apply. Players may hold more than one non-FIFA nationality.

| No. | Pos. | Nation | Player |
|---|---|---|---|
| 1 | GK | GER | Julius Paris |
| 2 | DF | BEL | Kino Delorge |
| 3 | DF | NED | Jelle van Benthem |
| 4 | DF | NED | Ferry de Regt (captain) |
| 5 | DF | GER | Ole Päffgen |
| 6 | MF | GER | Maximilian Funk |
| 7 | DF | GER | Jannik Stevens |
| 8 | MF | GER | Tobias Peitz |
| 9 | FW | KOS | Arlind Shoshi |
| 11 | FW | GER | Cagatay Kader |
| 12 | DF | KOR | Jiha Yoo |
| 13 | MF | JPN | Kanta Ishii |
| 14 | MF | JPN | Toshiaki Miyamoto |
| 15 | DF | TUN | Adli Lachheb |

| No. | Pos. | Nation | Player |
|---|---|---|---|
| 16 | MF | ZIM | Kelvin Lunga |
| 17 | MF | GER | Kevin Wolze |
| 18 | MF | GER | Timo Mehlich |
| 19 | FW | GER | Gianluca Rizzo |
| 20 | MF | GER | Irwin Pfeiffer |
| 21 | DF | GER | Noah Holtschoppen |
| 22 | GK | GER | Kevin Kratzsch |
| 24 | MF | POR | Fabio Ribeiro |
| 25 | DF | GER | Martin Gyameshie |
| 26 | DF | GHA | Uzair Alhassan |
| 27 | GK | GER | Robin Udegbe |
| 28 | MF | GER | Glody Ngyombo |
| 29 | FW | AFG | Amir Ahmadi |
| 30 | DF | CRO | Vedran Berić |
