= Oberliga Nordrhein =

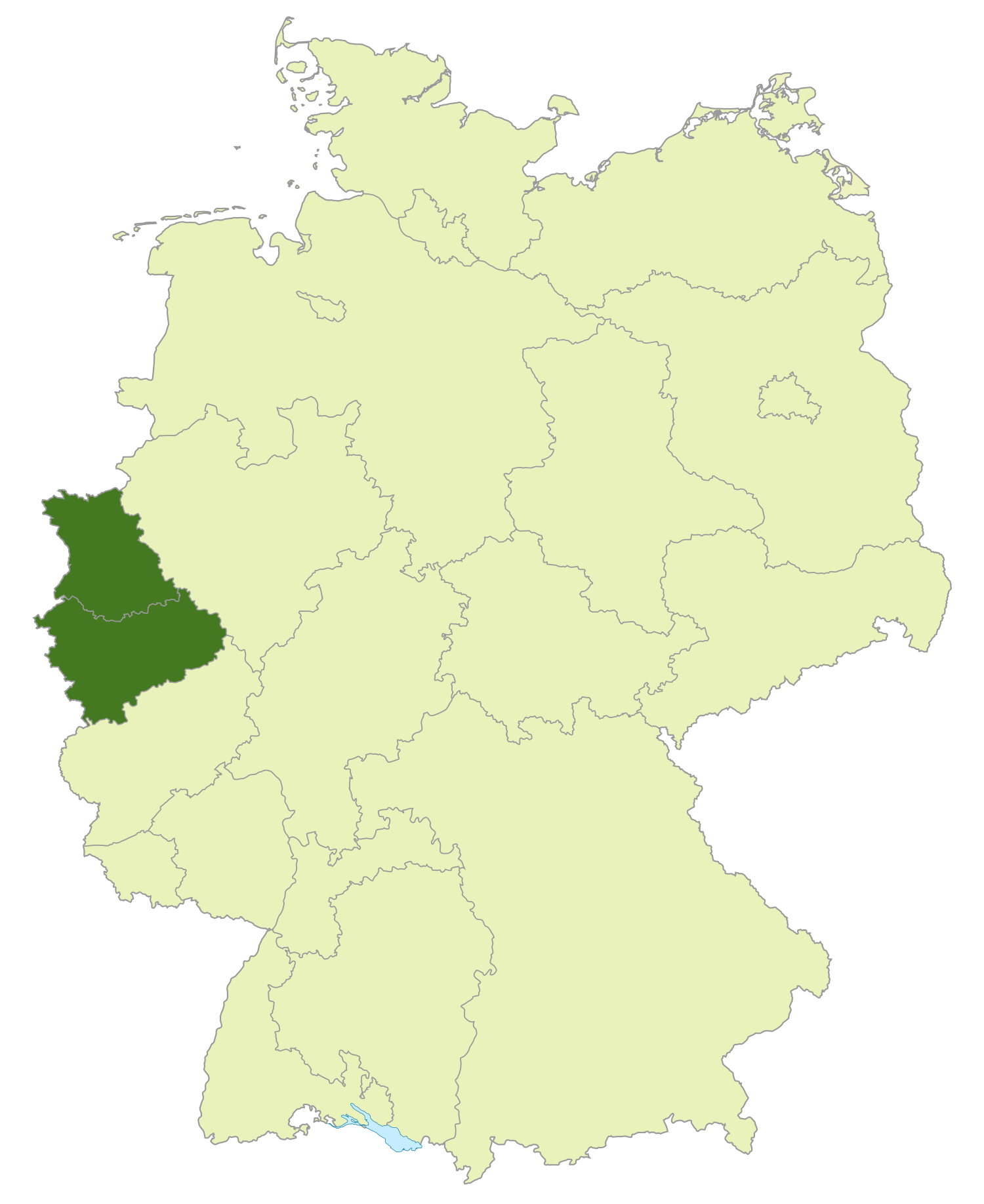
- Founded: 1978
- Folded: 2008 (30 seasons)
- Replaced by: NRW-Liga
- Country: Germany
- State: North Rhine-Westphalia
- Level on pyramid: until 1994: Level 3 since 1995: Level 4
- Promotion to: Regionalliga Nord
- Relegation to: Verbandsliga Mittelrhein; Verbandsliga Niederrhein
- Last champions: Borussia Mönchengladbach II (2007–08)

The Oberliga Nordrhein was the highest Football League in the region of Nordrhein which is part of the state of North Rhine-Westphalia from 1978 to 2008. In its last season, it was one of nine Oberligas in German football, the 4th tier of the German football league system. In 2008, it was replaced by the NRW-Liga (Oberliga Nordrhein-Westfalen), a new statewide league.

== Overview ==
The league was formed in 1978 as a highest level of play for the two regions of Mittelrhein and Niederrhein, which cover the western half of the state of Nordrhein-Westfalen. The main reason for the creation of this league was to allow its champion direct promotion to the 2nd Bundesliga Nord rather than having to go through a promotion play-off. It was created from nine clubs from the Verbandsliga Mittelrhein and seven clubs from the Verbandsliga Niederrhein which remained as the leagues below the Oberliga. Additionally, two teams from the 2nd Bundesliga were relegated to the new league, bringing the initial number of teams to eighteen.

Originally, the league was called Amateur Oberliga Nordrhein, from 1994 this was shortened to just Oberliga Nordrhein.

With the introduction of the unified 2nd Bundesliga in 1981, direct promotion for the Oberliga champions became impossible again because there were eight of them competing for four promotion spots. The champion of the Oberliga Nordrhein had to compete with the winners of the Oberligas Nord, Berlin and Westfalen for two 2nd Bundesliga spots.

Upon creation of the Regionalligas in 1994, the champions of the Oberligas were directly promoted again, however the Oberligas slipped to fourth tier in the German football league system. The top six teams in the Oberliga that year were qualified for the new Regionalliga West/Südwest, however, the champion, Fortuna Düsseldorf, won promotion to the 2nd Bundesliga and Bayer Leverkusen II declined, therefore only four teams went to the Regionalliga, the clubs being:

- Alemannia Aachen
- SC Brück, merged with Viktoria Köln in 1994 to form Preußen Köln.
- 1. FC Bocholt
- Bonner SC

Additionally to those four clubs, two teams from the Nordrhein region were relegated from the 2nd Bundesliga in 1994, entering the Regionalliga as well, these being the Wuppertaler SV and the Rot-Weiß Essen.

With the reduction of the number of Regionalligas from four to two in 2000, the Oberliga Nordrhein was now located below the Regionalliga Nord.

With the creation of the 3rd Liga in 2008 the Oberliga Nordrhein was replaced by the Oberliga Nordrhein-Westfalen, which now is the fifth tier of the league system. The Oberliga Nordrhein ceased to exit after 30 seasons. Its clubs were split up over three league levels. The first four teams were promoted to the new Regionalliga West, clubs from place five to eleven went to the new Oberliga while the bottom seven teams were relegated to the Verbandsligas.

The last round of games to be played in the league was on 18 May 2008.

Throughout the league's existence the two leagues below the Oberliga were:

- Verbandsliga Niederrhein
- Verbandsliga Mittelrhein

The Schwarz-Weiß Essen is the only club to have played all 30 seasons in the league.

== Champions of the Oberliga Nordrhein ==
The league champions:

Season	Club
1978–79	Rot-Weiß Oberhausen
1979–80	1. FC Bocholt
1980–81	1. FC Köln II
1981–82	BVL Remscheid
1982–83	Rot-Weiß Oberhausen
1983–84	1. FC Bocholt
1984–85	Rot-Weiß Essen
1985–86	Rot-Weiß Essen
1986–87	BVL Remscheid
1987–88	MSV Duisburg
1988–89	MSV Duisburg
1989–90	Wuppertaler SV
1990–91	FC Remscheid
1991–92	Wuppertaler SV
1992–93	Rot-Weiß Essen

Season	Club
1993–94	Fortuna Düsseldorf
1994–95	Rot-Weiß Oberhausen
1995–96	Germania Teveren
1996–97	Bonner SC
1997–98	Bayer Leverkusen II
1998–99	Rot-Weiß Essen
1999–2000	Wuppertaler SV
2000–01	Bayer Leverkusen II
2001–02	1. FC Köln II
2002–03	Wuppertaler SV
2003–04	SSVg Velbert
2004–05	Bayer Leverkusen II
2005–06	Borussia Mönchengladbach II
2006–07	Rot-Weiß Oberhausen
2007–08	Borussia Mönchengladbach II

- In its 30-year history, three clubs managed to win the league three times, Wuppertaler SV, Rot-Weiß Essen and Rot-Weiß Oberhausen.

== Placings in the Oberliga Nordrhein 1978 to 2008 ==
The final placings in the league:

Club	79	80	81	82	83	84	85	86	87	88	89	90	91	92	93	94	95	96	97	98	99	00	01	02	03	04	05	06	07	08
MSV Duisburg	B	B	B	B	2B	2B	2B	2B	2	1	1	2B	2B	B	2B	B	B	2B	B	B	B	B	2B	2B	2B	2B	2B	B	2B	B
Alemannia Aachen	2B	2B	2B	2B	2B	2B	2B	2B	2B	2B	2B	2B	2	6	3	2	R	R	R	R	R	2B	2B	2B	2B	2B	2B	2B	B	2B
Rot-Weiß Essen	2B	2B	2B	2B	2B	2B	1	1	2B	2B	2B	2B	2B	2	1	2B	R	R	2B	R	1	R	R	R	R	R	2B	R	2B	R
Wuppertaler SV ^{5}	2B	2B	3	6	9	3	6	12	11	3	3	1	3	1	2B	2B	R	R	R	R	R	1	2	2	1	R	R	R	R	R
Fortuna Düsseldorf	B	B	B	B	B	B	B	B	B	2B	2B	B	B	B	2B	1	2B	B	B	2B	2B	R	R	R	8	2	R	R	R	R
Rot-Weiß Oberhausen	1	2B	2B	4	1	2B	2B	2B	2B	2B	19					7	1	R	R	R	2B	2B	2B	2B	2B	2B	2B	R	1	R
Borussia M'gladbach II																				4	7	3	8	6	2	3	2	1	R	1
Bayer Leverkusen II				5	12	10	10	6	10	7	7	6	4	5	5	5	9	5	3	1	R	R	1	R	R	4	1	R	R	2
1. FC Köln II	3	6	1	7	14	4	11	5	8	5	11	8	15		9	10	5	9	7	7	10	13	3	1	R	R	R	R	8	3
1. FC Kleve																										9	6	3	7	4
Schwarz-Weiß Essen	4	2	7	10	8	7	2	8	4	2	8	11	9	12	11	9	8	3	5	8	8	9	6	9	6	12	5	9	6	5
SSVg Velbert																							4	4	3	1	3	4	3	6
MSV Duisburg II																						8	7	12	17		9	10	5	7
Germania Dattenfeld																														8
Alemannia Aachen II												16												8	16		7	7	2	9
Bonner SC	7	10	16					13	5	14	9	14	16		4	6	R	R	1	R	13	15		10	12	15	16	2	4	10
Fortuna Düsseldorf II															15			8	2	3	11	11	11	17						11
Wuppertaler SV II																											14	8	9	12
KFC Uerdingen	2B	B	B	2B	2B	B	B	B	B	B	B	B	B	2B	B	2B	B	B	2B	2B	2B	R	R	R	R	R	R	11	10	13
TuRu Düsseldorf																											10	15	11	14
VfB Homberg													12	16														6	15	15
VfB Speldorf						17																						12	14	16
SSG Bergisch Gladbach										16									11	15						18			12	17
SV Straelen																			6	14	6	6	17						13	18
1. FC Bocholt	2	1	2B	3	2	1	4	3	13	9	4	3	10	8	2	4	R	R	R	11	12	10	10	5	7	10	11	5	16	
Union Solingen	2B	2B	2B	2B	2B	2B	2B	2B	2B	2B	2B	18					13	14							14	13	8	14	17	
GFC Düren 09																									9	11	13	13	18	
FC Junkersdorf																											12	16		
FC Wegberg-Beeck																			4	6	3	12	14	18				17		
Yurdumspor Köln																										7	17	18		
SV Adler Osterfeld ^{6}																					2	7	5	7	4	5	4			
Borussia Freialdenhoven																							9	13	15	14	15			
Fortuna Köln	2B	2B	2B	2B	2B	2B	2B	2B	2B	2B	2B	2B	2B	2B	2B	2B	2B	2B	2B	2B	2B	2B	R	R	10	8	18			
Borussia Wuppertal ^{5}																								3	5	6				
Viktoria Köln ^{2}	2B	2B	2B	2	3	2	7	4	3	6	6	10	11	9	6	16	R	7	14		4	2	13	11	11	16				
Ratinger SpVgg																							12	15	13	17				
Rheydter SV										12	5	2	5	11	8	13	11	12	9	13	5	5	15	14	18					
SV Hamborn 07			2	9	13	15		9	9	4	12	7	8	4	13	15	16							16						
TuS Euskirchen																						14	18							
FC Remscheid ^{1}		3	4	1	2B	2B	3	2	1	2B	2	5	1	2B	2B	8	2	2	R	R	R	4	19							
Germania Teveren																11	4	1	R	R	9	16								
SV Baesweiler	6	11	13	15		13	17		18									6	12	10	14	17								
TuS Langerwehe	10	5	15		6	16							14	15			10	15		9	15									
SuS Dinslaken																	6	11	13	12	16									
Rhenania Würselen																				2	17									
KFC Uerdingen II ^{4}		12	10	12	16														8	5										
FV Bad Honnef	9	7	11	13	10	5	9	10	12	10	13	12	7	3	7	12	12	10	10	16										
VfL Rheinbach																		13	15											
SC Jülich 1910 ^{3}	18		12	14	11	6	5	16		8	14	4	6	10	14		3	4												
Preussen Krefeld														7	10	14	7	16												
1. FC Viersen	17		9	18		11	8	11	14	13	10	9	13	14			14													
DJK Winfriedia Mülheim																	15													
SC Brück ^{2}											15	17		13	12	3														
1. FC Wülfrath															16															
Spfr. Katernberg												13	17																	
VfB Remscheid ^{1}	11	14							6	11	16	15																		
VfB Langenfeld									7	15	17																			
SV Wermelskirchen											18																			
VfL Rhede					17		14	14	15	17																				
Olympia Bocholt	5	4	6	11	5	12	18			18																				
Viktoria Goch					7	9	12	7	16																					
TuS Lindlar									17																					
SG Düren 99						14	13	15																						
SV Siegeburg 04	8	9	17		15		15	17																						
TuS Xanten	13	8	5	8	4	8	16																							
VfB Bottrop				16																										
SpVgg Frechen			8	17																										
ASV Wuppertal	12	13	14																											
Rhenania Richterich		15																												
RSV Moers	14	16																												
Westwacht Aachen		17																												
Borussia Brand	15																													
FC Niederembt	16																													

=== Notes ===
- ^{1} FC Remscheid was formed as BV Lüttringhausen, changed its name to BVL Remscheid in 1985 and merged in 1990 with VfB Remscheid to form FCR.
- ^{2} In 1994 Viktoria Köln merged with SC Brück to form Preußen Köln but reverted to its old name Viktoria in 2002.
- ^{3} In 1996 SC Jülich 1910 withdrew from the league.
- ^{4} In 1998 KFC Uerdingen II withdrew from the league.
- ^{5} In 2004 Wuppertaler SV merged with Borussia Wuppertal to form Wuppertaler SV Borussia.
- ^{6} In 2005 Adler Osterfeld withdrew from the league.

=== Key ===
Symbol	Key
B	Bundesliga (1963–present)
2B	2. Bundesliga (1974–present)
R	Regionalliga West/Südwest (1994–2000); Regionalliga Nord (2000–2008)
1	League champions
Place	League
Blank	Played at a league level below this league

== Founding Members of the Oberliga Nordrhein ==
The Oberliga started in 1978 with 18 clubs from two regions and the 2. Bundesliga.

From the 2. Bundesliga Nord:

- 1. FC Bocholt
- Schwarz-Weiß Essen

From the Verbandsliga Niederrhein:

- Olympia Bocholt
- Rot-Weiß Oberhausen
- VfB Remscheid
- TuS Xanten
- 1. FC Viersen
- ASV Wuppertal
- RSV Meerbeck

From the Verbandsliga Mittelrhein:

- Viktoria Köln
- SV Baesweiler 09
- Bonner SC
- 1. FC Köln II
- SC Jülich 1910
- TuS Langerwehe
- SV Siegburg 04
- FC Niederembt
- FV Bad Honnef
- Borussia Brand

== Disbanding of the league ==
At the end of the 2007–08 season, the Oberliga Nordrhein was disbanded and its clubs distributed to various leagues according to the season's final standings:

To the Regionalliga West:

- Borussia Mönchengladbach II
- Bayer 04 Leverkusen II
- 1. FC Köln II
- 1. FC Kleve

To the Oberliga Nordrhein-Westfalen:

- Schwarz-Weiß Essen
- SSVg Velbert
- MSV Duisburg II
- Germania Dattenfeld
- Alemannia Aachen II
- Bonner SC
- Fortuna Düsseldorf II

To the Verbandsliga Mittelrhein:

- SSG Bergisch Gladbach

To the Verbandsliga Niederrhein:

- Wuppertaler SV II
- VfB Homberg
- KFC Uerdingen 05
- TuRU Düsseldorf
- VfB Speldorf
- SV Straelen
