= VfB Homberg =

German football club

- Full name: Verein für Bewegungsspiele Homberg e. V.
- Founded: 1889
- Ground: PCC-Stadion
- Capacity: 3,000
- Chairman: Thomas Bungart
- Manager: Michael Boris
- League: Landesliga Niederrhein 1 (VI)
- 2025–26: Oberliga Niederrhein (V), 17th of 18 (relegated)
Home colours	Away colours

The VfB Homberg is a German association football club from the Homberg quarter of Duisburg, North Rhine-Westphalia. The club was formed July 1969 through the merger of Homberger Spielverein and Sportvereinigung 89/19 Hochheide.

== History ==
=== Homberger SV ===
Homberger traces its roots back to 7 June 1903's establishment of Fussballverein Teutonia Homberg, which joined Moerser Spielverein on 3 February 1910 to form Grafschafter Spielverein Moers. The following year SV was established as a separate side out of this association. In 1919, the club grew through a merger with Sport Club Preussen 1908 Homberg and the subsequent addition of the football department of SC Union Homberg.

Homberg made an appearance in the 1930 final playoff round of the Westdeutschland Fussball Verband, one of seven regional leagues sending representatives to the national playoffs. Three years later German football was restructured under the Third Reich into sixteen top flight Gauligen. The team did not initially qualify to play at that level, but won promotion to the Gauliga Niederrhein for single season appearances in 1934 and 1943.

SV played in the Amateurliga Niederrhein (III) in the late 1940s and captured divisional titles in 1953, 1955, 1963, and 1964. They advanced to the final of the national amateur championship in 1953 where they lost 3–2 to SV Bergisch-Gladbach.

=== SpVgg 89/19 Hochheide ===
The Hochheider side was established in 1919 as Sportverein Hochheide and was in 1922, joined in its turn, by the football department of SC Union Homberg. In 1923 the association played as Sportvereinigiung 19 Homberg-Hochheide until later simply going as SpVgg 19 Hochheide.

In the aftermath of World War II, SpVgg joined Turnverein 1889 Hochheide to form SG Hochheide which later adopted the more traditional name SpVgg 89/19 Hochheide. This club also played in the Amateurliga Neiderrhein (III) beginning in the late 1940s and fielded strong sides through the early 1950s before being relegated to Landesliga play in 1963.

=== The united club ===
Following the 1969 merger that formed VfB, the united club carried on in the Amateurliga Niederrhein. Despite being relegated in 1974, the team earned an appearance in the opening round of the 1975 DFB Pokal (German Cup) on the strength of a regional cup win and were put out 3–1 by DJK Gütersloh.

VfB won promotion to the Oberliga Nordrhein (IV) for a two-year stint in 1990. They re-appeared in the fourth tier in 2005 and played in the tier-five Oberliga Niederrhein until 2015, when they were relegated. A league championship in the Landesliga in 2015–16 took the club back up to the Oberliga, which they won in 2019 to gain promotion to the Regionalliga West.

== Honours ==
- Oberliga Niederrhein (V)
  - Champions: 2019

as Homberger SV

- German amateur championship
  - Finalist: 1953
- Amateurliga Niederrhein
  - Champions: 1953, 1955, 1963, 1964

== Stadium ==
VfB Homberg play their home games in the PCC-Stadion, which has capacity of 3,000, including a 900-seat covered grandstand. The stadium also serves as the home venue of women's Bundesliga side FCR 2001 Duisburg.
