= TV Jahn Hiesfeld =

German sports club

- Full name: Turnverein Jahn Hiesfeld e.V.
- Founded: 1906
- Ground: Stadion am Freibad, Dinslaken
- Capacity: 5,000
- Manager: Markus Kay
- League: Landesliga Niederrhein (VI)
- 2018–19: Oberliga Niederrhein (V), 16th (relegated)
- Website: http://www.tv-jahn-hiesfeld-fussball.eu/
Home colours

The Turnverein Jahn Hiesfeld e.V. is a German sports club in Dinslaken.

In addition to association football, handball, hockey, tennis, athletics, swimming, volleyball, and taekwondo, various recreational sports and gymnastics courses are also offered.

== History ==
TV Jahn Hiesfeld was founded on 14 October 1906, but it was only in 1945 when it created the football department. The club is so far one of the largest in the Lower Rhine.

The club currently plays in the tier five Oberliga Niederrhein.

== Honours ==
The club's honours:

- Lower Rhine Cup
  - Runners-up: 2014

== Former players ==
- (West Germany) Wolfgang de Beer, former West German U-21 international, former goalkeeping coach of Borussia Dortmund
- (Turkey) Serkan Çalik, later played for Gençlerbirliği

== Former coaches ==
- (West Germany) Christian Schreier (2010–2011)
