= TSV Meerbusch =

German football club

TuS Meerbusch
- Full name: Turn- und Sportverein Meerbusch e. V.
- Founded: 1964 (as TuS 64 Bösinghoven); 2015 (merger with ASV Lank)
- Ground: Sportplatz Windmühlenweg, Meerbusch
- Capacity: 1,500
- President: Johannes Peters
- Coach: Robert Palikuća
- League: Oberliga Niederrhein (V)
- 2025–26: Oberliga Niederrhein, 6th of 18
- Website: http://www.tus64.de/

Turn- und Sportverein Meerbusch is a German football club currently playing in the Oberliga Niederrhein (V).

== History ==
TuS Bösinghoven was founded in 1964 and played throughout its early history at the local level. In the mid-2000s, Christoph Peters took over the management of the association and oversaw a steady improvement in the fortunes of the club, including three consecutive promotions that brought TuS from Kreisliga (IX) play, through the Bezirksliga Niederrhein (VIII), to the Landesliga Niederrhein (VII) in 2009. That rise was briefly interrupted by a 9th-place result there, but quickly resumed with a finish as runners-up in 2010–11 to Hamborn 07, and an advance to the Verbandsliga Niederrhein (VI). The club took up play in the fifth tier Oberliga Niederrhein (V) in 2012.

Effective 1 July 2015, the club merged with ASV Lank to form the new TSV Meerbusch.

Former players include Bekim Kastrati, Oliver Hampel and Robert Palikuća.
