= Sportfreunde Baumberg =

German football club

- Full name: Sportfreunde Baumberg e. V.
- Nickname: Blau-weiß (Blue-whites)
- Founded: 1962
- Ground: MEGA-Stadion
- Capacity: 1,000
- Chairman: Jürgen Schick
- Manager: Markus Kurth
- League: Oberliga Niederrhein (V)
- 2025–26: Oberliga Niederrhein, 9th of 18
- Website: http://www.sfbaumberg.de/

Sportfreunde Baumberg is a German amateur football club from the neighbourhood of Baumberg in Monheim am Rhein, North Rhine-Westphalia. Founded in 1962, the team plays in the Oberliga Niederrhein in the fifth tier of the German football league system.

== History ==
As the winners of the 2013 Lower Rhine Cup, the club played in the 2013–14 DFB-Pokal. In the first round on 3 August, it lost 4–1 at home to FC Ingolstadt 04 of the 2. Bundesliga.

After three seasons in the tier five Oberliga Niederrhein, the club was relegated to the Landesliga Niederrhein (tier six) at the end of the 2014–15 season but bounced back immediately with a league championship and promotion there.

A new stadium will be built within the Sportzentrum am Kielsgraben which will be finished in the midst of 2025.

== Honours ==
The club's honours:

- Lower Rhine Cup
  - Winners: 2013
- Landesliga Niederrhein 2
  - Champions: 2006, 2010
- Landesliga Niederrhein 1
  - Champions: 2016
