= 1. FC Kleve =

German football club

- Full name: 1. Fußballclub Kleve 63/03 e. V.
- Founded: 1863/1903
- Ground: Volksbank-Arena
- Capacity: 5,000
- Chairman: Gerd van Koeverden
- Manager: Georg Kreß
- League: Landesliga Niederrhein 1 (VI)
- 2025–26: Oberliga Niederrhein (V), 16th of 18 (relegated)
Home colours	Away colours

1. FC Kleve is a German association football club from the city of Kleve, North Rhine-Westphalia very near the Dutch border. The club was established in 2000 out of the merger of VfB Lohengrin 03 Kleve and Sportclub Kleve 63. The footballers are today part of a larger sports club that also has departments for aerobics, gymnastics, Karate, and tennis.

== History ==
=== Sportclub Kleve 63 ===
SC Kleve was founded in 1906 as Fussball Club Cleve and merged with Spieleverein 1909 Cleve in 1917 to create FC Hohenzollern Cleve. Two years later the club was briefly known as Verein für Jungend und Volksspiele Cleve before becoming part of Turnverein Cleve 1863. In 1924, the footballers left to form an independent club called Sportclub Cleve 1863. After 1925 the city was known as "Kleve" and the sports club adopted the same form.

Following World War II, SC made occasional appearances as a lower table side in third-tier football in the Amateurliga Niederrhein. Following the reorganization of German football and the formation of the top-flight Bundesliga in 1963, SC managed another three season of third division play (1963–64, 1969–71) before slipping back to lower level local competition.

=== VfB Lohengrin 03 Kleve ===
The Lohengrin side was established in 1903 as VfB Cleve and was made up largely of workers from the "van-den-Berghschen Margarinewerke" earning them the nickname "de Botter". The club's home field Sportplatz an der Triftstraße was built with the support of the margarine company and on 16 October 1910 was the site of the first international match between Germany and Holland held on German soil (1:2).

This team merged with Turnclub Merkur and Clever Schwimm-Sportclub in 1920 to form Verein für Turn- und Bewegungsspiele Cleve. A new association known as VfL 95 Merkur Cleve was formed out of this club the following year and they quickly re-adopted the traditional name VfB 03 Cleve. After 1925 this side also used the form "Kleve". In January 1946, VfB joined SuL Kleve, itself formed through the 1936 merger of VfB Lohengrin 1921 and FC Sparta 1921 Kleve, to create VfB Lohengrin 03 Kleve.

Like SC, VfB made occasional appearances in third-tier football in the Amateurliga Niederrhein and had a similarly undistinguished record at that level.

=== 1. FC Kleve ===
These key predecessor sides were acknowledged with the adoption of the name 1. FC Kleve 1863/1903 in the 2000 merger that formed the present-day club. In 2003, 1. FC won its way to the Oberliga Nordrhein (IV) where they competed until 2008, when the club earned promotion to the new Regionalliga West. The club has declined since then, being relegated from the Regionalliga in 2009 and the Oberliga in 2011, playing in the tier six Landesliga Niederrhein for a time. A second-place finish in 2014–15 took the club to the play-offs for promotion to what is now the Oberliga Niederrhein which they lost to eventual winner SC Düsseldorf-West with the same result in the following season, this time losing to Cronenberger SC.

== Current squad ==
Note: Flags indicate national team as defined under FIFA eligibility rules; some limited exceptions apply. Players may hold more than one non-FIFA nationality.

No.	Pos.	Nation	Player
1	GK	GER	Stefan Ortega
2	DF	GER	Armel Bella-Kotchap
3	DF	GER	Taylan Bulut
4	DF	MAR	Zakaria El Ouahdi
5	DF	BEL	Maxim De Cuyper
6	MF	SUI	Ardon Jashari
7	MF	POR	Ricardo Horta
8	MF	NED	Jerdy Schouten
9	FW	GER	Niclas Füllkrug
10	MF	GRE	Giannis Konstantelias
11	MF	CZE	Pavel Šulc
13	GK	GER	Loris Karius

No.	Pos.	Nation	Player
14	MF	GER	Fabian Reese
15	MF	NGA	Raphael Onyedika
16	FW	GER	Nicolas Kühn
17	FW	GER	Kevin Schade
18	DF	GER	Felix Uduokhai
19	FW	GER	Ragnar Ache
20	MF	GER	Caspar Jander
23	DF	GER	Jeremy Toljan
24	DF	GER	Thilo Kehrer
27	DF	GER	Kai Wagner
28	DF	GER	Malick Thiaw
37	MF	GER	Max Grüger

== Honours ==
SC Kleve 63

- Landesliga Niederrhein 2 (IV)
  - Champions: 1969

VfB Lohengrin 03 Kleve

- Landesliga Niederrhein 2 (IV)
  - Champions: 1995

1. FC Kleve

- Landesliga Niederrhein 2 (VI)
  - Champions: 2002, 2018
- Verbandsliga Niederrhein (V)
  - Champions: 2003
