= TuRU Düsseldorf =

German sports club

- Full name: Turn- und Rasensport Union 1880 e.V. Düsseldorf
- Nickname(s): Die Tauben (The Doves)
- Founded: 1919
- Ground: Stadion an der Feuerbachstraße
- Capacity: 7,500
- Chairman: Paul-Ludwig Spies
- League: Oberliga Niederrhein (V)
- 2017–18: 14th

TuRU Düsseldorf is a German sports club (football and handball) from the city of Düsseldorf, North Rhine-Westphalia.

== History ==
Turn- und Rasensport Union Düsseldorf claims a number of early Düsseldorf clubs in its heritage. Düsseldorf Fußball Klub Union was created on 10 May 1905 as Düsselsdorfer Fußball Klub Union through the merger of Vorwärts Düsseldorf and Borussia Düsseldorf with onetime members of Fußball Club Britannia Düsseldorf. The club was renamed Düsseldorfer Sport Club Union in 1911 and in 1913 advanced to the final of the Westdeutcher Fußball Verband where they lost to Duisburger Spielverein, which then went on to the national final against VfB Leipzig. SC joined Verein für Rasensport Düsseldorf and Friedrichstädter Turnverein 1880 to form TuRU in 1919. Until July 1916 VfR had played as Sport Club Athen Düsseldorf.

TuRU in its turn advanced to the final of the Westdeutcher Fußball Verband in 1923 where they dropped a 3:4 decision to Arminia Bielefeld. Two years later they avenged themselves on both Duisburger SV and Bielefeld, defeating these sides on their way to a national quarterfinal match up versus Hertha BSC Berlin where they were eliminated.

From 1935 to 1942 Düsseldorf played in the Gauliga Niederrhein, one of sixteen top flight divisions formed in the 1933 reorganization of German football under the Third Reich. TuRU made its only DFB-Pokal (German Cup) appearance in 1937 in play for the Tschammerpokal, predecessor to the modern day cup competition, and also sent two representatives to the national side in the late 1930s.

Following World War II TuRU played briefly (1949–52) in the 2. Oberliga West (II), and then in the Landesliga Niederrhein (III) until late in the decade, before slipping into lower level amateur football. The club returned to the Landesliga in 1965 and established itself in fourth- and fifth-tier play over the next several decades. They captured Landesliga Niederrhein titles in 1994 (V tier) and 2003 (VI tier). Düsseldorf was promoted to the Oberliga Nordrhein on the strength of their 2004 Verbandsliga Niederrhein (V) title and have played at that level until 2008, earning lower-table results.

The club currently plays in the tier five Oberliga Niederrhein.

== Honours ==
The club's honours:

- Landesliga Niederrhein (V–VI)
  - Champions: 1994, 2003
- Verbandsliga Niederrhein (V)
  - Champions: 2004

== Stadium ==
TuRU Düsseldorf plays its home fixtures at the Stadion an der Feuerbachstraße, which has a seating capacity of 7,500.

== Current football squad ==
Note: Flags indicate national team as defined under FIFA eligibility rules; some limited exceptions apply. Players may hold more than one non-FIFA nationality.

No.	Pos.	Nation	Player
1	GK	(Germany) GER	Dennis Prostka
2	DF	(Germany) GER	Marc Sesterhenn
3	MF	(North Macedonia) MKD	Sinisa Nedeljkovic
4	DF	(Germany) GER	Stephan Bork
5	DF	(Germany) GER	Bernd Willems
6	MF	(Germany) GER	Markus Weiß
7	DF	(Germany) GER	Hassan Nounouh
8	MF	(Germany) GER	Sebastian Schweers
9	MF	(Turkey) TUR	Engin Kizilaslan
10	MF	(Spain) ESP	Miguel Lopez-Torres
11	FW	(Turkey) TUR	Fatih Duran
12	DF	(Germany) GER	Daniel Theisen

No.	Pos.	Nation	Player
13	MF	(Germany) GER	Samuel Sibilski
14	MF	(Germany) GER	Patrick Scheulen
15	MF	(Germany) GER	Dennis Homann
16	MF	(Turkey) TUR	Serdar Özdemir
17	MF	(Turkey) TUR	Aykut Ceker
18	FW	(Germany) GER	Michael Rentmeister
19	FW	(Germany) GER	Redouan Yotla
20	DF	(Spain) ESP	Daniel Rey-Alonso
22	GK	(Germany) GER	Marc Ernzer
24	MF	(Germany) GER	Domenico Cozza
30	GK	(Germany) GER	Fabian Rech
37	GK	(Germany) GER	Fabian Stanscheit
—	MF	(South Korea) KOR	Jung Yeon-woong
