= 1. FC Bocholt =

- Full name: 1. FC Bocholt
- Founded: 1900
- Ground: Stadion am Hünting
- Capacity: 3,276
- Chairman: Ludger Triphaus
- Manager: Guerino Capretti
- League: Regionalliga West (IV)
- 2025–26: Regionalliga West, 12th of 18
Home colours	Away colours	Third colours

1. FC Bocholt is a German association football club based in Bocholt, North Rhine-Westphalia.

== History ==
The team was founded 21 August 1900 as Fußball-Club Bocholt and in 1919 was joined by VfvB Bocholt, which had been established in 1917 as Ballverein Bocholt. In 1937, they merged with another local side, Ballspielverein 1919 Bocholt, which had played as the football department of Turnverein Phönix Bocholt until 1936. The new club played as BV 1900 Bocholt until after World War II and adopted its current name in 1946.

1. FC enjoyed its greatest successes through the late 1970s and early 1980s playing third-division football. They earned short-lived single-season promotions to the 2. Bundesliga in 1977–78 and 1980–81. The club also made several appearances in DFB-Pokal (German Cup) play in that period and in 1984 advanced as far as the quarter-finals before going out 2–1 to FC Bayern Munich.

After slipping out of the Regionaliga West/Südwest (III) in 1997, Bocholt played for a decade in the Oberliga Nordrhein (IV) as a mid-to-lower table side. The club had a poor 2006–07 campaign and was relegated to the Verbandsliga Niederrhein (V) play. The club dropped as far as the Landesliga Niederrhein, but a division title there in 2014 took it back up to what is now the Oberliga Niederrhein.

== Honours ==
The club's honours:

- Amateurliga Niederrhein (III)
  - Champions: 1976
- Amateuroberliga Nordrhein (III)
  - Champions: 1980, 1984
- Oberliga Niederrhein (V)
  - Champions: 2022
- Lower Rhine Cup
  - Winners: 1983

== Players ==
=== Current squad ===
As of 8 September 2026

Note: Flags indicate national team as defined under FIFA eligibility rules; some limited exceptions apply. Players may hold more than one non-FIFA nationality.

No.	Pos.	Nation	Player
1	GK	GER	Paul Grave
3	DF	NED	Elano Yegen
4	DF	GER	Kilian Zaruba
6	MF	GER	Maximilian Jansen
7	FW	GER	Patrick Kurzen
8	MF	CRO	Stipe Batarilo
9	FW	LBN	Malek Fakhro
10	FW	GER	Arnold Budimbu
12	GK	GER	Haakon Pomorin
13	DF	GER	Dominik Lanius
15	FW	GER	Lennart Garlipp
16	DF	GER	Linus Olthoff
17	MF	GER	Boran Özebl
18	MF	GER	Marlon Frey

No.	Pos.	Nation	Player
19	FW	GER	Daniel Gerstmayer
20	DF	GER	Ozan Hot
22	FW	GER	Benjamin Friesen
23	MF	GER	Mika Walther
24	DF	GER	Alexander Hahn
25	FW	GER	Marvin Lorch
28	DF	GER	Jonas Carls
33	GK	GER	Mats Remberg
37	DF	GER	Paul Seidel
38	MF	BIH	Filip Ilic
39	MF	GER	Gianluca Swajkowski (on loan from Rot-Weiss Essen)
42	FW	GER	Luca Puhe
44	FW	GER	Tim Krohn (on loan from Hansa Rostock)

=== Out on loan ===
Note: Flags indicate national team as defined under FIFA eligibility rules; some limited exceptions apply. Players may hold more than one non-FIFA nationality.

No. / Pos. / Nation / Player; — / MF / GER / Venhar Ismailji (at VfB Hilden until 30 June 2027)	No. / Pos. / Nation / Player
