= Oberliga Niederrhein =

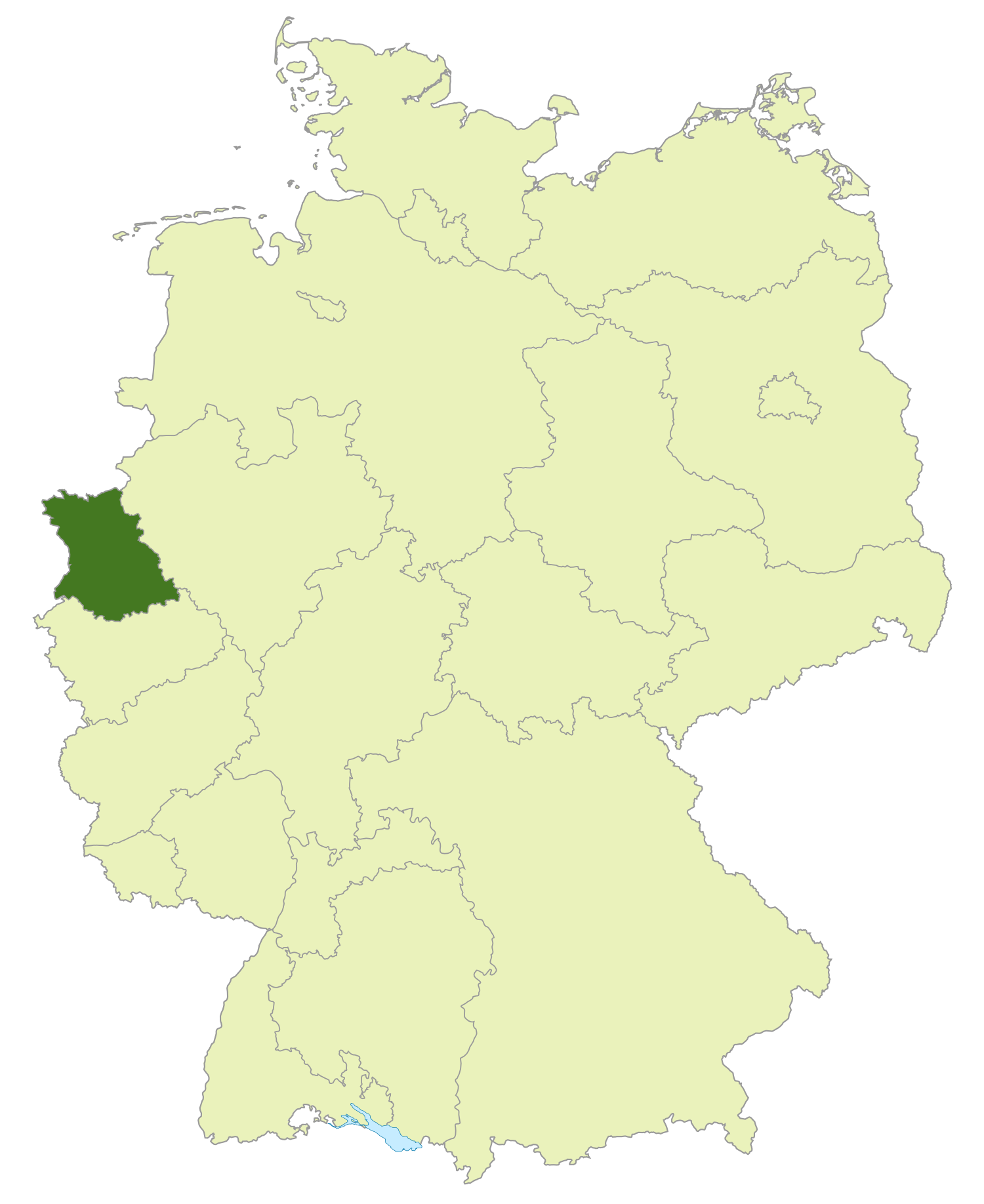
- Organising body: Lower Rhine Football Association
- Founded: 1956
- Country: Germany
- State: North Rhine-Westphalia
- Region: Lower Rhine
- Number of clubs: 18
- Level on pyramid: Level 5
- Promotion to: Regionalliga West
- Relegation to: Landesliga Niederrhein (3 divisions)
- Current champions: SSVg Velbert (2024–25)
- Current: 2026–27 Oberliga Niederrhein

The Oberliga Niederrhein (English: Premier League of the Lower Rhine) is a German amateur football division administered by the Football Association of the Lower Rhine, one of the 21 German state football associations. Being the top flight of the Lower Rhine state association, the Oberliga is currently a level 5 division of the German football league system.

== History ==
Until 1956, a total of ten Landesliga divisions, among them three divisions of Landesliga Niederrhein were the highest amateur level in the state of North Rhine-Westphalia. After the regular season, the ten Landesliga champions had to play-off for two promotion spots to 2. Oberliga West. Upon decision of the superior Western German football association, in 1956 four divisions of Verbandsliga were introduced, one of them being the Verbandsliga Niederrhein. These four divisions of Verbandsliga still exist today, with the Verbandsliga Niederrhein in 2008 renamed to Niederrheinliga and later in 2012 renamed to Oberliga Niederrhein.

The Verbandsliga Niederrhein was upon its inception the third tier of the German football league system. The league champion had to play-off the winners of the Verbandsliga Mittelrhein and the two divisions of Verbandsliga Westfalen for two promotion spots to the 2nd Oberliga West. Upon introduction of the Bundesliga in 1963, the league was set below the new Regionalliga West but remained as the third tier. With the exception of 1963 and 1974, when the league systems were changed, the champion continued to have the opportunity to win promotion. In 1964, 1970, 1976 and 1978, the league winner failed to do so; in every other season they were successful. In 1977, the runner-up was promoted as Fortuna Düsseldorf II was ineligible.

The league operated with 16 clubs throughout most of its existence, only occasionally altering the numbers to balance out promotion and relegation.

With the replacement of the Regionalliga by the 2nd Bundesliga Nord in 1974, the league champion had to gain promotion through a play-off system with the winners of the other tier-three leagues in northern Germany.

In 1978, the Amateur-Oberliga Nordrhein was formed as the third tier of football in the region compromising the area of the Verbandsliga Niederrhein and Verbandsliga Mittelrhein. One of the main reasons for this move was to provide direct promotion for the tier-three champions again. The clubs placed one to seven in the league were admitted to the new Oberliga, these being:

- Olympia Bocholt
- Rot-Weiß Oberhausen
- VfB Remscheid
- TuS Xanten
- 1. FC Viersen
- ASV Wuppertal
- RSV Meerbeck

Verbandsliga Niederrhein, together with Mittelrhein, remained as a feeder league for the new Oberliga, but now as a tier-four competition. Its champion, and in some years the runners-up, were directly promoted to the Oberliga Nordrhein.

With the re-introduction of the Regionalligen in 1994, the league slipped to tier five but remained unchanged otherwise.

From 2008, with the introduction of the 3rd Liga, the Verbandsliga Niederrhein was downgraded to the sixth tier. The league above it was then the new NRW-Liga, a merger of the Oberligen Nordrhein and Westfalen. The champion of the Verbandsliga continued to be directly promoted but since there were now four Verbandsligen below the Oberliga, the runners-up did not have the option of promotion unless the league winner declined.

The NRW-Liga existed for only for seasons before it was disbanded again in the wake of the Regionalliga West becoming a league for clubs from North Rhine-Westphalia only. While the Oberliga Westfalen was established again in one half of the state the regions of Lower Rhine and Middle Rhine opted to elevate the Niederrheinliga and Mittelrheinliga to Oberliga status instead of reforming the Oberliga Nordrhein.

== League champions ==
Season	Club
1956–57	VfL Benrath
1957–58	TuS Lintfort
1958–59	TuS Duisburg 48/99
1959–60	BV Osterfeld
1960–61	SV Neukirchen
1961–62	FV Duisburg 08
1962–63	Homberger SV
1963–64	Homberger SV
1964–65	VfB Bottrop
1965–66	VfR Neuß
1966–67	VfB Bottrop
1967–68	Eintracht Duisburg
1968–69	SSVg Velbert
1969–70	Sterkrade 06/07
1970–71	FC Bayer 05 Uerdingen
1971–72	1. FC Mülheim-Styrum
1972–73	Union Solingen
1973–74	VfB Remscheid
1974–75	Union Solingen
1975–76	1. FC Bocholt
1976–77	Fortuna Düsseldorf II
1977–78	Olympia Bocholt
1978–79	FC Bayer 05 Uerdingen II

Season	Club
1979–80	Spfr. Hamborn 07
1980–81	VfB Bottrop
1981–82	Viktoria Goch
1982–83	1. FC Viersen
1983–84	VfL Rhede
1984–85	Spfr. Hamborn 07
1985–86	VfB Langenfeld
1986–87	Rheydter SV
1987–88	SV Wermelskirchen
1988–89	Sportfreunde Katernberg
1989–90	VfB Homberg
1990–91	Preußen Krefeld
1991–92	1. FC Wülfrath
1992–93	Rot-Weiß Oberhausen
1993–94	Union Solingen
1994–95	Fortuna Düsseldorf II
1995–96	SV Straelen
1996–97	Borussia Mönchengladbach II
1997–98	Adler Osterfeld
1998–99	MSV Duisburg II
1999–2000	SSVg Velbert
2000–01	Borussia Wuppertal
2001–02	Union Solingen

Season	Club
2002–03	1. FC Kleve
2003–04	TuRU Düsseldorf
2004–05	VfB Speldorf
2005–06	SV Straelen
2006–07	Fortuna Düsseldorf II
2007–08	Rot-Weiß Essen II
2008–09	VfB Speldorf
2009–10	VfB Homberg
2010–11	KFC Uerdingen 05
2011–12	FC Kray
2012–13	KFC Uerdingen 05
2013–14	SV Hönnepel-Niedermörmter
2014–15	SSVg Velbert
2015–16	Wuppertaler SV
2016–17	KFC Uerdingen 05
2017–18	SV Straelen
2018–19	VfB Homberg
2019–20	SV Straelen
2020–21	None
2021–22	1. FC Bocholt
2022–23	SSVg Velbert
2023–24	Sportfreunde Baumberg
2024–25	SSVg Velbert

Source:"Verbandsliga Niederrhein". Das deutsche Fußball-Archiv.

- The 2013–14 champions SV Hönnepel-Niedermörmter declined promotion; FC Kray were promoted instead.
- The 2020–21 season was curtailed owing to the COVID-19 pandemic in Germany. There was no champion or promotion.

== Clubs in the Oberliga Niederrhein since 2012 ==
The final league placings of all clubs in the league since receiving Oberliga status in 2012:

Club	13	14	15	16	17	18	19	20	21	22	23	24	25
Wuppertaler SV	R	3	2	1	R	R	R	R	R	R	R	R	R
1. FC Bocholt			6	12	3	10	3	5	1	1	R	R	R
KFC Uerdingen 05	1	R	R	2	1	R	3L	3L	3L	R	6	3	R
SSVg Velbert	R	R	1	R	5	8	5	4	2	3	1	R	1
SpVg Schonnebeck				5	2	2	9	3	12	9	7	2	2
Schwarz-Weiß Essen	6	7	12	15	13	6	13	10	9	10	5	4	3
DJK Teutonia/SC St. Tönis									8	15	14	10	4
VfB Homberg	10	9	18		7	3	1	R	R	R	12	5	5
VfB 03 Hilden		13	14	14	10	13	10	8	15	2	2	6	6
FC Büderich 02												9	7
SV Sonsbeck	8	16	15								13	8	8
Germania Ratingen	5	15	3	11	8	7	6	14	4	5	4	7	9
TSV Meerbusch	15	11	10	9	15		7	6	14	11	8	14	10
SV Biemenhorst													11
1. FC Monheim						11	4	2	11	8	17		12
1. FC Kleve							12	11	5	7	15	13	13
Sportfreunde Baumberg	12	14	16		12	4	2	7	3	4	9	1	14
SC Union Nettetal							14	16	16	13	11	11	15
Sportfreunde Niederwenigern								18	19	21			16
Mülheimer FC 97												12	17
TVD Velbert								13	10	6	3	15	18
DJK Adler Union Frintrop												16	
Hamborn 07	20										10	17	
SV 19 Straelen						1	R	1	R	R	R		
MSV Düsseldorf											16		
Cronenberger SC	17				14	16		17	18	17	18		
TuRu Düsseldorf	2	8	9	4	11	14	8	9	17	12	19		
FC Kray	R	2	R	R	18			12	20	16	20		
FSV Duisburg							18		22	18	21		
TV Jahn Hiesfeld	9	4	7	3	6	5	16		21	14			
SpVgg Sterkrade-Nord									6	19			
SC Düsseldorf-West				6	9	9	15		7	20			
SC Velbert							11	15	13	22			
1. FC Mönchengladbach				16					23	23			
VfB Speldorf	11	18				12	17						
VfR Krefeld-Fischeln	19		8	7	4	15							
FSV Vohwinkel						17							
Düsseldorfer SC 99						18							
SC Kapellen-Erft	4	10	13	8	16								
SV Hönnepel-Niedermörmter	14	1	4	10	17								
MSV Duisburg II	R	5	5	13									
Rot-Weiß Oberhausen II	13	6	11	17									
TV Kalkum-Wittlaer				18									
VdS Nievenheim			17										
Rot-Weiß Essen II		12											
VfL Rhede	3	17											
SV Uedesheim	16	19											
PSV Wesel-Lackhausen		20											
Wuppertaler SV II	7												
1. FC Wülfrath	18												

=== Key ===
Symbol	Key
B	Bundesliga (1963–present)
2B	2. Bundesliga (1974–present)
3L	3. Liga (2008–present)
R	Regionalliga West (2008–present)
1	League champions
Place	League
Blank	Played at a league level below this league

== Founding members of the league ==
From the Landesliga Gruppe 1:

- TSV Eller 04
- VfL Benrath
- Grün-Weiß Viersen
- SpVgg Gräfrath
- TuRU Düsseldorf

From the Landesliga Gruppe 2:

- FV Duisburg 08
- TuS Lintfort
- SpVgg Hochheide
- Homberger SV
- SC Kleve

From the Landesliga Gruppe 3:

- TuS Duisburg 48/99
- Sterkrade 06/07
- BV Osterfeld
- 1. FC Mülheim-Styrum
- SV Borbeck
- TSG Karnap
