= Andreas Zimmermann =

German footballer (born 1969)

Personal information
- Date of birth: 28 December 1969 (age 56)
- Place of birth: West Berlin, West Germany
- Position: Defender

Team information
- Current team: Rot Weiss Ahlen (manager)

Youth career
- SV Norden-Nordwest Berlin

Senior career*
Years	Team	Apps	(Gls)
1991–1992	Spandauer BC		
1992–1993	Hertha BSC (A)		
1992–1995	Hertha BSC	45	(3)
1995–1996	Union Berlin	29	(0)
1996–2002	LR Ahlen	150	(12)
2002–2003	Rot-Weiss Essen	15	(0)
2003–2004	SC Paderborn	18	(0)
2004–2006	1. FC Kleve	57	(3)
2006	SV Siegfried Materborn		
2008	Borussia Brand		

Managerial career
- 2008–2009: Rot-Weiss Ahlen II
- 2009: Rot-Weiss Ahlen (U19)
- 2009: Rot-Weiss Ahlen (caretaker)
- 2009–2010: Rot-Weiss Ahlen (assistant)
- 2011–2013: FC Ingolstadt (U19)
- 2013–2014: Carl Zeiss Jena
- 2014–2016: Rot-Weiß Oberhausen
- 2018–2019: VSG Altglienicke
- 2019: Wuppertaler SV
- 2020–2022: Rot Weiss Ahlen
- 2023: Eintracht Trier
- 2025-2026: SV Wehen Wiesbaden
- * Club domestic league appearances and goals

Andreas Zimmermann (born 28 December 1969) is a German football manager and a former player who played as a defender. He has been the manager of Eintracht Trier since March, 2023. He began his career in his hometown of Berlin, before spending seven years playing for LR Ahlen, a team he later briefly managed.

== Playing career ==
Zimmermann began his career with Hertha BSC in 1992, who signed him from local amateur club Spandauer BC. He made 27 appearances in the 2. Bundesliga in his first season, scoring three goals, and was an occasional member of the reserve team that reached the final of the DFB-Pokal. He scored in a quarter-final win over 1. FC Nürnberg, but didn't play in the final, which Hertha's reserve team lost against Bayer Leverkusen. Over the next two seasons, Zimmermann only made eighteen appearances for the Hertha first team, and in 1995 he crossed the city to join Union Berlin, of the Regionalliga Nordost. A year later he signed for LR Ahlen, an ambitious team in the Regionalliga West, and helped them to promotion to the second tier in 2000, after a playoff victory over his old club Union Berlin. He made 60 appearances at this level, as Ahlen finished 6th and then 8th, before he left the club in 2002. He then spent a season each with Rot-Weiss Essen and SC Paderborn in the Regionalliga Nord, but only made a total of 33 appearances, due in part to injury. He spent two seasons with 1. FC Kleve of the Oberliga Nordrhein, before signing for amateur side Siegfried Materborn in 2006.

== Coaching career ==
Zimmermann ended his playing career in January 2007, when he returned to 1. FC Kleve as General Manager, but left the club after six months due to disagreements with the board. After a brief return to active football with amateurs Borussia Brand, he returned to LR Ahlen. now under the name of Rot-Weiss. He managed the reserves, and later the under-19 team, and in September 2009 he replaced Stefan Emmerling as manager. However, this was only to last a month: Zimmermann didn't have the correct coaching licences, and as the club were unable to get special dispensation from the Deutsche Fußball Liga, he was replaced by Christian Hock. He continued as assistant manager until Hock was sacked at the end of the 2009–10 season. In summer 2011, Zimmermann was appointed coach of the under-19 team of FC Ingolstadt 04, where he spent just over a year for leaving for personal reasons. He was appointed as manager of Carl Zeiss Jena in September 2013. He was sacked by Jena seven months later.

On 16 November 2020, he returned to Rot Weiss Ahlen as a caretaker manager. He was made permanent manager of the club in 2021. He remained at Rot Weiss Ahlen until November, 2022.

In March, 2023, he was hired as head coach for Eintracht Trier. After the 31st round, the team was the first to be relegated to the next league lower ("Oberliga"). His contract was then terminated prematurely one week after the end of the 2022/2023 season.

In November 2025, he became assistant manager of 3. Liga club SV Wehen Wiesbaden, working with manager Daniel Scherning. After a bad start into the 2026/2027 season, Scherning and Zimmermann were sacked with immediate effect on 14 September 2026.
