= Klaus Quinkert =

German football manager (1930–2018)

Personal information
- Date of birth: 5 December 1930
- Date of death: 11 February 2018 (aged 87)

Managerial career
- Years: Team
- 1970–1977: Bayer Uerdingen
- 1978: Rot-Weiss Essen
- 1980–1981: SpVgg Erkenschwick
- Viktoria Goch

Klaus Quinkert (5 December 1930 – 11 February 2018) was a German football manager.
