= Theodor Lohrmann =

German footballer

Theodor "Teddy" Lohrmann
Personal information
- Date of birth: 7 September 1898
- Date of death: 2 September 1971 (aged 72)
- Position: Goalkeeper

Senior career*
Years	Team	Apps	(Gls)
1908–1920	Waldhof Mannheim		
1920–1923	SpVgg Fürth		
1923–1929	Austria Wien		
1929–1930	Wiener Sport-Club		

International career
1920–1922	Germany	3	(0)

Managerial career
- Hamborn 07
- SSVg Barmen
- TuS Duisburg 48/99
- 1935–1936: Schwarz-Weiss Essen
- Preussen Krefeld
- Westende Hamborn
- TuS Rheinhausen
- Rot-Weiss Oberhausen
- KSG Oberhausen
- 1948–1953: FC Zürich
- * Club domestic league appearances and goals

Theodor Lohrmann (7 September 1898 – 2 September 1971) was a German international footballer. He was a very talented all-round athlete who also played rugby, tennis, handball and water polo, and was one of the first German professional athletes. With FK Austria Wien (then Wiener Amateursportverein) he celebrated the Austrian Championship and the Cup in 1924 and 1926. After his career he was successful as a coach. Among others, he trained Toni Turek, the 1954 World Champion goalkeeper.
