= 1956–57 DFB-Pokal =

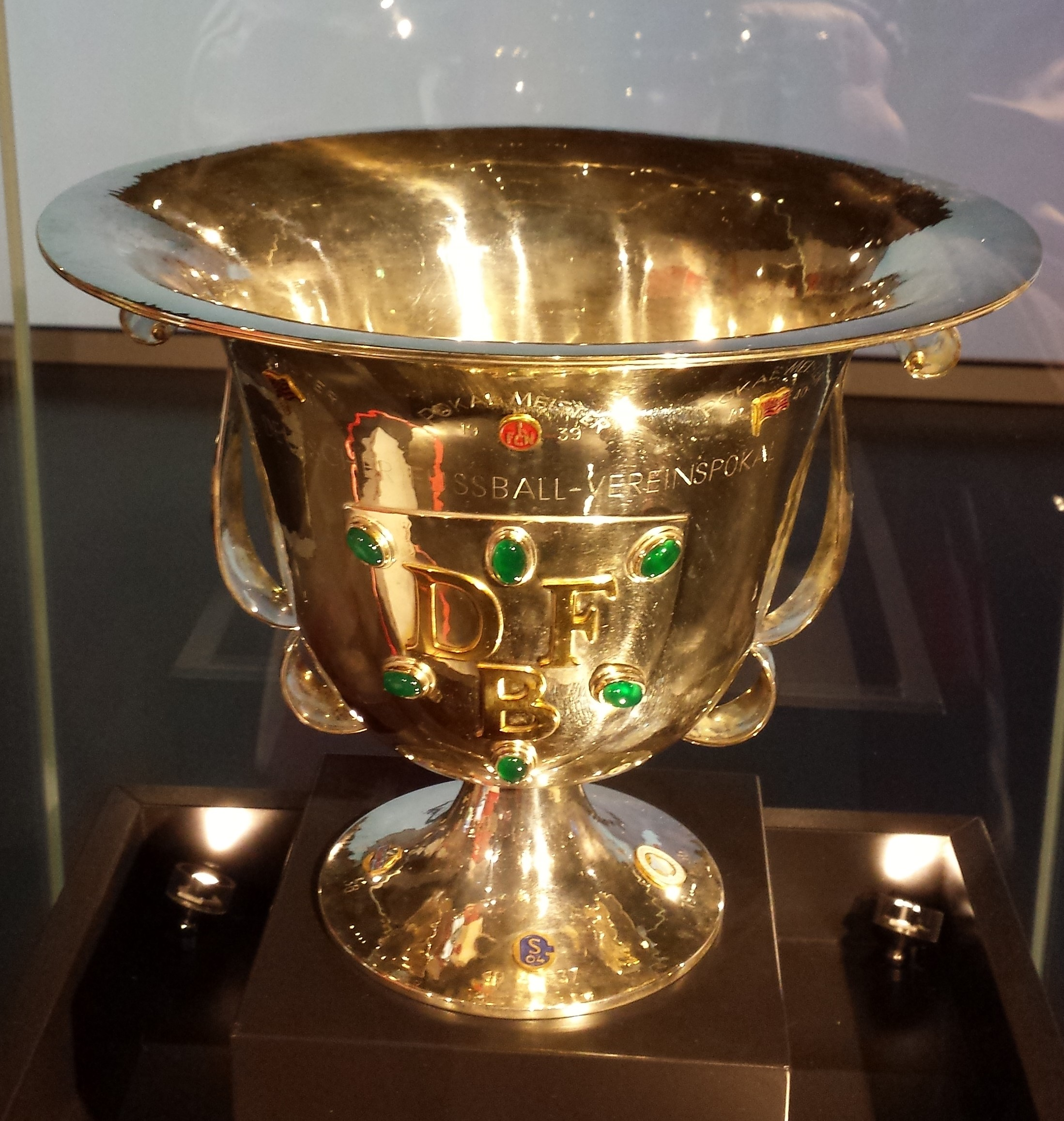
- The Trophy of 1957

Tournament details
- Country: West Germany
- Teams: 5

Final positions
- Champions: FC Bayern Munich
- Runners-up: Fortuna Düsseldorf

Tournament statistics
- Matches played: 4
- Goals scored: 11 (2.75 per match)

The 1956–57 DFB-Pokal was the 14th season of the annual German football cup competition. It began on 4 August 1957 and ended on 29 December 1957. 4 teams competed in the tournament of two rounds. In the final Bayern Munich defeated Fortuna Düsseldorf 1–0, thereby winning their first title.

== Matches ==
=== Qualification round ===
4 August 1957

Spandauer SV	1 – 4	FC Bayern Munich
Schwedek 67'		Hahn 7', 45'; Velhorn 78'; Huber 80'

Sportplatz Neuendorfer Strasse
Attendance: 10,000
Referee: Erwin Sturm (Hanover)

=== Semi-finals ===
17 November 1957

FC Bayern Munich	3 – 1 (a.e.t.)	1. FC Saarbrücken
Velhorn 72'; Jobst 91'; Siedl 92'		Albert 30'

Stadion an der Grünwalder Strasse
Attendance: 24,000
Referee: Johannes Malka (Herten)
24 November 1957

Fortuna Düsseldorf	1 – 0	Hamburger SV
Janssen 2'

Niedersachsenstadion (Hannover)
Attendance: 15,000
Referee: Kurt Tschenscher (Mannheim)

=== Final ===
29 December 1957
14:00 CET

Fortuna Düsseldorf	0–1	Bayern Munich
	Report	Jobst 78'

Rosenaustadion, Augsburg
Attendance: 44,000
Referee: Albert Dusch (Kaiserslautern)
