= SC Preußen Münster =

German sports club

- Full name: Sportclub Preußen 1906 e.V. Münster
- Nickname: Die Adler (The Eagles)
- Founded: 30 April 1906; 120 years ago
- Ground: LVM-Preußenstadion
- Capacity: 15,000 (6,931 seated)
- Chairman: Christian Pander
- Coach: Thomas Wörle
- League: 3. Liga
- 2025–26: 2. Bundesliga, 18th of 18 (relegated)
- Website: scpreussen-muenster.de
Home colours	Away colours	Third colours

SC Preußen Münster (English: Prussia Münster) is a German sports club based in Münster, North Rhine-Westphalia which is mostly recognised for its football section. The football team currently plays in the 3. Liga which is the third tier in German football. Preußen Münster also fields teams in tennis, athletics, futsal, handball, fistball, darts and esports.

== History ==
The club was founded as FC Preußen on 30 April 1906 and has its roots in a group formed at the Johann-Conrad-Schlaun Grammar School. Historians consider patriotic reasons for naming the club after Prussia. At first the club did not have its own ground and was playing at a parade ground of the army at Loddenheide. General Baron von Bissing gave permission only if the goals would be taken down again after training. On 24 June 1907, the Eagles won their first game against FC Osnabrück with 5–0. After successfully applying for the Western German League system, the team initially competed in the second tier. In 1908 the Eagles were promoted to the first league and in 1914 they won the Westphalian Championship. Between 1916 and 1926 the club played on Münstermannplatz, which was close to the current ground, the Preußenstadion. In 1921, they won the Championship a second time and also took on their current name.

In 1933, Preußen advanced to the Gauliga Westfalen, one of sixteen top-flight leagues established through the re-organization of German football under the Third Reich. They earned only mediocre results there and were relegated twice. Their second demotion in 1941 left them out of first division football until after World War II.

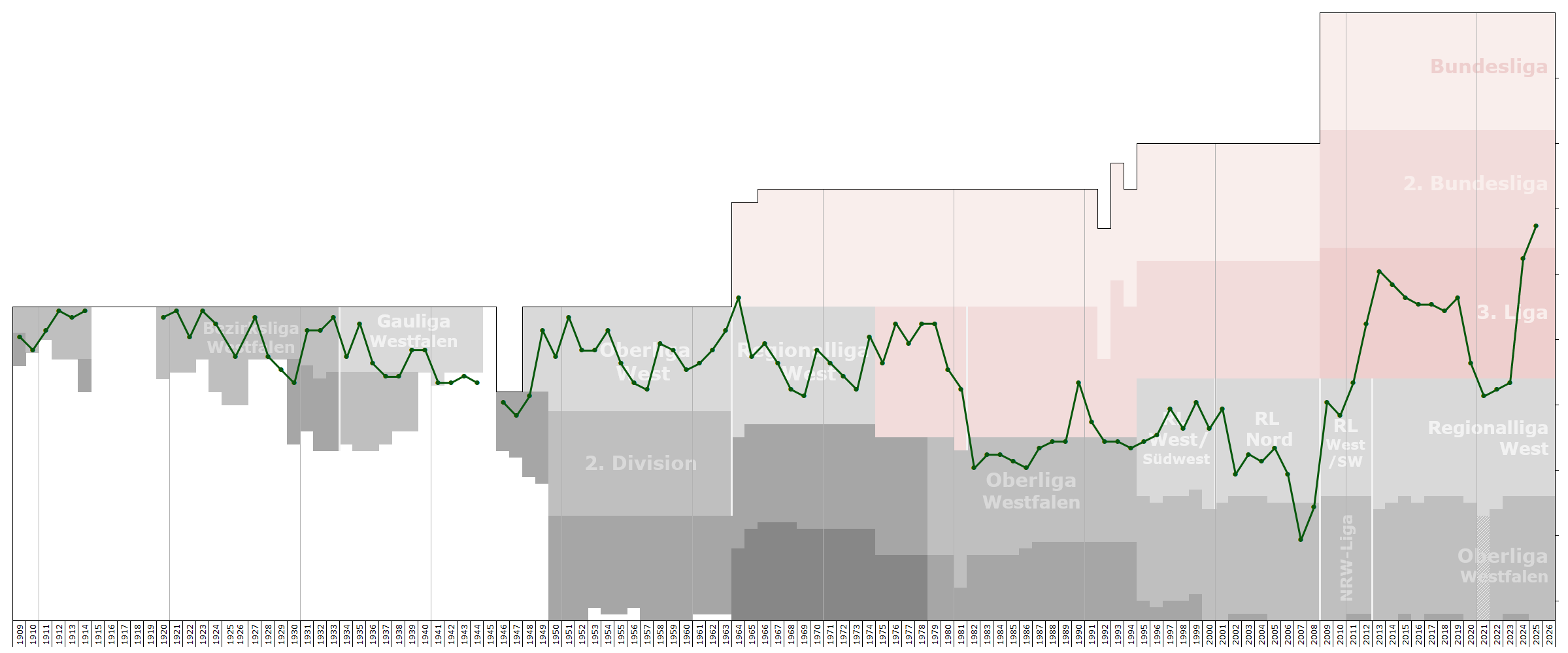
Historical chart of Preußen Münster league performance

The team played three seasons in the Landesliga Westfalen Gr. 2 (II) before returning to the top-flight in the Oberliga West in the 1948–49 season. That arrival was accompanied by some notoriety, as Preußen Münster became the first German football club to build a team by buying players, something previously unheard of in a country committed to the ideal of amateurism. Siegfried Rachuba, Adolf Preissler, Rudolf Schulz, Felix Gerritzen, and Josef Lammers formed a front five dubbed by the press as the "Hundred-Thousand-Mark Line", even though that much money never did change hands. Rachuba is still Münsters most successful first tier striker of all times with 97 goals in 238 games.

The investment paid dividends as the club appeared in the 1951 national final in front of 107,000 spectators at Berlin's Olympic Stadium against 1. FC Kaiserslautern. Preußen striker Gerritzen scored first but the team lost after two goals from Ottmar Walter.

=== Founding member of the Bundesliga ===
Their results as a mid-table side in the tough Oberliga West in the ten years prior to the formation of the Bundesliga in 1963 were good enough to earn Preußen Münster the admission as one of the five teams from that league to earn a place in Germany's new sixteen-team professional circuit. The club made only a cameo appearance in the Bundesliga, being relegated after a next-to-last 15th-place finish.

=== 1964–2006: Second and Third Division ===
Preußen Münster played out in the 1960s and 1970s as a second division side in the Regionalliga West and 2. Bundesliga Nord. In the 1970s the Preußen made several attempts to return to Bundesliga. Under club president Günter Wellerdieck (from 1970 to 1978) the club took a considerable financial risk to achieve the promotion to first tier. Preußen failed to do so by finishing on 5th place in the 1973–74 season and on 3rd place in the 1977–78 and 1978–79 seasons. After Wellerdieck and other staff of the club's management resigned due to financial difficulties and accusations of tax fraud in 1978, the decline of Preußen Münster continued. They slipped to the Amateur Oberliga Westfalen (III) in the 1981–82 season, and except for a short adventure in the 2. Bundesliga in the 1990 and 1991 seasons, played third-tier football in the Regionalliga West/Sudwest (1993–2000) and Regionalliga Nord until 2006. During this period, they captured the German Amateur Championship in 1994 with a 1–0 win over Kickers Offenbach.

=== 2006–2011: Fourth Division ===
In 2006, the club was relegated to the Oberliga Westfalen, now a fourth-tier circuit. Management subsequently invested significant financial resources into a high-profile team of experienced second- and third-tier players in pursuit of immediate re-promotion. The attempt ended in failure and the club re-built itself with young players in place of expensive veterans and also put in place a young and relatively unknown coach, Roger Schmidt. The re-worked side finished in first place in the 2007–08 season, and so qualified for the new Regionalliga West which replaced the Oberliga in the league system. They ended the season in fourth place in the Regionalliga in 2008–09, and in sixth in 2009–10. For season 2008–09 the club qualified for the DFB-Pokal the first time since season 1997–98 (where they were defeated by 1.FSV Mainz 05). The opponent was VfL Bochum which competed in Bundesliga at that time. After a penalty shootout Preußen lost 5–6. In the following year the Eagles were defeated in the extra time against another first tier team, Hertha BSC. The match ended 1–3.

=== 2011–present: 3. Liga and 2. Bundesliga ===
111-year anniversary logo used in 2017

They were finally promoted to 3. Liga after finishing as champions of the West Group of the Regionalliga in the 2010–11 season. The manager of that time was Marc Fascher. Preußen were defeated by another Bundesliga team in the German cup, VfL Wolfsburg (1–2). The first season 2011–12 in the third tier of German football after five years ended with a 12th place. In the following seasons the team finished significantly better and even had chances to get promoted again to 2. Bundesliga. In season 2012–13 they almost succeeded and ended in fourth place. In that season the team was also able to defeat the Bundesliga team Werder Bremen in the first round of the DFB-Pokal, 4–2 after extra time. In the second round, the club lost against Augsburg. In season 2013–14 they ended in sixth place. Again the club managed to win against a team from a higher league in the DFB-Pokal, St. Pauli from 2. Bundesliga. In the next round Preußen was defeated again by FC Augsburg.

In the 2014–15 season, the club had a promising start, and was even at the top of the league during winter. Unfortunately, the team was not able to keep up the good results and finished 8th. The season 2015–16 also started with good results, but again the team lost ground in the long run and finished ninth. During the season the club switched managers, from Ralf Loose to Horst Steffen. The following season brought big changes in the club administration. After changing the coach from Horst Steffen to the former SCP-player Benno Möhlmann several high-ranking positions in the club were also manned with new personalities. To serve as chairman Preußen Münster could win over Christoph Strässer, a former politician of the German Bundestag. Among others, the board of directors now contains Walther Seinsch who is well known in German football for his work with then fourth tier club Augsburg. Furthermore, with Friedrich Lucas the club's board now has a fans' representative for the first time in the history of Preußen Münster. In April 2017, Malte Metzelder manned the position of director of football. He is also a former player of the Eagles.

In 2017, Preußen Münster celebrated the club's 111th anniversary. In celebration, the club used a special anniversary logo in 2017. The logo contained the text "111 Jahre" (111 years) on top and "1906–2017" on the bottom, along with the club's usual Prussian eagle surrounded by a wreath. The club also gave away 111 litres of free beer to fans at the stadium.

At the end of the 2019–20 season, despite a switch of managers from Sven Hübscher to Sascha Hildmann in the winter break, the club was relegated to Regionalliga West again. Following the relegation Malte Metzelder resigned as director of football and was replaced by former Bundesliga player Peter Niemeyer. In the following three seasons the club rebuild itself. After a third place in season 2020–21 the Eagles came second in the 2021–22 season and were only three goals short of promotion. Finally in the following season they dominated the league and at the end of the season were promoted to return to 3. Liga. On the final matchday of the 2023–24 season, they achieved a 2–0 victory over Unterhaching, securing a second-place finish and promotion to the 2. Bundesliga for the first time since 1991.

After two promotions in a row, the club was not only fighting for survival in the 2. Bundesliga since the first matchday of the 2024/2025 season. The club had to upgrade its stadium infrastructure, which had not previously been in place, just in time for the start of the season. Specifically, goal-line technology, a VAR environment, and additional locations for TV cameras had to be created for the match and broadcast operations. In addition, measures for away fans had to be implemented on the main stand and the opposite stand. These costly infrastructure improvements were essential for the match operations in the 2. Bundesliga. A large part of the promotion team remained together in the second division. The contracts of captain Marc Lorenz and other veterans were extended in time. Additionally, the Preußen were able to attract several notable players, such as Jorrit Hendrix, Joshua Mees, and Mikkel Kirkeskov, to the Hammer Straße. However, the team had to pay a hefty price in terms of sports performance, especially at the start of the season. Despite some solid performances in the winter months, the team could never escape the relegation zone. At the end of the first half of the season, they managed to stay above the relegation line in 15th place. The second half of the season, however, proved just as challenging as the first. The team fought with direct rivals from Regensburg, Ulm, and Braunschweig for survival. After a defeat on Easter Sunday at 1. FC Köln and a draw at home against SV Darmstadt, the Münster team dropped to 17th place in the standings on matchday 31. As a result, the club made a drastic decision three matchdays before the end of the season and dismissed coach Sascha Hildmann and assistant coach Louis Cordes. The dismissal of the two-time promotion hero Hildmann sparked a heated debate within the club and the city. Supporters of the decision argued that it was overdue and even too late, while opponents highlighted Hildmann's achievements and the desire for continuity in the coaching position. The discussions ended as quickly as they had started. Under the interim management duo Christian Pander and Kieran Schulze-Marmeling, the team fought to a remarkable 0–5 victory at third-place Magdeburg. Following this, seven players from the Preußen made it into Kicker's Team of the Day. The team also won their next home game against Hertha BSC, so a draw on the final matchday at already-relegated SSV Ulm was enough to secure their place in the league. The season's goal of staying in the division was thus achieved.

For the new season the club announced to have signed Alexander Ende as the new coach. With him a new approach of football was played with more ball possession and short passes. In the first half of the season the performance was respectable and the club reached a 12th place until the winter break. Afterwards the results were poorer. The coach showed his inflexibility by not changing his now failing system. After a disastrous 0:6 loss against competitors in the race against relegation Dynamo Dresden on matchday 26, Ende got sacked and was replaced yet again by interim manager Schulze-Marmeling and after one game with coach veteran Alois Schwartz. He was not able to gain a single victory in the last fixtures of the season and the Eagles were subsequently relegated back to 3. Liga. For the new season the club signed Thomas Wörle as the new coach.

== Honours ==
The club's honours:

- German championship
  - Runners-up: 1951
- German amateur championship
  - Champions: 1994
- Regionalliga West (IV)
  - Champions: 2011, 2023
- Amateur Oberliga Westfalen (III)
  - Champions: 1988, 1989, 1992, 1993
- Westphalia Cup
  - Winner: 1997, 2008, 2009, 2010, 2014, 2021
  - Runners-up: 1987, 1998, 2012, 2022

== Players ==
=== Current squad ===
As of 3 September 2026

Note: Flags indicate national team as defined under FIFA eligibility rules; some limited exceptions apply. Players may hold more than one non-FIFA nationality.

No.	Pos.	Nation	Player
1	GK	GER	Morten Behrens
2	DF	GER	Louis Kolbe
3	DF	GER	Tim Dietrich
4	DF	CRO	Antonio Tikvić
5	DF	GER	Lucas Zeller
6	MF	GER	Wesley Adeh (on loan from Werder Bremen)
8	FW	GER	Joshua Mees
10	MF	GER	Marvin Schulz
11	FW	SWE	Oscar Vilhelmsson
14	MF	GER	Charalambos Makridis
15	DF	GER	Simon Scherder
16	DF	GER	Torge Paetow
17	MF	GER	Mika Stuhlmacher
19	MF	GER	Mikail Demirhan
20	FW	IRL	Ryan Johansson

No.	Pos.	Nation	Player
21	MF	GER	Rico Preißinger
23	FW	TUR	Malik Batmaz
24	DF	GER	Niko Koulis (captain)
25	DF	GER	Luca Bolay
26	MF	GER	Philipp Maier
27	MF	GER	Jakob Korte
28	FW	GER	Montell Ndikom
29	DF	MKD	Leon Tašov
30	MF	GER	Marvin Schulz
33	FW	GER	Felix Higl
36	DF	GER	Niklas Varelmann
38	GK	GER	Matthis Harsman
40	GK	GER	Paul Ervens
43	FW	GER	Romario Rösch
44	MF	GER	Samuel Althaus

=== Out on loan ===
Note: Flags indicate national team as defined under FIFA eligibility rules; some limited exceptions apply. Players may hold more than one non-FIFA nationality.

No.	Pos.	Nation	Player
—	GK	GER	Johannes Schenk (at Beveren until 30 June 2027)

== Coaching staff ==
Position	Staff
Head coach	(Germany) Thomas Wörle
Assistant coach	(Germany) Maximilian Knauer (Germany) Janis Hohenhövel
Assistant coach analysis	(Germany) Jonas Imkamp
Goalkeeping coach	(Germany) André Poggenborg
Athletic coach	(Germany) Tim Geidies
Managing director of sports	(Germany) Ole Kittner
Team manager	(Germany) Harald Menzel
Sporting director	(Germany) Jan Uphues
Physiotherapist	(Germany) Dennis Essmann (Germany) Dennis Sarteh
Rehabilitation trainer/Physiotherapist	(Germany) Matthias Balthasar
Team doctor	(Germany) Prof. Dr. Kristian Schneider (Germany) Dr. Tim Hartwig
Equipment manager	(Germany) Helge Dahms (Germany) Bastian Lake

== Manager history ==
- Season 1948–49 Rudolf Prokoph
- Season 1949–50 Willi Multhaup
- Season 1950–51 Willi Multhaup
- Season 1951–52 Willi Multhaup
- Season 1952–53 Willi Multhaup
- Season 1953–54 Ludwig Tretter
- Season 1954–55 Paul Böhm
- Season 1955–56 Paul Böhm
- Season 1956–57 Günter Hentschke
- Season 1957–58 Günter Hentschke
- Season 1958–59 Kuno Klötzer
- Season 1959–60 Kuno Klötzer
- Season 1960–61 Kuno Klötzer
- Season 1961–62 Richard Schneider
- Season 1962–63 Richard Schneider
- Season 1963–64 Richard Schneider
- Season 1964–65 Richard Schneider
- Season 1965–66 Richard Schneider
- Season 1966–67 Prvoslav Mihajlović
- Season 1967–68 Bert Trautmann
- Season 1968–69 Bert Trautmann – from 17 September 1968 Rudolf Schnippe – from 31 December 1968 Richard Schneider
- Season 1969–70 Richard Schneider – Dagmar Drewes
- Season 1970–71 Richard Schneider – Falk Dörr – from 11 December 1970 Alfred Schmidt
- Season 1971–72 Alfred Schmidt
- Season 1972–73 Slobodan Čendić
- Season 1973–74 Slobodan Čendić – from 18 March 1974 Bernd Kipp and Günter Wellerdieck
- Season 1974–75 Werner Olk – from 1. April 1975 afterwards Hans-Werner Moors (as caretaker manager)
- Season 1975–76 Detlev Brüggemann – until 21 August 1975, from 8 September 1975 Rudi Faßnacht
- Season 1976–77 Rudi Faßnacht – until 22 February 1977 then Günter Wellerdieck as caretaker manager – from 1 April 1977 Werner Biskup
- Season 1977–78 Werner Biskup
- Season 1978–79 Werner Biskup
- Season 1979–80 Werner Biskup
- Season 1980–81 Günter Exner – from 13 January 1981 Rudi Faßnacht
- Season 1981–82 Zoltán Varga – from 7 December 1981 Horst Blankenburg (as caretaker manager)
- Season 1982–83 Ernst Mareczek
- Season 1983–84 Ernst Mareczek
- Season 1984–85 Ernst Mareczek
- Season 1985–86 Günter Exner
- Season 1986–87 Helmut Horsch
- Season 1987–88 Helmut Horsch
- Season 1988–89 Helmut Horsch
- Season 1989–90 Elmar Müller – from 8 March 1990 Ernst Mareczek
- Season 1990–91 Gerd Roggensack – from 24 April 1991 Siegfried Melzig until 17 June 1991
- Season 1991–92 Hans-Werner Moors
- Season 1992–93 Hans-Werner Moors
- Season 1993–94 Hans-Werner Moors – from 9 May 1994 Ernst Mareczek
- Season 1994–95 Fritz Bischoff
- Season 1995–96 Bernd Kipp (15 August – 28 August 1995), afterwards Alfons Weusthoff
- Season 1996–97 Paul Linz (did not start working), afterwards Peter Vollmann
- Season 1997–98 Peter Vollmann
- Season 1998–99 Hans-Werner Moors
- Season 1999–00 Hans-Werner Moors (until 23 September 1999), Klaus Berge (until 2 November 1999), Stefan Grädler
- Season 2000–01 Stefan Grädler
- Season 2001–02 Stefan Grädler (until 16 December 2001) – from January Neale Marmon
- Season 2002–03 Neale Marmon (until 20 November 2002) – from December Peter Vollmann
- Season 2003–04 Peter Vollmann (until 10 November 2003), then Hans-Werner Moors
- Season 2004–05 Hans-Werner Moors
- Season 2005–06 Colin Bell (until 20 November 2005), then Stefan Grädler (as caretaker manager), from 19 December 2005 Hans-Werner Moors
- Season 2006–07 Georg Kreß – from 6 April 2007 Carsten Gockel (as caretaker manager)
- Season 2007–08 Roger Schmidt
- Season 2008–09 Roger Schmidt
- Season 2009–10 Roger Schmidt (until 19 March 2010), from 21 March 2010 Marc Fascher
- Season 2010–11 Marc Fascher
- Season 2011–12 Marc Fascher (until 23 January 2012), from 24 January 2012 Pavel Dochev. He is following Marc Fascher, who was fired the previous day for having differences with club management.
- Season 2012–13 Pavel Dochev
- Season 2013–14 Pavel Dochev until 5 September 2013. Carsten Gockel (as caretaker manager). From 15 September 2013 the new coach Ralf Loose takes over.
- Season 2014–15 Ralf Loose
- Season 2015–16 Ralf Loose until 19 December 2015, from 25 December 2015 Horst Steffen.
- Season 2016–17 Horst Steffen until 4 October 2016, from 15 October 2016 Benno Möhlmann.
- Season 2017–18 Benno Möhlmann until 10 December 2017, from 12 December 2017 Marco Antwerpen.
- Season 2018–19 Marco Antwerpen
- Season 2019–20 Sven Hübscher until 30 November 2019, from 1 December 2019 Arne Barez (as caretaker manager).
- From 27 December 2019 to 27 April 2025 Sascha Hildmann, from 28 April Kieran Schulze-Marmeling (as caretaker manager).
- From 1 July 2025 until 15 March 2026 Alexander Ende, from 16 March Kieran Schulze-Marmeling (as caretaker manager).
- From 16 March 2026 until the end of the season Alois Schwartz.
- Season 2026-27 Thomas Wörle

== Recent seasons ==
The recent season-by-season performance of the club:

Year	Division	Tier	Position
1999–00	Regionalliga West/Südwest	III	8th
2000–01	Regionalliga Nord	III	5th
2001–02	Regionalliga Nord	III	15th
2002–03	Regionalliga Nord	III	12th
2003–04	Regionalliga Nord	III	13th
2004–05	Regionalliga Nord	III	11th
2005–06	Regionalliga Nord	III	15th ↓
2006–07	Oberliga Westfalen	IV	6th
2007–08	Oberliga Westfalen	IV	1st ↑
2008–09	Regionalliga West	IV	4th
2009–10	Regionalliga West	IV	6th
2010–11	Regionalliga West	IV	1st ↑
2011–12	3. Liga	III	12th
2012–13	3. Liga	III	4th
2013–14	3. Liga	III	6th
2014–15	3. Liga	III	8th
2015–16	3. Liga	III	9th
2016–17	3. Liga	III	9th
2017–18	3. Liga	III	10th
2018–19	3. Liga	III	8th
2019–20	3. Liga	III	18th ↓
2020–21	Regionalliga West	IV	3rd
2021–22	Regionalliga West	IV	2nd
2022–23	Regionalliga West	IV	1st ↑
2023–24	3. Liga	III	2nd ↑
2024–25	2. Bundesliga	II	15th
2025–26	2. Bundesliga	II	18th ↓
2026–27	3. Liga		

↑ Promoted	↓ Relegated

== Stadium ==
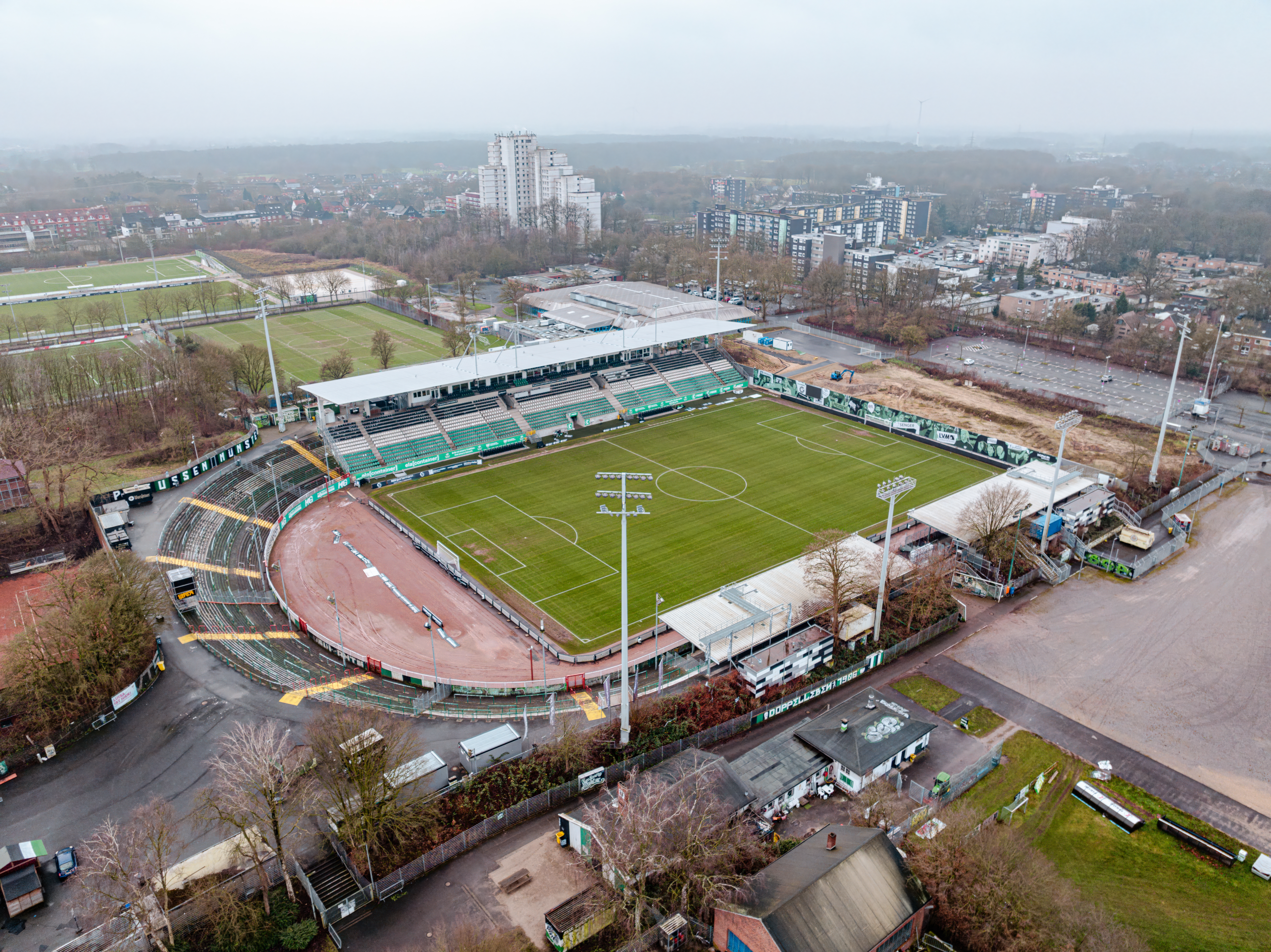
The Preußenstadion during redevelopment (2025)

The club plays at the Preußenstadion, which was built in 1926. Once considered one of the most modern stadiums in Germany, the arena slowly fell into disrepair which resulted in reducing the capacity from 40,000 in the 1950s to 15,000, and, after removing one stand, to the current 12,754.

Construction of a new facility was considered in the 80s, but the idea was abandoned in December 2000. In spring 2008 it was decided to renovate the Preußenstadion, to make the stadium more attractive and fitting to modern standards. The seating area was replaced by a new one including 2,931 seats and VIP lounges. Some of the terraces which were still uncovered got a roof. The works finished in May 2009.

Further plans have been brought up to continue to modernize the stadium and actions were taken in 2014 to change the development plan of the stadium area by the local administration. In December 2018 the local administration granted 40 million Euros to modernize the stadium, which was extended to 60 million in November 2022 and to 88 Million in 2024.

As a first step the western was torn down at the end of season 2021–22 to check the filling material underneath. It has been replaced by a noise barrier that shows a design with several former club legends on it.

On 16 September 2024 the city announced that the building company Hellmich was awarded the contract to rebuild the stands in the west, east and north. The rebuilding is planned to be finished at the end of 2027 with some outer works till spring of 2028.The final capacity will be 19.156.

The club also plans to erect two new buildings to have more space for the youth teams and the neighboring basketball club Uni Baskets Münster and volleyball club USC Münster.

Some improvements in the training facilities have already been made. In 2023 two new training pitches have been completed. In August 2025 the western stand was opened to the public adding 3.500 seats and 1.100 of standing room. Afterwards the demolition of the eastern stand followed. In time for the start of the 2026-27 season it will be opened with standing room for initially 6.900 people that will be extended to over 8.700 people when the northern stand is finished. After the end of the 2025-26 season the demolition of the last old stand, the northern stand was completed.

== Fans ==
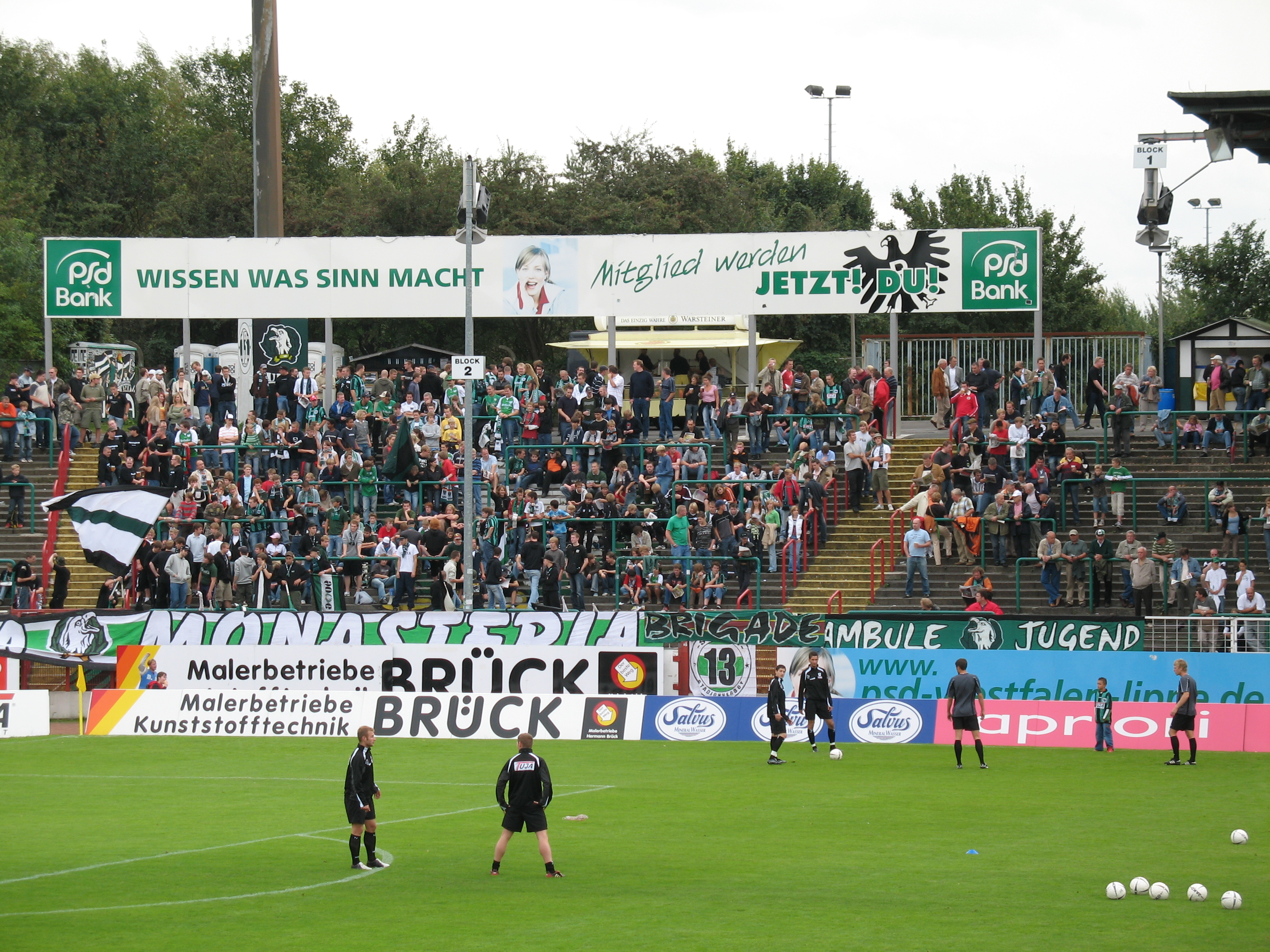
Preußen Münster fans in 2006

Due to the club's promotion from Regionalliga West to 3. Liga, average attendance significantly increased. During its years in fourth tier of the German league system, the average crowd never exceeded 4,500 fans, with the exception of the 2010–11 season, during which the club was promoted, with an average attendance of 5,628.

In the following years the average crowd grew from 7,025 people in 2011–12 season to 8,986 people in season 2012–13. In season 2013–14 there was a decrease to 7,958 people. The 2020s marked a new spike in the popularity of the club which showed in the average attendance. In the 2022–23 season, which ended in the promotion of the Eagles, the club had an average attendance of 8,752 in fourth tier which comes close to the highest number in third tier in 2012–13. In the 2023–24 season the number went up to 10,773. Due to the high ticket demand after being promoted to 2. Bundesliga the club capped the amount of season tickets for the 2023–24 season to 8.000.

The fans of Münster have rivalries especially with supporters of Arminia Bielefeld and VfL Osnabrück. The close proximity between the four cities which are located within a 65-kilometer radius led the press to the name of the Bermuda Triangle of Münster, Osnabrück and Bielefeld in 3. Liga. Another minor rival of Preußen Münster supporters is Rot Weiss Essen.

Preußen Münster has currently 15,000 members (in February 2026). Part of the club is the Fangemeinschaft Preußen Münster e. V. which serves as a voice for supporters to club management. It also arranges bus tours to matches and events to support charity organizations in the Münster-area. Furthermore, the Fanprojekt offers a radio during matches for people not present, Radio Mottekstrehle.
