= Werner Biskup =

German footballer (1942–2014)

Personal information
- Date of birth: 26 April 1942
- Place of birth: Bottrop, Germany
- Date of death: 22 June 2014 (aged 72)
- Position: Defender

Senior career*
Years	Team	Apps	(Gls)
1960–1962	VfB Bottrop		
1962–1965	Bayer Leverkusen		
1965–1968	Fortuna Düsseldorf		
1968–1972	1. FC Köln		
1972–1974	RFC Liège		

Managerial career
- 1975–1976: RFC Liège
- 1977–1980: Preußen Münster
- 1980–1981: VfL Osnabrück
- 1981–1983: Bayer Uerdingen
- 1983–1985: Hannover 96
- 1986: SV Arminia Hannover
- 1987: KSV Hessen Kassel
- 1988: Trabzonspor
- 1993–1994: VfL Osnabrück
- 2001: BV Cloppenburg
- * Club domestic league appearances and goals

Werner Biskup (26 April 1942 – 22 June 2014) was a German professional football player and manager, who played as a defender.
