= KFC Uerdingen 05 =

Association football club in Krefeld, Germany

- Full name: Krefelder Fußballclub; Uerdingen 05 e.V.
- Founded: 1905; 121 years ago
- Ground: Grotenburg-Stadion
- Capacity: 34,500
- Chairman: Christian Gummert
- Head coach: Jörn Nowak
- League: Oberliga Niederrhein (V)
- 2025–26: Oberliga Niederrhein, 3rd of 18
- Website: www.kfc-uerdingen.de
Home colours	Away colours	Third colours

KFC Uerdingen 05 is a German football club in the Uerdingen district of the city of Krefeld, North Rhine-Westphalia. The former Bundesliga side, which had its greatest successes in the 1980s, plays in the fifth-level Oberliga Niederrhein after withdrawing from their Regionalliga group in 2025.

== History ==
The club was founded on 17 November 1905 as Fußball-Club Uerdingen 05. On 1 August 1919, following World War I, FC was joined by Sportvereinigung des Realgymnasiums Uerdingen. During World War II from 1941 to 1945 the club played as part of the combined wartime side Kriegspiel-Gemeinschaft KSG Uerdingen alongside VfB 1910 Uerdingen (which was known from 1910 to 1919 as Sport-Club Preussen Uerdingen). That partnership continued after the war with the two clubs playing as Spielvereinigung Uerdingen 05. On 20 February 1948, VfB became independent again and in 1950 SpVgg resumed their original identity as FC Uerdingen 05.

In 1953, the club merged with the Werkssportgruppen Bayer AG Uerdingen, the local worker's sports club of the chemical giant Bayer AG, becoming FC Bayer 05 Uerdingen. Bayer withdrew its sponsorship of the football team in 1995 at which time the club took on the name Krefelder Fußball-Club Uerdingen 05. Bayer continues to support the non-footballing departments of the club as Sport-Club Bayer 05 Uerdingen.

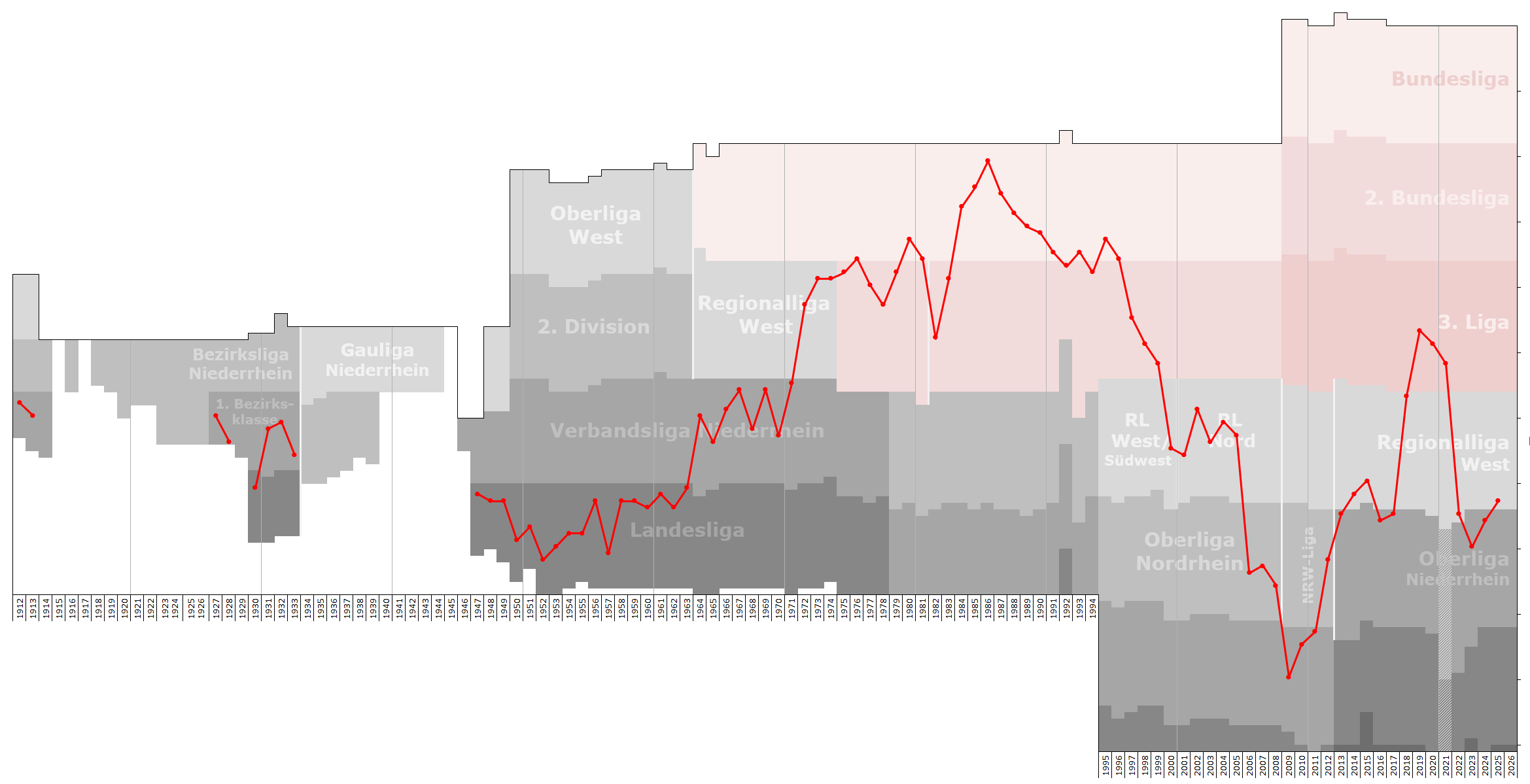
Historical chart of Uerdingen league performance

Uerdingen played in the amateur local leagues throughout their early history. By the early 1960s they had advanced as far as the Amateurliga Niederrhein (III) where they would play until 1971 when they stepped up into the Regionalliga West (II). The club then enjoyed a succession of strong finishes: a second-place result in 1974–75 earned them promotion to the top flight Bundesliga, where they finished last. After three seasons in the second tier 2. Bundesliga Nord, another second-place finish returned Uerdingen to the Bundesliga in 1979, this time for a two-year stay. The club would go on to enjoy its most successful years through the 1980s. They returned to the Bundesliga in 1983 and earned a best-ever third-place result there in 1986. Uerdingen also captured the DFB-Pokal (German Cup) in 1985 with a 2–1 victory over Bundesliga champions Bayern Munich in Berlin's Olympiastadion.

Legendary in the club's history from this time is their victory over Dynamo Dresden in the quarter-finals of the 1986 European Cup Winners Cup. Down 2–0 after the first leg away and behind 3–1 by half-time at home in the return leg, Uerdingen came storming back with six unanswered goals to win 7–3.

In 1987, Uerdingen also became the first club to win both the German under-19 and under-17 championship in the same season.

The team spent the first half of the 1990s as an "elevator crew" bouncing up and down between the Bundesliga and 2. Bundesliga. After the 1995 season Bayer withdrew its sponsorship of the football team which has suffered chronic financial difficulties ever since. Uerdingen took up their final year of play in the Bundesliga in the 1995–96 season as Krefelder Fußball-Club Uerdingen 05. By the turn of the millennium they had slipped through the second division and into third division play. The club's persistent financial problems led the DFB to deny them a license for play in the Regionalliga Nord (III) in 2003 despite a mid-table finish and they were relegated to the Oberliga Nordrhein (IV).

Veteran manager and Fortuna Düsseldorf legend Aleksandar Ristić was put in charge of the team as German football was reorganised with the introduction the new 3. Liga in 2008–09. KFC attempted to qualify for the restructured Regionalliga (IV), but failed in its attempt and was instead relegated to the Verbandsliga (VI) after finishing 13th.

In 2009, KFC has struggled with financial difficulties and its efforts to raise money included auctioning on eBay the right to coach the squad for one match and inviting childhood fan Pete Doherty to a league match.

In 2010–11, the club won the Verbandsliga and thus gained promotion to the NRW-Liga (V). It was the first promotion in 17 years. KFC finished 8th NRW-Liga and missed second consecutive promotion to Regionalliga West due to finishing behind VfB Hüls. After the disbanding of the NRW-Liga, KFC qualified for the Oberliga Niederrhein. It won a league championship at this level in 2013 and was promoted to the Regionalliga West but relegated back to the Oberliga again in 2015.

In 2017, Uerdingen won promotion to Regionalliga West and in 2018 after winning the playoff against Waldhof Mannheim won promotion to 3. Liga.

In January 2021, outgoing president Mikhail Ponomarev and his deputy Nicolas Weinhardt announced their departure from the club and shortly after, stated that due to financial losses caused mainly by the impact of the COVID-19 pandemic on association football and an unclear situation regarding the stadium in Krefeld, it had filed for insolvency. On 10 February 2021 the club was bought by Armenian business man and owner of the Noah Company, Roman Gevorkyan, who was also the owner of Armenian FC Noah, Latvian FC Noah Jūrmala and Italian A.C.N. Siena 1904.

In June 2021, due to financial insolvency, and the inability to meet the licensing requirements of the 3. Liga, KFC Uerdingen was relegated to the Regionalliga West. This led to Gevorkyan and the Noah Company withdrawing their engagements in the club, and all players were released by the club. In the 2021–22 season, Uerdingen suffered a second consecutive relegation to the Oberliga.

In 2024, the team won promotion back to the Regionalliga.

A new bankruptcy filing was submitted against the club by the tax agency on 13 January 2025, due to tax arrears. Three months later and during the regular season, the responsible liquidator informed all players and provided a press release containing the termination of all activity with immediate effect, unbeknown to the club's executive board. On 22 April 2025, the club released a statement referring to the release and announced legal action.

== Current squad ==
As of 10 September 2026

Note: Flags indicate national team as defined under FIFA eligibility rules; some limited exceptions apply. Players may hold more than one non-FIFA nationality.

No.	Pos.	Nation	Player
1	GK	GER	Jonas Holzum
4	DF	GER	Till Weingarten
5	DF	GER	Ole Päffgen
6	DF	GER	Louis Halfes-Meis
7	MF	GER	Alexander Lipinski
8	MF	GER	Dave Fotso Youmssi
9	FW	GER	Wladimir Wagner
10	MF	GER	Mario Knops
11	MF	GER	Luca Thissen
13	MF	GER	Vincent Shaub
14	MF	FIN	Joshua Salonen
17	FW	JPN	Daiki Kamo
18	FW	GER	Mustafa Doganci

No.	Pos.	Nation	Player
19	FW	GER	Dian Bilali
20	FW	JPN	Yuta Inoue
21	DF	GER	Jan Bachmann
22	FW	GER	Andrey Voronin
23	GK	GER	Marius Delker
25	MF	MKD	Maximilian Dimitrijevski
27	DF	GER	Justin Hoffmanns
30	GK	GER	Dominic Grehl
36	DF	GER	Tobias Grulke
40	DF	GER	Jesse Sierck
70	FW	GER	Ibrahim Nadir
99	FW	GER	Kaan Kocak

=== Former players ===
- (Australia) Chris Tadrosse

== Honours ==
=== Senior ===
- DFB-Pokal
  - Winners: 1984–85
- European Cup Winners' Cup
  - Semi-finalists: 1985–86
- 2. Bundesliga
  - Winners: 1991–92
- Regionalliga West
  - Winners: 2017–18
- Oberliga Niederrhein
  - Winners: 2012–13, 2016–17
- Verbandsliga Niederrhein
  - Winners: 2010–11
- Lower Rhine Cup
  - Winners: 2000–01, 2018–19
- Intertoto Cup
  - Winners: 1988–89, 1990–91, 1991–92, 1992–93

=== Youth ===
- German Under 19 championship
  - Winners: 1986–87
- German Under 17 championship
  - Winners: 1986–87

== Recent seasons ==
Year	Division	Tier	Position
1963–64	Verbandsliga Niederrhein	III	6th
1964–65	Verbandsliga Niederrhein	III	10th
1965–66	Verbandsliga Niederrhein	III	5th
1966–67	Verbandsliga Niederrhein	III	2nd
1967–68	Verbandsliga Niederrhein	III	8th
1968–69	Verbandsliga Niederrhein	III	2nd
1969–70	Verbandsliga Niederrhein	III	9th
1970–71	Verbandsliga Niederrhein	III	1st ↑
1971–72	Regionalliga West	II	7th
1972–73	Regionalliga West	II	3rd
1973–74	Regionalliga West	II	3rd
1974–75	2. Bundesliga	II	2nd ↑
1975–76	Bundesliga	I	18th ↓
1976–77	2. Bundesliga	II	4th
1977–78	2. Bundesliga	II	7th
1978–79	2. Bundesliga	II	2nd ↑
1979–80	Bundesliga	I	15th
1980–81	Bundesliga	I	18th ↓
1981–82	2. Bundesliga	II	12th
1982–83	2. Bundesliga	II	3rd ↑
1983–84	Bundesliga	I	10th
1984–85	Bundesliga	I	7th
1985–86	Bundesliga	I	3rd
1986–87	Bundesliga	I	8th
1987–88	Bundesliga	I	11th
1988–89	Bundesliga	I	13th
1989–90	Bundesliga	I	14th
1990–91	Bundesliga	I	17th ↓
1991–92	2. Bundesliga	II	1st ↑
1992–93	Bundesliga	I	17th ↓
1993–94	2. Bundesliga	II	2nd ↑
1994–95	Bundesliga	I	15th
1995–96	Bundesliga	I	18th ↓
1996–97	2. Bundesliga	II	9th
1997–98	2. Bundesliga	II	13th
1998–99	2. Bundesliga	II	16th ↓
1999–2000	Regionalliga	III	11th
2000–01	Regionalliga	III	12th
2001–02	Regionalliga	III	5th
2002–03	Regionalliga	III	10th
2003–04	Regionalliga	III	7th
2004–05	Regionalliga	III	9th ↓
2005–06	Oberliga Nordhein	IV	11th
2006–07	Oberliga Nordhein	IV	10th
2007–08	Oberliga Nordhein	IV	13th ↓
2008–09	Verbandsliga Niederrhein	VI	8th
2009–10	Verbandsliga Niederrhein	VI	3rd
2010–11	Verbandsliga Niederrhein	VI	1st ↑
2011–12	NRW-Liga	V	8th
2012–13	Oberliga Niederrhein	V	1st ↑
2013–14	Regionalliga West	IV	17th
2014–15	Regionalliga West	IV	15th ↓
2015–16	Oberliga Niederrhein	V	2nd
2016–17	Oberliga Niederrhein	V	1st ↑
2017–18	Regionalliga West	IV	1st ↑
2018–19	3. Liga	III	11th
2019–20	3. Liga	III	13th
2020–21	3. Liga	III	16th ↓
2021–22	Regionalliga West	IV	19th ↓
2022–23	Oberliga Niederrhein	V	6th
2023–24	Oberliga Niederrhein	V	3rd ↑
2024–25	Regionalliga West	IV	17th ↓
2025–26	Oberliga Niederrhein	V	3rd

== Managerial history ==
- 1 July 1970 – 30 June 1977 Klaus Quinkert
- 1 July 1977 – 30 June 1979 Siegfried Melzig
- 1 July 1979 – 30 June 1981 Horst Buhtz
- 1 July 1981 – 30 June 1983 Werner Biskup
- 1 July 1983 – 30 June 1984 Friedhelm Konietzka
- 1 July 1984 – 30 June 1987 Karl-Heinz Feldkamp
- 1 July 1987 – 12 January 1987 Horst Köppel
- 12 August 1987 – 30 June 1989 Rolf Schafstall
- 1 July 1989 – 25 November 1990 Horst Wohlers
- 26 November 1990 – 6 February 1991 Friedhelm Konietzka
- 6 March 1991 – 13 May 1996 Friedhelm Funkel
- 14 May 1996 – 30 June 1996 Armin Reutershahn
- 1 July 1996 – 30 June 1997 Hans-Ulrich Thomale
- 1 July 1997 – 29 September 1998 Jürgen Gelsdorf
- 30 September 1998 – 28 March 1999 Henk ten Cate
- 28 March 1999 – 30 June 1999 Ernst Middendorp
- 7 January 1999 – 31 October 1999 Herbert Schäty
- 11 January 1999 – 30 June 2000 Peter Vollmann
- 1 July 2000 – 30 June 2002 Jos Luhukay
- 1 July 2002 – 13 May 2004 Claus-Dieter Wollitz
- 1 July 2004 – 30 June 2006 Wolfgang Maes
- 1 July 2006 – 30 June 2007 Jürgen Luginger
- 1 July 2007 – 22 March 2008 Aleksandar Ristić
- 24 March 2008 – 30 June 2008 Klaus Berge
- 1 July 2008 – 8 November 2008 Richard Towa
- 8 November 2008 – 18 September 2009 Uwe Weidemann
- 18 September 2009 – 30 March 2010 Wolfgang Maes
- 31 March 2010 – 17 May 2010 Edgar Schmitt
- 10 June 2010 – 5 November 2011 Peter Wongrowitz
- 15 November 2011 – 24 May 2012 Jörg Jung
- 26 May 2012 – 31 June 2012 Erhan Albayrak & Ronny Kockel
- 1 July 2012 – 28 March 2014 Eric van der Luer
- 28 March 2014 – 14 April 2014 Erhan Albayrak
- 14 April 2014 – 22 April 2014 Ersan Tekkan
- 22 April 2014 – 18 May 2015 Murat Salar
- 18 May 2015 – 23 June 2015 Horst Riege
- 23 June 2015 – 2 March 2016 Michael Boris
- 2 March 2016 – 21 March 2016 Gerd Gotsche & Horst Riege
- 21 March 2016 – 20 May 2016 Jörn Großkopf
- 20 May 2016 – 30 May 2017 André Pawlak
- 1 July 2017 – 15 March 2018 Michael Wiesinger
- 15 March 2018 – 28 January 2019 Stefan Krämer
- 31 January 2019 – 3 February 2019 Stefan Reisinger
- 3 February 2019 – 15 March 2019 Norbert Meier
- 16 March 2019 – 30 April 2019 Frank Heinemann
- 30 April 2019 – 25 September 2019 Heiko Vogel
- 25 September 2019 – 16 October 2019 Stefan Reisinger
- 16 October 2019 – 10 March 2020 Daniel Steuernagel
- 10 March 2020 – 13 April 2021 Stefan Krämer
- 13 April 2021 – 30 June 2021 Jürgen Press & Stefan Reisinger
- 1 August 2021 – 2 November 2021 Dmitri Voronov
- 8 November 2021 – 28 November 2022 Alexander Voigt
- 9 December 2022 – 20 March 2023 Björn Joppe
- 20 March 2023 – 30 June 2023 Dmitri Voronov
- 1 July 2023 – 26 February 2024 Marcus John
- 26 February 2024 – 30 June 2024 Levan Kenia
- 18 July 2024 – 30 June 2025 René Lewejohann
- 1 July 2025 – 21 September 2026 Julian Stöhr
- 22 September 2026 – 15 November 2026 Christian Höfer
- 16 November 2026 – present Jörn Nowak
