= René Lewejohann =

German football manager (born 1984)

Personal information
- Date of birth: 13 February 1984 (age 42)
- Place of birth: Herne, West Germany
- Height: 1.87 m (6 ft 2 in)
- Position: Forward

Team information
- Current team: 1. FC Bocholt (manager)

Youth career
- Westfalia Herne
- –2003: VfL Bochum

Senior career*
Years	Team	Apps	(Gls)
2003–2005	LR Ahlen	7	(0)
2005–2007	Schalke 04 II	51	(13)
2007–2008	SV Wilhelmshaven	2	(0)
2008	Alemannia Aachen II	2	(0)
2008–2009	Westfalia Herne	12	(1)
2009–2010	Bonner SC	23	(6)
2010	SV Meppen	6	(0)
2010–2011	Westfalia Herne	33	(10)
2011–2013	Sportfreunde Siegen	58	(13)
2013–2015	1. FC Kaan-Marienborn	58	(13)
2015	DSC Wanne-Eickel	10	(2)
2015	BV Herne-Süd	15	(4)
2016	BV Herne-Süd	16	(5)
Total		293	(54)

Managerial career
- 2017: FSV Duisburg (assistant)
- 2017–2018: FSV Duisburg
- 2018: SpVgg Erkenschwick
- 2018–2020: Hammer SpVg
- 2023: Rot Weiss Ahlen (assistant)
- 2024–2025: KFC Uerdingen 05
- 2025: Rot Weiss Ahlen
- 2026–: 1. FC Bocholt
- * Club domestic league appearances and goals

René Lewejohann (born 13 February 1984) is a German football manager and former player who is the manager of Regionalliga West club 1. FC Bocholt.

== Playing career ==
Lewejohann played in youth for SC Westfalia Herne and VfL Bochum, with whom he reached the semi-finals of the German A-Youth Championship in the 2002–03 season. He began his professional career with LR Ahlen, and made his professional debut for the club on 21 September 2003 as a substitute for Christian Mikolajczak in a 3–1 defeat to FSV Mainz 05 in the 2. Bundesliga. Since then, he only made seven appearances with LR Ahlen in two years

He left Ahlen in 2005 and spent two years playing for Schalke 04's reserve team. There he became a regular player, playing 51 league games for the club and scoring 13 goals. During this time, however, he also contracted two metatarsal fractures within six months. After two years at Schalke, he left the team and signed with SV Wilhelmshaven and later the second team of Alemannia Aachen in the 2007–08 season, but was hardly used due to injuries.

For the 2008–09 season he returned to his home club, Westfalia Herne, which he left again during the winter break to play for Bonner SC. However, since he was rarely used there, he moved to SV Meppen in January 2010. He played there for half a year and returned to Westfalia Herne in the summer.

Lewejohann signed a two-year contract with the NRW-Liga team Sportfreunde Siegen in May 2011, with which he made the leap into the Regionalliga West in the 2011–12 season. In June 2013 he left the Sportfreunde and joined the 1. FC Kaan-Marienborn. After only a few appearances, Lewejohann got injures again and was out until the end of the season. In January 2015, he moved to DSC Wanne-Eickel and in August 2015 Lewejohann went to BV Herne-Süd in the Bezirksliga.

== Coaching career ==
In January 2016 Lewejohann went to Australia for a few months together with former footballers, Kerim Baba and Max Korell, to gain initial coaching experience. He supervised the youth teams of Sydney FC and was to teach German training philosophy on behalf of the Australian Football Academy. Lewejohann also worked for an international German school in Sydney. He returned to Germany in the summer 2016 and returned playing with BV Herne-Süd.

In March 2017, he became assistant coach of Denis Tahirović at FSV Duisburg. At the start of the 2017–18 season, he took over the head coaching post from Tahirović. On 16 January 2018 Lewejohann resigned at the FSV Duisburg. In January and June 2019, Lewejohann also played two games for FC Schalke 04's oldboys team.

A month later, SpVgg Erkenschwick hired him as their new head coach. In November 2018, he moved to Hammer SpVg as a head coach. On 28 January 2020, he was released from his duties.

In March 2023, he was appointed assistant manager of Rot Weiss Ahlen, serving under head coach Markus Kaya. At the conclusion of the season, both his contract and that of Kaya were not renewed by the club.

On 18 July 2024, Lewejohann was appointed manager of KFC Uerdingen 05.

On 1 October 2025, he returned to Rot Weiss Ahlen, this time as head coach, signing a contract running until 30 June 2026.

He became the manager of 1. FC Bocholt on 1 January 2026 on a contract running until 2028.
