= Jörg Jung =

German footballer and manager

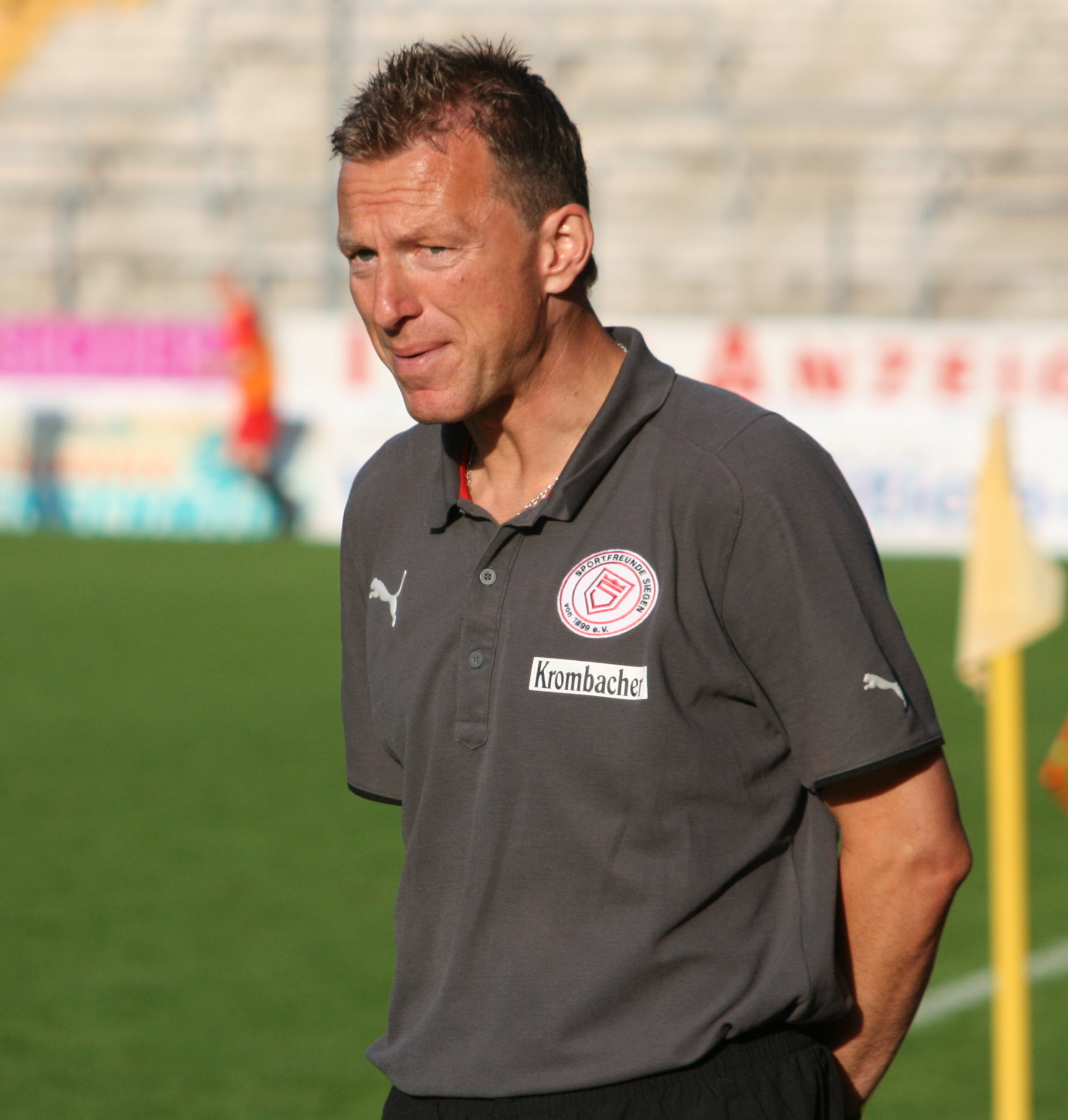

Personal information
- Full name: Jörg Jung
- Date of birth: 22 November 1965 (age 60)
- Place of birth: Mönchengladbach, West Germany
- Height: 1.90 m (6 ft 3 in)
- Position: Defender

Youth career
- Rheydter SV

Senior career*
| Years | Team | Apps | (Gls) |
| 1985–1987 | Borussia Mönchengladbach | 1 | (0) |
| 1987–1988 | SC Freiburg | 8 | (0) |
| 1988–1992 | Rheydter SV | | |
| 1992–1993 | Alemannia Aachen | 22 | (2) |
| 1993–1995 | SC Jülich 1910 | | |

Managerial career
- 1997–1998: SuS 09 Dinslaken
- 1998–1999: Schwarz-Weiß Essen
- 2002–2003: GFC 09 Düren
- 2003: SV Straelen
- 2005–2008: GFC 09 Düren
- 2008–2009: Wuppertaler SV Borussia (assistant)
- 2009: Wuppertaler SV Borussia (youth)
- 2009: Sportfreunde Siegen
- 2011–2012: KFC Uerdingen 05
- 2012: Wuppertaler SV Borussia (caretaker)
- * Club domestic league appearances and goals

Jörg Jung (born 22 November 1965, in Mönchengladbach) is a German former professional football player and manager. He was most recently the manager of KFC Uerdingen 05.

He most notably played at Borussia Mönchengladbach and SC Freiburg.

He has managed SuS 09 Dinslaken, Schwarz-Weiß Essen, GFC 09 Düren, SV Straelen, Sportfreunde Siegen, and KFC Uerdingen 05.
