= Klaus Berge =

German footballer and manager

Personal information
- Full name: Klaus Berge
- Date of birth: 4 October 1961 (age 65)
- Place of birth: Recklinghausen, West Germany
- Height: 1.83 m (6 ft 0 in)
- Position: Midfielder

Senior career*
Years	Team	Apps	(Gls)
1983–1985	FC Schalke 04	34	(2)
1985–1987	1. FC Saarbrücken	41	(2)
1987–1988	FC Schalke 04	2	(0)

Managerial career
- 1997–1998: LR Ahlen
- 1999: Preußen Münster
- 1999–2001: Rot-Weiss Essen
- 2004–2007: 1. FC Kleve
- 2008: KFC Uerdingen 05
- 2008–2009: Schwarz-Weiß Essen
- 2010–2012: DSC Wanne-Eickel
- * Club domestic league appearances and goals

Klaus Berge (born 4 October 1961) is a former German football player and current manager who last managed DSC Wanne-Eickel.

As player he most notably played for FC Schalke 04 and 1. FC Saarbrücken.

In 1997, he started his managerial career at LR Ahlen. In March 2008 he replaced Aleksandar Ristić in KFC Uerdingen 05 with the goal of saving the club from relegation. He did not succeed and left the club because he got a better offer at Schwarz-Weiß Essen.
