= Horst Riege =

German footballer and manager

Personal information
- Full name: Horst Riege
- Date of birth: 27 April 1953 (age 73)
- Place of birth: Essen, West Germany
- Height: 1.79 m (5 ft 10 in)
- Positions: Defender; midfielder

Team information
- Current team: KFC Uerdingen 05 (Director of Sports)

Youth career
- MSV Duisburg

Senior career*
| Years | Team | Apps | (Gls) |
| 1971–1978 | Bayer 05 Uerdingen | 115 | (16) |
| 1978–1979 | 1. FC Viersen | | |
| 1979–1980 | 1. FC Bocholt | | |
| 1980–1983 | TuS Xanten | | |

Managerial career
- 1992–1996: Preussen Krefeld
- 1997–1999: SC Schiefbahn
- 2001–2002: 1. FC Kleve
- 2002: Rheydter SV
- 2007–2008: GSV Moers
- 2010–2014: SV Sonsbeck
- 2015: KFC Uerdingen 05
- 2016: KFC Uerdingen 05 (caretaker)
- * Club domestic league appearances and goals

Horst Riege (born 27 April 1953) is a former German football player and manager. He is currently Director of Sports at KFC Uerdingen 05.

He most notably played at Bayer 05 Uerdingen.
