= Denis Tahirović =

Croatian footballer and manager

Personal information
- Date of birth: 16 July 1985 (age 41)
- Height: 1.76 m (5 ft 9 in)
- Position: Midfielder

Youth career
- SG Wattenscheid

Senior career*
Years	Team	Apps	(Gls)
2007	Schalke 04 II	7	(1)
2007	Primorje	10	(1)
2008	Virovitica		
2008–2009	Barcsi		
2009	Sloboda Tuzla	0	(0)
2010	Gradina Srebrenik		

Managerial career
- 2011–2013: SG Wattenscheid (U19)
- 2013–2015: FC Kray (assistant)
- 2014: FC Kray (interim)
- 2016: SSVg Velbert (assistant)
- 2016–2017: FSV Duisburg
- 2018: FSV Duisburg (interim)
- * Club domestic league appearances and goals

Denis Tahirović (born 16 July 1985) is a Croatian football manager and former player.

== Playing career ==
Tahirović played for SG Wattenscheid 09 as a youth player where he at a very young age began as a youth coach at the club. He then moved to FC Schalke 04, where he played for the reserve team and also was a youth coach for the club's U12 team. Tahirović was also the person who took German international player, Leroy Sané, to Schalke and was his coach at the club.

For the 2007–08 season he moved to NK Primorje, where he made ten appearances in the Slovenian PrvaLiga and scored one goal. In the second half of the 2007–08 season, he played for the Croatian club NK Virovitica, which he left after half a year to join Barcsi SC. He left this club in summer 2009 to play for the Bosnian club FK Sloboda Tuzla and later NK Gradina Srebrenik in the 2009–10 season.

== Coaching career ==
Tahirović later returned to Germany to work as a coach in the amateur sector. He was the U19 head coach of SG Wattenscheid 09 from 2011 to 2013. In November 2013, he became the assistant coach of FC Kray. On 18 May 2014, he was appointed interim head coach for the rest of the season, where Michael Lorenz was appointed new head coach. He left the club alongside Lorenz on 27 July 2015 due to professional and personal reasons.

On 9 April 2016, Tahirović became Michael Lorenz' - who he also worked under at FC Kray - assistant coach at SSVg Velbert. However, already one month later, the duo was released.

Tahirović was then appointed head coach of FSV Duisburg on 19 September 2016. On 4 August 2017, he decided to step back from the position. However, he returned to the club on 1 January 2017, however, as a sporting director. After René Lewejohann was fired in mid-January 2018, Tahirović took charge of the team until the end of the season and secured promotion to the Oberliga. He then continued his duties as a sporting director at the end of the season.
