= Rot Weiss Ahlen =

German football club

- Full name: Rot Weiss Ahlen e. V.
- Founded: 1996
- Ground: Wersestadion, Ahlen
- Capacity: 12,500
- Chairman: Dietmar Kupfernagel
- Manager: Marcel Stöppel
- League: Westfalenliga 1 (VI)
- 2025–26: Oberliga Westfalen (V), 17th of 19 (relegated)
- Website: www.rwahlen.de
Home colours	Away colours

Rot Weiss Ahlen is a German football club based in Ahlen, North Rhine-Westphalia. Until 2006 the club was known as LR Ahlen for its major sponsor, but underwent a name change when the sponsor withdrew its support after the team was relegated to the Regionalliga (III) in that year.

== History ==
The club has its roots in the local sides of the early 1900s formed by coalminers who played pickup games after work. In 1917, Freie Sportclub Union (FSCU) Ahlen was founded and became one of the region's best known teams, playing in the second-tier leagues of the time. The rise of the Third Reich saw the club disbanded as over three-quarters of its members were foreigners making the side politically unpalatable to the regime. A new club, Tus Germania Ahlen, was formed in 1933. This side merged with the strong local club Wacker Ahlen to create the town's largest sports association.

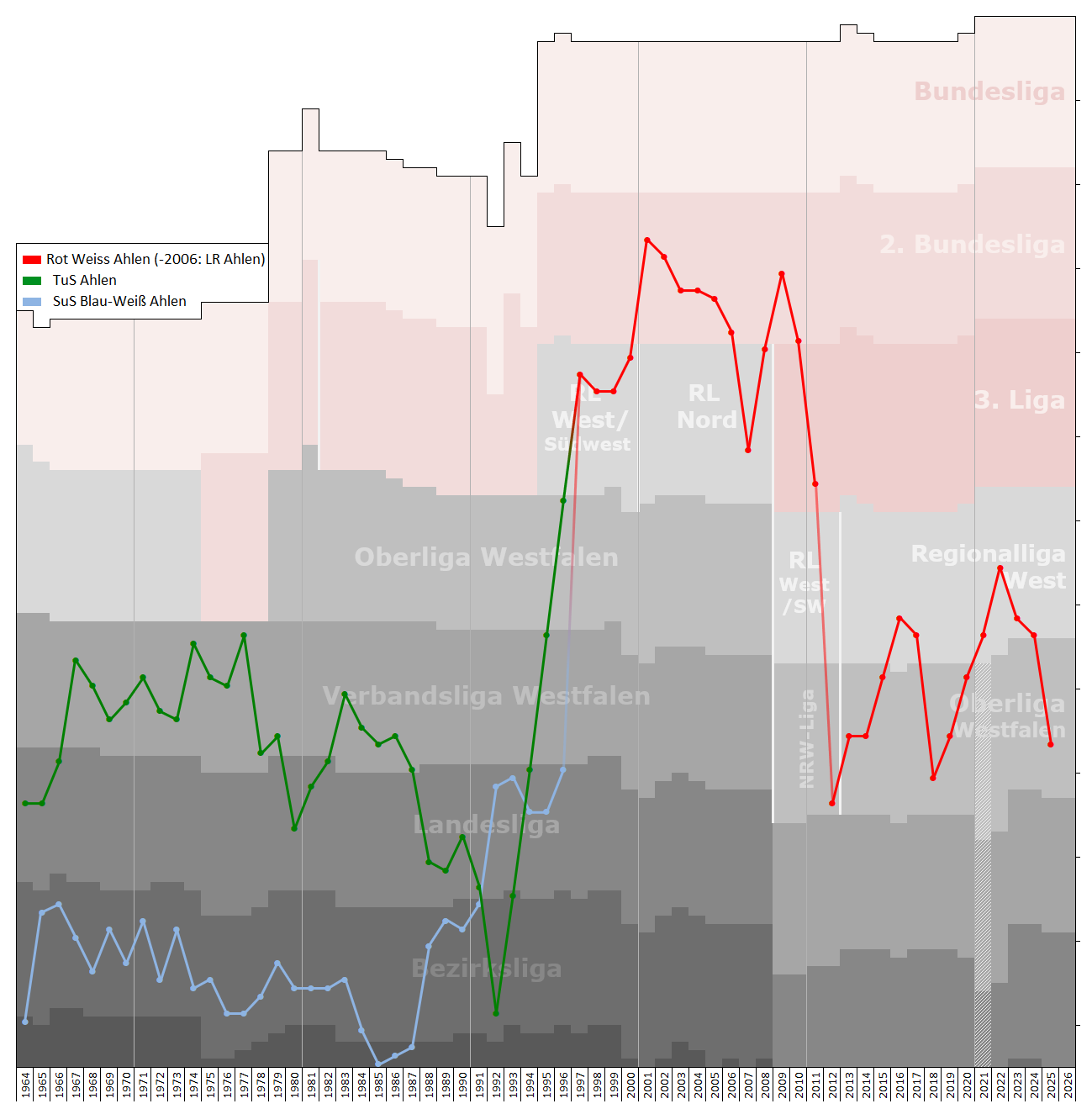
Historical chart of Rot Weiss Ahlen league performance

After World War II attempts to rebuild local teams failed until members of eight pre-war clubs came together to form Turn- und Sport Ahlen in 1948. The new side went on to many decades of routine play in the local upper leagues. In 1991, TuS were faced with a financial crisis and demotion to lower level play. A local benefactor, Helmut Spikker, helped bail the team out through the support provided by his firm, cosmetics manufacturer LR International.

Now on a firm footing, TuS Ahlen enjoyed an impressive run of success through the early 90s beginning with a Bezirksliga Westfalen (VII) title in 1992 and promotion to the Landesliga Westfalen (VI). In each of the following three seasons TuS earned another championship and promotion; out of the Landesliga, through the Verbandsliga Westfalen-Nordost (V) and Oberliga Westfalen (IV), leading to the Regionalliga West/Südwest (III).

Leichtathletik Rasensport Ahlen was formed on 1 June 1996 when TuS Ahlen merged with Blau-Weiß Ahlen to begin play in the Regionalliga West/Südwest in 1996–97. The club's rise was stalled and they made a bid to again move up by signing a number of players with Bundesliga experience for 1998–99. However, they could only manage a sixth-place finish and subsequently unloaded their expensive talent. Living more within their means, the side earned promotion with a second-place result in 1999–2000 and a 2–1 victory over 1. FC Union Berlin in the playoff round to advance to the 2. Bundesliga. Ahlen's best result came in their debut in the second tier when they ended sixth. The team slipped to become a lower-tier side and lingered for another five seasons before a 17th-place result led to their demotion in 2006.

After being relegated LR Ahlen lost the support of its major sponsor and underwent a name change to become Rot Weiss Ahlen on 31 May 2006. Chairman Spikker also left the club at the end of August with his successor being vice-president Heinz-Jürgen Gosda. The team returned to 2. Bundesliga play after finishing as champions of the Regionalliga Nord in 2007–08. With the end of the 2009–10 season, Ahlen was relegated to the 3. Liga, and the following year to the fifth NRW-Liga despite a 17th-place finish outside the drop down zone because of insolvency.

In 2020 the club finished second in the Oberliga Westfalen to win promotion to the Regionalliga West.

== Recent seasons ==
Year	Division	Position
1999–2000	Regionalliga West/Südwest (III)	2nd (promoted)
2000–01	2. Bundesliga (II)	6th
2001–02	2. Bundesliga	8th
2002–03	2. Bundesliga	12th
2003–04	2. Bundesliga	12th
2004–05	2. Bundesliga	13th
2005–06	2. Bundesliga	17th (relegated)
2006–07	Regionalliga Nord (III)	13th
2007–08	Regionalliga Nord	1st (promoted)
2008–09	2. Bundesliga (II)	10th
2009–10	2. Bundesliga	18th (relegated)
2010–11	3. Liga	20th (original 17th; relegated due to insolvency)
2011–12	NRW-Liga (V)	17th
2012–13	Oberliga Westfalen	9th
2013–14	Oberliga Westfalen	9th
2014–15	Oberliga Westfalen	2nd (promoted)
2015–16	Regionalliga West (IV)	13th
2016–17	Regionalliga West	15th (relegated)
2017–18	Oberliga Westfalen (V)	14th
2018–19	Oberliga Westfalen	9th
2019–20	Oberliga Westfalen	2nd (promoted)
2020–21	Regionalliga West (IV)	18th
2021–22	Regionalliga West (IV)	10th
2022–23	Regionalliga West (IV)	16th

== Honours ==
The club's honours:

- Regionalliga Nord
  - Champions: 2008
- Oberliga Westfalen
  - Champions: 1996, 2019
  - Runners-up: 2015, 2020
- Verbandsliga Westfalen Nordost
  - Champions: 1995
- Landesliga Westfalen
  - Champions: 1994
- Bezirksliga Westfalen
  - Champions: 1993

== Current squad ==
As of 22 August, 2024

Note: Flags indicate national team as defined under FIFA eligibility rules; some limited exceptions apply. Players may hold more than one non-FIFA nationality.

No.	Pos.	Nation	Player
1	GK	GER	Luis Ackermann
2	DF	GER	Tim Breuer
4	DF	GER	Patrick Polk
5	DF	GER	Denzel Tawiah
6	MF	GER	Fabian Holthaus
7	FW	GER	Emro Curic
8	MF	GER	Tobias Herring
9	FW	TUR	Bahattin Köse
10	FW	GER	Hakan Sezer
11	DF	GER	Emmanuel De Lemos
12	GK	GER	Lukas Krekeler

No.	Pos.	Nation	Player
14	DF	BRA	Bruno Soares
15	DF	GER	Mika Kruphölter
16	DF	GER	Edon Rizaj
17	MF	GER	Enes Sali
19	MF	GER	Mike Pihl
21	MF	GER	Noyan Bayaki
22	DF	GER	Kilian Hornbruch
23	MF	GER	Murat Keskinkilic
26	MF	GER	Luka Tankulic
27	FW	GER	Davin Wöstmann
28	MF	SYR	Can Moustfa

== Former managers ==
- 1992 – 30 June 1996 Joachim Krug
- 1 July 1996 – 18 August 1997 Wolfgang Sandhowe
- 19 August 1997 – 13 October 1998 Klaus Berge
- 14 October 1998 – 11 September 2000 Franz-Josef Tenhagen
- 20 September 2000 – 27 November 2001 Peter Neururer
- 30 November 2001 – 24 November 2002 Uwe Rapolder
- 25 November 2002 – 2 January 2003 Uwe Fuchs
- 3 January 2003 – 25 May 2003 Werner Lorant
- 3 August 2003 – 14 November 2003 Stefan Kuntz
- 24 November 2003 – 1 March 2005 Ingo Peter
- 7 March 2005 – 25 October 2005 František Straka
- 26 October 2005 – 14 May 2006 Paul Linz
- 15 May 2006 – 29 October 2006 Bernard Dietz
- 30 October 2006 – 30 June 2007 Heiko Bonan
- 1 July 2007 – 3 March 2009 Christian Wück
- 3 March 2009 – 16 April 2009 Bernd Heemsoth
- 16 April 2009 – 20 September 2009 Stefan Emmerling
- 20 September 2009 – 14 October 2009 Andreas Zimmermann
- 14 October 2009 – 30 June 2010 Christian Hock
- 1 July 2010 – 30 June 2011 Arie van Lent
- 1 July 2011 – 15 November 2011 Thomas Berndsen
- 21 November 2011 – 2 April 2012 Joachim Krug
- 5 April 2012 – 30 June 2012 Peter Feldkötter
- 1 July 2013 – 30 June 2013 Marco Antwerpen
- 1 July 2013 – 14 April 2014 Carlos Castilla
- 14 April 2014 – 18 May 2016 Marco Antwerpen
- 1 July 2016 – 17 October 2016 Mircea Onisemiuc
- 17 October 2016 – 24 October 2016 André Kruphölter
- 24 October 2016 – 15 December 2017 Erhan Albayrak
- 4 January 2018 – 13 September 2018 Michael Schrank
- 10 October 2018 – 30 June 2020 Christian Britscho
- 1 July 2020 – 16 November 2020 Björn Mehnert
- 16 November 2020 – 29 November 2022 Andreas Zimmermann
- 1 December 2022 – 6 March 2023 Andreas Golombek
- 6 March 2023 – 30 June 2023 Markus Kaya
- 1 July 2023 – 18 October 2023 Daniel Berlinski
- 24 October 2023 – 3 March 2025 Björn Joppe
- 3 March 2025 – 22 September 2025 Luka Tankulic
- 1 October 2025 – 31 December 2025 René Lewejohann
- 1 January 2026 – Present Marcel Stöppel
