= Horst Witzler =

German football manager (1932–2026)

Personal information
- Date of birth: 18 August 1932
- Date of death: 2 January 2026 (aged 93)

Managerial career
- Years: Team
- 1961–1964: SV Meppen
- 1965–1966: SV Arminia Hannover
- 1966–1970: Schwarz-Weiß Essen
- 1970–1971: Borussia Dortmund
- 1972–1973: Rot-Weiss Essen
- 1974: 1. FC Mülheim
- 1974–1976: Alemannia Aachen
- 1980: SC Herford
- 1980: Eupen
- 1985–1987: Eupen

Horst Witzler (18 August 1932 – 2 January 2026) was a German football manager. He died on 2 January 2026, at the age of 93.
