= Mike Terranova =

Italo-German footballer (born 1976)

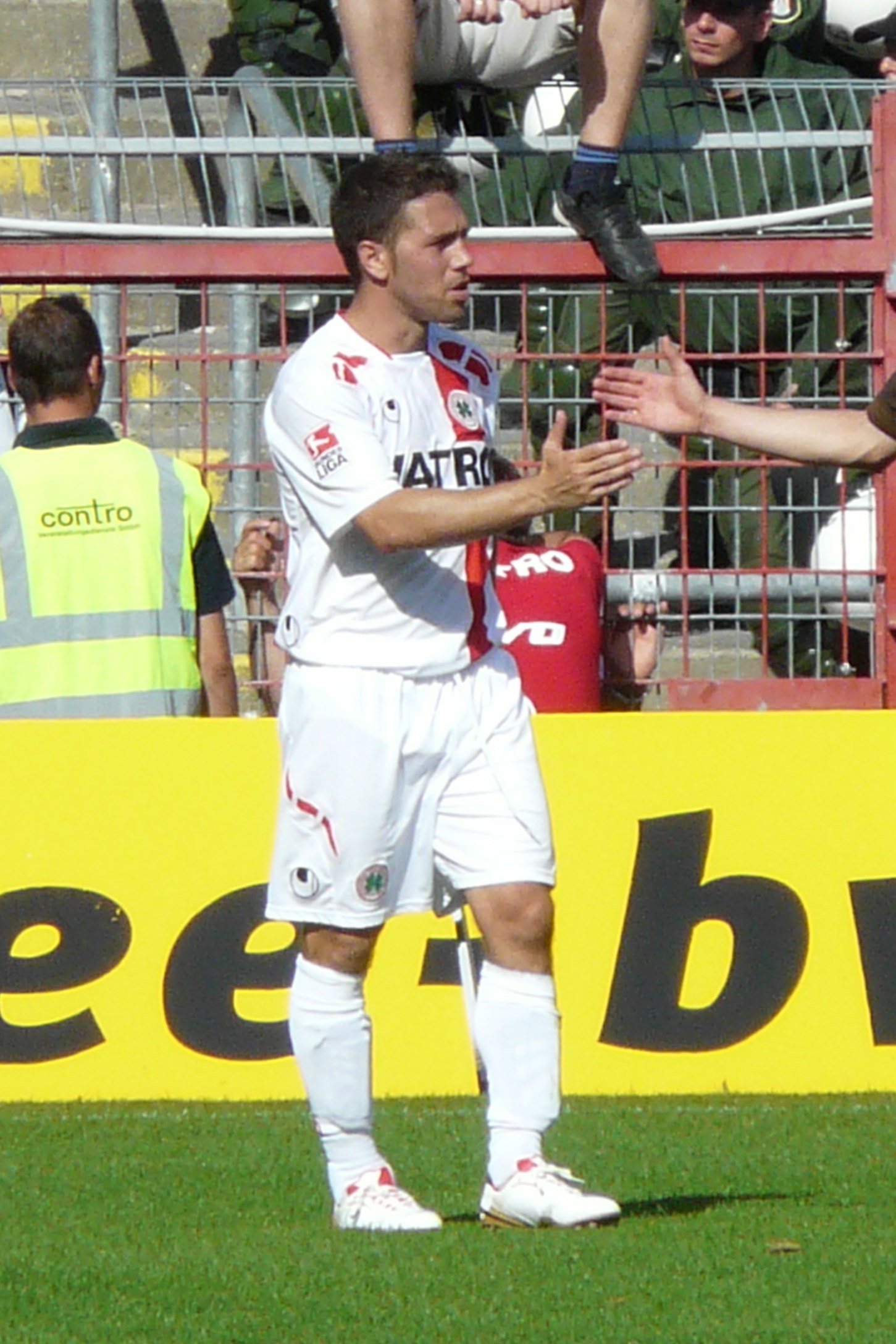
- Terranova in 2008

Personal information
- Full name: Mike Sergio Terranova
- Date of birth: 17 November 1976 (age 49)
- Place of birth: Bochum, West Germany
- Height: 1.70 m (5 ft 7 in)
- Position: Striker

Youth career
- –1995: VfB Günnigfeld

Senior career*
| Years | Team | Apps | (Gls) |
| 1995–2000 | SG Wattenscheid 09 | 27 | (1) |
| 2000–2002 | FC Gütersloh | 55 | (35) |
| 2002–2003 | Eintracht Nordhorn | 50 | (18) |
| 2003–2005 | Wuppertaler SV | 38 | (0) |
| 2005–2006 | SG Wattenscheid 09 | 34 | (7) |
| 2006–2013 | Rot-Weiß Oberhausen | 226 | (66) |
| Total | | 430 | (127) |

Managerial career
- 2016–2020: Rot-Weiß Oberhausen
- 2020–2023: Rot-Weiß Oberhausen
- * Club domestic league appearances and goals

Mike Sergio Terranova (born 17 November 1976) is an Italo-German former professional footballer who played as a striker. He was most recently the manager of Rot-Weiß Oberhausen.
