= Marc Fascher =

German football manager (born 1968)

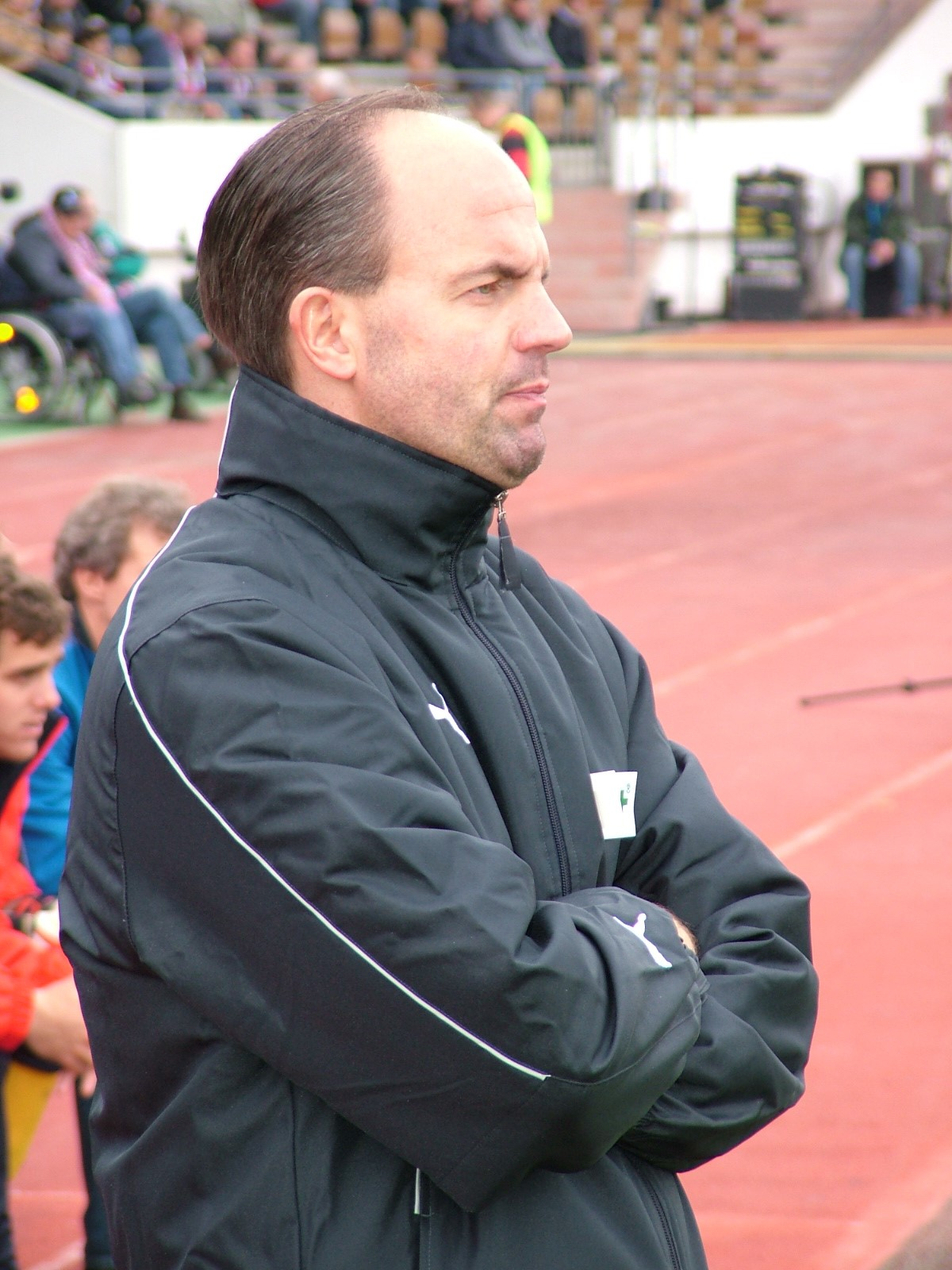
- Fascher as coach of Sportfreunde Siegen

Personal information
- Date of birth: 4 August 1968 (age 58)
- Place of birth: Hamburg, West Germany
- Height: 1.74 m (5 ft 9 in)
- Position: Defensive midfielder

Youth career
- 1990–1992: Hamburger SV

Senior career*
Years	Team	Apps	(Gls)
1992–1993	SC Concordia		
1993–1994	Victoria Hamburg		
1994–1995	SV Lurup		

Managerial career
- 1998–1999: Harburger SC
- 1999–2000: TSV Pansdorf
- 2000–2004: SC Concordia
- 2004–2007: Kickers Emden
- 2007–2008: Sportfreunde Siegen
- 2009: Carl Zeiss Jena
- 2010–2012: Preußen Münster
- 2012–2013: Hansa Rostock
- 2014–2015: Rot-Weiss Essen
- 2017: Sportfreunde Lotte
- * Club domestic league appearances and goals

Marc Fascher (born 4 August 1968) is a German football manager and former player, who last managed Sportfreunde Lotte.

== Coaching career ==
Fascher began his coaching career with Harburger SC, before being named head coach at SC Concordia in 2000. He coached Concordia for four years before being named as the new head coach of Kickers Emden. In the 2004–05 season, his first with Kickers Emden, he led the club from Oberliga Nord to the Regionalliga Nord. He suddenly resigned his position on 1 June 2007, and after four months without a club he then signed a contract to coach Sportfreunde Siegen. He coached Siegen until 1 May 2008, and then spent seven months without a club.

Fascher signed a contract on 23 March 2009 as interim coach at Carl Zeiss Jena for the final four months of the 2008–09 season and was fired on 29 May 2009, after having saved the club from relegation out of the Regionalliga.

On 21 March 2010, he took over as head coach of Preußen Münster and led the club to promotion to the 3. Liga at the conclusion of the 2010–11 season. In January 2012, Fascher left Preußen Münster and was appointed coach of Hansa Rostock eight months later.

In March 2014, Fascher was appointed as head coach of Rot-Weiss Essen on a contract until 2015. He was sacked on 31 March 2015.

He was appointed as the new head coach of Sportfreunde Lotte on 27 July 2017. He was sacked on 1 November 2017.
