= Schwarz-Weiß Essen =

- Full name: Essener Turnerbund Schwarz-Weiß; Essen 1881 e.V.
- Founded: 11 April 1881; 145 years ago
- Ground: Uhlenkrugstadion
- Capacity: 9,950
- Chairman: Karl Weiß
- Manager: Björn Matzel
- League: Oberliga Niederrhein (V)
- 2025–26: Oberliga Niederrhein, 10th of 18
Home colours	Away colours

Schwarz-Weiß Essen is a German association football club based in Essen, North Rhine-Westphalia. The side has its origins in the gymnastics club Essener Turnerbund founded in 1881. A football department was formed in January 1900 and this became a separate entity within the club on 1 July 1974. They currently compete in Oberliga Niederrhein, the fifth tier of German football.

== History ==
In 1933, the club joined the Gauliga Niederrhein, one of sixteen top flight divisions formed in the re-organization of German football under the Third Reich. They played at that level until being relegated in 1943, with their best results being a string of three consecutive second-place finishes between 1937 and 1940.

SWE returned to tier I football in 1951 in the Oberliga West, and except for spending the 1958, 1959, and 1961 seasons in the second division, played in the top flight until the 1963 formation of the Bundesliga, Germany's first professional football league.

Their moment of glory came in 1959 when a non-descript side beat Rot-Weiss Essen 1–0, Hertha BSC 6–3, and Hamburger SV 2–1 on their way to thrashing Borussia Neunkirchen 5–2 to take the DFB-Pokal. Their 1959 German Cup win made them the first ever second division side to win the trophy.

After 1963, Schwarz-Weiß played as a second-tier side in the Regionalliga West and 2. Bundesliga Nord into the late 1970s. They fell a point short of a place in the Bundesliga in 1967, finishing behind Borussia Neunkirchen in the league qualification rounds. In 1978, they descended into the then third division to the Oberliga Nordrhein and played in this league until it was disbanded in 2008. They became part of the new NRW-Liga after that and in 2012, when the latter was disbanded again, of the Oberliga Niederrhein.

== Former managers ==
- Klaus Berge: 19 May 2008 to 30 June 2009
- Fred Bockholt: 3 May 2008 to 18 May 2008
- Frank Kontny: 1 July 2006 to 2 May 2008
- Klaus Täuber: April 2004 to 30 June 2006
- Frank Benatelli: April 2000 to April 2004
- Detlef Wiemers: September 1999 to April 2000
- Jörg Jung: July 1998 to September 1999
- Frank Kontny: March 1998 to June 1998
- Dietmar Grabotin: July 1995 to March 1998
- Jürgen Kaminsky: July 1994 to June 1995
- Detlef Pirsig: July 1993 to June 1994
- Friedhelm Wessendorf: April 1993 to June 1993
- Gerd Zewe: January 1993 to April 1993
- Heiko Mertes: July 1992 to December 1992
- Fred Bockholt: July 1989 to June 1992
- Horst Döppenschmidt: July 1988 to June 1989
- Fred Bockholt: July 1983 to June 1988
- Manfred Rummel: January 1981 to June 1983
- Dieter Tartemann: July 1977 to December 1980
- Hubert Schieth: January 1975 to June 1977
- Albert Becker: July 1974 to January 1975
- Peter Velhorn: July 1973 to April 1974
- Waldemar Gerhardt: July 1972 to June 1973
- Heinz Höher: October 1970 to June 1972
- Peter Sievers: October 1970
- Kurt Sahm: July 1970 to October 1970
- Horst Witzler: July 1966 to June 1970
- Hans Wendlandt: July 1964 to June 1966
- Willibald Hahn: July 1963 to June 1964
- Kuno Klötzer: July 1961 to June 1963
- Hans Wendlandt: July 1959 to June 1961
- Willy Multhaup: July 1957 to June 1959
- Karl Winkler: July 1954 to June 1957
- Fritz Buchloh: July 1952 to June 1954
- Richard Longin: July 1951 to June 1952
- Josef Uridil: July 1949 to June 1951
- Werner Sottong: July 1945 to June 1949
- Josef Uridil: July 1938 to 1942
- Pammer: July 1936 to June 1938
- Theodor Lohrmann: 1935 to 1936
- Kurt Otto: August 1933 to 1935
- Hans Schmidt: 1932 to July 1933
- Preis: 1930 to 1932
- Herzka: 1929 to 1930
- Hans Schulte: 1926 to 1929
- Izidor Kürschner: 1924 to 1926

== Rivalries ==
In the past, the local derbies versus Rot-Weiß Essen were big events, sometimes followed by more than 30,000 fans. However, since Schwarz-Weiß's decline the rivalry has waned in importance. Although often clouded in political terms, the "reds" were meant to be left-wing and the "blacks" right-wing, in reality there was no real distinction. The rivalry was more based on geography of the city, a north (RWE) versus south (SWE) city divide.

== Honours ==
=== Senior team ===
- DFB-Pokal
  - Winners: 1959
- 2. Oberliga West
  - Champions: 1961

=== Youth Team ===
- German Under 17 championship
  - Runners-up: 1986
