= Peter Velhorn =

German footballer and manager

Personal information
- Date of birth: 24 November 1932
- Place of birth: Munich, Weimar Republic
- Date of death: 20 July 2016 (aged 83)
- Place of death: Munich, Federal Republic of Germany
- Position: Forward

Youth career
- –1950: MTV München 1879

Senior career*
Years	Team	Apps	(Gls)
1950–1952	Bayern Munich II		
1952–1958	Bayern Munich		
1958–1960	Rot-Weiss Essen	40	(13)
1960–1963	Hessen Kassel		
1963–1965	Austria Klagenfurt		

Managerial career
- 1965–1966: Austria Klagenfurt
- 1971–1972: BSK Olympia Neugablonz
- 1972–1973: SV Tasmania Berlin
- 1973–1974: Schwarz-Weiß Essen
- 1974–1975: Wacker 04 Berlin
- 1975–1976: 1.FC Schweinfurt 05
- 1976–1977: KSV Baunatal
- 1978–1979: First Vienna FC
- 1979–1980: FC Wacker Innsbruck
- * Club domestic league appearances and goals

Peter Velhorn (24 November 1932 – 20 July 2016) was a German footballer and manager.
