= Siegfried Melzig =

German footballer and manager (1940–2023)

Personal information
- Date of birth: 12 July 1940
- Place of birth: Breslau, Germany (now Wrocław, Poland)
- Date of death: 1 July 2023 (aged 82)
- Position: Goalkeeper

Senior career*
Years	Team	Apps	(Gls)
- SpVgg Weisenau
- SV Meppen

Managerial career
- 1976–1977: VfL Osnabrück
- 1977: Bonner SC
- 1977–1979: Bayer Uerdingen
- 1979–1980: Panionios
- 1980–1981: FC 08 Homburg
- 1981–1982: Freiburger FC
- 1982–1983: MSV Duisburg
- 1983–1984: Rot-Weiss Essen
- 1989–1990: SpVgg Bayreuth
- 1991: Preußen Münster
- 1998: TPS Turku
- * Club domestic league appearances and goals

Siegfried Melzig (12 July 1940 – 1 July 2023) was a German football player and manager.

He played as a goalkeeper for SpVgg Weisenau and SV Meppen.

He managed VfL Osnabrück, Bonner SC, Bayer Uerdingen, Panionios, FC 08 Homburg, Freiburger FC, MSV Duisburg, Rot-Weiss Essen, SpVgg Bayreuth and Preußen Münster.

Melzig died on 1 July 2023, at the age of 82.
