= Hans-Werner Moors =

German footballer

Personal information
- Date of birth: 24 July 1950 (age 76)
- Place of birth: Düsseldorf, West Germany
- Height: 1.81 m (5 ft 11 in)
- Position: Defender

Senior career*
Years	Team	Apps	(Gls)
1958–1969	TuRU Düsseldorf		
1969–1972	VfR Neuss		
1972–1976	Preußen Münster		
1976–1980	Arminia Bielefeld		
1980–1981	Houston Hurricane		
1981–1985	ASC Schöppingen		

Managerial career
- 1975: Preußen Münster (player-manager)
- 1983–1985: ASC Schöppingen (player-manager)
- 1985–1987: SG Wattenscheid 09
- 1987–1988: Rot-Weiß Oberhausen
- 1988–1989: VfL Osnabrück
- 1989–1991: Rot-Weiss Essen
- 1991–1994: Preußen Münster
- 1997: KSV Hessen Kassel
- 1997–1998: VfL Osnabrück
- 1998–1999: Preußen Münster
- 1999–2002: SV Wilhelmshaven
- 2002–2003: Holstein Kiel
- 2003–2005: Preußen Münster
- 2005–2006: Preußen Münster
- 2009–2011: Hammer SpVg
- * Club domestic league appearances and goals

Hans-Werner Moors (born 24 July 1950) is a German former professional football player, who played as a defender, and later manager.
