= Helmut Horsch =

German footballer

Personal information
- Date of birth: 12 October 1948
- Place of birth: Girod, Germany
- Height: 1.80 m (5 ft 11 in)
- Position: Striker

Youth career
- –1967: Eisbachtaler Sportfreunde

Senior career*
Years	Team	Apps	(Gls)
1967–1972	TuS Neuendorf		
1972–1979	SG Wattenscheid 09		
–1984	VfL Bochum II		

Managerial career
- 1982–1986: VfL Bochum II
- 1986–1989: SC Preußen Münster
- * Club domestic league appearances and goals

Helmut Horsch (born 12 October 1948) is a retired German striker and manager.
