= Slobodan Čendić =

Yugoslav football manager (1938–2023)

Personal information
- Date of birth: 28 August 1938
- Place of birth: Kragujevac, Kingdom of Yugoslavia
- Date of death: 19 September 2023 (aged 85)
- Place of death: Cologne, North Rhine-Westphalia, Germany

Managerial career
- Years: Team
- 1970–1971: Schalke 04
- 1971: Augsburg
- 1971–1972: Tasmania Berlin
- 1972–1974: Preußen Münster
- 1974–1976: Saarbrücken
- 1977–1978: Waldhof Mannheim
- 1978–1980: Saarbrücken
- 1980–1982: Stuttgarter Kickers
- 1982–1983: Alemannia Aachen
- 1983–1984: Charlottenburg
- 1985–1987: Rot-Weiß Oberhausen
- 1988–1989: Homburg
- 1989: Hannover 96
- 1990: Darmstadt 98
- 1995–1996: Brühl
- 1996–1997: Kreuzlingen

Slobodan Čendić (28 August 1938 – 19 September 2023) was a Serbian football manager resident in Germany since 1970. He was among others the manager of Schalke 04, 1. FC Saarbrücken, Alemannia Aachen, and Hannover 96.

Čendić died on 19 September 2023, at the age of 85.
