= Pierre Fassnacht =

German footballer

Personal information
- Date of birth: 26 January 1996 (age 30)
- Place of birth: Mühlacker, Germany
- Height: 1.81 m (5 ft 11 in)
- Position: Defender

Team information
- Current team: Rot-Weiß Oberhausen
- Number: 3

Youth career
- –2005: SV Iptingen
- 2005–2015: Karlsruher SC

Senior career*
Years	Team	Apps	(Gls)
2015–2017	Karlsruher SC II	24	(0)
2016–2017	→ SSV Ulm (loan)	27	(0)
2017–2019	1. FC Saarbrücken	12	(1)
2019–2020	Carl Zeiss Jena	30	(0)
2020–	Rot-Weiß Oberhausen	157	(7)

International career
2014	Germany U18	1	(0)
- * Club domestic league appearances and goals as of 23 September 2026

Pierre Fassnacht (born 26 January 1996) is a German footballer who plays as a defender for Rot-Weiß Oberhausen.

== Career ==
Fassnacht made his professional debut for Carl Zeiss Jena in the 3. Liga on 9 February 2019, starting in the home match against Karlsruher SC.
