= Jörn Nowak =

German footballer

Personal information
- Date of birth: April 25, 1986 (age 40)
- Place of birth: Germany
- Position: Central defender

Team information
- Current team: KFC Uerdingen 05 (Manager)

Youth career
- –1996: FSV Hoyerswerda
- 1996–2005: Rot-Weiss Erfurt

Senior career*
Years	Team	Apps	(Gls)
2005–2009	Rot-Weiss Erfurt	63	(1)
2009–2010	Chemnitzer FC	20	(0)
2010–2012	Sportfreunde Siegen	67	(7)
2012–2016	Rot-Weiß Oberhausen	64	(8)

Managerial career
- 2022: Rot-Weiss Essen
- 2023–2024: Rot-Weiß Oberhausen
- 2026–: KFC Uerdingen 05
- * Club domestic league appearances and goals

Jörn Nowak (born April 25, 1986) is a retired German footballer who played as a central defender.

== Career ==
Nowak began his career with Rot-Weiss Erfurt, and made his debut on the opening day of the 2005–06 season in a 4–3 win over 1. FC Köln II as a substitute for Pavel David. He spent three years playing for Erfurt in the Regionalliga Nord, and helped them qualify for the new 3. Liga in 2008, but left the club in January 2009 after making only two brief substitute appearances at this level. He returned to the Regionalliga Nord to sign for Chemnitzer FC, where he spent eighteen months without ever fully establishing himself in the first team. Chemnitz won the division in 2009–10, but Nowak, who hadn't played at all in the second half of the season, left in July 2010 to sign for Sportfreunde Siegen. He spent two years playing for Siegen in the fifth-tier NRW-Liga, helping them qualify for Regionalliga West in his second, before he signed for Rot-Weiß Oberhausen of the same division.

In May 2022, he took over Rot-Weiss Essen as an interim manager and guided them to the 3. Liga.

In June 2023, he became new manager of his former club Rot-Weiß Oberhausen.

On 16 November 2026, Nowak became new manager of KFC Uerdingen 05.
