= Rot-Weiß Oberhausen =

German football club

- Full name: Sport-Club Rot-Weiß Oberhausen e.V.
- Nickname: Die Kleeblätter (The Clovers)
- Founded: 1904
- Ground: Niederrheinstadion
- Capacity: 17,165
- Chairman: Marcus Uhlig
- Manager: Sebastian Gunkel
- League: Regionalliga West (IV)
- 2025–26: Regionalliga West, 2nd of 18
- Website: http://www.rwo-online.de
Home colours	Away colours	Third colours

Rot-Weiß Oberhausen is a German association football club in Oberhausen, North Rhine-Westphalia. The club was formed as Oberhausener SV in December 1904 out of the merger of Emschertaler SV (1902) and the football enthusiasts of Oberhausener TV 1873. The new side entered into a union with Viktoria Styrum BV to create SpVgg 1904 Oberhausen-Styrum, but within six months a number of the club's members left to form 1. FC Mülheim-Styrum. The remaining club members carried on and in 1934 took on their current name. The club has strong rivalries with fellow Ruhr clubs RW Essen and MSV Duisburg.

== History ==
The team was unremarked through its early history, simply playing local ball. After the re-organization of German football in the early 1930s under the Third Reich Rot Weiss played in the Gauliga Niederrhein but could never match the strength of division rival Fortuna Düsseldorf. During World War II the club played alongside ASV Elmar as part of the combined wartime side KSG Elmar/Viktoria Oberhausen.

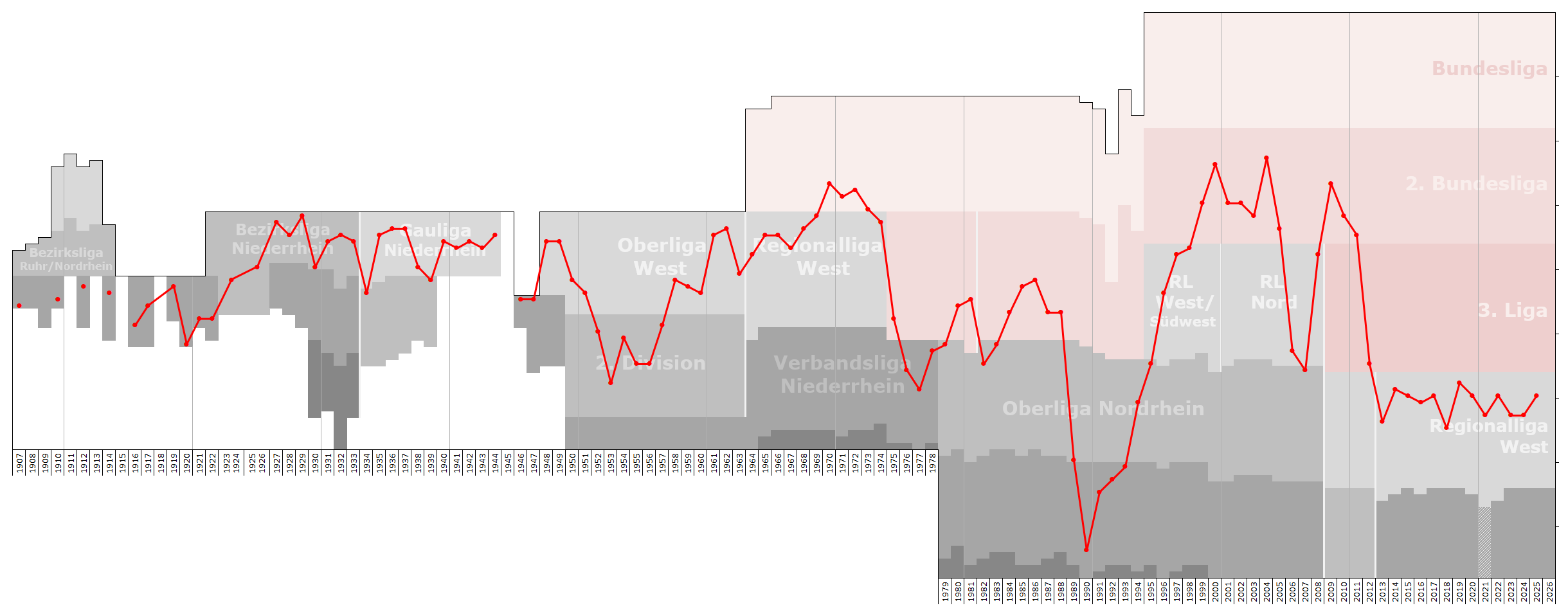
Historical chart of Rot-Weiß Oberhausen league performance

The club worked its way into the upper league Oberliga West after the war and with the formation of the Bundesliga, Germany's new professional circuit, found themselves in the second division Regionalliga West. A first-place finish there in 1969 led to promotion to the Bundesliga for the workmanlike side. The club's turn in the top flight was tainted when they were implicated in the Bundesliga bribery scandal of 1971. While it was clear they were involved, the club and its players escaped sanction. After three years in the upper league without doing any better than a 14th-place finish, the club returned to its existence as a tier II and III side.

Financial problems in 1988 were the prelude to a slide into the Verbandsliga Niederrhein (IV) two years later. After nearly a decade spent bouncing up and down between the third and fourth divisions Die Kleeblätter returned to the 2. Bundesliga in 1998, winning the Regionalliga West/Südwest. They remained a lower table side for the most part, but did manage to put forward their best ever performances with sixth and fifth-place finishes in 2000 and 2004. Oberhausen was relegated again to the Regionalliga Nord (III) for 2005. Relegation to the Oberliga (IV) followed a year later. They returned to 2. Bundesliga after two successively promotions; which were first in the Oberliga Nordrhein in 2006–07 and second of Regionalliga Nord in 2007–08 season. The club dropped out of the 2. Bundesliga in 2011, was relegated again the following year from the 3. Liga and now plays in the tier four Regionalliga West.

== Honours ==
The club's honours:

- Regionalliga West
  - Champions: 1969
- Oberliga Nordrhein
  - Champions: 1979, 1983, 1995, 2007
- Verbandsliga Niederrhein
  - Champions: 1993
- Lower Rhine Cup
  - Winners: 1996, 1998, 2018

== Recent seasons ==
The club's recent seasons:

Year	Division	Position
1963-64	Regionalliga West (II)	7th
1964-65	Regionalliga West	4th
1965/66	Regionalliga West	4th
1966/67	Regionalliga West	6th
1967/68	Regionalliga West	3rd
1968/69	Regionalliga West	1st ↑
1969–70	1. Bundesliga (I)	14th
1970–71	1. Bundesliga	16th
1971–72	1. Bundesliga	15th
1972–73	1. Bundesliga	18th ↓
1973-74	Regionalliga West (II)	2nd
1974-75	2. Bundesliga Nord (II)	18th ↓
1975-76	Verbandsliga Niederrhein (III)	5th
1976-77	Verbandsliga Niederrhein	8th
1977-78	Verbandsliga Niederrhein	2nd
1978-79	Oberliga Nordrhein (III)	1st ↑
1979-80	2. Bundesliga Nord (II)	15th
1980-81	2. Bundesliga Nord	14th
1981-82	Oberliga Nordrhein (III)	4th
1982-83	Oberliga Nordrhein	1st ↑
1983-84	2. Bundesliga (II)	16th
1984-85	2. Bundesliga	12th
1985-86	2. Bundesliga	11th
1986-87	2. Bundesliga	16th
1987-88	2. Bundesliga	16th ↓
1988-89	Oberliga Nordrhein (III)	19th ↓
1989-90	Verbandsliga Niederrhein (IV)	14th
1990-91	Verbandsliga Niederrhein	5th
1991-92	Verbandsliga Niederrhein	3rd
1992-93	Verbandsliga Niederrhein	1st ↑
1993-94	Oberliga Nordrhein (III)	7th ↓
1994-95	Oberliga Nordrhein (IV)	1st ↑
1995-96	Regionalliga West/Südwest (III)	8th
1996-97	Regionalliga West/Südwest	2nd
1997-98	Regionalliga West/Südwest	1st ↑
1998-99	2. Bundesliga (II)	12th
1999–2000	2. Bundesliga	6th
2000–01	2. Bundesliga	12th
2001–02	2. Bundesliga	12th
2002–03	2. Bundesliga	14th
2003–04	2. Bundesliga	5th
2004–05	2. Bundesliga	16th ↓
2005–06	Regionalliga Nord (III)	17th ↓
2006–07	Oberliga Nordrhein (IV)	1st ↑
2007–08	Regionalliga Nord (III)	2nd ↑
2008–09	2. Bundesliga (II)	9th
2009–10	2. Bundesliga	14th
2010–11	2. Bundesliga	17th ↓
2011–12	3. Liga (III)	19th ↓
2012–13	Regionalliga West (IV)	8th
2013–14	Regionalliga West	3rd
2014–15	Regionalliga West	4th
2015–16	Regionalliga West	5th
2016–17	Regionalliga West	4th
2017–18	Regionalliga West	9th
2018–19	Regionalliga West	2nd
2019–20	Regionalliga West	4th
2020–21	Regionalliga West	7th
2021–22	Regionalliga West	4th
2022–23	Regionalliga West	7th
2023–24	Regionalliga West	7th
2024–25	Regionalliga West	4th
2025–26	Regionalliga West	2nd

Key

↑ Promoted	↓ Relegated

== Players ==
=== Current squad ===
As of 8 September 2026

Note: Flags indicate national team as defined under FIFA eligibility rules; some limited exceptions apply. Players may hold more than one non-FIFA nationality.

No.	Pos.	Nation	Player
1	GK	SUI	Nicolas Glaus
3	DF	GER	Pierre Fassnacht
4	DF	GER	Justus Henke
5	DF	GER	Tim Böhmer
6	MF	GER	Yannik Möker
7	MF	TUR	Arda Süne
8	MF	GER	Alexander Mühling
9	FW	GER	Timur Kesim
10	MF	GER	Luca Schlax
11	FW	GER	Burinyuy Nyuydine
13	MF	GER	Kerem Yalcin
14	DF	GER	Nico Klaß
16	MF	GER	Max Meyer

No.	Pos.	Nation	Player
17	MF	GER	Joel Vega Zambrano
18	DF	TUR	Hasan Onur
19	FW	GER	Denis Donkor
20	MF	TOG	Yassir Atty
21	FW	NED	Travis de Jong
22	MF	GER	Lucas Halangk
23	MF	GER	Nils Winter
24	DF	GER	Simon Ludwig
26	MF	GER	Cankoray Mutlu
27	MF	GER	Sergio Terranova
28	GK	USA	Ryan Valentine
29	DF	GER	Michel Niemeyer
30	GK	GER	Jannis Knoblauch

== Famous players and successes ==
Rot-Weiß Oberhausen has seen three of its players capped for Germany.

The club's 1970–71 Bundesliga season was distinguished by the performance of Lothar Kobluhn, who won the league scoring title with 24 goals – 12 of those coming in the last 8 games of the season to save Rot-Weiß from relegation by just one goal. The team was embroiled in the Bundesliga scandal of 1971 and as a result Kobluhn was not awarded the Torjägerkanone trophy as top-scorer until October 2007, 36 years after his achievement.

In 1999, Oberhausen played a DFB-Pokal semifinal in Gelsenkirchen against Bayern Munich in front of 45,000 spectators, losing 1–3. On their way to their semifinal appearance they beat Borussia Mönchengladbach and Hamburger SV.

In July 2010, midfielder Heinrich Schmidtgal was selected for the national team of Kazakhstan and played his first international match in Kazakhstan's Euro 2012 qualification against Turkey on 3 September 2010.

== Managers ==
- (Socialist Federal Republic of Yugoslavia) Slobodan Cendic (1985–1986)
- (Hungary) Janos Bedl (1986–1987)
- (Germany) Hans-Werner Moors (1987–1988)
- (Germany) Gerd vom Bruch (1997–1998)
- (Bosnia and Herzegovina) Aleksandar Ristić (1998–2000)
- (Germany) Gerhard Kleppinger (2000–2001)
- (Serbia) Dragoslav Stepanović (2001)
- (Bosnia and Herzegovina) Aleksandar Ristic (2001–2003)
- (Germany) Klaus Hilpert (2003)
- (Norway) Jørn Andersen (2003–2004)
- (Germany) Jürgen Luginger (2004, caretaker)
- (Germany) Eugen Hach (2004–2005)
- (Germany) Harry Pleß (2005–2006)
- (Germany) Günter Abel (2006)
- (Germany) Hans-Günter Bruns (2006–2008)
- (Germany) Jürgen Luginger (2008–2010)
- (Germany) Hans-Günter Bruns (2010–2011)
- (Germany) Theo Schneider (2011)
- (Germany) Mario Basler (2011–2012)
- (Germany) Peter Kunkel (2012–2014)
- (Germany) Andreas Zimmermann (2014–2016)
- (Germany) Mike Terranova (2016–2020)
- (Greece) Dimitrios Pappas (2020)
- (Germany) Mike Terranova (2020–2023)
- (Germany) Jörn Nowak (2023–2024)
- (Germany) Mike Terranova (2024)
- (Germany) Sebastian Gunkel (2024-)

== Athletics ==
Rot-Weiß Oberhausen has also had an athletics section. Among its most prominent former members are Willi Wülbeck and Fritz Roderfeld. The team also became national champions in 4 x 400 metres relay in 1948 and 3 x 1000 metres relay in 1951.
