= Christian Hock =

German footballer and manager

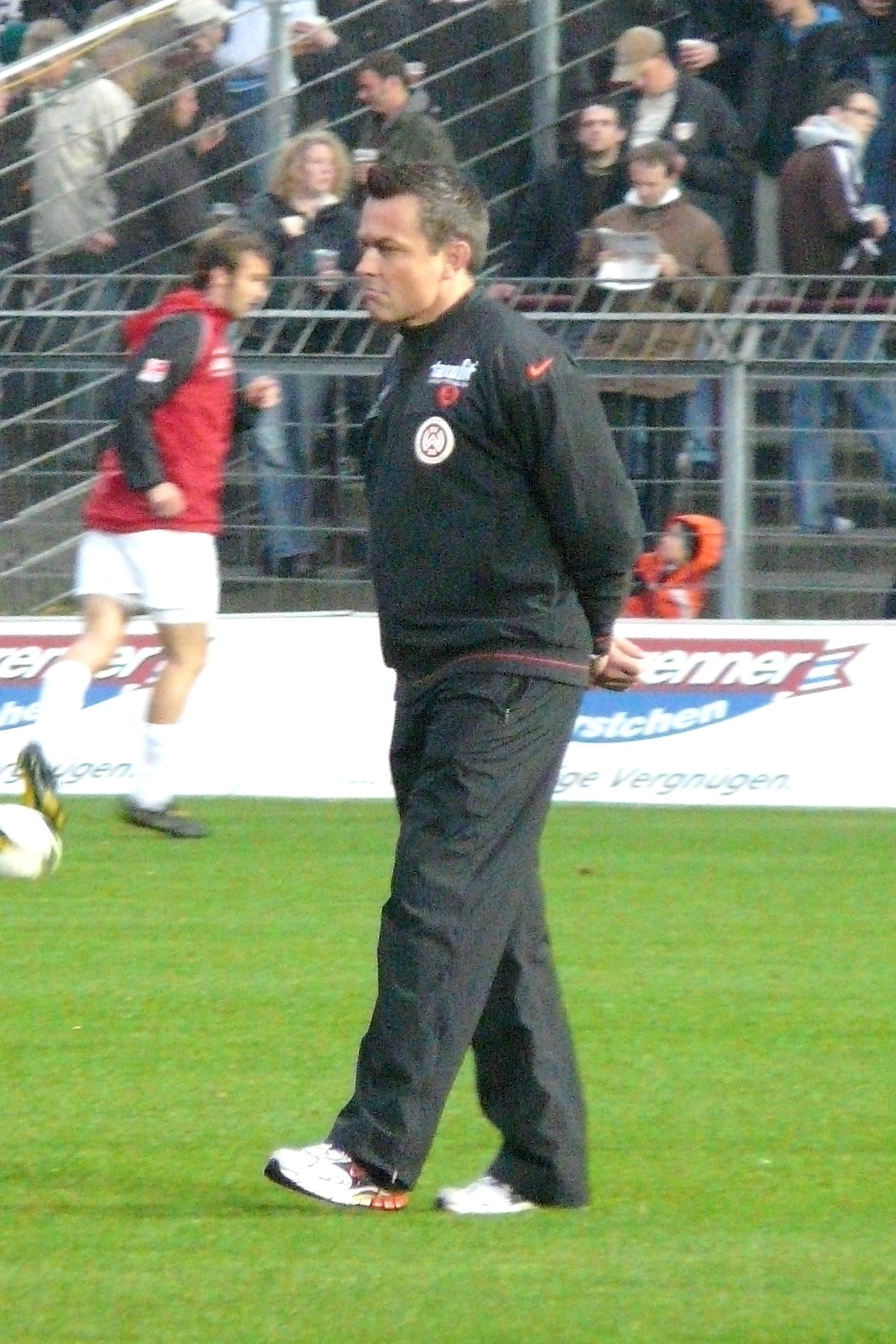
- Hock as coach of Wehen Wiesbaden in 2008

Personal information
- Date of birth: 11 April 1970 (age 56)
- Place of birth: Aschaffenburg, West Germany
- Height: 1.75 m (5 ft 9 in)
- Position: Midfielder

Youth career
- Eintracht Frankfurt

Senior career*
Years	Team	Apps	(Gls)
1988–1992	Viktoria Aschaffenburg		
1992–1994	Borussia Mönchengladbach	1	(0)
1994–2003	Mainz 05	234	(24)
2003–2005	Kickers Offenbach	14	(0)

Managerial career
- 2006–2008: Wehen Wiesbaden
- 2009–2010: Rot-Weiss Ahlen
- 2010–2011: FC Homburg
- 2011: Hessen Kassel
- 2015: Wehen Wiesbaden
- * Club domestic league appearances and goals

Christian Hock (born 11 April 1970) is a German former professional football player, coach, and manager.
