= Rot-Weiss Essen =

German football club

- Full name: Rot-Weiss Essen e. V.
- Nickname: RWE
- Founded: 1 February 1907; 119 years ago
- Ground: Stadion an der Hafenstraße
- Capacity: 20,650
- President: Marc-Nicolai Pfeifer
- Head coach: Uwe Koschinat
- League: 3. Liga
- 2025–26: 3. Liga, 3rd of 20
- Website: rot-weiss-essen.de
Home colours	Away colours

Rot-Weiss Essen is a German football club based in Essen, North Rhine-Westphalia. It plays in the 3. Liga, the third tier of German football, at the Stadion an der Hafenstraße.

Founded in 1907, Rot-Weiss Essen had its most successful period in the 1950s. The club won the DFB-Pokal in 1953 and the German championship in 1955, the latter making it the first German side to enter the European Cup. It also spent several seasons in the Bundesliga during the 1960s and 1970s.

From the late 1970s, recurring financial problems pushed Rot-Weiss Essen down into the second and third tiers. The club was refused a playing licence several times and entered insolvency in 2010, which dropped it to the fifth division. It later climbed back through the divisions and returned to the 3. Liga in 2022. Its strongest rivalries are with MSV Duisburg and Schalke 04.

== History ==
=== Early years ===
Rot-Weiss Essen was founded in the Vogelheim district of Essen on 1 February 1907 as Sportverein Vogelheim, formed from the merger of two local clubs, SC Preußen and Deutsche Eiche. The club played its first competitive matches in the summer of 1910. Late that year it began talks with the gymnastics club Turnerbund Bergeborbeck, and in August 1911 the two merged. The merger made Vogelheim a member of the regional football association and allowed it to enter championship competition. The arrangement lasted only two years. The footballers broke away from Turnerbund Bergeborbeck in September 1913 and continued as an independent club called Spiel- und Sportverein Emscher-Vogelheim. They took the name Spiel und Sport 1912 after World War I. In 1923 the club merged with Turnerbund Bergeborbeck once more, and the combined side adopted the name Rot-Weiss Essen.

=== Breakthrough to the Gauliga ===
In 1938, Rot-Weiss Essen reached the top flight by qualifying for the Gauliga Niederrhein, one of sixteen regional first divisions created in the 1933 reorganisation of German football under the Third Reich. The club was among the division's stronger sides in the years before World War II. It finished third in 1939 and 1940 and runner-up in 1941, each time narrowly failing to qualify for the national championship finals. As wartime conditions made it harder to field full sides, many clubs pooled their players. For the 1943–44 season, RWE joined with BV 06 Altenessen to compete as KSG SC Rot-Weiss Essen/BV 06 Altenessen. The combined side was soon enlarged by Ballfreunde Borbeck and went on to play as KSG RWE/BV 06 Essen.

=== Rise and golden years ===
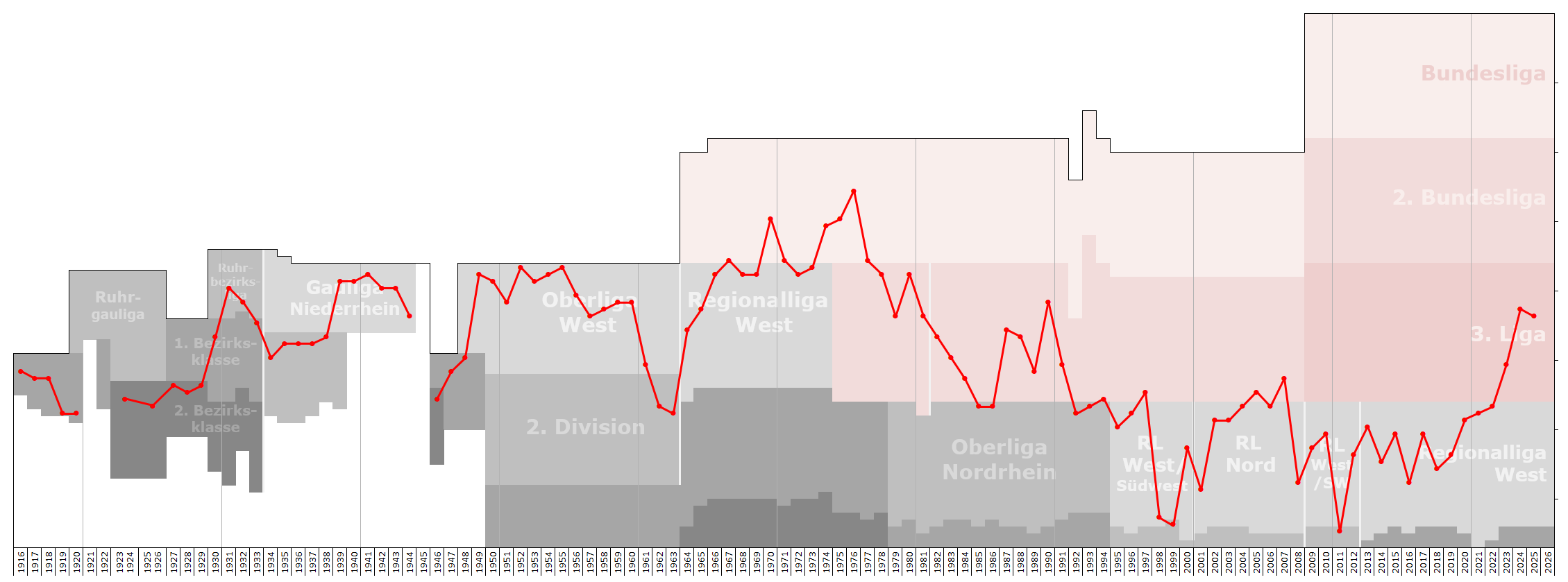
Historical chart of Rot-Weiss Essen league performance

The club returned to first division football in the Oberliga West in 1948, where a series of strong seasons saw them win divisional championships in 1952 and 1955, as well as finishing runners-up in 1949 and 1954 and third in 1950 and 1953. The pinnacle of the club's success came with a 2–1 win over Alemannia Aachen in the 1953 DFB-Pokal final, followed by a national championship in 1955 when it beat 1. FC Kaiserslautern 4–3. Due to this success Rot-Weiss became the first German side to qualify for the European Cup, losing 5–1 on aggregate to Scottish club Hibernian in the first round.

The club remained competitive for the remainder of the 1950s, continuing to finish in the division's top half, but 1961 saw a sharp decline leading to relegation from the Oberliga West at the end of the season. The club then played most of the 1960s as a second division side, though it did make a first appearance in the top-flight Bundesliga in 1966–67. It returned to the Bundesliga for two seasons in 1969–70, and again, for four seasons beginning in 1973–74.

=== Financial problems and slow decline ===
Between 1978 and the end of the century Rot-Weiss was a second- or third-tier club, with just one season spent in the regional Oberliga Nordrhein (IV) in 1998–99. During this period, the club was plagued by financial problems that saw it denied a licence in 1984, 1991, and 1994, leading to relegation from the 2. Bundesliga each time as a result. Bright spots during this period included winning the German amateur championship in 1992 and an appearance in the 1994 DFB-Pokal final, which they lost 1–3 to SV Werder Bremen.

RWE returned to the Regionalliga Nord (III) in 1999, but dropped to the Oberliga (IV) the next season. In 2004, they won promotion back to the 2. Bundesliga, but stumbled to a 17th-place finish and were relegated once again.

In November 2005, Pelé became an honorary club member (membership number 23101940).

The team reappeared in the 2. Bundesliga after winning the Regionalliga Nord in 2006, but narrowly missed staying up when they lost the critical final match of the 2006–07 season 3–0 to MSV Duisburg. Rot-Weiss then became a fourth division side following the introduction of the 3. Liga in 2008.

RWE filed for insolvency in June 2010 and were therefore not granted a license to continue playing in the Regionalliga West, but the club were granted a license to play in the fifth-tier NRW-Liga for the 2010–11 season whilst administrators restructured the club's finances. They won the fifth level NRW-Liga in 2010–11 and returned to Regionalliga West for the 2011–12 season.

In March 2014, Marc Fascher was appointed as head coach on a contract until 2015. He was sacked on 31 March 2015.

On 14 October 2017, Argirios Giannikis was appointed as manager of the club on a contract until the end of the season. He led Essen to pick up 13 points from the six games between his appointment and the winter break. On 20 January 2018, Giannikis announced that he would not renew his contract at Essen beyond the end of the season, as it was later announced that he was to become VfR Aalen manager for the following season. Having suffered hostility from Essen supporters for this decision, he left the club on 7 April 2018 and was immediately succeeded by Karsten Neitzel.

Rot-Weiss were promoted to the 3. Liga for the 2022–23 season as champions of the 2021–22 Regionalliga West, returning to the third tier of German football for the first time in 14 years.

== Stadium ==
Until 2012 Rot-Weiss played in the Georg-Melches-Stadion (capacity 15,000), named in honour of a former club president. In 1956, the team's home field became the first stadium in West Germany to have floodlights.

Since August 2012, RWE has played in the new Stadion Essen (capacity 20,000). The naming rights to the stadium include RWE AG.

== Supporters ==
Rot-Weiss Essen visiting Magdeburg in May 2008

=== Rivalries ===
Fortuna Düsseldorf, Rot-Weiß Oberhausen and Wuppertaler SV are local rivals when they are playing in the same league (as took place in the 2007–08 season). The club's fiercest rivalry is with MSV Duisburg.

The club also has a big rivalry with FC Schalke 04, from nearby Gelsenkirchen, with whom they contest the Ruhrderby; whilst historically the two clubs maintained a good relationship, Schalke's involvement in the 1971 Bundesliga scandal, which contributed to Essen's relegation from the Bundesliga in the 1970–71 season, angered Essen fans and allowed a rivalry to develop between the two clubs.

In the past, the local derbies versus Schwarz-Weiß Essen were big events, sometimes followed by more than 30,000 fans, however since their rivals decline the rivalry has waned in importance. Although often described in political terms, with the "reds" allegedly being left-wing and the "blacks" right-wing, in reality there was no substantive distinction. The rivalry was more based on the geography of the city, a north (RWE) versus south (SWE) city divide. and with northern Essen being predominantly working class historically and the south of the city being generally regarded as a wealthier area, inhabited by the upper-middle class.

=== Friendships ===
The RWE followers have a strong fan friendship with SV Werder Bremen and Austria Wien. There is also a friendship with Borussia Dortmund, although some disagreements have taken place since 2018.

== Honours ==
The club's honours:

=== League ===
- German championship
  - Champions: 1955
- German amateur championship
  - Champions: 1992
- Oberliga West
  - Champions: 1952, 1955
- Regionalliga West (II)
  - Champions: 1973
- Regionalliga Nord (III)
  - Champions: 2004, 2006
- Oberliga Nordrhein (IV)
  - Champions: 1985, 1986, 1993, 1999
- Regionalliga West (IV)
  - Champions: 2022
- NRW-Liga (V)
  - Champions: 2011

=== Cup ===
- DFB-Pokal
  - Winners: 1952–53
- Lower Rhine Cup (Tiers III–V)
  - Winners: (12) 1995, 2002, 2004, 2008, 2011, 2012, 2015, 2016, 2020, 2023, 2024, 2025

== Current squad ==
As of 17 October 2026

Note: Flags indicate national team as defined under FIFA eligibility rules; some limited exceptions apply. Players may hold more than one non-FIFA nationality.

No.	Pos.	Nation	Player
1	GK	GER	Jakob Golz (captain)
2	DF	POL	Michael Kostka
6	DF	GER	Max Geschwill
7	FW	LUX	Aiman Dardari (on loan from FC Augsburg)
8	MF	GER	Tony Menzel (on loan from Dynamo Dresden)
9	FW	SLO	Jaka Čuber Potočnik (on loan from 1. FC Köln)
10	FW	GER	Marvin Obuz
11	MF	GER	Noah Pesch
14	FW	GER	Lucas Brumme
15	DF	GER	Ben Hüning
16	MF	GER	Ruben Reisig
17	FW	GER	Semir Telalović (on loan from 1. FC Nürnberg)
18	FW	NGR	Dickson Abiama

No.	Pos.	Nation	Player
19	DF	FRA	Franci Bouebari
20	FW	GER	Marek Janssen
22	DF	GER	Janne Sietan
23	DF	GER	José-Enrique Ríos Alonso
25	MF	GER	Nick Bätzner
26	DF	GER	Ekin Çelebi
32	DF	GER	Luca Bazzoli
35	GK	GER	Felix Wienand
36	DF	GER	James Gnagnon
37	DF	GER	Jannik Hofmann
40	FW	LBN	Rami Malaeb
45	GK	GER	Romero Gerres

=== Out on loan ===
Note: Flags indicate national team as defined under FIFA eligibility rules; some limited exceptions apply. Players may hold more than one non-FIFA nationality.

No. / Pos. / Nation / Player; — / DF / GER / Nicolai Schulte-Kellinghaus (at Wattenscheid 09 until 30 June 2027)	No. / Pos. / Nation / Player; — / MF / GER / Gianluca Swajkowski (at 1. FC Bocholt until 30 June 2027)

== Former coaches ==
From	To	Manager
1955	1957	Elek Schwartz
1965	1967	Fritz Pliska
1967	1968	Erich Ribbeck
1969	1971	Herbert Burdenski
1971	1972	Janos Bedl
1973	1973	Horst Witzler
1975	1976	Ivica Horvat
1978	1979	Diethelm Ferner
1979	1981	Rolf Schafstall
1982	1983	Rolf Bock
1983	1984	Janos Bedl
1984	1984	Siegfried Melzig
1986	1987	Horst Hrubesch
1987	1987	Peter Neururer
1987	1988	Horst Franz
1988	1988	Siegfried Melzig
1989	1991	Hans-Werner Moors
1991	1993	Jürgen Röber
1994	1995	Wolfgang Frank
1995	1997	Rudi Gores
1998	1999	Klaus Berge
1999	1999	Fritz Fuchs
1999	2001	Klaus Berge
2001	2003	Harry Pleß

From	To	Manager
2003	2003	Holger Fach
2003	2005	Jürgen Gelsdorf
2005	2006	Uwe Neuhaus
2006	2007	Lorenz-Günther Köstner
2007	2008	Heiko Bonan
2008	2009	Michael Kulm
2009	2009	Ralf Aussem
2009	2009	Ernst Middendorp
2009	2010	Ralf Aussem
2009	2010	Uwe Erkenbrecher
2010	2014	Waldemar Wrobel
2014	2015	Marc Fascher
2015	2015	Jürgen Lucas
2015	2015	Markus Reiter
2015	2016	Jan Siewert
2016	2017	Sven Demandt
2017	2018	Argirios Giannikis
2018	2019	Karsten Neitzel
2019	2020	Christian Titz
2020	2022	Christian Neidhart
2022	2022	Jörn Nowak
2022	2024	Christoph Dabrowski
2024	present	Uwe Koschinat
