= 2015–16 Mittelrheinliga =

Mittelrheinliga
- Season: 2015–16
- Champions: Bonner SC
- Relegated: Alemannia Aachen II VfL Leverkusen SV Breinig SV 1914 Eilendorf
- Matches: 240
- Top goalscorer: Bayram Ilk (28 goals)
- Total attendance: 48,926
- Average attendance: 210

The 2015–16 Mittelrheinliga was the 60th season of the Mittelrheinliga, one of three state association league systems in the state of North Rhine-Westphalia, covering its southwestern part. It was the fourth season of the league as a fifth level of the German football league system.

== League table ==
The league featured five new clubs for the 2015–16 season with SpVg Wesseling-Urfeld, SV Breinig, Blau-Weiß Friesdorf and TV Herkenrath promoted from the Landesliga Mittelrhein while FC Hennef 05 had been relegated from the Regionalliga West.

Pos	Team	Pld	W	D	L	GF	GA	GD	Pts	Promotion or relegation
1	Bonner SC (C, P)	30	19	6	5	55	27	+28	63	Promotion to Regionalliga West
2	VfL Alfter	30	16	8	6	69	47	+22	56	
3	SV Bergisch Gladbach 09	30	16	5	9	60	34	+26	53	
4	TSC Euskirchen	30	14	8	8	62	46	+16	50	
5	TV Herkenrath	30	14	7	9	41	34	+7	49	
6	Borussia Freialdenhoven	30	13	9	8	47	33	+14	48	
7	FC Hürth	30	13	6	11	51	46	+5	45	
8	Viktoria Arnoldsweiler	30	12	9	9	55	53	+2	45	
9	FC Hennef 05	30	11	8	11	55	51	+4	41	
10	Spvg Wesseling-Urfeld	30	9	8	13	46	55	−9	35	
11	Blau-Weiß Friesdorf	30	9	8	13	37	48	−11	35	
12	TSV Germania Windeck	30	9	5	16	36	58	−22	32	
13	SV Breinig (R)	30	6	11	13	40	50	−10	29	Relegation to Landesliga Mittelrhein
14	Alemannia Aachen II (R)	30	7	7	16	36	50	−14	28	Relegation to Landesliga Mittelrhein
15	VfL Leverkusen (R)	30	7	6	17	34	65	−31	27	Relegation to Landesliga Mittelrhein
16	SV 1914 Eilendorf (R)	30	5	9	16	33	60	−27	24	Relegation to Landesliga Mittelrhein

Source: kicker.de, soccerway.com
Rules for classification: 1) Points; 2) Goal difference; 3) Goals scored
(C) Champions; (P) Promoted; (R) Relegated

== Top goalscorers ==
The top goal scorers:

Rank	Player	Club	Goals
1	(Germany) Bayram Ilk	VfL Alfter	28
2	(Germany) Yannick Albrecht	SV Bergisch Gladbach 09	19
3	(Germany) Sascha Engel	TSC Euskirchen	15
4	(Germany) Lucas Musculus	Bonner SC	14
5	(Germany) Benny Hoose	TSC Euskirchen	13
5	(Germany) Denis Wegner	FC Hennef 05	13
5	(Turkey) Celal Kanli	SV Bergisch Gladbach 09	13
8	(Germany) Patrick Siebert	TSV Germania Windeck	12
8	(Germany) Shpend Hasani	Alemannia Aachen II	12
8	(Germany) Mehmet Doğan	VfL Alfter	12
8	(Germany) Thomas Schmidt	SV Breinig	12
12	(Germany) Serkan Okutan	FC Hürth	11
