= Alec Vinci =

Australian soccer player (born 1999)

Personal information
- Full name: Alec Kristofer Vinci
- Date of birth: 2 October 1999 (age 27)
- Place of birth: Sydney, Australia
- Height: 1.85 m (6 ft 1 in)
- Position: Midfielder

Team information
- Current team: Siegburger SV 04

Youth career
- Manly United
- 2018: CCM Academy

Senior career*
Years	Team	Apps	(Gls)
2018–2020	CCM Academy	48	(6)
2018–2020	Central Coast Mariners	2	(0)
2020–2023	BC Viktoria Glesch-Paffendorf		
2023–2024	FC Wegberg-Beeck	17	(0)
2024–	Siegburger SV 04	26	(4)
- * Club domestic league appearances and goals as of 1 July 2025

Alec Kristofer Vinci (born 2 October 1999) is an Australian professional soccer player who plays as a midfielder for Oberliga Mittelrhein club Siegburger SV 04.

== Career ==
Vinci made his professional debut for Central Coast Mariners on 1 August 2018 in an FFA Cup match against Adelaide United. At the age of 20, he left Australia for Germany to become a professional, joining lower-league side BC Viktoria Glesch-Paffendorf. After a slow start, he became a regular starer in the 2021–22 season of the Mittelrheinliga and scored seven goals. He tore his anterior cruciate ligament during a trial at Bonner SC and missed the 2022–23 season. He returned to playing at FC Wegberg-Beeck, where he made 17 appearances in the 2023–24 season and suffered a metatarsal fracture in October 2023. He moved to Siegburger SV 04 in August 2024.
