= 2014–15 Mittelrheinliga =

Mittelrheinliga
- Season: 2014–15
- Champions: FC Wegberg-Beeck
- Relegated: Germania Erftstadt FC Bergheim 2000 TSV Hertha Walheim SC Brühl
- Matches: 239
- Top goalscorer: Benny Hoose (24 goals)
- Total attendance: 44,213
- Average attendance: 185

The 2014–15 Mittelrheinliga was the 59th season of the Mittelrheinliga, one of three state association league systems in the state of North Rhine-Westphalia, covering its southwestern part. It was the third season of the league as part of the fifth level of the German football league system.

== League table ==
The league featured five new clubs for the 2014–15 season with FC Hürth, SV Eilendorf, VfL Leverkusen, TSV Hertha Walheim and FC Bergheim 2000 promoted from the Landesliga Mittelrhein while no club had been relegated from the Regionalliga West.

| Pos | Team | Pld | W | D | L | GF | GA | GD | Pts | Promotion or relegation |
|---|---|---|---|---|---|---|---|---|---|---|
| 1 | FC Wegberg-Beeck (C, P) | 30 | 24 | 3 | 3 | 87 | 28 | +59 | 75 | Promotion to Regionalliga West |
| 2 | Bonner SC | 30 | 21 | 4 | 5 | 73 | 32 | +41 | 67 | |
| 3 | TSC Euskirchen | 30 | 18 | 7 | 5 | 87 | 43 | +44 | 61 | |
| 4 | FC Hürth | 30 | 18 | 4 | 8 | 71 | 48 | +23 | 58 | |
| 5 | Viktoria Arnoldsweiler | 30 | 15 | 5 | 10 | 73 | 48 | +25 | 50 | |
| 6 | VfL Alfter | 30 | 15 | 5 | 10 | 54 | 47 | +7 | 50 | |
| 7 | Alemannia Aachen II | 30 | 14 | 4 | 12 | 49 | 53 | −4 | 46 | |
| 8 | SV Eilendorf | 30 | 12 | 4 | 14 | 43 | 56 | −13 | 40 | |
| 9 | Borussia Freialdenhoven | 30 | 10 | 8 | 12 | 53 | 48 | +5 | 38 | |
| 10 | SV Bergisch Gladbach 09 | 30 | 11 | 4 | 15 | 55 | 53 | +2 | 37 | |
| 11 | VfL Leverkusen | 30 | 10 | 7 | 13 | 47 | 57 | −10 | 37 | |
| 12 | Germania Windeck | 30 | 11 | 4 | 15 | 42 | 65 | −23 | 37 | |
| 13 | SC Brühl (R) | 30 | 9 | 3 | 18 | 29 | 56 | −27 | 30 | Relegation to Landesliga Mittelrhein |
| 14 | TSV Hertha Walheim (R) | 30 | 8 | 3 | 19 | 33 | 71 | −38 | 27 | Relegation to Landesliga Mittelrhein |
| 15 | FC Bergheim 2000 (R) | 30 | 4 | 4 | 22 | 34 | 83 | −49 | 16 | Relegation to Landesliga Mittelrhein |
| 16 | Germania Erftstadt (R) | 30 | 3 | 5 | 22 | 30 | 72 | −42 | 14 | Relegation to Landesliga Mittelrhein |

Source: kicker.de, soccerway.com
Rules for classification: 1) Points; 2) Goal difference; 3) Goals scored
(C) Champions; (P) Promoted; (R) Relegated

== Top goalscorers ==
The top goal scorers:

| Rank | Player | Club | Goals |
|---|---|---|---|
| 1 | (Germany) Benny Hoose | TSC Euskirchen | 24 |
| 2 | (Germany) Jannis Steltzner | Viktoria Arnoldsweiler | 19 |
| 3 | (Germany) Sascha Engel | TSC Euskirchen | 18 |
