= Meguru Odagaki =

Japanese footballer

Personal information
- Date of birth: 23 May 1997 (age 29)
- Place of birth: Osaka, Japan
- Height: 1.65 m (5 ft 5 in)
- Position: Forward

Team information
- Current team: First Vienna FC
- Number: 11

Youth career
- Tondabayashi Tokiwa FC
- EXE'90FCJr
- 2010–2015: Gamba Osaka
- 2016: Alemannia Aachen

Senior career*
Years	Team	Apps	(Gls)
2016–2017	Alemannia Aachen II	9	(5)
2016–2017	Alemannia Aachen	3	(0)
2017–2018	Viktoria Arnoldsweiler	27	(22)
2018–2019	SV Straelen II	7	(8)
2018–2020	SV Straelen	36	(8)
2020–2021	Bergisch Gladbach	35	(6)
2021–2023	Gainare Tottori	13	(1)
2024–2025	Okinawa SV	15	(1)
2025	Favoritner AC	15	(4)
2025–2026	FCM Traiskirchen	16	(11)
2026–	First Vienna FC	5	(0)
- * Club domestic league appearances and goals as of 14 January 2026

Meguru Odagaki (小田垣 旋, Odagaki Meguru; born 23 May 1997) is a Japanese footballer currently playing as a forward for First Vienna FC.

== Career ==
Odagaki joined FCM Traiskirchen on 10 July 2025.

Odagaki joined First Vienna FC on 14 January 2026.

== Career statistics ==
As of 13 September 2021.

Club	Season	League			National Cup		League Cup		Other		Total	
Club	Season	Division	Apps	Goals	Apps	Goals	Apps	Goals	Apps	Goals	Apps	Goals
Alemannia Aachen II	2015–16	Mittelrheinliga	1	0	–		–		0	0	1	0
Alemannia Aachen II	2016–17	Landesliga Mittelrhein	8	5	–		–		0	0	8	5
Alemannia Aachen II	Total		9	5	0	0	0	0	0	0	9	5
Alemannia Aachen	2016–17	Regionalliga West	3	0	0	0	1 (Note: Appearances in the Middle Rhine Cup)	1	0	0	4	1
Viktoria Arnoldsweiler	2017–18	Mittelrheinliga	27	22	0	0	1	0	4 (Note: Appearances in the Kreispokal Düren)	7	32	29
SV Straelen II	2018–19	Kreisliga	7	8	–		–		0	0	7	8
SV Straelen	2018–19	Regionalliga West	14	0	0	0	–		0	0	14	0
SV Straelen	2019–20	Oberliga Niederrhein	22	8	0	0	1 (Note: Appearances in the Lower Rhine Cup)	0	2 (Note: Appearances in the Burgpokal Brüggen)	3	14	0
SV Straelen	Total		9	5	0	0	0	0	0	0	9	5
Bergisch Gladbach	2020–21	Regionalliga West	35	6	0	0	1	0	0	0	36	6
Gainare Tottori	2021	J3 League	1	0	0	0	0	0	0	0	1	0
Career total			2	0	0	0	0	0	0	0	2	0
