= Luca de Meester =

German footballer

Personal information
- Full name: Luca Ramon de Meester de Tilbourg
- Date of birth: 26 January 2004 (age 22)
- Place of birth: Germany
- Height: 1.77 m (5 ft 10 in)
- Positions: Winger; attacking midfielder

Team information
- Current team: Bonner SC
- Number: 11

Youth career
- –2014: Hennef 05
- 2014–2021: 1. FC Köln
- 2021–2022: Viktoria Köln

Senior career*
Years	Team	Apps	(Gls)
2022–2025	Viktoria Köln	30	(2)
2025–2026	SV Sandhausen	23	(3)
2026–	Bonner SC	6	(2)
- * Club domestic league appearances and goals as of 26 June 2026

Luca Ramon de Meester de Tilbourg (born 26 January 2004) is a German professional footballer who plays as a winger for Bonner SC.

== Career ==
=== Youth ===
Born in Germany, de Meester began his career with the youth team of Hennef 05. In 2014, he then moved to 1. FC Köln and played up to the U17 team. In 2021, he joined the U19 team of Viktoria Köln.

=== Viktoria Köln ===
In November 2021, de Meester scored on his senior team debut for Viktoria Köln in a 5–1 away win against SSV Bornheim in the second round of the 2021–22 Middle Rhine Cup. He came in as a substitute in the 80th minute, replacing Simon Handle and scored Viktoria's fifth goal of the match four minutes later. In June 2022, de Meester signed his first professional contract until June 2025. On 16 September 2023, de Meester made his 3. Liga debut in a 2–1 away defeat against Borussia Dortmund II, coming in as a substitute, replacing Michael Schultz in the 90th minute. In February 2024, de Meester scored his first league goal in a 5–2 home defeat against 1. FC Saarbrücken. He came in as a second-half substitute, replacing Thomas Idel, scoring Viktoria's second goal of the match in the 91st minute. Three days later, de Meester scored his second league goal in a comeback win against Sandhausen. He scored Viktoria Köln's equalizing goal in the 64th minute after conceding a goal in the 59th minute.

== International career ==
De Meester was born in Germany to a Belgian father and a Filipino mother, making him eligible to play for Germany, Belgium or the Philippines at international level.

=== Philippines ===
In March 2024, de Meester was reportedly one of the players being recruited by head coach Tom Saintfiet and team manager Freddy Gonzalez to play for the Philippines. A month later, de Meester was visited by the Belgian coach himself on one of his scouting trips in Europe.

== Honours ==
=== Viktoria Köln ===
- Middle Rhine Cup: 2021–22
