= Lucas Musculus =

German footballer (born 1991)

Personal information
- Date of birth: 16 January 1991 (age 35)
- Place of birth: Bensberg, Germany
- Height: 1.80 m (5 ft 11 in)
- Position: Forward

Team information
- Current team: SV Eintracht Hohkeppel
- Number: 22

Youth career
- Fortuna Bensberg
- –2009: 1. FC Köln

Senior career*
Years	Team	Apps	(Gls)
2009–2010	TuS Koblenz	1	(0)
2010–2011	Germania Windeck	19	(6)
2011–2013	1. FC Köln II	51	(13)
2013–2014	Viktoria Köln	7	(0)
2014–2015	Bergisch Gladbach 09	13	(1)
2015–2017	Bonner SC	72	(41)
2017–2019	Uerdingen 05	38	(19)
2019	Viktoria Köln	5	(0)
2019–2021	1. FC Köln II	36	(5)
2021–	SV Eintracht Hohkeppel	28	(11)
- * Club domestic league appearances and goals as of 13 November 2022

Lucas Musculus (born 16 January 1991) is a German football player who plays for Mittelrheinliga club SV Eintracht Hohkeppel as a forward.
