= Dennis Brock =

German footballer

Personal information
- Date of birth: 27 February 1995 (age 31)
- Place of birth: Cologne, Germany
- Height: 1.83 m (6 ft 0 in)
- Position: Midfielder

Team information
- Current team: Sportfreunde Siegen
- Number: 34

Youth career
- –2003: SC West Köln
- 2003–2014: Bayer Leverkusen
- 2014: Viktoria Köln

Senior career*
Years	Team	Apps	(Gls)
2014–2015	Viktoria Köln	7	(0)
2015–2018	Sportfreunde Lotte	35	(0)
2018–2019	Bonner SC	28	(1)
2019–2021	Fortuna Köln	19	(0)
2021–2025	1. FC Düren	97	(4)
2025–	Sportfreunde Siegen	41	(2)
- * Club domestic league appearances and goals as of 23 September 2026

Dennis Brock (born 27 February 1995) is a German footballer who plays as a midfielder for Sportfreunde Siegen.
