= Joel Vieting =

German footballer

Personal information
- Date of birth: 11 May 2003 (age 23)
- Height: 1.77 m (5 ft 10 in)
- Position: Attacking midfielder

Team information
- Current team: Eintracht Hohkeppel
- Number: 17

Youth career
- –2019: Fortuna Köln
- 2019–2021: Viktoria Köln

Senior career*
Years	Team	Apps	(Gls)
2021–2022	Viktoria Köln	2	(0)
2022–2023	Berliner AK 07	13	(1)
2023–2025	Fortuna Köln	11	(0)
2023–2025	Fortuna Köln II	25	(4)
2025–	Eintracht Hohkeppel	0	(0)
- * Club domestic league appearances and goals as of 14:48, 17 August 2025 (UTC)

Joel Vieting (born 11 May 2003) is a German footballer who plays as an attacking midfielder for Mittelrheinliga club Eintracht Hohkeppel.
