= 1. FC Düren =

German associate footballclub

- Full name: 1. Fußball-Club Düren e.V.
- Founded: 8 September 1908; 117 years ago
- Ground: Westkampfbahn
- Capacity: 6,000
- Chairman: Wolfgang Spelthahn
- Manager: Giuseppe Brunetto
- League: Mittelrheinliga (V)
- 2025–26: Oberliga Mittelrhein, 11th of 16
- Website: www.fcdueren.de
Home colours	Away colours

1. Fußball-Club Düren e.V., commonly known as 1. FC Düren, is a German association football club based in the town of Düren, North Rhine-Westphalia.

== History ==
=== FC Düren-Niederau ===
FC Düren-Niederau was founded in 1908 as FC 08 Niederau-Krauthausen and later adopted the name FC Düren-Niederau. The team's greatest success was being promoted into the Verbandsliga Mittelrhein in 1981, in which they would later go on to reach fourth place in the 1984/85 season — the best performance in the club's history. In 1991 the club were relegated from the league. In 2008 they were re-promoted into the league, but were shortly relegated at the end of the next season. In 2012 they then were relegated further from the Verbandsliga to the Bezirksliga, but promptly re-entered the Verbandsliga the following season. Their junior teams also showed great success, with the C-Juniors winning the Mittelrheinpokal in 2005 and 2012, and the D-Juniors in 2000 and 2004. Johanna Elsig became the 2009 UEFA Women's Under-17 Championship champion.

=== SG GFC Düren 99 ===
The parent club of 1. FC Düren, SG GFC Düren 99, was a product of multiple fusions between other clubs and a team associated with two Germany national football team players: Karl-Heinz Schnellinger and Georg Stollenwerk. Their roots stem back to 1899, where the team was founded as Germania Düren. On August 8, 1935, this team merged with Düren SC 03 to form SG Düren 99. SG Düren 99 went on to play in the top division Gauliga Mittelrhein league during the 1930s, and then later in the second division 2. Oberliga West following the end of World War II. During the 1980s and 90s the club found themselves in a downward spiral and dropped to Kreisliga B. On 29 June 2001, the team merged with Schwarz-Weiß Düren to form SG Schwarz-Weiß Düren 99. Six years later, however, Schwarz-Weiß Düren was re-founded as a separate team. On 1 April 2011, SG Düren 99 merged with GFC Düren 09, who had played in the fourth division Oberliga Nordrhein from 2002 to 2007, to form SG GFC Düren 99.

=== Founding of 1. FC Düren ===
1. FC Düren was founded on 30 November 2017, and took over the football section of FC Düren-Niederau, which finished the 2017–18 season in the sixth-division Landesliga Mittelrhein under their old name. On 25 April 2018, the Middle Rhine Football Association approved the merger of the youth and senior football departments of SG GFC Düren 99, also playing in the Landesliga Mittelrhein, with 1. FC Düren, which took effect on 15 June 2018. FC Düren-Niederau finished the 2017–18 season in third place, while SG GFC Düren 99 won the Landesliga Mittelrhein and earned promotion, resulting in 1. FC Düren playing their inaugural 2018–19 season in the fifth-division Mittelrheinliga.

During the 2018–19 season, 1. FC Düren reached the semi-finals of the Middle Rhine Cup before losing to Alemannia Aachen, and finished eighth in the Mittelrheinliga. In the following season under new manager Giuseppe Brunetto, Düren finished in second place in the league behind FC Wegberg-Beeck after the season was curtailed due to the COVID-19 pandemic. In addition, the club won the Middle Rhine Cup against Alemannia Aachen, securing their qualification for the 2020–21 DFB-Pokal, in which they were beaten by Bayern Munich.

== Stadium ==
The club plays its home matches at the Westkampfbahn in Düren, which has a capacity of 6,000. The stadium was opened on 9 August 1914, and was last renovated in 2014. Prior to foundation of 1. FC Düren, the clubs Germania Düren, SG Düren 99 and SG GFC Düren 99 also played at the stadium.

== Recent seasons ==
The recent season-by-season performance of the club:

Season	League	Position	W	D	L	GF	GA	Pts
2018–19	Mittelrheinliga (V)	8th	8	11	9	48	42	35
2019–20	Mittelrheinliga (V)	2nd	12	3	2	41	16	39

== Players ==
As of 15 January 2025

Note: Flags indicate national team as defined under FIFA eligibility rules; some limited exceptions apply. Players may hold more than one non-FIFA nationality.

No.	Pos.	Nation	Player
1	GK	GER	Jannick Theißen
2	DF	SRB	Julijan Popović
4	DF	GER	Viktor Miftaraj
5	DF	CRO	Petar Lela
6	MF	GER	Meric-Nuh Gültekin
7	MF	GER	Vincent Geimer
8	MF	GER	Emil Zeil
9	FW	ALB	Elsamed Ramaj
10	MF	GER	Dennis Brock
11	FW	GER	Yannik Schlößer
16	DF	AUT	Matthias Wetschka
17	FW	GER	Ephraim Kalonji

No.	Pos.	Nation	Player
18	MF	GER	Timo Kondziella
19	FW	GER	Ibish Ibishi
20	MF	GER	Rafael Garcia
21	FW	TUR	Firat Alpsoy
23	FW	GER	Jakob Sachse
24	FW	ENG	Jayden Bennetts
25	MF	POL	Adam Matuszczyk
27	DF	GER	Mordecai Zuhs
29	MF	GER	Vleron Statovci
30	DF	GER	Marcel Damaschek
33	GK	GER	Max Schreiber

== Honours ==
The club's honours:

- Mittelrheinliga
  - Champions: 2022–23
- Middle Rhine Cup
  - Champions: 2019–20
