= André van der Zander =

German footballer

Personal information
- Date of birth: 24 October 1975 (age 50)
- Place of birth: Germany
- Position: Midfielder

Senior career*
Years	Team	Apps	(Gls)
-1995/96	Fortuna Sittard	9	(0)
1996-1998	Germania Teveren	60	(2)
1998-2000	Bayer 04 Leverkusen	0	(0)
2000-2002/03	SC Fortuna Köln	77	(2)
- Germania Teveren
	FC Wanderlust 1920 Süstersee	10+	(1+)
- * Club domestic league appearances and goals

André van der Zander (born 24 October 1975 in Germany) is a German retired footballer.

== Career ==
Van der Zander started his career for Fortuna Sittard in the Dutch top flight, making 9 league appearances there.

In 1998, he signed for German Bundesliga side Bayer 04 Leverkusen, but failed to break into their first team despite consistently playing well for their reserves.

During 2002, van der Zander stayed with SC Fortuna Köln in the German fourth division even though he received offers from second division clubs Eintracht Braunschweig and Karlsruher SC due to family reasons.

For the second half of 2002/03, he returned to Germania Teveren in the lower leagues because of SC Fortuna Köln's financial problems.
