= Andy Hubert =

German footballer

Personal information
- Full name: Andeas Hubert
- Date of birth: 29 December 1990 (age 35)
- Place of birth: Bonn, Germany
- Height: 1.88 m (6 ft 2 in)
- Position: Goalkeeper

Team information
- Current team: Bonner SC II (player); Bonner SC II (gk coach); Bonner SC (gk coach)
- Number: 1

Youth career
- –2007: SV Buschdorf
- 2007–2009: Bayer 04 Leverkusen

Senior career*
Years	Team	Apps	(Gls)
2009–2010	Bonner SC II	2	(0)
2009–2010	Bonner SC	25	(0)
2010–2012	1. FC Saarbrücken	7	(0)
2012–	Bonner SC	45	(0)
2012–	Bonner SC II	67	(1)

Managerial career
- 2015–2019: Bonner SC (youth gk coach)
- 2019–: Bonner SC II (gk coach)
- 2021–: Bonner SC (gk coach)
- * Club domestic league appearances and goals as of 19:32, 2 June 2024 (UTC)

Andy Hubert (born 29 December 1990 in Bonn) is a German footballer who plays as a goalkeeper for the reserve team of Bonner SC.

== Career ==
Hubert spent two years in the youth set up of Bayer 04 Leverkusen before joining Bonner SC in 2009.

After 25 appearances in his first season, he signed for 3rd Liga side 1. FC Saarbrücken in 2010, and played in the first five matches of the 2010–11 season, owing to an injury to Enver Marina, Saarbrücken's first-choice goalkeeper. After Marina's return to action, Hubert settled into a role as second-choice 'keeper before leaving FCS in 2012 to return to Bonner SC.

Since the 2015-16 season, Hubert worked alongside his playing career in Bonner, also as goalkeeping coach for the club's academy and later on the club's reserve team. As of June 2021, Hubert took on the dual role of playing goalkeeping coach for Bonner's first team in the Mittelrheinliga.
