= Stefan Trienekens =

German footballer

Personal information
- Date of birth: 21 August 1970 (age 56)
- Height: 1.94 m (6 ft 4 in)
- Position: Forward

Youth career
- KFC Uerdingen 05

Senior career*
Years	Team	Apps	(Gls)
1989–1991	Bayer 05 Uerdingen		
1991–1993	Fortuna Düsseldorf		
1993–1994	VfL Gevelsberg		
1994–1996	FC Remscheid		
1996–1998	Fortuna Düsseldorf		
1998–1999	FC Wegberg-Beeck		
1999–2002	MSV Duisburg II		
- * Club domestic league appearances and goals

Stefan Trienekens (born 21 August 1970) is a German former professional footballer who played as a forward.
