= Landesliga Mittelrhein =

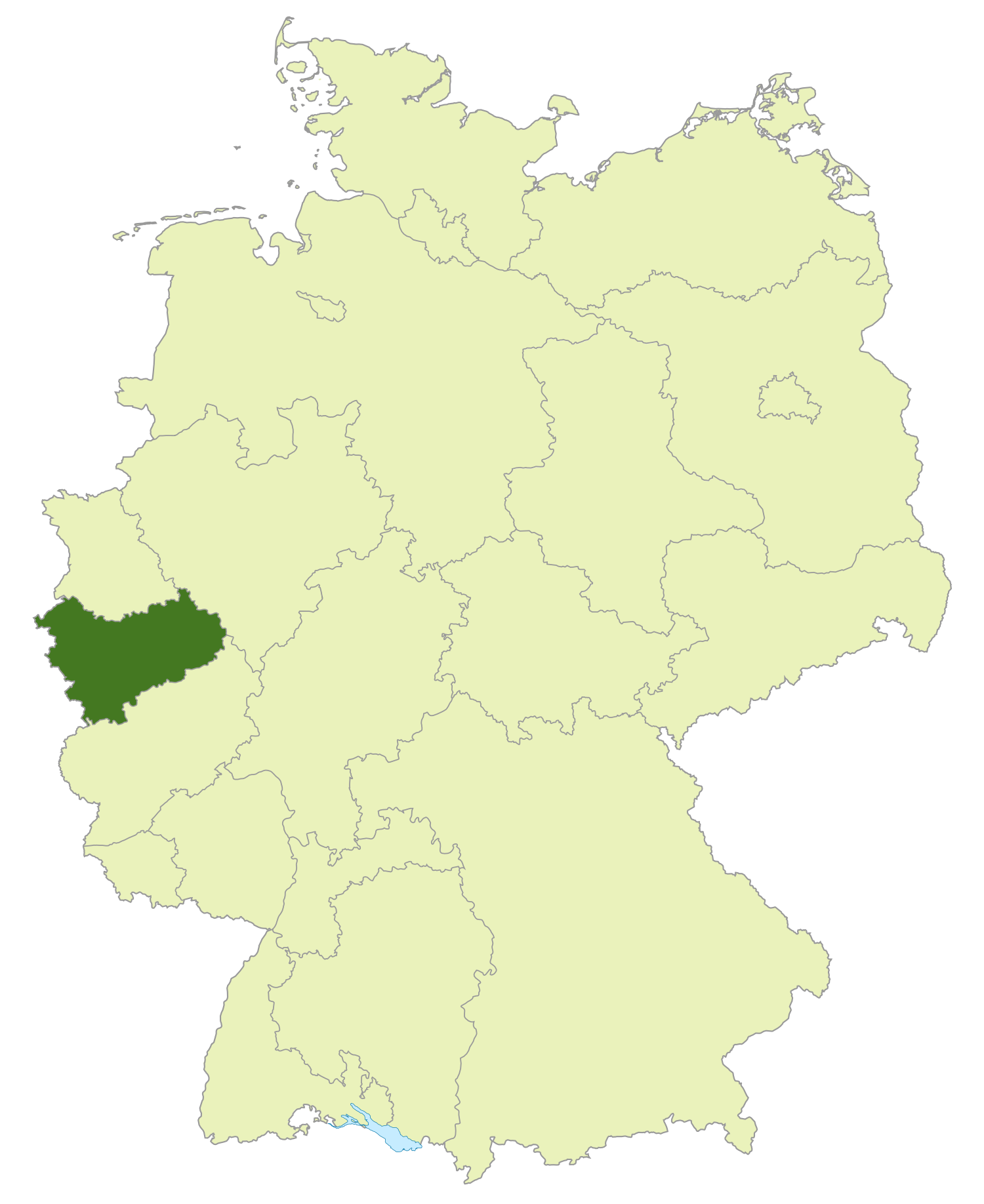
- Organising body: Middle Rhine Football Association
- Founded: 1946
- Country: Germany
- State: North Rhine-Westphalia
- Region: Middle Rhine
- Divisions: 2
- Number of clubs: 32
- Level on pyramid: Level 6
- Promotion to: Oberliga Mittelrhein
- Relegation to: Bezirksliga Mittelrhein (4 divisions)
- Current champions: Group 1: SV Eintracht Hohkeppel; Group 2: TuS Königsdorf (2021–22)

The Landesliga Mittelrhein is the second highest amateur football league in the region of Middle Rhine which is part of the state of North Rhine-Westphalia and since 2012 the sixth tier of the German football league system. It operates in two groups which run parallel below the Oberliga Mittelrhein. Until the introduction of the 3. Liga in 2008 it was the sixth tier of the league system; until the introduction of the Regionalligas in 1994 the fifth tier.

== History ==
The league was founded in 1946 as the Rheinbezirksliga (Rhine District League), the highest division for the area covered by the Middle Rhine football association. A year later another division was added. In 1949 it became a second tier to the 2. Oberliga West. In 1956 it was demoted to the third tier after Verbandsliga Mittelrhein was founded. The league still remained as feeder to the Verbandsliga with the replacement of the 2. Oberliga West by the old Regionalliga West in 1963. In turn the Regionalliga was replaced by 2. Bundesliga Nord in 1974. In 1978 it was slipped to the fourth tier under the Oberliga Nordrhein, in 1994 it was the fifth under the current Regionalliga West, and in 2008 it was the sixth under the NRW-Liga which took over after Oberliga was abolished.

In the German football league system, the Landesliga was first established as second-rate below the Oberliga West and was later slipped five times down to the seventh level by the introduction of the aforementioned higher leagues. Since the league structural reform of 2012 and the related dissolution of the NRW-Liga in favor of the Oberliga Mittelrhein, however, the league moved up from the seventh to the sixth level.

== Modus ==
The Landesliga Mittelrhein consists of eastern and western groups of 16 clubs each. The exact number of teams is carried out every year on a geographical basis.

The champions of each group are promoted to the Oberliga Mittelrhein, provided they are not reserve teams of senior clubs or are financially sound. Should a winner or both winners be deemed ineligible or refuse promotion, the next best-placed teams in their groups will be promoted. The number of promotions to the Oberliga depend on the number of relegations and promotions in that league. Teams ranked 13th (or 14th) and below are relegated to their respective Bezirksliga and are replaced by the champions and runners-up from each Bezirksliga. A reserve team is also relegated if its senior team drops down to the Landesliga.

== League champions ==
The top two in the inaugural season:

Season	Champion	Runner-up
1947	VfR Köln	Alemannia Aachen

The league champions of the two divisions since 1948:

Season	Division	
Season	1	2
1948	1. FC Köln	Rhenania Würselen
1949	Bayer 04 Leverkusen	1. FC Köln
1950	SG Düren 99	Single division season
1951	SSV Troisdorf 05	SV Baesweiler 09
1952	Tura Bonn	Viktoria Alsdorf
1953	SV Bergisch Gladbach 09	SpVg Frechen 20
1954	SC Rapid Köln	SV Baesweiler 09
1955	SV Bergisch Gladbach 09	Stolberger SV
1956	SSV Troisdorf 05	SV Bergisch Gladbach 09
1957	Bonner FV 01	SV Baesweiler 09
1958	Siegburger SV 04	Alemannia Mariadorf
1959	TuRa Bonn	VfR Übach-Palenberg
1960	TuRa Hennef	Alemannia Aachen Am.
1961	SV Schlebusch	SpVg Frechen 20
1962	BC Efferen	1. FC Köln Am.
1963	VfL Leverkusen	Viktoria Alsdorf
1964	VfL Köln 99	Alemannia Aachen Am.
1965	SC Fortuna Köln	SV Baesweiler 09
1966	SV Bergisch Gladbach 09	Borussia Brand
1967	TuS Höhenhaus	SC Jülich
1968	CfB Ford Niehl	Oberbrucher BC 09
1969	1. FC Spich	Alemannia Mariadorf
1970	TuS Lindlar	Borussia Hückelhoven
1971	SpVg Frechen 20	Viktoria Alsdorf
1972	SC Köln-Mülheim Nord	SV Baesweiler 09
1973	Siegburger SV 04	TuS 08 Langerwehe
1974	Godesberg 08	Westwacht Aachen
1975	TuS Lindlar	SG Düren 99
1976	FC Alter Markt Köln	Borussia Brand
1977	FV Bad Honnef	Blau-Weiß Niederembt
1978	Bayer 04 Leverkusen Am.	Rhenania Richterich
1979	SpVg Frechen 20	Eschweiler SG
1980	Germania Zündorf	Alemannia Aachen Am.
1981	1. FC Köln Am.	FC Niederau
1982	SC Schwarz-Weiß Köln	Gürzenicher FC 09
1983	SpVgg Oberaußem-Fortuna	TSC Euskirchen
1984	TuS Lindlar	TuS Chlodwig Zülpich
1985	SC Viktoria Köln II	VfR Übach-Palenberg

Season	Division	
Season	1	2
1986	SSG Bergisch Gladbach	Gürzenicher FC 09
1987	SC Brück	SC Erkelenz 09
1988	VfL Rheinbach	SpVgg Oberaußem-Fortuna
1989	TuS Marialinden	SC Erkelenz 09
1990	SpVg Frechen 20	Westwacht Aachen
1991	FC Pesch	SV Baesweiler 09
1992	SSV Marienheide	Borussia Freialdenhoven
1993	DJK Winfriedia Mülheim	Gürzenicher FC 09
1994	TuS Höhenhaus	Alemannia Aachen II
1995	SSG Bergisch Gladbach	SpVgg Oberaußem-Fortuna
1996	Siegburger SV 04	Kohlscheider BC
1997	SpVg Frechen 20	SSV Körrenzig
1998	SSV Eintracht Köln	TuS Schmidt
1999	SC West Köln	Eschweiler SG
2000	PSI Yurdumspor Köln	Alemannia Aachen Am.
2001	Germania Dattenfeld	Gürzenicher FC 09
2002	Blau-Weiß Brühl	Germania Lich-Steinstraß
2003	VfL Leverkusen	FC Wegberg-Beeck
2004	Sportfreunde Troisdorf	Germania Teveren
2005	BC Berrenrath	Westwacht Aachen
2006	Spvg Wesseling-Urfeld	Rhenania Eschweiler
2007	FC Hennef 05	Kaller SC
2008	SC Renault Brühl	Germania Teveren
2009	SV Wachtberg	Viktoria Arnoldsweiler
2010	VfL Alfter	SV Rott
2011	Sportfreunde Troisdorf	TSV Hertha Walheim
2012	SG Köln-Worringen	FC Erftstadt
2013	Bonner SC	SV Nierfeld
2014	FC Hürth	FC Bergheim 2000
2015	DJK BW Friesdorf	Spvg Wesseling-Urfeld
2016	Siegburger SV 04	Hilal Bergheim
2017	SSV Merten	SV Breinig
2018	SV Deutz 05	GFC Düren 99
2019	FC Pesch	Spvg Wesseling-Urfeld
2020	VfL Alfter	BC Viktoria Glesch-Paffendorf
2021	Season curtailed and annulled	
2022	SV Eintracht Hohkeppel	TuS Königsdorf

- Note: No teams were promoted from 1951 to 1955.
