= Şenol İbişi =

German footballer (born 1979)

Personal information
- Date of birth: 17 March 1979 (age 47)
- Place of birth: Duisburg, West Germany
- Position: Midfielder

Youth career
- –1996: MSV Duisburg
- 1996–1997: KFC Uerdingen 05

Senior career*
Years	Team	Apps	(Gls)
1997–1998	KFC Uerdingen 05		
1997–2001	Altay		
1999–2000	→ Elazığspor (loan)		
2000–2001	→ Çorluspor (loan)		
2002	Eyüpspor		
2002–2005	Germania Teveren		
2005–2006	SV 19 Straelen		
2006–2008	SF Hamborn 07		
2008–2009	VfL Tönisberg		
- * Club domestic league appearances and goals

Şenol İbişi (born 17 March 1979) is a German retired footballer who played as a midfielder.
