= Blau-Weiß Brühl =

German football club

- Full name: Fußballclub Blau-Weiß Brühl 1949 e.V.
- Founded: 1949
- Dissolved: 2009
- Ground: Schlossparkstadion
- League: Mittelrheinliga
Home colours	Away colours

Blau-Weiß Brühl (officially known as Fußballclub Blau-Weiß Brühl 1949 e.V.) was a football club from the town of Brühl in the Rhineland region of Germany. The club's first team participated in the DFB-Pokal in 2001.

== History ==
The football club was founded in 1949 and for many decades played at the district level. In 2000, the club achieved promotion to the district league for the first time, followed by a rapid ascent to the Landesliga Mittelrhein (Mittelrhein League). In 2001, under the guidance of coach Nissim Beniesch, Blau-Weiß Brühl reached the final of the Mittelrheinpokal (Mittelrhein Cup) and defeated the reserves of Bayer 04 Leverkusen in the process. On May 24, 2001, they won the final against Borussia Freialdenhoven with a score of 3–2. This made the team the first seventh-tier club to qualify for the DFB-Pokal 2001/02. In the DFB-Pokal, Blau-Weiß Brühl, now playing at the sixth-tier level due to their previous promotion, faced Bundesliga side 1. FC Kaiserslautern and lost 1–4 after initially taking a 1–0 lead in front of approximately 6,000 spectators.

Subsequently, Blau-Weiß Brühl achieved another promotion to the Verbandsliga Mittelrhein (Mittelrhein Association League) in the league competition. However, in the 2002/03 season, the team narrowly avoided relegation, and a year later, they finished in last place and were relegated back to the Landesliga. The merger of TuRa Hennef with FC Geistingen to form FC Hennef 05 prevented Brühl from being relegated to the Bezirksliga. Nonetheless, they were eventually relegated to that league in 2006 due to sporting reasons. With the absence of sporting success and further relegations to the Kreisliga A and Kreisliga B in 2008, Blau-Weiß Brühl also lost important players and officials.

In the 2008/09 season, the team was withdrawn from competitive play and the club was ultimately dissolved. This development was facilitated by the simultaneous success of local rivals SC Brühl 06/45, who achieved promotion to the fifth-tier Mittelrheinliga in 2008.

== Honors ==
- Winner of the Middle Rhine Cup in 2001

== Notable personalities ==
- Fuat Kılıç
- Wolodymyr Ljutyj
- Mohamed Azima
