= Mike Owusu =

Mike Owusu may refer to:

- Mike Owusu (footballer, born 1977), Ghanaian footballer
- Mike Owusu (footballer, born 1995), German-Ghanaian footballer
