= Stephan Salger =

German professional footballer (born 1990)

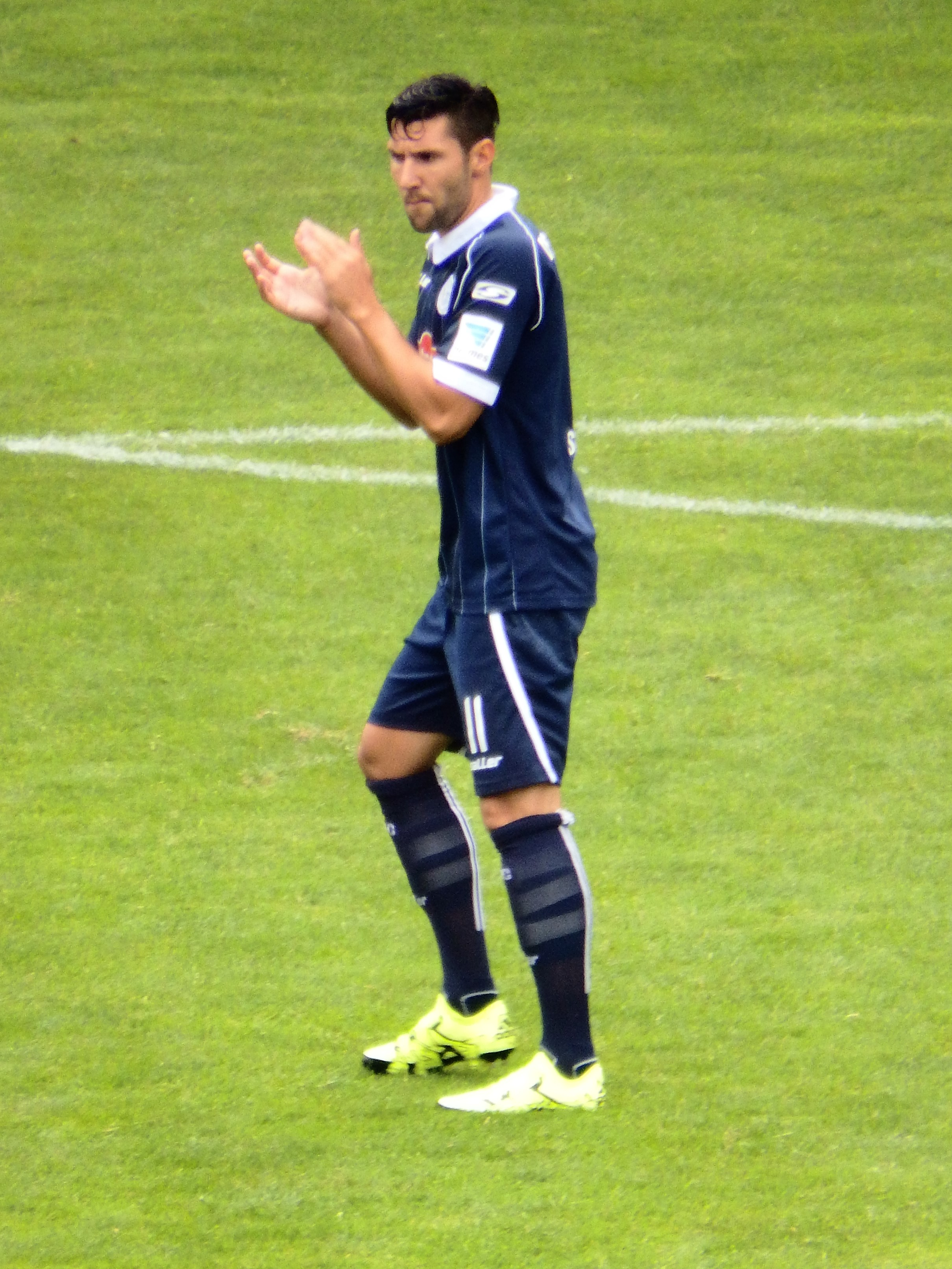
- Salger with Arminia Bielefeld in 2015

Personal information
- Date of birth: 30 January 1990 (age 36)
- Place of birth: Düren, West Germany
- Height: 1.84 m (6 ft 0 in)
- Position: Defender

Team information
- Current team: TuS Langerwehe
- Number: 11

Youth career
- 2002–2009: 1. FC Köln

Senior career*
Years	Team	Apps	(Gls)
2009–2011	1. FC Köln II	48	(2)
2009–2012	1. FC Köln	5	(0)
2011–2012	→ VfL Osnabrück (loan)	37	(2)
2012–2020	Arminia Bielefeld	200	(4)
2020–2022	1860 Munich	67	(2)
2022–2025	1. FC Köln II	70	(1)
2025–	TuS Langerwehe	0	(0)

International career
2010–2011	Germany U21	2	(0)
- * Club domestic league appearances and goals as of 16:07, 17 August 2025 (UTC)

Stephan Salger (born 30 January 1990) is a German professional footballer who plays as a defender for TuS Langerwehe.

== Club career ==
Born in Düren, West Germany, Salger joined the youth system of 1. FC Köln in 2002. He made his debut for the club at the beginning of the 2010–11 season in a 3–1 defeat against 1. FC Kaiserslautern.

He had a spell on loan at VfL Osnabrück in the 2011–12 season, before signing for Arminia Bielefeld in 2012.

After eight years at Arminia Bielefeld, he joined 1860 Munich for an undisclosed fee in September 2020.

== International career ==
On 16 November 2010, Salger earned his first cap for the Germany U21 team after coming on as a second-half substitute in the 2–0 win against England U21 in a friendly match.
