= Bahadir Incilli =

German footballer

Personal information
- Date of birth: 25 August 1989 (age 37)
- Place of birth: Köln, Germany
- Height: 1.86 m (6 ft 1 in)
- Position: Centre-back

Youth career
- –2004: SCB Viktoria Köln
- 2004–2008: VfL Leverkusen

Senior career*
Years	Team	Apps	(Gls)
2008–2010	Wuppertaler SV II	38	(5)
2010	Wuppertaler SV	4	(0)
2010	Schalke 04 II	4	(0)
2011–2012	Fortuna Düsseldorf II	46	(1)
2012–2016	1. FC Monheim		
2016–2018	FC Leverkusen		
2019–2023	1. FC Monheim		
- * Club domestic league appearances and goals

Bahadir Incilli (born 25 August 1989) is a German former footballer who played as a centre-back.

== Career ==
Incilli was born in Köln. He began his career with SCB Viktoria Köln and signed 2004 for rival VfL Leverkusen. After four years with VfL Leverkusen, he signed in summer 2008 for Wuppertaler SV II. On 21 April 2010 made his professional debut for the Wuppertaler SV in the 3. Liga against VfB Stuttgart II. He signed on 24 May 2010 a one-year contract with Schalke 04 and left the reserve team of Wuppertaler SV. After just a half year with Schalke 04 II he joined on 21 January 2011 to Fortuna Düsseldorf.

In January 2019, after two-and-a-half years with FC Leverkusen, Incilli returned to former club 1. FC Monheim.
