= Maximilian Pommer =

German footballer

Personal information
- Date of birth: 18 August 1997 (age 29)
- Place of birth: Neuhaus am Rennweg, Germany
- Position: Midfielder

Team information
- Current team: Bonner SC
- Number: 10

Youth career
- –2010: Rot-Weiß Erfurt
- 2010–2011: 1. FC Nürnberg
- 2011–2016: Rot-Weiß Erfurt

Senior career*
Years	Team	Apps	(Gls)
2016–2017	Rot-Weiß Erfurt	1	(0)
2017–2020	Lokomotive Leipzig	29	(1)
2020–2021	Rot-Weiß Koblenz	33	(3)
2021–	Bonner SC	65	(3)
- * Club domestic league appearances and goals as of 19:56, 3 March 2024 (UTC)

Maximilian Pommer (born 18 August 1997) is a German footballer who plays as a midfielder for Bonner SC.
