= Marcel Damaschek =

German footballer

Personal information
- Full name: Marcel Damaschek
- Date of birth: 24 March 1997 (age 29)
- Place of birth: Cologne, Germany
- Height: 1.86 m (6 ft 1 in)
- Position: Left back

Team information
- Current team: Bonner SC
- Number: 21

Youth career
- –2008: Pulheimer SC
- 2008–2016: FC Köln

Senior career*
Years	Team	Apps	(Gls)
2016–2017	Sonnenhof Großaspach	3	(0)
2017	Wuppertaler SV	1	(0)
2017–2018	Alemannia Aachen	19	(4)
2018–2019	FC Köln II	19	(0)
2019–2020	TSV Steinbach	2	(0)
2020–2021	Bonner SC	39	(2)
2021–2023	Alemannia Aachen	54	(4)
2023–2025	1. FC Düren	47	(0)
2025–	Bonner SC	33	(0)
- * Club domestic league appearances and goals as of 23 September 2026

Marcel Damaschek (born 24 March 1997) is a German footballer who plays as a left back for Bonner SC.
