= Willi Bars =

German footballer

Personal information
- Date of birth: 13 February 1916
- Place of birth: Germany
- Date of death: January 2000
- Position: Forward

Senior career*
Years	Team	Apps	(Gls)
1940–1941	VfL Köln 1899	8	(3)
1941–1942	Blau-Weiß 90 Berlin	1	(0)
1949–1953	1. FC Köln	74	(27)
- * Club domestic league appearances and goals

Willi Bars (13 February 1916 – January 2000) was a former German footballer.

He helped 1. FC Köln reach the top division a year after their foundation in the western second division. He also helped steer Köln to their first championship final in 1953.

1953 was also the final year in which he would play football professionally.
