= Mike Owusu (footballer, born 1995) =

German-Ghanaian footballer

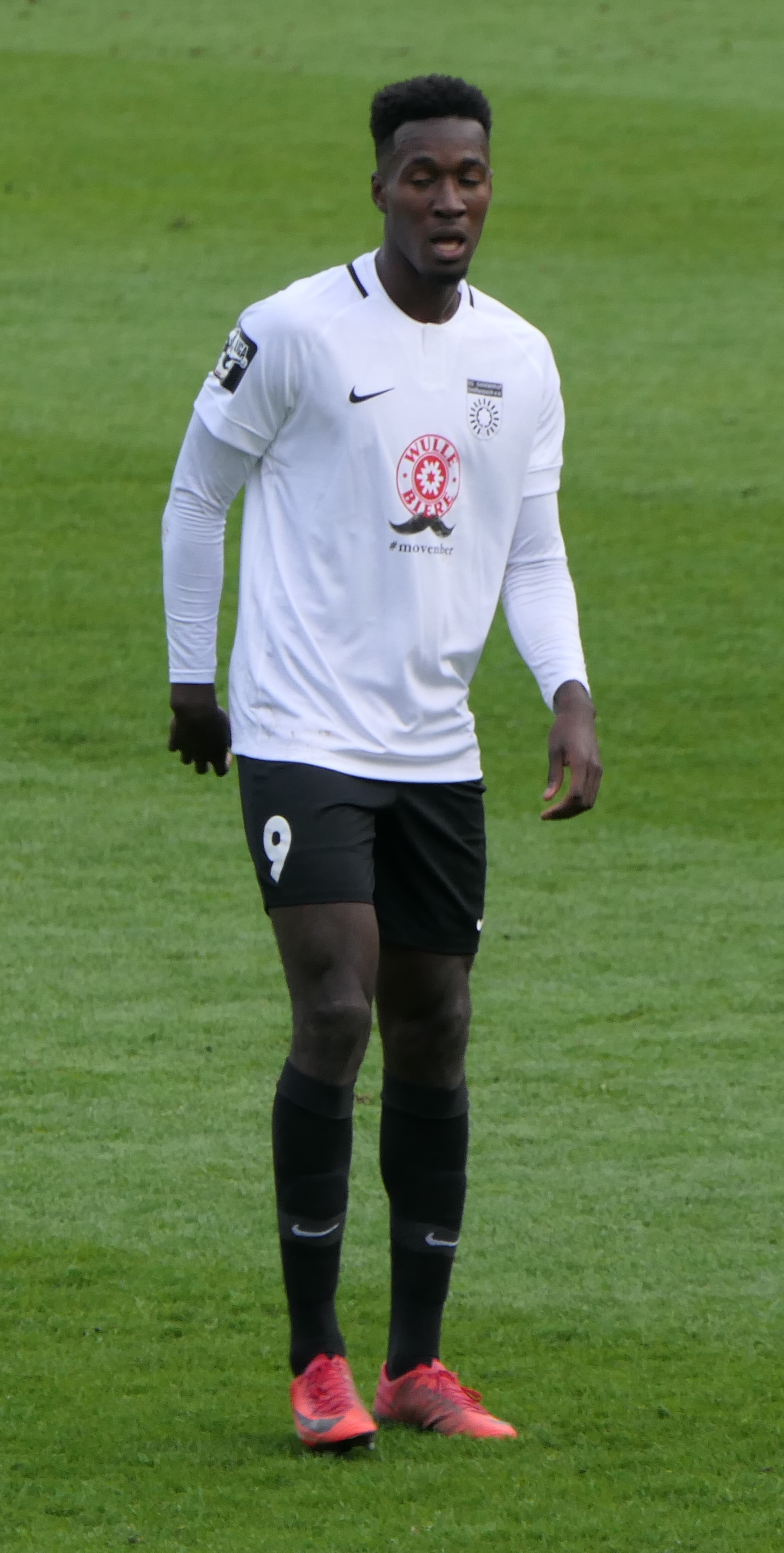
- Owusu in 2018

Personal information
- Full name: Mike Owusu
- Date of birth: 20 May 1995 (age 31)
- Place of birth: Berlin, Germany
- Height: 1.90 m (6 ft 3 in)
- Position: Forward

Team information
- Current team: 1. FC Düren
- Number: 14

Youth career
- Tennis Borussia Berlin
- –2013: Hertha BSC

Senior career*
Years	Team	Apps	(Gls)
2014–2017	Hertha BSC II	38	(6)
2017–2018	Hansa Rostock	15	(0)
2018–2019	Sonnenhof Großaspach	13	(0)
2019–2022	Fortuna Köln	93	(9)
2022–	1. FC Düren	1	(1)
- * Club domestic league appearances and goals as of 29 July 2022

Mike Owusu (born 20 May 1995) is a German-Ghanaian footballer who plays as a forward for 1. FC Düren.
