= Siegburger SV 04 =

Association football club

- Full name: Siegburger Sportverein 04 e. V.
- Founded: 1904
- Ground: Walter-Mundorf-Stadion, Siegburg
- Capacity: 5,000
- Chairman: Christian Kohr
- Manager: Bünyamin Kilic
- League: Mittelrheinliga
- 2025–26: Oberliga Mittelrhein, 3rd of 16
Home colours	Away colours

Siegburger SV 04 is a football club located in Siegburg, North Rhine-Westphalia.

Founded in 1904, Siegburger SV has spent most of its history in the third-tier of German football. In the early 1980s, the club made two appearances in the DFB Pokal and currently competes in the fifth-tier Mittelrheinliga.

== History ==
Siegburger SV was founded in 1904 under the name of Siegburger FC. The club has played under its current name since 1909, when it merged with two other local clubs (FC Adler Siegburg and VfB Siegburg).

In 1947, the club's first team was promoted to the second-tier Rheinbezirksliga, where it played until 1956 with only one year of absence (1949). That year, Siegburg failed to qualify for the newly created Verbandsliga Mittelrhein, but eventually managed to gain promotion in 1958. The club experienced a particularly successful period around 1960: two second-place finishes (1959,1960) were followed up by a first-place in 1961, which enabled the team to successfully play for the Westdeusche Amteurmeisterschaft ('West German non-league championship'). The team thus advanced to the final of the 1961 German Amateur Championship. Although the game was lost to Holstein Kiel II, it remains an important milestone in the club's history.

Though Siegburg had qualified for promotion to the 2. Oberliga West in 1961— then the second tier of German football — the club chose to remain in the Verbandsliga Mittelrhein. The club played in the same league for most of the 1960s and 1970s, though they were relegated in 1968 and did not return until 1973.

In 1977, the club finished second behind 1.FC Köln II and went on to play for promotion to the 2. Bundesliga. The final match ended in a defeat against 1. FC Bocholt. The following year, Siegburg became a member of the new Oberliga Nordrhein which was at the time a third-tier league. During the 1980s, the club fluctuated between the third and the fourth tier of German football. It was during this time that the club participated in the DFB Pokal on two occasion, achieving a third-round (1980–81) and a first-round (1981–2) finish. However, in 1990, the first team was relegated to the fifth-tier Landesliga Mittelrhein. A return to Verbandsliga in 1996 lasted until 1999.

There followed a steep decline of play that led to a relegation to the eighth-tier Kreisliga A in 2004. The club's fortunes changed dramatically after 2007: the next 10 years saw Siegburg climb back to the fifth-tier Mittelrheinliga (promoted 2016), where they currently play.

== Colours and badge ==
Siegburger SV's colours are blue and white.

Siegburger SV's badge features the letters SSV and the number 04 in white on a circular background of blue. The badge is surrounded by a white border.

== Stadium ==
Siegburger SV play their home matches at Walter-Mundorf-Stadion. The stadium was built in 1975 and has a capacity of 10,000 spectators.

== Honours ==
- German amateur football championship
  - Second place: 1961
- DFB Pokal
  - Third round: 1980–81
  - First round: 1981–82
- Verbandsliga Mittelrhein (III)
  - Champions: 1961
  - Second place: 1959, 1960, 1977

== Notable players ==
- Hans Cieslarczyk
- Jean-Pierre de Keyser
- Karl Flink
- Wolfgang Overath
- Hans Sarpei
