= SC Jülich =

German football club

- Full name: Sport-Club Jülich 10/97 e.V.
- Founded: 1910
- Ground: Karl-Knipprath-Stadion
- Capacity: 5,500
- League: Kreisliga A Düren (VIII)
- 2015–16: Kreisliga B Düren Staffel 1 (IX), 1st ↑
Home colours	Away colours

SC Jülich is a German association football club from the city of Jülich, North Rhine-Westphalia. The club distinguished itself by winning three consecutive German amateur football championships from 1969 to 1971 while part of the third division Amateurliga Mittelrhein.

== History ==
The club was founded on 12 January 1910 as Fußball-Club Jülich through the merger of predecessors Jülicher Gymnasial Turn- und Spielverein, Alemannia Jülich, and Viktoria Jülich . GTSV was the successor to Fußball-Club Juliacum 1903 Jülich. The team was later renamed Sport-Club Jülich and first came to note with an advance to the Verbandsliga Mittelrhein (III) following their title in the Landesliga Mittelrhein (IV) in 1966. They earned a third-place result in their debut campaign before going on to win a string of three divisional titles. They declined participation in the promotion round for the Regionalliga West (II) in each of these seasons, and instead went on to a record three consecutive national amateur championships. In their final appearance in amateur championship play in 1972, the side went out against TSV Marl-Hüls in their semifinal tie. The playoff went to three games after the two teams exchanged 6:0 victories before TSV prevailed 4:3 on penalties.

SC earned a second place and two third-place finishes over the next four seasons before slipping to mid-table status. The club finished bottom in the newly formed Amateuroberliga Nordrhein (III) in 1979 and was demoted to the Verbandsliga Mittelrhein (IV) for a single season. On returning to the Amateuroberliga they remained a lower-tier side until demoted again for the 1986–87 season. They repeated the cycle of middling performances followed by demotion over the next seven seasons.

Between 1975 and 1993, SC took part in play for the DFB-Pokal (German Cup) eight times with their furthest advance coming in 1985 when they were put out in an eighth-final match by Bundesliga (I) side Werder Bremen (2:4).

Jülich played improved football in their next two campaigns, before succumbing to bankruptcy in 1997 when it was discovered that their sponsor was supporting the team using embezzled funds. The club was reestablished in September 1997 as SC Jülich 10/97 and played in Bezirksliga competition through most of the early 2000s. SC was again bankrupted in 2010 and, after a second reorganization, slipped from the Kreisliga A to resume play in the Kreisliga C (X), where they played until 2015. A league championship at this level in which the club won all 26 season games took it back up to the Kreisliga B. Unbeaten in the following season as well Jülich won the Kreisliga B and was promoted to the Kreisliga A.
