= TuS Langerwehe =

German football club

- Full name: Turn- und Sportverein 1908 Langerwehe e.V.
- Founded: 1908
- Ground: Sportplatz Langerwehe
- Capacity: 9,000
- Chairman: Markus Kuckertz
- Manager: Hajo Meuser
- League: Bezirksliga Mittelrhein 3 (VII)
- 2015–16: 6th
Home colours	Away colours

TuS Langerwehe is a German association football club from the town of Langerwehe, North Rhine-Westphalia. The club's greatest success has been promotion to the tier three Oberliga Nordrhein on five occasions, to be relegated again after short stints in the league.

The club has also qualified for the DFB-Pokal, the German Cup, on seven occasions, reaching the round of sixteen twice.

== History ==
TuS Langerwehe was formed in 1908 after an earlier football club, Alemannia Langerwehe was formed in 1906 but soon folded again. Long a local amateur club TuS began its rise through the league system in the early 1970s after former German international Georg Stollenwerk was hired as coach.

The club first won promotion to the highest football league in the Middle Rhine region, the tier three Verbandsliga Mittelrhein, in 1973. In 1978 a league reform created the Oberliga Nordrhein as the new third tier, covering the Middle Rhine and Lower Rhine regions. TuS Langerwehe became a founding member of the Oberliga Nordrhein in 1978, courtesy to a sixth-place finish in the Verbandsliga when a top ten finish was required to qualify, and played at this level for three seasons. It finished fifth in the league in 1979–80, its best-ever result in the league but was relegated the season after. TuS became a yo-yo club after this, fluctuating between the Verbandsliga Mittelrhein and the Oberliga Nordrhein for almost two decades. It won promotion back to the Oberliga in 1982, 1990, 1994 and 1997 but each time lasted for only two seasons before dropping down again. Its last relegation from the league came in 1999 and the club was forced to withdraw its team altogether from the Verbandsliga during the 1999–2000 season.

In the era from 1973 to 2000 when TuS Langerwehe either played in the Verbandsliga or the Oberliga above the club also made seven appearances in the German Cup. Its first participation came in the 1974–75 DFB-Pokal where it lost to Rot-Weiß Oberhausen 4–2 after extra time. Its next appearance came in the 1976–77 edition where it lost 7–3 to Hertha BSC Berlin in the first round. Returning to the competition in the following season Langerwehe defeated fellow amateur club VfB Coburg in the first round, FV Würzburg 04 in the second and VfL Osnabrück in the third to finally being knocked out by MSV Duisburg in the round of sixteen. The 1978–79 DFB-Pokal was less successful for the club, being knocked out in the first round by VfR Heilbronn. In 1979–80 TuS Langerwehe defeated Rot-Weiß Hasborn in the first round of the Cup and Eintracht Trier in the second. For the third round it drew Bundesliga club Hertha BSC Berlin again and managed a nil-all draw in Berlin to then defeat Hertha 2–1 in the replay in Langerwehe in front of 14,000. The club then advanced to the round of sixteen for a second time but lost to SpVgg Bayreuth in extra time. Making its sixth appearance in the competition in 1980–81 the club defeated SV Stuttgart-Rot in the first round before being knocked out by Borussia Mönchengladbach in the second. The club made its final German Cup appearance in 1999–2000 where it lost 6–0 to Chemnitzer FC in the second round after a bye in the first.

Withdrawn from competitive football in November 1999 because of financial reasons the club entered a three-year hiatus before returning to league football again in 2002. TuS Langerwehe had to restart at lower amateur level, where it plays today. In recent seasons it has been fluctuating between the tier eight Kreisliga A and tier nine Kreisliga B until 2015 when it won promotion to Bezirksliga.

== Honours ==
The club's honours:

- Verbandsliga Mittelrhein
  - Champions: 1982, 1990, 1994
  - Runners-up: 1976, 1997
- Landesliga Mittelrhein 2
  - Champions: 1973
