= ETL Group =

- Company type: Group of companies, the most prominent being: ETL AG Steuerberatungsgesellschaft; ETL AG Wirtschaftsprüfungsgesellschaft; ETL Rechtsanwälte GmbH
- Industry: Tax and Legal advice, Auditing, Management consultancy, Financial services
- Founded: 1971
- Headquarters: Essen / Berlin, Germany
- Key people: Franz-Josef Wernze (CEO)
- Revenue: over €950 million (total revenue in 2019)
- Number of employees: 10,000 (2020)
- Website: www.etl.de

The ETL Group is a multinational group of companies providing tax, legal, auditing and management consultancy services. It is Germany's largest tax advisory company, with an annual turnover of over €950 million (2019), putting it among the top five auditing and tax advisory companies in the Federal Republic.

The ETL Group employs 10,000 partners and staff, including more than 1,500 tax advisors, lawyers, auditors and management consultants. Currently, the group has some 200,000 clients in about 870 offices across Germany. Additionally, the ETL Group operates in almost 50 countries throughout the world under the "ETL Global" brand.

== History ==
At the beginning of the 1970s, Franz-Josef Wernze and Klaus F. K. Schmidt joined forces to open a tax advisory office. The services they offered were soon extended beyond mere tax advice. Wernze and Schmidt took a holistic approach that combined tax advice with auditing and legal services in a one-stop consultancy package. Since 1995, the group of companies providing these services has been operating under the "ETL" brand.

== Services ==
felix1.de Logo

The ETL Group offers consultancy services for private individuals, freelancers as well as small and medium-sized enterprise. These services are available for all questions regarding tax, legal, economic, organizational and financial issues. Customized consultancy and strategy concepts have been developed for petrol station proprietors, health care professionals, hotel and restaurant owners, farmers and foresters, franchising, senior citizens and professional athletes.

The felix1.de AG Steuerberatungsgesellschaft, launched in 2014, focuses on target groups with a higher affinity for the online world and complements classical consultancy services with digital components such as online identification.

== Group Structure ==
Under the holding company ETL AG Steuerberatungsgesellschaft, Essen, the ETL Group is the largest tax advisory company in Germany. Within the Group it is the ETL AG Steuerberatungsgesellschaft together with subsidiaries

- Freund & Partner GmbH Steuerberatungsgesellschaft, Berlin,
- RCU Vermögensverwaltung AG, Essen, and
- eurodata AG, Saarbrücken,

that carry out the central holding functions. These include, for instance, key strategic decisions as well as the financial, investment and risk management for the whole group.

Tax advisory services are pooled in the Freund & Partner GmbH Steuerberatungsgesellschaft corporate division, whereas sector-specific software as well as data centre capacities are provided in an independent corporate division under the leadership of eurodata AG. The RCU Vermögensverwaltung division also provides complementary consultancy and financial services with a focus on professional tax advisors as its target group.

The Group's legal advice sector and auditing activities are coordinated by ETL Rechtsanwälte GmbH, Essen, together with ETL AG Wirtschaftsprüfungsgesellschaft, Berlin.

Under the brand "ETL Global" ETL's international partners cooperate in more than 250 offices worldwide whenever their clients need advice on cross-border activities. Apart from this cooperation network, "ETL Global" also encompasses the shareholdings of the ETL Group in European markets, such as Austria, the Czech Republic, Spain, Poland, Great Britain and the Netherlands.

== Social Responsibility and Sports Sponsorship ==
In 2008 the ETL foundation "Kinderträume" was created. Since then over 200 projects have been carried out across Germany to support children in need as well as sick children and teenagers. The ETL Group is also actively involved in the promotion of popular and professional sports via a division which is a separate entity from the consultancy services within the group.

== Literature ==
- ETL – European Tax & Law, Essen 2010, ISBN 978-3-00-033425-2
- ETL - 25 Jahre Freund und Partner, 2016, ISBN 978-3-00-052083-9
