= SV Blau-Weiss Alsdorf =

German football club

SV Blau-Weiß Alsdorf
- Full name: Sportvereinigung Blau-Weiß Alsdorf e.V. 1910/16
- Founded: 2004 (1910/16)
- Ground: Göbbelstadion Schaufenberger Straße
- Capacity: 6,000
- League: Kreisliga D Aachen Staffel 3 (XI)
- 2015–16: 5th

Sportvereinigung Viktoria Alsdorf was a German football club from Alsdorf, North Rhine-Westphalia. The club was formed out of 19 June 1949 merger of Alsdorfer Sportvereinigung (established 22 June 1919) and Sport-Club Viktoria 1916 Kellersberg. In 2004, SV Viktoria Alsdorf joined Rhenania 1910 Alsdorf to create current day club SV Blau-Weiß Alsdorf 1910/16.

== History ==
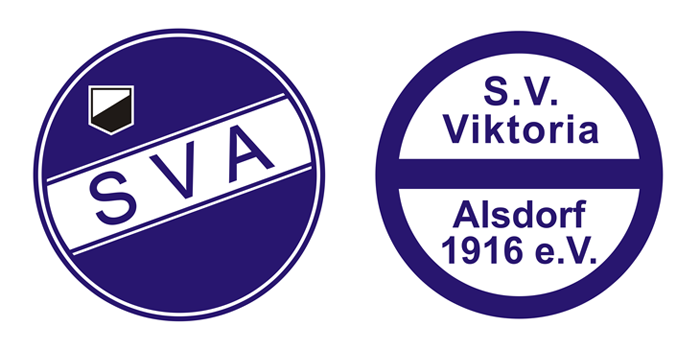
Historical logos of SV Viktoria Alsdorf.

Prior to the union Kellersberg played two seasons in the Amateurliga Mittelrhein (II). The newly merged side became part of the 2. Liga-West (II) in 1949, but spent only a single season there before displaced due to financial problems. Through 1950s and into the early 1960s Viktoria played in what had become the third tier Amateurliga Mittelrhein. Generally a lower table side, they did finish first in Staffel B in 1952, but lost the playoff for the overall division title. The team went on that season to take part in the national amateur championship and were put out in the second qualifying round.

Following the restructuring of German football in 1963, Viktoria continued to compete in the Amateurliga Mittelrhein (III) before losing a relegation playoff to BC Efferen in 1966 and slipping into lower level play. The team reappeared for a single season turn in the Amateurliga in 1971–72.

Today he club plays in the tier eleven Kreisliga D.
