= VfL Leverkusen =

German football club

- Full name: Verein für Leibesübungen Leverkusen 04/14 e.V.
- Founded: 1950
- Dissolved: 2017
- Ground: Tannenbergstraße
- Capacity: 2,000
Home colours	Away colours

VfL Leverkusen was a German association football club from the central district of Küppersteg in the city of Leverkusen, North Rhine-Westphalia.

== History ==
The club was the product of the 25 July 1950 union of Turn- und Sport 1904 Manfort, established 21 June 1904 as Ballspielverein Manfort, and Turn- und Sport Jahn 1914 Küppersteg, established 15 February 1914. Küppersteg played the 1949–50 season in the Amateurliga Mittelrhein (II); the newly combined side took up their place and competed there through the early- to mid 50s before slipping into the Landesliga Mittelrhein (III).

League re-structuring saw the club sent down to fourth division play in 1956. VfL returned to the Amateurliga Mittlerhein (III) in 1964 for a two-season turn before falling back through the Landesliga Mittelrhein (IV) into lower division play by 1966. They returned to the Landesliga in 1972 and narrowly escaped relegation in each of the next several seasons until finally being sent down in 1977.

Leverkusen finally recovered a place in the Landesliga Mittelrhein in 2003, capturing the division title that same year, winning immediate promotion to the Verbandsliga Mittelrhein (IV). In 2008 the club won the Verbandsliga championship but was not promoted as that league and others below it were downgraded by one level with the foundation of the 3. Liga. Verbandsliga Mittelrhein was renamed Mittelrheinliga where the club remained for three more seasons before it went down to Landesliga 1 (VI). Three more seasons were spent there before Leverkusen finished second in 2014 for a return to the renamed Oberliga Mittelrhein. The club was relegated back to the Landesliga at the end of the 2015–16 season.

In February 2017, the club was declared insolvent and, consequently, withdrew from competitions thereafter. Results from its previous games in the Landesliga were expunged while its remaining fixtures were cancelled and the club was placed last in the table. It later closed down in March and a successor, SC Leverkusen, was founded to inherit VfL's youth department.

== Honours ==
The club's honours:

- Landesliga Mittelrhein (VI)
  - Champions: 2003
- Verbandsliga Mittelrhein (V)
  - Champions: 2008

== Notable players ==
- Jens Hegeler
- Bahadir Incilli
- Sascha Marquet
