= Middle Rhine Cup =

- Region: Middle Rhine, North Rhine-Westphalia, Germany
- Qualifier for: DFB-Pokal
- Current champions: Viktoria Köln (2025–26)
- Most championships: Viktoria Köln (9 titles)

The Middle Rhine Cup (German: Mittelrheinpokal) is a German football club Cup competition open to teams from the Lower Rhine region of the state of North Rhine-Westphalia. The competition is one of the 21 regional cup competitions of German football and acts as a qualifier to the following seasons' German Cup.

The competition is sponsored by the Bitburger brewery and carries the official name Bitburger Mittelrheinpokal. It is operated by the Middle Rhine Football Association, the FVM.

== Modus ==
Clubs from fully professional leagues are not permitted to enter the competition, meaning, no teams from the Fußball-Bundesliga and the 2nd Bundesliga can compete.

All clubs from the Middle Rhine playing in the 3. Liga (III) and the Regionalliga West (IV) are directly qualified for the first round, the remaining places are filled with the teams who qualified from local cup competitions, the Kreispokale. All up, 32 clubs take part in the first round of the competition.

Since the establishment of the 3. Liga in 2008, reserve teams can not take part in the German Cup or the Middle Rhine Cup anymore.

== Winners ==
The winners of the competition since 1993:

Club	Wins	Years
FC Viktoria Köln	9	2014, 2015, 2016, 2018, 2021, 2022, 2023, 2025, 2026
Alemannia Aachen	6	1993, 1994, 1997, 1999, 2019, 2024
Bayer Leverkusen II	5	1996, 1998, 2000, 2003, 2007
TSV Germania Windeck	3	2009, 2010, 2011
1. FC Köln Amateure	3	1995, 2004, 2005
Alemannia Aachen II	2	2002, 2006
Bonner SC	1	2017
SC Fortuna Köln	1	2013
FC Hennef 05	1	2012
FC Wegberg-Beeck	1	2008
Blau-Weiß Brühl	1	2001
1. FC Düren	1	2020
