= VfL Köln 99 =

German football club

VfL Köln 1899
- Full name: Verein für Leibesübungen 1899 e.V. Köln
- Founded: 6 May 1899 (as IFC Cöln); 13 July 1937 (merger)
- Dissolved: 1 July 2013
- 2012–13: Kreisliga C4 Köln, 9th
| Home colours | Away colours |

VfL Köln was a German association football club from the city of Cologne, North Rhine-Westphalia. The club was formed out of the pre-war merger of Kölner Club für Rasenspiele and Kölner Sport-Club 1899, through which it lays claim to being the city's oldest football club.

== History ==
Following the union of the two clubs, VfL took up the place of predecessor SC in the Gauliga Mittelrhein, one of sixteen top flight divisions formed in the re-organization of German football under the Third Reich in 1933. The club was moderately successful there, capturing the division title in 1941 before moving on to take part in the national playoff rounds. They were eliminated in a semi-final match by eventual vice-champions Schalke 04 (4–1) and lost the subsequent third place match to Dresdner SC by the same score.

As World War II progressed it forced German football competition to become more local in character and the Gauliga Mittelrhein was broken up. VfL became part of the Gauliga Köln-Aachen and won its second consecutive title there. They were put out of national level competition when they lost a quarterfinal contest to Kickers Offenbach (3–1). The team made appearances in 1939, 1941, and 1942 in early round play for the Tschammerpokal, predecessor to today's DFB-Pokal (German Cup).

In 1943, the club became part of the wartime side Kriegspielgemeinshaft VfL 99/Sülz 07 Köln in partnership with SpVgg Sülz 07. The combined side repeated as Gauliga Köln-Aachen champions and were again eliminated in a national quarterfinal, this time by KSG Spielverein/48-99 Duisburg (0–2).

VfL resumed play as an independent side following the war, and after a season in the Bezirksliga Rheinbezirk, joined the 2. Oberliga West (II) for the 1950–51 season. The following year the first team side of SC West Köln became part of VfL, which then played a single season as Spielgemeinschaft SC Köln 99 before readopting its original name. The side took up play in the Amateurliga Mittelrhein (III) where they earned mid-to-lower table results.

After the formation of the Bundesliga and new second division Regionalliga in 1963, the Amateurliga became a third-tier competition below those leagues, where the VfL continued to earn indifferent results. A fifteenth-place finish in 1980 dropped the club to lower level local competition. The team played in the Kreisliga A Köln, where it finished second in the 2007–08 season. In 2009 it was sent down to Kreisliga B2 and the next year was sent down again to C4. The VfL ended at ninth place in its final season before it merged with FSV Köln-Nord 1991 to form 1. FSV Köln 1899 in July 2013.

== Honours ==
as VfL Köln

- Gauliga Mittelrhein (I) champions: 1941
- Gauliga Köln-Aachen (I) champions: 1942

as KSG VfL 99/Sülz 07 Köln

- Gauliga Köln-Aachen (I) champions: 1943

== Notable players ==
- Alfons Moog, 7 caps 1939–40
- Willi Bars
