= Germania Teveren =

- Full name: Fußballclub Germania 1910 Teveren e.V.
- Founded: 1910
- Ground: Heidestadion
- Capacity: 7,000
- Chairman: Paulus Frank
- Manager: Dave Roemgens
- League: Landesliga Mittelrhein 2 (VI)
- 2015–16: 9th
Home colours	Away colours

The Germania Teveren is a German association football club from the Teveren suburb of Geilenkirchen, North Rhine-Westphalia.

The club's greatest success has been to earn promotion to the tier three Regionalliga West/Südwest in 1996, where it played for two seasons.

== History ==
Germania Teveren was formed in 1910 and, for most of its history, has been a non-descript amateur side in local football.

The club's rise began in the early 1980s when it won promotion to the Bezirksliga for the first time, followed by promotion to the Landesliga Mittelrhein in 1985. Germania moved between those two league for the next decade until it earned promotion to the Verbandsliga Mittelrhein in 1992 and to the Oberliga after a championship in the former the following season.

Germania played the next three seasons in the Oberliga Nordrhein, coming eleventh in its first season there. The club greatly improved after this, coming fourth in 1995 and winning the league in 1996. The later also allowed the club direct promotion to the Regionalliga for the first time.

In the Regionalliga West/Südwest from 1996 to 1998 the club came twelfth in its first season there but finished last the year after, ending the Germania's spell in the third division. Back in the Oberliga Germania came ninth in 1999 but was relegated in 2000 after a sixteenth place. It remained in the Verbandsliga until 2003 when it dropped back to the Landesliga for a season.

The club dropped out of the Verbandsliga again in 2006, playing in the Landesliga for two seasons. From 2008 to 2011 it returned to the Verbandsliga but was relegated once more and now plays in the Landesliga.

== Honours ==
The club's honours:

- Oberliga Nordrhein
  - Champions: 1996
- Verbandsliga Mittelrhein
  - Champions: 1993
  - Runners-up: 2005, 2009
- Landesliga Mittelrhein 2
  - Champions: 2004, 2008
  - Runners-up: 1992

== Recent seasons ==
The recent season-by-season performance of the club:

Season	Division	Tier	Position
1999–2000	Oberliga Nordrhein	IV	16th ↓
2000–01	Verbandsliga Mittelrhein	V	10th
2001–02	Verbandsliga Mittelrhein	V	8th
2002–03	Verbandsliga Mittelrhein	V	14th ↓
2003–04	Landesliga Mittelrhein-2	VI	1st ↑
2004–05	Verbandsliga Mittelrhein	V	2nd
2005–06	Verbandsliga Mittelrhein	V	16th ↓
2006–07	Landesliga Mittelrhein-2	VI	3rd
2007–08	Landesliga Mittelrhein-2	VI	1st ↑
2008–09	Verbandsliga Mittelrhein	VI	2nd
2009–10	Verbandsliga Mittelrhein	VI	7th
2010–11	Verbandsliga Mittelrhein	VI	13th ↓
2011–12	Landesliga Mittelrhein-2	VII	6th
2012–13	Landesliga Mittelrhein-2	VI	4th
2013–14	Landesliga Mittelrhein-2	VI	9th
2014–15	Landesliga Mittelrhein-2	VI	7th
2015–16	Landesliga Mittelrhein-2	VI	9th
2016–17	Landesliga Mittelrhein-2	VI	

- With the introduction of the Regionalligas in 1994 and the 3. Liga in 2008 as the new third tier, below the 2. Bundesliga, all leagues below dropped one tier.

=== Key ===
↑ Promoted	↓ Relegated
