= TSV Germania Windeck =

German football club

- Full name: Turn- und Sportverein Germania Windeck
- Nickname(s): Die Wöchste
- Founded: 1910
- Ground: Germania Sportpark
- Capacity: 1,000
- Chairman: Heinz Georg Willmeroth
- Manager: Marcus Voike
- League: Mittelrheinliga (V)
- 2015–16: 12th
Home colours	Away colours

TSV Windeck Germania is a German association football club from the municipality of Windeck in the district of Rhein-Sieg, North Rhine-Westphalia. It was formed through the merger in June 2009 of FC Germania Dattenfeld, 1. Windeck FC and TSV Dreisel. In addition to its football side, the club has departments for judo, tennis, women's gymnastics, and volleyball.

== History ==
Predecessor FC Germania Dattenfeld was founded in 1910 and first came to note with the advance of its football side to the Landesliga Mittelrhein (VI) in 1999, where they captured the title in 2001 to win promotion to the Verbandsliga Mittelrhein (V). Germania continued to deliver strong performances, earning a vice championship in its debut season in fifth-tier play and a succession of upper-table finishes in subsequent seasons. In 2007 the club rose to the Oberliga Nordrhein (IV) on the strength of a Verbandsliga title. The rapid climb by the club out of Bezirksliga C-Klasse football is credited to Chairman Heinz Georg Willmeroth and his friend and the club's main sponsor, Franz-Josef Wernze.

Partners 1. Windeck FC and TSV Dreisel were both established in 1919 and have only ever played in lower-level local competition.

Currently the club plays in the tier five Oberliga Mittelrhein.

== Honours ==
The club's honours:

- Verbandsliga Mittelrhein (V)
  - Champions: 2007
- Landesliga Mittelrhein I (VI)
  - Champions: 2001
- Middle Rhine Cup
  - Winners: 2009, 2010, 2011

== Stadium ==
The club plays its home matches in the Germania Dattenfelder Sports Park which has a capacity of 1,000. A grandstand with seating for 150 is planned.

In August 2007 the club made headlines when, in the third match of the season, the goalkeeper of visiting SV Straelen noticed the crossbar was too low. A measurement showed the goal 14–17 cm lower than the required 2.44 m. Straelen officially protested their 0–4 loss but were initially denied. In November 2007, following an appeal of the original decision, the match was ordered replayed.

== Notable coaches ==
- Hermann-Josef Werres
- Michael Boris
