= FC Wegberg-Beeck =

German football club

- Full name: Fußball Club Wegberg-Beeck 1920 e.V.
- Founded: February 1920
- Ground: Waldstadion Beeck
- Capacity: 5,000
- Chairman: Günter Stroinski
- Manager: Friedel Henßen
- League: Mittelrheinliga (V)
- 2025–26: Oberliga Mittelrhein, 6th of 16
- Website: http://www.fc-wegberg-beeck.de/
Home colours	Away colours

FC Wegberg-Beeck is a German association football club from the town of Wegberg, North Rhine-Westphalia. The club's greatest success has been promotion to the tier four Regionalliga West four times since 2015.

The club has also taken part in the first round of the DFB-Pokal, the German Cup, on one occasion, courtesy of a Middle Rhine Cup win.

== History ==
The club was formed as Sportvereins 1920 Beeck in February 1920, became SC Beeck after the Second World War and adopted its current name in July 1996.

SC Beeck began its rise from local amateur level in 1993 when it won promotion to the Landesliga Mittelrhein followed by promotion to the Verbandsliga Mittelrhein the year after. The club won promotion to the Oberliga Nordrhein after a runners-up finish in the Verbandsliga in 1996 and achieved good results in its first three seasons there, a third-place finish in 1999 as its best result. The following three seasons the team gradually declined and was eventually relegated in 2002. It had to drop to the tier six Landesliga Mittelrhein for a season in 2002–03 but quickly recovered.

Returning to the tier five Verbandsliga Mittelrhein from 2003 the club finished seventh in its first season but won the league the year after. It was promoted to the Oberliga Nordrhein once more but lasted for only one season before dropping back down in 2006. Four more Verbandsliga seasons followed in which FC Wegberg-Beeck finished third in the first but then slipped to mid-table finishes for the next two. It qualified for the 2008–09 DFB-Pokal after a Middle Rhine Cup win the season before, but lost 4–1 to Alemannia Aachen in the first round. In 2009–10 it took out its second Verbandsliga title and moved up to NRW-Liga, the Oberliga Nordrhein having been disbanded in favour of a statewide league.

Again the club lasted only one season before being relegated again and returning to the Verbandsliga in 2011. After the 2011–12 season the NRW-Liga was disbanded after only four seasons and the Verbandsliga Mittelrhein took its place in the Middle Rhine region, becoming the Mittelrheinliga. The club played in this league until 2015 when a league championship earned it promotion to the Regionalliga West but lasted for just one season at Regionalliga level before being relegated again. Since 2015 the club has experienced repeated promotions and relegations between the Mittelrheinliga and the Regionalliga West.

== Current squad ==
As of 1 February 2024

Note: Flags indicate national team as defined under FIFA eligibility rules; some limited exceptions apply. Players may hold more than one non-FIFA nationality.

No.	Pos.	Nation	Player
1	GK	GER	Ron Meyer
2	DF	GER	Norman Post
3	DF	JPN	Takahito Ohno
4	DF	GER	Nils Hühne
5	DF	GER	Maurice Pluntke
6	MF	GER	Joel Cartus
7	MF	GER	Francisco San Jose
8	MF	KOS	Adrijan Behrami
9	FW	GER	Shpend Hasani
10	FW	GER	Marc Kleefisch
11	MF	GER	Timo Braun
13	GK	GER	Tobias Müller
15	MF	JPN	Toranosuke Abe
16	MF	ARG	Julio Torrens

No.	Pos.	Nation	Player
17	DF	GER	Sebastian Wilms
18	DF	GER	Leon Pesch
19	FW	GER	Finn Stromberg
20	FW	GER	Edwin-Bate Hope
21	DF	GER	Mathias Hülsenbusch
22	MF	GER	Finn Theißen
23	DF	GER	Justin Hoffmanns
24	MF	AUS	Alec Vinci
25	DF	GER	Edward Tetteh Ayertey
26	GK	GER	Yannik Hasenbein
27	MF	GER	Niklas Fensky
28	DF	GER	Merlin Schlosser (on loan from Hessen Kassel)
31	MF	GER	Yannik Leersmacher
—	FW	GER	Timo Bornemann (on loan from Energie Cottbus)

== Honours ==
The club's honours:

=== League ===
- Mittelrheinliga
  - Champions: 2015, 2017, 2020
  - Runners-up: 2014, 2019, 2023
- Verbandsliga Mittelrhein
  - Champions: 2005, 2010
  - Runners-up: 1996, 2012
- Landesliga Mittelrhein 2
  - Champions: 2003

=== Cup ===
- Middle Rhine Cup
  - Winners: 2008
  - Runners-up: 2014

== Recent seasons ==
The recent season-by-season performance of the club:

Season	Division	Tier	Position
2003–04	Verbandsliga Mittelrhein	V	7th
2004–05	Verbandsliga Mittelrhein	V	1st ↑
2005–06	Oberliga Nordrhein	IV	17th ↓
2006–07	Verbandsliga Mittelrhein	V	3rd
2007–08	Verbandsliga Mittelrhein	V	11th
2008–09	Verbandsliga Mittelrhein	VI	8th
2009–10	Verbandsliga Mittelrhein	VI	1st ↑
2010–11	NRW-Liga	V	14th ↓
2011–12	Verbandsliga Mittelrhein	VI	2nd
2012–13	Mittelrheinliga	V	7th
2013–14	Mittelrheinliga	V	2nd
2014–15	Mittelrheinliga	V	1st ↑
2015–16	Regionalliga West	IV	19th ↓
2016–17	Mittelrheinliga	V	1st ↑
2017–18	Regionalliga West	IV	16th ↓
2018–19	Mittelrheinliga	V	2nd
2019–20	Mittelrheinliga	V	1st ↑
2020–21	Regionalliga West	IV	17th
2021–22	Regionalliga West	IV	17th ↓
2022–23	Mittelrheinliga	V	2nd ↑
2023–24	Regionalliga West	IV	17th ↓

- With the introduction of the Regionalligas in 1994 and the 3. Liga in 2008 as the new third tier, below the 2. Bundesliga, all leagues below dropped one tier.

↑ Promoted	↓ Relegated
