= 2. Oberliga West =

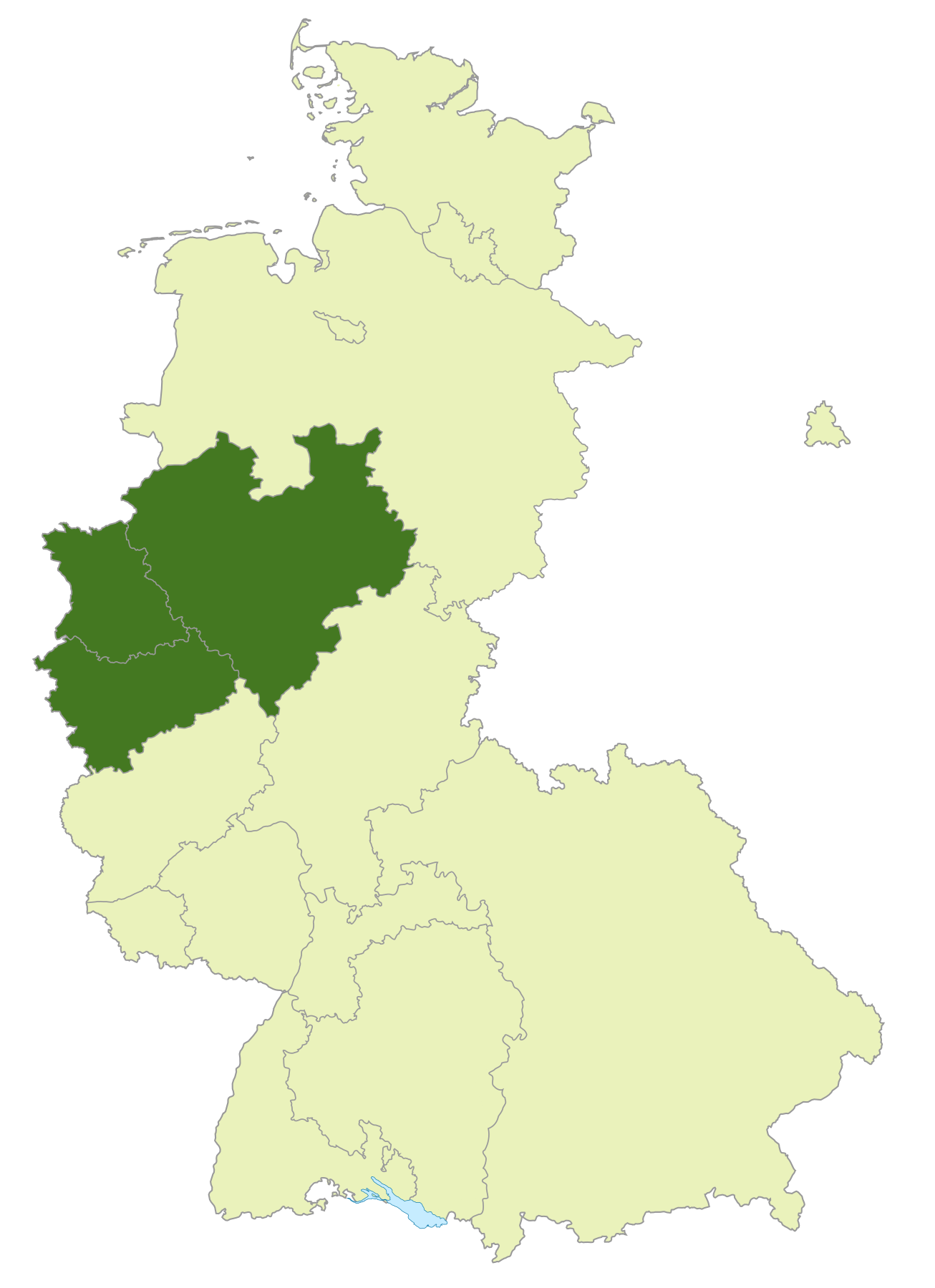
- Founded: 1949
- Folded: 1963 (14 seasons)
- Replaced by: Regionalliga West
- Country: Germany
- State: North Rhine-Westphalia
- Level on pyramid: Level 2
- Promotion to: Oberliga West
- Relegation to: Verbandsliga Niederrhein; Verbandsliga Mittelrhein; Verbandsliga Westfalen 1; Verbandsliga Westfalen 2
- Last champions: VfB Bottrop (1962–63)

The 2. Oberliga West (English: 2nd Premier League West) was the second-highest level of the German football league system in the west of Germany from 1949 until the formation of the Bundesliga in 1963. It covered the state of North Rhine-Westphalia, the most populous state of Germany.

== Overview ==
The 2. Oberliga West was formed in 1949 with two groups of sixteen teams each, as a feeder league to Oberliga West. It was the first of the three 2nd Oberligas, the other two being 2. Oberliga Süd (formed in 1950) and 2. Oberliga Südwest (in 1951). The league adopted a single group format starting from 1952: The top two teams of the 2. Oberliga gained promotion to the Oberliga while the bottom two teams were relegated to the Verbandsliga's. Some years, however, exceptions applied and the number of promoted and relegated teams altered.

In July 1955 the Westdeutscher Fußballverband decided to disband the league from 1956, but the German federation DFB outlawed this decision and the league continued its existence.

Below the 2. Oberliga West ranked the Amateurliga's, varying in numbers (and names) but split into three zones, Niederrhein, Mittelrhein, and Westfalen :

- Niederrhein: Landesliga Niederrhein in two groups until 1952, then three groups. From 1956 single-group Verbandsliga Niederrhein.
- Mittelrhein: Landesliga Mittelrhein in a single group in 1950, two groups from 1951. From 1956 single-group Verbandsliga Mittelrhein.
- Westfalen: Landesliga Westfalen in two groups in 1950, single group in 1951 and 1952, five groups from 1953. From 1956 two groups, Verbandsliga Westfalen 1 and Verbandsliga Westfalen 2.

The 2. Oberliga West existed until 1963, when it was replaced by the Regionalliga West as the second division for North Rhine-Westphalia.

SpVgg Herten is the only team to have played in the league for all 14 seasons.

Schwarz-Weiß Essen became the first second-division side to win the German Cup when they did so in 1959, an achievement later repeated by Kickers Offenbach and Hannover 96 in the history of German football.

== Disbanding of the 2. Oberliga ==
In 1963, the league was disbanded in favor of the new Regionalliga. The first eight teams from this season went to the Regionalliga West. The clubs placed from ninth to sixteenth were relegated to the Verbandsligas.

- VfB Bottrop
- Duisburg 48/99
- SpVgg Herten
- STV Horst-Emscher
- Sportfreunde Siegen
- Rot-Weiß Essen
- Arminia Bielefeld
- Duisburger SV

The following teams were relegated to the Amateurligas:

- To the Verbandsliga Niederrhein: SV Neukirchen, Duisburger FV 08
- To the Verbandsliga Mittelrhein: Bonner FV
- To the Verbandsliga Westfalen-Nordost: Eintracht Gelsenkirchen, Sportfreunde Gladbeck
- To the Verbandsliga Westfalen-Südwest: SC Dortmund 95, SV Sodingen, VfL Bochum

== Winners and runners-up of the 2. Oberliga ==
Season	Winner	Runner-Up
1949–50	Rheydter SV; Sportfreunde Katernberg	Fortuna Düsseldorf; Borussia Mönchengladbach
1950–51	MSV Duisburg; Bayer Leverkusen	Schwarz-Weiß Essen; SSV 04 Wuppertal
1951–52	SV Sodingen; Borussia Mönchengladbach	VfB Bottrop; TSG Vohwinkel
1952–53	VfL Bochum	Rheydter SV
1953–54	Duisburger SV	Westfalia Herne
1954–55	Wuppertaler SV	SV Hamborn 07
1955–56	VfL Bochum	MSV Duisburg
1956–57	SV Hamborn 07	Rot-Weiß Oberhausen
1957–58	STV Horst-Emscher	Borussia Mönchengladbach
1958–59	SV Hamborn 07	Schwarz-Weiß Essen
1959–60	SV Sodingen	TSV Marl-Hüls
1960–61	Schwarz–Weiß Essen	Fortuna Düsseldorf
1961–62	Bayer Leverkusen	Wuppertaler SV
1962–63	VfB Bottrop	Duisburg 48/99

== Placings in the 2. Oberliga West ==
The league placings from 1949 to 1963:

Club	50	51	52	53	54	55	56	57	58	59	60	61	62	63
Westfalia Herne	8	6	6	8	2	W	W	W	W	W	W	W	W	W
MSV Duisburg	4	1	W	W	W	W	2	W	W	W	W	W	W	W
Rot-Weiß Oberhausen	W	W	3	11	4	8	8	2	W	W	W	W	W	W
Borussia Mönchengladbach	2	W	1	W	W	W	W	W	2	W	W	W	W	W
Hamborn 07	W	W	W	10	7	2	W	1	W	1	W	W	W	W
TSV Marl-Hüls						13	6	5	3	7	2	W	W	W
Schwarz-Weiß Essen	7	2	W	W	W	W	W	W	7	2	W	1	W	W
Fortuna Düsseldorf	2	W	W	W	W	W	W	W	W	W	W	2	W	W
Bayer 04 Leverkusen	5	1	W	W	W	W	W	4	4	4	5	3	1	W
Wuppertaler SV *						1	W	W	W	5	3	9	2	W
VfB Bottrop	11		2	7	10	3	3	3	5	6	6	13	11	1
Duisburg 48/99											14	7	9	2
SpVgg Herten	6	13	8	16	5	4	10	9	6	10	7	5	10	3
STV Horst-Emscher	W	W	W	W	W	7	4	6	1	W	10	6	7	4
Sportfreunde Siegen													8	5
Rot-Weiß Essen	W	W	W	W	W	W	W	W	W	W	W	W	5	6
Arminia Bielefeld	W	9	4	6	16									7
Duisburger SV	W	W	3	3	1	W	W	W	W	W	W	W	W	8
SV Sodingen		4	1	W	W	W	W	W	W	W	1	W	W	9
Eintracht Gelsenkirchen *		5	9				5	7	9	3	9	4	4	10
Sportfreunde Gladbeck									10	9	8	8	13	11
SC Dortmund 95								10	14	13	11	14	12	12
SV Neukirchen													6	13
VfL Bochum	12	7	5	1	W	W	1	W	W	W	W	W	3	14
Duisburger FV 08	W	3	16											15
Bonner FV	16										4	10	14	16
VfL Benrath	13	5	14			14			8	8	12	11	15	
SpVgg Erkenschwick	W	W	W	W	11	5	9	15		12	13	12	16	
SSV Hagen		14	11									15		
BV Osterfeld												16		
Union Krefeld	5	13	5	13	8	9	12	8	13	11	15			
Rheydter SV	1	W	W	2	W	10	14	14	12	14	16			
SG Düren 99		11	7	12	13	11	11	13	11	15				
TuS Lintfort										16				
SG Wattenscheid 09	13	10	7	5	3	6	7	12	15					
VfB Marathon Remscheid	4	6	8	9	15		13	11	16					
VfB Speldorf								16						
Rhenania Würselen	W	15	6	15	9	12	15							
VfB Bielefeld		11	14				16							
Sportfreunde Katernberg	1	W	W	W	6	15								
TSG Vohwinkel *	W	4	2	4	12									
SSV Wuppertal *	3	2	4	14	14									
TuRU Düsseldorf	15	10	9											
Hombrucher FV 09	3	15	10											
Preußen Krefeld	9	12	10											
SV Bergisch Gladbach 09	14	3	11											
TuS Essen-West		8	12											
Union Ohligs	14	14	12											
Fortuna Köln		16	13											
Sportfreunde Wanne-Eickel		16	13											
SpVgg Röhlinghausen	9		15											
SC Rapid Köln	6	7	15											
TSV Detmold		12	17											
VfL Köln 99		8												
SC West Köln	7	9												
TuRa Essen	8													
TB Eickel	10													
Alemannia Gelsenkirchen *	10													
VfL Witten	11													
Viktoria Alsdorf	12													
SSV Troisdorf 05	15													
Union Gelsenkirchen *	16													

Source: "2nd Oberliga West". Das deutsche Fussball-Archiv. Archived from the original on 5 January 2008.

=== Key ===
Symbol	Key
W	Oberliga West
1	League champions
Place	League
Blank	Played at a league level below this league

=== Notes ===
- SSV Wuppertal and TSG Vohwinkel merged in 1954 to form Wuppertaler SV.
- Union Gelsenkirchen merged with Alemannia Gelsenkirchen to form Eintracht Gelsenkirchen in 1950.
