= FC Viktoria Köln =

Association football club from Cologne, Germany

Coordinates: 50.946169°N 7.030471°E

Viktoria Köln
- Full name: FC Viktoria Köln 1904 e. V.
- Founded: 1 July 1904; 122 years ago (as FC Germania Kalk); 22 June 2010; 16 years ago (as FC Viktoria Köln)
- Ground: Sportpark Höhenberg
- Capacity: 8,343
- President: Holger Kirsch
- Head coach: Marian Wilhelm
- League: 3. Liga
- 2025–26: 3. Liga, 11th of 20
- Website: www.viktoria1904.de
Home colours	Away colours

FC Viktoria Köln 1904 e. V., commonly known as Viktoria Köln (German pronunciation: [vɪkˈtoːʁi̯a kœln]) or Viktoria Cologne in English, is a German professional football club based on the right bank of the river Rhine in the Höhenberg district of Cologne, North Rhine-Westphalia. The club competes in the 3. Liga, the third tier of German football.

From 1978 to 1981 Viktoria Köln played in the 2. Bundesliga. During this period, the club achieved its best result in the 1979–80 season, finishing 4th.

== History ==
With the oldest parent club of the "Viktoria", the FC Germania Kalk, founded on 1 July 1904 it is one of the oldest football clubs in the city. In 1909 Germania merged with FC Kalk, which was founded in 1905, to form the SV Kalk 04 and in 1911 this club was, in turn, united with Mülheimer FC to create VfR Mülheim-Kalk 04. The club was renamed VfR Köln 04 rrh. in 1918 after the previously independent towns of Kalk and Mülheim were incorporated into Cologne. In 1926 the VfR won its first Western German football championship and entry to the 1926 German football championship.

After the re-organization of German football in 1933 under the Third Reich into sixteen top flight divisions, VfR played in the Gauliga Mittelrhein taking titles there in 1935 and 1937 but then performed poorly at the national level. In 1941 The Gauliga Mittelrhein was split into the Gauliga Moselland and Gauliga Köln-Aachen, with VfR playing in the latter division. Two years later the club joined Mülheimer SV to play as the combined wartime side (Kriegsspielgemeinschaft) KSG VfR 04 Köln/Mülheimer SV 06. Mülheim had also played in the Gauliga Mittelrhein since 1933 claiming titles of its own in 1934 and 1940, and had similarly poor results at the national level. Play in the Gauliga Köln-Aachen was suspended in the 1944–45 season as Allied armies advanced into Germany at the end of World War II.

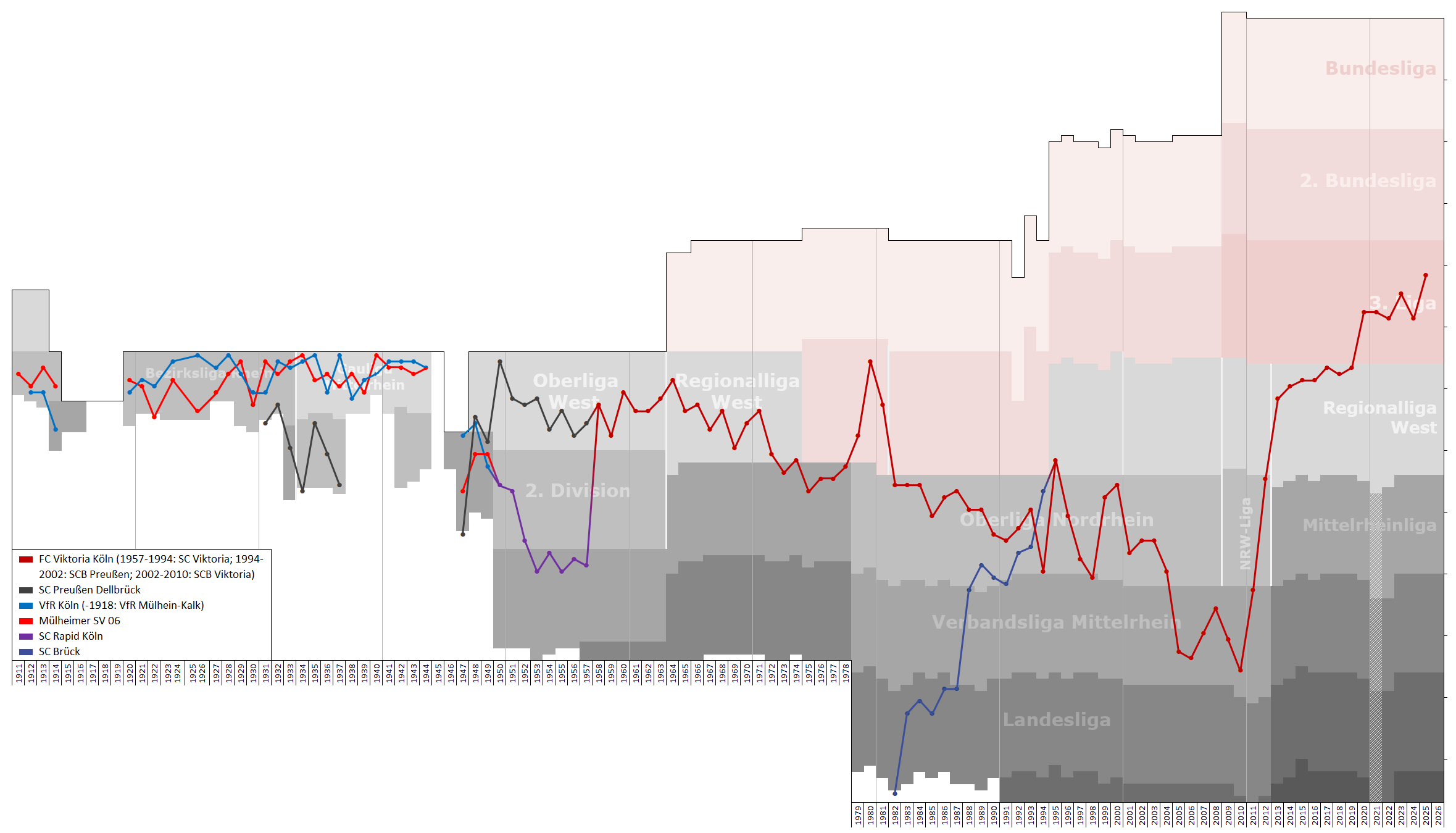
Historical chart of Viktoria Köln and its predecessors' league performance

After the war VfR Köln resumed playing first division football in the Oberliga West, but lasted only a single season before being relegated. In 1949 the team merged with its wartime partner Mülheimer SV to become SC Rapid Köln and played in the 2. Oberliga West (II) until falling to third-tier football after 1952. Rapid joined local rivals SC Preußen Dellbrück forming SC Viktoria 04 Köln in 1957. Of these sides, Preußen Dellbrück was most successful, advancing to the semi-finals of the national championships in 1950 before going out against Kickers Offenbach in a replay of their scoreless first match.

In 1963, the city selected Viktoria as its representative in the Fairs Cup, the forerunner of today's UEFA Cup, but the club was unable to capitalize on the opportunity. The team played as a second and third division side with generally unremarkable results until the 1994 merger with SC Brück that created SCB Preußen Köln, the new team being named after predecessor Preußen Dellbrück. The new club earned a second-place finish in their division in 2000, but quickly tumbled to the Oberliga Nordrhein (IV), even spending one season in fifth division Verbandsliga Mittelrhein. The pattern continued after the team was re-christened SCB Viktoria Köln in 2002. Just two years later, Viktoria was relegated to the Verbandsliga (V). In the 2009/10 season the team was relegated to the Landesliga (VI). The SCB Viktoria filed for insolvency on 1 August in 2010.

On 22 June 2010, a new club called FC Viktoria Köln was founded which took over the youth teams of now insolvent SCB Viktoria Köln. Although it was expected that the new club can begin in the Landesliga, where SCB Viktoria had played at last, they were forced by the association to start in the lowest league, Kreisliga D. Nonetheless, on 24 February 2011 the members of the FC Viktoria decided to incorporate the spun-off senior football department of FC Junkersdorf into the new club. Junkersdorf became champion of the 2010–11 Mittelrheinliga and so FC Viktoria Köln could start in 2011–12 in the NRW-Liga.

Viktoria became champions of the 2011–12 NRW-Liga with a one-point lead over Sportfreunde Siegen and was also crowned top scorer with Mike Wunderlich, who scored 32 goals. The title led to promotion to the Regionalliga West (IV).

On 29 April 2017, Viktoria became champions of the Regionalliga West on match day 31 of the 2016–17 season. Viktoria lost the home match in the promotion round to the 3. Liga against Carl Zeiss Jena 2:3, and although the club managed a 1:0 win in Jena, Viktoria missed out on promotion due to the away goals rule.

In the last home game of the 2018–19 Regionalliga West season on 18 May 2019, Viktoria Köln won 1:0 against Borussia Mönchengladbach II to gain promotion to the 3. Liga.

== Crest ==
Viktoria Köln predecessor logos
VfR Köln rrh.

Mülheimer SV 06

SC Rapid Köln

SC Preussen Dellbrück

SC Brück
Viktoria Köln logo history
1957–1994

1994–2002

2002–2007

2007–2010

2010–present

== Honours ==
- Regionalliga West (IV)
  - Champions: 2016–17, 2018–19
  - Runners-up: 2017–18
- NRW-Liga (V)
  - Champions: 2011–12
- Verbandsliga Mittelrhein
  - Champions: 1977–78 (III), 1997–98 (V)
- Middle Rhine Cup (Tiers III–V)
  - Winners: 1986, 1990, 2014, 2015, 2016, 2018, 2021, 2022, 2023, 2025, 2026

== Players ==
=== Current squad ===
As of 3 September 2026

Note: Flags indicate national team as defined under FIFA eligibility rules; some limited exceptions apply. Players may hold more than one non-FIFA nationality.

No.	Pos.	Nation	Player
1	GK	GER	Arne Schulz
6	MF	GER	Tobias Eisenhuth
7	MF	GER	Yannick Tonye
8	MF	GER	Taylan Duman
9	FW	GER	Jakob Sachse (on loan from Schalke 04)
10	FW	GER	David Otto
11	MF	GER	Eric Gueye
12	GK	GER	David Wyciok
15	DF	GER	Christoph Greger (captain)
16	MF	GER	Niklas Jahn
17	MF	GER	Marco Pledl
18	MF	GER	Tim Kloss
19	DF	GER	Meiko Sponsel

No.	Pos.	Nation	Player
20	MF	GER	Niklas Swider (on loan from Borussia Mönchengladbach)
21	MF	GER	Lucas Wolf
22	DF	GER	Verthomy Boboy
24	MF	GER	Jason Amann
25	FW	GER	Diego Perri
26	DF	GER	Kilian Jakob
28	DF	AUT	Pascal Fallmann
30	FW	GER	Alexander Prokopenko
36	GK	GER	Oskar Hill
37	FW	CGO	Noah Maboulou (on loan from 1. FC Nürnberg)
39	DF	GER	Felix Albers
44	FW	GER	Niklas Castelle

=== Out on loan ===
Note: Flags indicate national team as defined under FIFA eligibility rules; some limited exceptions apply. Players may hold more than one non-FIFA nationality.

No.	Pos.	Nation	Player
—	DF	GER	Fabian Fricke (at SV Bergisch Gladbach 09 until 30 June 2027)
—	MF	GER	Samuele Carella (at SC Wiedenbrück until 30 June 2027)

== European participations ==
Inter-Cities Fairs Cup/UEFA Cup/UEFA Europa League:

Season	Round	Country	Club	Home	Away	Aggregate
1962–63	1R	(Hungary)	Ferencváros	4–3	1–4	5–7

== Kit suppliers and shirt sponsors ==
Jersey
Period	Kit manufacturer
1978–1979	Erima
1979–1992	Adidas
1993–1998	Diadora
2001–2002	Adidas
2002–2004	Goool.de
2006–2007	Legea
2007–2008	soccolonia
2011–2018	Jako
2018–2021	Puma
2021–2025	Capelli Sport
2025–	Joma

Shirt sponsor (chest)
Period	Sponsor
1984–1990	Küppers Kölsch
1990–1997	OVB Holding
1997–2003	Cologne Bonn Airport
2011–2015	Cologne Bonn Airport
2015/16	Otto Conrad; FIDUM Bau AG (second half of the season)
2016–2019	felix1.de
2019–2023	ETL
2023–	Peynooş

Shirt sponsor (sleeve)
Period	Sponsor
2011–2016	ETL
2016–2019	None
2019–2020	Miscanthus Green Power
2020–	Wintec Autoglas

Shirt sponsor (back)
Period	Sponsor
2021–2023	Vereint! (PSD Bank West Foundation)
2023–2025	ETL
2025–	Oertel & Prümm
