= FC Hennef 05 =

German football club

- Full name: Fußball-Club Hennef 05 e.V.
- Founded: 1 July 2005
- Ground: Stadion im Sportzentrum Hennef
- Capacity: 5,000
- Chairman: Anton Klein
- Manager: Marco Bäumer
- League: Mittelrheinliga (V)
- 2025–26: Oberliga Mittelrhein, 12th of 16
Home colours	Away colours

The FC Hennef 05 is a German association football club from the town of Hennef, North Rhine-Westphalia. Apart from football the club also offers handball as a second sport.

The club's greatest success has been to earn promotion to the tier four Regionalliga West in 2014 but they were relegated after just one season.

== History ==
FC Hennef 05 was formed in 2005 in a merger of two local clubs, TuRa Hennef and FC Geistingen, two local amateur clubs of which TuRa had been the more successful.

The new club took up TuRa's place in the Landesliga Mittelrhein 1 from 2005, a tier six league while Geistingen, playing in the same league that season and relegated gave its place to the new club's reserve team. Hennef won the league in its second season and earned promotion to the Verbandsliga Mittelrhein but lasted for only two seasons before being relegated down again. The club made an immediate return to the Verbandsliga in 2010 after finishing runners-up in the Landesliga. After an eleventh-place finish in 2011 the club entered a more successful era, winning the league in 2012. It also won the Middle Rhine Cup that season and qualified for the first round of the 2012–13 DFB-Pokal where it lost to TSV 1860 Munich.

At the end of the 2011–12 season the German football league system saw some changes, among them the Verbandsliga Mittelrhein being elevated a tier and receiving Oberliga status. Hennef remained at this level rather than being promoted to the Regionalliga West and won the Oberliga in the next two seasons. In 2013 it declined promotion but took it up the following year, entering Regionalliga level football for the first time. It came last in the Regionalliga in 2014–15 and was relegated from the league.

== Honours ==
The club's honours:

- Oberliga Mittelrhein (V)
  - Champions: 2013, 2014, 2023
- Verbandsliga Mittelrhein (VI)
  - Champions: 2012
- Landesliga Mittelrhein 1
  - Champions: 2007
  - Runners-up: 2010
- Middle Rhine Cup
  - Winners: 2012

== Recent seasons ==
The recent season-by-season performance of the club:

Season	Division	Tier	Position
2005–06	Landesliga Mittelrhein 1	VI	3rd
2006–07	Landesliga Mittelrhein 1	VI	1st ↑
2007–08	Verbandsliga Mittelrhein	V	9th
2008–09	Verbandsliga Mittelrhein	VI	14th ↓
2009–10	Landesliga Mittelrhein 1	VII	2nd↑
2010–11	Verbandsliga Mittelrhein	VI	11th
2011–12	Verbandsliga Mittelrhein	VI	1st
2012–13	Mittelrheinliga	V	1st
2013–14	Mittelrheinliga	V	1st ↑
2014–15	Regionalliga West	IV	18th ↓
2015–16	Mittelrheinliga	V	9th
2016–17	Mittelrheinliga	V	13th
2017–18	Mittelrheinliga	V	2nd

- With the introduction of the Regionalligas in 1994 and the 3. Liga in 2008 as the new third tier, below the 2. Bundesliga, all leagues below dropped one tier.

=== Key ===
↑ Promoted	↓ Relegated
