= Bonner SC =

Association football club

- Full name: Bonner Sport-Club 01/04 e.V.
- Founded: 1965
- Ground: Sportpark Nord
- Capacity: 10,164
- Chairman: Matthias Möseler
- Manager: Björn Mehnert
- League: Regionalliga West (IV)
- 2025–26: Regionalliga West, 9th of 18
- Website: https://www.bonner-sc.de
Home colours	Away colours	Third colours

Bonner SC is a German association football club based in Bonn. The club was formed in 1965 through the merger of Bonner FV and Tura Bonn. Its women's football department won the German national championship in 1975.

== History ==
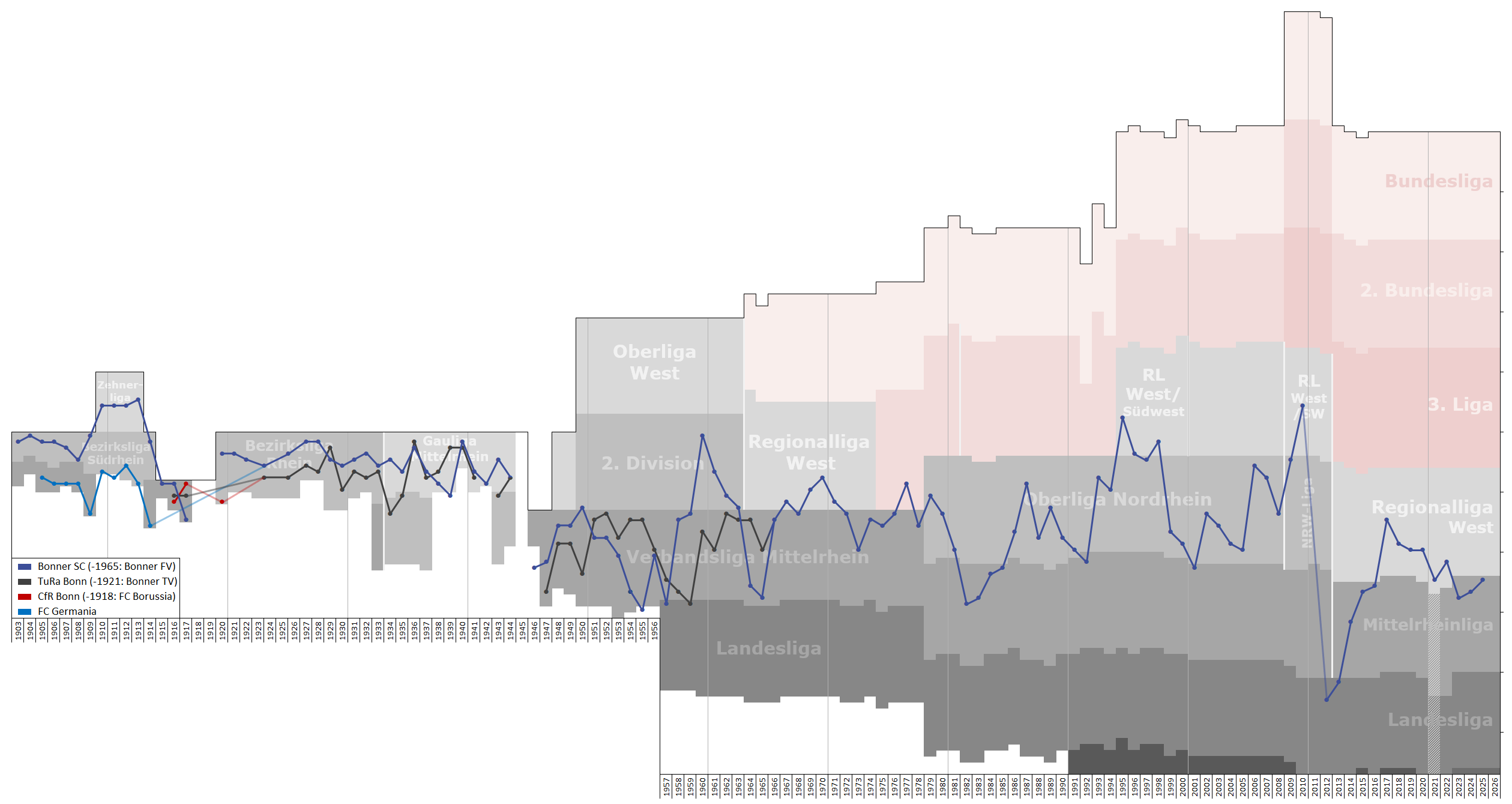
Historical chart of the club's league performance

Bonner FV was founded in 1901 and was known early on as the "Club of Academics" because many of its leaders and members were teachers and professors. The side achieved good results as a tier II team prior to World War II, playing in the tier one Gauliga Mittelrhein at times. In 1959, FV won the Verbandsliga Mittelrhein (III) championship and moved up to 2nd Oberliga West (Division Two West).

Tura was formed in 1925 through a merger of the clubs FC Normannia and FC Borussia and drew its membership from the working class. The combined side's lineage also included the club FC Regina Bonn founded in 1904. Like Bonner FV, Tura played as a tier II team and their greatest success was in winning the 1962 west German amateur championship and their subsequent appearance in the national amateur final, which they lost 0:1 to SC Tegel. Since its founding in 1965, Bonner SC has played as a tier III or IV side except for a handful of seasons spent in various level II leagues between 1966–67 in the Regionalliga West and 1976–77 in the 2. Bundesliga .

=== Cuban connection ===
In 1999, the club drew a lot of attention when then owner Hans-Robert Viol signed the complete Cuba national football team for the remainder of the season with the approval of Cuban leader Fidel Castro, who ordered the players to remain amateurs and only be paid pocket money. They were the first 15 Cuban football players to have a spell abroad during the Castro regime and only four of them were expected to play in the Germans fourth tier side.

In 2000–01, they fell as low as Verbandsliga Mittelrhein (V). Despite the drought of success, Bonner SC were able to muster-up a phenomenal season in the NRW-Liga in the 2008–09 season and become champions leading to their promotion back to the Regionalliga for the 2009–10 Season.

The club had to declare insolvency in July 2010 and was therefore unable to enter the Regionalliga. The team, 7 million euros in debt, was also barred from entering the NRW-Liga as it could not provide the necessary guarantees to prove it would be able to survive financially. Having declared insolvency after the start of the new season, the side could only enter the league below, the Mittelrheinliga, under the condition of being automatically relegated at the end of season, which it declined and paused for a year. Bonner SC entered the tier seven Landesliga Mittelrhein 1 for the 2011–12 season.

From 2014 to 2016 Bonner SC played in the fifth tier of the league system, the Mittelrheinliga. In the 2015–16 season the club won the league and earned promotion to Regionalliga West. In 2021 they got relegated back to the Mittelrheinliga. They got promoted in 2025.

== Current squad ==
As of 8 September 2026

Note: Flags indicate national team as defined under FIFA eligibility rules; some limited exceptions apply. Players may hold more than one non-FIFA nationality.

No.	Pos.	Nation	Player
1	GK	GER	Elias Bördner
2	DF	MLI	Massaman Keita
3	DF	NED	Roman Doulashi
4	DF	MAR	Bilal-Badr Ksiouar
5	MF	GER	Nick Zimmermann
6	MF	NED	Haris Mesic
7	MF	GER	Eray Işık
8	MF	GER	Frederic Baum
9	FW	GER	Çağatay Kader
10	MF	GER	Maximilian Pommer (captain)
11	FW	GER	Luca de Meester
13	FW	GER	Jonas Berg
16	FW	AUS	William McIntosh

No.	Pos.	Nation	Player
17	FW	KOS	Diamant Berisha
18	FW	GER	Aaron Tshimuanga
19	MF	GER	Simon Breuer
20	DF	GER	Yannik Dasbach
21	DF	GER	Marcel Damaschek
22	DF	KEN	Tobias Knost
23	FW	GER	Josue Santo
26	DF	GER	Younes Derbali
27	DF	SRB	Julijan Popović
28	FW	GER	Marzouk Kotya-Fofana
30	GK	GER	Leo Fier
31	GK	GER	Tobias Pawelczyk

=== Staff ===
As of 13 October 2025

- Head coach: Björn Mehnert
- Assistant coach: Gordon Addai
- Assistant coach: Adama Niang
- Goalkeeper coach: Andy Hubert

== Former players ==
- Bekim Kastrati - former Albania international
- Karl Höger - former Germany international
- Albert Bunjaku - former Kosovo and Switzerland international
- Blendi Idrizi - Kosovo international
- Jake Rennie - former Grenada international
- Horacio Troche former Uruguay international

== Honors ==
The club's honours:

=== League ===
- NRW-Liga (V)
  - Champions: 2008–09
- Mittelrheinliga (III/IV/V)
  - Champions: 1958–59, 1961–62, 1967–68, 1971–72, 1975–76, 1984–85, 2000–01, 2015–16, 2024–25
- Landesliga Mittelrhein (V/VI)
  - Champions: 1951–52, 1956–57, 1958–59, 2012–13

=== Cup ===
- Middle Rhine Cup (Tiers III–V)
  - Winners: 2016–2017
