= Mittelrheinliga =

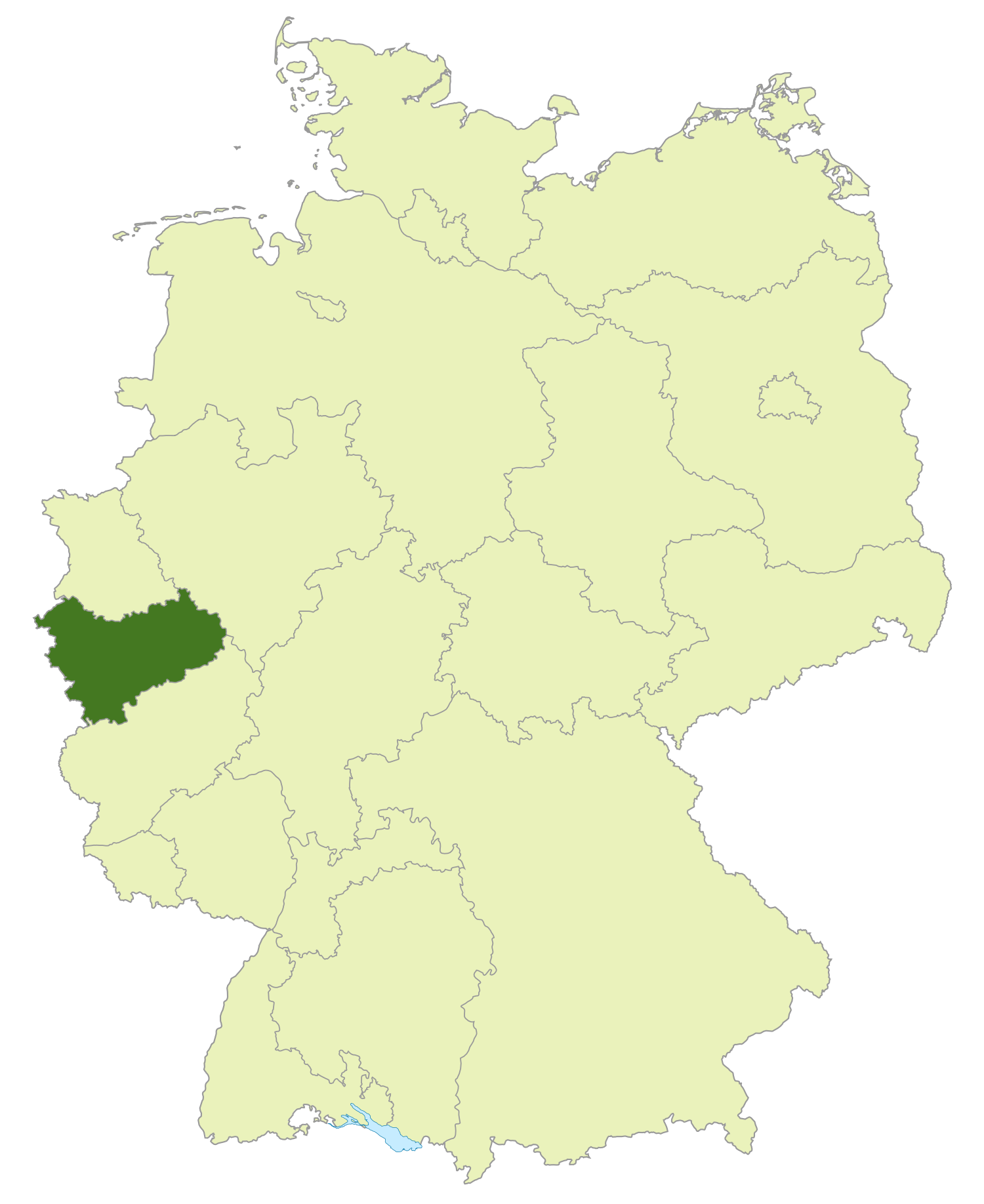
- Organising body: Football Association of the Middle Rhine
- Founded: 1956
- Country: Germany
- State: North Rhine-Westphalia
- Region: Middle Rhine
- Number of clubs: 16
- Level on pyramid: Level 5
- Promotion to: Regionalliga West
- Relegation to: Landesliga Mittelrhein (2 divisions)
- Current champions: Bonner SC (2024–25)
- Current: 2026–27 Oberliga Mittelrhein

The Mittelrheinliga (English: Middle Rhine League), sometimes also referred to as Oberliga Mittelrhein after its elevation to Oberliga status in 2012, is a German amateur football division administered by the Football association of the Middle Rhine, one of the 21 German state football associations. Being the top flight of the Middle Rhine state association, the league is currently a level 5 division of the German football league system.

== Overview ==
Until 1956, a total of ten Landesliga divisions, among them two divisions of Landesliga Mittelrhein were the highest amateur level in the state of North Rhine-Westphalia. After the regular season, the ten Landesliga champions had to play-off for two promotion spots to 2. Oberliga West. Upon decision of the superior Western German football association, in 1956 four divisions of Verbandsliga were introduced, one of them being the Verbandsliga Mittelrhein. These four divisions of Verbandsliga still exist today, with the Verbandsliga Mittelrhein in 2008 renamed to Mittelrheinliga and later in 2012 renamed to Mittelrheinliga.

The Verbandsliga Mittelrhein was upon its inception the third tier of the German football league system. The league champion had to play-off the winners of the Verbandsliga Niederrhein and the two divisions of Verbandsliga Westfalen for two promotion spots to the 2. Oberliga West. Upon introduction of the Bundesliga in 1963, the league was set below the new Regionalliga West but remained as the third tier. With the exception of 1963 and 1974, when the league systems were changed, the champion continued to have the opportunity to win promotion. The clubs from the Verbandsliga Mittelrhein remained mostly unsuccessful as that, only achieving promotion in 1966, 1967, 1968, 1973, 1975, 1976 and 1978.

The league operated with 16 clubs throughout most of its existence, only occasionally altering the numbers to balance out promotion and relegation.

With the replacement of the Regionalliga by the 2nd Bundesliga Nord in 1974, the league champion had to gain promotion through a play-off system with the winners of the other tier-three leagues in northern Germany.

In 1978, the Amateur-Oberliga Nordrhein was formed as the third tier of football in the region compromising the area of the Verbandsliga Mittelrhein and Verbandsliga Niederrhein. One of the main reasons for this move was to provide direct promotion for the tier-three champions again. This season's league winner, Viktoria Köln, was promoted to the 2nd Bundesliga; the clubs placed two to ten in the league were admitted to the new Oberliga, these being:

- SV Baesweiler 09
- Bonner SC
- 1. FC Köln II
- SC Jülich 1910
- TuS Langerwehe
- SV Siegburg 04
- FC Niederembt
- FV Bad Honnef
- Borussia Brand

Verbandsliga Mittelrhein, together with Niederrhein, remained as a feeder league for the new Oberliga, but now as a tier-four competition. Its champion, and some years the runners-up, were directly promoted to the Oberliga Nordrhein.

With the re-introduction of the Regionalligas in 1994, the league slipped to tier five but remained unchanged otherwise.

From 2008, with the introduction of the 3rd Liga, the Verbandsliga Mittelrhein was downgraded to the sixth tier. The league above it was then the new NRW-Liga, a merger of the Oberligas Nordrhein and Westfalen. The champion of the Verbandsliga continued to be directly promoted but since there was now four Verbandsligen below the Oberliga, the runners-up did not have the option of promotion unless the league winner declined.

The NRW-Liga existed for only four seasons before it was disbanded again in 2012 in the wake of the Regionalliga West becoming a league for clubs from North Rhine-Westphalia only. While the Oberliga Westfalen was established again in one half of the state the regions of Lower Rhine and Middle Rhine opted to elevate the Niederrheinliga and Mittelrheinliga to Oberliga status instead of reforming the Oberliga Nordrhein.

== League champions ==
The league champions since 1956:

Season	Club
1956–57	SV Stolberg
1957–58	SSG Bergisch Gladbach
1958–59	Bonner FV
1959–60	SV Baesweiler 09
1960–61	SV Siegburg 04
1961–62	Tura Bonn
1962–63	SG Düren 99
1963–64	SV Schlebusch
1964–65	1. FC Köln II
1965–66	SG Düren 99
1966–67	1. FC Köln II
1967–68	Bonner SC
1968–69	SC Jülich 10
1969–70	SC Jülich 10
1970–71	SC Jülich 10
1971–72	Bonner SC
1972–73	SV Frechen 20
1973–74	Bayer Leverkusen
1974–75	Bayer Leverkusen
1975–76	Bonner SC
1976–77	1. FC Köln II
1977–78	Viktoria Köln

Season	Club
1978–79	Rhenania Richterich
1979–80	SV Frechen 20
1980–81	Bayer Leverkusen II
1981–82	TuS Langerwehe
1982–83	SG Düren 99
1983–84	SV Siegburg 04
1984–85	Bonner SC
1985–86	TuS Lindlar
1986–87	SC Jülich 10
1987–88	SC Brück
1988–89	Alemannia Aachen II
1989–90	TuS Langerwehe
1990–91	SC Brück
1991–92	1. FC Köln II
1992–93	Germania Teveren
1993–94	TuS Langerwehe
1994–95	VfL Rheinbach
1995–96	SSG Bergisch Gladbach
1996–97	Rhenania Würselen
1997–98	SCB Preußen Köln
1998–99	TSC Euskirchen
1999–2000	Borussia Freialdenhoven
2000–01	Bonner SC

Season	Club
2001–02	GFC Düren 09
2002–03	PSI Yurdumspor Köln
2003–04	Alemania Aachen II
2004–05	FC Wegberg-Beeck
2005–06	SSG Bergisch Gladbach
2006–07	Germania Dattenfeld
2007–08	VfL Leverkusen
2008–09	SSG Bergisch Gladbach
2009–10	FC Wegberg-Beeck
2010–11	FC Junkersdorf
2011–12	FC Hennef 05
2012–13	FC Hennef 05
2013–14	FC Hennef 05
2014–15	FC Wegberg-Beeck
2015–16	Bonner SC
2016–17	FC Wegberg-Beeck
2017–18	TV Herkenrath
2018–19	SV Bergisch Gladbach 09
2019–20	FC Wegberg-Beeck
2020–21	None
2021–22	1. FC Düren
2022–23	FC Hennef 05
2023–24	SV Eintracht Hohkeppel

Source:"Verbandsliga Mittelrhein". Das deutsche Fussball-Archiv.

- In 1966, second-placed Bonner SC were promoted instead of SG Düren 99.
- In 1967, second-placed Fortuna Köln were promoted because 1. FC Köln II was ineligible.
- In 1973, second-placed Viktoria Köln were promoted instead of SV Frechen 20.
- In 2008, second-placed Fortuna Köln were promoted because VfL Leverkusen was refused a Regionalliga licence.
- FC Hennef 05 declined promotion in 2012 and 2013 but accepted it in 2014.
- In 2021, the season was curtailed because of the COVID-19 pandemic in Germany, with no champion or promotion.
- In 2023, second-placed FC Wegberg-Beeck were promoted instead of FC Hennef 05.

== Clubs in the Mittelrheinliga since 2012 ==
The final league placings of all clubs in the league since receiving Oberliga status in 2012:

Club	13	14	15	16	17	18	19	20	21	22	23	24
1. FC Düren							8	2	8	1	R	R
FC Wegberg-Beeck	7	2	1	R	1	R	2	1	R	R	2	R
SV Eintracht Hohkeppel											5	1
VfL 08 Vichttal						11	12	10	5	12	3	2
Bonner SC		7	2	1	R	R	R	R	R	R	4	3
SpVg Frechen 20							9	9	9	4	7	4
SV Bergisch Gladbach 09	R	5	10	3	5	10	1	R	R	3	6	5
Siegburger SV 04					10	3	13	5	11	7	13	6
Fortuna Köln II								15	13	13	12	7
TuS Königsdorf											9	8
Borussia Freialdenhoven	3	11	9	6	7	5	4	6	2	5	8	9
FC Hennef 05	1	1	R	9	13	2	3	4	1	2	1	10
FC Hürth	15		4	7	6	9	5	7	3	6	10	11
SpVg Porz												12
FV Bonn-Endenich												13
Union Schafhausen												14
Germania Teveren												15
BC Viktoria Glesch-Paffendorf									10	11	11	
Blau-Weiß Friesdorf				11	8	4	10	14	17	8	14	
FC Pesch						16		3	7	10	15	
Viktoria Arnoldsweiler	4	3	6	8	9	7	11	13	6	9	16	
VfL Alfter	11	6	5	2	3	12	14		4	14		
SV Eilendorf			8	16				16	14	15		
SV Breinig				13		6	6	12	12	16		
SV Deutz 05							7	11	15	17		
SpVg Wesseling-Urfeld	13			10	12	15		8	16	18		
TV Herkenrath				5	2	1	R					
SSV Merten		13				13	15					
TSC Euskirchen	2	8	3	4	4	8	16					
Hilal Bergheim	8	14			11	14						
FC Inde Hahn					14							
VfL Rheinbach					15							
Germania Windeck	6	10	12	12	16							
Alemannia Aachen II	9	4	7	14								
VfL Leverkusen			11	15								
SC Brühl 06/45	5	9	13									
TSV Hertha Walheim	14		14									
FC Bergheim 2000			15									
Germania Erftstadt	12	12	16									
SV Nierfeld		15										
SF Troisdorf 05	10	16										
SG Köln-Worringen	16											

=== Key ===
Symbol	Key
B	Bundesliga (1963–present)
2B	2. Bundesliga (1974–present)
3L	3. Liga (2008–present)
R	Regionalliga West (2008–present)
1	League champions
Place	League
Blank	Played at a league level below this league

== Founding members of the league ==
From the 2. Oberliga West:

- Rhenania Würselen

From the Landesliga Gruppe 1:

- SSV Troisdorf 05
- Rapid Köln
- VfL Köln 99
- SV Habbelrath-Grefrath
- SG Eschweiler
- SV Stolberg
- Tura Hennef

From the Landesliga Gruppe 2:

- SSG Bergisch Gladbach
- SC Fortuna Köln
- FV Godesberg 08
- SV Merkstein
- Viktoria Alsdorf
- BC Kohlscheid
- Tura Bonn
