= 2016–17 Oberliga =

Tournament details
- Country: Germany

Final positions
- Champions: 14 regional winners

The 2016–17 season of the Oberliga was the ninth season of the Oberligas at tier five of the German football league system and the 43nd season overall since reintroduction of the Oberligas in 1974.

The Oberliga is organised in fourteen regional divisions with the league champions promoted to the level above, the Regionalligas while the relegated teams drop down to the Verbandsligas and Landesligas.

== Overview ==
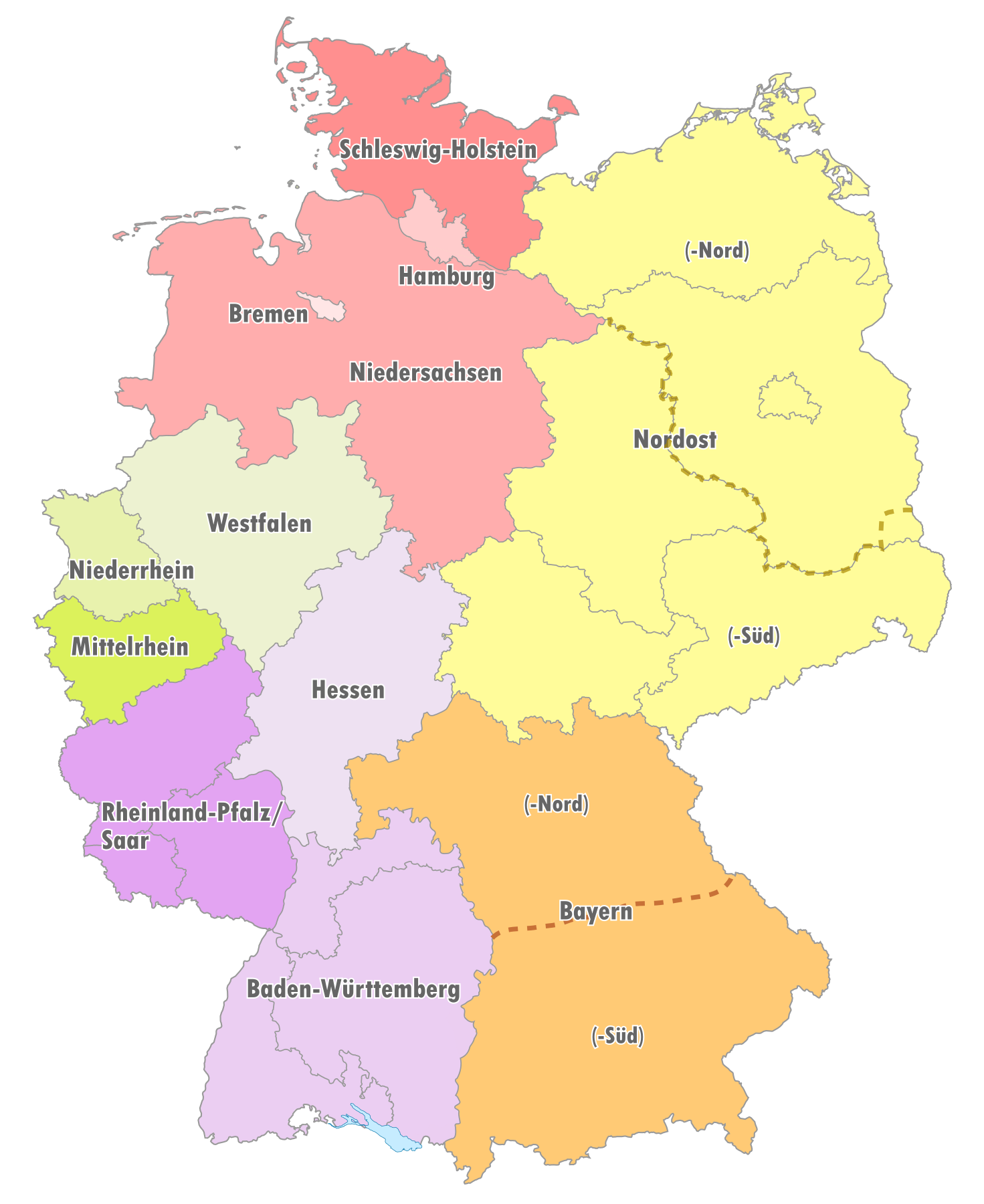
The fourteen Oberligas in Germany in 2016–17

In the 2016–17 season 241 clubs competed in the Oberligas.

Nine of the league champions earned direct promotion to the Regionalligas, SC Freiburg II, VfB Eichstätt, SSV Jeddeloh, FC Wegberg-Beeck, VSG Altglienicke, BSG Chemie Leipzig, KFC Uerdingen, TSV Schott Mainz and TuS Erndtebrück, while the Oberliga Westfalen runners-up, Westfalia Rhynern, Bayernliga Süd runners-up, FC Unterföhring and Hessenliga runners-up, Eintracht Stadtallendorf were also directly promoted. The latter two respectively replaced SV Pullach and SC Hessen Dreieich who declined promotion. In Northern Germany Bremer SV, Eintracht Northeim, Altona 93 and Eutin 08 competed for two more Regionalliga Nord places in a play-off, which Altona and Eutin won, while Röchling Völklingen, FSV Bissingen and Rot-Weiss Frankfurt did the same for the Regionalliga Südwest, with Völklingen earning promotion. Of the 49 clubs leaving the Oberliga 42 were relegated while 7 withdrew from the leagues.

== 2016–17 season ==
The 2016–17 league champions, promoted and relegated teams, the league strength (S), the top scorer and the number of goals they scored, as far as has been determined:

Oberliga	Champions	Promoted	Relegated	S	Top scorer	Goals
Oberliga Baden-Württemberg 2016–17 season	SC Freiburg II	SC Freiburg II	Stuttgarter Kickers II^{†} FSV Hollenbach Offenburger FV SpVgg Neckarelz	18	Patrick Lauble (Balingen)	21
Bayernliga Nord 2016–17 season	VfB Eichstätt	VfB Eichstätt	1. SC Feucht; Alemannia Haibach VfL Frohnlach	18	Fabian Eberle (Eichstätt)	26
Bayernliga Süd 2016–17 season	SV Pullach^{‡}	FC Unterföhring	Jahn Regensburg II TSV Bogen FC Gundelfingen	18	Orhan Akkurt (Heimstätten)	25
Bremen-Liga 2016–17 season	Bremer SV^{¶}	—	TSV Melchiorshausen SV Grohn	16	Jan-Niklas Kersten (Lehe)	34
Oberliga Hamburg 2016–17 season	TuS Dassendorf^{‡}	Altona 93	SV Halstenbek-Rellingen Klub Kosova Hamburg Buxtehuder SV	18	Marcel von Walsleben-Schied (Dassendorf)	28
Hessenliga 2016–17 season	SC Hessen Dreieich^{‡}	Eintracht Stadtallendorf	Sportfreunde Seligenstadt^{†} Rot-Weiß Darmstadt Viktoria Kelsterbach Viktoria Urberach	17	Salvatore Bari (Alzenau)	28
Mittelrheinliga 2016–17 season	FC Wegberg-Beeck	FC Wegberg-Beeck	FC Inde Hahn VfL Rheinbach Germania Windeck	16	Yuki Nishiya (Bergheim)	22
Niedersachsenliga 2016–17 season	SSV Jeddeloh	SSV Jeddeloh	VfL Osnabrück II^{†} FT Braunschweig Hannoverscher SC Blau-Weiß Bornreihe	16	Sascha Wald (Spelle)	20
NOFV-Oberliga Nord 2016–17 season	VSG Altglienicke	VSG Altglienicke	Germania Schöneiche^{†}: 1. FC Frankfurt	16	Murat Turhan (Rathenow)	36
NOFV-Oberliga Süd 2016–17 season	BSG Chemie Leipzig	BSG Chemie Leipzig	SSV Markranstädt	16	Artur Mergel (Jena II)	23
Oberliga Niederrhein 2016–17 season	KFC Uerdingen	KFC Uerdingen	TSV Meerbusch SC Kapellen-Erft SV Hönnepel-Niedermörmter FC Kray	18	Robin Hömig (Baumberg)	20
Oberliga Rheinland-Pfalz/Saar 2016–17 season	TSV Schott Mainz	TSV Schott Mainz Röchling Völklingen	FK Pirmasens II^{†} SC Hauenstein^{†} Arminia Ludwigshafen Borussia Neunkirchen SpVgg Burgbrohl	18	Janek Ripplingen (Mainz)	27
Schleswig-Holstein-Liga 2016–17 season	Eutin 08	Eutin 08	Flensburg 08^{†} TuS Hartenholm TSV Kropp Oldenburger SV TSV Altenholz Concordia Schönkirchen FC Kilia Kiel	18	Marco Pajonk (Strand)	30
Oberliga Westfalen 2016–17 season	TuS Erndtebrück	TuS Erndtebrück Westfalia Rhynern	SuS Neunkirchen SC Roland Beckum SuS Stadtlohn SpVgg Erkenschwick	18	Lennard Kleine (Rhynern)	21

- ^{‡} Denotes club declined promotion.
- ^{†} Denotes club withdrew from league.
- ^{¶} Denotes club failed to win promotion.
- ^{#} Denotes club was ineligible for promotion.

== Promotion play-offs ==
For three of the five Regionalligas promotion play-offs were held for qualified Oberliga teams. The other two Regionalligas, Nordost and West, did not hold play-off rounds, instead they operated with direct promotion only.

=== Regionalliga Bayern ===
The 15th and 16th placed Regionalliga teams, SpVgg Greuther Fürth II and SV Seligenporten, played the runners-up of the northern division and the third-placed team of the southern division. The winners of these games qualified for the 2016–17 Regionalliga, the losers played each other for one more spot in the Regionalliga after SpVgg Unterhaching was successful in winning promotion to the 3. Liga. The teams that qualified were runners-up Viktoria Aschaffenburg in the north and third-placed FC Pipinsried in the south as southern champions SV Pullach did not apply for a Regionalliga licence and runners-up FC Unterföhring were promoted.

Round one

Team 1	Agg.	Team 2	1st leg	2nd leg
Viktoria Aschaffenburg	1–2	SV Seligenporten	0–2	1–0
FC Pipinsried	4–3	SpVgg Greuther Fürth II	1–1	3–2

Round two

Team 1	Agg.	Team 2	1st leg	2nd leg
Viktoria Aschaffenburg	4–5	SpVgg Greuther Fürth II	3–4	1–1

=== Regionalliga Nord ===
Promotion play-offs were to be held at the end of the season to the Regionalliga Nord. The runners-up of the Niedersachsenliga and the champions or, in Hamburg's case, the best-placed team with a licence, of the Bremen-Liga, Oberliga Hamburg and Schleswig-Holstein-Liga played each other for two more spots in the Regionalliga. In the promotion round each team met the other just once with the two highest-placed teams in the final table promoted, however the final two matches were deemed obsolete and played as friendly matches because the two promoted teams had already been determined.

Pos	Team	Pld	W	D	L	GF	GA	GD	Pts	Promotion	EUT	ALT	NOR	BSV
1	Eutin 08 (P)	2	2	0	0	2	0	+2	6	Promotion to Regionalliga	—	—	0–1	0–2
2	Altona 93 (P)	2	2	0	0	3	0	+3	6	Promotion to Regionalliga	0–0	—	—	—
3	Eintracht Northeim	2	0	0	2	0	2	−2	0		—	0–1	—	0–3
4	Bremer SV	2	0	0	2	0	3	−3	0		—	0–1	—	—

Source: Weltfussball.de
Rules for classification: 1) Points; 2) Head-to-head; 3) Decider;
(P) Promoted

=== Regionalliga Südwest ===
The runners-up of the Hessenliga, Oberliga Baden-Württemberg and Oberliga Rheinland-Pfalz/Saar competed for one more spot in the Regionalliga Südwest, with each team playing the other just once.

Pos	Team	Pld	W	D	L	GF	GA	GD	Pts	Promotion	VÖL	BIS	RWF
1	Röchling Völklingen (P)	2	1	1	0	2	1	+1	4	Promotion to Regionalliga	—	1–0	—
2	FSV Bissingen	2	1	0	1	4	1	+3	3		—	—	4–0
3	Rot-Weiss Frankfurt	2	0	1	1	1	5	−4	1		1–1	—	—

Source: Weltfussball.de
Rules for classification: 1) Points; 2) Head-to-head; 3) Decider;
(P) Promoted
