= 2014–15 Schleswig-Holstein-Liga =

- Season: 2014–15
- Champions: TSV Schilksee
- Promoted: TSV Schilksee
- Relegated: NTSV Strand 08 FC Dornbreite Lübeck TSV Bordesholm FC Angeln 02
- Matches: 306
- Top goalscorer: Ian-Prescott Claus (34 goals)
- Total attendance: 58,268
- Average attendance: 190

The 2014–15 season of the Schleswig-Holstein-Liga, the highest association football league in the German state of Schleswig-Holstein, was the seventh season of the league at tier five (V) of the German football league system.

== League table ==
The 2014–15 season six new clubs in the league, SV Henstedt-Ulzburg, Eutin 08, Oldenburger SV, TSV Bordesholm and FC Angeln 02, all promoted from the Verbandsligas while SV Eichede was relegated from the Regionalliga Nord.

Pos	Team	Pld	W	D	L	GF	GA	GD	Pts	Qualification or relegation
1	TSV Schilksee (C, P)	34	22	8	4	94	33	+61	74	Qualification to promotion playoffs
2	Holstein Kiel II (Note: Reserve teams of 3. Liga clubs are ineligible for Regionalliga promotion.)	34	22	6	6	90	38	+52	72	
3	SV Eichede	34	22	5	7	102	48	+54	71	
4	Eutin 08	34	19	7	8	70	45	+25	64	
5	SV Todesfelde	34	18	5	11	88	55	+33	59	
6	TSV Kropp	34	17	8	9	81	54	+27	59	
7	Preetzer TSV	34	16	5	13	65	60	+5	53	
8	TSV Altenholz	34	15	6	13	68	71	−3	51	
9	Flensburg 08	34	14	5	15	90	76	+14	47	
10	SV Henstedt-Ulzburg	34	14	4	16	52	75	−23	46	
11	TuS Hartenholm	34	12	9	13	62	75	−13	45	
12	Union Neumünster	34	11	8	15	60	69	−9	41	
13	TuRa Meldorf	34	10	9	15	55	66	−11	39	
14	Heider SV	34	9	10	15	42	49	−7	37	
15	NTSV Strand 08 (R)	34	11	3	20	45	84	−39	36	Relegation to Verbandsligas
16	FC Dornbreite Lübeck (R)	34	10	3	21	48	93	−45	33	Relegation to Verbandsligas
17	TSV Bordesholm (R)	34	6	4	24	46	96	−50	22	Relegation to Verbandsligas
18	FC Angeln 02 (R)	34	4	3	27	34	105	−71	15	Relegation to Verbandsligas

Source: kicker.de, soccerway.com
Rules for classification: 1) Points; 2) Goal difference; 3) Goals scored; 4) head-to-head results; 5) goals scored away from home against opponent; 6) goals scored away from home; 7) drawing of lots
(C) Champions; (P) Promoted; (R) Relegated

=== Top goalscorers ===
The top goal scorers for the season:

Rank	Player	Club	Goals
1	(Germany) Ian-Prescott Claus	TuRa Meldorf SV Eichede	34
2	(Germany) Sebastian Kiesbye	Flensburg 08	30
3	(Germany) Finn Langkowski	TSV Kropp	25

== Promotion round ==
The champions of the Bremen-Liga, Oberliga Hamburg and the Schleswig-Holstein-Liga as well as the runners-up from the Niedersachsenliga entered a play-off for two more spots in the Regionalliga Nord. Eight clubs from these four leagues applied for a Regionalliga licence. As the only club from Hamburg to apply for a licence, SC Victoria Hamburg, later declined participation only three clubs take part in the promotion round, Bremer SV, TSV Schilksee and VfV 06 Hildesheim, with the latter two promoted:

31 May 2015	Bremer SV	2–1	VfV 06 Hildesheim	Panzenberg Stadium, Bremen
14:00	Kurkiewicz 17' Abendroth 80' (pen.)	Report	Rockahr 48'	Attendance: 912; Referee: Franz Bokop

3 June 2015	TSV Schilksee	2–1	Bremer SV	Jürgen-Lüthje-Arena, Kiel
19:30	Schubert 4' Nath 41'	Report	Koweschnikow 89'	Attendance: 832; Referee: Robert Schröder

6 June 2015	VfV 06 Hildesheim	3–2	TSV Schilksee	Friedrich-Ebert-Stadion, Hildesheim
15:00	Rockahr 20' Fahmy 31' Schlichting 87'	Report	Petrick 59' Nath 82'	Attendance: 2,598; Referee: Florian Heft
