= Derek Cornelius =

Canadian soccer player (born 1997)

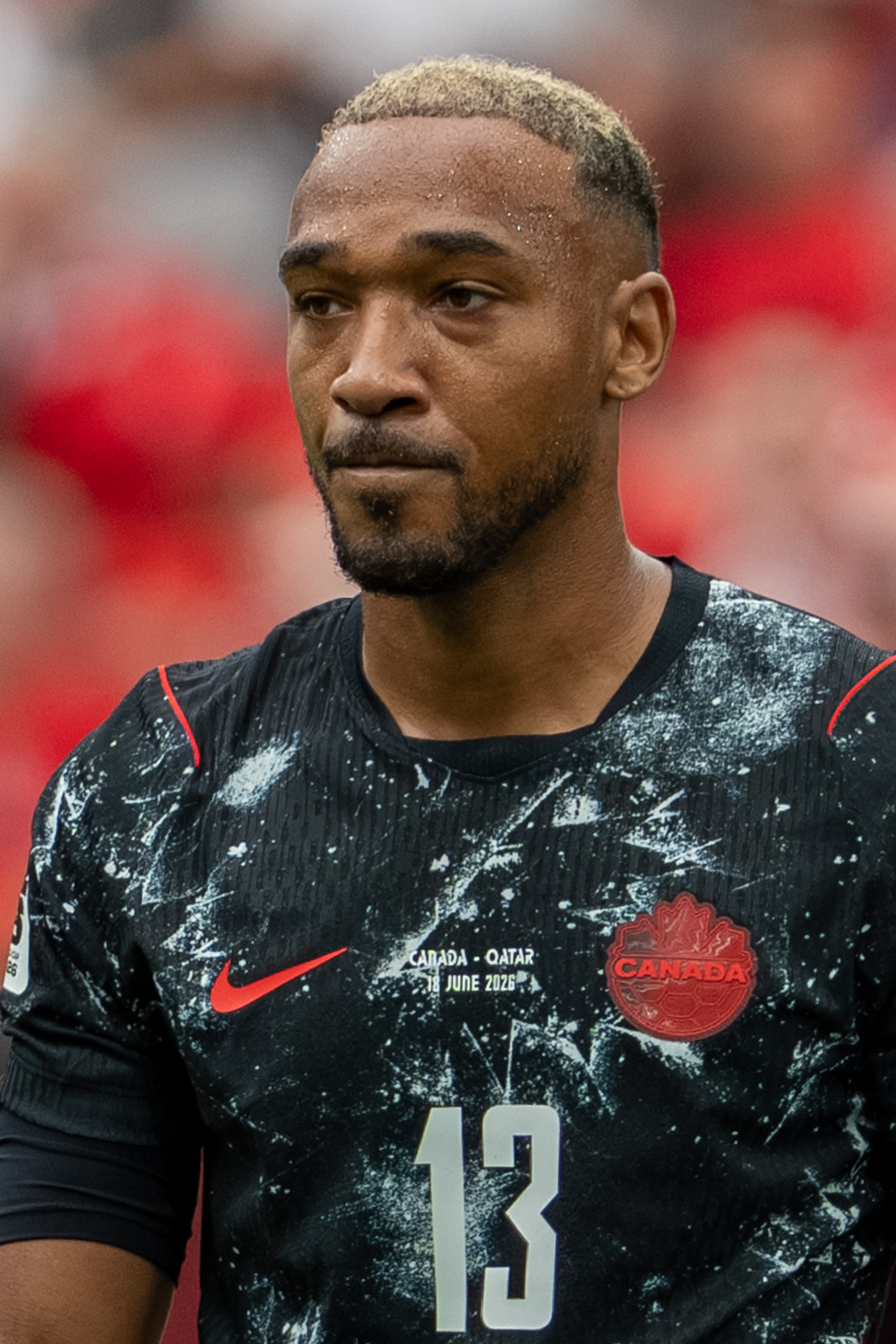
- Cornelius with Canada in 2026

Personal information
- Full name: Derek Austin Cornelius
- Date of birth: 25 November 1997 (age 28)
- Place of birth: Ajax, Ontario, Canada
- Height: 1.87 m (6 ft 2 in)
- Position: Centre-back

Team information
- Current team: Marseille
- Number: 13

Youth career
- Ajax SC
- 2009–2011: Spartacus SC
- 2011–2013: Unionville Milliken SC
- 2014–2016: VfB Lübeck

Senior career*
Years	Team	Apps	(Gls)
2016	VfB Lübeck	1	(0)
2016	VfR Neumünster	17	(2)
2017–2018	Javor Ivanjica	28	(0)
2019–2022	Vancouver Whitecaps FC	35	(1)
2021–2022	→ Panetolikos (loan)	42	(2)
2023–2024	Malmö FF	37	(5)
2024–	Marseille	26	(0)
2025–2026	→ Rangers (loan)	7	(1)

International career^{‡}
2018–2021	Canada U23	7	(1)
2018–	Canada	48	(1)
- * Club domestic league appearances and goals as of 11 September 2026 ‡ National team caps and goals as of 28 June 2026

Derek Austin Cornelius (born 25 November 1997) is a Canadian professional soccer player who plays as a centre-back for Ligue 1 club Marseille and the Canada national team.

== Early life ==
Cornelius was born in Ajax, Ontario, to a Barbadian father and a Jamaican mother. Cornelius started playing when he was selected as a younger player for the 1996 House League All-Star team. He was then selected by the Ajax Thunder under-8 team at six years old. In the season after that, he was the Unionville Milliken Challenge Cup Champions Most Valuable Player. At the U11 level, he won the C.O.V.I. Championship and was proclaimed the Most Valuable Player.

In 2012, he played in the Oviedo Cup with PFC CSKA Moscow in Spain, then he played in the Milk Cup by CSKA Moscow in Northern Ireland where he led the team scoring four goals in the tournament. He ended that year by being invited to the CSKA Moscow Reserve Camp and by playing in the U21 Provincial and Men's Regional leagues, scoring 22 goals in 30 games.

In 2013, he was selected for the Canada national under-17 team for camp in Florida and Costa Rica, and was later selected for the CONCACAF World Cup U17 Qualifier pre-camp in Florida. He was also selected for the Canada national under-16 Team for the Torneo delle Nazioni tournament in Italy. That same year he was invited to Hungary for trials with Nyíregyháza Spartacus FC and Győri ETO FC in March.

== Club career ==
=== Early career ===
In January 2014, Cornelius moved to Germany. He began training with VfB Lübeck U19 team. He spent two seasons with the main team, but was unable to play due to FIFA rules for underaged players. He became eligible to play effective on 1 January 2016. With VfB Lübeck he won the Schleswig-Holstein Cup two consecutive seasons and made an appearance in the 2015–16 Regionalliga Nord.

In the summer of 2016, he moved to VfR Neumünster where he was converted from forward to a defender. He was playing with them the first half of the season, making 17 appearances and scoring two goals.

=== Javor Ivanjica ===
During the winter break of the 2016–17 season, Cornelius was signed by Serbian SuperLiga side FK Javor Ivanjica after successful trials arranged by Petar Raković and Miloš Kocić. He made his league debut on 29 April 2017, in an away game against FK Radnički Niš. Javor head coach Srđan Vasiljević converted Cornelius from a forward into a centre-back.

=== Vancouver Whitecaps FC ===
On 18 January 2019, Cornelius returned to his native Canada and signed with MLS side Vancouver Whitecaps FC. He made his debut for the Whitecaps on 2 March in their 2019 MLS season opener against Minnesota United. Cornelius scored his first goal for the club on 18 May against Sporting Kansas City.

In July 2021 the Whitecaps announced Cornelius had been loaned to Panetolikos of the Super League Greece until December 2022.

=== Malmö FF ===
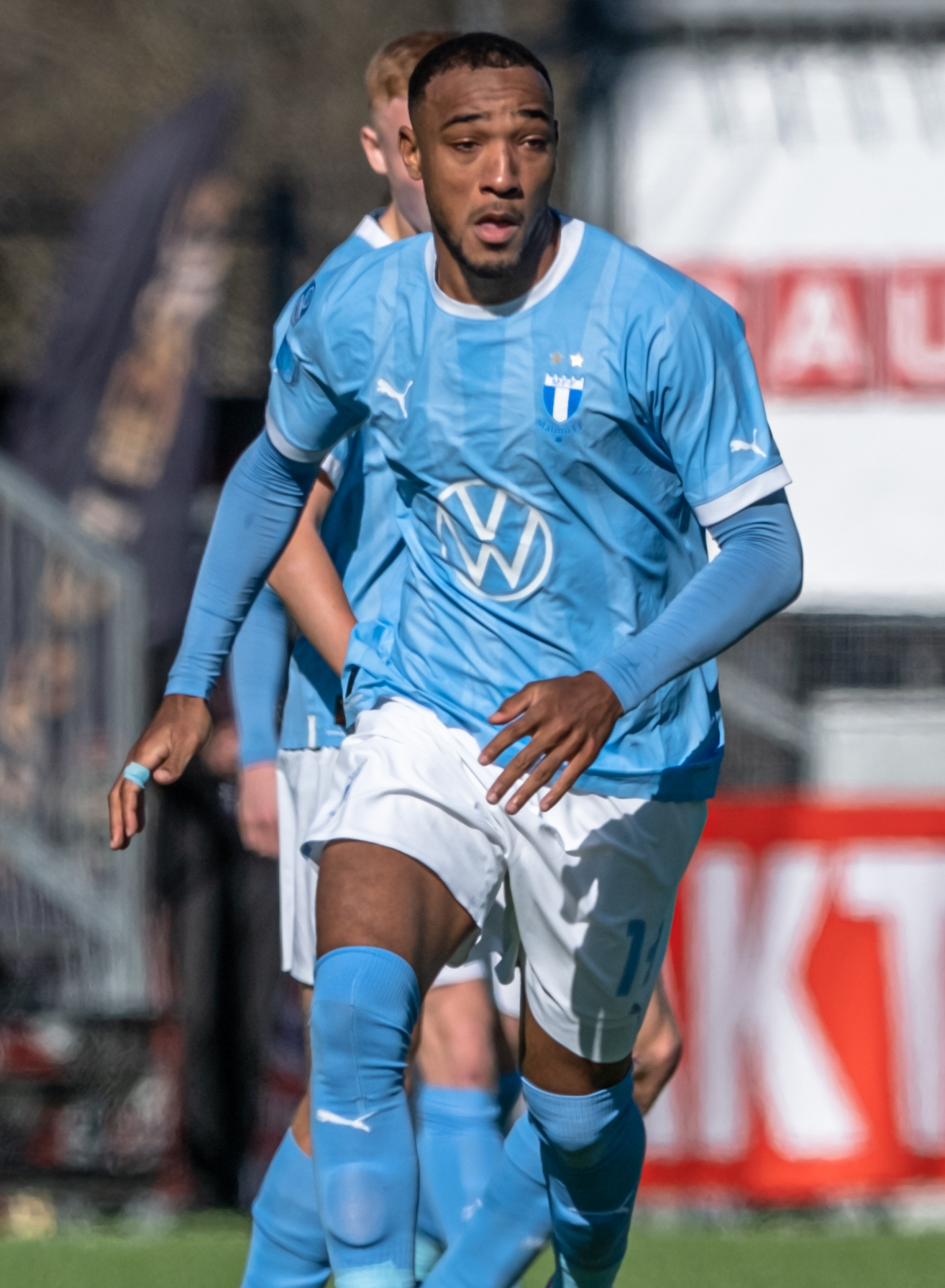
Cornelius playing for Malmö FF in 2023

In December 2022 Vancouver announced Cornelius had been transferred to Allsvenskan side Malmö FF. He signed a contract through 2026 with the Scandinavian club. Cornelius made his competitive debut for his new club against Skövde AIK in the Svenska Cupen on 19 February 2023. He scored his first goal for Malmö on 5 March against Degerfors IF, winning the match. His first season with Malmö was a success, with the club winning the 2023 Allsvenskan.

=== Marseille ===
In August 2024, Cornelius was transferred to Ligue 1 club OM on a four-year deal. He made his debut for his new club on 17 August, starting their first match of the season against Brest. In September 2025, Cornelius joined Scottish Premiership side Rangers on loan, with an option to make the move permanent.

== International career ==
=== Youth ===
Cornelius was part of a Canadian U17 camp in February 2013. He was called up to a U23 camp in January 2018. In May 2018, Cornelius was named to Canada's under-21 squad for the 2018 Toulon Tournament and would earn rave reviews for his performance at the tournament. At the end of 2018, he was named the Canada Soccer Youth International Player of the Year.

In March 2021 Cornelius was named to the Canadian U-23 roster for the 2020 CONCACAF Men's Olympic Qualifying Championship. He served as captain throughout the tournament, and scored a goal against Honduras in Canada's final group stage match.

=== Senior ===
In March 2018, Cornelius received his first call up to the Canadian senior side for a friendly against New Zealand to be played on 24 March. He would make his debut for Canada on 9 September 2018, starting and playing the entire match in an 8–0 victory over the U.S. Virgin Islands. Cornelius was named to the 23-man squad for the 2019 CONCACAF Gold Cup on 30 May 2019.

In November 2022, Cornelius was named to Canada's squad for the 2022 FIFA World Cup. In June 2023 Cornelius was named to the final 23-man squad for the 2023 CONCACAF Nations League Finals, but after suffering an injury with his club side Malmö FF, he was withdrawn from the squad and replaced by Moïse Bombito.

In June 2024, Cornelius was named to Canada's squad for the 2024 Copa América.

On 28 May 2026, Cornelius was selected for Canada's squad for the 2026 FIFA World Cup.

== Career statistics ==
=== Club ===
As of match played 17 September 2026

Appearances and goals by club, season and competition
Club	Season	League			National cup (Note: Includes Serbian Cup, U.S. Open Cup, Greek Cup, Swedish Cup, Coupe de France)		League cup (Note: Includes Scottish League Cup)		Other		Total	
Club	Season	Division	Apps	Goals	Apps	Goals	Apps	Goals	Apps	Goals	Apps	Goals
VfB Lübeck	2015–16	Regionalliga Nord	1	0	—		—		—		1	0
VfR Neumünster	2016–17	Oberliga Schleswig-Holstein	17	2	—		—		—		17	2
Javor Ivanjica	2016–17	Serbian SuperLiga	3	0	—		—		—		3	0
Javor Ivanjica	2017–18	Serbian SuperLiga	22	0	3	0	—		—		25	0
Javor Ivanjica	2018–19	Serbian First League	3	0	—		—		—		3	0
Javor Ivanjica	Total		28	0	3	0	—		—		31	0
Vancouver Whitecaps	2019	Major League Soccer	17	1	1	0	—		—		18	1
Vancouver Whitecaps	2020	Major League Soccer	13	0	—		—		1 (Note: Appearance in MLS is Back Tournament knockout stage)	0	14	0
Vancouver Whitecaps	2021	Major League Soccer	5	0	—		—		—		5	0
Vancouver Whitecaps	Total		35	1	1	0	—		1	0	37	1
Panetolikos (loan)	2021–22	Super League Greece	29	2	4	0	—		—		33	2
Panetolikos (loan)	2022–23	Super League Greece	13	0	1	0	—		—		14	0
Panetolikos (loan)	Total		42	2	5	0	—		—		45	2
Malmö FF	2023	Allsvenskan	25	3	5	1	—		—		30	4
Malmö FF	2024	Allsvenskan	12	2	7	0	—		—		19	2
Malmö FF	Total		37	5	12	1	—		—		49	6
Marseille	2024–25	Ligue 1	21	0	2	0	—		—		23	0
Marseille	2025–26	Ligue 1	2	0	—		—		—		2	0
Marseille	2026–27	Ligue 1	3	0	0	0	—		1 (Note: Appearances in UEFA Europa League)	0	4	0
Marseille	Total		26	0	2	0	—		1	0	29	0
Rangers (loan)	2025–26	Scottish Premiership	7	1	0	0	2	0	3	0	12	1
Career total			191	11	23	0	2	0	5	0	221	12

=== International ===
As of match played 28 June 2026

Appearances and goals by national team and year
National team	Year	Apps	Goals
Canada	2018	4	0
Canada	2019	8	0
Canada	2020	1	0
Canada	2021	1	0
Canada	2022	0	0
Canada	2023	4	0
Canada	2024	11	0
Canada	2025	11	1
Canada	2026	8	0
Total		48	1

Scores and results list Canada's goal tally first, score column indicates score after each Cornelius goal.

List of international goals scored by Derek Cornelius
No.	Date	Venue	Cap	Opponent	Score	Result	Competition
1	9 September 2025	Swansea.com Stadium, Swansea, Wales	37	Wales	1–0	1–0	Friendly

== Honours ==
VfB Lübeck

- Schleswig-Holstein Cup: 2015, 2016

Malmö FF

- Allsvenskan: 2023, 2024
- Svenska Cupen: 2023–24

Individual

- CONCACAF Men's Olympic Qualifying Best XI: 2020
- Canadian Men's Youth International Player of the Year: 2018
