= Verbandsliga Schleswig-Holstein-Ost =

- Founded: 2008
- Country: Germany
- State: Schleswig-Holstein
- Number of clubs: 12
- Level on pyramid: Level 7
- Promotion to: Landesliga Schleswig-Holstein
- Relegation to: Kreisliga
- Current champions: FC Kilia Kiel (2019–20)

The Verbandsliga Schleswig-Holstein-Ost is the seventh tier of the German football league system and the third-highest league in the German state of Schleswig-Holstein, together with five other leagues at this level in the state. The league was formed at the end of the 2007–08 season, to replace the previously existing Bezirksoberligas at this level.

== Overview ==
With the changes to the German football league system in 2008 that went alongside the introduction of the 3. Liga, four new Verbandsligas were formed in Schleswig-Holstein as the sixth tier of the league system, these being:

- Verbandsliga Schleswig-Holstein-Ost (as Nord-Ost)
- Verbandsliga Schleswig-Holstein-Nord (as Nord-West)
- Verbandsliga Schleswig-Holstein-Süd (as Süd-Ost)
- Verbandsliga Schleswig-Holstein-West (as Süd-West)

Previous to that, from 1978 to 2008, a single-division Verbandsliga Schleswig-Holstein had existed which was now renamed Oberliga Schleswig-Holstein and received the status of an Oberliga.

These four new Verbandsligas replaced the previously existing four Bezirksoberligas (BOL), who were, until then, divided into northern, southern, eastern and western divisions. The Bezirksoberligas themselves had been formed in 1999. Other changes in the league system were the abolishment of the four Bezirksoberligas and the five Bezirksligas below them. Additionally, the regional alignment of the four new Verbandsligas differed from the Bezirksoberligas they replaced, making the change from one to the other more than just a renaming of leagues.

The new Verbandsliga Schleswig-Holstein-Ost was formed from nine clubs from the former Bezirksoberliga Schleswig-Holstein-Ost (VI), six clubs from the Bezirksliga Schleswig-Holstein-Ost (VII) and the TSV Groß Vollstedt from the Kreisliga Rendsburg-Eckernförde (VIII).

The league champions of each of the six Verbandsligas will earn promotion to the Landesliga Schleswig-Holstein. Below the six Verbandsligas, eleven regional Kreisligas are placed. The bottom teams in the Verbandsligas will be relegated to the Kreisligas while the champions of those will earn promotion to the Verbandsligas. The Verbandsliga Ost covers the following four Kreise:

- Rendsburg-Eckernförde
- Ostholstein
- Plön
- Kiel

From the 2017–18 season onwards, the Verbandsligas were contracted to 16 teams each and downgraded to seventh tier with the introduction of the new Landesliga Schleswig-Holstein (VI). For the 2020–21 season, however, relegation was suspended after the previous one and the division temporarily contracted to 12 teams, losing three of four to the recreated Nord-Ost group.

== League champions ==
Season	Champions
2008–09	TSV Klausdorf
2009–10	TSV Bordesholm
2010–11	Preetzer TSV
2011–12	TSV Altenholz
2012–13	TSV Schilksee
2013–14	TSV Bordesholm
2014–15	FC Kilia Kiel
2015–16	TSG Concordia Schönkirchen
2016–17	Inter Türkspor Kiel
2017–18	SpVg Eidertal Molfsee
2018–19	TSV Kronshagen
2019–20	FC Kilia Kiel

- In 2019 SVE Comet Kiel was also promoted as runner-up.
- In 2020 the season was abandoned due to the coronavirus pandemic in Germany and table placings were determined by points per game averages. TSV Plön was also promoted as runner-up.

== Founding members ==
The league was formed from 16 clubs, which played in the following leagues in 2007-08:

- From the Bezirksoberliga Schleswig-Holstein-Ost:
  - Preetzer TSV, 2nd
  - TSV Klausdorf, 4th
  - Rendsburger TSV, 5th
  - TSV Bordesholm, 6th
  - Suchsdorfer SV, 9th
  - Osterrönfelder TSV, 10th
  - SV Friedrichsort, 11th
  - Büdelsdorfer TSV, 13th
  - SpVg Eidertal Molfsee, 14th
- From the Bezirksliga Schleswig-Holstein-Ost:
  - Inter Türkspor Kiel, 1st
  - TuS Holtenau, 2nd
  - TSV Lütjenburg, 3rd
  - TSV Kronshagen, 4th
  - Gettorfer SC, 5th
  - TuS Rotenhof, 6th
- From the 1. Kreisliga Rendsburg-Eckernförde:
  - TSV Groß Vollstedt, 1st
