= Bezirksliga =

- Country: Germany
- Level on pyramid: Level 7, 8 and 9
- Promotion to: Verbandsliga

The Bezirksliga (English: County League) is commonly a medium set of amateur divisions set at steps 7, 8 or 9 in the German football league system.

== Structure ==
Depending on the structural organisation within each of the 21 state football associations of the German Football Association, the Bezirksliga either falls under the state association's jurisdiction or one of its subsidiary county football associations that organise their divisions mostly following the borders of the corresponding government districts. In the league pyramid, the Bezirksliga always ranks below the superior state association's divisions, typically being the Verbandsliga and the Landesliga but ahead of the district associations' Kreisliga.

The Bezirksliga does not exist within all associations, and where existing it is set in varying numbers and form. The former Bezirksoberliga is currently not existing in the league system, as the Hesse state association renamed the division to Gruppenliga and as the state associations of Lower Saxony and Bavaria disbanded the league in recent years.

== Overview by state association ==
| State association | Step 7 | Step 8 | Step 9 |
|---|---|---|---|
| Baden | | | |
| Bavaria | Bezirksliga | | |
| Berlin | | Bezirksliga | |
| Brandenburg | | | |
| Bremen | Bezirksliga | | |
| Hamburg | Bezirksliga | | |
| Hesse | Gruppenliga | | |
| Lower Rhine | Bezirksliga | | |
| Lower Saxony | Bezirksliga | | |
| Mecklenburg-Western Pomerania | | | |
| Middle Rhine | Bezirksliga | | |
| Rhineland | Bezirksliga | | |
| Saarland | | | Bezirksliga |
| Saxony | | | |
| Saxony-Anhalt | | | |
| Schleswig-Holstein | | | |
| South Baden | | Bezirksliga | |
| Southwest | | Bezirksliga | |
| Thuringia | | | |
| Westphalia | | Bezirksliga | |
| Württemberg | | Bezirksliga | |
