= Verbandsliga Schleswig-Holstein-West =

- Founded: 2008
- Country: Germany
- State: Schleswig-Holstein
- Number of clubs: 12
- Level on pyramid: Level 7
- Promotion to: Landesliga Schleswig-Holstein
- Relegation to: Kreisliga
- Current champions: SV Henstedt-Ulzburg (2019–20)

The Verbandsliga Schleswig-Holstein-West is the seventh tier of the German football league system and the third-highest league in the German state of Schleswig-Holstein, together with five other leagues at this level in the state. The league was formed at the end of the 2007-08 season to replace the previously existing Bezirksoberligas at this level.

== Overview ==
With the changes to the German football league system in 2008 that went alongside the introduction of the 3. Liga, four new Verbandsligas were formed in Schleswig-Holstein as the sixth tier of the league system, these being:

- Verbandsliga Schleswig-Holstein-West (as Süd-West)
- Verbandsliga Schleswig-Holstein-Süd (as Süd-Ost)
- Verbandsliga Schleswig-Holstein-Nord (as Nord-West)
- Verbandsliga Schleswig-Holstein-Ost (as Nord-Ost)

Previous to that, from 1978 to 2008, a single-division Verbandsliga Schleswig-Holstein existed which was now renamed Oberliga Schleswig-Holstein and received the status of an Oberliga.

These four new Verbandsligas replaced the previously existing four Bezirksoberligas (BOL), who were, until then, divided into a northern, southern, eastern and western division. The Bezirksoberligas themselves were formed in 1999. Other changes in the league system were the abolishment of the four Bezirksoberligas and the five Bezirksligas below them. Additionally, the regional alignment of the four new Verbandsligas differed from the Bezirksoberligas they replaced, making the change from one to the other more than just a renaming of leagues.

The new Verbandsliga Schleswig-Holstein-West was formed from one club of the Verbandsliga Schleswig-Holstein (V), two clubs from the former Bezirksoberliga Schleswig-Holstein-Süd (VI), four clubs from the Bezirksoberliga Schleswig-Holstein-West and the Bezirksoberliga Schleswig-Holstein-Ost each, one from the Bezirksliga Schleswig-Holstein-Ost (VII) and four clubs from the Bezirksliga Schleswig-Holstein-Süd (VII), three from the northern division and one from the southern division.

The league champions of each of the six Verbandsligas will earn promotion to the Landesliga Schleswig-Holstein. Below the six Verbandsligas, eleven regional Kreisligas are placed. The bottom teams in the Verbandsligas will be relegated to the Kreisligas while the champions of those will earn promotion to the Verbandsligas. The Verbandsliga West covers the following four Kreise:

- Neumünster
- Rendsburg-Eckernförde
- Segeberg
- Steinburg

From the 2017-18 season onwards, the Verbandsligas were contracted to 16 teams each and downgraded to seventh tier with the introduction of the new Landesliga Schleswig-Holstein (VI). For the 2020–21 season, however, relegation was suspended after the previous one and the league temporarily contracted to 12 teams, losing four from 2019–20 to the West division and two to the new Nord-Ost.

== League champions ==
Season	Champions
2008–09	PSV Neumünster
2009–10	SV Todesfelde
2010–11	SG Türk Spor/Itzehoer SV
2011–12	TuS Hartenholm
2012–13	Union Neumünster
2013–14	SG Reher-Puls
2014–15	SG Reher-Puls
2015–16	TSV Lägerdorf
2016–17	TSV Wankendorf
2017–18	TuS Jevenstedt
2018–19	SSC Phoenix Kisdorf
2019–20	SV Henstedt-Ulzburg

- In 2011 SV Schackendorf was promoted instead of SG Türk Spor/Itzehoer SV. Türk Spor Itzehoe and Itzehoer SV merged in April that year to form FC Itzehoe.
- In 2014 runner-up SV Henstedt-Ulzburg was promoted instead of SG Reher-Puls.
- In 2018 and 2019 runners-up MTSV Hohenwestedt and SV Tungendorf were also promoted respectively.
- In 2020 the season was abandoned due to the coronavirus pandemic in Germany and table placings were determined by points per game averages. SG Geest 05 was also promoted as runner-up.

== Founding members ==
The league was formed from 16 clubs, which had played in the following leagues in 2007-08:

- From the Verbandsliga Schleswig-Holstein:
  - SV Todesfelde, 13th
- From the Bezirksoberliga Schleswig-Holstein-Süd:
  - Kaltenkirchener TS, 6th
  - SV Westerrade, 10th
- From the Bezirksoberliga Schleswig-Holstein-West:
  - SV Alemannia Wilster, 5th
  - TSV Laegerdorf, 8th
  - MTSV Hohenwestedt, 9th
  - ETSV Fortuna Glückstadt, 11th
- From the Bezirksoberliga Schleswig-Holstein-Ost:
  - TuS Nortorf, 3rd
  - PSV Neumünster, 7th
  - TSV Wankendorf, 8th
  - TSV Gadeland, 12th
- From the Bezirksliga Schleswig-Holstein-Ost:
  - SG Reher-Puls, 1st
- From the Bezirksliga Schleswig-Holstein-Süd (Süd):
  - SV Henstedt-Rhen II, 6th
- From the Bezirksliga Schleswig-Holstein-Süd (Nord):
  - SV Schackendorf, 3rd
  - SV Wahlstedt, 4th
  - SG Bornhöved-Trappenkamp, 6th
