= Itzehoer SV =

- Full name: Itzehoer Sportverein von 1909 e.V.
- Nickname: ISV
- Founded: 3 October 1909
- Dissolved: 1 June 2018
- Ground: Driver & Bengsch-Stadion
- Capacity: 9,000
Home colours	Away colours

Itzehoer SV was a German association football club from the town of Itzehoe, Schleswig-Holstein. The club's greatest success was promotion to the tier-one Oberliga Nord, where it spent a single season in 1950–51. It also played in the then-second division Regionalliga Nord from 1965 to 1974.

Itzehoe also made five appearances in the first round of the German Cup, the DFB-Pokal, advancing to the second round just once, in 1977–78. In later times the club suffered from financial difficulties, merging with another local club and changing its name to Itzehoer FC but reverting to the old name in early 2015 until its folding in 2018.

== History ==
Itzehoer SV was established on 3 October 1909 as FC Preußen 1909 Itzehoe and renamed to SV Preußen 1909 Itzehoe in 1919. In 1945 Preußen, VfL Eintracht Itzehoe and SC Askania Itzehoe 1911 merged to form Itzehoer SV. The club won the Schleswig-Holstein championship in 1920 but remained otherwise undistinguished.

In post-Second World War football Itzehoer SV played in the Landesliga Schleswig-Holstein, winning three consecutive league championships from 1947 to 1950, the latter earning the club promotion to the Oberliga. The club played, for a single season in 1950–51, in the tier-one Oberliga Nord but was immediately relegated after finishing seventeenth.

From 1951 to 1965 the club played in the Amateurliga Schleswig-Holstein and, with the exception of the period from 1960 to 1962, was always a top side in the league, winning championships in 1954 and 1965.

Itzehoe's most successful era came from 1965 to 1974 when it played in the tier-two Regionalliga Nord, the second tier of the German league system, below the Bundesliga. In all nine seasons at this level the club never finished better than twelfth place, but despite this avoided relegation until the league was disbanded at the end of the 1973–74 season, when it missed out on qualifying for the new 2. Bundesliga. In this era it also made its first DFB-Pokal appearance, losing 7–1 to SSV Reutlingen in the first round in 1967–68.

The club was grouped in the new Oberliga Nord from 1974 onwards, now a tier-three league. Itzehoe played there for the next seven seasons, until another relegation in 1981, with an eighth place in its first season as its best result.

Itzehoer SV made three consecutive DFB-Pokal appearances in 1975–76, 1977–77 and 1977–78, losing to SpVgg Lindau and 1. FC Köln in the first round on the first two occasions while advancing to the second in 1977–78. After a victory over Borussia Brand in the first round it lost to SpVgg Bayreuth in the second. The club, for a last time, appeared in the 1985–86 DFB-Pokal but lost 2–0 at fellow amateur side SpVgg Plattling.

After relegation from the Oberliga Itzehoe experienced a difficult era from 1981 to 1984, battling against further relegation but recovered and, in 1984–85 and 1985–86, won the league twice more but failed to earn promotion. In 1989 the club suffered relegation from what was now the Verbandsliga Schleswig-Holstein, to the Bezirksoberliga below, but made an immediate return. A sixth place in 1993–94 was enough to qualify for the expanded Oberliga.

In 1994 Itzehoer SV became a founding member of the new Oberliga Hamburg/Schleswig-Holstein, the new fourth tier of league football in the region. It played there for six seasons, finishing fifth in 1998–99 as its best result, but suffering relegation the season after. Itzehoe played in the Verbandsliga again from 2000 to 2006, winning a league title in 2005 but being relegated the season after. It quickly returned once more and stayed in the league after it received Oberliga status in 2008.

It joint with local club Türk Spor Itzehoe to form an on-the-field union in 2010–11 and the football departments of the two merged in November 2010 to form FC Itzehoe.

FC Itzehoe experienced financial difficulties after the withdrawal of the main sponsor in May 2014 and almost folded. The team had to be withdrawn from the Verbandsliga to the Kreisliga below and the club's budged was greatly reduced. In March 2015 it voted to return to its old name, Itzehoer SV. In May 2017 Itzehoe returned to the now tier-seven Verbandsliga. By December it became known that the club was insolvent again and in January 2018, it filed a bankruptcy petition. On 1 June, the insolvency proceedings were opened and the club was thus dissolved. A successor club Itzehoer SV 2.0 was founded.

== Honours ==
The club's honours:

- Schleswig-Holstein-Liga (II/III/IV/V)
  - Champions: 1948, 1949, 1950, 1954, 1965, 1985, 1986, 2005
  - Runners-up: 1952, 1958
- Schleswig-Holstein Cup (Tiers III-V)
  - Winners: 1955, 1964, 1975, 1985

== Last seasons ==
The later season-by-season performance of the club:

Season	Division	Tier	Position
2002–03	Verbandsliga Schleswig-Holstein	V	6th
2003–04	Verbandsliga Schleswig-Holstein	V	3rd
2004–05	Verbandsliga Schleswig-Holstein	V	1st
2005–06	Verbandsliga Schleswig-Holstein	V	14th ↓
2006–07	Bezirksoberliga West	VI	1st ↑
2007–08	Verbandsliga Schleswig-Holstein	V	12th
2008–09	Schleswig-Holstein-Liga	V	11th
2009–10	Schleswig-Holstein-Liga	V	18th ↓
2010–11	Verbandsliga Süd-West	VI	1st^{†}
2011–12	Verbandsliga Süd-West	VI	3rd^{‡}
2012–13	Verbandsliga Süd-West	VI	2nd^{‡}
2013–14	Verbandsliga Süd-West	VI	6th (withdrawn)^{‡}
2014–15	Kreisliga West	VII	8th
2015–16	Kreisliga West	VII	12th
2016–17	Kreisliga West	VII	4th ↑
2017–18	Verbandsliga West	VII	12th

- With the introduction of the Regionalligas in 1994 and the 3. Liga in 2008 as the new third tier, below the 2. Bundesliga, all leagues below dropped one tier. With the introduction of the Landesligas in 2017 as the new sixth tier, all leagues from the Verbandsligas below dropped one tier. The Verbandsliga Süd-West was renamed Verbandsliga West.
- ^{†} Playing SG Türk Spor/Itzehoer SV 09. As an on-the-field union, the club was not entitled to promotion.
- ^{‡} Playing as Itzehoer FC.

↑ Promoted	↓ Relegated
