= TSV Schilksee =

German football club

- Full name: Turn- und Sportverein Schilksee von 1947 e.V.
- Founded: 1947
- Ground: Jürgen-Lüthje-Arena
- Capacity: 2,500
- Chairman: Carsten Wehde
- League: none
- 2018–19: Oberliga Schleswig-Holstein (V), 16th (withdrawn)
- Website: https://www.tsv-schilksee.de
Home colours	Away colours

TSV Schilksee is a German association football club from the Schilksee suburb of Kiel, Schleswig-Holstein. The club's greatest success has been promotion to the tier four Regionalliga Nord in 2014, following a league championship in the Schleswig-Holstein-Liga.

The club also offers other sports like European handball, swimming and table tennis.

== History ==
Formed in 1947 TSV Schilksee played the majority of its history as a local amateur side. It dropped as far as the tier eight Kreisklasse A Kiel in the mid-2000s before rising through the league system again from 2009 onwards. The club won three promotions in four seasons, climbing from the Kreisklasse A via the Kreisliga and Verbandsliga to the tier five Schleswig-Holstein-Liga in 2013. The club finished eleventh in the league in its first season there before winning the league in 2014–15. The latter allowed the club to take part in the promotion round to the Regionalliga Nord, where it overcame Bremer SV and VfV 06 Hildesheim to win promotion. After just a season in the Regionalliga the club was relegated back to the Schleswig-Holstein-Liga in 2016, which was renamed Oberliga Schleswig-Holstein by the next season. Financial hardships and a loss of ability to be competitive led TSV to withdraw from league football in 2019 after an automatic relegation from the Oberliga for withdrawing from the league and missing three match days. TSV's results were expunged from the league table.

The club's now defunct women's team twice took part in the DFB-Pokal, in 2002–03 and 2003–04, reaching the second round once.

== Honours ==
The club's honours:

- Schleswig-Holstein-Liga: 2015
- Verbandsliga Schleswig-Holstein-Nord-Ost: 2013; runners-up 2012

== Recent seasons ==
The recent season-by-season performance of the club:

Season	Division	Tier	Position
2003–04	Bezirksliga 4	VI	15th ↓
2004–05	Kreisliga Kiel	VII	13th
2005–06	Kreisliga Kiel	VII	15th ↓
2006–07	Kreisklasse A Kiel	VIII	3rd ↑
2007–08	Kreisliga Kiel	VII	15th ↓
2008–09	Kreisklasse A Kiel	VIII	7th
2009–10	Kreisklasse A Kiel	VIII	1st ↑
2010–11	Kreisliga Kiel	VII	2nd ↑
2011–12	Verbandsliga Schleswig-Holstein-Nord-Ost	VI	2nd
2012–13	Verbandsliga Schleswig-Holstein-Nord-Ost	VI	1st ↑
2013–14	Schleswig-Holstein-Liga	V	11th
2014–15	Schleswig-Holstein-Liga	V	1st ↑
2015–16	Regionalliga Nord	IV	18th ↓
2016–17	Schleswig-Holstein-Liga	V	8th
2017–18	Oberliga Schleswig-Holstein	V	12th
2018–19	Oberliga Schleswig-Holstein	V	16th ↓
2019–20	inactive		

- With the introduction of the Regionalligas in 1994 and the 3. Liga in 2008 as the new third tier, below the 2. Bundesliga, all leagues below dropped one tier. The Schleswig-Holstein-Liga was renamed Oberliga Schleswig-Holstein in 2017.

↑ Promoted	↓ Relegated
