= TuS Hoisdorf =

German football club

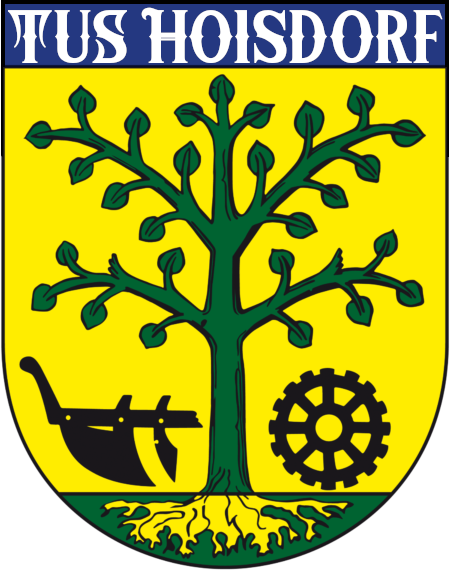
- Full name: Turn- und Sportverein Hoisdorf von 1958 e.V.
- Founded: 1958
- Ground: Schul- und Sportzentrum Waldstaße
- Capacity: 4,000
- League: Kreisliga Stormarn (VIII)
- 2015–16: 8th
- Website: https://tushoisdorf.de
Home colours	Away colours

Tus Hoisdorf is a German association football club from the municipality of Hoisdorf, Schleswig-Holstein. The footballers are part of a sports club that includes departments for badminton, gymnastics, table tennis, volleyball, and fitness programs.

== History ==
The little known club enjoyed its greatest success through the 1980s and 90s when it was part of third and fourth tier competition. Hoisdorf won its way into the Amateuroberliga Nord (III) in 1988 and spent a single season in the newly formed Regionalliga Nord (III) in 1994–95 before being relegated to the Oberliga Hamburg/Schleswig-Holstein (IV). During this period TuS twice appeared (1989–90) in the preliminary rounds of the DFB-Pokal (German Cup) tournament. After a second-place finish in the Oberliga in 1998, they took part in a failed promotion round playoff being beaten by BV Cloppenburg (2–1 win, 6–0 loss). Despite another second-place result in 2001, the team voluntarily withdrew from higher level regional play. The team competed in the Kreisklasse A (IX) after dropping down from Kreisliga Stormarn (VIII) in 2014 but won a league championship in 2015 and moved back up.

== Honours ==
The club's honours:

- Schleswig-Holstein-Liga: 1988
- Schleswig-Holstein Cup: 1988, 1989
