= Gruppenliga =

- Country: Germany
- Leagues: 7
- Level on pyramid: Level 7

The Gruppenliga (English: Football Group League) is the seventh tier of football in the German state of Hesse. The Gruppenligas were established in 2008, replacing the Bezirksoberligas in the state. Below the Gruppenligas sit the Kreisoberligas in Hesse.

== Gruppenligas ==
The Gruppenligas:

League	Promotion to	Relegation to
Gruppenliga Fulda	Verbandsliga Hessen-Nord	Kreisoberliga
Gruppenliga Kassel 1	Verbandsliga Hessen-Nord	Kreisoberliga
Gruppenliga Kassel 2	Verbandsliga Hessen-Nord	Kreisoberliga
Gruppenliga Gießen/Marburg	Verbandsliga Hessen-Mitte	Kreisoberliga
Gruppenliga Wiesbaden	Verbandsliga Hessen-Mitte	Kreisoberliga
Gruppenliga Darmstadt	Verbandsliga Hessen-Süd	Kreisoberliga
Gruppenliga Frankfurt-West	Verbandsliga Hessen-Süd	Kreisoberliga
Gruppenliga Frankfurt-Ost	Verbandsliga Hessen-Süd	Kreisoberliga
