= 1. FC Phönix Lübeck =

Association football club in Germany

Phönix Lübeck
- Full name: 1. FC Phönix im LBV Phönix von 1903 e. V.
- Founded: 13 January 1903; 123 years ago
- Ground: Stadion Flugplatz
- Capacity: 3,000
- Chairman: Thomas Laudi
- Head Coach: Christiano Adigo
- League: Regionalliga Nord (IV)
- 2025–26: Regionalliga Nord, 5th of 18
- Website: https://phoenix-luebeck.de
Home colours	Away colours

1. FC Phönix Lübeck is a German association football club from the city of Lübeck, Schleswig-Holstein. The club has, historically, played at highest level in Germany, with the last stint of this coming from 1957 to 1960 in the tier one Oberliga Nord. After the introduction of the Bundesliga in 1963 Phönix played in the tier two Regionalliga Nord from 1967 to 1974 but has since fallen to regional amateur level.

Phönix has made three appearances in the DFB-Pokal, the German Cup, in 1938, 1976, and 2024.

== History ==
LBV Phönix was formed in 1903 but the current club, 1. FC Phönix Lübeck, was established when the football department split from the mother club in 1971.

In post-First World War football the club experienced a first successful era from 1927 to 1930 when it advanced to the qualifying rounds of the Northern German football championship three consecutive times. It only made it to the first round proper once however, in 1930, where the club lost 5–2 to Hamburger SV.

The club played in the tier one Gauliga Nordmark from 1935 to 1938, when it was relegated again. It competed in the 1938 Tschammerpokal but lost 1–0 to Blau-Weiß 90 Berlin in the final qualifying round.

After the Second World War the club entered the tier two Landesliga Schleswig-Holstein where it consistently finished in top five of the league. It competed there, at times, with local rival VfB Lübeck and a runners-up finish behind the latter in 1957 took the team up to the Oberliga for the first time. Phönix played in the Oberliga Nord from 1957 to 1960 as a lower table side and was relegated again after three seasons. Back in what was now the Amateurliga Schleswig-Holstein the club dropped to the third tier in 1963 when the Bundesliga and the Regionalligas below were established. It mostly remained a top side and won the league in 1966–67.

Phönix played in the Regionalliga Nord from 1967 to 1974, when the league was disbanded in favor of the new 2. Bundesliga. In its seven Regionalliga seasons the club twice finished sixth as its best result but, even without the disbanding of the league, would have been relegated from the Regionalliga in 1974 as it finished last in that season.

Phönix became a founding member of the new tier three Oberliga Nord but was relegated after only one season in 1975. The club returned for just one more season to the league in 1978–79 but suffered immediate relegation again. A Schleswig-Holstein Cup win in 1976 qualified the club for the first round of the 1976–77 DFB-Pokal, where it lost 2–0 to Eintracht Bad Kreuznach.

An era of lower table finishes in what was now the Verbandsliga Schleswig-Holstein followed from 1979 onwards. After 1985 the club's results improved again but, after finishing last in the league in 1988–89, it was relegated from the top tier in Schleswig-Holstein for the first time in post-war football. It returned to the Verbandsliga in 1993 and, coming fifth, qualified for the new Oberliga Hamburg/Schleswig-Holstein in 1994.

Phönix became a founding member of the tier four Oberliga Hamburg/Schleswig-Holstein and finished fifth in its first season there but was relegated again in 1997. It briefly returned for a season in 1998–99 before dropping back down, withdrawing from the Oberliga to the tier seven Bezirksliga.

Since then the club has been fluctuating between the sixth and the seventh tier, earning promotion back to the tier six Verbandsliga Süd-Ost in 2015. In 2017 it qualified for the new tier-six Landesliga.

Following two promotions in 2019 and 2020 the club entered the Regionalliga Nord in 2020. This was the first appearance in the 4th tier since 1999.

== Season to season ==
The recent season-by-season performance of the club:

Season	Division	Tier	Position
2003–04	Bezirksliga Süd	VII	3rd
2004–05	Bezirksliga Süd	VII	2nd ↑
2005–06	Bezirksoberliga Süd	VI	8th
2006–07	Bezirksoberliga Süd	VI	4th
2007–08	Bezirksoberliga Süd	VI	15th ↓
2008–09	Kreisliga Lübeck-Lauenburg	VII	4th
2009–10	Kreisliga Lübeck-Lauenburg	VII	11th
2010–11	Kreisliga Lübeck-Lauenburg	VII	13th
2011–12	Kreisliga Lübeck	VII	1st ↑
2012–13	Verbandsliga Süd-Ost	VI	17th ↓
2013–14	Kreisliga Lübeck	VII	3rd
2014–15	Kreisliga Lübeck	VII	1st ↑
2015–16	Verbandsliga Süd-Ost	VI	12th
2016–17	Verbandsliga Süd-Ost	VI	6th
2017–18	Landesliga Holstein	VI	3rd
2018–19	Landesliga Holstein	VI	2nd ↑
2019–20	Oberliga Schleswig-Holstein	V	2nd ↑
2020–21	Regionalliga Nord	IV	4th
2021–22	Regionalliga Nord	IV	11th
2022–23	Regionalliga Nord	IV	13th
2023–24	Regionalliga Nord	IV	3rd
2024–25	Regionalliga Nord	IV	5th
2025–26	Regionalliga Nord	IV	5th

- With the introduction of the Regionalligas in 1994 and the 3. Liga in 2008 as the new third tier, below the 2. Bundesliga, all leagues below dropped one tier. With the introduction of the Landesligas as the new sixth tier, above the Verbandsligas, all leagues below further dropped one tier. The Verbandsliga Süd-Ost was renamed Verbandsliga Süd.

↑ Promoted	↓ Relegated

== Players ==
=== Current squad ===
As of 10 September 2026

Note: Flags indicate national team as defined under FIFA eligibility rules; some limited exceptions apply. Players may hold more than one non-FIFA nationality.

No.	Pos.	Nation	Player
1	GK	LUX	Tim Kips
2	DF	GER	Louis Grobauer
3	DF	GER	Jannes Vollert
4	DF	GER	Karim Hüneburg
5	DF	GER	Joshua Krüger
6	MF	GER	Michel Dammeier
7	MF	GER	Julius Kliti
8	MF	ITA	Fabio Maiolo
10	MF	GER	Jonathan Stöver
11	FW	GER	Anton Ihde
12	FW	GER	Lennard Luth
13	MF	NED	Julian Markvoort
14	MF	GER	Moritz Kretzer

No.	Pos.	Nation	Player
17	FW	GER	Miguel Fernandes
18	MF	BIH	Omar Rahimić
19	MF	GER	Julian Boccaccio
20	MF	GER	Christen Mensah
21	MF	UKR	Mika Meyer
22	DF	NED	Philippe Markvoort
23	FW	GER	Kilian Skolik
24	FW	GER	Benjamin Luis
27	DF	GER	Avid Krogmann
28	DF	GRE	Jannis Farr
30	DF	GER	Daniel Haritonov
32	GK	GRE	Christopher Barkmann
80	FW	GER	Ousman Touray

=== Former players ===
The following players have been elected into the club's hall of fame:

- Hans Joachim Aido
- Heiko Berner
- Siegfried Beyer
- Wolfgang Bordel
- Otto Hartz
- Lothar Hinrichs
- Hans-Joachim Ihde
- Peter Nogly
- Jürgen Stars
- Gregor Wintersteller

== Honours ==
- Schleswig-Holstein-Liga: 1966–67, 1977–78
- Kreisliga Lübeck: 2011–12, 2014–15
- Schleswig-Holstein Cup: 1975–76, 2024, 2026
