= Jannes Vollert =

German footballer

Personal information
- Date of birth: 21 January 1998 (age 28)
- Place of birth: Rendsburg, Germany
- Height: 1.86 m (6 ft 1 in)
- Position: Centre back

Team information
- Current team: Phönix Lübeck
- Number: 3

Youth career
- –2013: Holstein Kiel
- 2013–2017: Werder Bremen

Senior career*
| Years | Team | Apps | (Gls) |
| 2017–2021 | Werder Bremen II | 37 | (0) |
| 2019–2021 | → Hallescher FC (loan) | 54 | (2) |
| 2021–2024 | Hallescher FC | 66 | (0) |
| 2024 | SV Babelsberg 03 | 18 | (0) |
| 2025– | Phönix Lübeck | 55 | (4) |

International career
| 2014 | Germany U16 | 6 | (0) |
| 2014 | Germany U17 | 1 | (0) |
| 2015 | Germany U18 | 2 | (0) |
- * Club domestic league appearances and goals as of 22 September 2026

Jannes Vollert (born 21 January 1998) is a German professional footballer who plays as a centre back for Phönix Lübeck.

== Career ==
In June 2013, Vollert joined Werder Bremen from Holstein Kiel.

During the 2017–18 season he became a regular starter for the club's reserves playing in the 3. Liga making 24 appearances. In June 2018, following the team's relegation, he agreed a contract extension.

On 5 June 2019, it was confirmed that Vollert had extended his contract with Werder Bremen until June 2022 and would be loaned out to 3. Liga club Hallescher FC until June 2021. In two seasons at Hallescher FC he made 54 league appearances scoring two goals.

In June 2021, Hallescher FC announced the permanent signing of Vollert for the 2021–22 season.
