= Verbandsliga =

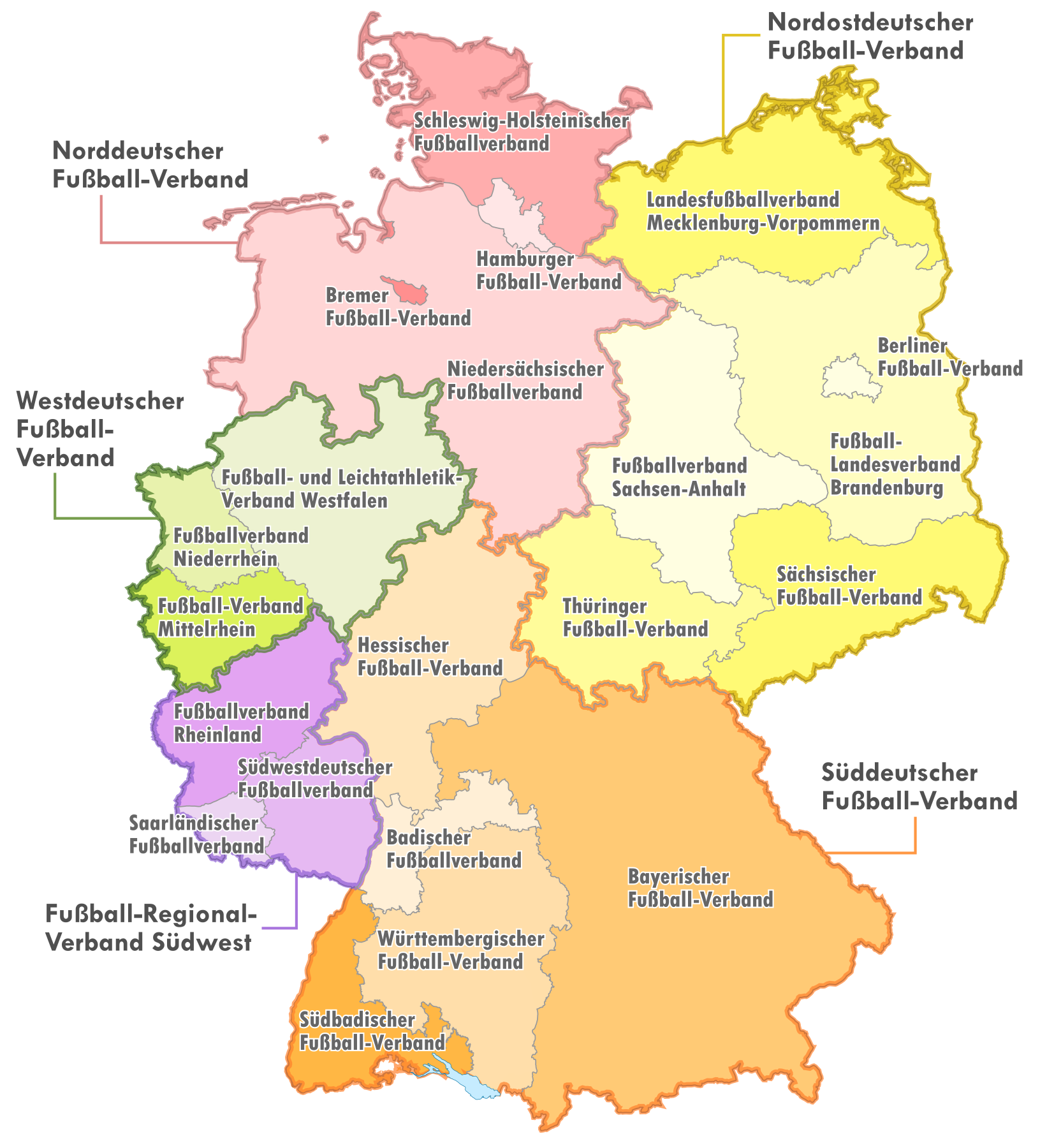
- Organising bodies: State associations of the DFB
- Country: Germany
- State: 11 states
- Leagues: 21
- Level on pyramid: Level 6 & 7
- Promotion to: Oberliga
- Relegation to: Various (see text)

The Verbandsliga (English: Football Association League) is the tier-six football league in the German football league system, covering the area of a Bundesland or a regional part of such Bundesland.

As the German football league system below the tier-four Regionalliga is organised individually by the 21 state member associations of the nationwide governing body German Football Association (Deutscher Fußball-Bund), the league structure varies somewhat from state to state. Therefore the Verbandsliga does not exist in every Bundesland. In North Rhine-Westphalia (Middle Rhine and Lower Rhine), Saxony, Thuringia, Hamburg, Lower Saxony, Bremen, and Bavaria, the corresponding sixth tier is called the Landesliga, whereas the Landesliga is only a tier-seven league in most of the other German states. North Rhine-Westphalia, Rhineland-Palatinate, and Baden-Württemberg are divided into two or three state member associations, each running their own league system. Additionally, in some regions or states, as there are Hesse, Westphalia, and Schleswig-Holstein the Verbandsliga is operated in two or more groups running in parallel.

In recent years, a number of leagues have dropped the Verband out of their league name, preferring to call themselves just by the region or Bundesland they are from. The Verbandsliga Berlin became the Berlin-Liga, the Verbandsliga Brandenburg became the Brandenburg-Liga, the Verbandsliga Westfalen became the Westfalenliga and the Verbandsliga Rheinland became the Rheinlandliga. The Verbandsliga Mittelrhein became the Mittelrheinliga and the Verbandsliga Niederrhein became the Niederrheinliga, with both leagues elevated to Oberliga status in 2012.

== Verbandsligas ==
The Verbandsligas:

League	Tier	Promotion to	Relegation to	Formed
Verbandsliga Hessen-Nord	VI	Hessenliga	Gruppenliga Fulda Gruppenliga Kassel 1 Gruppenliga Kassel 2	1964
Verbandsliga Hessen-Mitte	VI	Hessenliga	Gruppenliga Wiesbaden Gruppenliga Gießen/Marburg	1964
Verbandsliga Hessen-Süd	VI	Hessenliga	Gruppenliga Darmstadt Gruppenliga Frankfurt-West Gruppenliga Frankfurt-Ost	1964
Verbandsliga Saarland Nordost Verbandsliga Saarland Südwest ^{1}	VII	Saarlandliga	Landesliga Saarland-Nord/Ost Landesliga Saarland-Süd/West	1978
Rheinlandliga	VI	Oberliga Rheinland-Pfalz/Saar	Bezirksliga Rheinland-Ost Bezirksliga Rheinland-Mitte Bezirksliga Rheinland-West	1978
Verbandsliga Südwest	VI	Oberliga Rheinland-Pfalz/Saar	Landesliga Südwest-Ost Landesliga Südwest-West	1978
Verbandsliga Nordbaden	VI	Oberliga Baden-Württemberg	Landesliga Mittelbaden Landesliga Odenwald Landesliga Rhein/Neckar	1978
Verbandsliga Südbaden	VI	Oberliga Baden-Württemberg	Landesliga Südbaden 1 Landesliga Südbaden 2 Landesliga Südbaden 3	1978
Verbandsliga Württemberg	VI	Oberliga Baden-Württemberg	Landesliga Württemberg 1 Landesliga Württemberg 2 Landesliga Württemberg 3 Landesliga Württemberg 4	1978
Westfalenliga 1 Nordost Westfalenliga 2 Südwest^{2}	VI	Oberliga Westfalen	Landesliga Westfalen 1 Ost Landesliga Westfalen 2 Süd Landesliga Westfalen 3 West Landesliga Westfalen 4 Nord	1956
Berlin-Liga	VI	NOFV-Oberliga Nord	Landesliga Berlin 1 Landesliga Berlin 2	1992
Brandenburg-Liga	VI	NOFV-Oberliga Nord	Landesliga Brandenburg-Nord Landesliga Brandenburg-Süd	1990
Verbandsliga Mecklenburg-Vorpommern	VI	NOFV-Oberliga Nord	Landesliga Mecklenburg-Vorpommern-Nord Landesliga Mecklenburg-Vorpommern-Ost Landesliga Mecklenburg-Vorpommern-West	1991
Verbandsliga Sachsen-Anhalt	VI	NOFV-Oberliga Süd	Landesliga Sachsen-Anhalt-Nord Landesliga Sachsen-Anhalt-Süd	1990
Verbandsliga Schleswig-Holstein-Nord ^{3}	VII	Landesliga Schleswig-Holstein	Kreisliga Flensburg Kreisliga Nordfriesland Kreisliga Rendsburg-Eckernförde Kreisliga Schleswig	2017
Verbandsliga Schleswig-Holstein-Ost	VII	Landesliga Schleswig-Holstein	Kreisliga Kiel Kreisliga Plön	2017
Verbandsliga Schleswig-Holstein-Süd-West	VII	Landesliga Schleswig-Holstein	Kreisliga Lauenburg Kreisliga Segeberg Kreisliga Stormarn	2008
Verbandsliga Schleswig-Holstein-Süd-Ost	VII	Landesliga Schleswig-Holstein	Kreisliga Lübeck Kreisliga Ostholstein Kreisliga Segeberg Kreisliga Stormarn	2008
Verbandsliga Schleswig-Holstein-West	VII	Landesliga Schleswig-Holstein	Kreisliga Plön Kreisliga Rendsburg-Eckernförde Kreisliga West (Steinburg)	2017

- Some of the Verbandsligen have existed prior to their mentioned formation date under a different name. Dates given are when the leagues changed to the name Verbandsliga.
- ^{1} The Verbandsliga Saarland is only a tier-seven league from 2009 onwards, after the Saarlandliga was introduced as the new tier-six league.
- ^{2} The Westfalenliga is operated in two parallel groups with teams probably re-allocated according to geographical needs every new season. The four groups of Landesliga below the can feed either Westfalenliga group according to geographical needs.
- ^{3} The Verbandsliga Schleswig-Holstein is a tier-seven league from 2017 onwards with the introduction of the Landesliga Schleswig-Holstein as the new tier-six league.

== Clubs in the Verbandsligen ==
- Verbandsliga Hessen-Nord * Verbandsliga Hessen-Mitte * Verbandsliga Hessen-Süd * Verbandsliga Rheinland * Verbandsliga Saarland
- Verbandsliga Südwest * Verbandsliga Nordbaden * Verbandsliga Südbaden * Verbandsliga Württemberg
- Berlin-Liga * Brandenburg-Liga * Verbandsliga Mecklenburg-Vorpommern * Verbandsliga Sachsen-Anhalt * Verbandsliga Westfalen 1 * Verbandsliga Westfalen 2
- Verbandsliga Schleswig-Holstein-Nord * Verbandsliga Schleswig-Holstein-Ost * Verbandsliga Schleswig-Holstein-Süd-West * Verbandsliga Schleswig-Holstein-Süd-Ost * Verbandsliga Schleswig-Holstein-West
