= SV Henstedt-Ulzburg =

German association football club

- Full name: SV Henstedt-Ulzburg e.V. (SVHU)
- Founded: 1963; 62 years ago
- Ground: Sportanlage am Schäferkampsweg
- Capacity: 1,500
- League: Verbandsliga Schleswig-Holstein-Süd-West (VI)
- 2015–16: Schleswig-Holstein-Liga (V), 16th (relegated)
- Website: https://sv-hu.de
Home colours

SV Henstedt-Ulzburg is a German association football club based in Henstedt-Ulzburg, Schleswig-Holstein. The footballers are part of a 1,500 member sports club that also has departments for athletics, handball, table tennis, and tennis, as well as therapeutic sport.

== History ==
Historical logo of SV Henstedt-Rhen.

The football side was formed in 1963 as Sportverein Henstedt-Rhen and recently (2014) advanced to the Schleswig-Holstein-Liga. The club plays its home matches in the Sportanlage am Schäferkampsweg, which has a capacity of 2,000.

After playing in the tier five Schleswig-Holstein-Liga from 2008 to 2013 and, again, from 2014 to 2016, the club was relegated to the Verbandsliga at the end of the 2015–16 season.

== Honours ==
The club's honours:

- Verbandsliga Schleswig-Holstein: 2006
