= SC Weiche Flensburg 08 =

German football club

- Full name: Sportclub Weiche Flensburg von 1908 e.V.
- Founded: 1908
- Ground: Manfred-Werner-Stadion
- Capacity: 2,500
- Chairman: Hans-Lothar Suhr
- Manager: Thomas Seeliger
- League: Regionalliga Nord (IV)
- 2025–26: Regionalliga Nord, 9th of 18

SC Weiche Flensburg 08 is a German association football club from the Weiche suburb of Flensburg, Schleswig-Holstein. Apart from football the club also offers other sports like volleyball and table tennis.

Before July 2017, the club was known as ETSV Weiche. The club's greatest success has been to earn promotion to the tier four Regionalliga Nord in 2012. The club is associated with the German railways, as evidenced by the term railway sports club in its former prefix ETSV (German: Eisenbahner Turn- und Sportverein). Weiche is the German term for railroad switch but also the name of the Flensburg suburb the club hails from.

== History ==
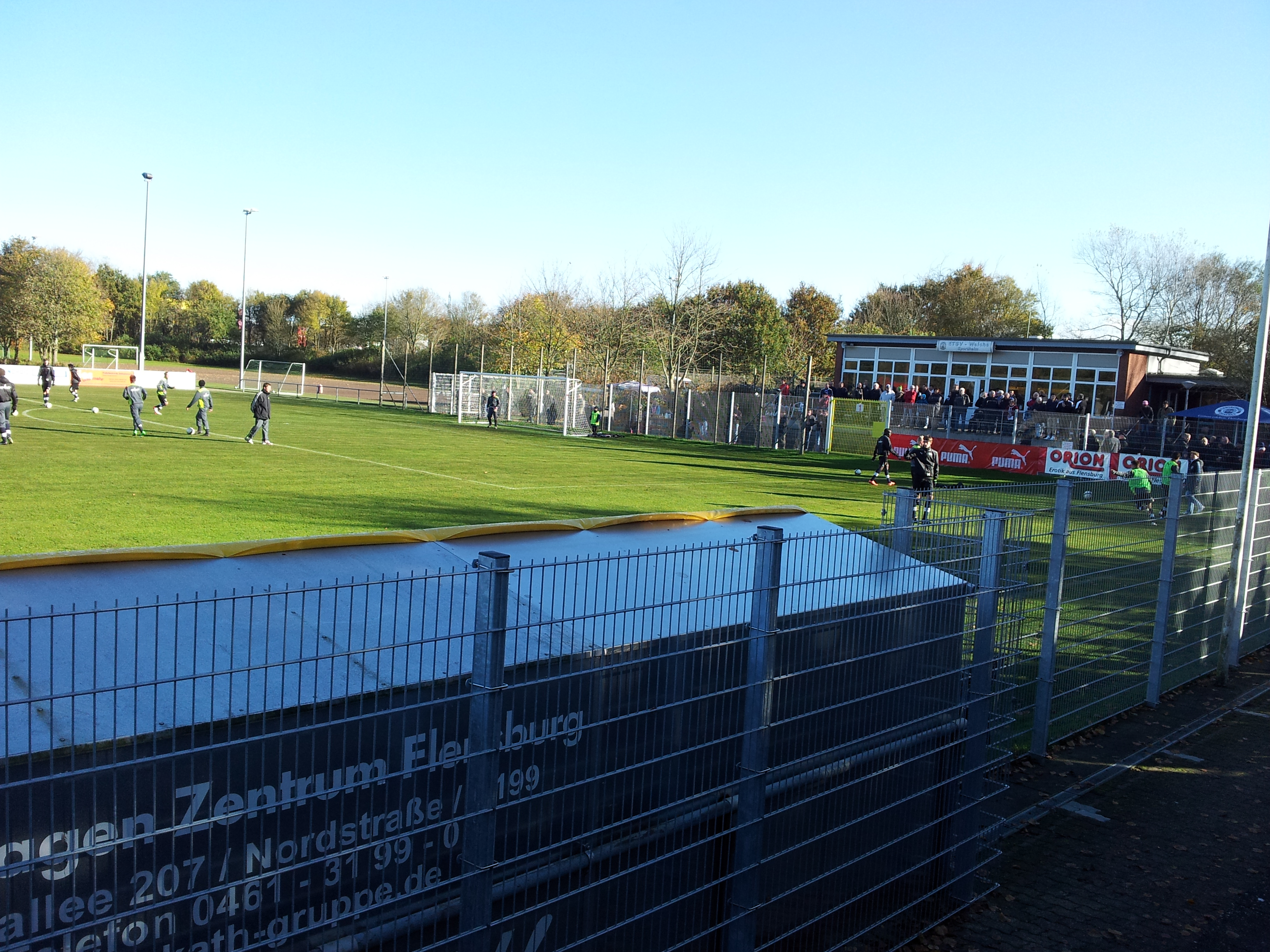
Manfred-Werner-Stadion, home ground of Weiche Flensburg.

Former logo as ETSV Weiche.

The club was formed as Reichsbahn-Sportverein Flensburg-Weiche in 1908. In 1933, the Weiche was affected by the rise of the Nazis to power and came under the control of the Reichssportführer. By 1940, with the effects of the Second World War, activities within the club came to a standstill. Despite early efforts after the war in 1945 the club took until April 1947 to reform, now as ESV Flensburg-Weiche. The football department however left the club in 1949 to form TSV Weiche-West. From 1962 onwards the two clubs started discussing a merger for the first time. Animosity between the two clubs however prevented progress until 1971, when the two finally agreed on a merger.

The football department of ETSV Weiche was formed in 1932 but left the club in 1949 to form the TSV Weiche-West. In 1957 this team won the local Kreisliga and earned promotion to the tier three 2. Amateurliga Schleswig-Holstein Nord. Weiche-West played in this league until it was renamed to Bezirksliga Schleswig-Holstein Nord in 1968, with a runners-up finish in 1961 as its best result. The club continued in the Bezirksliga after 1968, from 1971 onwards as ETSV Weiche. Throughout the 26 seasons in the 2. Amateurliga and Bezirksliga the club rarely challenged for the championship but, in 1982–83, it finally won this league and earned promotion to the Landesliga Schleswig-Holstein Nord. In this league, in 1983–84, the club came a distant last and was promptly relegated again. Another decade in the Bezirksliga followed until Weiche could win the league again in 1994 and return to the Landesliga. Three Landesliga seasons followed in which the club struggled against relegation each year and finally dropped down again in 1997. Weiche missed out on a place in the new Bezirksoberliga in 1999, a league that replaced the Landesliga above the Bezirksliga but won the later in the following year and was promoted again.

Weiche spend the next seven seasons in the Bezirksoberliga, winning the league in 2006–07 and qualifying for the Verbandsliga Schleswig-Holstein, the states highest league, for the first time. The 2007–08 season was the last of the Verbandsliga in this format. From 2008 the league was renamed Schleswig-Holstein-Liga and the four leagues below received the name Verbandsliga. Weiche did not qualify for the new league and had to stay at Verbandsliga level, being grouped in the Verbandsliga Schleswig-Holstein-Nord-West. It came second in its Verbandsliga division in 2009 and was promoted to the Schleswig-Holstein-Liga. Three seasons at this level followed before the 2011–12 season saw the club finish runners-up in the Schleswig-Holstein-Liga and being promoted alongside champions VfR Neumünster.

Since 2012 the club has played in the tier four Regionalliga Nord, finishing in the upper half of the table each season. In March 2016 it was announced that the club planned a merger with local rival Flensburg 08, and in November of that year both clubs agreed that Flensburg 08 would be merged into ETSV Weiche at the end of June 2017. The club subsequently changed its name into SC Weiche Flensburg 08.

== Current squad ==
As of 6 September 2026

Note: Flags indicate national team as defined under FIFA eligibility rules; some limited exceptions apply. Players may hold more than one non-FIFA nationality.

No.	Pos.	Nation	Player
2	DF	GER	Bjarne Schleemann
3	DF	GER	Torben Marten
4	DF	GER	Brandolf Duah
5	DF	BEL	Kevin Ntika
6	MF	GER	Benjamin Lamce
7	MF	GER	Alexander Laukart
8	MF	GER	Raul Celotto
9	FW	GER	Nick Selutin
10	MF	GER	Marcel Cornils
11	MF	MKD	Ilir Serifi
12	GK	GER	Nils Bock
14	FW	GER	Randy Gyamenah
16	DF	GER	Daniel Schaen
17	FW	GER	Rasmus Tobinski

No.	Pos.	Nation	Player
18	FW	GER	Joshua Hansen
19	MF	GER	Thies Richter
20	MF	DEN	Samuel Hust
21	DF	GER	Ole Wagner
22	DF	SUI	Uchechi Duru
24	MF	GER	Joshua Nwokoma
26	FW	GER	Ibrahim Ali
27	DF	GER	Tanyel Eckstein
28	DF	GER	Theo Behrmann
29	MF	UKR	Maksym Tytarenko
30	GK	GER	Bjarne Schneider
35	GK	GER	Ronny Seibt
48	MF	KOS	Erolind Krasniqi

== Honours ==
The club's honours:

- Regionalliga Nord
  - Champions: 2017–18
- Schleswig-Holstein-Liga
  - Runners-up: 2012
- Verbandsliga Schleswig-Holstein-Nord (formerly Nord-West)
  - Runners-up: 2009
- 2. Amateurliga Schleswig-Holstein Nord
  - Runners-up: 1961
- Bezirksoberliga Nord
  - Champions: 2002, 2007
- Bezirksliga Nord
  - Champions: 1983, 1994, 2000
  - Runners-up: 1987
- Schleswig-Holstein Cup
  - Champions: 1957, 2018, 2021

== Recent seasons ==
The recent season-by-season performance of the club:

Season	Division	Tier	Position
1999–2000	Bezirksliga Nord	VII	1st ↑
2000–01	Bezirksoberliga Nord	VI	4th
2001–02	Bezirksoberliga Nord	VI	1st
2002–03	Bezirksoberliga Nord	VI	10th
2003–04	Bezirksoberliga Nord	VI	11th
2004–05	Bezirksoberliga Nord	VI	
2005–06	Bezirksoberliga Nord	VI	4th
2006–07	Bezirksoberliga Nord	VI	1st ↑
2007–08	Verbandsliga Schleswig-Holstein	V	14th
2008–09	Verbandsliga Schleswig-Holstein-Nord-West	VI	2nd ↑
2009–10	Schleswig-Holstein-Liga	V	9th
2010–11	Schleswig-Holstein-Liga	V	6th
2011–12	Schleswig-Holstein-Liga	V	2nd ↑
2012–13	Regionalliga Nord	IV	7th
2013–14	Regionalliga Nord	IV	6th
2014–15	Regionalliga Nord	IV	5th
2015–16	Regionalliga Nord	IV	3rd
2016–17	Regionalliga Nord	IV	2nd
2017–18	Regionalliga Nord	IV	1st
2018–19	Regionalliga Nord	IV	4th
2019–20	Regionalliga Nord	IV	3rd
2020–21	Regionalliga Nord (North Group)	IV	1st
2021–22	Regionalliga Nord (North Group)	IV	2nd
2022–23	Regionalliga Nord	IV	5th
2023–24	Regionalliga Nord	IV	15th
2024–25	Regionalliga Nord	IV	13th
2025–26	Regionalliga Nord	IV	9th

- With the introduction of the Regionalligas in 1994 and the 3. Liga in 2008 as the new third tier, below the 2. Bundesliga, all leagues below dropped one tier.

Key

↑ Promoted	↓ Relegated
