= Schleswig-Holstein Cup =

- Founded: 1953
- Region: Schleswig-Holstein, Germany
- Qualifier for: DFB-Pokal
- Current champions: Phönix Lübeck (2025–26)
- Most championships: VfB Lübeck (18 titles)

The Schleswig-Holstein Cup (German: Schleswig-Holstein Pokal) is one of the 21 regional cup competitions of German football. It is a qualifying competition for the German Cup, with the winner of the competition being automatically qualified for the first round of the German Cup in the following season. For sponsorship reasons, the official name of the competition is SHFV-LOTTO-Pokal.

== History ==
The competition was first held in 1953–54, with TSV Brunsbüttelkoog being the first winner. It has since been held annually, with Holstein Kiel (16 titles) and VfB Lübeck (16 titles) being most successful teams. The 2011 final was held on 3 June between those two sides, with Holstein winning the game 3–0.

== Modus ==
All teams from Schleswig-Holstein playing in the 3. Liga and the Regionalliga Nord plus the eleven regional cup winners (Kreispokale) are qualified for the first round and the competition is played in single-game knock-out format.

== Winners ==
The winners of the competition:

Club	Wins	Years
VfB Lübeck	18	1956, 1987, 1992, 1995, 1998, 1999, 2000, 2001, 2006, 2009, 2010, 2012, 2015, 2016, 2019, 2022, 2023, 2025
Holstein Kiel	16	1961^{‡}, 1962^{‡}, 1966^{‡}, 1978, 1983, 1991, 1994, 1996, 2002, 2003, 2005, 2007, 2008, 2011, 2014, 2017
Itzehoer SV	4	1955, 1964, 1975, 1985
VfR Neumünster	3	1974, 2004, 2013
Weiche Flensburg	3	1957, 2018, 2021
Phönix Lübeck	3	1976, 2024, 2026
TSV Pansdorf	2	1972, 1997
FC Kilia Kiel	2	1990, 1993
TuS Hoisdorf	2	1988, 1989
Heider SV	2	1979, 1982
TSV Westerland	2	1970, 1973
Büdelsdorfer TSV	2	1963, 1967
SV Friedrichsort	2	1958, 1959
Blau-Weiß Friedrichstadt	1	1986
VfL Kellinghusen	1	1984
BSC Brunsbüttel	1	1981
TSV Plön	1	1980
Rendsburger TSV	1	1977
Eichholzer SV	1	1971
VfB Kiel	1	1969
Schleswig 06	1	1968
Borussia Kiel	1	1965
Frisia Husum	1	1960
TSV Brunsbüttelkoog	1	1954
SV Todesfelde	1	2020

- ^{‡} Won by reserve team.
