= Landesliga =

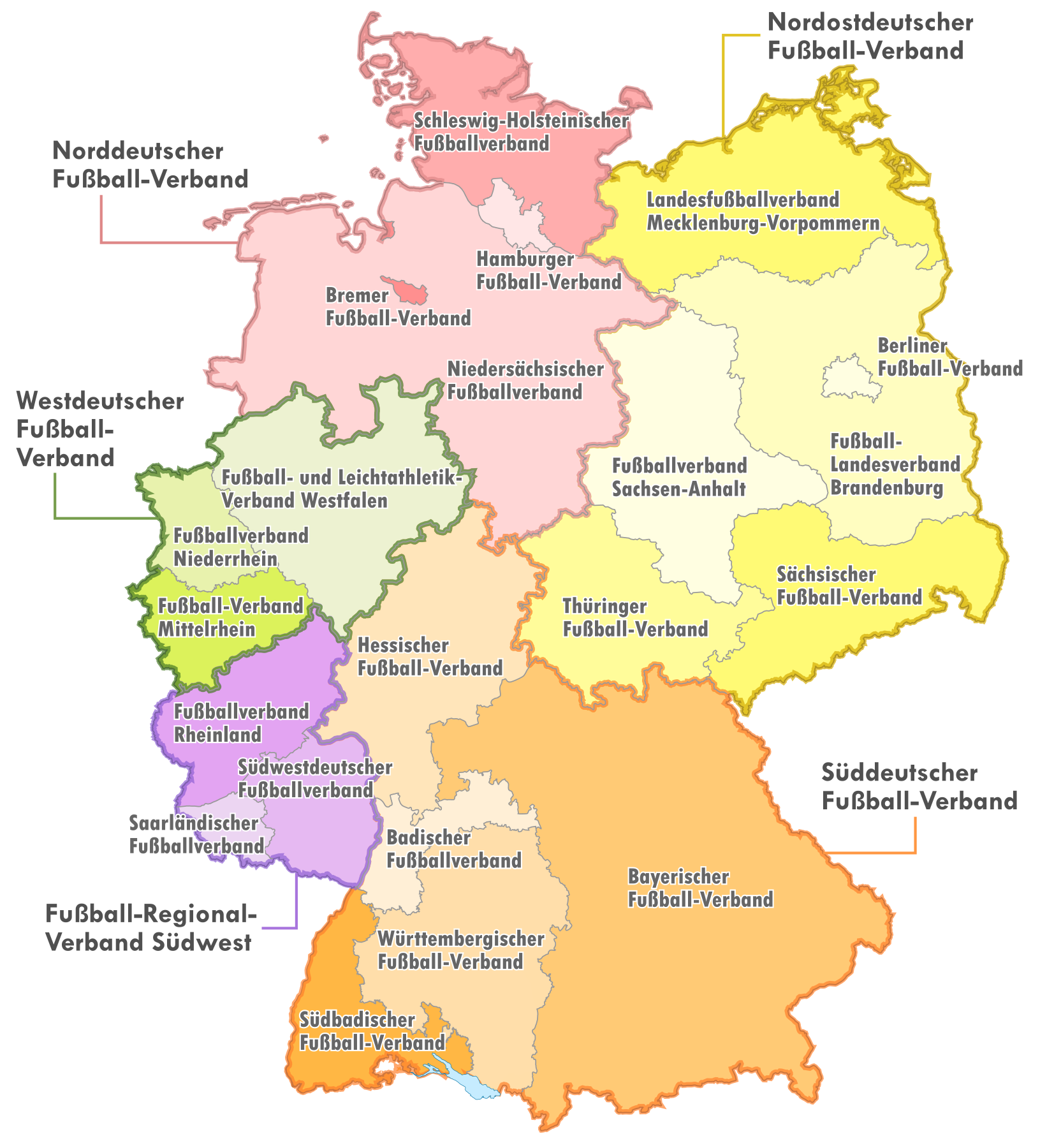
- Organising bodies: State associations of the DFB
- Country: Germany
- State: 15 states
- Leagues: 67
- Level on pyramid: Level 6, 7 and 8
- Promotion to: Oberliga, Verbandsliga (some)
- Relegation to: Various

The Landesliga (English: Football State League) is a tier of football in some states of the German football league system.

In Bavaria, Saxony, Thuringia, Bremen, Lower Saxony and Hamburg, the Landesligas are set right below the Oberliga and therefore are the sixth tier. The reason for this is that Bavaria, Hamburg, Lower Saxony, and Bremen are the only places in Germany where the Oberliga, the State, and the Verband are geographically the same, while the other two states simply chose to call their leagues Landesligas when establishing them in 1990. In the Middle Rhine and Lower Rhine regions of North Rhine-Westphalia it is also, since 2012, the sixth tier.

In Baden-Württemberg, Rhineland-Palatinate (southwestern part only), North Rhine-Westphalia (Westphalia), Mecklenburg-Western Pomerania, Brandenburg, Saxony-Anhalt, and Berlin, the Landesliga is the seventh tier, below the Verbandsliga. In the Saarland, the Landesligas are set as the eighth tier.

Typically, in each Bundesland, the Landesligas are divided into different Staffeln or "divisions". In Bavaria, the Landesliga is divided into five divisions, South-West, South-East, Central, North-West, and North-East. In Saxony, Bremen, and Thuringia, the Landesliga is in a single division format. In Hamburg, it consists of two divisions.

In 2017, Schleswig-Holstein introduced Landesligas at the sixth tier, leaving Hesse as the only German state not to have Landesligas. The Rheinland region of Rhineland-Palatinate also operates without such a league.

In Brandenburg, Mecklenburg-Western Pomerania, Saxony-Anhalt, and Thuringia the league below the Landesligas is the Landesklasse (English: State Class). Also in 2017, Mecklenburg-Western Pomerania reduced the number of Landesligas and Landesklasses to 2 and 4 divisions respectively, but temporarily reverted them to 3 and 5 divisions for two seasons in 2020. Saxony renamed its Landesklasse to Sachsenklasse in 2024.

== Leagues ==
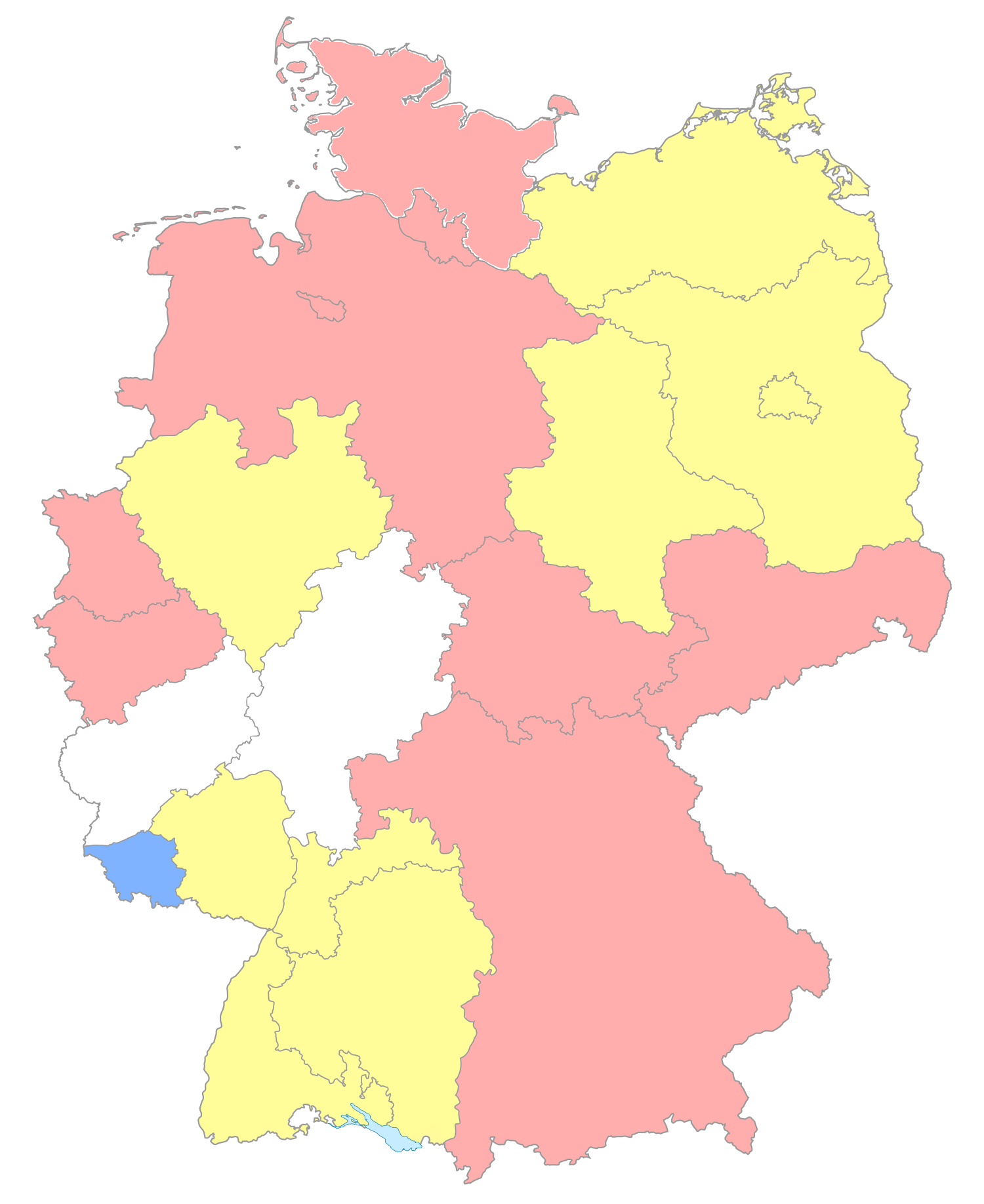
The Landesligas: Tier six (red) seven (yellow) and eight (blue) leagues. White denotes areas without Landesligas.

=== Tier-VI Landesligas ===
Of the 69 Landesligas in Germany 20 are set at tier six of the German football league system, these being:

League	State	Region	Promotion to	Relegation to
Sachsenliga	Saxony		NOFV-Oberliga Süd	Sachsenklasse Nord; Sachsenklasse Ost; Sachsenklasse West
Thüringenliga	Thuringia		NOFV-Oberliga Süd	Landesklasse Nord; Landesklasse Ost; Landesklasse Süd
Landesliga Bayern-Südwest	Bavaria	Southwest	Bayernliga	Bezirksliga
Landesliga Bayern-Südost	Bavaria	Southeast	Bayernliga	Bezirksliga
Landesliga Bayern-Mitte	Bavaria	Central	Bayernliga	Bezirksliga
Landesliga Bayern-Nordwest	Bavaria	Northwest	Bayernliga	Bezirksliga
Landesliga Bayern-Nordost	Bavaria	Northeast	Bayernliga	Bezirksliga
Landesliga Bremen	Bremen		Bremen-Liga	Bezirksliga Bremen; Bezirksliga Bremerhaven
Landesliga Hamburg-Hammonia	Hamburg		Oberliga Hamburg	Bezirksliga Nord; Bezirksliga Ost; Bezirksliga Süd; Bezirksliga West
Landesliga Hamburg-Hansa	Hamburg		Oberliga Hamburg	Bezirksliga Nord; Bezirksliga Ost; Bezirksliga Süd; Bezirksliga West
Landesliga Niederrhein 1 Landesliga Niederrhein 2 Landesliga Niederrhein 3	North Rhine-Westphalia	Lower Rhine	Oberliga Niederrhein	Bezirksliga
Landesliga Mittelrhein 1 Landesliga Mittelrhein 2	North Rhine-Westphalia	Middle Rhine	Oberliga Mittelrhein	Bezirksliga
Landesliga Braunschweig	Lower Saxony	Braunschweig	Niedersachsenliga	Bezirksliga Braunschweig 1 Bezirksliga Braunschweig 2 Bezirksliga Braunschweig 3 Bezirksliga Braunschweig 4
Landesliga Hannover	Lower Saxony	Hannover	Niedersachsenliga	Bezirksliga Hannover 1 Bezirksliga Hannover 2 Bezirksliga Hannover 3 Bezirksliga Hannover 4
Landesliga Lüneburg	Lower Saxony	Lüneburg	Niedersachsenliga	Bezirksliga Lüneburg 1 Bezirksliga Lüneburg 2 Bezirksliga Lüneburg 3 Bezirksliga Lüneburg 4
Landesliga Weser-Ems	Lower Saxony	Weser-Ems	Niedersachsenliga	Bezirksliga Weser-Ems 1 Bezirksliga Weser-Ems 2 Bezirksliga Weser-Ems 3 Bezirksliga Weser-Ems 4 Bezirksliga Weser-Ems 5
Landesliga Schleswig-Holstein	Schleswig-Holstein	Schleswig; Holstein	Oberliga Schleswig-Holstein	Verbandsliga Nord; Verbandsliga Ost; Verbandsliga Süd; Verbandsliga West

- The Landesligas of Thuringia and Saxony are unique in their naming as every other league in Germany of this standing carries the name Verbandsliga. This was done so simply by choice of the local football associations in Saxony and Thuringia and the name could be changed to Verbandsliga if they wish to do so. Bavaria does not have this option however, since its Landesligas are not the highest leagues in the Verband. This position is held by the Oberligas in this state.

=== Tier VII-Landesligas ===
Apart from the above-mentioned states, Landesligas also exist in the states of Baden-Württemberg, Rhineland-Palatinate (in the southwest part only), North Rhine-Westphalia (Westphalia), Mecklenburg-Western Pomerania, Brandenburg, Saxony-Anhalt, Berlin and as Landesklasse, in Saxony and Thuringia as tier seven leagues, below the Verbandsligas:

Leagues	State	Region	Promotion to	Relegation to
Landesliga Württemberg 1 Landesliga Württemberg 2 Landesliga Württemberg 3 Landesliga Württemberg 4	Baden-Württemberg	Württemberg	Verbandsliga Württemberg	Bezirksliga
Landesliga Mittelbaden; Landesliga Odenwald; Landesliga Rhein/Neckar	Baden-Württemberg	Baden (North)	Verbandsliga Baden	Kreisliga
Landesliga Südbaden 1 Landesliga Südbaden 2 Landesliga Südbaden 3	Baden-Württemberg	Baden (South)	Verbandsliga Südbaden	Bezirksliga
Landesliga Südwest Ost; Landesliga Südwest West	Rhineland-Palatinate	Southwest	Verbandsliga Südwest	Bezirksliga
Landesliga Westfalen 1 Landesliga Westfalen 2 Landesliga Westfalen 3 Landesliga Westfalen 4	North Rhine-Westphalia	Westphalia	Westfalenliga 1 Westfalenliga 2	Bezirksliga
Landesliga Mecklenburg-Vorpommern-Ost; Landesliga Mecklenburg-Vorpommern-West	Mecklenburg-Western Pomerania		Verbandsliga Mecklenburg-Vorpommern	Landesklasse
Landesliga Brandenburg-Nord; Landesliga Brandenburg-Süd	Brandenburg		Brandenburg-Liga	Landesklasse
Landesliga Sachsen-Anhalt-Nord; Landesliga Sachsen-Anhalt-Mitte; Landesliga Sachsen-Anhalt-Süd	Saxony-Anhalt		Verbandsliga Sachsen-Anhalt	Landesklasse
Landesliga Berlin 1 Landesliga Berlin 2	Berlin		Berlin-Liga	Bezirksliga
Sachsenklasse Nord; Sachsenklasse Ost; Sachsenklasse West	Saxony		Sachsenliga	Kreisoberliga
Landesklasse Thüringen 1 Landesklasse Thüringen 2 Landesklasse Thüringen 3	Thuringia		Thüringenliga	Kreisoberliga

=== Tier VIII-Landesligas ===
Uniquely, the Saarland has the Landesligas as the eighth tier of its league system; in Brandenburg, Mecklenburg-Western Pomerania, and Saxony-Anhalt the equivalent tier is Landesklasse.

Leagues	State	Region	Promotion to	Relegation to
Landesliga Nord; Landesliga Ost; Landesliga Süd; Landesliga West	Saarland		Verbandsliga Saarland Nordost; Verbandsliga Saarland Südwest	Bezirksliga
Landesklasse Nord; Landesklasse Ost; Landesklasse Süd; Landesklasse West	Brandenburg		Landesliga	Kreisoberliga
Landesklasse 1 Landesklasse 2 Landesklasse 3 Landesklasse 4	Mecklenburg-Western Pomerania		Landesliga	Kreisoberliga
Landesklasse 1 Landesklasse 2 Landesklasse 3 Landesklasse 4 Landesklasse 5 Landesklasse 6 Landesklasse 7	Saxony-Anhalt		Landesliga	Kreisoberliga
