= FC Kilia Kiel =

Association football club in Germany

Coordinates: 54°19′08″N 10°06′05″E

- Full name: Fußballclub Kilia Kiel von 1902 e. V.
- Founded: 1902
- Ground: Kiliaplatz
- Capacity: 6,000
- Chairman: Michael Braun
- Manager: Nicola Soranno
- League: Oberliga Schleswig-Holstein (V)
- 2025–26: Oberliga Schleswig-Holstein, 3rd of 18
- Website: fckilia.de
Home colours	Away colours

FC Kilia Kiel is a German association football club from the city of Kiel, Schleswig-Holstein.

== History ==
The club was formed 23 July 1902 by a group of footballers who had left 1. Kieler Fußballverein von 1900 which plays today as Holstein Kiel. Through the 1920s the club played in the Nordkreisliga where it was competitive enough to earn second-place finishes behind Holstein in 1922, 1923 and 1924. The next season the Kreisliga was split into two sections; the Fördestaffel and the Eiderstaffel, with Holstein playing in the former and Kilia the latter. This did not change the club's fortunes, however, as Kilia was unable to overtake its rival and make it out of regional league play to the national level.

The club played lower-tier football over the next decades until winning promotion in 1941 to the Gauliga Nordmark, one of sixteen top-flight divisions formed in the 1933 re-organization of German football under the Third Reich. The following season this division was also split up to form the Gauliga Hamburg and the Gauliga Schleswig-Holstein – where Kilia again finished second-best to Holstein.

World War II eventually forced the club to join Union Teutonia Kiel to form the war time side (Kriegsspielgemeinshaft) KSG Kilia Kiel/Union Teutonia Kiel. Play in the division became local in character, centered on the cities of Kiel and Lübeck. Conflict overtook the region and therefore league results are unknown for the 1944–45 season.

After the war Kilia resumed play in the second tier Landesliga Schleswig-Holstein where they played through to 1962 without distinguishing themselves. After the formation of the Bundesliga, Germany's first top flight professional league in 1963, and the subsequent re-organization of the lower divisions, Kilia found itself in what was now the third tier Amateurliga Schleswig-Holstein. They took part in promotion playoffs for the Regionalliga Nord (II) at the end of the 1964 season, but were unsuccessful in their bid to move up. By 1966 they had slipped to fourth division play in the 2.Amateurliga Schleswig-Holstein/Ost and Verbandsliga Schleswig-Holstein/Nord until a further descent to the Landesliga Schleswig-Holstein/Nord (V) in 1981.

A first place Landesliga finish in 1984 returned Kilia to the Verbandsliga Schleswig-Holstein for a ten-year span until re-structuring made the league a fifth division circuit. After a single season cameo in the Oberliga Hamburg/Schleswig-Holstein (IV) in 2001–02, Kilia voluntarily returned to the Verbandsliga.

The club dropped to the seventh tier Kreisliga but was promoted back up to the Verbandsliga Schleswig-Holstein-Nord-Ost in 2014 and to the Schleswig-Holstein-Liga in 2015.

The club won the 2022−23 Schleswig-Holstein league and qualified for the play-off, from which it was promoted to the fourth-tier Regionalliga Nord for the 2023−24 season.

== Players ==
=== Current squad ===
As of 1 February 2024

Note: Flags indicate national team as defined under FIFA eligibility rules; some limited exceptions apply. Players may hold more than one non-FIFA nationality.

No.	Pos.	Nation	Player
1	GK	GER	Justus Kaack
3	DF	GER	Serhat Yüksel
4	DF	GER	Malte Petersen
5	MF	GER	Tom Warncke
8	MF	GER	Tom Baller
9	FW	GER	Ben Luca Nohns
10	MF	GER	Julius Alt
11	FW	GER	Jan-Matti Seidel
12	GK	GER	Nikolas Wulf
13	FW	GER	Christopher Kramer
14	MF	GER	Felix Niebergall
15	DF	GER	Florian Foit
16	MF	GER	Jeppe Waschko

No.	Pos.	Nation	Player
17	DF	GER	Berat Ayyıldız
18	MF	GER	Kevin Schulz
19	FW	GER	Luca Aouci
20	MF	TUR	Sercan Yildirimer
22	GK	GER	Finn Kornath
23	MF	GER	Rezan Acer
24	FW	GER	Marvin Müller
25	FW	GER	Drilon Trepca
26	FW	GER	Benjamin Petrick
27	FW	GER	Yannik Jakubowski
29	DF	GER	Kevin Harder
33	DF	GER	Salih Ramo
41	GK	GER	Tom Pachulski

== Honours ==
The club's honours:

- Oberliga Schleswig-Holstein (V): 2023, 2025
- Landesliga Schleswig-Holstein-Mitte (VI): 2021
- Verbandsliga Schleswig-Holstein-Ost (VII): 2015, 2020
- Schleswig-Holstein Cup: 1990, 1993
