= TSV Altenholz =

German football club

- Full name: Turn- und Sportverein Altenholz von 1948 e.V.
- Founded: 1948
- League: Landesliga Schleswig (VI)
- 2018–19: 13th
- Website: http://www.tsv-altenholz-fussball.de
Home colours	Away colours

TSV Altenholz is a German football club from the city of Altenholz, Schleswig-Holstein.

== History ==
The club was established as the gymnastics club Turn- und Sportverein Altenholz on 1 May 1948 and did not form a football department until nearly two decades later on 29 June 1966. The footballers briefly went their own way as Verein für Leibesübungen Altenholz in late 1966 but were reunited with their parent club that same year.

In 1997 the football side advanced to the Oberliga Hamburg/Schleswig-Holstein (IV) and in anticipation of joining professional upper-tier play again became independent of the parent club as TSV Altenholz Fußball GmBH & Co. KG in order to protect it from any future financial risk. They played four seasons under this status at the Oberliga level with their best result coming as a third-place finish in 2000. The legal separation between the two entities was later undone in 2001. The club voluntarily withdrew to the Bezirksoberliga (VI) at the conclusion of their 2002–03 campaign despite finishing outside of the relegation zone in 12th place. TSV advanced to play in the Verbandsliga (V) and qualified in 2008 for the Schleswig-Holstein-Liga (V) following the reorganization of Germany's league structure and the introduction of the new 3. Liga, later becoming an inaugural member of the new Landesliga Schleswig (VI) in 2017.

== Honours ==
The club's honours:

- Verbandsliga Schleswig-Holstein: 1997
- Verbandsliga Schleswig-Holstein-Nord-Ost: 2012
- Bezirksoberliga Kiel (VI): 2006
- Bezirksliga Kiel (VI): 1992
- Kreis Altenholz (VII): 1991
