= Kreisliga =

- Country: Germany
- Level on pyramid: Step 8 to 13
- Current: 2026–27

The Kreisliga (English: District League), along with the Kreisoberliga (English: District Premier League) and the Kreisklasse (English: District Class), are the lowest set of divisions in the German football league system, set at step 8 and below.

== Structure ==
Whereas the top amateur divisions are organised by the 21 state football associations of the German Football Association, the bottom divisions fall under the jurisdiction of their subsidiary bodies, being more than 400 district football associations that organise their divisions mostly following the borders of the corresponding policial districts. Therefore, in the league pyramid, the Kreisliga ranks below the superior state association's divisions, typically being the Verbandsliga, the Landesliga and depending on the state association's structure also the Bezirksliga.

The Kreisliga exists within all associations in varying numbers and form. There are usually multiple levels of Kreisliga, distinguished by the suffix A, B, C or D. Some district associations also run a Kreisklasse below then Kreisliga, the Kreisklasse then distinguished by the prefix 1st, 2nd and 3rd. Several associations also run a Kreisoberliga (English: District Premier League) as their top flight above the Kreisliga or Kreisklasse.

== Overview by state association ==
State association	Step 8	Step 9	Step 10	Step 11	Step 12	Step 13
Baden	Kreisliga	Kreisklasse A	Kreisklasse B	Kreisklasse C		
Bavaria	Kreisliga	Kreisklasse	A-Klasse	B-Klasse	C-Klasse	
Berlin		Kreisliga A	Kreisliga B	Kreisliga C	Kreisklasse A	Kreisklasse B
Brandenburg		Kreisoberliga	Kreisliga	1. Kreisklasse	2. Kreisklasse	
Bremen	1. Kreisliga	2. Kreisliga	3. Kreisliga	1. Kreisklasse	2. Kreisklasse	
Hamburg	Kreisliga	Kreisklasse	Kreisklasse B			
Hesse	Kreisoberliga	Kreisliga A	Kreisliga B	Kreisliga C	Kreisliga D	
Lower Rhine	Kreisliga A	Kreisliga B	Kreisliga C	Kreisliga D		
Lower Saxony	Kreisliga	1. Kreisklasse	2. Kreisklasse	3. Kreisklasse	4. Kreisklasse	5. Kreisklasse
Mecklenburg-Western Pomerania		Kreisoberliga	Kreisliga	1. Kreisklasse		
Middle Rhine	Kreisliga A	Kreisliga B	Kreisliga C	Kreisliga D		
Rhineland	Kreisliga A	Kreisliga B	Kreisliga C	Kreisliga D		
Saarland			Kreisliga A	Kreisliga B		
Saxony	Kreisoberliga	1. Kreisliga	2. Kreisliga/1. Klasse	3. Kreisliga/2. Klasse	1. or 2. Kreisklasse	
Saxony-Anhalt		Kreisoberliga	Kreisliga	1. Kreisklasse	2. Kreisklasse	
Schleswig-Holstein	Kreisliga	Kreisklasse A	Kreisklasse B	Kreisklasse C		
South Baden		1. Kreisliga	2. Kreisliga	3. Kreisliga		
Southwest		A-Klasse	B-Klasse	C-Klasse	D-Klasse	
Thuringia	Kreisoberliga	Kreisliga	1. Kreisklasse	2. Kreisklasse		
Westphalia		Kreisliga A	Kreisliga B	Kreisliga C	Kreisliga D	
Württemberg		Kreisliga A	Kreisliga B	Kreisliga C		
