= Landesliga Schleswig-Holstein =

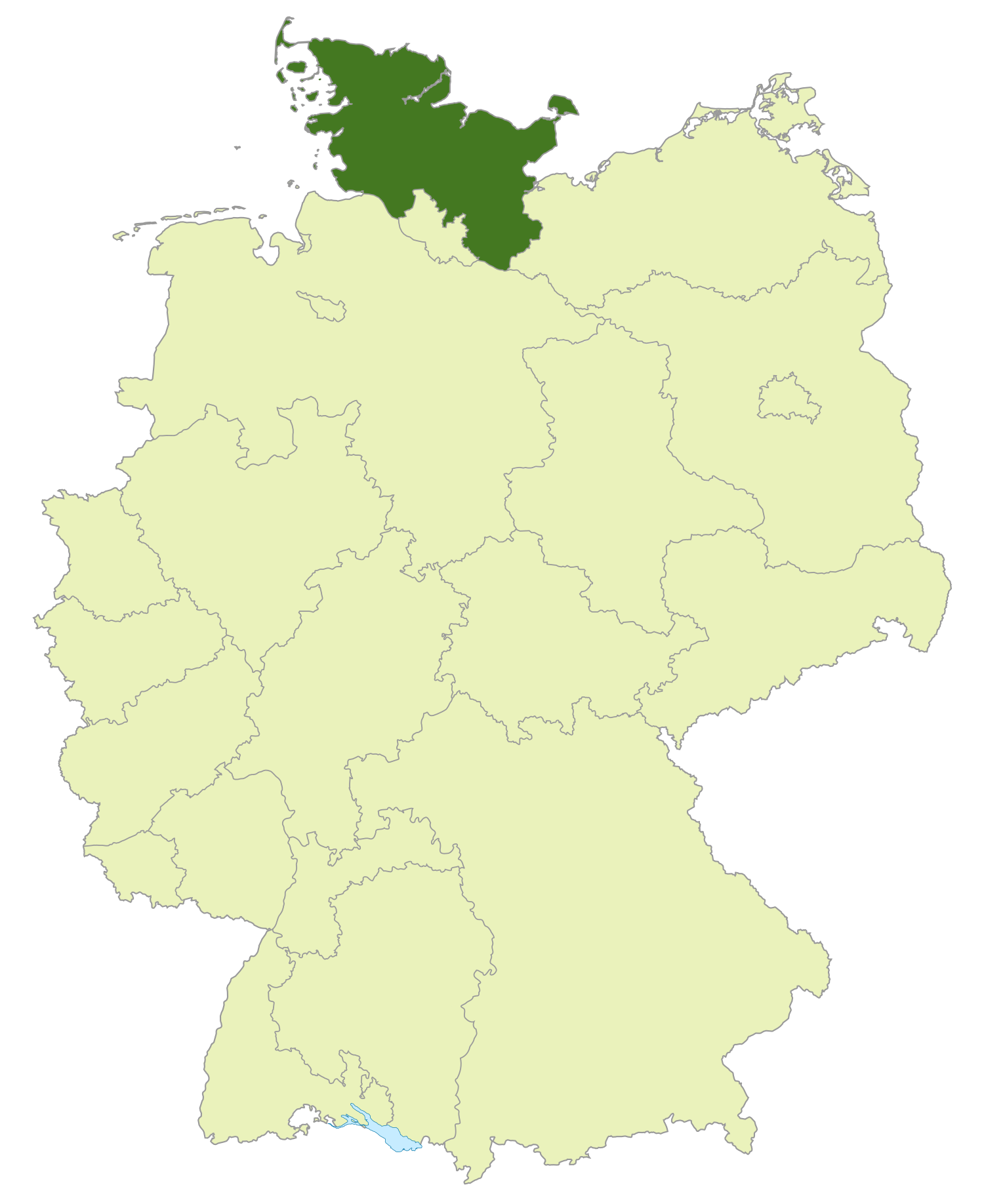
- Founded: 2017
- Country: Germany
- State: Schleswig-Holstein
- Divisions: 3
- Number of clubs: 35
- Level on pyramid: Level 6
- Promotion to: Oberliga Schleswig-Holstein
- Relegation to: Verbandsliga Nord; Verbandsliga Ost; Verbandsliga Süd; Verbandsliga West
- Current champions: Schleswig: Husumer SV; Holstein: SV Eichede II; Mitte: FC Kilia Kiel (2021–22)

The Landesliga Schleswig-Holstein is the sixth tier of the German football league system and the second-highest league in the German state of Schleswig-Holstein, supplanting the Verbandsligen at that level in the state.

== Overview ==
The Landesliga was relaunched to start play in the 2017–18 season as part of realignments in the league system of Schleswig-Holstein and as a solution to the problem of many teams promoted to the Verbandsliga ending up relegated or withdrawn after one season.

The league is divided into two divisions of 16 clubs each, Schleswig (north-west) and Holstein (south-east), and teams promoted to or relegated from it will be assigned to a division based on geographical proximity, a practice called "flexible game operation" (German: flexibler Spielbetrieb).

For 2020–21 and 2021–22, the Landesliga was expanded to three groups, each having 11 to 12 teams for a total of 34–35 after the previous 2019–20 season was curtailed.

== Founding members of the Landesliga ==
The league was newly reformed from the following clubs that have played in the following leagues in 2016–17:

- From the Schleswig-Holstein-Liga:
  - TuS Hartenholm, 13th
  - TSV Kropp, 14th
  - Oldenburger SV, 15th
  - TSV Altenholz, 16th
  - TSG Concordia Schönkirchen, 17th
  - FC Kilia Kiel, 18th
- From the Verbandsliga Nord-Ost:
  - Gettorfer SC, 2nd
  - TSV Bordesholm, 3rd
  - Osterrönfelder TSV, 4th
  - Büdelsdorfer TSV, 5th
  - Heikendorfer SV, 6th
  - Eckernförder SV, 7th
- From the Verbandsliga Nord-West:
  - Husumer SV, 2nd
  - BSC Brunsbüttel, 3rd
  - Schleswig 06, 4th
  - TSV Rantrum, 5th
  - Blau-Weiß Löwenstedt, 6th
  - SG Geest 05, 7th
- From the Verbandsliga Süd-Ost:
  - VfB Lübeck II, 2nd
  - Grün-Weiß Siebenbäumen, 3rd
  - SV Preußen Reinfeld, 4th
  - 1. FC Phönix Lübeck, 5th
  - SV Eichede II, 6th
  - TSV Travemünde, 7th
- From the Verbandsliga Süd-West:
  - SSC Phönix Kisdorf, 2nd
  - FC Reher/Puls, 3rd
  - VfR Horst, 4th
  - VfR Kellinghausen, 5th
  - SV Schakendorf, 6th
  - SV Todesfelde II, 7th
- From the promotion round:
  - TSV Klausdorf, Nord-Ost, 8th
  - TSV Pansdorf, Süd-Ost, 8th

== Champions ==
Season	Schleswig	Holstein
2017–18	TSV Kropp	VfB Lübeck II
2018–19	Husumer SV	Oldenburger SV
2019–20	TSV Altenholz	TSV Pansdorf

Season	Schleswig	Holstein	Mitte
2020–21	Season curtailed and annulled		
2021–22	Husumer SV	SV Eichede II	FC Kilia Kiel

- In 2020, the division champions were determined by points-per-game average after the season was terminated in May due to the coronavirus disease pandemic in Germany. TSV Kronshagen (Schleswig) and FC Dornbreite Lübeck (Holstein) were also promoted as runners-up.
