= VfR Neumünster =

German football club

- Full name: Verein für Rasensport Neumünster von 1910 e.V.
- Founded: 1910
- Ground: Grümmi-Arena
- Capacity: 10,000
- Chairman: Gerd Grümmer
- Manager: Rocco Leeser
- League: Oberliga Schleswig-Holstein (V)
- 2025–26: Oberliga Schleswig-Holstein, 5th of 18
- Website: http://www.vfr-nms.de/
Home colours	Away colours

VfR Neumünster is a German association football club based in Neumünster, Schleswig-Holstein. The club was established on 3 March 1910 as FV Neumünster by members of FC Germania 1907 Neumünster and FC Viktoria 1909 Neumünster. In 1924, FV was joined by VfR 1923 Neumünster – which was the football department of TV Gut-Heil Neumünster – to form the present day club.

== History ==
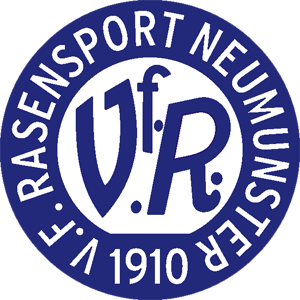
Historical logo of VfR Neumünster ca. 1931.

VfR enjoyed only modest success in its early years, taking part in second division competition for a single season in 1937–38. They advanced to the first division Oberliga Nord in 1955, with their best result coming as a third-place finish there in 1959. After the formation of the Bundesliga, Germany's first top flight professional league, in 1963, VfR found itself in the second division Regionalliga, but quickly slipped from the professional ranks. During the late 50s and early 60s, until the formation of the Bundesliga, the club's amateur side played second-division football in the Amateurliga Schleswig-Holstein.

In the mid-90s the team returned to the Oberliga Nord (IV) and finished as vice-champions in 2002–03. That earned the club a place in the promotion playoffs for the Regionalliga Nord where they beat Kickers Emden to move up. Their third division adventure lasted only a single season and they were promptly relegated after an 18th-place finish. This was followed by financial problems leading to bankruptcy proceedings in 2005. VfR briefly recovered itself but was forced back into bankruptcy in 2007. The club has since recovered, winning promotion back to the Regionalliga Nord in 2012 but being relegated in 2015.

== Stadium ==
The club plays its home fixtures in the Grümmi-Arena (former known as VfR-Stadion an der Geerdtsstraße) built in 1927 and having a current capacity of 10,000.

== Honours ==
The club's honours:

- Oberliga Hamburg/Schleswig-Holstein (IV): 2003
- Schleswig-Holstein-Liga (II/III/IV/V): 1953, 1966, 1976, 1980, 2000, 2011, 2012
- Schleswig-Holstein Cup (Tiers III-V): 1974, 2004, 2013
