= Bezirksoberliga =

- Founded: 1988
- Folded: 2012
- Country: Germany
- Level on pyramid: Level 7

The Bezirksoberliga (English: Football County Premier League) was the seventh tier of the German football league system in the state of Bavaria from 1988 to 2012. The Bezirksoberligas also existed in other states of Germany, like Hesse and Lower Saxony. In Hesse, they were renamed to Gruppenligas, in Lower Saxony to Landesligas. At the end of the 2011–12 season, Bavaria abolished its Bezirksoberligas, too, leaving Germany without such a league in senior men's football unless another federation would opt to rename or introduce a league.

== Overview ==
=== In Niedersachsen ===
With the introduction of the 3. Liga and the disbanding of the Oberliga Nord in 2008, the two Verbandsligas in Niedersachsen became the highest amateur leagues for the state. Accordingly, the two leagues were renamed to Oberliga, their new names being:

- Oberliga Niedersachsen-Ost
- Oberliga Niedersachsen-West

Below the two former Verbandsligas, the four existing Bezirksoberligas now became the sixth tier of the league system. On 17 May 2010, the Lower Saxony football association decided to rename the four Bezirksoberligas to Landesligas from the 1 July 2010. This change in name came alongside the merger of the two Oberliga divisions above it into the Niedersachsenliga.

=== In Bavaria ===
In the state of Bavaria, seven Bezirksoberligas were introduced in 1988, each covering one of the seven Regierungsbezirke:

- Bezirksoberliga Schwaben
- Bezirksoberliga Oberbayern
- Bezirksoberliga Niederbayern
- Bezirksoberliga Oberpfalz
- Bezirksoberliga Mittelfranken
- Bezirksoberliga Unterfranken
- Bezirksoberliga Oberfranken

These seven leagues formed the seventh tier of the German league system in Bavaria, below the three Bavarian Landesligas. The leagues were abolished at the end of the 2011–12 season.

=== In Hesse ===
In the state of Hesse, the previously existing Bezirksoberligas were renamed to Gruppenligas at the end of the 2007–08 season.

=== In Schleswig-Holstein ===
In the state of Schleswig-Holstein, the Landesligas were renamed to Bezirksoberligas in 1999. In 2008, the Bezirksoberligas were then renamed to Verbandsligas. Currently, there are no Bezirksoberligas in the state any more.
