= Oberliga Schleswig-Holstein =

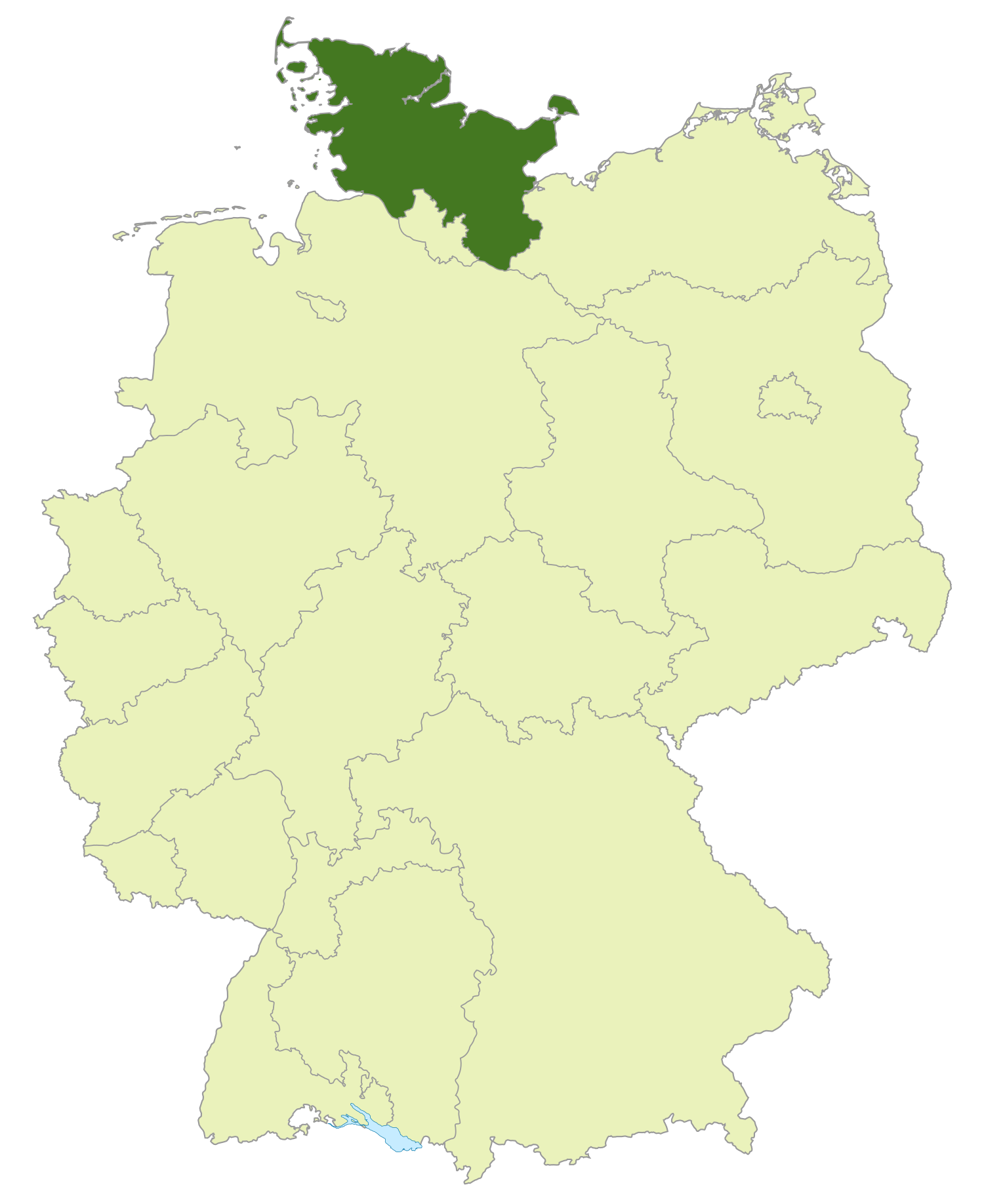
- Founded: 1947
- Country: Germany
- State: Schleswig-Holstein
- Number of clubs: 16
- Level on pyramid: Level 5
- Promotion to: Regionalliga Nord
- Relegation to: Landesliga Schleswig-Holstein
- Current champions: SV Todesfelde (2025–26)
- Current: 2026-27 Oberliga Schleswig-Holstein

The Oberliga Schleswig-Holstein, formerly referred to as Schleswig-Holstein-Liga, is the fifth tier of the German football league system and the highest league in the German state of Schleswig-Holstein. It is one of fourteen Oberligas in German football.

== Overview ==
=== 1945–1963 ===
The league was formed in 1947 as Schleswig-Holstein-Liga by thirty clubs in three divisions of ten, in the newly created state of Schleswig-Holstein which was then part of the British occupation zone in Germany. On 30 August 1947, the Schleswig-Holstein FA (SHFV) was formed.

From the start, the league was a feeder league to the Oberliga Nord which its champion had the option of promotion to. Promotion had to be achieved through a play-off with teams from the Amateurligen of Lower Saxony, Bremen and Hamburg. As such, the league was now the second tier of the northern German league system. The league was renamed Landesliga Schleswig-Holstein (English:Schleswig-Holstein State League) in 1948 and united in one division of twelve teams, with the bottom two teams relegated to one of the four Bezirksklassen.

In 1951, the league was expanded to sixteen teams. The number of clubs in the league fluctuated to eighteen in 1954-55, seventeen in 1955–56 and then returned to sixteen again.

From 1954, the league was renamed Amateurliga Schleswig-Holstein.

=== 1963–1974 ===
In 1963, with the introduction of the Bundesliga, the disbanding of the Oberliga Nord and the formation of the Regionalliga Nord, the league fell to tier three, but remained unchanged otherwise, with sixteen clubs as its strength. The champion of Schleswig-Holstein continued to have to play-off for promotion, now to the Regionalliga.

From 1968, the Amateurliga reverted to the name Landesliga Schleswig-Holstein. Below the Landesliga, the number of leagues was reduced from four to two, the new Verbandsligen of Schleswig-Holstein-Nord and -Süd.

=== 1974–1994 ===
After the 1973–74 season, the Regionalliga Nord was disbanded in favor of the 2nd Bundesliga Nord. The new Oberliga Nord was now introduced in northern Germany, as the third tier of the league system, below the 2nd Bundesliga. This meant for the Landesliga a slip to tier four. The top two team of the league was however promoted to the new Oberliga. The system for promotion from the Landesliga remained mostly unchanged.

In 1978, the league was finally renamed Verbandsliga Schleswig-Holstein, the name it carried until 2008. It took ten seasons for a club of the league under the new name to gain promotion again, a long stretch of nine seasons without success. Below the Verbandsliga the two leagues were now renamed Landesligen instead.

=== 1994–2008 ===
In 1994, the Regionalliga Nord was re-established, now as the third tier of the league system. The Oberliga Nord was in turn replaced by two parallel Oberligen, Niedersachsen/Bremen and Hamburg/Schleswig-Holstein. For the Verbandsliga Schleswig-Holstein, this meant a further slip, now to tier five, but also, for the first time in its history, direct promotion for the league champion and, in some seasons, even the runners-up. In 1994, the league saw its top eight clubs elevated to the new Oberliga.

From 1999, the number of leagues below the Verbandsliga was extended from two to four and the leagues renamed Bezirksoberliga.

The 1999-2000 season saw another league system change with the reduction of numbers of Regionalligen, this however had no effect on the Verbandsliga.

In 2004, it was decided to restore the Oberliga Nord in favor of the two separate Oberligen.

The league was expanded, for the first time, to eighteen teams, for the next three seasons. In 2007-08, the number increased to nineteen. The 2006-07 league winner, TSV Kropp, did not apply for an Oberliga licence and was not promoted. Fifth placed FC Kilia Kiel applied but was refused a licence.

=== 2008 onwards ===
At the end of the 2007–08 season, the new 3rd Liga was established and the Oberliga Nord disbanded, again. The four northern German states were then the only regions without an Oberliga and the five Verbandsligen sit right below the Regionalliga Nord, parallel to the two NOFV-Oberligen. At the end of the 2007-08 season, the five winners of the northern Verbandsligen played with the sixth placed team from the Oberliga Nord for one last spot in the Regionalliga. In the future seasons, promotion for the Schleswig-Holstein champion will only be available through a set of play-off matches with the league winners from Hamburg and Bremen. These three teams will compete for one promotion spot to the Regionalliga.

The Schleswig-Holstein-Liga however maintained its status as a tier five league. This fact means the league is now on the same level as other Oberligas in Germany. Accordingly, the league dropped the name Verbandsliga and simply called itself Schleswig-Holstein-Liga. The leagues below it then adopted the name Verbandsliga. Since the 2017-18 season, the league is known as Oberliga Schleswig-Holstein and relegates to the newly created Landesliga Schleswig-Holstein in the sixth tier.

In April 2020, the SHFV curtailed the remainder of the 2019–20 season during the coronavirus disease 2019 (COVID-19) pandemic in Germany and determined the final standings using points-per-game averages. It was decided in May to suspended relegation for one season to expand the league. The Oberliga was split into two 9-team groups for the 2020–21 season that was later abandoned because of the pandemic, with no promotions or relegations.

== Position of the Oberliga Schleswig-Holstein in the league system ==
| Years | Tier | Promotion to |
|---|---|---|
| 1947–1963 | II | Oberliga Nord |
| 1963–1974 | III | Regionalliga Nord |
| 1974–1994 | IV | Oberliga Nord |
| 1994–2004 | V | Oberliga Hamburg/Schleswig-Holstein |
| 2004–2008 | V | Oberliga Nord |
| 2008– | V | Regionalliga Nord |

== Winners of the Oberliga Schleswig-Holstein ==
The league champions:

| Season | Club |
|---|---|
| 1947–48 | Itzehoer SV |
| 1948–49 | Itzehoer SV |
| 1949–50 | **Itzehoer SV** |
| 1950–51 | VfB Lübeck |
| 1951–52 | **VfB Lübeck** |
| 1952–53 | **VfR Neumünster** |
| 1953–54 | Itzehoer SV |
| 1954–55 | VfB Lübeck |
| 1955–56 | **Heider SV** |
| 1956–57 | **VfB Lübeck** |
| 1957–58 | Heider SV |
| 1958–59 | Heider SV |
| 1959–60 | Heider SV |
| 1960–61 | Holstein Kiel II |
| 1961–62 | Heider SV |
| 1962–63 | Heider SV |
| 1963–64 | VfL Bad Oldesloe |
| 1964–65 | **Itzehoer SV** |
| 1965–66 | VfR Neumünster |
| 1966–67 | **Phönix Lübeck** |
| 1967–68 | SV Friedrichsort |
| 1968–69 | VfB Kiel |
| 1969–70 | SV Friedrichsort |
| 1970–71 | Rendsburger TSV |
| 1971–72 | Rendsburger TSV |
| 1972–73 | SpVgg Flensburg 08 |

| Season | Club |
|---|---|
| 1973–74 | **SpVgg Flensburg 08** |
| 1974–75 | VfB Lübeck |
| 1975–76 | VfR Neumünster |
| 1976–77 | **VfB Lübeck** |
| 1977–78 | **Phönix Lübeck** |
| 1978–79 | NTSV Strand 08 |
| 1979–80 | VfR Neumünster |
| 1980–81 | Eutin 08 |
| 1981–82 | Blau-Weiß Friedrichstadt |
| 1982–83 | Heider SV |
| 1983–84 | NTSV Strand 08 |
| 1984–85 | Itzehoer SV |
| 1985–86 | Itzehoer SV |
| 1986–87 | VfB Lübeck |
| 1987–88 | **TuS Hoisdorf** |
| 1988–89 | VfB Lübeck |
| 1989–90 | VfB Lübeck |
| 1990–91 | VfB Kiel |
| 1991–92 | VfB Lübeck |
| 1992–93 | **VfB Lübeck** |
| 1993–94 | **Holstein Kiel II** |
| 1994–95 | **TSV Nord Harrislee** |
| 1995–96 | **TSB Flensburg** |
| 1996–97 | **TSV Altenholz** |
| 1997–98 | **TuS Felde** |
| 1998–99 | **Eichholzer SV** |

| Season | Club |
|---|---|
| 1999–00 | **VfR Neumünster** |
| 2000–01 | **Husumer SV** |
| 2001–02 | **Holstein Kiel II** |
| 2002–03 | **FT Eider Büdelsdorf** |
| 2003–04 | **VfB Lübeck II** |
| 2004–05 | Itzehoer SV |
| 2005–06 | **SV Henstedt-Rhen** |
| 2006–07 | TSV Kropp |
| 2007–08 | Holstein Kiel II |
| 2008–09 | Holstein Kiel II |
| 2009–10 | Holstein Kiel II |
| 2010–11 | VfR Neumünster |
| 2011–12 | **VfR Neumünster** |
| 2012–13 | **SV Eichede** |
| 2013–14 | **VfB Lübeck** |
| 2014–15 | **TSV Schilksee** |
| 2015–16 | SV Eichede |
| 2016–17 | **Eutin 08** |
| 2017–18 | NTSV Strand 08 |
| 2018–19 | NTSV Strand 08 |
| 2019–20 | SV Todesfelde |
| 2020–21 | None |
| 2021–22 | SV Todesfelde |
| 2022–23 | **Kilia Kiel** |
| 2023–24 | **SV Todesfelde** |
| 2024–25 | Kilia Kiel |
| 2025–26 | **SV Todesfelde** |

- **bold** denotes club gained promotion.
- In 1957, the runner-up Phönix Lübeck was also promoted
- In 1959, the runner-up VfB Lübeck was promoted instead
- In 1962, the runner-up VfB Lübeck was promoted instead
- In 1963, the runner-up SV Friedrichsort was promoted instead
- In 1968 and 1970, the runner-up Heider SV was promoted instead
- In 1990, the runner-up Eutin 08 was promoted instead
- In 1994, the top eight clubs were promoted to the new Oberliga Hamburg/Schleswig-Holstein
- In 1995, the runner-up VfR Neumünster was also promoted
- In 1998, the runner-up Phönix Lübeck was also promoted
- In 1999, the runner-up TSV Lägerdorf was also promoted
- In 2001, the second- and third-placed teams, SpVgg Flensburg 08 and FC Kilia Kiel were also promoted
- In 2002, the runner-up TSB Flensburg was also promoted
- In 2003, the runner-up TSV Kropp was also promoted
- In 2005, the runner-up TSV Kropp was promoted instead
- In 2012, the runner-up ETSV Weiche was also promoted
- In 2018, the third-placed Holstein Kiel II was promoted instead
- In 2019, the fourth-placed Heider SV was promoted instead
- In 2020, the runner-up Phönix Lübeck was promoted instead
- In 2021, no club was promoted due to the curtailment and annulment of the paused season during the COVID-19 pandemic; Husumer SV later resigned from the Oberliga
- In 2025, the runner-up Heider SV was promoted instead

=== Founding members of the Oberiga Schleswig-Holstein ===
==== Northern Group ====
- Eckernförder SV, qualified for the new Landesliga
- SpVgg Flensburg 08, qualified for the new Landesliga
- Husumer SV, qualified for the new Landesliga
- ATSV Flensburg, qualified for the new Landesliga
- Schleswig 06
- VfB Kiel
- VfR Laboe
- Rot-Weiß Niebüll
- Schwarz-Weiß Elmschenhagen
- SC Comet Kiel

==== Eastern Group ====
- FC Kilia Kiel, qualified for the new Landesliga
- Phönix Lübeck, qualified for the new Landesliga
- Eutin 08, qualified for the new Landesliga
- Polizei SV Kiel, qualified for the new Landesliga
- TSV Schlutup
- TSV Kücknitz
- TSV Mölln
- VfL Oldesloe
- Preetzer TSV
- Oldenburger SV

==== Western Group ====
- Itzehoer SV, qualified for the new Landesliga
- Fortuna Glückstadt, qualified for the new Landesliga
- Union Neumünster, qualified for the new Landesliga
- TSV Brunsbüttelkoog, qualified for the new Landesliga
- Gut-Heil Neumünster
- Heider SV
- Rendsburger TSV
- VfR Neumünster
- TuS Nortorf
- VfL Kellinghusen

== League placings ==
The complete list of clubs and placings in the league since elevation to Oberliga status (2008–present):

| Club | 09 | 10 | 11 | 12 | 13 | 14 | 15 | 16 | 17 | 18 | 19 | 20 | 21 | 22 | 23 | 24 | 25 |
|---|---|---|---|---|---|---|---|---|---|---|---|---|---|---|---|---|---|
| VfB Lübeck | R | R | R | R | R | 1 | R | R | R | R | R | R | 3L | R | R | 3L | R |
| SC Weiche Flensburg 08^{1} | | 9 | 6 | 2 | R | R | R | R | R | R | R | R | R | R | R | R | R |
| Holstein Kiel II | 1 | 1 | 7 | 3 | 2 | 4 | 2 | 3 | 2 | 3 | R | R | R | R | R | R | R |
| 1. FC Phönix Lübeck | | | | | | | | | | | | 2 | R | R | R | R | R |
| SV Todesfelde | | | 13 | 11 | 5 | 8 | 5 | 5 | 9 | 6 | 3 | 1 | 3 | 1 | 3 | 1 | R |
| FC Kilia Kiel | 17 | | | | | | | 13 | 18 | | | | | | 1 | R | 1 |
| Heider SV | 4 | 10 | 14 | 13 | 7 | 10 | 14 | 6 | 7 | 7 | 4 | R | R | R | 6 | 5 | 2 |
| Union Neumünster | | 14 | 15 | | | 3 | 12 | 11 | 12 | 13 | 11 | 10 | 8 | 9 | 4 | 3 | 3 |
| SV Eichede | | 3 | 2 | 4 | 1 | R | 3 | 1 | R | 5 | 7 | 5 | 1 | 2 | 2 | 2 | 4 |
| TSV Nordmark Satrup | | | | | | | | | | | | | | | | 8 | 5 |
| SV Preußen Reinfeld | | | | | | | | | | | | 9 | 13 | 14 | | 7 | 6 |
| MTSV Hohenwestedt | | | | | | | | | | | | | | | | 13 | 7 |
| Oldenburger SV | | | | | | | | 12 | 15 | | | 7 | 5 | 5 | 11 | 10 | 8 |
| Eutiner SV 1908 | | | | | | | | | | | | | | | | | 9 |
| TuS Rotenhof | | | | | | | | | | | | | | | | | 10 |
| VfR Neumünster | 2 | 2 | 1 | 1 | R | R | R | 10 | 3 | 11 | 14 | | | | | 9 | 11 |
| VfB Lübeck II | 8 | 6 | 4 | 5 | 12 | | | | | | 6 | 6 | 11 | 12 | 8 | 11 | 12 |
| Eckernförder SV | 12 | 7 | 17 | | | | | | | | | 16 | 15 | 3 | 7 | 6 | 13 |
| TSB Flensburg | | | | | | | | 4 | 4 | 2 | 2 | 4 | 4 | 4 | 5 | 4 | 14 |
| Eidertal Molfsee | | | | | | | | | | | | | | | | | 15 |
| FC Dornbreite Lübeck | | | | | 9 | 14 | 16 | | | 14 | | | 14 | 11 | 13 | 12 | 16 |
| Inter Türkspor Kiel | | | | | | | | | | 8 | 10 | 14 | 18 | 8 | 9 | 14 | |
| TSV Bordesholm | | | 16 | | | | 17 | | | | 8 | 8 | 2 | 6 | 10 | 15 | |
| SC Weiche Flensburg 08 II | | | | | | | | | | 4 | 5 | 3 | 6 | 10 | 12 | 16 | |
| SV Frisia Risum-Lindholm | | | | | | | | | 11 | 10 | 13 | 11 | 9 | 13 | 14 | | |
| TSV Pansdorf | | | | | | | | | | | | | 12 | 7 | 15 | | |
| Husumer SV | 16 | | | 16 | | 15 | | | | | | 12 | 17 | | 16 | | |
| SV Grün-Weiß Siebenbäumen | | | | | | | | | | | | | | | 17 | | |
| TSV Altenholz | 14 | 17 | | | 10 | 5 | 8 | 9 | 16 | | | | 7 | 15 | | | |
| Eutin 08 | | | | | | | 4 | 2 | 1 | R | 9 | 13 | 16 | 16 | | | |
| TSV Kronshagen | | | | | | | | | | | | | 10 | 17 | | | |
| TSV Kropp | 13 | 12 | 8 | 6 | 4 | 6 | 6 | 8 | 14 | | 12 | 15 | | | | | |
| NTSV Strand 08 | 18 | | 5 | 7 | 8 | 12 | 15 | | 6 | 1 | 1 | | | | | | |
| TSV Lägerdorf | | | | | | | | | 10 | 9 | 15 | | | | | | |
| TSV Schilksee | | | | | | 11 | 1 | R | 8 | 12 | 16 | | | | | | |
| TSV Friedrichsberg-Busdorf | | | | | | | | | | 15 | | | | | | | |
| TSV Wankendorf | | | | | | | | | | 16 | | | | | | | |
| SpVgg Flensburg 08 | 10 | 8 | 10 | 8 | 3 | 7 | 9 | 7 | 5 | | | | | | | | |
| TuS Hartenholm | | | | | 15 | 13 | 11 | 14 | 13 | | | | | | | | |
| TSG Concordia Schönkirchen | | | | | | | | | 17 | | | | | | | | |
| Preetzer TSV | | | | 10 | 6 | 2 | 7 | 15 | | | | | | | | | |
| SV Henstedt-Ulzburg | 3 | 5 | 9 | 12 | 16 | | 10 | 16 | | | | | | | | | |
| TuRa Meldorf | | | | | 14 | 9 | 13 | 17 | | | | | | | | | |
| FC Reher/Puls | | | | | | | | 18 | | | | | | | | | |
| FC Angeln 02 | | | | | | | 18 | | | | | | | | | | |
| SSC Hagen Ahrensburg | | | | | 13 | 16 | | | | | | | | | | | |
| SV Eichede II | | | | | | 17 | | | | | | | | | | | |
| Heikendorfer SV | 7 | 11 | 11 | 14 | 11 | 18 | | | | | | | | | | | |
| 1. Schleswiger SV 06 | 9 | 13 | 18 | | 17 | | | | | | | | | | | | |
| FC Sylt | | | 3 | 9 | 18 | | | | | | | | | | | | |
| Eider Büdelsdorf | 5 | 4 | 12 | 15 | | | | | | | | | | | | | |
| SV Schackendorf | | | | 17 | | | | | | | | | | | | | |
| Breitenfelder SV | | | | 18 | | | | | | | | | | | | | |
| TSV Klausdorf | | 15 | | | | | | | | | | | | | | | |
| SC Comet Kiel | 6 | 16 | | | | | | | | | | | | | | | |
| Itzehoer SV | 11 | 18 | | | | | | | | | | | | | | | |
| VfR Horst | 15 | | | | | | | | | | | | | | | | |

^{1} Previously known as ETSV Weiche.

=== Key ===
| Symbol | Key |
|---|---|
| B | Bundesliga |
| 2B | 2. Bundesliga |
| 3L | 3. Liga |
| R | Regionalliga Nord |
| 1 | League champions |
| Place | League |
| Blank | Played at a league level below this league |
