= 2016–17 Niedersachsenliga =

- Season: 2016–17
- Champions: SSV Jeddeloh
- Promoted: SSV Jeddeloh
- Relegated: VfL Osnabrück II (retired); FT Braunschweig; Hannoverscher SC; Blau-Weiß Bornreihe
- Matches: 240
- Goals: 768 (3.2 per match)
- Top goalscorer: Sascha Wald (20)

The 2016–17 season of the Niedersachsenliga is the ninth season of the league at tier five (V) in the German football league system and the 27th overall.

== 2016–17 standings ==
The 2016–17 season saw five new clubs in the league, MTV Gifhorn, Hannoverscher SC, Blau-Weiß Bornreihe and TuS Bersenbrück, all four promoted from the Landesligas, while BV Cloppenburg was relegated from the Regionalliga Nord.

Pos	Team	Pld	W	D	L	GF	GA	GD	Pts	Promotion, qualification or relegation
1	SSV Jeddeloh (C, P)	30	22	2	6	72	44	+28	68	Promotion to Regionalliga Nord
2	Eintracht Northeim	30	18	6	6	67	37	+30	60	Qualification to promotion playoffs
3	SC Spelle-Venhaus	30	16	8	6	70	36	+34	56	
4	VfL Osnabrück II (Note: VfL Osnabrück II was retired at the end of the season.) (X)	30	14	8	8	39	28	+11	50	Withdrawal
5	1. FC Wunstorf	30	13	7	10	46	45	+1	46	
6	Heeslinger SC	30	13	5	12	45	49	−4	44	
7	MTV Gifhorn	30	13	3	14	35	43	−8	42	
8	TuS Bersenbrück	30	11	7	12	56	64	−8	40	
9	VfL Oldenburg	30	10	9	11	47	41	+6	39	
10	BV Cloppenburg	30	8	13	9	46	37	+9	37	
11	Arminia Hannover	30	10	7	13	47	44	+3	37	
12	SVG Göttingen	30	9	6	15	46	53	−7	33	
13	TB Uphusen	30	8	9	13	36	50	−14	33	
14	FT Braunschweig (R)	30	8	8	14	52	54	−2	32	Relegation to Landesliga
15	Hannoverscher SC (R)	30	9	4	17	41	66	−25	31	Relegation to Landesliga
16	Blau-Weiß Bornreihe (R)	30	5	4	21	41	95	−54	19	Relegation to Landesliga

Source: soccerway.com
Rules for classification: 1) Points; 2) Goal difference; 3) Goals scored; 4) head-to-head results; 5) goals scored away from home against opponent; 6) goals scored away from home; 7) drawing of lots
(C) Champions; (P) Promoted; (R) Relegated; (X) Withdrawal

=== Top goalscorers ===
The top goal scorers for the season:

Rank	Player	Club	Goals
1	(Germany) Sascha Wald	SC Spelle-Venhaus	20
2	(Germany) Keven Oltmer	SSV Jeddeloh	19
3	(Romania) Emil Gabriel Jula	TuS Bersenbrück	17
4	(Germany) Mehdi Mohebieh	Eintracht Northeim	16
5	(Germany) Torben Poppe	Blau-Weiß Bronreihe	15

== Promotion play-off ==
Promotion play-off were to be held at the end of the season to the Regionalliga Nord. The runners-up of the Niedersachsenliga and the champions or, in Hamburg's case, the best-placed team applying for a licence, of the Bremen-Liga, Oberliga Hamburg and Schleswig-Holstein-Liga played each other for two more spot in the Regionalliga. In the promotion round each team met the other just once with the two highest-placed teams in the final table promoted, however the final two matches were deemed obsolete and played as friendly matches because the two promoted teams had already been determined.

Pos	Team	Pld	W	D	L	GF	GA	GD	Pts	Promotion	EUT	ALT	NOR	BSV
1	Eutin 08 (P)	2	2	0	0	2	0	+2	6	Promotion to Regionalliga	—	—	0–1	0–2
2	Altona 93 (P)	2	2	0	0	3	0	+3	6	Promotion to Regionalliga	—	—	—	—
3	Eintracht Northeim	2	0	0	2	0	2	−2	0		—	0–1	—	—
4	Bremer SV	2	0	0	2	0	3	−3	0		—	0–1	—	—

Source: Weltfussball.de
Rules for classification: 1) Points; 2) Head-to-head; 3) Decider;
(P) Promoted
