= Moody Chana =

German-Cameroonian footballer

Personal information
- Full name: Moody Osman Chana Nya
- Date of birth: 7 January 1999 (age 27)
- Place of birth: Leer, Germany
- Height: 1.86 m (6 ft 1 in)
- Position: Centre-back

Team information
- Current team: BSV Schwarz-Weiß Rehden
- Number: 33

Youth career
- 2007–2010: Schwarz-Weiß Röllinghausen
- 2010: SG Wattenscheid
- 2010–2017: Schalke 04
- 2017–2018: 1899 Hoffenheim

Senior career*
Years	Team	Apps	(Gls)
2017–2020	1899 Hoffenheim II	47	(0)
2020–2021	VfB Lübeck	5	(0)
2021–2022	Kickers Offenbach	8	(0)
2022–	BSV Schwarz-Weiß Rehden	2	(0)

International career^{‡}
2013–2014	Germany U15	3	(0)
- * Club domestic league appearances and goals as of 12 November 2022 ‡ National team caps and goals as of 15:31, 27 February 2021 (UTC)

Moody Osman Chana Nya (born 7 January 1999) is a German-Cameroonian footballer who plays as a centre-back for BSV Schwarz-Weiß Rehden.

== Career ==
Chana began his youth career at Schwarz-Weiß Röllinghausen and SG Wattenscheid, before joining the youth academy of Schalke 04 in 2010. He joined the under-19 team of 1899 Hoffenheim in 2017, and began playing for the club's second team. In 2020, Chana joined third-division club VfB Lübeck. In October 2020, he made an appearance for the club's reserve team in the Schleswig-Holstein-Liga. He made his professional debut for Lübeck in the 3. Liga on 27 February 2021, starting against Hallescher FC before being substituted out in the 72nd minute for Pascal Steinwender. The away match finished as a 2–1 loss for Lübeck.
