= SV Bevern =

Sports club from Bevern, Germany

- Full name: Sportverein Bevern e.V.
- Nickname: Die Macht vom Calhorner Mühlenbach
- Founded: 1975
- Ground: Sportpark Wernsing; Bevern, Germany
- Capacity: 1,800
- Coordinates: 52.7394°N 8.0178°E
- Chairman: Hans-Jürgen Dreckmann
- Coach: Olaf Blancke
- League: Landesliga Weser-Ems (VI)
- 2020–21: 8th
Home colours	Away colours

SV Bevern is a German sports club from Bevern, mostly known for its football division. The club's colors are yellow and black.

== History ==
SV Bevern was founded in 1975. In the 2000s, the club played on Kreis (English: district) level in the district of Cloppenburg. In 2013, SV Bevern won the Kreispokal (English: district cup) and finished first in the Kreisliga Cloppenburg, being promoted to the Bezirksliga Weser-Ems 4. After being the Bezirksliga champions in 2016, they were promoted to the Landesliga Weser-Ems.

In 2019, SV Bevern became the champions of the Landesliga Weser-Ems. This usually would have meant a promotion to the Lower Saxon Oberliga, the fifth-highest league in Germany. However, SV Bevern declined the promotion for economical reasons. This allowed Kickers Emden to be promoted to the Oberliga despite coming in second. As of 2021, SV Bevern continues to play in the Landesliga.

== Grounds ==
The club plays its home matches at its headquarters north of Bevern. In 2017, the grounds were named "Sportpark Wernsing" after a sponsor.

== Divisions ==
SV Bevern consists of several divisions. It has 3 men's and 2 women's football teams and several youth football teams in seven different age groups. Aside from football, SV Bevern also practises aerobics, dancing and gymnastics.

== Current Team ==
As of 22 August 2021

Note: Flags indicate national team as defined under FIFA eligibility rules; some limited exceptions apply. Players may hold more than one non-FIFA nationality.

No.	Pos.	Nation	Player
1	GK	GER	Till Puncak
12	GK	GER	Tobias Brengelmann
23	GK	GER	Tim Kröger
2	DF	GER	Louis Koopmann
3	DF	GER	Jannis Wichmann
4	DF	GER	Matthis Hennig
6	DF	GER	Joshua König
18	DF	GER	Maximilian Hoffmann
19	DF	GER	Efthimios Stoimenou
7	MF	GER	Bernd Gerdes

No.	Pos.	Nation	Player
8	MF	GER	Kristen Bramscher
11	MF	ALB	Albi Dosti
16	MF	GER	Nico Thoben
17	MF	GER	Leon Theodor Neldner
21	MF	ALB	Luca Luniku
5	FW	GER	Rami Kanjo
9	FW	GER	Sebastian Sander
10	FW	GER	Sascha Thale (captain)
14	FW	GER	Julius Liegmann
20	FW	GER	Paul Tepe

== Recent seasons ==
Season	Position	League
2001–02	5	2nd Kreisklasse (X)
2002–03	8	2nd Kreisklasse
2003–04	14	2nd Kreisklasse
2004–05	1	3rd Kreisklasse (XI)
2005–06	2	2nd Kreisklasse
2006–07	2	2nd Kreisklasse
2007–08	10	1st Kreisklasse (IX)
2008–09	2 ▲	1st Kreisklasse
2009–10	4	Kreisliga Cloppenburg (VIII)
2010–11	5	Kreisliga Cloppenburg
2011–12	3	Kreisliga Cloppenburg
2012–13	1	Kreisliga Cloppenburg
2013–14	10	Bezirksliga Weser-Ems 4 (VII)
2014–15	5	Bezirksliga Weser-Ems 4
2015–16	1	Bezirksliga Weser-Ems 4
2016–17	6	Landesliga Weser-Ems (VI)
2017–18	11	Landesliga Weser-Ems
2018–19	1	Landesliga Weser-Ems
2019–20	4	Landesliga Weser-Ems
2020–21	8	Landesliga Weser-Ems

== Honors ==
- Landesliga Weser-Ems Champions: 2019
- Bezirksliga Weser-Ems 4 Champions: 2016
- Kreisliga Cloppenburg Champions: 2013
- Kreispokal Cloppenburg Winners: 2013

== Records ==
- Highest Win
  - 7–1 SV Molbergen, 3 July 2021
  - 6–0 SV DJK Elsten, 9 July 2021
- Highest Loss
  - 1–4 VfL Oldenburg, 16 August 2020
  - 0–3 Blau-Weiß Lohne, 6 October 2019
  - 0–3 SV Hansa Friesoythe, 21 August 2021
