= 2015–16 Niedersachsenliga =

- Season: 2015–16
- Champions: Lupo Martini Wolfsburg
- Promoted: Lupo Martini Wolfsburg Germania Egestorf
- Relegated: TuS Lingen VfL Bückeburg Teutonia Uelzen
- Matches: 240
- Top goalscorer: Keven Oltmer (21 goals)
- Total attendance: 54,308
- Average attendance: 226
- All statistics correct as of 16 May 2016.

The 2015–16 season of the Niedersachsenliga, the highest association football league in the German state of Lower Saxony, was the eighth season of the league at tier five (V) of the German football league system.

The season began on 7 August 2015 and finished on 22 May 2016, interrupted by a winter break from 20 December to 7 February.

== 2015–16 standings ==
The 2015–16 season saw five new clubs in the league, VfL Bückeburg, SVG Göttingen, Heeslinger SC and TuS Lingen, all four promoted from the Landesligas, while FT Braunschweig was relegated from the Regionalliga Nord.

Of the Niedersachsenliga teams only Lupo Martini Wolfsburg and Germania Egestorf applied for a Regionalliga licence for the 2016–17 season, with the Northern German Football Association deciding on 9 May 2016 to grant all applicants a licence.

Pos	Team	Pld	W	D	L	GF	GA	GD	Pts	Promotion, qualification or relegation
1	Lupo-Martini Wolfsburg (C, P)	30	22	6	2	74	27	+47	72	Promotion to Regionalliga Nord
2	Germania Egestorf (P)	30	16	5	9	63	39	+24	53	Qualification to promotion playoffs
3	SSV Jeddeloh	30	14	8	8	62	56	+6	50	
4	Eintract Northeim	30	14	6	10	64	52	+12	48	
5	SC Spelle-Venhaus	30	12	8	10	65	54	+11	44	
6	SVG Göttingen	30	11	10	9	55	44	+11	43	
7	FT Braunschweig	30	12	7	11	51	52	−1	43	
8	VfL Osnabrück II (Note: Reserve teams of 3. Liga clubs are ineligible for Regionalliga promotion.)	30	11	9	10	51	48	+3	42	
9	VfL Oldenburg	30	11	9	10	47	44	+3	42	
10	Arminia Hannover	30	12	5	13	52	50	+2	41	
11	TuS Lingen (X)	30	11	7	12	57	47	+10	40	Withdrawn to 2. Kreisklasse (Note: TuS Lingen withdrew to the 2. Kreisklasse for the following season for financial reasons.)
12	1. FC Wunstorf	30	10	10	10	52	48	+4	40	
13	Heeslinger SC	30	12	4	14	48	54	−6	40	
14	TB Uphusen	30	9	6	15	43	69	−26	33	
15	VfL Bückeburg (R)	30	7	4	19	42	77	−35	25	Relegation to Landesliga
16	Teutonia Uelzen (R)	30	3	2	25	32	97	−65	11	Relegation to Landesliga

Source: soccerway.com
Rules for classification: 1) Points; 2) Goal difference; 3) Goals scored; 4) head-to-head results; 5) goals scored away from home against opponent; 6) goals scored away from home; 7) drawing of lots
(C) Champions; (P) Promoted; (R) Relegated; (X) Voluntarily demoted

=== Top goalscorers ===
The top goal scorers for the season:

Rank	Player	Club	Goals
1	(Germany) Keven Oltmer	SSV Jeddeloh	21
2	(Germany) Nils Hillemann	Eintracht Northeim	18
3	(Germany) Sascha Wald	SC Spelle-Venhaus	16
3	(Germany) Julian Bennert	SSV Jeddeloh	16
3	(Germany) André Jädtke	VfL Oldenburg	16

== Promotion play-off ==
Promotion play-off were to be held at the end of the season to the Regionalliga Nord. The runners-up of the Niedersachsenliga and the champions or, in Hamburg's case, the only team applying for a licence, of the Bremen-Liga, Oberliga Hamburg and Schleswig-Holstein-Liga played each other for two more spot in the Regionalliga. In the promotion round each team met the other just once with the two highest-placed teams in the final table promoted:

Pos	Team	Pld	W	D	L	GF	GA	GD	Pts	Promotion	GER	SVE	ALT	BSV
1	Germania Egestorf (P)	3	1	2	0	5	4	+1	5	Promotion to Regionalliga	—	2–2	2–1	—
2	SV Eichede (P)	3	1	2	0	5	4	+1	5	Promotion to Regionalliga	—	—	—	2–1
3	Altona 93	3	1	1	1	4	3	+1	4		—	1–1	—	—
4	Bremer SV	3	0	1	2	2	5	−3	1		1–1	—	0–2	—

Source: Weltfussball.de
Rules for classification: 1) Points; 2) Head-to-head; 3) Decider;
(P) Promoted
