= 2017–18 Regionalliga =

10th season of the Regionalliga

Regionalliga
- Season: 2017–18
- Champions: Weiche Flensburg (Nord); Energie Cottbus (Nordost); KFC Uerdingen (West); 1. FC Saarbrücken (Südwest); 1860 Munich (Bayern)
- Promoted: Energie Cottbus; 1860 Munich; KFC Uerdingen
- Relegated: Eintracht Braunschweig II; VfV Hildesheim; Eutin 08; Altona 93; Chemie Leipzig; TSG Neustrelitz; FSV Luckenwalde; FC Wegberg-Beeck; TuS Erndtebrück; Westfalia Rhynern; TuS Koblenz; Hessen Kassel; Stuttgarter Kickers; Schott Mainz; Röchling Völklingen; SV Seligenporten; FC Unterföhring

The 2017–18 Regionalliga was the tenth season of the Regionalliga, the sixth under the new format, as the fourth tier of the German football league system.

== Regionalliga Nord ==
18 teams from the states of Bremen, Hamburg, Lower Saxony and Schleswig-Holstein competed in the sixth season of the reformed Regionalliga Nord; 15 teams were retained from last season and 3 were promoted from the Oberliga, namely 2016–17 Niedersachsenliga champions SSV Jeddeloh and promotion round winners Eutin 08, 2016–17 Schleswig-Holstein-Liga champions, and Altona 93, 2016–17 Oberliga Hamburg champions. The season started on 28 July 2017.

Pos	Team	Pld	W	D	L	GF	GA	GD	Pts	Qualification or relegation
1	Weiche Flensburg (C)	34	21	10	3	61	25	+36	73	Qualification to promotion play-offs
2	Hamburger SV II	34	21	9	4	66	31	+35	72	
3	VfL Wolfsburg II	34	19	8	7	65	34	+31	65	
4	VfB Lübeck	34	19	4	11	55	41	+14	61	
5	Germania Egestorf/Langreder	34	16	6	12	53	45	+8	54	
6	FC St. Pauli II	34	14	9	11	60	44	+16	51	
7	SSV Jeddeloh	34	15	4	15	57	56	+1	49	
8	Hannover 96 II	34	11	13	10	36	30	+6	46	
9	Eintracht Norderstedt	34	11	12	11	54	58	−4	45	
10	Lüneburger SK Hansa	34	12	9	13	41	47	−6	45	
11	TSV Havelse	34	12	9	13	51	59	−8	45	
12	SV Drochtersen/Assel	34	10	14	10	42	35	+7	44	
13	VfB Oldenburg	34	11	7	16	43	52	−9	40	
14	Eintracht Braunschweig II (Note: Eintracht Braunschweig was relegated from the 2017–18 2. Bundesliga, therefore their reserve team Eintracht Braunschweig II was relegated to the Oberliga, sparing Schwarz-Weiß Rehden from relegation.) (R)	34	11	7	16	51	65	−14	40	Relegation to Oberliga
15	Schwarz-Weiß Rehden	34	10	9	15	45	53	−8	39	
16	VfV Hildesheim (R)	34	6	10	18	25	59	−34	28	Relegation to Oberliga
17	Eutin 08 (R)	34	6	6	22	51	80	−29	24	Relegation to Oberliga
18	Altona 93 (R)	34	7	2	25	31	73	−42	23	Relegation to Oberliga

Source: kicker.de
Rules for classification: 1) Points; 2) Goal difference; 3) Goals scored
(C) Champions; (R) Relegated

== Regionalliga Nordost ==
18 teams from the states of Berlin, Brandenburg, Mecklenburg-Vorpommern, Saxony and Thuringia competed in the sixth season of the reformed Regionalliga Nordost; 15 teams were retained from last season and 3 teams were promoted from the Oberliga. VSG Altglienicke were promoted from 2016–17 NOFV-Oberliga Nord and BSG Chemie Leipzig from 2016–17 NOFV-Oberliga Süd. A play-off was held between the two leagues' runners-up, Optik Rathenow and Germania Halberstadt, to determine the last participant. Halberstadt won the play-off on aggregate and were promoted. The season started on 29 July 2017.

Pos	Team	Pld	W	D	L	GF	GA	GD	Pts	Qualification or relegation
1	Energie Cottbus (C, O, P)	34	28	5	1	79	14	+65	89	Qualification to promotion play-offs
2	Wacker Nordhausen	34	15	13	6	48	29	+19	58	
3	Berliner AK 07	34	15	11	8	63	47	+16	56	
4	BFC Dynamo	34	16	6	12	70	50	+20	54	
5	SV Babelsberg	34	13	14	7	52	38	+14	53	
6	Lokomotive Leipzig	34	14	11	9	48	36	+12	53	
7	Germania Halberstadt	34	14	10	10	68	52	+16	52	
8	Hertha BSC II	34	13	9	12	54	45	+9	48	
9	Union Fürstenwalde	34	13	8	13	59	52	+7	47	
10	ZFC Meuselwitz	34	10	13	11	44	44	0	43	
11	VfB Auerbach	34	10	13	11	47	51	−4	43	
12	Oberlausitz Neugersdorf	34	11	10	13	47	53	−6	43	
13	Viktoria Berlin	34	11	9	14	49	54	−5	42	
14	Budissa Bautzen	34	10	11	13	31	47	−16	41	
15	VSG Altglienicke	34	9	11	14	30	41	−11	38	
16	Chemie Leipzig (R)	34	8	11	15	21	51	−30	35	Relegation to NOFV-Oberliga
17	TSG Neustrelitz (R)	34	8	3	23	36	75	−39	27	Relegation to NOFV-Oberliga
18	FSV Luckenwalde (R)	34	1	6	27	25	93	−68	9	Relegation to NOFV-Oberliga

Source: kicker.de
Rules for classification: 1) Points; 2) Goal difference; 3) Goals scored
(C) Champions; (O) Play-off winners; (P) Promoted; (R) Relegated

== Regionalliga West ==
18 teams from North Rhine-Westphalia competed in the sixth season of the reformed Regionalliga West; 14 teams retained from last season and 4 promoted from the Oberliga. Originally, SC Paderborn were relegated from the 2016–17 3. Liga, but retained their place in 3. Liga following 1860 Munich's failure to obtain a license for the 2017–18 3. Liga. KFC Uerdingen were promoted from the 2016–17 Oberliga Niederrhein, TuS Erndtebrück and Westfalia Rhynern from the 2016–17 Oberliga Westfalen and FC Wegberg-Beeck from the 2016–17 Oberliga Mittelrhein. The season started on 28 July 2017.

Pos	Team	Pld	W	D	L	GF	GA	GD	Pts	Qualification or relegation
1	KFC Uerdingen (C, O, P)	34	22	10	2	68	24	+44	76	Qualification to promotion play-offs
2	Viktoria Köln	34	21	9	4	85	36	+49	72	
3	Wuppertaler SV	34	15	11	8	61	47	+14	56	
4	Borussia Dortmund II	34	15	10	9	55	46	+9	55	
5	SV Rödinghausen	34	16	5	13	76	63	+13	53	Qualification to DFB-Pokal play-off
6	Alemannia Aachen	34	15	8	11	59	47	+12	53	
7	SC Wiedenbrück	34	15	7	12	55	48	+7	52	
8	SC Verl	34	11	17	6	47	33	+14	50	
9	Rot-Weiß Oberhausen	34	13	11	10	50	41	+9	50	
10	Rot-Weiss Essen	34	12	13	9	55	43	+12	49	
11	SG Wattenscheid	34	12	9	13	58	52	+6	45	
12	Borussia Mönchengladbach II	34	11	10	13	49	49	0	43	
13	Bonner SC	34	10	8	16	47	62	−15	38	
14	1. FC Köln II	34	10	7	17	49	62	−13	37	
15	Fortuna Düsseldorf II	34	10	6	18	42	59	−17	36	
16	FC Wegberg-Beeck (R)	34	7	7	20	37	78	−41	28	Relegation to Oberliga
17	TuS Erndtebrück (R)	34	6	8	20	28	67	−39	26	Relegation to Oberliga
18	Westfalia Rhynern (R)	34	5	4	25	29	93	−64	19	Relegation to Oberliga

Source: kicker.de
Rules for classification: 1) Points; 2) Goal difference; 3) Goals scored
(C) Champions; (O) Play-off winners; (P) Promoted; (R) Relegated

=== Westphalia DFB-Pokal play-off ===
As the Westphalian Football and Athletics Association is one of three regional associations with the most participating teams in their league competitions, they were allowed to enter a second team for the 2018–19 DFB-Pokal (in addition to the Westphalian Cup winners). A play-off took place between the best-placed eligible (non-reserve) Westphalian team of the Regionalliga West, SV Rödinghausen, and the best-placed eligible team of the Oberliga Westfalen, SV Lippstadt, with the winners qualifying for the DFB-Pokal.

31 May 2018
15:00 CEST

SV Lippstadt	1–3	SV Rödinghausen
Hoffmeier 88'	Report	Engelmann 6'; Kaçınoğlu 44'; Schlottke 45'

Stadion am Bruchbaum, Lippstadt
Attendance: 1,091
Referee: Lukas Sauer

== Regionalliga Südwest ==
19 teams from Baden-Württemberg, Hesse, Rhineland-Palatinate and Saarland competed in the sixth season of the Regionalliga Südwest; 13 teams were retained from last season and 4 were promoted from the Oberliga. Mainz 05 II and FSV Frankfurt were relegated from the 2016–17 3. Liga. Schott Mainz were promoted from the 2016–17 Oberliga Rheinland-Pfalz/Saar, Eintracht Stadtallendorf from the 2016–17 Hessenliga and SC Freiburg II from the 2016–17 Oberliga Baden-Württemberg. The runners-up of the other Oberligas had a play-off round which was won by Röchling Völklingen. The Chinese under-20 national team was about to participate in this season from November onwards to even out the fixture list, but the Chinese withdrew after one game following protests from pro-Tibet demonstrators. Accordingly, their participation was cancelled. The season started on 28 July 2017.

Pos	Team	Pld	W	D	L	GF	GA	GD	Pts	Qualification or relegation
1	1. FC Saarbrücken (C)	36	25	7	4	92	32	+60	82	Qualification to promotion play-offs
2	Waldhof Mannheim	36	22	5	9	62	32	+30	71	Qualification to promotion play-offs
3	Kickers Offenbach	36	20	6	10	68	43	+25	66	
4	SC Freiburg II	36	19	9	8	50	32	+18	66	
5	SV Elversberg	36	14	14	8	61	43	+18	56	
6	1899 Hoffenheim II	36	14	14	8	57	45	+12	56	
7	Mainz 05 II	36	14	9	13	52	56	−4	51	
8	TSV Steinbach	36	14	8	14	53	48	+5	50	
9	SSV Ulm	36	12	12	12	56	54	+2	48	
10	VfB Stuttgart II	36	13	9	14	52	62	−10	48	
11	Astoria Walldorf	36	11	9	16	58	61	−3	42	
12	Eintracht Stadtallendorf	36	11	9	16	46	63	−17	42	
13	Wormatia Worms	36	12	6	18	49	68	−19	42	
14	FSV Frankfurt	36	12	5	19	49	66	−17	41	
15	TuS Koblenz (R)	36	9	12	15	45	51	−6	39	Relegation to Oberliga
16	Hessen Kassel (R)	36	12	11	13	53	54	−1	38 (Note: Hessen Kassel was given a 9-point penalty for insolvency.)	Relegation to Oberliga
17	Stuttgarter Kickers (R)	36	9	9	18	49	72	−23	36	Relegation to Oberliga
18	Schott Mainz (R)	36	9	5	22	44	76	−32	32	Relegation to Oberliga
19	Röchling Völkingen (R)	36	6	9	21	39	77	−38	27	Relegation to Oberliga

Source: kicker.de
Rules for classification: 1) Points; 2) Goal difference; 3) Goals scored
(C) Champions; (R) Relegated

== Regionalliga Bayern ==
19 teams from Bavaria competed in the sixth season of the Regionalliga Bayern; 14 teams were retained from last season and 3 were promoted from the Bayernliga. FC Unterföhring were promoted from the Bayernliga Süd and VfB Eichstätt from the Bayernliga Nord. FC Pipinsried were also promoted as they beat Greuther Fürth II in the 2016–17 Bayernliga promotion play-off. Finally, in a play-off between the two losing teams, Greuther Fürth II beat Viktoria Aschaffenburg, obtaining the last open spot in the league. 1860 Munich were originally relegated from 2016–17 2. Bundesliga to 2017–18 3. Liga, but failed to obtain a license and therefore competed in the Regionalliga. This meant that this year's league was held with 19 teams instead of 18.

Pos	Team	Pld	W	D	L	GF	GA	GD	Pts	Qualification or relegation
1	1860 Munich (C, O, P)	36	26	5	5	87	27	+60	83	Qualification to promotion play-offs and DFB-Pokal
2	Bayern Munich II	36	22	8	6	84	41	+43	74	
3	Schweinfurt 05	36	20	8	8	79	52	+27	68	
4	VfR Garching	36	17	5	14	67	67	0	56	
5	1. FC Nürnberg II	36	17	4	15	70	61	+9	55	
6	FC Ingolstadt II	36	16	5	15	68	57	+11	53	
7	VfB Eichstätt	36	14	10	12	55	56	−1	52	
8	FC Augsburg II	36	14	8	14	55	44	+11	50	
9	Wacker Burghausen	36	14	8	14	53	49	+4	50	
10	FV Illertissen	36	12	13	11	50	50	0	49	
11	SV Schalding-Heining	36	15	4	17	59	72	−13	49	
12	TSV Buchbach	36	12	10	14	50	56	−6	46	
13	Greuther Fürth II	36	13	7	16	44	51	−7	46	
14	FC Pipinsried	36	11	11	14	43	62	−19	44	
15	1860 Rosenheim	36	9	14	13	43	55	−12	41	
16	FC Memmingen (O)	36	10	9	17	47	58	−11	39	Qualification to relegation play-offs
17	SpVgg Bayreuth (O)	36	11	5	20	53	79	−26	38	Qualification to relegation play-offs
18	SV Seligenporten (R)	36	9	9	18	39	58	−19	36	Relegation to Bayernliga
19	FC Unterföhring (Note: FC Unterföhring did not apply for a Regionalliga license for next season and will therefore be relegated.) (R)	36	3	11	22	36	87	−51	20	Relegation to Bayernliga

Source: kicker.de
Rules for classification: 1) Points; 2) Goal difference; 3) Goals scored
(C) Champions; (O) Play-off winners; (P) Promoted; (R) Relegated

=== Relegation play-offs ===
The 16th and 17th placed teams from the Regionalliga play against the runners-up from the two Bayernliga divisions for two places in the next Regionalliga season.

Team 1	Agg.	Team 2	1st leg	2nd leg
TSV Rain am Lech	3–4	FC Memmingen	3–2	0–2
TSV Aubstadt	3–3 (a)	SpVgg Bayreuth	2–2	1–1

== Promotion play-offs ==
The draw for the 2017–18 promotion play-offs was held on 7 April, with another draw between the Regionalliga Südwest teams held on 27 April 2018.

=== Summary ===
The first legs were played on 24 May, and the second legs were played on 27 May 2018.

Team 1	Agg.	Team 2	1st leg	2nd leg
1. FC Saarbrücken (S1)	4–5	1860 Munich (B)	2–3	2–2
Weiche Flensburg (N)	2–3	Energie Cottbus (NO)	2–3	0–0
KFC Uerdingen (W)	3–0	Waldhof Mannheim (S2)	1–0	2–0 (Note: The match was stopped in the 82nd minute, with KFC Uerdingen leading 1–2, due to pyrotechnics from the Waldhof Mannheim fans, and the match was abandoned soon thereafter. The sports court of the DFB awarded a 0–2 win to KFC Uerdingen.)

=== Matches ===
All times Central European Summer Time (UTC+2)

24 May 2018
17:30

1. FC Saarbrücken	2–3	1860 Munich
Jänicke 44'; Schmidt 75'	Report	Mölders 1', 84'; Karger 47'

Hermann-Neuberger-Stadion, Völklingen
Attendance: 6,800
Referee: Guido Winkmann
27 May 2018
14:00

1860 Munich	2–2	1. FC Saarbrücken
Mölders 66' (pen.); Seferings 83'	Report	Mauersberger 33' (o.g.); Jacob 58'

Städtisches Stadion an der Grünwalder Straße, Munich
Attendance: 12,500
Referee: Markus Schmidt

1860 Munich won 5–4 on aggregate.

24 May 2018
19:00

Weiche Flensburg	2–3	Energie Cottbus
Jürgensen 68'; Guder 90'	Report	Mamba 16'; Zimmer 29', 38'

Holstein-Stadion, Kiel
Attendance: 5,972
Referee: Robert Kampka
27 May 2018
14:00

Energie Cottbus	0–0	Weiche Flensburg
	Report

Stadion der Freundschaft, Cottbus
Attendance: 20,056
Referee: Christian Dingert

Energie Cottbus won 3–2 on aggregate.

24 May 2018
19:00

KFC Uerdingen	1–0	Waldhof Mannheim
Beister 75'	Report

Schauinsland-Reisen-Arena, Duisburg
Attendance: 18,162
Referee: Robert Hartmann
27 May 2018
14:00

Waldhof Mannheim	0–2 Awarded	KFC Uerdingen
Mayer 32'	Report	Krempicki 29'; Öztürk 39'

Carl-Benz-Stadion, Mannheim
Attendance: 24,263
Referee: Patrick Ittrich

KFC Uerdingen won 3–0 on aggregate.
