= Bernd Gerdes =

German footballer

Personal information
- Date of birth: 3 November 1989 (age 36)
- Place of birth: Cloppenburg, West Germany
- Height: 1.78 m (5 ft 10 in)
- Position: Defensive midfielder

Team information
- Current team: SV Bevern
- Number: 7

Youth career
- 1994–2001: BV Kneheim
- 2001–2006: BV Cloppenburg

Senior career*
Years	Team	Apps	(Gls)
2006–2009	BV Cloppenburg	73	(7)
2009–2011	Werder Bremen II	50	(0)
2011–2012	Hessen Kassel	27	(0)
2012–2016	BV Cloppenburg	109	(7)
2016–	SV Bevern	91	(39)
Total		350	(53)
- * Club domestic league appearances and goals

Bernd Gerdes (born 3 November 1989) is a German professional footballer who plays as a midfielder for SV Bevern.
