= Tobias Fagerström =

Finnish footballer (born 2000)

Personal information
- Full name: Tobias Allan Diego Fagerström
- Date of birth: 12 July 2000 (age 26)
- Place of birth: Finland
- Height: 1.77 m (5 ft 10 in)
- Position: Forward

Team information
- Current team: Atlas Delmenhorst
- Number: 9

Youth career
- –2016: BK-46
- 2016–2019: Hamburger SV

Senior career*
Years	Team	Apps	(Gls)
2014–2016	BK-46	16	(5)
2019–2021	Hamburger SV II	18	(7)
2022	Teutonia Ottensen	0	(0)
2022	Inter Turku	3	(0)
2022	Inter Turku II	4	(1)
2023–2024	EIF	24	(1)
2024–	Atlas Delmenhorst	54	(16)

International career^{‡}
2015	Finland U15	1	(0)
2016	Finland U16	2	(0)
2017	Finland U17	5	(2)
2017	Finland U19	2	(0)
2017–2018	Finland U19	6	(0)
2019	Finland U21	3	(0)
- * Club domestic league appearances and goals as of 22 September 2026 ‡ National team caps and goals as of 19 February 2024

Tobias Allan Diego Fagerström (born 12 July 2000) is a Finnish professional footballer who plays as a forward for Atlas Delmenhorst in Oberliga Niedersachsen.

== Club career ==
Fagerström played in the youth sector of Bollklubben-46 (BK-46) in Karis.

In 2016, Fagerström signed with Hamburger SV for a €100,000 fee.

After spending six years in Germany with HSV organisation and Teutonia Ottensen, Fagerström returned to Finland in July 2022 and signed with FC Inter Turku. He debuted in Veikkausliiga with Inter on 11 September, in a 1–1 away draw against Ilves.

In December 2022, Fagerström signed with Ekenäs IF (EIF) in second tier Ykkönen. At the end of the 2023 season, EIF won a promotion to Veikkausliiga for the second time in the club's entire history. In November 2023, his deal with EIF was extended.

In August 2024, Fagerström returned to Germany and signed with Atlas Delmenhorst in Oberliga Niedersachsen.
