= SSV Jeddeloh =

German football club

- Full name: Spiel- und Sportverein Jeddeloh II e.V.
- Founded: 15 June 1951; 75 years ago
- Ground: HASKAMP-Arena
- Capacity: 2,000
- Chairman: Jürgen Ries
- Manager: vacant
- League: Regionalliga Nord (IV)
- 2025–26: Regionalliga Nord, 4th of 18
- Website: http://www.ssvjeddeloh.de/
Home colours	Away colours

Spiel- und Sportverein Jeddeloh II e.V., commonly known as SSV Jeddeloh or SSV Jeddeloh II, is a German association football club based in the community of Jeddeloh II in the municipality of Edewecht, located in the district of Ammerland, Lower Saxony.

== History ==
The team was founded on 15 June 1951. In 2002 they reached the Kreisliga for the first time, and two years later they were promoted to the bezirksliga. In 2012 they reached the Oberliga.

In 2017, SSV Jeddeloh prematurely secured the Oberliga Niedersachsen championship and thus managed promotion to the Regionalliga Nord, where in the 2017–18 season the team finished seventh. The highlight of the season was the derby against VfB Oldenburg in front of 2,000 spectators, which Jeddeloh won 2–0.

In 2026, SSV Jeddeloh participated in the DFB-Pokal for the second time ever after a loss in the first round in their previous participation in 2018, and won 5-2 against 1. FC Heidenheim, which gave the club national recognition in German football.

== Stadium ==
The club plays its home matches at the 53acht-Arena, previously known as the Sportplatz Wischenstraße, which has a capacity of 1,500. The stadium has no grandstand.

== Recent seasons ==
The recent season-by-season performance of the club:

Season	League	Position	W	D	L	GF	GA	Pts
2006–07	Bezirksliga Weser/Ems 2	1st ↑	23	7	0	85	26	76
2007–08	Bezirksoberliga Weser/Ems	14th ↓	7	12	11	59	58	33
2008–09	Bezirksliga Weser/Ems 2	1st ↑	21	4	5	89	40	67
2009–10	Bezirksoberliga Weser/Ems	11th	14	8	12	64	41	50
2010–11	Landesliga Weser-Ems	2nd	18	11	7	77	58	65
2011–12	Landesliga Weser/Ems	1st ↑	20	6	6	76	41	66
2012–13	Oberliga Niedersachsen	8th	12	8	10	55	59	44
2013–14	Oberliga Niedersachsen	10th	11	8	11	54	55	41
2014–15	Oberliga Niedersachsen	3rd	18	7	5	69	41	61
2015–16	Oberliga Niedersachsen	3rd	14	8	8	62	56	50
2016–17	Oberliga Niedersachsen	1st ↑	22	2	6	72	44	68
2017–18	Regionalliga Nord	7th	15	4	15	57	56	49
2018–19	Regionalliga Nord	12th	12	7	15	47	65	43
2019–20	Regionalliga Nord	15th						
2020–21	Regionalliga Nord	(not played)						
2021–22	Regionalliga Nord	Group South, 6th						
2022–23	Regionalliga Nord	11th						
2023–24	Regionalliga Nord	14th						
2024–25	Regionalliga Nord	14th						
2025–26	Regionalliga Nord	4th	19	7	8	81	50	64

== Honours ==
- Oberliga Niedersachsen
  - Champions: 2016–17
- Landesliga Weser-Ems
  - Champions: 2011–12
- Bezirksliga Weser/Ems 2
  - Champions: 2006–07, 2008–09
- Lower Saxony Cup
  - Champions: 2026

== Players ==
=== Current squad ===
As of 8 September 2026

Note: Flags indicate national team as defined under FIFA eligibility rules; some limited exceptions apply. Players may hold more than one non-FIFA nationality.

No.	Pos.	Nation	Player
1	GK	GER	Moritz Onken
2	DF	GER	Kingsley Marcinek
4	DF	GER	Philip Gramberg
5	MF	JPN	Keita Taguchi
6	DF	GER	Fynn Friedrichs
7	MF	GER	Pascal Steinwender
8	MF	GER	Moritz Brinkmann
9	FW	GER	Simon Brinkmann
10	MF	KOS	Kamer Krasniqi
11	FW	GER	Tobias Bothe
12	GK	GER	Oskar Saathoff
15	MF	GER	Hugo Brandes

No.	Pos.	Nation	Player
16	MF	GER	Robin Krolikowski
17	FW	GER	Ole Böttcher
19	MF	GER	Adrian Asani
20	MF	GER	Tim Janßen
22	MF	GER	Diego Raykov
23	DF	GER	Tom Kanowski
25	GK	GER	Thure Fengler
26	FW	GER	Affem Ifeadigo
27	MF	MAR	Ismail H'Maidat
28	DF	GER	Niklas von Aschwege
37	FW	KOS	Haris Hyseni
47	DF	GER	Gazi Siala

=== Out on loan ===
Note: Flags indicate national team as defined under FIFA eligibility rules; some limited exceptions apply. Players may hold more than one non-FIFA nationality.

No.	Pos.	Nation	Player
12	GK	GER	Maximilian Rolfes (at SV Altenoythe until 30 June 2027)
