= Östliches Ringgebiet =

- Borough of Braunschweig
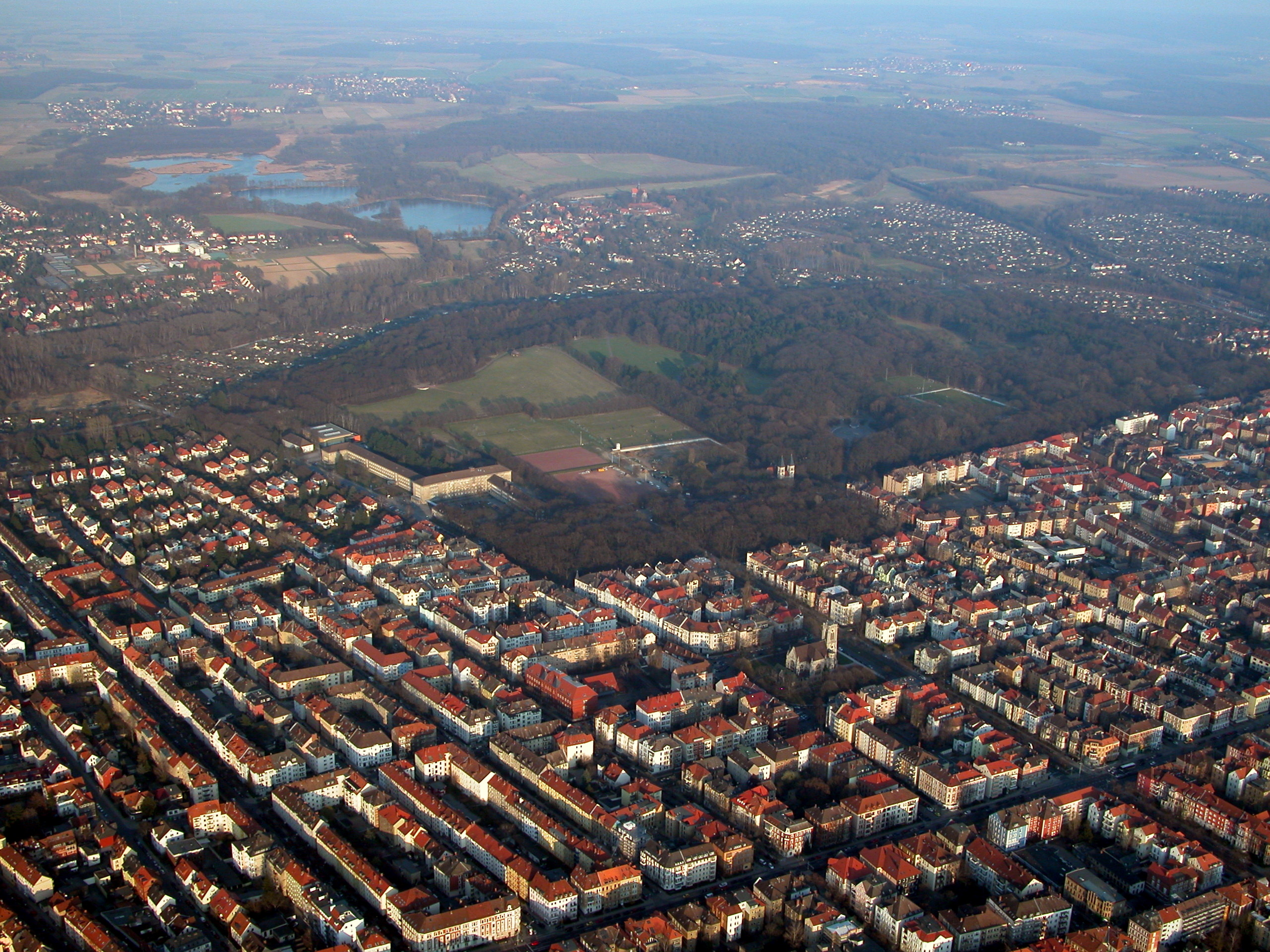
- Aerial view of Östliches Ringgebiet

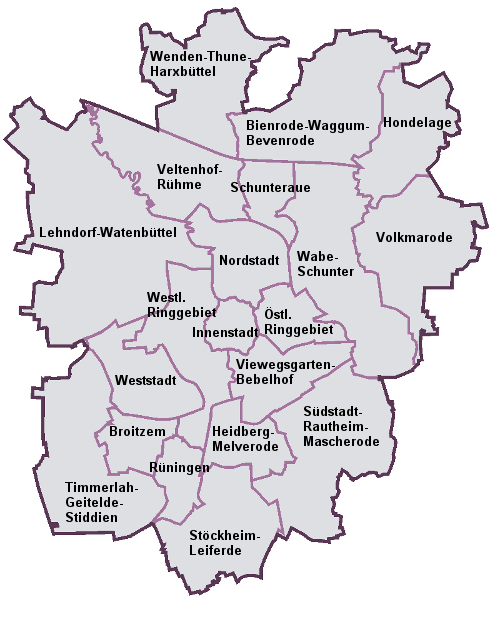
- Boroughs of Braunschweig
- Interactive map of Östliches Ringgebiet
- Location within Germany Location within Lower Saxony
- Coordinates: 52°16′9″N 10°32′33″E
- Country: Germany
- State: Lower Saxony
- District: Braunschweig urban district
- City: Braunschweig

Government
  - Mayor: Juliane Krause (Greens)

Area
  - Total: 3,976 km^{2} (1,535 sq mi)

Population (2020-12-31)
  - Total: 26,559
  - Density: 6.680/km^{2} (17.30/sq mi)
- Time zone: UTC+01:00 (CET)
  - Summer (DST): UTC+02:00 (CEST)
- Postal codes: 38102-38104-38106
- Dialling codes: 0531
- Vehicle registration: BS
- Website: Official Website

The Östliches Ringgebiet is a Stadtbezirk (borough) in the eastern part of Braunschweig, Germany. With a population of 26,559 (2020) it is the city's second most populous district.

== History ==
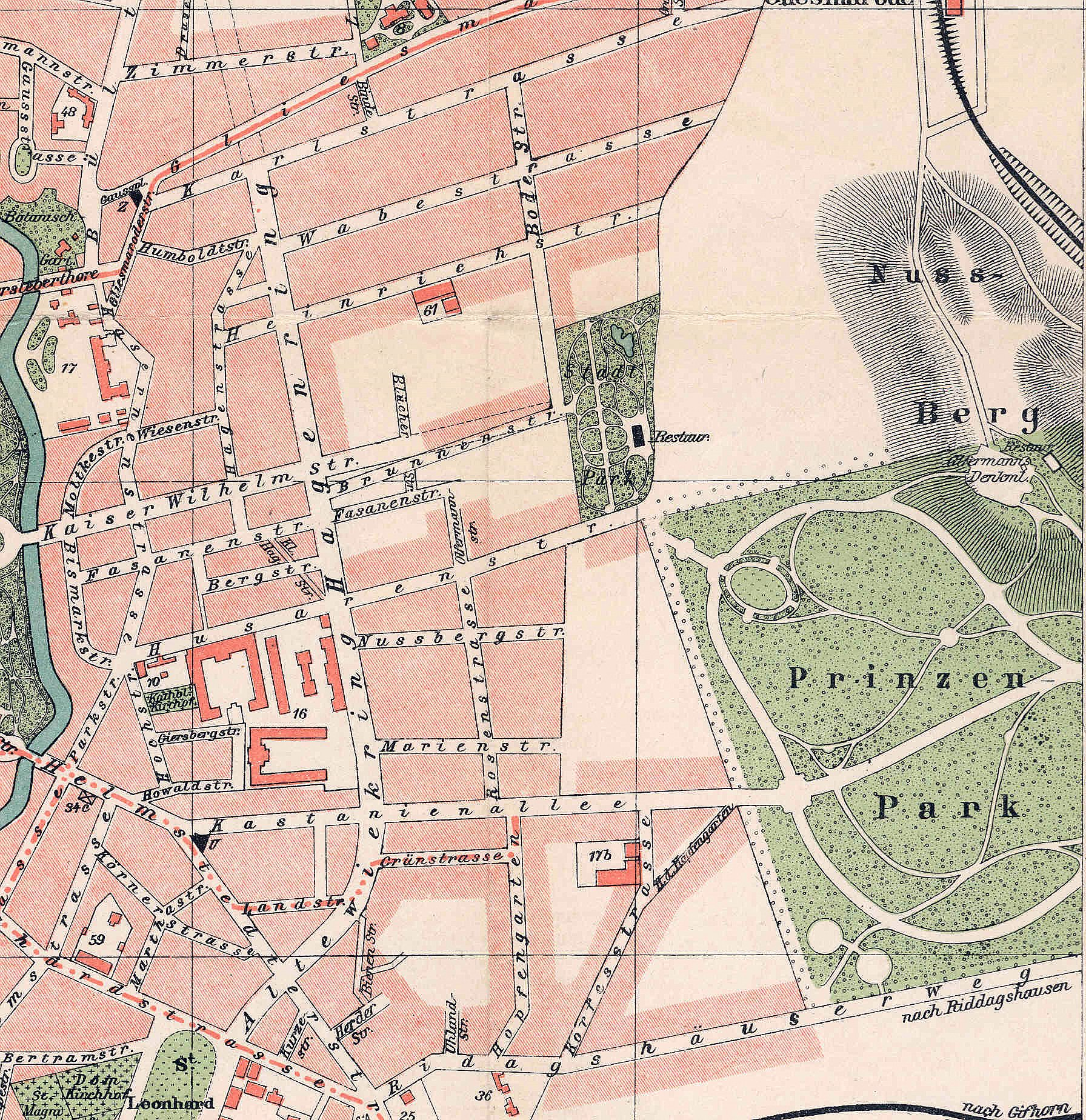
Map of Östliches Ringgebiet in 1899

Originally located outside of the city, the Östliche Ringgebiet (Eastern Ring Area) was developed as a residential area during the Gründerzeit in the late 19th century, when industrialisation caused a rapid growth of population in the city.

The centre of the district is the boulevard Jasperallee, originally Kaiser-Wilhelm-Straße, developed in 1889 by Ludwig Winter and modeled after Unter den Linden in Berlin. Lined with bourgeois townhouses, the Jasperallee connects the State Theatre in the west with the Stadtpark in the east. The name of the street was changed in 1946 to honour the social-democratic politician Heinrich Jasper, who died in 1945 in the Bergen-Belsen concentration camp.

== Politics ==
The district mayor Juliane Krause is a member of the Green party of Germany.

== Main sights ==
- The townhouses on Jasperallee.
- The neo-Gothic church St. Paul's (German: St. Pauli) and the neo-Romanesque church St. Matthew's (German: Matthäuskirche).
- The historical water tower Wasserturm auf dem Giersberg, built in 1901.
- The Mars-la-Tour barracks, former garrison of Brunswick's hussars.
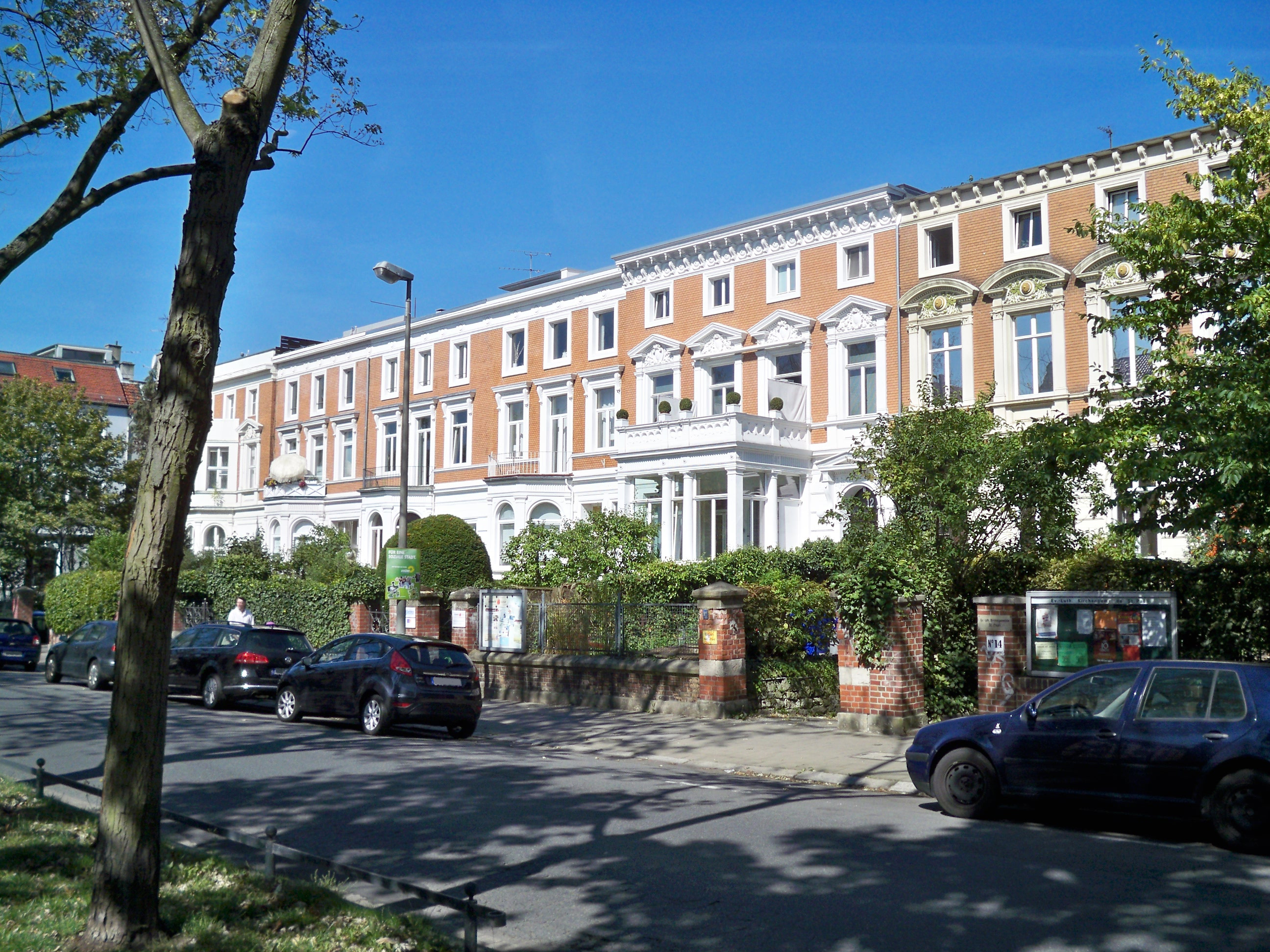
Townhouses on Jasperallee

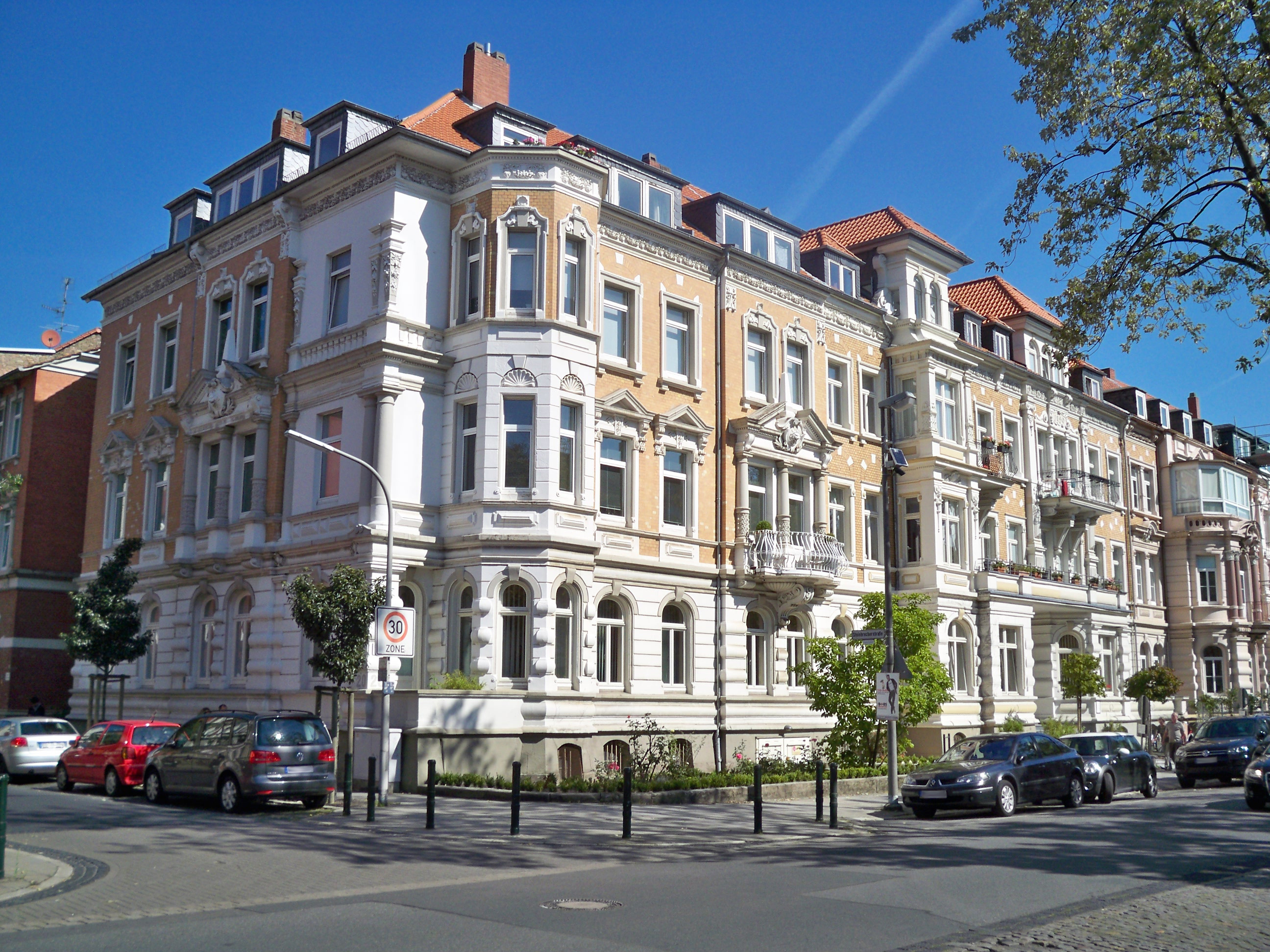
Townhouses on Jasperallee

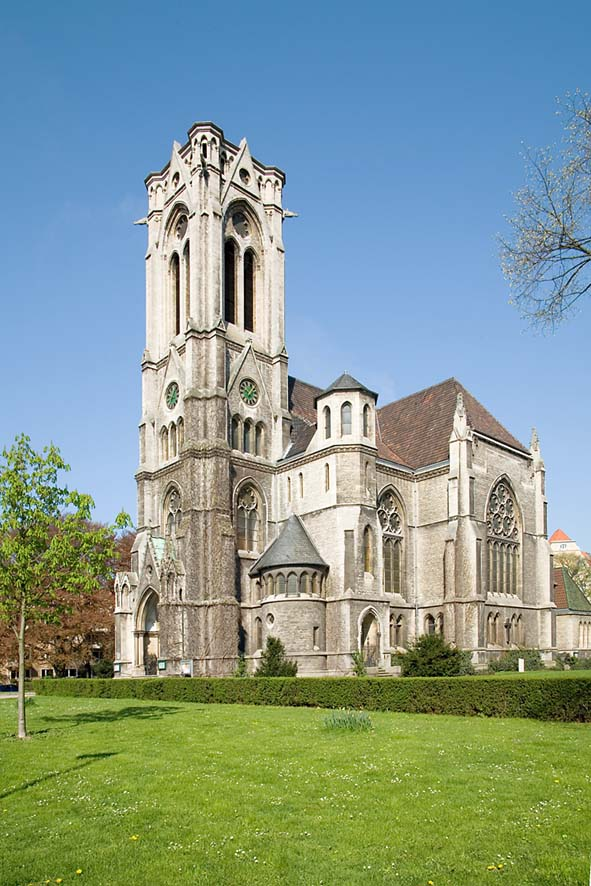
St. Paul's Church

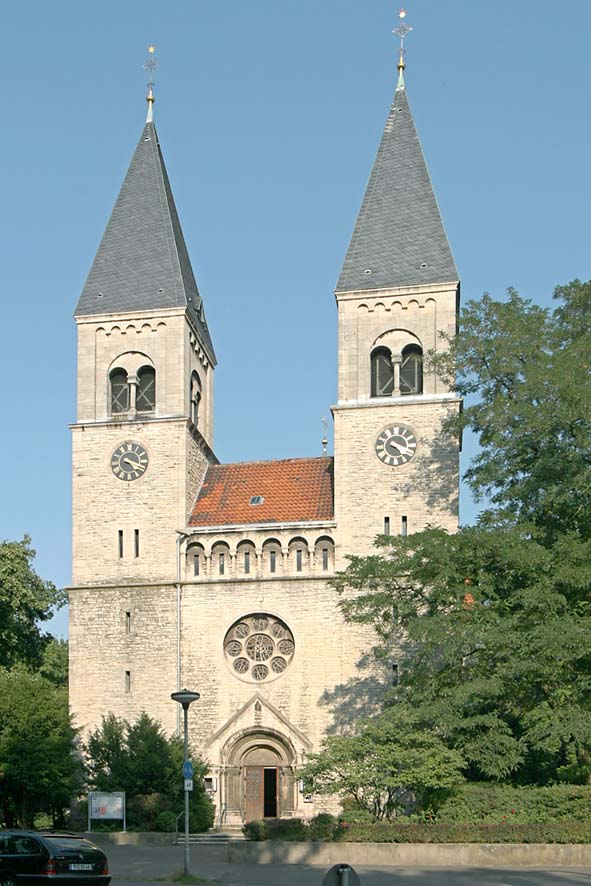
St. Matthew's Church

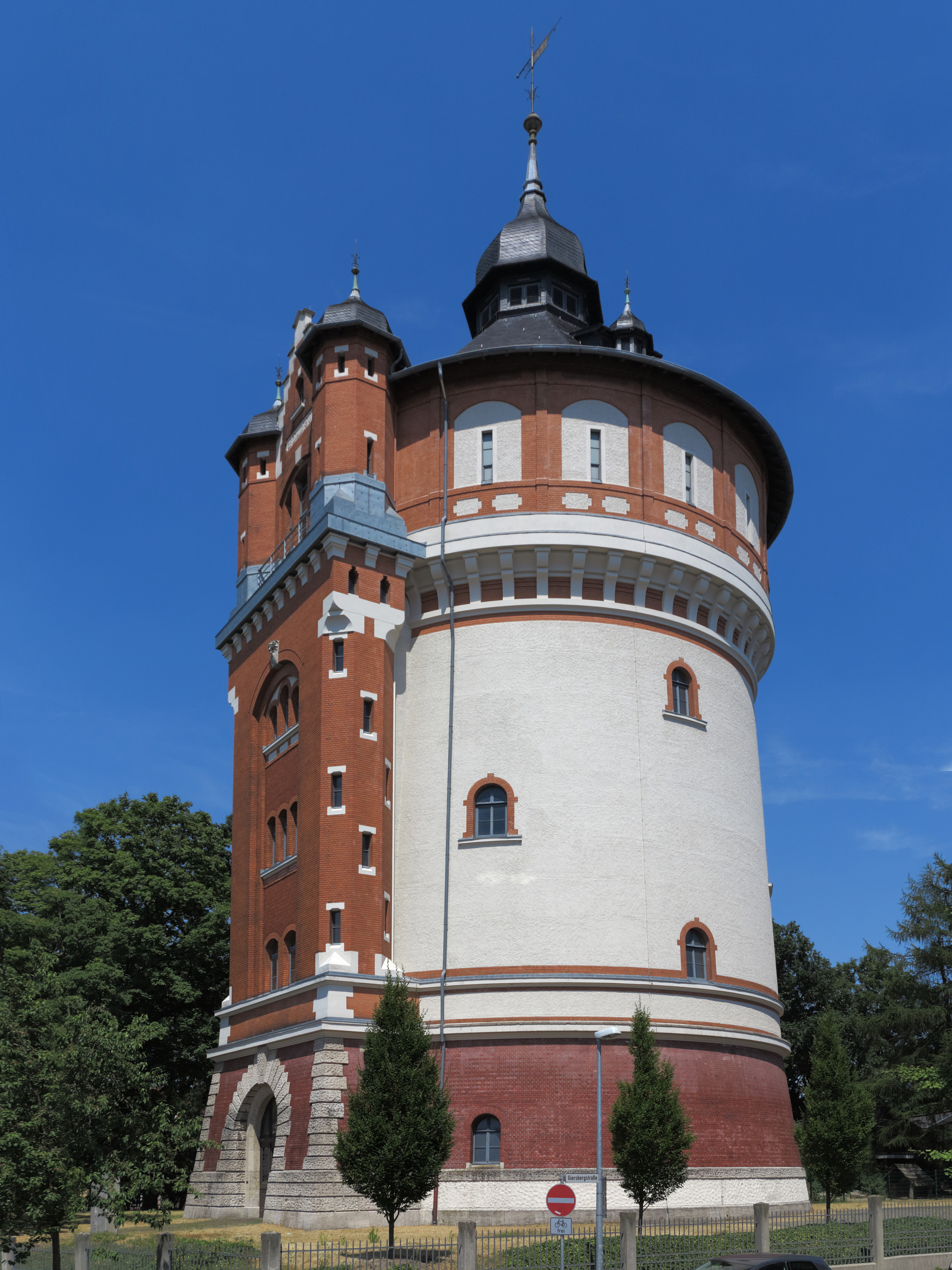
Wasserturm auf dem Giersberg

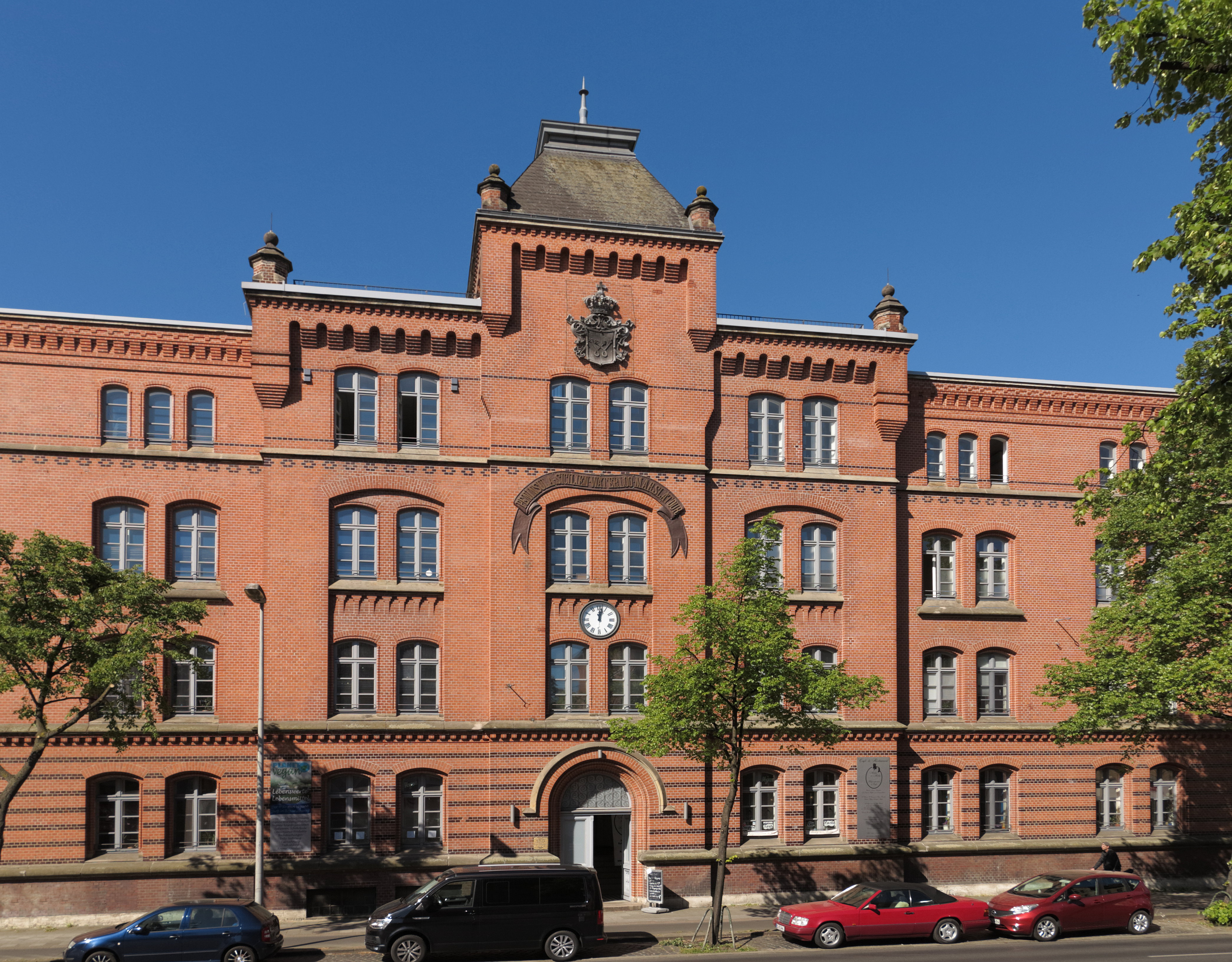
Mars-la-Tour barracks

== Sports and recreation ==
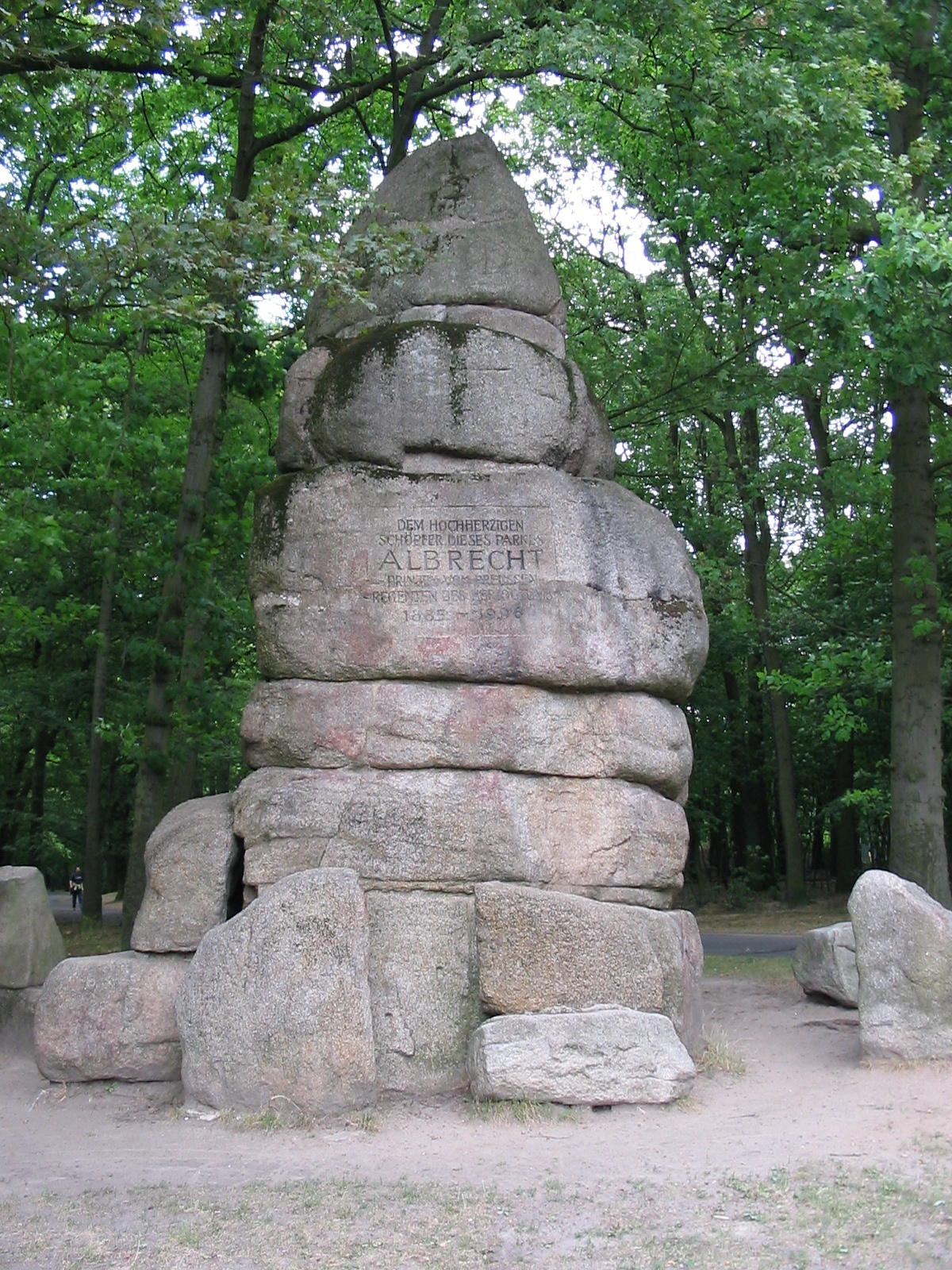
Prince Albert monument in Prinz-Albrecht-Park.

Two parks are located on the eastern end of the Östliche Ringgebiet, the Stadtpark and the Prinz-Albrecht-Park (short: Prinzenpark). The latter is named after Prince Albert of Prussia (German: Albrecht von Preußen), regent of the Duchy of Brunswick from 1885 to 1906.

From 1947 until 1951 the annual motorsport competition Prinzenpark-Rennen was held at a race track within the Prinz-Albrecht-Park. Prinzenparkstadion, the stadium of association football club FT Braunschweig, is also located within the park.
