= Angelos Argyris =

Greek footballer (born 1994)

Personal information
- Date of birth: 6 May 1994 (age 32)
- Place of birth: Volos, Greece
- Height: 1.84 m (6 ft 0 in)
- Position: Centre-back

Youth career
- 2010–2012: Niki Volos
- 2013: Tilikratis

Senior career*
Years	Team	Apps	(Gls)
2013–2015	Niki Volos	8	(0)
2015–2016	Werder Bremen II	23	(0)
2016–2017	Weiche Flensburg	21	(2)
2017	Weiche Flensburg II	1	(0)
2017–2018	Korona Kielce	0	(0)
2018–2019	VfB Oldenburg	24	(0)
2019–2020	Weiche Flensburg	23	(4)
2020–2021	Niki Volos		
2021–2023	BSV Schwarz-Weiß Rehden	35	(2)
2023	Agia Anna		
- * Club domestic league appearances and goals as of 02:59, 16 February 2024 (UTC)

Angelos Argyris (Greek: Άγγελος Αργύρης; born 6 May 1994) is a Greek professional footballer who plays as a centre-back.

== Career ==
Argyris made his professional debut in the Super League Greece for Niki Volos on 13 September 2014, starting in the away match against PAOK, which finished as a 3–0 loss.
