= TuS Bersenbrück =

German football club

- Full name: Turn- und Sportverein Bersenbrück von 1895 e. V.
- Founded: 1895
- Ground: Hasestadion
- Capacity: 3,000
- League: Oberliga Niedersachsen (V)
- 2025–26: Oberliga Niedersachsen, 9th of 16
- Website: http://www.xn--tus-bersenbrck-rsb.de/

Turn- und Sportverein Bersenbrück von 1895 e. V. is a German football club based in Bersenbrück, Lower Saxony. Founded in 1895, it plays in the Oberliga Niedersachsen in the fifth tier of the German football league system.

== History ==
The club won the Lower Saxony Cup for the first time in 1990, thereby qualifying for the DFB-Pokal. In the first round, it lost 4–0 at home to Hannover 96.

TuS Bersenbrück reached the state cup final again in 2019, losing the amateur final 3–2 to SV Atlas Delmenhorst. Four years later the club won the same event 3–0 against SC Spelle-Venhaus. This qualified it for the first round of the national cup again, where it lost 7–0 to Bundesliga side Borussia Mönchengladbach at the Stadion an der Bremer Brücke in Osnabrück.
