= Hans-Prull-Stadion =

Football stadium in Oldenburg, Germany

Coordinates: 53°9′18″N 8°12′41″E

- Interactive map of Hans-Prull-Stadion
- Full name: Hans-Prull-Stadion
- Location: Oldenburg, Germany
- Owner: VfL Oldenburg
- Operator: VfL Oldenburg
- Capacity: 4,000

Construction
- Opened: 1929

Tenant
- VfL Oldenburg

Hans-Prull-Stadion (formerly Stadion Alexanderstraße) is a stadium in Oldenburg, Germany. It is used for football matches and is the home ground of VfL Oldenburg.
