= Albi Dosti =

Albanian footballer (born 1991)

Personal information
- Date of birth: 13 September 1991 (age 35)
- Place of birth: Fushë-Krujë, Albania
- Height: 1.75 m (5 ft 9 in)
- Position: Midfielder

Team information
- Current team: SV Bevern

Youth career
- 2003–2007: Teuta

Senior career*
Years	Team	Apps	(Gls)
2007–2014	Teuta	120	(9)
2014–2015	Kukësi	17	(1)
2015	Montana	12	(0)
2016	Laçi	15	(0)
2016	Šibenik	16	(1)
2017	Bylis	8	(1)
2017	Teuta	8	(1)
2018–2022	SV Bevern	58	(7)

International career^{‡}
2007–2008	Albania U17	3	(1)
2011–2013	Albania U21	10	(2)
2014	Albania	1	(0)
- * Club domestic league appearances and goals ‡ National team caps and goals as of 8 August 2016

Albi Dosti (born 13 September 1991) is an Albanian professional footballer who plays as a midfielder for SV Bevern. He has also been a member of Albania national team, making one appearance in 2014.

== Club career ==
=== Early career ===
Dosti began his career with Teuta Durrës, making his debut at the age of 17. He has played over 6 league games for the club since making his debut in the 2007–08 season.

=== Kukësi ===
On 23 August 2013, Dosti joined fellow top flight side Kukësi by penning a 1+1 contract.

=== Montana ===
On 16 July 2015, Dosti signed a two-year deal with the Bulgarian side Montana, a club which plays in the elite of Bulgarian football. On 3 August, he made his A Group debut from the bench, coming into the game for Ivan Minchev in the 77th minute during the 2–1 loss against Litex Lovech at Lovech Stadium.

=== Laçi ===
On 27 January 2016, Dosti returned in Albania by signing a six-month contract with Laçi of Albanian Superliga, rejoining his first manager Stavri Nica.

=== Šibenik ===
On 12 July 2016, Dosti completed a transfer to Croatian Second Football League side Šibenik, penning a one-year contract. During an interview, he said that he turned down several offers from Albanian clubs just to play in Croatia, where, according to him, is shown proper attention to players.

=== Teuta Durrës ===
On 4 July 2017, Dosti returned to his first senior club Teuta Durrës by signing a contract for the 2017–18 season with an option to renew, taking the squad number 10. This marked his return in Durrës after four years, and Dosti commented this by stating: "I'm very happy to be part of Teuta for the upcoming season. I promise that I'll extenuate that trust of Teuta directors on me." Dosti started the season on 9 September by playing full-90 minutes in the opening match of 2017–18 Albanian Superliga against Luftëtari Gjirokastër which was won 2–1 at home. His first score-sheet contributions came later on matchday 5, scoring his team's only goal in a 2–1 home loss to Partizani Tirana. On 30 October, following the 2–1 defeat at Lushnja which was the fourth consecutive and fifth in six matches, Dosti was released by the club due to bad performances and being tagged as one of culprits for the team crisis.

=== Kukësi return ===
In November 2017, following his release from Teuta, Dosti returned to Kukësi but only to train and is set to sign in January transfer window.

=== SV Bevern ===
In December 2017, Dosti signed for German club SV Bevern.

== International career ==
On 8 June 2014, Dosti made his debut with Albania against San Marino at San Marino Stadium in Serravalle, replacing Armando Vajushi for the last 20 minutes of 3–0 away win.

== Career statistics ==
=== Club ===
As of 28 October 2017

Appearances and goals by club, season and competition
Club	Season	League			Cup		Europe		Total	
Club	Season	Division	Apps	Goals	Apps	Goals	Apps	Goals	Apps	Goals
Teuta Durrës	2007–08	Albanian Superliga	1	0	0	0	—		1	0
Teuta Durrës	2008–09	Albanian Superliga	27	1	2	0	—		29	1
Teuta Durrës	2009–10	Albanian Superliga	12	3	4	0	—		16	3
Teuta Durrës	2010–11	Albanian Superliga	12	1	1	0	—		13	1
Teuta Durrës	2011–12	Albanian Superliga	25	1	6	0	—		31	1
Teuta Durrës	2012–13	Albanian Superliga	15	1	5	0	2 (Note: All appearance(s) in UEFA Europa League)	0	22	1
Teuta Durrës	2013–14	Albanian Superliga	28	2	5	1	2	1	35	4
Teuta Durrës	Total		120	9	23	1	4	1	147	11
Kukësi (loan)	2014–15	Albanian Superliga	17	0	5	2	—		22	2
Montana	2015–16	Bulgarian First League	12	0	2	0	—		14	0
Laçi	2015–16	Albanian Superliga	15	0	3	0	—		18	0
Šibenik	2016–17	2.HNL	16	1	1	0	—		17	1
Bylis Ballsh	2016–17	Albanian First Division	8	1	0	0	—		8	1
Teuta Durrës	2017–18	Albanian Superliga	8	1	1	0	—		9	1
Career total			196	12	35	3	4	1	235	16

=== International ===
As of 8 June 2015

Appearances and goals by national team and year
National team	Year	Apps	Goals
Albania	2015	1	0
Total		1	0
