= Hubert Hüring =

German footballer

Personal information
- Date of birth: 27 May 1950
- Place of birth: Lathen, Germany
- Position: Midfielder

Youth career
- Raspo Lathen

Senior career*
Years	Team	Apps	(Gls)
1969–1970	SV Meppen		
1970–1972	VfL Osnabrück		
1972–1985	SV Meppen		

Managerial career
- 1985–1988: VfL Herzlake
- 1988–1990: TuS Lingen
- 1990–1991: SV Meppen (assistant)
- 1992–1993: VfL Osnabrück
- 1993–1995: Eintracht Nordhorn
- 1995–1997: VfB Oldenburg
- 1997–1998: TuS Lingen
- 1998–1999: SV Wilhelmshaven
- 1999–2000: BV Cloppenburg
- 2001–2005: BV Cloppenburg
- 2007–2008: SV Meppen
- 2009–2010: SV Meppen
- 2013–2014: SV Blau-Weiß Dörpen
- * Club domestic league appearances and goals

Hubert Hüring (born 27 May 1950) is a German former professional football player and manager, who played as a midfielder.
