= Flemming Niemann =

German footballer

Personal information
- Date of birth: 7 August 1996 (age 30)
- Place of birth: Minden, Germany
- Height: 1.89 m (6 ft 2 in)
- Position: Goalkeeper

Team information
- Current team: SV Rödinghausen
- Number: 15

Youth career
- 2012–2014: Arminia Bielefeld

Senior career*
Years	Team	Apps	(Gls)
2014–2016	Karlsruher SC II	13	(0)
2016–2019	FC Augsburg II	39	(0)
2019–2021	FC Carl Zeiss Jena II	1	(0)
2019–2021	FC Carl Zeiss Jena	5	(0)
2021–2023	Schwarz-Weiß Rehden	54	(0)
2024–	SV Rödinghausen	4	(0)
- * Club domestic league appearances and goals as of 12 October 2025

Flemming Niemann (born 7 August 1996) is a German footballer who plays for SV Rödinghausen.
