= Pascal Steinwender =

German footballer

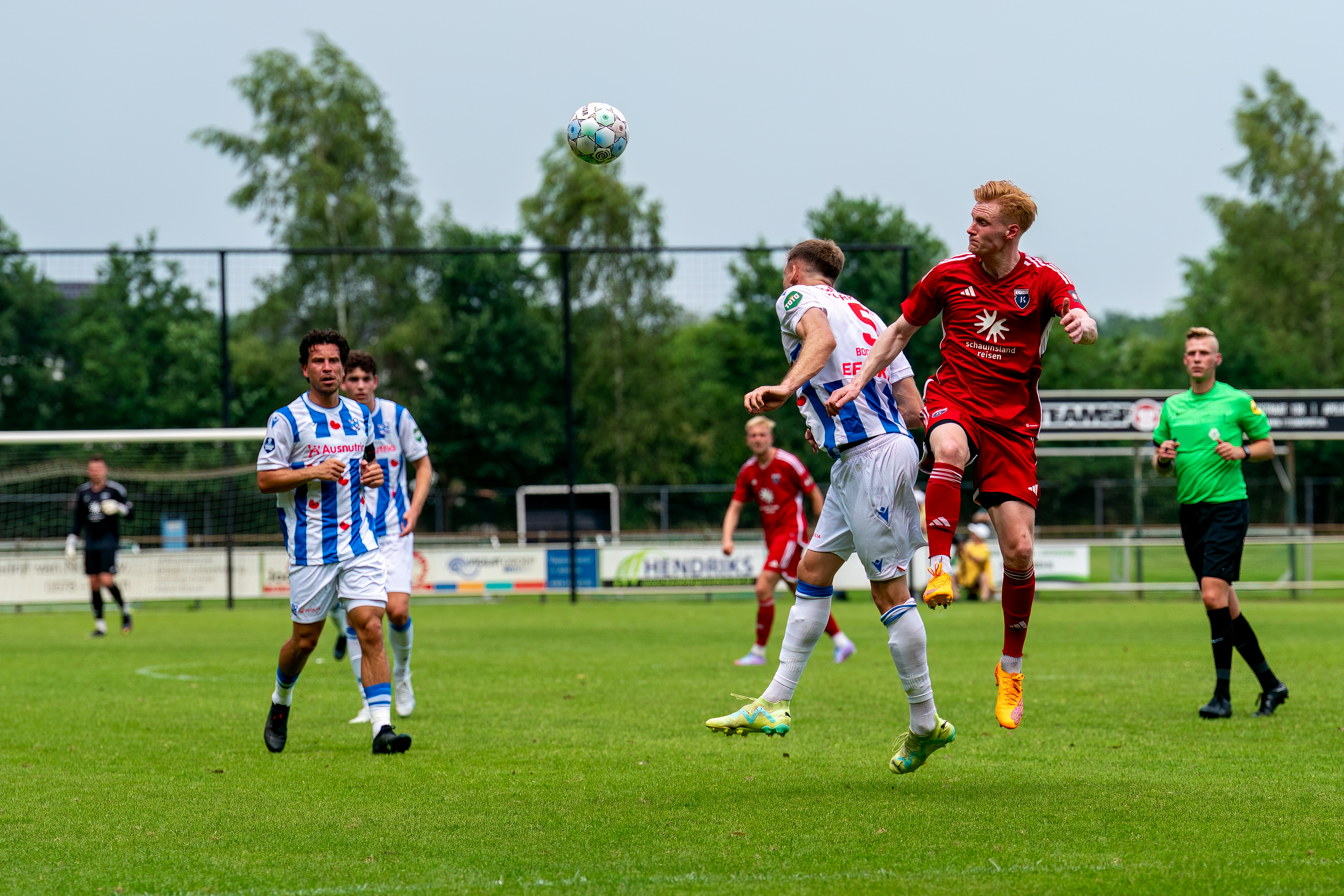
- Steinwender (red shirt, 2023)

Personal information
- Date of birth: 2 August 1996 (age 30)
- Place of birth: Germany
- Height: 1.81 m (5 ft 11 in)
- Position: Midfielder

Team information
- Current team: SSV Jeddeloh
- Number: 7

Youth career
- 2003–2013: VfB Oldenburg
- 2013–2015: JFV Nordwest

Senior career*
Years	Team	Apps	(Gls)
2015	VfB Oldenburg	7	(0)
2015	VfB Oldenburg II	5	(3)
2016–2018	VfL Oldenburg	60	(35)
2016	VfL Oldenburg II	2	(1)
2018–2020	VfB Oldenburg	48	(10)
2020–2021	SC Paderborn	2	(0)
2020–2021	→ VfB Lübeck (loan)	28	(3)
2021–2022	SC Verl	11	(1)
2022–2023	FC Teutonia Ottensen	21	(7)
2023–2025	Kickers Emden	61	(14)
2025–	SSV Jeddeloh	29	(4)
- * Club domestic league appearances and goals as of 22 September 2026

Pascal Steinwender (born 2 August 1996) is a German professional footballer who plays as a midfielder for SSV Jeddeloh.

== Career ==
Steinwender made his debut for SC Paderborn in the first round of the 2020–21 DFB-Pokal on 13 September 2020, coming on as a substitute in the 72nd minute for Kai Pröger against fourth-division side SC Wiedenbrück, which finished as a 5–0 away win. He made his 2. Bundesliga debut the following week on 20 September, coming on as a substitute for Christopher Antwi-Adjei in the 89th minute of Paderborn's away match against Holstein Kiel, which finished as a 1–0 loss.
