= HSC Hannover =

German football club

- Full name: Hannoverscher Sport-Club von 1893 e.V.
- Short name: HSC Hannover; Hannoverscher SC
- Founded: 1893
- Stadium: HSC-Stadion an der Constantinstraße
- Chairman: Frank Kuhlmann
- Coach: Vural Tasdelen
- League: Regionalliga Nord (IV)
- 2025–26: Regionalliga Nord, 13nd of 18
- Website: hsc-hannover.de
Home colours	Away colours

Hannoverscher Sport-Club von 1893 e.V., commonly referred to as HSC Hannover in association football and as Hannoverscher SC in handball, is a German sports club from Hanover, Lower Saxony. They are most known for their men's football team, which plays in the Regionalliga Nord, the fourth tier in the German football league system.

== History ==
On 1 September 1897, pupils founded the Fußsport-Verein 1897, which was a pure rugby club. This club was joined in 1910 by Herta 1910 Hannover and in 1913 by SuS 1911 Hannover. In 1918, the Fußsport-Verein merged with VfR Hannover to form Hannoverscher SC 02. VfR Hannover was formed through the merger of the clubs Hannoverscher SC and Germania Hannover. In 1927, the hockey club Hockeyklub Elite Hannover joined the HSC, before it merged with the football club Sport Rot-Weiß 1899 Hannover to form the Spielvereinigung Hannover 1897 one year later. FV Sport Rot-Weiß was founded in 1924 through the merger of FV Sport Hannover and SV Rot-Weiß Hannover.

On 15 January 1946, the Spielvereinigung and the members of the Freie Turnerschaft 1893 Hannover, which was dissolved in 1933, merged to form the HSC Hannover. The club grounds are located in the List district south of the Mittelland Canal. In the post-war period, a clubhouse was built in 1947 as an extension to an existing half-timbered house. Today's clubhouse was inaugurated in 1963 and expanded in 1968.

== Men's football ==
=== The predecessor clubs ===
After the end of World War I, Hannoverscher SC 02 reached the highest league, the Südkreisliga. In 1924 and 1925, the team was runner-up behind Arminia Hannover and Eintracht Braunschweig. One year later, the HSC 02 won its division, but lost the championship match against Arminia Hanover 1–2. As runner-up, a qualification match for the North German final round was played, which was won 6–2 against Bremer SV. In the final round of the North German Championship, after a 1–2 opening defeat against Hamburger SV, they won 2–1 against Altona 93 and were chosen by the sports press as the secret favorite. After two more defeats against Arminia Hannover and Holstein Kiel, the team finished fourth.

FV Sport Hannover also belonged to the founding members of the Südkreisliga in 1919, but mostly played against relegation. After the merger with SV Rot-Weiß, who did not make it into the highest league, the team was able to establish itself in the midfield of the league. In 1926 and 1927 FC Sport reached fourth place. In the first season under the new name Spielvereinigung in 1897, the team achieved the North German Championship. After a close 3–2 victory at Eimsbütteler SV, they had to accept a 0–8 defeat against Holstein Kiel in the quarter-finals. One year later, the team lost to Kiel with the same result. In 1932, the Spielvereinigung retired from the Oberliga Südhannover-Braunschweig.

Two years later, together with Borussia Harburg, the club was promoted to the Gauliga Niedersachsen, which was introduced in 1933. After one season, they were relegated from the first league again. In the first attempt at promotion in 1940, the team failed against I. SC Göttingen. Two years later, Nebeltruppe Celle landed ahead of them. Only in the third attempt in 1943 were they successfully promoted to the Gauliga Südhannover-Braunschweig, to which they belonged until the end of the war.

=== Hannoverscher SC ===
After World War II, the club settled at Constantinstraße, where the sports field was located between a gasometer and a rubbish dump. The HSC's reputation as the "Eleven of the Gasometer" dates back to this period. In 1946, the HSC had to play qualifying matches for a place in the Oberliga Niedersachsen-Süd against the local rival Werder Hannover, which the HSC lost. Three years later, they belonged to the founding members of the Amateuroberliga Niedersachsen-West. After they had to transfer to the eastern division in 1951, they were promptly relegated. At this time, financial worries plagued the association. According to legend, the treasurer of the club fled with the income from a friendly match against Arminia Hannover to save the money from the bailiff.

In 1956, the HSC won the Amateurliga Hannover and managed to be promoted to the second-tier Amateuroberliga. They did not get past midfield positions or relegation matches. By the league reform of 1964, the new Verbandsliga was missed, before being relegated back to the Bezirksliga in 1969. Under the leadership of coach Werner Müller, they were promoted in 1970 to the Verbandsliga Süd. There they were runners-up after losing 0–2 to Preußen Hameln in Stadthagen. In 1972, the championship was won and the HSC made it into the then third-tier Landesliga Niedersachsen. With Volker Finke, a future Bundesliga coach played for the HSC team. In the Lower Saxony top-tier league they played against relegation. In 1974, relegation was avoided in second-to-last place only because three teams were promoted into the Oberliga Nord.

For three years, they fought against relegation with a young team, before being relegated in 1977. One year later, the HSC was passed through to the Bezirksliga with only five points and 104 conceded goals. In 1991, the HSC was promoted to the Landesliga West and three years later they qualified for the Niedersachsenliga West. In the 1995–96 season, the HSC had chances of promotion to the Oberliga, but only finished third at the end of the season. Two years later, the team was relegated from the Niedersachsenliga and was promptly passed on down to the Bezirksliga. In 2012, the team lost their promotion to the Landesliga to TuS Kleefeld with a 1–1 draw on the last matchday; promotion was achieved in the following season. In 2016, the HSC secured its promotion to the Oberliga Niedersachsen two matchdays before the end of the season, but were relegated after only one year. In 2018, the HSC was able to directly rejoin the Oberliga before being promoted to the fourth-tier Regionalliga Nord one year later.

== Honours ==
- Oberliga Niedersachsen
  - Champions: 2019
- Landesliga Hannover
  - Champions: 1991, 2016, 2018
- Amateurliga Hannover
  - Champions: 1956
- Hannover District Cup
  - Champions: 1995

== Current squad ==
As of 8 September 2026

Note: Flags indicate national team as defined under FIFA eligibility rules; some limited exceptions apply. Players may hold more than one non-FIFA nationality.

No.	Pos.	Nation	Player
1	GK	GER	Bastian Fielsch
2	DF	GER	Lukas Schorler
3	DF	GER	Paul Wegner
4	DF	GER	Fabian Weigel
5	DF	GER	Moritz Dittmann
6	MF	GER	Leander Baar
7	FW	GER	Evren Serbes
8	DF	GER	Jonas Röhrbein
9	FW	GER	Finn Hoffmann
10	MF	GER	Denis Vukančić
11	FW	GER	Mehmet Özin
12	GK	GER	Paris Pechlevanoudis
13	DF	GER	Younes Otte
14	MF	GER	Marcel Langer
15	FW	GER	John Michael Ferreras

No.	Pos.	Nation	Player
16	MF	GER	Tom Hausmann
18	MF	GER	Tino Amberg
19	FW	GER	Amara Diedhiou
20	DF	GER	Ömar Sever
21	MF	GER	Yannik Pohlmann
22	MF	GER	Tyrice Linne
23	MF	GER	Jonas Lübke
24	MF	GER	Ant Yel
25	DF	GER	Lukas Dominke
26	MF	GER	Pirmin Kläne-Menke
27	MF	GER	Finn Straube
28	MF	GER	Lasse von Boetticher
29	GK	GER	Pascal Geerts
-	FW	GER	Bennet Winter
