= Atlas Delmenhorst =

German football club

- Full name: Sportverein Atlas Delmenhorst e.V.
- Founded: 13 July 1973 (original club) 4 April 2012 (reformed)
- Ground: Stadion an der Düsternortstraße
- Capacity: 12,000
- Chairman: Nikola Petkovski
- Manager: Key Riebau
- League: Regionalliga Nord (IV)
- 2025–26: Oberliga Niedersachsen 1st of 16 (promoted)
- Website: https://www.svatlas.de
Home colours	Away colours

Atlas Delmenhorst is a German association football club from the city of Delmenhorst, Lower Saxony, playing in the fourth-tier Regionalliga Nord.

The club, originally formed with a merger in 1973, discontinued in 2002 after declaring insolvency but was reformed a decade later in 2012. The club's previous greatest success was to play in the Regionalliga Nord, then at tier three level, for three seasons from 1995. The club has also made three appearances in the DFB-Pokal, first in 1980–81 and then twice again, after reforming, in 2019–20 and 2025–26, the latter a spirited 3–2 loss to Borussia Mönchengladbach.

== History ==
SV Atlas Delmenhorst was formed on 13 July 1973 when three local Delmenhorst clubs, FC Roland, VSK Bungerhof and SSV Delmenhorst, merged with the support of local building equipment manufacturer Atlas Weyhausen GmbH. The new club took up the stadium of SSV, built in 1930, the Stadion an der Düsternortstraße, as its home ground as FC Roland's was too small and VSK neither had a football team nor a stadium.

The new club quickly rose through the league system, winning promotion to the tier four Landesliga Niedersachsen in 1975. Atlas won this league as a freshly promoted side and moved up to the tier three Oberliga Nord for the 1976–77 season. The club played for six seasons in the league until 1983 when an eighteenth-place finish meant relegation again. In between the club finished as high as fourth place in the league in 1979–80. It also made a single appearance in the DFB-Pokal for 1980–81, reaching the fourth round, eliminating 2. Bundesliga sides Rot-Weiß Oberhausen and Kickers Offenbach on the way before being knocked-out by Borussia Mönchengladbach.

Atlas was back in the highest league of Lower Saxony, the tier four Verbandsliga, from 1983 to 1986, taking out league titles in 1984 and 1986. It failed to win promotion to the Oberliga in 1984 but succeeded in 1986. After two difficult Oberliga seasons the club was relegated back to the Verbandsliga in 1988. The club struggled for a number of seasons in the Verbandsliga and came close to relegation but recovered and finished runners-up in 1992 and 1994. The latter qualified the club for the new Oberliga Niedersachsen/Bremen when the Regionalliga Nord was established as the new third tier in Northern Germany and the Oberliga Nord was replaced by two regional leagues.

Atlas finished runners-up in the new Oberliga in 1995 and won promotion to the Regionalliga. The club struggled in the league for next three seasons, never finished above twelfth place and got relegated again in 1998. Back in the Oberliga the club came thirteenth in 1999. With the loss of support from long-term sponsor Atlas Weyhausen the fortunes of the club declined. It played three more seasons in the western division of the Verbandsliga Niedersachsen and was renamed to Delmenhorster SC in October 1999. It came last in the league in 2001–02 and had to declare insolvency, being eventually stricken from the register of clubs. On 10 June 2002, Eintracht Delmenhorst was formed to take over and continue the youth department of Atlas, with the latter de-registered.

On 4 April 2012, the football department of Eintracht Delmenhorst split from the club to form the new Atlas Delmenhorst club, taking over Eintracht's league place. Atlas won promotion from the Kreisliga to the tier seven Bezirksliga in 2013–14, where it played for two seasons until a league championship took it up to the Landesliga. In the subsequent year the club won the Landesliga Weser-Ems, earning promotion to the Niedersachsen Oberliga.

In 2019, Delmenhorst won the Niedersachsenpokal, a local amateur cup tournament, and thus qualified for the 2019–20 DFB-Pokal. The club was knocked-out in the first round by Werder Bremen.

== Current squad ==
As of 8 September 2026

Note: Flags indicate national team as defined under FIFA eligibility rules; some limited exceptions apply. Players may hold more than one non-FIFA nationality.

No.	Pos.	Nation	Player
1	GK	GER	Damian Schobert
2	DF	GER	Ryan Schröder
3	DF	GER	André Ndiaye
4	DF	ARG	Alejo Sánchez Romero
5	DF	GER	Ibrahim Temin
6	DF	UKR	Yehor Melenivskyi
7	MF	GER	Fin Tiedeken
8	MF	NED	Dinand Gijsen
9	FW	FIN	Tobias Fagerström
10	MF	NED	Chris David
11	MF	GER	Marcel Raßmann
14	FW	GER	Lamine Diop
16	MF	GER	Marcel Marquart
18	DF	GER	Tom Berling

No.	Pos.	Nation	Player
19	DF	GER	Timon Widiker
20	MF	GER	Lucas Bauer
21	MF	GER	Max Herrmann
22	DF	GER	Linus Urban
23	FW	GER	Tungay Sengör
24	MF	GER	Mats Kaiser
25	MF	GER	Niklas Tepe
26	GK	GER	Kilian Sanden
27	MF	SYR	Yehya Alalami
28	FW	GER	Steffen Rohwedder
29	DF	GER	Eric Anozie
30	DF	GER	Marlo Siech
33	GK	GER	Julian Walker
36	FW	GER	Amin Muja

== Honours ==
=== League ===
- Oberliga Niedersachsen/Bremen
  - Runners-up: 1995
- Oberliga Niedersachsen
  - Champions: 2026
- Verbandsliga Niedersachsen
  - Champions: (3) 1976, 1984, 1986
  - Runners-up: (2) 1992, 1994
- Bezirksliga Weser-Ems 2
  - Champions: 2016
- Landesliga Weser-Ems
  - Champions: 2017

== Recent seasons ==
The recent season-by-season performance of the club:

Year	Division	Tier	Position
1994–95	Oberliga Niedersachsen/Bremen	IV	2nd ↑
1995–96	Regionalliga Nord	III	14th
1996–97	Regionalliga Nord	III	12th
1997–98	Regionalliga Nord	III	17th ↓
1998–99	Oberliga Niedersachsen/Bremen	IV	13th ↓
1999–2000	Niedersachsenliga West	V	6th
2000–01	Niedersachsenliga West	V	9th
2001–02	Niedersachsenliga West	V	19th
2002–2012	defunct		
2012–13	Kreisklasse Oldenburg	IX	2nd ↑
2013–14	Kreisliga Oldenburg	VIII	2nd ↑
2014–15	Bezirksliga Weser-Ems 2	VII	2nd
2015–16	Bezirksliga Weser-Ems 2	VII	1st ↑
2016–17	Landesliga Weser-Ems	VI	1st ↑
2017–18	Oberliga Niedersachsen	V	9th
2018–19	Oberliga Niedersachsen	V	10th
2019–20	Oberliga Niedersachsen	V	2nd ↑
2020–21	Regionalliga Nord – Süd	IV	11th
2021–22	Regionalliga Nord – Süd	IV	8th
2022–23	Regionalliga Nord – Süd	IV	18th ↓
2023–24	Oberliga Niedersachsen	V	3rd
2024–25	Oberliga Niedersachsen	V	3rd
2025–26	Oberliga Niedersachsen	V	1st ↑
2026–27	Regionalliga Nord	IV	

- With the introduction of the Regionalligas in 1994 and the 3. Liga in 2008 as the new third tier, below the 2. Bundesliga, all leagues below dropped one tier.

↑ Promoted	↓ Relegated
