= Christian Jürgensen =

German footballer (born 1985)

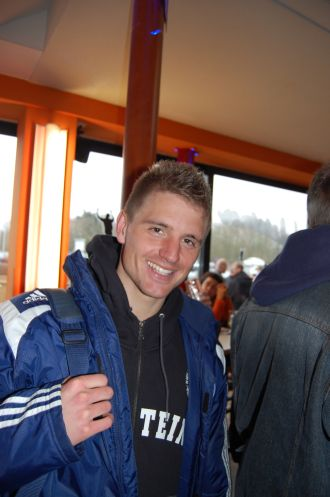
- Jürgensen in 2009

Personal information
- Date of birth: 6 April 1985 (age 41)
- Place of birth: Flensburg, West Germany
- Height: 1.86 m (6 ft 1 in)
- Position: Centre-back

Team information
- Current team: Weiche Flensburg (managing director)

Youth career
- Höruper SC
- SSV Schafflund
- TSB Flensburg
- –2004: DGF Flensborg

Senior career*
Years	Team	Apps	(Gls)
2004–2006	Flensburg 08		
2006–2011	Holstein Kiel II	18	(1)
2006–2013	Holstein Kiel	141	(7)
2013–2020	Weiche Flensburg	166	(22)

Managerial career
- 2020–: Weiche Flensburg (managing director)
- * Club domestic league appearances and goals

Christian Jürgensen (born 6 April 1985) is a German former footballer who played as a centre-back.
