= BV Cloppenburg =

German football club

- Full name: Ballspielverein Cloppenburg e. V.
- Nickname: BVC
- Founded: 1919
- Ground: Stadion an der Friesoyther Strasse
- Capacity: 5001
- Chairman: Bernhard Dorissen
- Manager: Imke Wübbenhorst
- League: Landesliga Weser/Ems (VI)
- 2019/20: 11th
Home colours	Away colours

BV Cloppenburg is a German association football club located in Cloppenburg, Lower Saxony.

== History ==
The club was founded after World War I in 1919 as the successor to SV Cloppenburg 1911. Through the 1950s they played in the Amateurliga Niedersachsen-West (II), and in the 1960s in the Verbandsliga Niedersachsen West (III), before falling out of sight in the early-1970s to become an obscure local side. In recent years, BV managed to rise as high as the third division Regionalliga Nord in 1998 for a couple of seasons, before falling back to the Oberliga Niedersachsen/Bremen (IV).

After four seasons in the Regionalliga Nord (IV) Cloppenburg was relegated back to the Oberliga at the end of the 2015–16 season.

The club won their first DFB-Pokal berth in the 2006–07 tournament by way of a Niedersachsen Cup win the previous season over third division side VfL Osnabrück. They were eliminated from the competition in the first round after losing 1–0 to Bundesliga side 1. FC Nürnberg at home.

== Stadium ==
Cloppenburg plays its home games in the Stadion an der Friesoyther Strasse (now named TimePartner Arena) which has a capacity of 6,000 (~2,000 seats). Work on improving the venue by expanding it was recently undertaken, and the installation of floodlights is being considered.

== Honours ==
The club's honours:

- Oberliga Niedersachsen/Bremen
  - Champions: 1995
- Verbandsliga Niedersachsen
  - Champions: 1993
- Lower Saxony Cup
  - Winners: 2006

== Former managers ==
- Franz Gerber
- Wolfgang Steinbach
- Hubert Hüring
- Tom Saintfiet
- Jörg Uwe Klütz
- Alexander Woloschin
- Jörg Goslar
