= Landesliga Weser-Ems =

- Founded: 1979
- Country: Germany
- State: Lower Saxony
- Number of clubs: 18
- Level on pyramid: Level 6
- Promotion to: Oberliga Niedersachsen
- Relegation to: Bezirksliga Weser-Ems 1-5
- Current champions: SV Holthausen/Biene (2025–26)

The Landesliga Weser-Ems, called the Bezirksoberliga Weser-Ems from 1979 to 1994 and 2006 to 2010, is the sixth tier of the German football league system and the second highest league in the German state of Lower Saxony (German:Niedersachsen). It covers the region of the now defunct Regierungsbezirk Weser-Ems.

It is one of four leagues at this level in Lower Saxony, the other three being the Landesliga Lüneburg, the Landesliga Hannover and the Landesliga Braunschweig.

The term Landesliga can be translated as State league.

== Overview ==
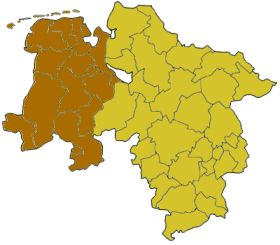
Map of Lower Saxony:Position of the Weser-Ems region highlighted

The league's history goes back to 1979, when four new Bezirksoberligas (Braunschweig, Hannover, Lüneburg and Weser-Ems) were formed in the state of Lower Saxony. The Bezirksoberligas (6th tier) were set below the Verbandsliga Niedersachsen (4th tier) and the two Landesligas (5th tier) in the German football league system. In 1994, the two old Landesligas were dissolved, while the four Bezirksoberligas were renamed into Landesliga Braunschweig, Landesliga Hannover, Landesliga Lüneburg, and Landesliga Weser-Ems respectively. Due to the introduction of the new Regionalliga (IV) the new Landesligas still remained at the 6th tier of German football, however.

In 2006, the Landesliga was renamed into Bezirksoberliga again. The new Bezirksoberliga Weser-Ems was made up of sixteen clubs, three from the tier-five Verbandsliga Niedersachsen-West, nine from the Landesliga and two each from the two Bezirksligas. The league was formed in a reorganisation of the league system in Lower Saxony, whereby the four regional Landsligas were replaced by the Bezirksoberligas. Below these, the number of Bezirksligas was increased. In Weser-Ems, the two Bezirksligas were expanded to five, while the other three regions operate with four Bezirksligas at this level.

The Bezirksoberliga, like the Landesliga before, was set in the league system below the Verbandsliga and above the now five Bezirksligas, which were numbered from one to five. The winner of the Bezirksoberliga was directly promoted to the Verbandsliga, while the bottom placed teams, in a varying number, were relegated to the Bezirksliga. The Bezirksoberligas of Weser-Ems and Hanover form the tier below the Verbandsliga West, while those of Lüneburg and Braunschweig form the tier below the eastern division of the Verbandsliga.

In the leagues first season, 2006–07, the runners-up of the league, SV Holthausen-Biene, had to play-off with the runners-up of the Bezirksoberliga Hannover, TSV Stelingen, a game they lost 1-0 and thereby failed to gain promotion. In the following two seasons, only the league champions were eligible for promotion.

At the end of the 2007-08 season, with the introduction of the 3. Liga, the Verbandsliga was renamed Oberliga Niedersachsen-West. For the Bezirksoberliga, this had no direct consequences, but the league was increased to eighteen clubs.

After the 2009-10 season, the two Oberligas (English: Premier league) in Lower Saxony were merged to one single division. The four Bezirksoberliga champions that season were not automatically promoted, instead they had to compete with the four teams placed ninth and tenth in the Oberliga for four more spots in this league.

On 17 May 2010, the Lower Saxony football association decided to rename the four Bezirksoberligas to Landesligas from 1 July 2010. This change in name came alongside the merger of the two Oberliga divisions above it into the Oberliga Niedersachsen.

== Champions ==
=== Bezirksoberliga Weser-Ems 1979–1994 ===
- 1980: VfL Ockenhausen
- 1981: SV Wilhelmshaven
- 1982: Blau-Weiß Schinkel
- 1983: Weiße Elf Nordhorn
- 1984: VfL Oldenburg
- 1985: SpVg Aurich
- 1986: SV Bad Bentheim
- 1987: TuS Heidkrug
- 1988: SC Spelle-Venhaus
- 1989: Sportfreunde Oesede
- 1990: Olympia Laxten
- 1991: VfB Oldenburg Am.
- 1992: VfL Germania Leer
- 1993: FC Schüttorf 09
- 1994: SV Concordia Ihrhove

=== Landesliga Weser-Ems 1994–2006 ===
- 1995: SV Bad Rothenfelde
- 1996: Sparta Werlte
- 1997: SV Meppen Am.
- 1998: VfL Osnabrück II
- 1999: TuRa Grönenberg Melle
- 2000: VfL Germania Leer
- 2001: TuS Bersenbrück
- 2002: TuS Pewsum
- 2003: VfL Germania Leer
- 2004: VfL Oldenburg
- 2005: VfL Germania Leer
- 2006: SV Wilhelmshaven II

=== Bezirksoberliga Weser-Ems 2006–2010 ===
Season	Champions	Runners-up	Third
2006–07	**Germania Leer**	SV Holthausen/Biene	VfL Löningen
2007–08	**SV Bad Rothenfelde**	SV Brake	VfL Oythe
2008–09	**VfL Oythe**	Vorwärts Nordhorn	SC Spelle-Venhaus
2009–10	FC Schüttorf 09	SC BW Papenburg	SC Melle 03

=== Landesliga Weser-Ems 2010–present ===
Season	Champions	Runners-up	Third
2010–11	**SV Holthausen/Biene**	SSV Jeddeloh	SV Bad Rothenfelde
2011–12	**SSV Jeddeloh**	SC Melle 03	VfL Oldenburg
2012–13	**VfL Oldenburg**	Blau-Weiß Hollage	SV Bad Rothenfelde
2013–14	**SC Spelle-Venhaus**	SV Holthausen/Biene	SV Bad Rothenfelde
2014–15	**TuS Lingen**	VfL Oythe	Kickers Emden
2015–16	**TuS Bersenbrück**	TSV Oldenburg	SV Bad Rothenfelde
2016–17	**Atlas Delmenhorst**	Blau-Weiß Lohne	SC Melle 03
2017–18	**VfL Oythe**	Kickers Emden	TV Dinklage
2018–19	SV Bevern	**Kickers Emden**	Blau-Weiß Lohne
2019–20	**Blau-Weiß Lohne**	SC Melle 03	SV Holthausen/Biene
2020–21	Season curtailed and annulled by COVID-19 pandemic in Germany		
2021–22	**Blau-Weiß Papenburg**	SV Bevern	SV Hansa Friesoythe
2022–23	**SV Meppen II**	SV Holthausen/Biene	SV Wilhelmshaven
2023–24	**SV Wilhelmshaven**	SV Holthausen/Biene	SC Melle 03
2024–25	**SV Holthausen/Biene**	Blau-Weiß Papenburg	Vorwärts Nordhorn

- Promoted teams in **bold**.
