= Oberliga Niedersachsen =

Football league in Lower Saxony, Germany

Niedersachsenliga
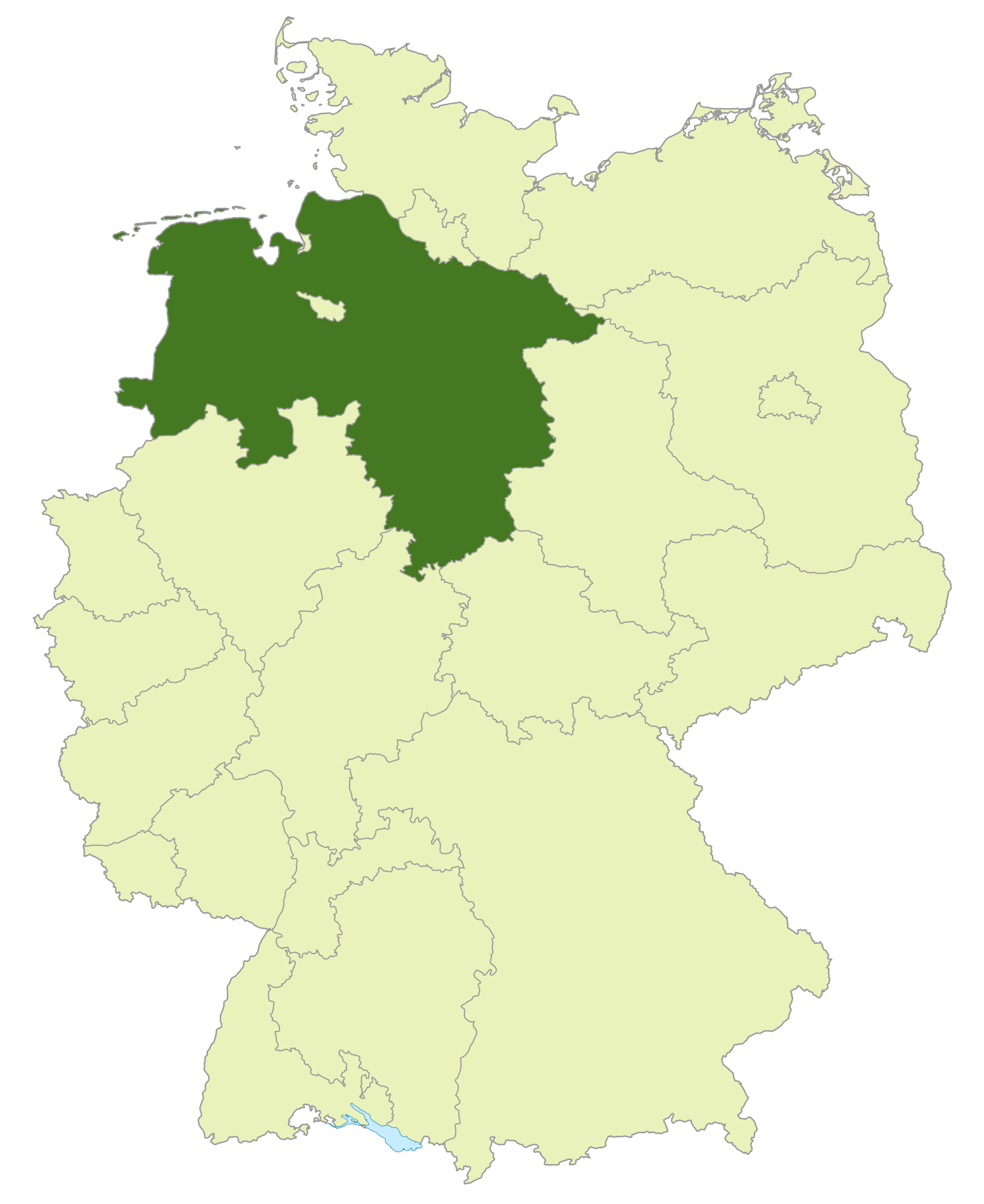
- Founded: 1947
- Country: Germany
- State: Lower Saxony
- Number of clubs: 18
- Level on pyramid: Level 5
- Promotion to: Regionalliga Nord
- Relegation to: LL Braunschweig; LL Lüneburg; LL Hannover; LL Weser-Ems
- Current champions: HSC Hannover (2025–26 Oberliga Niedersachsen)
- Current: 2026–27 Oberliga Niedersachsen

The Oberliga Niedersachsen (English: Upper League Lower Saxony), sometimes referred to as Niedersachsenliga (Lower Saxony league), is the fifth tier of the German football league system and the highest league in the German state of Lower Saxony (German: Niedersachsen). Since 1994, the league was split into a western and an eastern group. In 2010, it returned to a single-division format. The Oberliga moved to a north-south split for one season in 2020. It is one of fourteen Oberligen in German football, the fifth tier of the German football league system.

== Overview ==
=== 1947–1963 ===
The league was formed as Landesliga Niedersachsen in 1947, operating with four divisions in variable strength, all up with 42 clubs. The four regional divisions were named after the capital city of the district, being Hanover, Hildesheim, Braunschweig and Osnabrück. Additionally, some clubs from Lower Saxony also played in the Amateurliga Bremen, a trend that continues to a lesser degree even today. The state of Lower Saxony had only recently then been formed in the British occupation zone and the status of the Free Hanseatic City of Bremen as an independent German state had not been fully confirmed yet.

From the start, the Landesliga Niedersachsen was a feeder league to the Oberliga Nord which its champion had the option of promotion to. Promotion had to be achieved through a play-off with teams from the Amateurligen of Bremen, Hamburg and Schleswig-Holstein. As such, the league was the second tier of the northern German league system.

In 1949, the four Landesligen were disbanded in favor of the two new Amateuroberligen, the Amateuroberliga Niedersachsen-West and the Amateuroberliga Niedersachsen-Ost. The western division started with sixteen, the eastern with eighteen clubs. The majority of clubs previously playing in the Bremen leagues also returned to the Lower Saxony league system. Below the Amateuroberligen, eight Amateurligen were established. This system remained as such unchanged until 1964.

The two leagues continued to exchange clubs to balance out promotion and relegation but did not play out a Niedersachsen champion as such since promotion was decided between these two leagues and the other three northern German leagues. Especially the clubs from Hanover were frequently transferred between divisions.

After the first couple of seasons went with ever-changing club numbers in the two leagues, reaching a peak of twenty, by 1954 both leagues had arrived at sixteen clubs each, which they maintained for most of the coming seasons.

=== 1963–1974 ===
In 1963, with the introduction of the Bundesliga, the disbanding of the Oberliga Nord and the formation of the Regionalliga Nord, the leagues fell to tier three, but initially remained unchanged otherwise. The champions of the Niedersachsen leagues continued to have to play-off for promotion, now to the Regionalliga, with the same opposition as before.

The year 1964 saw the creation of a single-division highest league for Niedersachsen. Eight clubs from the western group, seven from the eastern group, one team from the Regionalliga and two promoted teams made up the new Amateurliga Niedersachsen. Promotion however still had to be achieved through a promotion round with the other northern German champions.

Below the Amateurliga, four new Verbandsligen were established, North, South, East and West, with their champions directly promoted and four clubs relegated from the eighteen-team Amateurliga.

The late 1960s and early 1970s saw the oddity of fourth and fifth placed teams being promoted. The reasons for this were the fact that Lower Saxony, as the strongest association in northern Germany was permitted to send more than one team to the promotion round and the high finishes of reserve teams of the likes of Hannover 96, Arminia Hannover and Eintracht Braunschweig in the league, which were ineligible to enter the promotion rounds.

The league strength for most of these season stood at sixteen clubs.

=== 1974–1994 ===
After the 1973–74 season, the Regionalliga Nord was disbanded in favor of the 2nd Bundesliga Nord. The new Oberliga Nord was now introduced in northern Germany, as the third tier of the league system, below the 2nd Bundesliga. This meant for the Amateurliga a slip to tier four. The top three teams of the league were however promoted to the new Oberliga and the Amateurliga was renamed Landesliga Niedersachsen. The system for promotion from the Landesliga remained mostly unchanged and the league continued to operate on sixteen clubs.

For the first time, reserve teams were also eligible for promotion from the Niedersachsen league and Eintracht Braunschweig II became the first team to do so in 1975.

In 1979, the league changed its name once more, now becoming the Verbandsliga Niedersachsen, but remaining unchanged otherwise.

=== 1994–2008 ===
In 1994, the Regionalliga Nord was re-established, now as the third tier of the league system. The Oberliga Nord was in turn replaced by two parallel Oberligen, Niedersachsen/Bremen and Hamburg/Schleswig-Holstein. For the Verbandsliga Niedersachsen, this meant a further slip, now to tier five, and a split to two separate divisions again, but also, for the first time in its history, direct promotion for the league champions.

While the first and third placed team from the 1993-94 season gained entry to the new Regionalliga, the other twelve clubs of the top-fourteen were promoted to the Oberliga Niedersachsen/Bremen. Only the bottom five teams of the field of nineteen of that season actually remained in the Verbandsligen.

The first season of the new separated leagues saw a strong imbalance of clubs, West operated on sixteen, East on twenty-one teams. The year after, both run on a strength of sixteen.

The 1999–2000 season saw another league system change with the reduction of numbers of Regionalligen, this however had only one effect on the Verbandsligen, no direct promotion was available this year.

In 2004, it was decided to restore the Oberliga Nord in favor of the two separate Oberligen.

=== 2008–2010 ===
At the end of the 2007–08 season, the new 3. Liga was established and the Oberliga Nord disbanded, again. The four northern German states were then the only region without an Oberliga and the five Verbandsligen sat right below the Regionalliga Nord, parallel to the two NOFV-Oberligas. At the end of the 2007-08 season, the five winners of the northern Verbandsligen played with the sixth placed team from the Oberliga Nord for one last spot in the Regionalliga. In the following seasons, promotion for the Niedersachsenliga winners was only available through a decider between the two champions. These two teams competed for one promotion spot to the Regionalliga. The Niedersachsen-Liga however maintained their status as tier five leagues and accordingly was renamed Oberliga Niedersachsen.

=== 2010 onwards ===
The 2009–10 season functioned as a qualifying stage for the new single-division Niedersachsenliga, which kick-off in 2010. While the Lower Saxony champion was promoted to the Regionalliga, as in the previous season, the other fifteen teams placed one to eight in the two leagues were directly qualify for the new league. The four teams placed ninth and tenth took part in a qualifying round with the four Bezirksoberliga champions. In two groups of four, the top-two of each group also qualified for the new league. The teams placed eleventh or lower in the Oberligen in 2009–10 were automatically relegated.

The new single-division Niedersachsenliga consisted of 20 clubs in its first season and then 18 thereafter, also fluctuation due to relegation/promotion to and from the Regionalliga are possible.

At the end of the 2011–12 season, the top four clubs, being the Goslarer SC, BV Cloppenburg, VfB Oldenburg and BSV Schwarz-Weiß Rehden, were directly promoted to the Regionalliga Nord while the sixth placed club, SV Holthausen/Biene, unsuccessfully entered a promotion playoff with the runners-up from the Oberliga Hamburg and Schleswig-Holstein-Liga. Fifth placed VfL Osnabrück II was ineligible for promotion to the Regionalliga as it is the reserve side of a 3. Liga team.

== Position of the Oberliga Niedersachsen in the league system ==
Years	Tier	Promotion to
1947–63	II	Oberliga Nord
1963–74	III	Regionalliga Nord
1974–94	IV	Oberliga Nord
1994–2004	V	Oberliga Niedersachsen/Bremen
2004–08	V	Oberliga Nord
2008–	V	Regionalliga Nord

Source: "Verbandsliga Niedersachsen". Das deutsche Fussball-Archiv.

== Winners of the Niedersachsenligen ==
=== Landesliga Niedersachsen ===
Season	Staffel Braunschweig	Staffel Hildesheim	Staffel Hannover	Staffel Osnabrück
1947–48	MTV Braunschweig	**Göttingen 05**	Teutonia Uelzen	Eintracht Osnabrück
1948–49	Rot-Weiß Braunschweig	SV Hameln 07	SV Linden 07	**VfB Oldenburg**

- Due to irregularities in the previous season, Hannover 96 was also promoted in 1949.

=== Amateuroberligen Niedersachsen West and Ost ===
Season	West	East
1949–50	**Eintracht Osnabrück**	TSV Goslar
1950–51	Kickers Emden	VfR Osterode
1951–52	VfB Oldenburg	VfL Wolfsburg
1952–53	Eintracht Nordhorn	**Eintracht Braunschweig**
1953–54	Eintracht Nordhorn *	**VfL Wolfsburg**
1954–55	**Eintracht Nordhorn**	VfV Hildesheim
1955–56	Olympia Wilhelmshaven	Eintracht Braunschweig II
1956–57	VfB Oldenburg	Union Salzgitter (C)
1957–58	Arminia Hannover	**VfV Hildesheim** (C)
1958–59	VfB Oldenburg *	Arminia Hannover (C)
1959–60	Hannover 96 II (C) *	SC Leu Braunschweig
1960–61	Arminia Hannover *	SC Leu Braunschweig (C)
1961–62	**Arminia Hannover** (C)	SC Leu Braunschweig
1962–63	**VfL Oldenburg**	**VfL Wolfsburg** (C)
1963–64	Olympia Wilhelmshaven	Hannover 96 II (C) *

- (C) denotes club won Lower Saxony championship play–off (played out since 1956–57).
- In 1954, the runner–up VfB Oldenburg was promoted instead.
- In 1959, the runner–up Eintracht Osnabrück was promoted instead.
- In 1960, the runner–up VfB Oldenburg was promoted instead.
- In 1961, the third placed Eintracht Nordhorn was promoted instead.
- In 1964, the runner–up Göttingen 05 was promoted instead.

=== Amateurliga/Landesliga/Verbandsliga Niedersachsen ===
Season	Club
1964–65	Hannover 96 II
1965–66	Hannover 96 II
1966–67	Hannover 96 II
1967–68	SV Meppen
1968–69	**SC Leu Braunschweig**
1969–70	Eintracht Braunschweig II
1970–71	**OSV Hannover**
1971–72	**VfB Oldenburg**
1972–73	Union Salzgitter
1973–74	**Preußen 07 Hameln**
1974–75	VfB Peine
1975–76	**Atlas Delmenhorst**
1976–77	TSV Helmstedt *
1977–78	Germania Leer *
1978–79	**SV Meppen**

Season	Club
1979–80	**Lüneburger SK**
1980–81	TuS Celle
1981–82	**TuS Hessisch–Oldendorf**
1982–83	Blau–Weiß Lohne
1983–84	Atlas Delmenhorst
1984–85	VfL Herzlake
1985–86	Atlas Delmenhorst
1986–87	VfL Herzlake
1987–88	**VfL Herzlake**
1988–89	Kickers Emden
1989–90	**TuS Celle**
1990–91	**Kickers Emden**
1991–92	**TuS Lingen**
1992–93	BV Cloppenburg
1993–94	**SV Wilhelmshaven**

- In 1967, the third placed TuS Haste was promoted instead.
- In 1968, the fourth placed TuS Celle was promoted instead.
- In 1969, the fourth placed Olympia Wilhelmshaven was also promoted.
- In 1970, the fifth placed SV Meppen was promoted instead.
- In 1972, the runner–up SV Meppen was also promoted.
- In 1974, the top three teams were promoted to the new Oberliga Nord, SpVgg Bad Pyrmont and Union Salzgitter were therefore also promoted.
- In 1975, the second and third placed Eintracht Nordhorn and Eintracht Braunschweig II were promoted instead.
- In 1977, the second placed VfB Peine won a play–off for the Lower Saxony championship, neither team was promoted.
- In 1978, the second placed VfB Peine won a play–off for the Lower Saxony championship, neither team was promoted.
- In 1979, the third placed MTV Gifhorn was also promoted.
- In 1981, the third placed TSV Havelse was promoted instead.
- In 1982, the runner–up Olympia Wilhelmshaven was also promoted.
- In 1983, the third placed Eintracht Braunschweig II was promoted instead.
- In 1985, the second and third placed Eintracht Braunschweig II and Wolfenbüttler SV were promoted instead.
- In 1986, the runner–up SpVgg Göttingen was also promoted.
- In 1989, the third placed TuS Esens was promoted instead.
- In 1990, the third placed Eintracht Nordhorn was also promoted.
- In 1993, the runner–up Preußen 07 Hameln was promoted instead.
- In 1994, the top fourteen clubs were all promoted.

=== Verbandsligen Niedersachsen West and Ost ===
Season	West	East
1994–95	**Eintracht Nordhorn**	**SV Südharz Walkenried** (C)
1995–96	**Concordia Ihrhove** (C)	**Wolfenbüttler SV** *
1996–97	**FC Schüttorf**	**SpVgg Einbeck** (C) *
1997–98	**Blau–Weiß Lohne**	**MTV Gifhorn** (C)
1998–99	**FC Schüttorf**	**VfL Wolfsburg II** (C)
1999–2000	**Hannover 96 II**	Eintracht Braunschweig II (C)
2000–01	**SC Langenhagen** (C)	**SpVgg Einbeck**
2001–02	**VfV Hildesheim**	**Eintracht Braunschweig II** (C)
2002–03	**Hannover 96 II** (C)	**SSV Vorsfelde**
2003–04	VfL Osnabrück II (C)	TSV Neuenkirchen
2004–05	**VfL Osnabrück II** (C)	**Eintracht Braunschweig II**
2005–06	**SV Ramlingen–Ehlershausen** (C)	**VSK Osterholz Scharmbeck**
2006–07	**VfB Oldenburg**	**TuS Heeslingen** (C)
2007–08	VfL Oldenburg	MTV Gifhorn (C)

Source: "Verbandsliga Niedersachsen". Das deutsche Fussball-Archiv.

- **Bold** denotes club gained promotion.
- (C) denotes club won Lower Saxony championship play–off.
- In 1996, the runner-up SSV Vorsfelde was also promoted.
- In 1997, the runner-up Rotenburger SV was also promoted.

=== Oberligen Niedersachsen West and Ost ===
Season	West	East
2008–09	VfB Oldenburg	**Goslarer SC 08** (C)
2009–10	**TSV Havelse**	**Eintracht Braunschweig II** (C)

- **Bold** denotes club gained promotion.
- (C) denotes club won Lower Saxony championship play–off.
- In 2010 both champions gained promotion as none of the champions from the Bremen-Liga, Hamburg-Liga and Schleswig-Holstein-Liga applied for a Regionalliga licence.

=== Oberliga Niedersachsen ===
Season	Champions	Runners–up
2010–11	**SV Meppen**	BV Cloppenburg
2011–12	**Goslarer SC 08**	**BV Cloppenburg**
2012–13	**Eintracht Braunschweig II**	Lupo Martini Wolfsburg
2013–14	**Lüneburger SK Hansa**	**FT Braunschweig**
2014–15	**SV Drochtersen/Assel**	**VfV 06 Hildesheim**
2015–16	**Lupo Martini Wolfsburg**	**Germania Egestorf/L.**
2016–17	**SSV Jeddeloh**	Eintracht Northeim
2017–18	**Lupo Martini Wolfsburg**	**VfL Oldenburg**
2018–19	**HSC Hannover**	Eintracht Northeim
2019–20	**VfV 06 Hildesheim**	**Atlas Delmenhorst**
2020–21	Heeslinger SC	SC Spelle-Venhaus
2021–22	**Blau-Weiß Lohne**	**Kickers Emden**
2022–23	**SC Spelle-Venhaus**	Lupo Martini Wolfsburg
2023–24	**Kickers Emden**	TuS Bersenbrück
2024–25	**HSC Hannover**	**FSV Schöningen**
2025–26	**Atlas Delmenhorst**	Germania Egestorf/L.

- **Bold** denotes club gained promotion.
- In 2012, VfB Oldenburg and BSV Schwarz–Weiß Rehden were also promoted.
- In 2021, there was no promotion after the season was curtailed during the COVID-19 pandemic in Germany. Teams were placed according to points per game.

== League placings ==
The complete list of clubs and placings in the league since introduction of the single-division Oberliga (2010–2020, 2022–present); in 2021, placings were based on points per game in the overall table after the Oberliga split into two groups again:

Club	11	12	13	14	15	16	17	18	19	20	21	22	23	24	25
SV Meppen	1	R	R	R	R	R	R	3L	3L	3L	3L	3L	3L	R	R
VfB Oldenburg	6	3	R	R	R	R	R	R	R	R	R	R	3L	R	R
SV Drochtersen/Assel	17		5	6	1	R	R	R	R	R	R	R	R	R	R
SSV Jeddeloh			8	10	3	3	1	R	R	R	R	R	R	R	R
Blau-Weiß Lohne											3	1	R	R	R
Kickers Emden ^{5}	3	18								8	7	2	R	1	R
HSC Hannover							15		1	R	R	R	12		1
FSV Schöningen													5	13	2
Atlas Delmenhorst								9	10	2	R	R	R	3	3
TuS Bersenbrück							8	5	5	9	18	13	4	2	4
SC Spelle-Venhaus					6	5	3	3	3	5	2	3	1	R	5
Heeslinger SC						13	6	8	8	6	1	5	6	11	6
SV Meppen II														9	7
VfV 06 Hildesheim	5	12	10	8	2	R	R	R	7	1	R	R	R	5	8
Schwarz-Weiß Rehden	8	4	R	R	R	R	R	R	R	R	R	R	R	7	9
Lupo-Martini Wolfsburg			2	3	7	1	R	1	R	12	6	7	2	4	10
SV Wilhelmshaven															11
Germania Egestorf			6	5	4	2	R	R	R	4	4	4	3	6	12
Eintracht Braunschweig II^{1}	R	8	1	R	R	R	R	R	4						13
FC Verden 04															14
SSV Vorsfelde								13						8	15
MTV Eintracht Celle								15		7	19	11	8	12	16
Arminia Hannover	15				10	10	11	7	6	11	13	9	11	14	17
VfL Oldenburg				12	13	9	9	2	R	3	8	6	7	10	18
Rotenburger SV		16	13	13	15						16	12	9	15	
SV Ramlingen-Ehlershausen	18										5	8	10	16	
STK Eilvese														17	
Blau-Weiß Bornreihe							16							18	
TSV Pattensen													13		
MTV Gifhorn							7	12	13	10	9	14	14		
SV Ahlerstedt/Ottendorf													15		
Lüneburger SK Hansa	13	11	3	1	R	R	R	R	R	R	R	R	16		
FT Braunschweig				2	R	7	14			13	20	10	17		
SC Blau-Weiß Papenburg													18		
MTV Wolfenbüttel									11	17	14	15			
SVG Göttingen 07						6	12	16			11	16			
TB Uphusen				9	11	14	13	10	12	15	12	17			
HSC BW Tündern										18	10	18			
Eintracht Northeim	16				5	3	2	6	2	16	15	19			
FC Hagen/Uthlede									9	14	17	20			
1. FC Wunstorf				7	8	12	5	3	14						
VfL Oythe									15						
BV Cloppenburg	2	2	R	R	R	R	10	11	16						
TuS Sulingen								14							
VfL Osnabrück II^{2}	3	5	7	3	9	8	3								
Goslarer SC 08	7	1	R	R	R	R									
TuS Lingen^{3}						11									
VfL Bückeburg		14	12	15		15									
Teutonia Uelzen	19				12	16									
TSV Ottersberg	12	9	14	11	14										
1. SC Göttingen 05		13	9	14	16										
TuS Celle FC			15	16											
TuS Heeslingen ^{4}	14	7	3												
SV Holthausen/Biene		6	11												
SC Langenhagen	10	10	16												
VSK Osterholz-Scharmbeck	11	15													
Eintracht Nordhorn ^{5}	9	17													
TuS Güldenstern Stade	20														

- ^{1} Eintracht Braunschweig II was withdrawn after the 2018–19 season.
- ^{2} VfL Osnabrück II was withdrawn after the 2016–17 season and it folded.
- ^{3} TuS Lingen declared insolvency in 2016 and withdrew from the league.
- ^{4} TuS Heeslingen declared insolvency in 2013 and folded, with a new club, Heeslinger SC, being formed in its place.
- ^{5} Eintracht Nordhorn and Kickers Emden declared insolvency during the 2011–12 season and were relegated.

=== Key ===
Symbol	Key
B	Bundesliga
2B	2. Bundesliga
3L	3. Liga
R	Regionalliga Nord
1	League champions
Place	League
Blank	Played at a league level below this league
