= FT Braunschweig =

German sports club

- Full name: Freie Turnerschaft Braunschweig e. V.
- Nickname: Die Turner
- Founded: 2 September 1903
- Ground: Prinzenparkstadion
- Capacity: 3,500
- Manager: Stefan Riedel
- League: Landesliga Braunschweig (VI)
- 2017–18: 3rd
Home colours	Away colours

Freie Turnerschaft Braunschweig, commonly known as Freie Turner, FT Braunschweig or simply FTB, is a German association football and sports club based in Braunschweig, Lower Saxony.

== History ==
The club was founded as a worker's sports club on 2 September 1903. In 1913, the club was declared a leftist political organization by the authorities of the German Empire and dissolved. A new club, Neue Freie Turnerschaft Braunschweig, was formed shortly after. The Neue Freie Turnerschaft had to disband again in 1933 because of financial problems, caused by the construction of a new stadium for the club. Its successor Freier Sportverein Braunschweig was formed in January 1933, but shortly after, in March 1933, banned as a socialist club by the new Nazi government. The club was refounded after World War II under its original name.

In 1952 the club was promoted into the second tier Amateuroberliga Niedersachsen-Ost. The stint proved short and FTB were relegated again after two seasons in 1954, spending the next 20 years at the 3rd or 4th level of German football, before slipping down as far as the 7th division during the 1980s and 90s. The club finally returned to the Niedersachsenliga in 2000, now the 5th tier. Here the club usually finished in the upper half of the table, but narrowly missed the qualification for the new single-division Niedersachsenliga in 2010. After three seasons in the 6th tier Landesliga Braunschweig, the club returned to the Oberliga in 2013.

On 21 April 2014 the Turner reached the final of the Lower Saxony Cup, which also secured FT Braunschweig's qualification for the 2014–15 DFB-Pokal – the club's first ever participation in the main rounds of Germany's national cup competition. The semi-final, played in front of 6,350 spectators at Eintracht Braunschweig's Eintracht-Stadion, was won 1–0 against VfB Oldenburg. The final, which had no bearing on DFB-Pokal qualification, was lost 1–2 against BSV Schwarz-Weiß Rehden. In the first round of the 2014–15 DFB-Pokal, FT Braunschweig then lost 0–4 against Bundesliga side 1. FC Köln.

In the 2013–14 Oberliga season, the newly promoted side finished second, qualifying for the promotion play-offs into the Regionalliga Nord. In the play-off round, FT Braunschweig finished second behind VfB Lübeck, thus gaining their first promotion into the Regionalliga. It finished last in the league in 2014–15 and was relegated again.

== Honours ==
- Amateurliga Niedersachsen, Staffel 4 (III):
  - Champions (1): 1952
  - Runners-up (1): 1951
- Niedersachsenliga (V):
  - Runners-up (2): 2003 (East), 2014
- Landesliga Braunschweig (VI):
  - Champions (2): 2000, 2013
  - Runners-up (1): 2012
- Lower Saxony Cup:
  - Runners-up (1): 2014

== Notable former players ==
The list includes former players of FT Braunschweig who made appearances in professional football before or after playing for the club:

- Justin Eilers
- Marc Pfitzner
- Werner Thamm

== Other sports ==
As a multi sports club FT Braunschweig also has departments for badminton, basketball, gymnastics, Nordic walking, table tennis, and volleyball. In 1978 the club's basketball section entered into a cooperation with MTV Braunschweig to form SG Braunschweig, the predecessor of Basketball Bundesliga team Basketball Löwen Braunschweig.
