= BSV Schwarz-Weiß Rehden =

German sports club

- Full name: Ballsportverein „Schwarz-Weiß“ Rehden e.V.
- Founded: 1954
- Ground: Sportplatz Waldsportstätten
- Capacity: 4,350
- Chairman: Friedrich Schilling
- Manager: Predrag Uzelac
- League: Oberliga Niedersachsen (V)
- 2025–26: Oberliga Niedersachsen, 10th of 16
Home colours	Away colours	Third colours

BSV Schwarz-Weiß Rehden is a German sports club based in the municipality of Rehden, Lower Saxony. The club's football division currently plays in the fourth-tier Regionalliga Nord.

== History ==
The club was founded in 1954. After spending its early history in the local amateur leagues, the club was promoted to the fifth-tier Niedersachsenliga in 2001. Rehden then qualified for the 2003–04 DFB-Pokal, where they were eliminated by TSV 1860 München in the first round.

In 2011–12 Rehden won promotion to the Regionalliga Nord for the first time in their history, by finishing fourth in the Oberliga Niedersachsen. They played in the Regionalliga until the end of the 2022−23 season, when they were relegated back to the Oberliga.

In the 2013–14 DFB-Pokal, Rehden took on Bayern Munich in the first round. Rehden lost the match 5–0.

== Current squad ==
As of 22 January 2022

Note: Flags indicate national team as defined under FIFA eligibility rules; some limited exceptions apply. Players may hold more than one non-FIFA nationality.

No.	Pos.	Nation	Player
1	GK	POL	Maciej Czyżniewski
2	DF	SRB	Julijan Popović
3	DF	GER	Daniel Haritonov
4	DF	GER	Marco Kaffenberger
5	DF	GER	Serkan Temin
6	DF	GER	Jan Roschlaub
7	MF	GER	Niklas Kiene
8	FW	POR	Bocar Djumo
10	MF	KOS	Kamer Krasniqi
13	FW	CGO	Addy-Waku Menga
16	MF	GER	David Kinner

No.	Pos.	Nation	Player
19	MF	BIH	Josip Tomić
20	FW	USA	Kevin Coleman
21	GK	GER	Flemming Niemann
22	FW	COD	Emeraude Betani-Baku
23	DF	GRE	Angelos Argyris
26	DF	GER	Alexander Nandzik
27	FW	GER	Landry Imboula
30	FW	JAM	Michael Seaton
31	DF	GER	Pierre Becken
32	MF	GER	Marcel Schillmöller

== Stadium ==
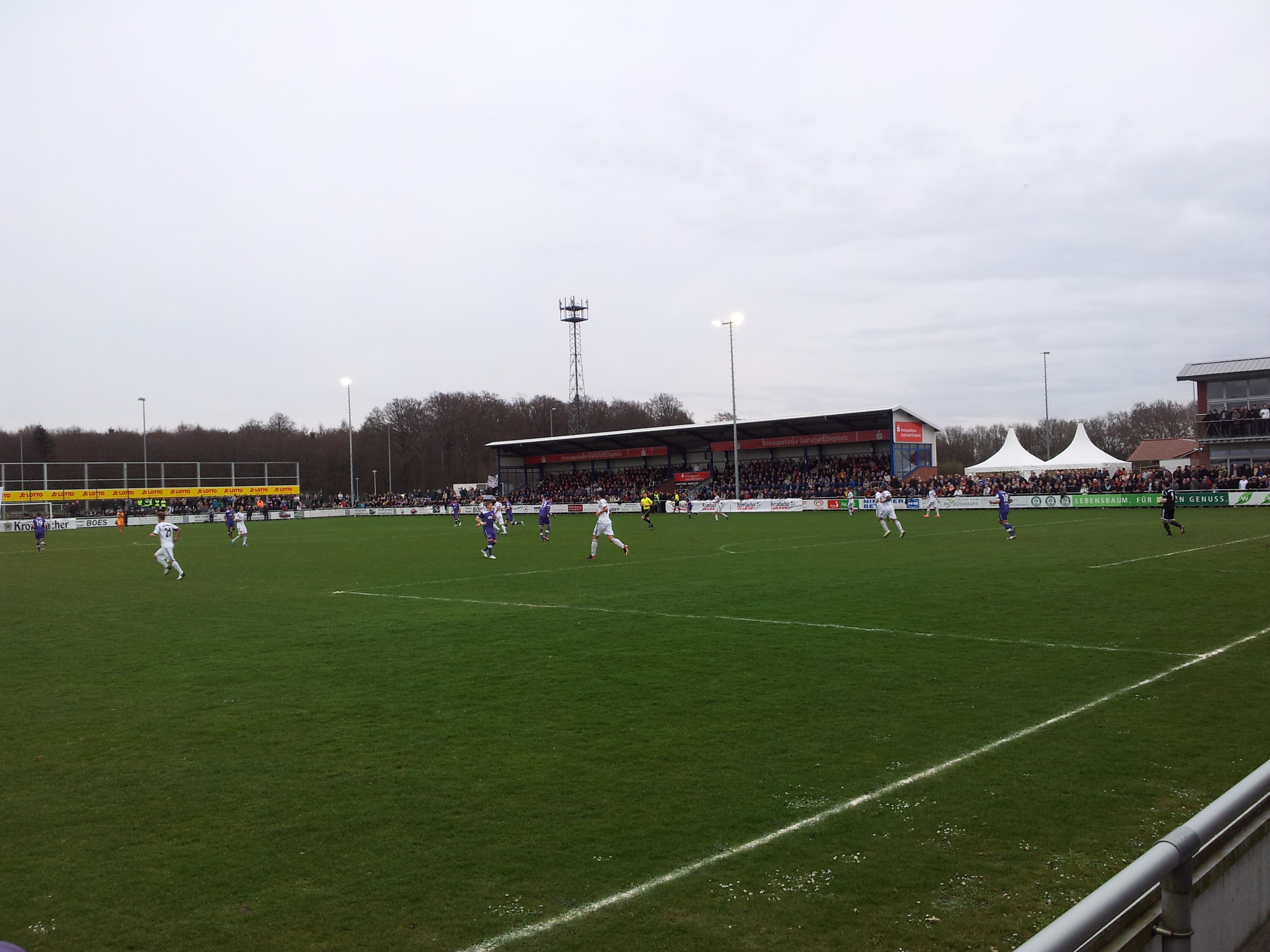
Sportplatz Waldsportstätten

The club's home ground, Sportplatz Waldsportstätten, holds 4,350 spectators, 350 of those seated.

== Honours ==
- Lower Saxony Cup
  - Winners: 2014, 2022

== Notable managers ==
- (Poland) Marek Leśniak
