= VfL Oldenburg =

German sports club

- Full name: Verein für Leibesübungen Oldenburg
- Founded: 1894
- Ground: Hans-Prull-Stadion
- Capacity: 4,000
- League: Landesliga Weser-Ems (VI)
- 2024–25: Oberliga Niedersachsen 18th of 18 (relegated)
- Website: www.vfl-oldenburg-fussball.de
Home colours	Away colours

VfL Oldenburg is a German sports club from the town of Oldenburg, Lower Saxony which is best known for its football team, which plays in the Landesliga Weser-Ems, the sixth level of the German football league system. The club has over 2,000 members in nine different sports departments including handball, American football, badminton, athletics, gymnastics and volleyball.

== History ==
VfL Oldenburg were relegated from the German fifth tier (Oberliga) in 2009–10. In 2013, they returned to the Oberliga Niedersachsen as Landesliga Weser-Ems champions. In 2018, the club achieved promotion to the Regionalliga Nord. It was relegated back to the Oberliga after the 2018–19 season.

In June 2021, it was announced that VfL Oldenburg had qualified for 2021–22 DFB-Pokal. The club was awarded the DFB-Pokal berth after a draw between the remaining participants of the Lower Saxony Cup, which had been abandoned amid the COVID-19 pandemic in Germany.

== Local derby rivalry ==
VfL Oldenburg has a local derby rivalry with VfB Oldenburg.

== Current squad ==
As of April 18, 2026

Note: Flags indicate national team as defined under FIFA eligibility rules; some limited exceptions apply. Players may hold more than one non-FIFA nationality.

No.	Pos.	Nation	Player
1	GK	GER	Thilo Pöpken
2	DF	GER	Tassilo Thiele
3	DF	GER	Niklas Onnen
5	MF	GER	Niklas Isserstedt
6	MF	GER	Louis Triphaus
7	FW	GER	Diego Frers
8	MF	GER	Lonis Hutson
9	FW	GER	Tade Niehues
11	MF	GER	Marcel Raßmann
12	GK	GER	Joshua Voigt
13	DF	GER	Maurice Scholz
14	MF	GER	Henri Hitrez
15	FW	IRQ	Ordi Kheder

No.	Pos.	Nation	Player
16	MF	GER	Christian Schneider
18	FW	GER	Pascal Richter
19	MF	GER	Mika Nienaber
20	MF	GER	Diego Raykov
21	DF	GER	Niklas Waskow
23	DF	GER	Phillip Onnen
24	MF	GER	Bent Janßen
25	MF	GER	Mathias Comes
26	DF	GER	Tobias Behnsen
27	MF	GER	Dennis Flechtner
—	DF	GER	Carsten Abbes
—	FW	GER	Johann Kühling

== Honours ==
- Verbandsliga Niedersachsen-West: 2008
- Landesliga Weser-Ems: 1984, 2004, 2013
