= Jan Zimmermann (footballer, born 1979) =

German footballer and manager

Personal information
- Date of birth: 5 October 1979 (age 47)
- Place of birth: Hanover, West Germany
- Height: 1.79 m (5 ft 10 in)
- Position: Forward

Team information
- Current team: RB Leipzig (assistant)

Youth career
- Bayer Leverkusen
- –1998: TSV Havelse

Senior career*
Years	Team	Apps	(Gls)
1998	Arminia Hannover		
1999–2001	TSV Havelse		
2001–2002	Borussia Mönchengladbach II		
2002–2003	Carl Zeiss Jena		
2003–2004	Eintracht Braunschweig	21	(0)
2004–2005	VfB Lübeck	17	(2)
2006	SC Verl		
2006–2007	1. FC Wunstorf		
2007–2011	TSV Havelse	31	(4)
2011–2014	Germania Egestorf/Langreder		

Managerial career
- 2011–2018: Germania Egestorf/Langreder
- 2018–2021: TSV Havelse
- 2021: Hannover 96
- 2023–2025: Borussia Dortmund II
- * Club domestic league appearances and goals

Jan Zimmermann (born 5 October 1979) is a German professional football manager and former player who is currently the assistant coach of Bundesliga club RB Leipzig.

== Playing career ==
Zimmermann was a youth product of Bayer Leverkusen. He spent his playing career at Arminia Hannover, TSV Havelse, Borussia Mönchengladbach II, Carl Zeiss Jena, Eintracht Braunschweig, VfB Lübeck, SC Verl, 1. FC Wunstorf and Germania Egestorf/Langreder.

== Managerial career ==
=== Germania Egestorf/Langreder ===
Zimmermann started his managerial career in 2011 at Germania Egestorf/Langreder as a player-manager. In his seven years as manager, he led the club from the sixth-tier Landesliga Hannover to the fourth-tier Regionalliga Nord. The club managed to qualify for the 2016–17 DFB-Pokal, losing 0–6 against 1899 Hoffenheim in the first round.

=== TSV Havelse ===
In 2018, Zimmermann was hired as the manager of TSV Havelse. During his tenure, Havelse won the 2019–20 Lower Saxony Cup, earning qualification to the 2020–21 DFB-Pokal, where Havelse lost 1–5 in the first round against Bundesliga club Mainz 05. In the abandoned 2020–21 Regionalliga Nord season, Havelse was ranked third and earned qualification to the promotion play-offs after Weiche Flensburg and Werder Bremen II did not apply for 3. Liga licenses.

=== Hannover 96 ===
On 10 May 2021, Zimmermann was announced as manager of Hannover 96 starting from the 2021–22 season. He was sacked on 29 November 2021.

=== Borussia Dortmund II ===
On 8 February 2023, Zimmerman was announced as manager of Borussia Dortmund II, signing a contract until June 2024; he replaced the sacked Christian Preußer. He was sacked on 5 May 2025 with Dortmund in the relegation zone in 3. Liga with two matches of the season remaining.

== Managerial statistics ==
As of match played 3 May 2025

Managerial record by team and tenure
Team	Nat	From	To	Record							
Team	Nat	From	To	G	W	D	L	GF	GA	GD	Win %
Germania Egestorf/Langreder	(Germany)	1 July 2011	23 October 2018	253	126	47	80	481	370	+111	49.80
TSV Havelse	(Germany)	10 December 2018	30 June 2021	52	27	10	15	94	69	+25	51.92
Hannover 96	(Germany)	1 July 2021	29 November 2021	17	5	5	7	17	22	−5	29.41
Borussia Dortmund II	(Germany)	8 February 2023	5 May 2025	91	32	25	34	140	129	+11	35.16
Total				413	190	87	136	732	590	+142	46.00

== Honours ==
=== Player ===
Germania Egestorf/Langreder

- Landesliga Hannover: 2011–12

=== Managerial ===
Germania Egestorf/Langreder

- Landesliga Hannover: 2011–12
- Lower Saxony Cup runner-up: 2015–16

TSV Havelse

- Lower Saxony Cup: 2019–20
