= 2016–17 Verbandspokal =

Tournament details
- Country: Germany
- Teams: 42

The 2016–17 Verbandspokal, (English: 2016–17 Association Cup) consisted of 21 men's German association football regional cup competitions, the Verbandspokale, which serve as qualifying competition for the 2017–18 DFB-Pokal (German Cup).

All clubs from the 3. Liga and below could enter the regional Verbandspokale, subject to the rules and regulations of each region. Clubs from the Bundesliga and 2. Bundesliga could not enter but were instead directly qualified for the first round of the DFB-Pokal. Reserve teams were not permitted to take part in the DFB-Pokal or the Verbandspokale. The precise rules of each regional Verbandspokal are laid down by the regional football association organising it.

All twenty one winners qualified for the first round of the German Cup in the following season. Three additional clubs are also qualified for the first round of the German Cup, these being from the three largest state associations, Bavaria, Westphalia and Lower Saxony. The qualified teams are the runners-up of the Lower Saxony Cup. In Bavaria the best-placed Regionalliga Bayern non-reserve team was qualified for the DFB-Pokal while in Westphalia a play-off is conducted to determine this club.

On 2 November 2016, it was announced that German broadcaster ARD would show all 21 Verbandspokal finals live in a conference as well as live stream them and that all finals would be played on the same date, 25 May 2017.

== Competitions ==
The finals of the 2016–17 Verbandspokal competitions:

| Cup | Date | Location | Team 1 | Result | Team 2 | Attendance | Report |
|---|---|---|---|---|---|---|---|
| Baden Cup (2016–17 season) | 25 May 2017 | Sinsheim | SG HD-Kirchheim | 0–5 | **FC Nöttingen** | | Report |
| Bavarian Cup (Note: As one of the three largest regional associations, Bavaria gets an additional DFB-Pokal berth, which goes to the best non-reserve team of the Regionalliga Bayern.) (2016–17 season) | 25 May 2017 | Burghausen | SV Wacker Burghausen | 0–1 | **1. FC Schweinfurt 05** | 2,485 | Report |
| Berlin Cup (2016–17 season) | 25 May 2017 | Berlin | FC Viktoria 1889 Berlin | 1–3 | **Berliner FC Dynamo** | | Report |
| Brandenburg Cup (2016–17 season) | 25 May 2017 | Cottbus | **FC Energie Cottbus** | 2–0 | FSV 63 Luckenwalde | 7,667 | Report |
| Bremen Cup (2016–17 season) | 25 May 2017 | Bremen | **Leher TS** | 0–0 (9–8 pen.) | Bremer SV | | Report |
| Hamburg Cup (2016–17 season) | 25 May 2017 | Hamburg | **Eintracht Norderstedt** | 2–1 (a.e.t.) | SV Halstenbek-Rellingen | | Report |
| Hessian Cup (2016–17 season) | 25 May 2017 | Wiesbaden | SV Rot-Weiß Hadamar | 1–1 (a.e.t.) (3–4 pen.) | **SV Wehen Wiesbaden** | | Report |
| Lower Rhine Cup (2016–17 season) | 25 May 2017 | Essen | Rot-Weiss Essen | 0–2 | **MSV Duisburg** | 17,000 | Report |
| Lower Saxony Cup (Note: As one of the three largest regional associations, Lower Saxony gets an additional DFB-Pokal berth, which goes to the losing cup finalist.) (2016–17 season) | 25 May 2017 | Osnabrück | **VfL Osnabrück** | 1–0 | Lüneburger SK Hansa | | Report |
| Mecklenburg-Vorpommern Cup (2016–17 season) | 25 May 2017 | Neustrelitz | **F.C. Hansa Rostock** | 3–1 | MSV Pampow | 2,708 | Report |
| Middle Rhine Cup (2016–17 season) | 25 May 2017 | Bonn | SC Fortuna Köln | 0–1 | **Bonner SC** | 6,643 | Report |
| Rhineland Cup (2016–17 season) | 25 May 2017 | Salmtal | Eintracht Trier | 1–2 | **TuS Koblenz** | 4,112 | Report |
| Saarland Cup (2016–17 season) | 25 May 2017 | Homburg | SV Elversberg | 2–3 | **1. FC Saarbrücken** | | Report |
| Saxony Cup (2016–17 season) | 24 May 2017 | Leipzig | 1. FC Lokomotive Leipzig | 1–2 | **Chemnitzer FC** | 6,800 | Report |
| Saxony-Anhalt Cup (2016–17 season) | 25 May 2017 | Magdeburg | **1. FC Magdeburg** | 1–0 | VfB Germania Halberstadt | 7,134 | Report |
| Schleswig-Holstein Cup (2016–17 season) | 25 May 2017 | Kiel | SV Eichede | 2–4 | **Holstein Kiel** | 2,808 | Report |
| South Baden Cup (2016–17 season) | 25 May 2017 | Villingen | VfR Hausen | 1–6 | **1. FC Rielasingen-Arlen** | | Report |
| Southwestern Cup (2016–17 season) | 25 May 2017 | Pirmasens | Wormatia Worms | 1–2 | **SV Morlautern** | 2,410 | Report |
| Thuringian Cup (2016–17 season) | 25 May 2017 | Erfurt | FSV Wacker 90 Nordhausen | 0–1 | **FC Rot-Weiß Erfurt** | 8,807 | Report |
| Westphalian Cup (Note: As one of the three largest regional associations, Westphalia gets an additional DFB-Pokal berth, which goes to the winner of a play-off between the best-placed team in the Regionalliga West and the winner of the Oberliga Westfalen.) (2016–17 season) | 25 May 2017 | Paderborn | **SC Paderborn 07** | 3–1 | Sportfreunde Lotte | 4,142 | Report |
| Württemberg Cup (2016–17 season) | 25 May 2017 | Stuttgart | **Sportfreunde Dorfmerkingen** | 3–1 | Stuttgarter Kickers | 5,150 | Report |

Notes
Winners in bold
