= Merchas Doski =

Footballer (born 1999)

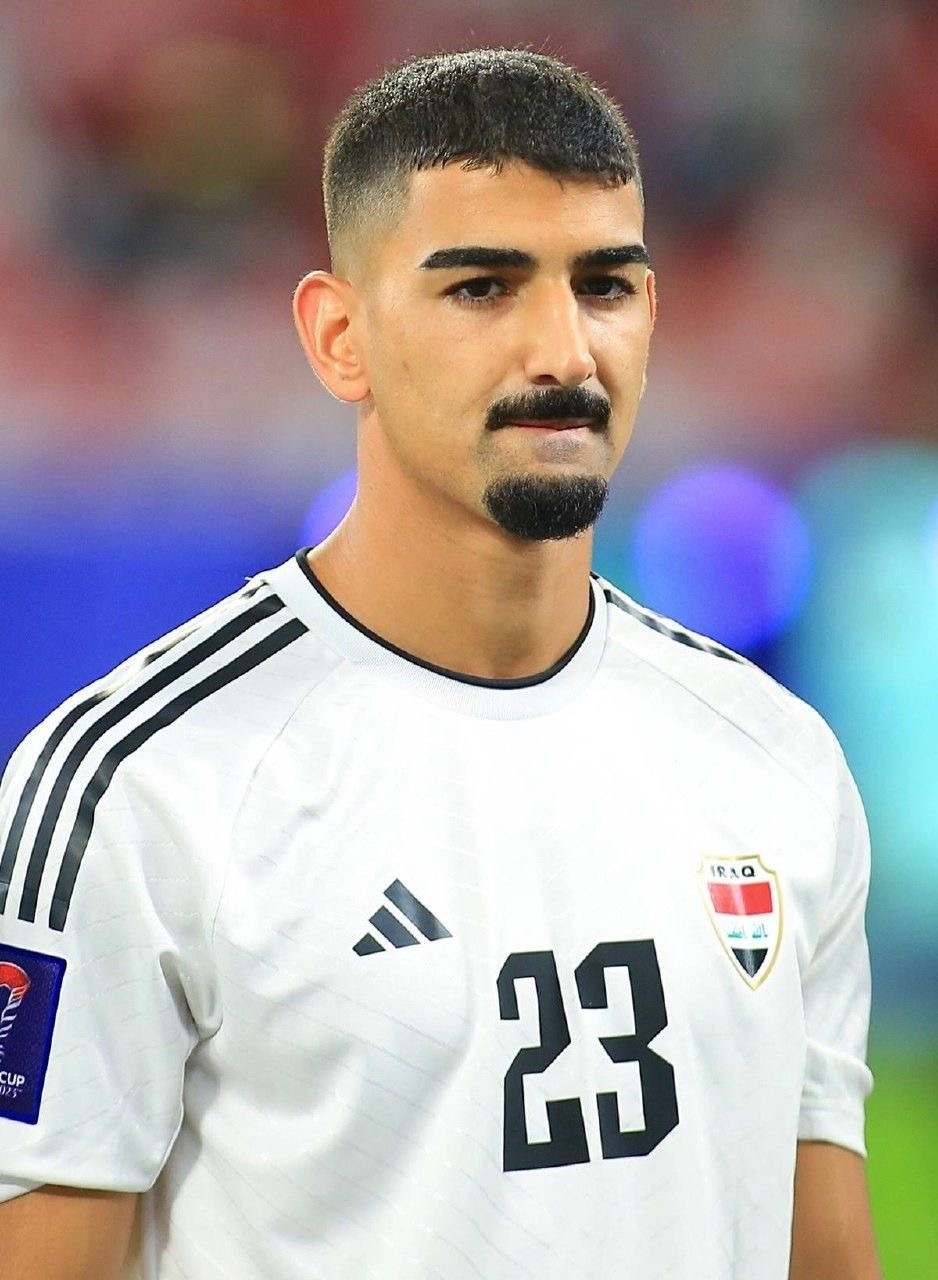
- Doski with Iraq in 2024

Personal information
- Full name: Merchas Ghazi Salih Doski
- Date of birth: 7 December 1999 (age 26)
- Place of birth: Hanover, Germany
- Height: 1.73 m (5 ft 8 in)
- Position: Left-back

Team information
- Current team: Viktoria Plzeň
- Number: 14

Youth career
- Arminia Hannover
- Germania Egestorf/Langreder

Senior career*
Years	Team	Apps	(Gls)
2017–2018	Germania Egestorf/Langreder II		
2018–2019	Heesseler SV		
2019–2020	MTV Eintracht Celle	19	(0)
2020–2022	FC Wacker Innsbruck	10	(1)
2020–2022	FC Wacker Innsbruck II	18	(0)
2022–2024	Slovácko	63	(4)
2025–	Viktoria Plzeň	47	(1)

International career^{‡}
2022	Iraq U23	4	(0)
2022–	Iraq	34	(1)
- * Club domestic league appearances and goals as of 16 September 2026 ‡ National team caps and goals as of 27 July 2026

Merchas Ghazi Salih Doski (Kurdish: مێرخاس غازی ساڵح دۆسکی, romanized: Mêrxas Xazî Sałiĥ Doskî, Arabic: ميرخاس غازي صالح دوسكي) is a professional footballer who plays as a left-back for Viktoria Plzeň. Born in Germany, he plays for the Iraq national team.

== Club career ==
Born in Hanover to Iraqi Kurdish parents from Zakho, Doski grew up in the district of Vahrenheide. He played youth football with Arminia Hannover and Germania Egestorf/Langreder. Having established himself at Landesliga club Heesseler SV he earned a move to MTV Eintracht Celle of the fifth-tier Oberliga.

In July 2020, after trialling at the club, Doski signed with Austrian side Wacker Innsbruck. He scored his first goal for the club's first team in November, in a 3–2 win against SV Horn in the Austrian 2. Liga. He agreed a new contract until 2023 with Wacker Innsbruck in December. His first-team game time was limited but he played in a friendly against Liverpool in the summer of 2021. In May 2022 he terminated his contract at Wacker Innsbruck after the club had failed to pay the salaries of players.

After starring in the 2022 AFC U-23 Asian Cup in Uzbekistan, he went on trial at Slovácko and later earned the move to the Czech Cup winners, where he established himself as a first team regular. He played with them in the 2022–23 UEFA Conference League.

On 19 December 2024, Doski signed for Viktoria Plzeň. He played with them in the 2025–26 UEFA Europa League, reaching the knockout phase play-offs.

== International career ==
Also eligible to represent Germany, Doski was invited to the Iraqi Olympic team camp in January 2022, and was one of five Iraqi players based abroad that were later selected for the 2022 Dubai Cup in March. He made his debut against Vietnam and went on to play against Saudi Arabia and Thailand too.

He played in both warm-up matches against Iran before being selected for the 2022 AFC U-23 Asian Cup in Uzbekistan. He was one of the stand out players of Iraq during the tournament, scoring in the penalty shoot-out against Uzbekistan.

On 25 August 2022, Doski was called up for the first time to the first team to play in the 2022 Jordan International Tournament.

In December 2023, Doski was named in the Iraqi squad for the 2023 AFC Asian Cup held in Qatar.

In the Intercontinental Playoff Final in March 2026, Doski's Iraq faced Bolivia and secured a 2–1 victory, qualifying the country for the 2026 FIFA World Cup for the first time since 1986.

On 1 June 2026, Doski was named in the Iraqi squad for the 2026 FIFA World Cup held in the United States, Canada and Mexico. Three days later, he scored his first goal for Iraq in a friendly match against Spain in preparation for the World Cup. During the World Cup, he had the highest average number of successful tackles, while Iraq did not advance from the group stage.

In September 2026, Doski was named in the Iraqi squad for the 27th Arabian Gulf Cup held in Saudi Arabia.

== Career statistics ==
=== Club ===
As of match played 16 March 2024

Appearances and goals by club, season and competition
Club	Season	League			National cup		Europe		Other		Total	
Club	Season	Division	Apps	Goals	Apps	Goals	Apps	Goals	Apps	Goals	Apps	Goals
Germania Egestorf/Langreder II	2017–18	LL Hannover			—		—		—			
Heesseler SV	2018–19	LL Hannover			—		—		—			
MTV Eintracht Celle	2019–20	Oberliga Niedersachsen	19	0			—		—		19	0
Wacker Innsbruck	2020–21	2. Liga	4	1	0	0	—		—		4	1
Wacker Innsbruck	2021–22	2. Liga	6	0	1	0	—		—		7	0
Wacker Innsbruck	Total		10	1	1	0	—		—		11	1
Wacker Innsbruck II	2020–21	Regionalliga Tirol	11	0	—		—		—		11	0
Wacker Innsbruck II	2021–22	Regionalliga Tirol	7	0	—		—		—		7	0
Wacker Innsbruck II	Total		18	0	—		—		—		18	0
Slovácko	2022–23	Czech First League	26	3	3	0	10 (Note: Eight appearances in UEFA Europa Conference League, two appearances in UEFA Europa League)	0	—		39	3
Slovácko	2023–24	Czech First League	21	1	1	0	0	0	—		22	1
Slovácko	Total		47	4	4	0	10	0	—		61	4
Career total			94	5	5	0	10	0	0	0	109	5

=== International ===
As of match played 4 June 2026

Appearances and goals by national team and year
National team	Year	Apps	Goals
Iraq	2022	2	0
Iraq	2023	7	0
Iraq	2024	11	0
Iraq	2025	9	0
Iraq	2026	2	1
Total		31	1

Scores and results list Iraq goal tally first, score column indicates score after each Doski goal

List of international goals scored by Merchas Doski
No.	Date	Venue	Opponent	Score	Result	Competition
1	4 June 2026	Estadio Riazor, A Coruña, Spain	Spain	1–1	1–1	Friendly

== Honours ==
Iraq

- King's Cup: 2023, 2025
