= Kevin Schumacher =

German footballer

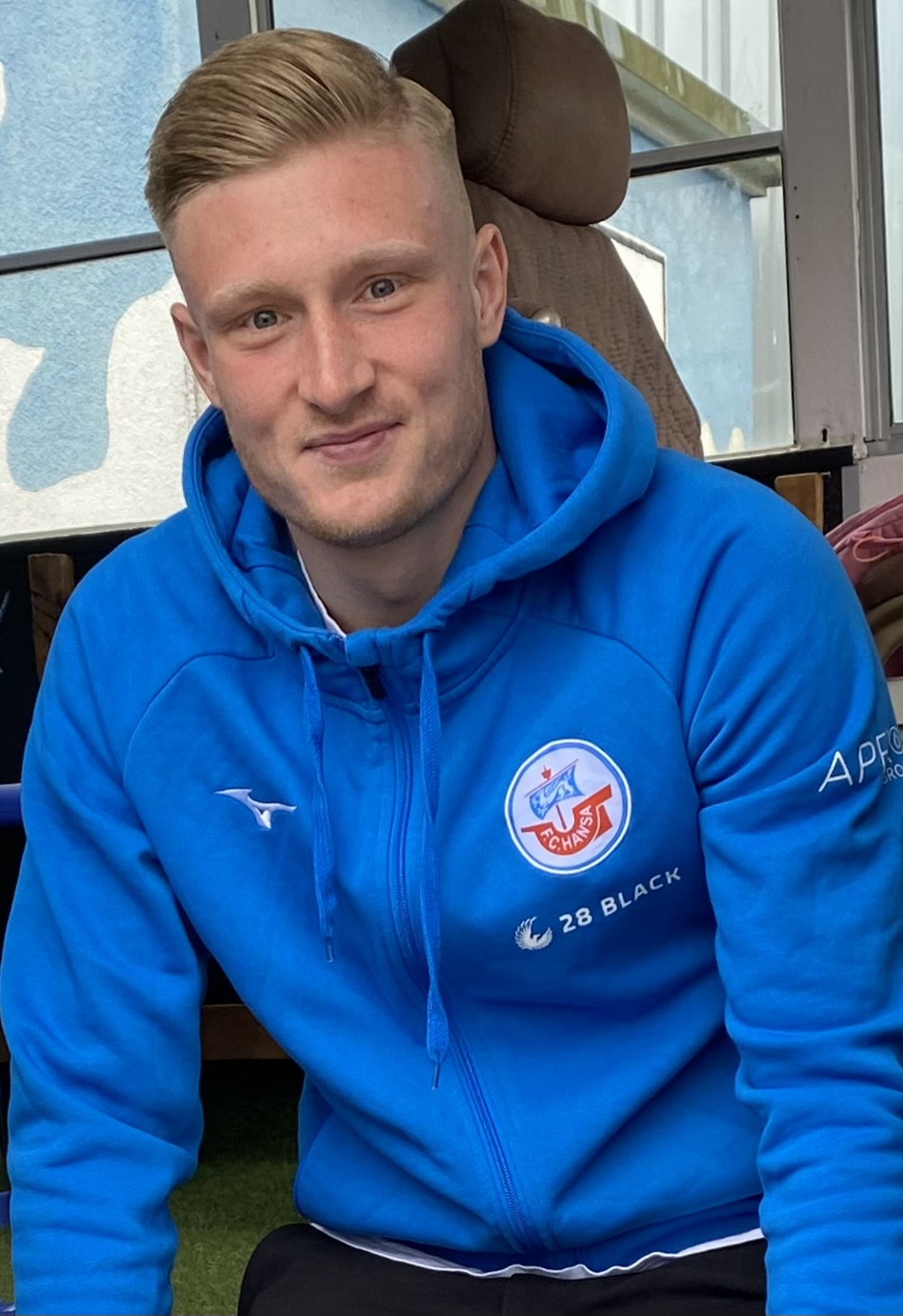
- Schumacher in 2024

Personal information
- Date of birth: 24 December 1997 (age 28)
- Place of birth: Salzhemmendorf, Germany
- Height: 1.82 m (6 ft 0 in)
- Position: Left winger

Team information
- Current team: TSV Havelse
- Number: 10

Youth career
- –2015: BW Salzhemmendorf

Senior career*
Years	Team	Apps	(Gls)
2015–2016	SpVgg Bad Pyrmont	30	(26)
2016–2018	1. FC Germania Egestorf/Langreder	65	(11)
2018–2020	Werder Bremen II	44	(5)
2020–2021	TSV Havelse	9	(1)
2021–2025	Hansa Rostock	105	(4)
2025–2026	VfL Osnabrück	17	(0)
2026–	TSV Havelse	0	(0)
- * Club domestic league appearances and goals as of 3 July 2026

Kevin Schumacher (born 24 December 1997) is a German professional footballer who plays as a left winger for 3. Liga club TSV Havelse.

After starting his career at SpVgg Bad Pyrmont in 2015, Schumacher joined Regionalliga Nord side 1. FC Germania Egestorf/Langreder in 2016 after 26 goals in 30 games for Bad Pyrmont. In summer 2018, he signed for Werder Bremen II, also in the Regionalliga Nord. After two seasons with Werder Bremen II, he joined TSV Havelse before signing for 2. Bundesliga club Hansa Rostock in summer 2021.

== Career ==
=== Youth and amateur ===
Schumacher began his youth career at BW Salzhemmendorf at the age of 5. He progressed through all the youth teams at the club up to A-Youth level. In summer 2015, Schumacher transferred to SpVgg Bad Pyrmont in the Bezirksliga Hannover Staffel 4. Schumacher was part of the Bad Pyrmont side promoted to the Fußball-Landesliga Niedersachsen in 2016 as champions of the Bezirksliga Hannover Staffel 4. He was also their top scorer with 26 goals in 30 matches and attracted the interest of other clubs. Despite initial disagreement between the two clubs over the transfer fee due, he signed for Regionalliga Nord side 1. FC Germania Egestorf/Langreder in July 2016.

Under coach Jan Zimmermann, Schumacher debuted on 3 August 2016 in a 3–0 defeat to VfV 06 Hildesheim in the Lower Saxony Cup quarter-final, with Schumacher making his Regionalliga debut three days later, coming on as a 70th-minute substitute for Christoph Beismann in a 4–0 defeat to VfB Lübeck. He scored his first goal of the season on matchday 10 with the third goal of a 4–0 victory over SV Eichede. Over the course of the season, Schumacher scored 4 goals in 32 league matches as Germania achieved a 10th-placed league finish. He scored 7 in 33 league games the following season, missing just one game through suspension as the club finished 5th in the league table.

In summer 2018, Schumacher signed for fellow Regionalliga Nord side Werder Bremen II. He made his debut for the club in the opening game of the season, starting in a 0–0 draw with VfL Wolfsburg II. He scored his first goal for the club in a 4–0 win over Hamburger SV II during the third matchday. Schumacher made 26 appearances and scored 4 goals as Werder Bremen II finished 3rd in the Regionalliga Nord. He scored once in 18 games across the 2019–20 season, which was cut short due to the COVID-19 pandemic. He left Werder Bremen reserves at the end of the season.

In June 2020, Schumacher signed a one-year contract TSV Havelse, reuniting him with former Egestorf/Langreder coach Jan Zimmermann. Schumacher made his debut for Havelse on 23 August 2020 against BSV Rehden in the Lower Saxony Cup final, which was originally due to be played in May 2020; Havelse won 4–1. Schumacher scored once in 9 league matches prior to the suspension of the season in November 2020. The league season was cancelled in April 2021 with Havelse qualifying for the promotion play-offs after the top teams in both groups of the Regionalliga Nord did not apply for a 3. Liga license. Schumacher played in both legs of the play-off against 1. FC Schweinfurt 05 with Havelse promoted to the 3. Liga after both legs were won 1–0 with Schumacher having scored Havelse's second leg goal.

=== Hansa Rostock ===
On 2 July 2021, Schumacher joined Hansa Rostock on a two-year contract. Under Hansa coach Jens Härtel, he made his professional debut on 24 July 2021 in a 3–1 home defeat to Karlsruher SC. He made 22 2. Bundesliga appearances across the 2021–22 season.

=== VfL Osnabrück ===
On 28 May 2025, Schumacher moved to VfL Osnabrück in 3. Liga.

=== Return to Havelse ===
Schumacher returned to TSV Havelse ahead of the 2026–27 season.

== Honours ==
SpVgg Bad Pyrmont

- Bezirksliga Hannover Staffel 4: 2016

TSV Havelse

- Lower Saxony Cup: 2020

VfL Osnabrück

- 3. Liga: 2025–26
