= Dieter Schatzschneider =

German footballer and manager

Personal information
- Date of birth: 26 April 1958 (age 68)
- Place of birth: Hannover, West Germany
- Height: 1.87 m (6 ft 2 in)
- Position: Striker

Youth career
- 1970–1971: Sachsenross Hannover
- 1971–1974: Hannoverscher SC
- 1974–1975: OSV Hannover

Senior career*
Years	Team	Apps	(Gls)
1975–1978	OSV Hannover	67	(40)
1978–1982	Hannover 96	160	(131)
1982–1983	Fortuna Köln	19	(17)
1983–1984	Hamburger SV	31	(15)
1984–1986	Schalke 04	47	(10)
1986–1987	Fortuna Köln	22	(5)
1987–1988	Grazer AK	27	(4)
1988–1989	Hannover 96	18	(3)
1989–1990	FC Augsburg	8	(1)
Total		399	(226)

International career
1980–1981	West Germany U-21	7	(2)
1982–1984	West Germany Olympic	11	(8)

Managerial career
- 1994–1996: Altona 93
- 1996–1998: Sportfreunde Ricklingen
- 1998–2000: FC Augsburg
Medal record
Fortuna Köln
Runner-up	DFB-Pokal	1983
Hamburger SV
Runner-up	European Super Cup	1983
Runner-up	Intercontinental Cup	1983
- * Club domestic league appearances and goals

Dieter Schatzschneider (Note: The "tzsch" part of his name is not a pentagraph, as if to pronounce a /tʃ/, but is phonetically separated to be pronounced like "Schatz-schneider".) (born 26 April 1958) is a German former footballer who formerly held the record for the highest number of 2. Bundesliga goals (154). He is well-known mostly for being associated with Hannover 96, for whom he is also their record goalscorer.

He played in the 1984 Olympics for the West Germany football team.

After retiring from playing, he coached as various clubs including Emden, Sportfreunde Ricklingen, Arminia Hannover and SVG Göttingen 07.
