= 2026–27 Verbandspokal =

Tournament details
- Country: Germany
- Teams: 44

The 2026–27 Verbandspokal (English: 2026–27 Association Cup) consists of twenty-one regional cup competitions, the Verbandspokale, the qualifying competition for the 2027–28 DFB-Pokal, the German Cup.

All clubs from the 3. Liga and below could enter the regional Verbandspokale, subject to the rules and regulations of each region. Clubs from the Bundesliga and 2. Bundesliga do not enter but were instead directly qualified for the first round of the DFB-Pokal. Reserve teams are not permitted to take part in the DFB-Pokal or the Verbandspokale. The precise rules of each regional Verbandspokal were laid down by the regional football association organising it.

All twenty-one winners qualify for the first round of the German Cup in the following season. Three additional clubs also qualify for the first round of the German Cup, these being from the three largest state associations, Bavaria, Westphalia and Lower Saxony. The Lower Saxony Cup is split into two paths, one for teams from the 3. Liga and the Regionalliga Nord and one for the teams from lower leagues. The winners of both paths qualify for the DFB-Pokal. In Bavaria the best-placed non-reserve Regionalliga Bayern team qualifies for the DFB-Pokal while in Westphalia the spot alternated between the Oberliga Westfalen champion and best-placed Westphalian team from the Regionalliga West. This year, the best-placed Westphalian team from the Regionalliga qualifies.

The finals of the Verbandspokal competitions will be played on the Amateurs' Final Day (German: Finaltag der Amateure), on 29 May 2027.

== Competitions ==
The finals of the 2026–27 Verbandspokal competitions (winners listed in bold):

Cup	Date	Location	Team 1	Result	Team 2	Report
Baden Cup (2026–27 season)	29 May 2027					
Bavarian Cup (Note: As one of the three largest regional associations, Bavaria gets an additional DFB-Pokal berth, which goes to the best non-reserve team of the Regionalliga Bayern.) (2026–27 season)	29 May 2027					
Berlin Cup (2026–27 season)	29 May 2027					
Brandenburg Cup (2026–27 season)	29 May 2027					
Bremen Cup (2026–27 season)	29 May 2027					
Hamburg Cup (2026–27 season)	29 May 2027					
Hessian Cup (2026–27 season)	29 May 2027					
Lower Rhine Cup (2026–27 season)	29 May 2027					
Lower Saxony Cup (Note: As one of the three largest regional associations, Lower Saxony gets an additional DFB-Pokal berth, which goes to the winner of the second cup path.) (2026–27 season (3. Liga / Regionalliga)) (2026–27 season (amateurs))	29 May 2027					
Lower Saxony Cup (2026–27 season (3. Liga / Regionalliga)) (2026–27 season (amateurs))	20 May 2027					
Mecklenburg-Vorpommern Cup (2026–27 season)	29 May 2027					
Middle Rhine Cup (2026–27 season)	29 May 2027					
Rhineland Cup (2026–27 season)	29 May 2027					
Saarland Cup	29 May 2027					
Saxony Cup (2026–27 season)	29 May 2027					
Saxony-Anhalt Cup (2026–27 season)	29 May 2027					
Schleswig-Holstein Cup (2026–27 season)	29 May 2027					
South Baden Cup (2026–27 season)	29 May 2027					
Southwestern Cup (2026–27 season)	29 May 2027					
Thuringian Cup (2026–27 season)	29 May 2027					
Westphalian Cup (Note: As one of the three largest regional associations, Westphalia gets an additional DFB-Pokal berth, which will alternate between the Oberliga Westfalen champion and best-placed Westphalian team from the Regionalliga West. This year, the Oberliga Westfalen champion qualifies.) (2026–27 season)	29 May 2027					
Württemberg Cup (2026–27 season)	29 May 2027					
