= Amardo Oakley =

American soccer player

Personal information
- Full name: Amardo Akeem Oakley
- Date of birth: 23 May 1994 (age 32)
- Place of birth: Portmore, Saint Catherine, Jamaica
- Position: Defender

Youth career
- 2012–2014: Louisburg Hurricanes

Senior career*
Years	Team	Apps	(Gls)
2014	Myrtle Beach Mutiny		
2015	Burlington SC		
2015	Burlington SC II		
2017	Burlington SC		
2017–2018	TSV Krähenwinkel	7	(1)
2019–2020	Lusitano		
2021–2023	Guelph United FC	51	(2)
2024	Athlone Town	31	(1)
2025–	Guelph United FC	20	(0)
- * Club domestic league appearances and goals as of 4 September 2025

Amardo Oakley (born May 23, 1994) is a Jamaican footballer who plays as a defender for Guelph United FC in League1 Ontario.

== Club career ==
=== Youth career ===
Oakley played soccer at the high school level in the United States with Mt. Saint Vernon. In the 2012 season, he served as the team captain and helped the team win the National District title and was named to the second team all-region. The following season, he made the transition to the college level by enrolling in the Louisburg College soccer program. During his two-year tenure with the Hurricanes, he assisted the team in securing the Region X tournament.

=== Early career ===
After the conclusion of his college stint, he played in the National Premier Soccer League with Myrtle Beach Mutiny. In 2015, he went abroad to play in the Southern Ontario-based Canadian Soccer League with Burlington SC. He primarily played in the league's second division with the reserve squad where he finished as the club's top goal scorer with 12 goals. Oakley would also feature with the senior team where he recorded a hattrick against Scarborough SC. His hat-trick would help the club secure a playoff berth by finishing sixth in the first division. Burlington would be eliminated from the playoffs in the first round by the York Region Shooters. The reserve team was also defeated in the first round by Brantford Galaxy's reserve squad.

In the summer of 2017, he returned to his former club Burlington where he once again finished as the club's top goal scorer with 7 goals. He would help the club clinch a postseason in the second division. Burlington ultimately reached the championship final against FC Ukraine United where he contributed a goal but lost the match.

=== Europe ===
After his stint in Canada, he played in Germany's Landesliga Hannover with TSV Krähenwinkel. In 2019, he played in Portugal's Campeonato de Portugal with Lusitano F.C.

=== Canada ===
He returned to Canada to sign with expansion side Guelph United in the summer of 2021. In his debut season, he helped the club win the league championship and was named the league's defender of the year. In the 2022 season, he re-signed with the club and participated in the 2022 Canadian Championship where he played in the preliminary round against HFX Wanderers FC. For the second consecutive season, he was named the league's top defender. Oakley returned for his third term for the club in 2023.

=== Ireland ===
In the early winter of 2024, he went abroad to sign with Athlone Town in the Irish second division. He made his league debut on February 16, 2024, and recorded a goal against Wexford. Oakley helped Athlone clinch a promotion playoff berth and were eliminated in the second round by Bray Wanderers.
