= 2023–24 Verbandspokal =

Tournament details
- Country: Germany
- Teams: 44

The 2023–24 Verbandspokal (English: 2023–24 Association Cup) consisted of twenty-one regional cup competitions, the Verbandspokale, the qualifying competition for the 2024–25 DFB-Pokal, the German Cup.

All clubs from the 3. Liga and below could enter the regional Verbandspokale, subject to the rules and regulations of each region. Clubs from the Bundesliga and 2. Bundesliga did not enter but were instead directly qualified for the first round of the DFB-Pokal. Reserve teams were not permitted to take part in the DFB-Pokal or the Verbandspokale. The precise rules of each regional Verbandspokal were laid down by the regional football association organising it.

All twenty-one winners qualified for the first round of the German Cup in the following season. Three additional clubs also qualify for the first round of the German Cup, these being from the three largest state associations, Bavaria, Westphalia and Lower Saxony. The Lower Saxony Cup was split into two paths, one for teams from the 3. Liga and the Regionalliga Nord and one for the teams from lower leagues. The winners of both paths qualified for the DFB-Pokal. In Bavaria the best-placed non-reserve Regionalliga Bayern team qualified for the DFB-Pokal while in Westphalia the spot alternated between the Oberliga Westfalen champion and best-placed Westphalian team from the Regionalliga West. This year, the Oberliga Westfalen champion qualified.

The finals of the Verbandspokal competitions was played on the Amateurs' Final Day (German: Finaltag der Amateure), on 25 May 2024.

== Competitions ==
The finals of the 2023–24 Verbandspokal competitions (winners listed in bold):

Cup	Date	Location	Team 1	Result	Team 2	Report
Baden Cup (2023–24 season)	25 May 2024	Walldorf	1. FC Mühlhausen	0–8	**SV Sandhausen**	Report
Bavarian Cup (Note: As one of the three largest regional associations, Bavaria gets an additional DFB-Pokal berth, which goes to the best non-reserve team of the Regionalliga Bayern.) (2023–24 season)	25 May 2024	Würzburg	Würzburger Kickers	1–2	**FC Ingolstadt**	Report
Berlin Cup (2023–24 season)	25 May 2024	Berlin	**Viktoria Berlin**	3–0	Makkabi Berlin	Report
Brandenburg Cup (2023–24 season)	25 May 2024	Cottbus	**Energie Cottbus**	3–1	SV Babelsberg	Report
Bremen Cup (2023–24 season)	25 May 2024	Bremen	SV Hemelingen	0–3	**Bremer SV**	Report
Hamburg Cup (2023–24 season)	25 May 2024	Hamburg	USC Paloma	0–4	**Teutonia Ottensen**	Report
Hessian Cup (2023–24 season)	25 May 2024	Frankfurt	Türk Gücü Friedberg	2–3	**Kickers Offenbach**	Report
Lower Rhine Cup (2023–24 season)	25 May 2024	Essen	Rot-Weiß Oberhausen	0–3	**Rot-Weiss Essen**	Report
Lower Saxony Cup (Note: As one of the three largest regional associations, Lower Saxony gets an additional DFB-Pokal berth, which goes to the winner of the second cup path.) (2023–24 season (3. Liga / Regionalliga)) (2023–24 season (amateurs))	28 March 2024	Meppen	**SV Meppen**	2–0	Blau-Weiß Lohne	Report
Lower Saxony Cup (2023–24 season (3. Liga / Regionalliga)) (2023–24 season (amateurs))	25 May 2024	Hildesheim	**VfV Hildesheim**	2–0	Atlas Delmenhorst	Report
Mecklenburg-Vorpommern Cup (2023–24 season)	25 May 2024	Greifswald	**Greifswalder FC**	5–0	TSG Neustrelitz	Report
Middle Rhine Cup (2023–24 season)	25 May 2024	Cologne	**Alemannia Aachen**	4–2	Bonner SC	Report
Rhineland Cup (2023–24 season)	25 May 2024	Koblenz	**TuS Koblenz**	2–0	SG Schneifel	Report
Saarland Cup (2023–24 season)	25 May 2024	Saarbrücken	**1. FC Saarbrücken**	2–1	FC 08 Homburg	Report
Saxony Cup (2023–24 season)	25 May 2024	Dresden	**Dynamo Dresden**	2–0 (a.e.t.)	Erzgebirge Aue	Report
Saxony-Anhalt Cup (2023–24 season)	25 May 2024	Halle	Germania Halberstadt	2–4 (a.e.t.)	**Hallescher FC**	Report
Schleswig-Holstein Cup (2023–24 season)	25 May 2024	Todesfelde	SV Todesfelde	1–3	**Phönix Lübeck**	Report
South Baden Cup (2023–24 season)	25 May 2024	Freiburg	**FC 08 Villingen**	1–0	SC Lahr	Report
Southwestern Cup (2023–24 season)	25 May 2024	Ingelheim	**Schott Mainz**	4–1	SV Gonsenheim	Report
Thuringian Cup (2023–24 season)	25 May 2024	Meuselwitz	ZFC Meuselwitz	0–4	**Carl Zeiss Jena**	Report
Westphalian Cup (Note: As one of the three largest regional associations, Westphalia gets an additional DFB-Pokal berth, which will alternate between the Oberliga Westfalen champion and best-placed Westphalian team from the Regionalliga West. This year, the Oberliga Westfalen champion qualifies.) (2023–24 season)	25 May 2024	Bielefeld	**Arminia Bielefeld**	3–1	SC Verl	Report
Württemberg Cup (2023–24 season)	25 May 2024	Aspach	Sonnenhof Großaspach	1–4	**VfR Aalen**	Report
