= Ibrahim Al-Dawoud =

Palestinian footballer (born 2000)

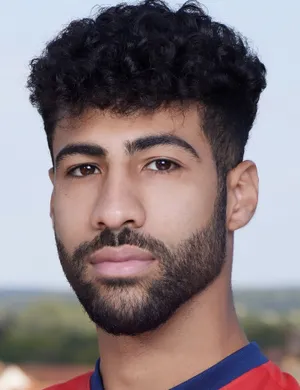
- Al-Dawoud with FC Eilenburg in 2024

Personal information
- Full name: Ibrahim Ahmed Abdul Qadir Al-Dawoud
- Date of birth: 14 July 2000 (age 26)
- Place of birth: Baghdad, Iraq
- Height: 1.75 m (5 ft 9 in)
- Position: Midfielder

Team information
- Current team: FK Velež Nevesinje
- Number: 10

Youth career
- 2015–2016: BK Trix Karlsborg
- 2016–2017: Tidaholms G&IF
- 2017–2018: Boo FF
- 2018–2019: AFC Eskilstuna

Senior career*
Years	Team	Apps	(Gls)
2017-2018	Boo FF	6	(2)
2018-2019	AFC Eskilstuna	5	(3)
2019–2020	IFK Eskilstuna	3	(1)
2019–2020	Södertälje FK	10	(5)
2020–2021	Värmbols FC	23	(7)
2021–2022	SV Dessau 05	12	(4)
2022–2023	MSV Pampow	35	(13)
2023–2024	FC Eilenburg	30	(6)
2024–2025	Al Nahda Sabha	9	(1)
2025-2026	Haras El Hodoud SC	1	
2026-2027	FK Velež Nevesinje	17	(3)

International career
2022	Palestine U23	4	(1)
- * Club domestic league appearances and goals as of 1 January 2025

Ibrahim Al-Dawoud (Arabic: ابراهيم احمد عبد القادر الداوود; born 14 July 2000) is a professional footballer who plays as a midfielder for First League of the Republika Srpska club FK Velež Nevesinje . Born in Iraq and raised in Sweden, he plays for the Palestine national team.

== Club career ==
Al-Dawoud began his football career in Sweden with BK Trix Karlsborg U19 during the 2015–16 season, finishing as the team’s top scorer with 26 goals. He continued his strong form in 2016–17 with Tidaholms G&IF U19, where he again finished as the club’s leading scorer with 21 goals.

In the 2017–18 season, Al-Dawoud represented both the U19 and senior teams of Boo FF. His performances earned him a move to AFC Eskilstuna in 2018, where he competed for the club’s U19 and U21 sides within the Allsvenskan youth system while also training with the first team.

In September 2019, he joined IFK Eskilstuna on loan and contributed to the club’s league-winning campaign by providing a decisive assist in the final match of the season.

Ahead of the 2019–20 season, Al-Dawoud signed for Södertälje FK. The season was later affected by the COVID-19 pandemic, resulting in a shortened competition schedule. He subsequently moved to Värmbols FC for the 2020–21 season, where he transitioned into a wingback role. His performances during this period earned him his first call-up to the Palestine national football team.

In 2021–2022, Al-Dawoud transferred to Germany, appearing in several matches for SV Dessau 05. Increased interest from clubs in higher divisions led to his signing with MSV Pampow for the 2022–2023 season in the Oberliga Nord. He delivered a standout season, finishing as the league’s top assist provider with 24 assists and recording a total of 37 score points.

During the 2023–2024 season, Al-Dawoud played for FC Eilenburg in the Regionalliga Nordost, contributing to the club’s successful effort to maintain its league status.

During the 2024–25 season, Al-Dawoud signed for Al Nahada Sabha in the Libyan Premier League. Throughout the campaign, he established himself as an important player for the club, delivering a number of strong performances and scoring one goal during the season.

in the middle of the 2025–26 season, Al-Dawoud completed a move to Haras El Hodoud SC, joining the club in the Egyptian Premier League.

On 20 August 2026, Al-Dawoud signed a professional contract with FK Velež Nevesinje of the Bosnian First LeagueFirst League of the Republika Srpska.

He joined the club to contribute his experience and technical ability in their promotion campaign to the Bosnian Premier League during the 2026–27 season, continuing his professional career after previous experiences in several European and Arab leagues.

== International career ==
In July 2023, Al-Dawoud received a call-up to play with the Palestine national under-23 team in the 2023 Arab Games in Constantine, Algeria.

== Personal life ==
Al-Dawoud was born in Iraq to Palestinian parents and raised in sweden ,where he developed a passion for football from an early age. Growing up between different cultures played an important role in shaping both his personality and career, contributing to his disciplined mentality and strong work ethic. Known for his determination, commitment, and team-oriented style of play, Al-Dawoud has built a reputation as a player who consistently gives his maximum effort on and off the pitch.
