= Kunstmann (surname) =

Kunstmann is a German surname. Notable people with the surname include:

- Antje Kunstmann (born 1949), German editor and publisher
- Doris Kunstmann (born 1941), German actress
- Ludwig Kunstmann (1877–1961), German sculptor
- Marcel Kunstmann (born 1988), German footballer

== See also ==
- Kunzmann, people bearing that surname
