= 2015–16 Verbandspokal =

Tournament details
- Country: Germany
- Teams: 42

The 2015–16 Verbandspokal, (English: 2015–16 Association Cup) consisted of twenty one regional cup competitions, the Verbandspokale, was the qualifying competition for the 2016–17 DFB-Pokal, the German Cup.

All clubs from the 3. Liga and below could enter the regional Verbandspokale, subject to the rules and regulations of each region. Clubs from the Bundesliga and 2. Bundesliga could not enter but were instead directly qualified for the first round of the DFB-Pokal. Reserve teams were not permitted to take part in the DFB-Pokal or the Verbandspokale. The precise rules of each regional Verbandspokal are laid down by the regional football association organising it.

All twenty one winners were qualified for the first round of the German Cup in the following season. Three additional clubs were also qualified for the first round of the German Cup, these being from the three largest state associations, Bavaria, Westphalia and Lower Saxony. The qualified teams are the runners-up of the Lower Saxony Cup. In Bavaria the best-placed Regionalliga Bayern non-reserve team is qualified for DFB-Pokal while in Westphalia a play-off is conducted to determine this club.

In February 2016 it was announced that German broadcaster ARD for the first time would show all 21 Verbandspokal finals live in a conference as well as live stream them and that all finals would be played on the same date, 28 May 2016. Some finals however were still scheduled for a different date.

== Competitions ==
The finals of the 2015–16 Verbandspokal competitions:

Cup	Date	Location	Team 1	Result	Team 2	Attendance	Report
Baden Cup (2015–16 season)	28 May 2016	Bammental	**FC Astoria Walldorf**	2–0	SpVgg Neckarelz		Report
Bavarian Cup (Note: As one of the three largest regional associations, Bavaria gets an additional DFB-Pokal berth, which goes to the best non-reserve team of the Regionalliga Bayern.) (2015–16 season)	28 May 2016	Unterhaching	SpVgg Unterhaching (Note: As Würzburger Kickers already qualified for the DFB-Pokal through its 3. Liga place, SpVgg Unterhaching qualified regardless of the outcome of the final.)	2–6	**Würzburger Kickers**	3,200	Report
Berlin Cup (2015–16 season)	28 May 2016	Berlin	SV Lichtenberg 47	0–1	**BFC Preussen**	3,874	Report
Brandenburg Cup (2015–16 season)	28 May 2016	Luckenwalde	FSV 63 Luckenwalde	1–3	**SV Babelsberg 03**	3,042	Report
Bremen Cup (2015–16 season)	28 May 2016	Bremen	**Bremer SV**	3–0	Blumenthaler SV		Report
Hamburg Cup (2015–16 season)	28 May 2016	Hamburg	**Eintracht Norderstedt**	4–1 (a.e.t.)	Altonaer FC von 1893		Report
Hessian Cup (2015–16 season)	4 May 2016	Haiger	SV Wehen Wiesbaden	1–2	**Kickers Offenbach**		Report
Lower Rhine Cup (2015–16 season)	28 May 2016	Essen	**Rot-Weiss Essen**	3–0	Wuppertaler SV	17,000	Report
Lower Saxony Cup (Note: As one of the three largest regional associations, Lower Saxony gets an additional DFB-Pokal berth, which goes to the losing cup finalist.) (2015–16 season)	28 May 2016	Barsinghausen	1. FC Germania Egestorf/Langreder	0–2	**SV Drochtersen/Assel**		Report
Mecklenburg-Vorpommern Cup (2015–16 season)	28 May 2016	Neustrelitz	**Hansa Rostock**	0–0 (a.e.t.) (4–3 p)	FC Schönberg 95	3,418	Report
Middle Rhine Cup (2015–16 season)	28 May 2016	Bonn	SC Fortuna Köln	1–1 (a.e.t.) (5–6 p)	**FC Viktoria Köln**	4,183	Report
Rhineland Cup (2015–16 season)	28 May 2016	Wissen	SG HWW Niederroßbach	1–5	**Eintracht Trier** (Note: As combined football sections of clubs like SG HWW Niederroßbach are not allowed entrance to the DFB-Pokal, Eintracht Trier qualified regardless of the outcome of the final.)	1,766	Report
Saarland Cup (2015–16 season)	4 May 2016	Dillingen/Saar	SV Elversberg	0–1	**FC 08 Homburg**		Report
Saxony Cup (2015–16 season)	10 May 2016	Aue	**FC Erzgebirge Aue**	1–0	FSV Zwickau (Note: As FC Erzgebirge Aue already qualified for the DFB-Pokal through its 3. Liga place, FSV Zwickau qualified regardless of the outcome of the final.)	7,560	Report
Saxony-Anhalt Cup (2015–16 season)	18 May 2016	Halle (Saale)	**Hallescher FC** (Note: As 1. FC Magdeburg already qualified for the DFB-Pokal through its 3. Liga place, Hallescher FC qualified regardless of the outcome of the final.)	2–1	1. FC Magdeburg	13,927	Report
Schleswig-Holstein Cup (2015–16 season)	28 May 2016	Lübeck	**VfB Lübeck**	2–1	ETSV Weiche Flensburg	3,500	Report
South Baden Cup (2015–16 season)	28 May 2016	Offenburg	SV Oberachern	3–5	**FC 08 Villingen**		Report
Southwestern Cup (2015–16 season)	28 May 2016	Römerberg	**SC Hauenstein**	2–1 (a.e.t.)	TSV Schott Mainz	1,002	Report
Thuringian Cup (2015–16 season)	28 May 2016	Jena	**FC Carl Zeiss Jena**	2–0	FC Rot-Weiß Erfurt	9,103	Report
Westphalian Cup (Note: As one of the three largest regional associations, Westphalia gets an additional DFB-Pokal berth, which goes to the winner of a play-off between the best-placed team in the Regionalliga West and the winner of the Oberliga Westfalen.) (2015–16 season)	28 May 2016	Ahlen	Rot Weiss Ahlen	0–3	**SG Wattenscheid 09**	3,008	Report
Württemberg Cup (2015–16 season)	28 May 2016	Stuttgart	FSV 08 Bissingen	2–5	**FV Ravensburg**	3,600	Report

Notes
Winners in bold

=== Clubs by league ===
The clubs qualified through the Verbandspokale for the 2016–17 DFB-Pokal by league:

League	Level	Clubs
3. Liga	3	Hallescher FC, F.C. Hansa Rostock
Regionalliga Bayern	4	SpVgg Unterhaching
Regionalliga Nord	4	SV Drochtersen/Assel, Eintracht Norderstedt, VfB Lübeck
Regionalliga Nordost	4	FSV Zwickau, SV Babelsberg 03, FC Carl Zeiss Jena
Regionalliga Südwest	4	FC 08 Homburg, Kickers Offenbach, Eintracht Trier, FC Astoria Walldorf
Regionalliga West	4	SG Wattenscheid 09, Rot-Weiss Essen, FC Viktoria Köln
Niedersachsenliga	5	1. FC Germania Egestorf/Langreder
Oberliga Baden-Württemberg	5	FC 08 Villingen, FV Ravensburg
Bremen-Liga	5	Bremer SV
Oberliga Rheinland-Pfalz/Saar	5	SC Hauenstein
Berlin-Liga	6	BFC Preußen Berlin

Note
Clubs who qualified as runners-up in italics
