= Kunzmann =

Kunzmann is a surname of German origin. Notable people with the surname include:

- Connie Kunzmann (1956–1981), American basketball player
- Ludmilla Kunzmann (1774–1843), Bohemian-Czech businesswoman
- Richard Kunzmann (born 1976), South African novelist of German-Namibian descent

== See also ==
- Lee Kunzman (1944–2025), American racing driver
- Kunstmann (surname), people bearing that surname
