= 2019–20 Verbandspokal =

Tournament details
- Country: Germany
- Teams: 44

The 2019–20 Verbandspokal, (English: 2019–20 Association Cup) consisted of twenty-one regional cup competitions, the Verbandspokale, the qualifying competition for the 2020–21 DFB-Pokal, the German Cup.

All clubs from the 3. Liga and below could enter the regional Verbandspokale, subject to the rules and regulations of each region. Clubs from the Bundesliga and 2. Bundesliga could not enter but were instead directly qualified for the first round of the DFB-Pokal. Reserve teams are not permitted to take part in the DFB-Pokal or the Verbandspokale. The precise rules of each regional Verbandspokal are laid down by the regional football association organising it.

All twenty-one winners qualified for the first round of the German Cup in the following season. Three additional clubs also qualified for the first round of the German Cup, these being from the three largest state associations, Bavaria, Westphalia and Lower Saxony. The Lower Saxony Cup was split into two paths, one for teams from the 3. Liga and the Regionalliga Nord and one for the teams from lower leagues. The winners of both paths qualified for the DFB-Pokal. In Bavaria the best-placed Regionalliga Bayern non-reserve team qualified for the DFB-Pokal while in Westphalia a play-off was conducted to determine this club.

The finals of the Verbandspokal competitions, originally scheduled for 23 May 2020, were postponed to later dates due to the COVID-19 pandemic in Germany. On 9 July, the new date was set for 22 August except in Bavaria, where its date was published six days later as 5 September.

== Competitions ==
The finals of the 2019–20 Verbandspokal competitions (winners listed in bold):

Cup	Date	Location	Team 1	Result	Team 2	Attendance	Report
Baden Cup (2019–20 season)	22 August 2020	Hoffenheim	FC Nöttingen	1–4	**Waldhof Mannheim**		Report
Bavarian Cup (Note: As one of the three largest regional associations, Bavaria gets an additional DFB-Pokal berth, which goes to the best non-reserve team of the Regionalliga Bayern.) (2019–20 season)	5 September 2020	Munich	**1860 Munich**	1–1 (4–1 p)	Würzburger Kickers		Report
Berlin Cup (2019–20 season)	22 August 2020	Berlin	Viktoria Berlin	0–6	**VSG Altglienicke**		Report
Brandenburg Cup (2019–20 season)	22 August 2020	Luckenwalde	**Union Fürstenwalde**	2–1	SV Babelsberg	729	Report
Bremen Cup (2019–20 season (until quarter-finals)) (2019–20 season (semi-finals and final))	22 August 2020	Bremen	Blumenthaler SV	2–2 (2–3 p)	**FC Oberneuland**		Report
Hamburg Cup (2019–20 season)	22 August 2020	Hamburg	**Eintracht Norderstedt**	5–1	TSV Sasel		Report
Hessian Cup (2019–20 season)	22 August 2020	Frankfurt	FSV Frankfurt	0–1	**TSV Steinbach Haiger**		Report
Lower Rhine Cup (2019–20 season)	22 August 2020	Essen	**Rot-Weiss Essen**	3–1	1. FC Kleve	300	Report
Lower Saxony Cup (Note: As one of the three largest regional associations, Lower Saxony gets an additional DFB-Pokal berth, which goes to the winner of the second cup path.) (2019–20 season (3. Liga / Regionalliga)) (2019–20 season (amateurs))	23 August 2020	Rehden	Schwarz-Weiß Rehden	1–4	**TSV Havelse**		Report
Lower Saxony Cup (2019–20 season (3. Liga / Regionalliga)) (2019–20 season (amateurs))	22 August 2020	Hanover	MTV Gifhorn	2–3	**Eintracht Celle**		Report
Mecklenburg-Vorpommern Cup (2019–20 season)	22 August 2020	Rostock	**Hansa Rostock**	3–0	Torgelower FC Greif	780	Report
Middle Rhine Cup (2019–20 season)	22 August 2020	Bonn	**1. FC Düren**	1–0	Alemannia Aachen	300	Report
Rhineland Cup (2019–20 season (until quarter-finals)) (2019–20 season (semi-finals and final))	22 August 2020	Koblenz	FC Karbach	0–5	**FV Engers**	350	Report
Saarland Cup (2019–20 season)	22 August 2020	Elversberg	FC 08 Homburg	2–2 (a.e.t.) (4–5 p)	**SV Elversberg**		Report
Saxony Cup (2019–20 season)	22 August 2020	Eilenburg	FC Eilenburg	1–2	**Chemnitzer FC**	1,000	Report
Saxony-Anhalt Cup (2019–20 season)	Abandoned (Note: The Saxony-Anhalt Cup was abandoned on 15 July 2020. 1. FC Magdeburg was awarded the DFB-Pokal berth.)						
Schleswig-Holstein Cup (2019–20 season)	22 August 2020	Malente	**SV Todesfelde**	3–2	VfB Lübeck	50	Report
South Baden Cup (2019–20 season)	22 August 2020	Freiburg	**1. FC Rielasingen-Arlen**	3–0	SV Oberachern		Report
Southwestern Cup (2019–20 season)	22 August 2020	Pirmasens	**1. FC Kaiserslautern**	0–0 (a.e.t.) (5–3 p)	Alemannia Waldalgesheim	400	Report
Thuringian Cup (2019–20 season)	22 August 2020	Jena	FSV Martinroda	2–8	**Carl Zeiss Jena**		Report
Westphalian Cup (Note: As one of the three largest regional associations, Westphalia gets an additional DFB-Pokal berth, which goes to the winner of a play-off between the best-placed team in the Regionalliga West and the winner of the Oberliga Westfalen.) (2019–20 season)	22 August 2020	Kamen	**RSV Meinerzhagen**	2–0	SV Schermbeck		Report
Württemberg Cup (2019–20 season)	22 August 2020	Stuttgart	TSG Balingen	0–3	**SSV Ulm**	300	Report
