= 2012–13 Regionalliga =

5th season of the Regionalliga

Regionalliga
- Season: 2012–13
- Champions: Holstein Kiel; RB Leipzig; Sportfreunde Lotte; KSV Hessen Kassel; 1860 Munich II
- Promoted: Holstein Kiel; RB Leipzig; SV Elversberg
- Biggest home win: Hannover 96 II 7–0 FC St. Pauli II (11 November 2012); TSV Havelse 7–0 Victoria Hamburg (3 March 2013)
- Biggest away win: SV Bergisch Gladbach 09 0–6 Borussia Mönchengladbach II (15 December 2012); MSV Duisburg II 0–6 FC Schalke 04 II (26 March 2013)
- Highest scoring: FC St. Pauli II 4–6 Hannover 96 II (4 May 2013)

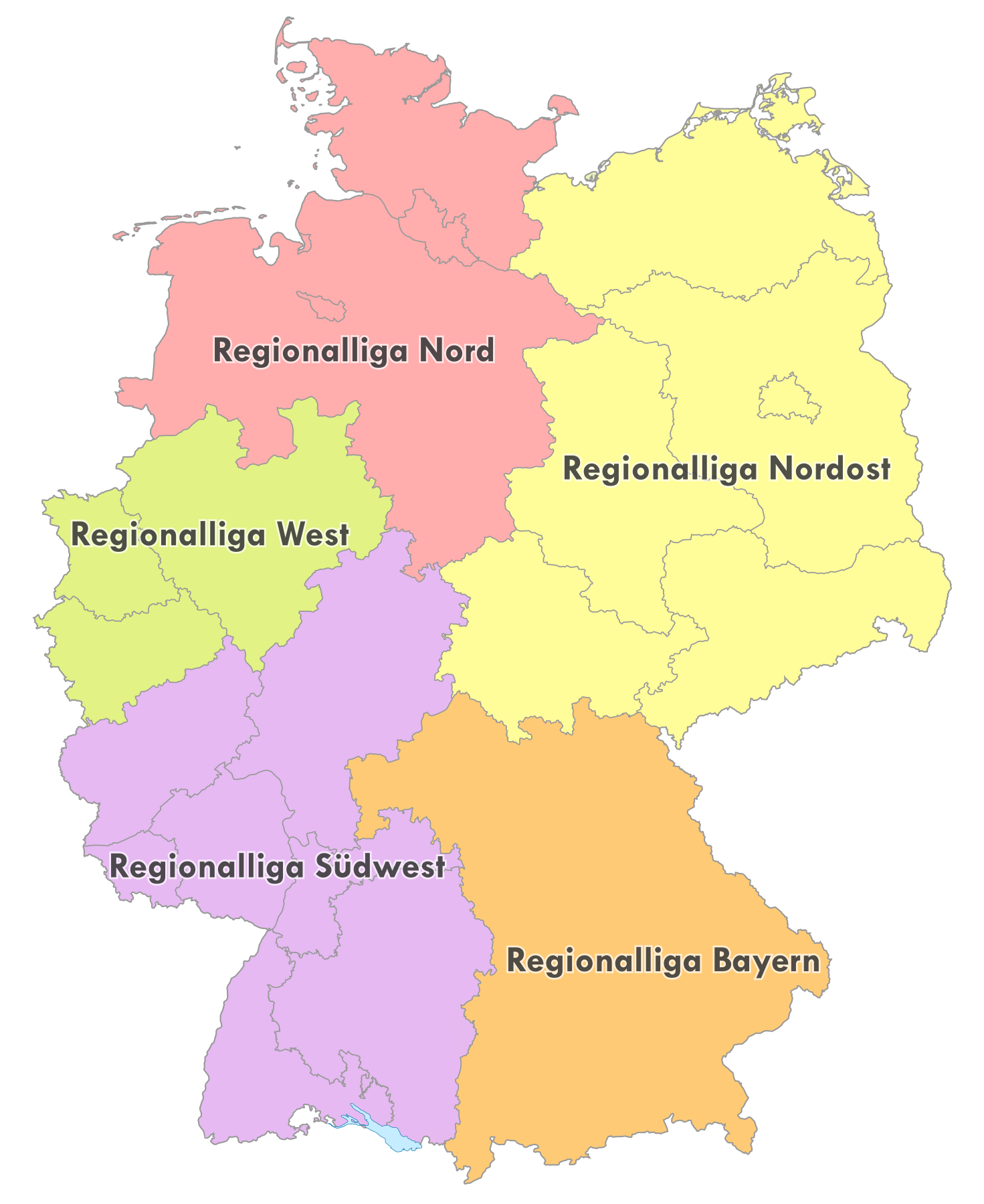
Map of the Regionalliga

The 2012–13 Regionalliga was the fifth season of the Regionalliga as the fourth tier of the German football league system. From this season onwards, the structure of this tier has changed. The three division format administrated by the German FA has been replaced by five leagues, each of which is administrated by its respective regional FA. Additionally, the leagues will be structured on geographical affiliation, in contrast to the partially arbitrary divisional alignment. League champions will qualify for a promotion play-off. Additionally, the Regionalliga Südwest runners-up will qualify.

== Regionalliga Nord ==
18 teams from Bremen, Hamburg, Lower Saxony and Schleswig-Holstein competed in the first season of the reformed Regionalliga Nord. Holstein Kiel won the championship and also won their promotion playoff, winning promotion to 3. Liga. Both VfB Lübeck and FC Oberneuland entered insolvency proceedings during the season; results involving these two teams were annulled. Kiel's promotion and the fact that no team was relegated from the 3. Liga meant that the number of relegated teams was reduced to just two.

=== League table ===
Pos	Team	Pld	W	D	L	GF	GA	GD	Pts	Qualification or relegation
1	Holstein Kiel (C, P)	30	20	7	3	74	27	+47	67	Qualification to promotion play-offs
2	TSV Havelse	30	19	6	5	61	20	+41	63	
3	VfL Wolfsburg II	30	16	8	6	49	20	+29	56	
4	Hannover 96 II	30	16	6	8	69	42	+27	54	
5	Werder Bremen II	30	14	6	10	65	44	+21	48	
6	VfR Neumünster	30	11	5	14	35	52	−17	38	
7	ETSV Weiche	30	9	10	11	38	48	−10	37	
8	Goslarer SC 08	30	10	6	14	52	61	−9	36	
9	BSV Schwarz-Weiß Rehden	30	9	8	13	51	57	−6	35	
10	VfB Oldenburg	30	8	11	11	38	48	−10	35	
11	SV Meppen	30	9	7	14	41	51	−10	34	
12	BV Cloppenburg	30	8	10	12	52	64	−12	34	
13	FC St. Pauli II	30	10	4	16	45	73	−28	34	
14	Hamburger SV II	30	8	7	15	36	53	−17	31	
15	SC Victoria Hamburg	30	9	3	18	39	75	−36	30	Possible relegation to Oberliga (Note: Depending how many teams are relegated from the 3.Liga & the promotion results of the champion, four teams could be relegated.)
16	SV Wilhelmshaven (Note: SV Wilhelmshaven had 6 points deducted due to a ruling of the FIFA disciplinary commission.)	30	9	6	15	35	49	−14	27	Relegation to Oberliga (Note: SV Wilhelmshaven was re-instated when Holstein Kiel was promoted to the 3.Liga.)
17	FC Oberneuland (R)	0	0	0	0	0	0	0	0	Relegation to Oberliga (Note: VfB Lübeck entered insolvency proceedings on 1 January 2013; match results annulled. Also, FC Oberneuland entered insolvency proceedings on 16 May 2013; match results annulled.)
18	VfB Lübeck (R)	0	0	0	0	0	0	0	0	Relegation to Oberliga

Source: kicker.de
Rules for classification: 1) points; 2) goal difference; 3) number of goals scored.
(C) Champions; (P) Promoted; (R) Relegated

=== Top goalscorer ===
Rank	Player	Club	Goals
1	Rogier Krohne	BV Cloppenburg	24
2	Deniz Kadah	Hannover 96 II	18
2	Marcel Schied	Holstein Kiel	18
4	Marc Vucinovic	TSV Havelse	16
5	Johannes Wurtz	Werder Bremen II	15

== Regionalliga Nordost ==
16 teams from Berlin, Brandenburg, Mecklenburg-Vorpommern, Saxony, Saxony-Anhalt and Thuringia competed in the first season of the reformed Regionalliga Nordost. RB Leipzig won the league, suffering no defeats, and also won their promotion playoff, gaining promotion to 3. Liga. As SV Babelsberg 03 was relegated from 3. Liga and Leipzig won promotion, the standard two teams were relegated. In FC Carl Zeiss Jena, 1. FC Lok Leipzig and 1. FC Magdeburg, this fourth-tier league contains three teams that have been finalists in European competitions, Magdeburg even winning the 1974 European Cup Winners' Cup.

=== League table ===
Pos	Team	Pld	W	D	L	GF	GA	GD	Pts	Qualification or relegation
1	RB Leipzig (C, P)	30	21	9	0	65	22	+43	72	Qualification to promotion play-offs
2	FC Carl Zeiss Jena	30	16	10	4	54	28	+26	58	
3	FSV Zwickau	30	13	14	3	44	14	+30	53	
4	Berliner AK 07	30	13	14	3	37	18	+19	53	
5	Hertha BSC II	30	14	4	12	46	39	+7	46	
6	1. FC Magdeburg	30	12	9	9	42	41	+1	45	
7	ZFC Meuselwitz	30	13	6	11	37	40	−3	45	
8	TSG Neustrelitz	30	10	10	10	41	39	+2	40	
9	Germania Halberstadt	30	8	14	8	31	34	−3	38	
10	1. FC Lok Leipzig	30	9	9	12	35	39	−4	36	
11	Optik Rathenow	30	9	8	13	35	46	−11	35	
12	1. FC Union Berlin II	30	7	10	13	36	43	−7	31	
13	VFC Plauen	30	6	11	13	42	52	−10	29	
14	VfB Auerbach	30	6	10	14	35	48	−13	28	
15	FC Energie Cottbus II (R)	30	3	11	16	26	53	−27	20	Relegation to Oberliga
16	Torgelower SV Greif (R)	30	2	7	21	19	69	−50	13	Relegation to Oberliga

Source: kicker.de
Rules for classification: 1) points; 2) goal difference; 3) number of goals scored.
(C) Champions; (P) Promoted; (R) Relegated

=== Top goalscorer ===
Rank	Player	Club	Goals
1	Daniel Frahn	RB Leipzig	20
2	Marc-Philipp Zimmermann	VFC Plauen	12
3	André Luge	FSV Zwickau	11
3	Murat Turhan	FSV Optik Rathenow	11
5	Stefan Kellig	FSV Zwickau	10
5	Marcel Schuch	VfB Auerbach	10
5	Manuel Starke	ZFC Meuselwitz	10

== Regionalliga West ==
20 teams from North Rhine-Westphalia competed in the first season of the reformed Regionalliga West.

=== League table ===
Pos	Team	Pld	W	D	L	GF	GA	GD	Pts	Qualification or relegation
1	Sportfreunde Lotte (C)	38	26	8	4	70	27	+43	86	Qualification to promotion play-offs
2	SC Fortuna Köln	38	25	4	9	69	33	+36	79	
3	FC Schalke 04 II	38	20	8	10	61	40	+21	68	
4	Rot-Weiss Essen	38	19	9	10	63	50	+13	66	
5	Sportfreunde Siegen	38	19	7	12	58	43	+15	64	
6	FC Viktoria Köln	38	18	7	13	75	66	+9	61	
7	Borussia Mönchengladbach II	38	17	6	15	56	50	+6	57	
8	Rot-Weiß Oberhausen	38	16	5	17	54	56	−2	53	
9	SC Wiedenbrück 2000	38	15	6	17	56	56	0	51	
10	SC Verl	38	13	11	14	68	56	+12	50	
11	Bayer 04 Leverkusen II	38	14	8	16	48	51	−3	50	
12	Fortuna Düsseldorf II	38	12	11	15	43	48	−5	47	
13	SSVg Velbert	38	13	8	17	43	57	−14	47	
14	VfL Bochum II	38	11	13	14	47	42	+5	46	
15	Wuppertaler SV Borussia (Note: With no promotion from the Oberliga Mittelrhein & Wuppertaler SV Borussia (now Wuppertaler SV) entering insolvency proceedings; FC Köln II was re-instated.) (R)	38	11	13	14	52	55	−3	46	Possible relegation to Oberliga (Note: Depending how many teams are relegated from the 3.Liga & the promotion results of the champion, six teams could be relegated.)
16	1. FC Köln II	38	11	9	18	60	61	−1	42	Relegation to Oberliga
17	VfB Hüls (R)	38	12	6	20	48	71	−23	42	Relegation to Oberliga
18	SV Bergisch Gladbach 09 (R)	38	11	6	21	47	74	−27	39	Relegation to Oberliga
19	MSV Duisburg II (R)	38	8	10	20	33	68	−35	34	Relegation to Oberliga
20	FC Kray (R)	38	9	5	24	33	80	−47	32	Relegation to Oberliga

Source: kicker.de
Rules for classification: 1) points; 2) goal difference; 3) number of goals scored.
(C) Champions; (R) Relegated

=== Top goalscorer ===
Rank	Player	Club	Goals
1	Sven Michel	Sportfreunde Siegen / Borussia Mönchengladbach II	20
2	Christian Erwig	VfB Hüls	19
3	Thomas Kraus	Fortuna Köln	17
4	Marcel Kunstmann	SC Verl	16
4	Volkan Okumak	VfB Hüls / SC Wiedenbrück 2000	16
5	Mike Wunderlich	Viktoria Köln	16

== Regionalliga Südwest ==
19 teams from Bavaria, Baden-Württemberg, Hesse, Rhineland-Palatinate and Saarland competed in the first season of the newly formed Regionalliga Südwest.

=== League table ===
Pos	Team	Pld	W	D	L	GF	GA	GD	Pts	Qualification or relegation
1	KSV Hessen Kassel (C)	36	20	10	6	56	36	+20	70	Qualification to promotion play-offs
2	SV Elversberg (P)	36	20	5	11	59	44	+15	65	Qualification to promotion play-offs
3	1. FC Kaiserslautern II	36	16	12	8	56	38	+18	60	
4	SG Sonnenhof Großaspach	36	15	13	8	62	36	+26	58	
5	Eintracht Trier	36	15	12	9	50	44	+6	57	
6	Waldhof Mannheim	36	14	10	12	47	35	+12	52	
7	SC Freiburg II	36	13	13	10	61	48	+13	52	
8	TuS Koblenz	36	14	10	12	46	44	+2	52	
9	1899 Hoffenheim II	36	14	9	13	62	45	+17	51	
10	SSV Ulm 1846	36	15	6	15	46	46	0	51	
11	1. FSV Mainz 05 II	36	13	10	13	55	56	−1	49	
12	Wormatia Worms	36	10	14	12	49	51	−2	44	
13	SC Pfullendorf	36	11	10	15	40	49	−9	43	
14	FC 08 Homburg	36	12	7	17	51	64	−13	43	Possible relegation to Oberliga (Note: Depending how many teams are relegated from the 3.Liga & the promotion results of the champion, up to six teams could be relegated; 1. FC Eschborn & FSV Frankfurt relegated because KSV Hessen Kassel did not win promotion to 3.Liga & SV Darmstadt 98 was relegated from 3.Liga.)
15	Eintracht Frankfurt II	36	12	4	20	48	54	−6	40	Possible relegation to Oberliga
16	1. FC Eschborn (R)	36	10	10	16	43	56	−13	40	Possible relegation to Oberliga
17	FSV Frankfurt II (R)	36	11	7	18	38	62	−24	40	Possible relegation to Oberliga
18	SC Idar-Oberstein (R)	36	7	14	15	41	57	−16	35	Relegation to Oberliga
19	Bayern Alzenau (R)	36	6	10	20	43	86	−43	28	Relegation to Oberliga

Source: kicker.del
Rules for classification: 1) points; 2) goal difference; 3) number of goals scored.
(C) Champions; (P) Promoted; (R) Relegated

=== Top goalscorer ===
Rank	Player	Club	Goals
1	Jerome Assauer	TuS Koblenz	20
2	Chhunly Pagenburg	Eintracht Trier	18
3	Abedin Krasniqi	SV Elversberg	15
3	Andreas Ludwig	1899 Hoffenheim II	16
5	Petar Sliskovic	1. FSV Mainz 05	15

== Regionalliga Bayern ==
20 teams from Bavaria competed in the first season of the newly formed Regionalliga Bayern.

=== League table ===
Pos	Team	Pld	W	D	L	GF	GA	GD	Pts	Qualification or relegation
1	TSV 1860 München II (C)	38	25	5	8	69	35	+34	80	Qualification to promotion play-offs
2	Bayern Munich II	38	21	10	7	71	31	+40	73	
3	FV Illertissen	38	21	9	8	74	44	+30	72	
4	1. FC Nürnberg II	38	19	8	11	64	40	+24	65	
5	SV Heimstetten	38	16	13	9	61	53	+8	61	
6	TSV Buchbach	38	18	6	14	73	56	+17	60	
7	TSV 1860 Rosenheim	38	17	7	14	43	44	−1	58	
8	FC Ingolstadt 04 II	38	15	10	13	69	57	+12	55	
9	FC Memmingen	38	15	10	13	45	39	+6	55	
10	Würzburger Kickers	38	14	10	14	63	76	−13	52	
11	TSV Rain am Lech	38	14	7	17	51	59	−8	49	
12	SpVgg Greuther Fürth II	38	13	9	16	49	56	−7	48	
13	FC Eintracht Bamberg	38	12	11	15	48	64	−16	47	
14	SV Seligenporten	38	14	3	21	53	72	−19	45	
15	Viktoria Aschaffenburg	38	12	6	20	45	71	−26	42	
16	FC Augsburg II (O)	38	11	8	19	57	66	−9	41	Qualification to relegation play-offs
17	Bayern Hof (O)	38	10	10	18	39	56	−17	40	Qualification to relegation play-offs
18	SC Eltersdorf (R)	38	10	9	19	50	70	−20	39	Relegation to Bayernliga
19	FC Ismaning (R)	38	8	12	18	38	48	−10	36	Relegation to Bayernliga
20	VfL Frohnlach (R)	38	8	11	19	40	64	−24	35	Relegation to Bayernliga

Source: kicker.de
Rules for classification: 1st points; 2nd head-to-head points; 3rd head-to-head goal difference; 4th head-to-head goals scored; 5th head-to-head goals scored away from home (only if two teams are tied in points); 6th goal difference; 7th number of goals scored; 8th wins; 9th goals scored away from home; 10th drawing of lots
(C) Champions; (O) Play-off winners; (R) Relegated

=== Top goalscorer ===
Rank	Player	Club	Goals
1	Andreas Neumeyer	SV Heimstetten	24
2	Bernd Rosinger	SV Seligenporten / 1. FC Nuremberg II	22
2	Markus Ziereis	1860 Munich II	22
4	Karl-Heinz Lappe	FC Ingolstadt II	21
5	Stefan Lex	TSV Buchbach / SpVgg Greuther Fürth II	17

== Promotion play-offs ==
The draw for the 2012–13 promotion play-offs was held on 12 May 2013.

=== Summary ===
The first legs were played on 29 May, and the second legs were played on 2 and 4 June 2013.

Team 1	Agg.	Team 2	1st leg	2nd leg
RB Leipzig (NO)	4–2	Sportfreunde Lotte (W)	2–0	2–2 (a.e.t.)
Holstein Kiel (N)	4–1	Hessen Kassel (S1)	2–0	2–1
SV Elversberg (S2)	4–3	1860 Munich II (B)	3–2	1–1

=== Matches ===
All times Central European Summer Time (UTC+2)

29 May 2013
17:30

RB Leipzig	2–0	Sportfreunde Lotte
Kutschke 47' (pen.); Morys 84'	Report

Red Bull Arena, Leipzig
Attendance: 30,104
Referee: Bibiana Steinhaus
2 June 2013
14:00

Sportfreunde Lotte	2–2 (a.e.t.)	RB Leipzig
Willers 26'; Schmidt 90+5'	Report	Willers 95' (o.g.); Kutschke 110' (pen.)

ConnectM-Arena, Lotte
Attendance: 5,604
Referee: Thorsten Schriever

RB Leipzig won 4–2 on aggregate.

29 May 2013
18:30

Holstein Kiel	2–0	Hessen Kassel
Sykora 30'; Wetter 52'	Report

Holstein-Stadion, Kiel
Attendance: 9,382
Referee: Robert Kempter
2 June 2013
14:00

Hessen Kassel	1–2	Holstein Kiel
Müller 45'	Report	Heider 20'; Gebers 60'

Auestadion, Kassel
Attendance: 17,000
Referee: Markus Wingenbach

Holstein Kiel won 4–1 on aggregate.

29 May 2013
18:30

SV Elversberg	3–2	1860 Munich II
Wenzel 12'; Krasniqi 23'; Deville 49'	Report	Maier 3'; Aygün 21'

Waldstadion an der Kaiserlinde, Spiesen-Elversberg
Attendance: 3,800
Referee: Marcel Unger
4 June 2013 (Note: The 1860 Munich II v SV Elversberg match, originally scheduled on 2 June 2013, 14:00 CEST, was postponed until two days later due to adverse weather conditions.)
20:00

1860 Munich II	1–1	SV Elversberg
Aygün 40'	Report	Krasniqi 84'

Allianz Arena, Munich
Attendance: 14,500
Referee: Sascha Stegemann

SV Elversberg won 4–3 on aggregate.
