= Volker Finke =

German football manager

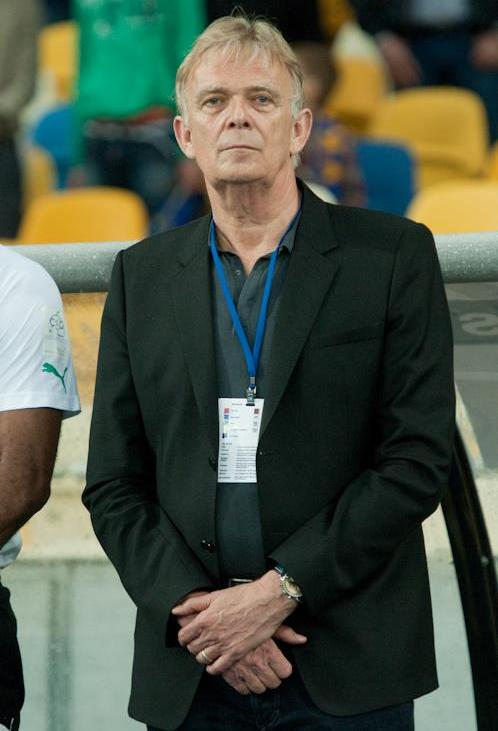
- Finke in 2013

Personal information
- Date of birth: 24 March 1948 (age 78)
- Place of birth: Nienburg, Germany
- Position: Midfielder

Senior career*
Years	Team	Apps	(Gls)
1967–1969	TSV Havelse		
1969–1975	Hannoverscher SC		

Managerial career
- 1975–1986: TSV Stelingen
- 1986–1990: TSV Havelse
- 1990–1991: SC Norderstedt
- 1991–2007: SC Freiburg
- 2008–2010: Urawa Red Diamonds
- 2010–2012: 1. FC Köln (Director of Sport)
- 2011: 1. FC Köln (interim)
- 2013–2015: Cameroon
- * Club domestic league appearances and goals

Volker Finke (German pronunciation: [ˈfɔlkɐ ˈfɪŋkə]; born 24 March 1948) is a German former football manager and a former player. He was the coach of SC Freiburg for 16 years.

== Coaching career ==
=== Early career ===
Finke was a player–coach for TSV Stelingen from 1 July 1974 to 12 February 1986. He was head coach of TSV Havelse from 13 February 1986 to 9 October 1990. Finke was head coach of SC Norderstedt.

=== SC Freiburg ===
Finke became head coach of SC Freiburg on 1 July 1991. His first match as head coach of Freiburg was a 2–1 win against 1860 Munich. Freiburg finished in third place 1991–92 2. Bundesliga season and were knocked out of the 2nd round of the German Cup. Freiburg started the 1992–93 season with a 2. Bundesliga match against VfB Oldenburg on 11 July 1992, which finished in a 2–2 draw. Freiburg won the 2. Bundesliga in the 1992–93 season, won promotion to the 1993–94 Bundesliga, and were knocked out of the German Cup in the second round. Freiburg started the 1993–94 season with a first round match in the German Cup, which they won 8–0. They went all the way to the quarter–finals where they were knocked–out by Tennis Borussia Berlin. Freiburg finished the 1993–94 Bundesliga in 15th place, one spot above the relegation zone. The 1994–95 season started with a 3–1 loss to Stuttgarter Kickers in the first round of the German Cup. Freiburg's 1994–95 Bundesliga season included a 5–1 win against Bayern Munich on 23 August 1994. They wrapped up the 1994–95 season on 17 June 1995 with a 2–1 win against FC Schalke 04. Freiburg finished in 3rd place in the Bundesliga and qualified for the UEFA Cup. Finke finished with a record of 244 wins, 143 draws, and 220 losses.

=== Urawa Red Diamonds ===
Finke was head coach of Urawa Red Diamonds between 1 January 2009 and 31 January 2011. Finke's first match of the Urawa Red Diamonds was a 1–0 loss to the Yokohama F. Marinos. Urawa Red Diamonds finished the 2008 season in seventh place. They also got to the semi–finals of the AFC Champions League. During the 2009 season, Urawa Red Diamonds finished in sixth place. 2010 season marked Finke's final season as head coach of the Urawa Red Diamonds. His final match as head coach was a 4–0 loss to Vissel Kobe. Urawa Red Diamonds finished the season in 10th place.

=== 1. FC Köln ===
On 18 December 2010, Finke was named as the new director of sport by 1. FC Köln effective on 1 February 2011. Effective on 27 April 2011, Finke additionally became interim coach until the end of the season and won all three matches. On 10 March 2012, Köln parted company with Finke by mutual consent after a 1–0 win over Hertha BSC.

=== Cameroon ===
On 22 May 2013, he was named as head coach of Cameroon. His first match was a 1–0 loss in a friendly match against Tanzania. Cameroon lost all 3 matches at the 2014 FIFA World Cup. They lost 1–0 to Mexico, 4–0 to Croatia, and 4–1 to Brazil. He was sacked on 30 October 2015, two weeks before the 2018 FIFA World Cup qualification phase started. His final match as Cameroon's coach was a 0–0 draw against Congo.

== Coaching record ==
Team	From	To	Record					Ref.
Team	From	To	M	W	D	L	Win %	Ref.
SC Freiburg	1 July 1991	30 June 2007	587	224	143	220	38.16	
Urawa Red Diamonds	1 January 2009	31 January 2011	132	56	25	51	42.42	
1. FC Köln	27 April 2011	30 June 2011	3	3	0	0	100.00	
Cameroon	22 May 2013	30 October 2015	37	15	14	8	40.54	
Total			759	298	182	279	39.26	—

== Honours ==
=== Manager ===
SC Freiburg

- 2. Bundesliga: 1992–93, 2002–03

== See also ==
- List of longest managerial reigns in association football
