= Willi Fricke =

German footballer

Personal information
- Full name: Willi Fricke
- Date of birth: 6 January 1913
- Place of birth: Hanover, Germany
- Date of death: 15 June 1963 (aged 50)
- Position: Defender

Senior career*
Years	Team	Apps	(Gls)
1928–1938	SV Arminia Hannover		
1938–1952	Eintracht Braunschweig	108	(1)

International career
1935	Germany	1	(0)
- * Club domestic league appearances and goals

Willi Fricke (6 January 1913 - 15 June 1963) was a German footballer who played for SV Arminia Hannover and Eintracht Braunschweig. He was also capped once for the Germany national team, in a friendly against Luxembourg.
