= Murat Salar =

Turkish footballer

Personal information
- Full name: Hikmet Murat Salar
- Date of birth: 23 November 1976 (age 49)
- Place of birth: Hildesheim, West Germany
- Height: 1.78 m (5 ft 10 in)
- Position: Attacking midfielder

Team information
- Current team: VSG Altglienicke (manager)

Youth career
- 1991–1994: Werder Bremen

Senior career*
| Years | Team | Apps | (Gls) |
| 1994–1996 | Werder Bremen II | | |
| 1996–1998 | Bursaspor | 0 | (0) |
| 1996–1997 | → Balıkesirspor (loan) | 14 | (3) |
| 1998–2000 | Hertha BSC II | | |
| 2000 | Gaziantepspor | 6 | (0) |
| 2001–2002 | Türkiyemspor Berlin | | |
| 2002–2003 | Gençlerbirliği | 16 | (1) |
| 2003–2004 | Diyarbakırspor | 23 | (3) |
| 2004–2005 | Tennis Borussia Berlin | 26 | (2) |
| 2005 | Çaykur Rizespor | 4 | (0) |
| 2006 | Altay | 6 | (0) |
| 2006–2007 | Adana Demirspor | 32 | (6) |
| 2007 | Orduspor | 0 | (0) |
| 2007–2008 | Tarsus Idman Yurdu | 19 | (1) |
| 2008–2011 | VfV Borussia 06 Hildesheim | 66 | (23) |
| 2011 | FC Oberneuland | 14 | (6) |

International career
| 1994 | Turkey U-18 | 4 | (1) |

Managerial career
- 2014–2015: KFC Uerdingen 05
- 2016–2019: SV Arminia Hannover
- 2019: TSC Vahdet Braunschweig
- 2019–2021: SV Newroz Hildesheim
- 2023: CFC Hertha 06
- 2023–: VSG Altglienicke
- * Club domestic league appearances and goals

Hikmet Murat Salar (born 23 November 1976) is a Turkish former professional footballer and currently manager of VSG Altglienicke.

Salar, born to an Egyptian mother and Turkish father in Germany, played a total of 49 Süper Lig games throughout his footballing career in Turkey. Despite having won 4 caps for the Turkish U-18 team in 1994, Salar later expressed an interest in playing for the Egyptian national side. He scored his only goal in the Turkey national under-18 football team jersey in a match against Romania on 6 October 1994.

== Managerial career ==
On 22 April 2014, Salar was named new manager of German club KFC Uerdingen 05. He also continued to play for TSC Vahdet Braunschweig in the sixth-tier Landesliga Braunschweig. With the club facing relegation from the 2014–15 Regionalliga he was sacked as Uerdingen manager on 18 May 2015.

In April 2016 he was named new manager of SV Arminia Hannover.

In September 2019 he became manager of TSC Vahdet Braunschweig, but he left the club again in December 2019. He left in order to become manager of SV Newroz Hildesheim.

Salar left SV Newroz in July 2021. In September 2023 he was announced as new manager of CFC Hertha 06. Two months later he left the club in order to become new manager of VSG Altglienicke.
