= Eduard Wolpers =

German footballer

Personal information
- Date of birth: 24 August 1900
- Place of birth: Hanover, Germany
- Date of death: 23 November 1976 (aged 76)
- Position: Forward

Senior career*
Years	Team	Apps	(Gls)
1919–1926	SV Arminia Hannover		
1926–1927	Hamburger SV		
1927–1940	SV Arminia Hannover		

International career
1926	Germany	1	(0)
- * Club domestic league appearances and goals

Eduard Wolpers (24 August 1900 – 23 November 1976) was a German international footballer.
