= Württemberg Cup =

WFV-Pokal
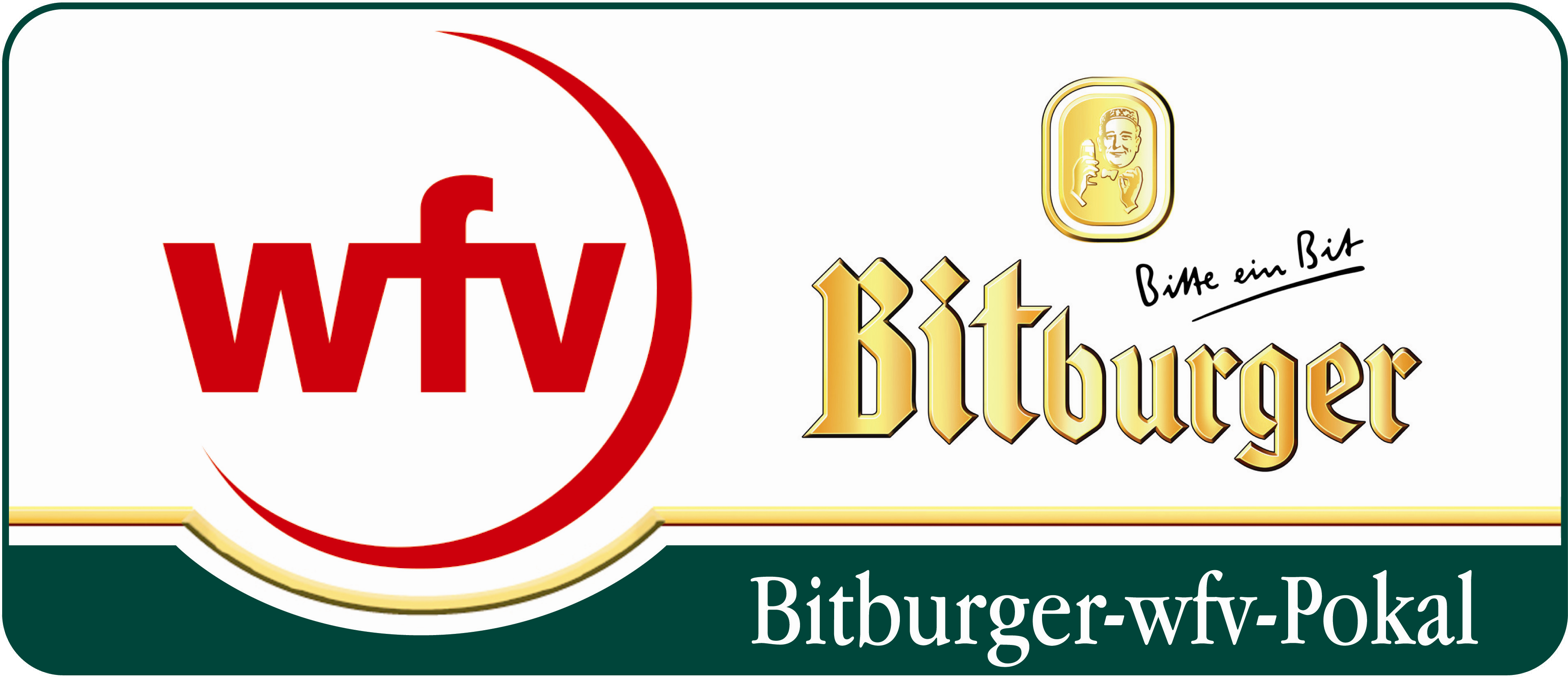
- Founded: 1945
- Region: Baden-Württemberg
- Current champions: Sonnenhof Großaspach (2025–26)
- Most championships: SSV Ulm (11 titles)
- Website: wuerttfv.de

The Bitburger-wfv-Pokal is one of the 21 regional cup competitions of German football. The winner of the competition gains entry to the first round of the German Cup. It was introduced in 1945. In 2011 the cup was renamed from WFV-Pokal into Bitburger-wfv-Pokal because of a new name sponsoring by the brewery Bitburger. WFV stands for Württembergischer Fußball-Verband (football association of the region Württemberg).

== History ==
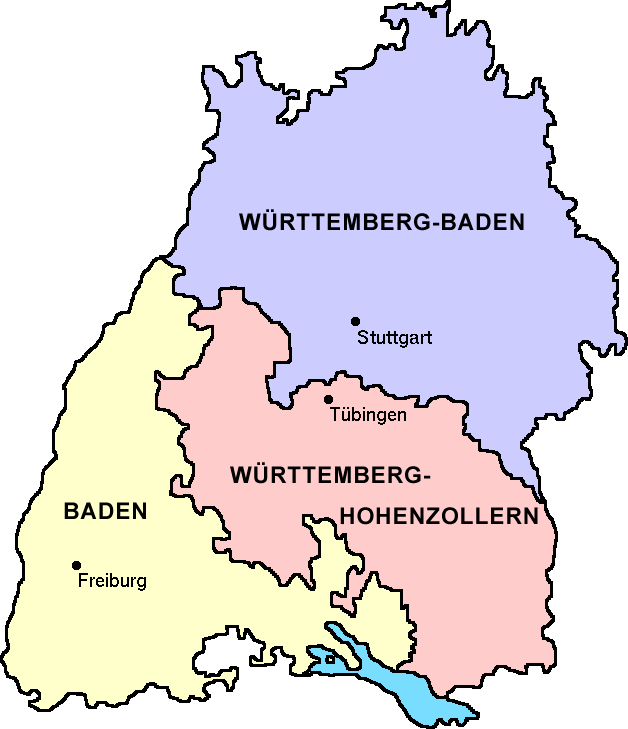
The three states that merged to form Baden-Württemberg in 1952

The competition was established in 1945 in the Württemberg part of Württemberg-Baden and in Württemberg-Hohenzollern. In 1952, these two states merged with South Baden to form Baden-Württemberg but three separate football associations, Württemberg, Baden and South Baden, remained and also their regional cups.

Initially, the final was held at a neutral ground but from 1967 onwards, one of the two finalists received home advantage. Occasionally, it would however still be held at a neutral venue when the club with the home advantage didn't have a suitable stadium. After 1981, the competitions final returned to a neutral venue.

From 1974 onwards, the winner of the WFV Cup qualified for the first round of the German Cup. At times, the WFV was permitted to send both, winner and finalist to the first round of the German Cup, currently (2008–09), it is only the winner as Württemberg is not one of the three largest federations, which are permitted to send two clubs.

Possibly the most remarkable WFV-Cup winner in terms of German Cup appearance was the SC Geislingen in 1984–85. The club drew Hamburger SV for the first round and beat the Bundesliga club 2–0, then defeated Kickers Offenbach 4–2 to go out in the third round 0–2 to the later winners Bayer Uerdingen.

== Modus ==
Professional clubs are not permitted to enter the competition, meaning, no teams from the Bundesliga and the 2. Bundesliga can compete.

All clubs from Württemberg playing from the 3. Liga to the four Landesligas (VII) gain direct entry to the first round. To make up the set number of 128 clubs for the first round, the best teams from the Bezirkspokale, which teams below tier seven play in, are also admitted.

== Cup finals ==
Held annually at the end of season, these were the cup finals since 1950:

Season	Location	Winner	Finalist	Result	Attendance
1950–51	Schorndorf, 26 August 1951	ESC Ulm	TSG Öhringen	3–0	1,500
1951–53	not held				
1953–54	Echterdingen, 15 August 1954	FV 09 Nürtingen	Stuttgarter SC	3–2	1,500
1954–55	Tübingen, 23 July 1955	Stuttgarter SC	SpVgg Trossingen	5–0	2,000
1955–56	Sindelfingen, 28 July 1956	1. FC Eislingen	Union Böckingen	1–0	1,200
1956–57	Geislingen, 30 June 1957	SSV Ulm	1. FC Eislingen	5–2	2,000
1957–58	Munderkingen, 22 November 1958	FC Urbach	FC Wangen	3–1	600
1958–59	no final played				
1959–60	Hechingen, 19 November 1960	VfR Schwenningen	TV Echterdingen	4–3	700
1960–61	Metzingen, 21 April 1961	VfL Kirchheim/Teck	TSV Eningen	7–1	2,000
1961–62	Esslingen, 12 August 1962	Germania Bietigheim	FV 09 Nürtingen	2–0	2,000
1962–63	Heidenheim, 11 August 1963	FV Illertissen	SV Hussenhofen	3–1	2,000
1963–64	Echterdingen, 12 July 1964	SpVgg Neckarsulm	SV Spaichingen	3–2	2,000
1964–65	Kirchheim/Teck, 27 June 1965	VfL Heidenheim	Stuttgarter SC	3–2	1,200
1965–66	Biberach, 9 July 1966	SpVgg Lindau	TSG Backnang	5–3	2,000
1966–67	Saulgau, 1 July 1967	TG Biberach	SC Schwenningen	6–2	1,300
1967–68	Lindau, 29 June 1968	SpVgg Lindau	Union Böckingen	1–0 aet	1,500
1968–69	Tübingen, 21 June 1969	SpVgg Neckarsulm	SSV Reutlingen II	4–2 aet	1,500
1969–70	Schwäbisch Gmünd, 28 June 1970	VfB Stuttgart II	VfL Heidenheim	4–3 after pen.	7,000
1970–71	Ravensburg, 3 July 1971	VfL Sindelfingen	FV Ravensburg	4–2 after pen.	2,500
1971–72	Ravensburg, 2 July 1972	VfR Aalen	FV Ravensburg	5–3	2,000
1972–73	Weingarten, 7 July 1973	TV Gültstein	SV Weingarten	1–0	2,000
1973–74	Ludwigsburg, 12 June 1974	SpVgg Ludwigsburg	VfB Stuttgart II	5–3 after pen.	1,7000
1974–75	Freudenstadt, 29 March 1975	SpVgg Freudenstadt	SpVgg Lindau	2–1 after pen.	1,4000
1975–76	Göppingen, 30 May 1976	TV Unterboihingen	SSV Ulm 1846	4–3 after pen.	1,500
1976–77	Schwäbisch Gmünd, 4 June 1977	1. FC Normannia Gmünd	Heidenheimer SB	2–1	2,200
1977–78	Böckingen, 7 May 1978	1. FC Eislingen	Union Böckingen	3–2 aet	1,500
1978–79	Aalen, 4 June 1979	VfR Aalen	FV Biberach	1–0	1,500
1979–80	Stuttgart, 30 April 1980	VfB Stuttgart II	VfR Heilbronn	3–2	400
1980–81	Ludwigsburg, 20 May 1981	VfB Stuttgart II	SpVgg Ludwigsburg	2–1 aet	2,700
1981–82	Kirchheim/Teck, 18 May 1982	SSV Ulm 1846	VfB Stuttgart II	2–0 aet	1,500
1982–83	Ulm, 18 May 1983	SSV Ulm 1846	SV Göppingen	3–1	700
1983–84	Geislingen, 8 May 1984	SC Geislingen	TSV Ofterdingen	2–1	1,500
1984–85	Wangen, 1 June 1985	FV Ebingen	FC Wangen	4–3	1,800
1985–86	Heidenheim, 19 May 1986	VfR Aalen	TSG Giengen	7–6 after pen.	3,500
1986–87	Heidenheim, 3 June 1987	TSG Giengen	VfR Aalen	5–1	2,000
1987–88	Nürtingen, 19 May 1988	SSV Reutlingen	VfL Kirchheim/Teck	4–2	1,900
1988–89	Illertissen, 10 May 1989	SC Geislingen	FC Wangen	3–0	600
1989–90	Reutlingen, 1 May 1990	SSV Reutlingen	FC Wangen	3–0	2,100
1990–91	Reutlingen, 20 May 1991	TSG Backnang	SSV Reutlingen	2–1	1,500
1991–92	Ulm, 19 May 1992	SSV Ulm 1846	VfR Aalen	3–2	800
1992–93	Ditzingen, 2 June 1993	TSF Ditzingen	SV Böblingen	3–2	1,200
1993–94	Ulm, 3 May 1994	SSV Ulm 1846	TSF Ditzingen	6–0	1,000
1994–95	Ulm, 3 May 1995	SSV Ulm 1846	SSV Reutlingen	4–1	1,000
1995–96	Kirchheim/Teck, 22 May 1996	SV Bonlanden	SpVgg Au/Iller	1–0	900
1996–97	Eislingen, 20 May 1997	SSV Ulm 1846	VfL Kirchheim/Teck	1–0	2,300
1997–98	Heidenheim, 20 May 1998	Sportfreunde Dorfmerkingen	SSV Ulm 1846 II	1–0	1,000
1998–99	Schorndorf, 6 June 1999	SSV Reutlingen	VfR Aalen	2–1 aet	800
1999–2000	Kirchheim/Teck, 25 June 2000	VfB Stuttgart II	SSV Ulm 1846 II	3–1	1,000
2000–01	Heidenheim, 30 May 2001	VfR Aalen	SSV Ulm 1846 II	2–0	1,400
2001–02	Eislingen, 14 May 2002	VfR Aalen	VfB Stuttgart II	2–0	1,400
2002–03	Sindelfingen, 27 May 2003	VfL Kirchheim/Teck	Stuttgarter Kickers	2–1	1,200
2003–04	Fellbach, 19 May 2004	VfR Aalen	FSV 08 Bissingen	8–0	1,000
2004–05	Eislingen, 25 May 2005	Stuttgarter Kickers	Heidenheimer SB	3–1	1,500
2005–06	Kirchheim/Teck, 24 May 2006	Stuttgarter Kickers	SSV Ulm 1846	7–6 after pen.	2,300
2006–07	Aalen, 29 May 2007	1. FC Normannia Gmünd	SSV Ulm 1846	2–1	1,300
2007–08	Ellwangen, 3 June 2008	1. FC Heidenheim	TSV Crailsheim	3–2	2,500
2008–09	Schwieberdingen, 2 June 2009	SG Sonnenhof Großaspach	SpVgg Ludwigsburg	1–0	1,500
2009–10	Ulm, 26 May 2010	VfR Aalen	FV Illertissen	4–1	2,200
2010–11	Kirchheim, 11 May 2011	1. FC Heidenheim	1. FC Normannia Gmünd	2–0	2,100
2011–12	Aalen, 9 May 2012	1. FC Heidenheim	SG Sonnenhof Großaspach	2–0	
2012–13	Aspach, 7 May 2013	1. FC Heidenheim	Neckarsulmer SU	3–1	
2013–14	Aspach, 7 May 2014	1. FC Heidenheim	Stuttgarter Kickers	4–2	2,500
2014–15	Stuttgart, 6 May 2015	SSV Reutlingen	FV Ravensburg	2–1	3,658
2015–16	Stuttgart, 28 May 2016	FV Ravensburg	FSV 08 Bissingen	5–2	3,600
2016–17	Stuttgart, 25 May 2017	Sportfreunde Dorfmerkingen	Stuttgarter Kickers	3–1	5,150
2017–18	Stuttgart, 21 May 2018	SSV Ulm	TSV Ilshofen	3–0	3,900
2018–19	Stuttgart, 25 May 2019	SSV Ulm	TSV Essingen	2–0	3,370
2019–20	Stuttgart, 22 August 2020	SSV Ulm	TSG Balingen	3–0	300
2020–21	Stuttgart, 29 May 2021	SSV Ulm	TSG Balingen	3–0	
2021–22	Stuttgart, 29 May 2021	Stuttgarter Kickers	SSV Ulm	5–4 after pen.	
2022–23	Stuttgart, 3 June 2023	TSG Balingen	Stuttgarter Kickers	6–5 after pen.	
2023–24	Aspach, 25 May 2024	VfR Aalen	Sonnenhof Großaspach	4–1	3,217
2024–25	Stuttgart, 24 May 2025	Sonnenhof Großaspach	TSG Balingen	2–0	2,850
2025–26	Stuttgart, 23 May 2026	Sonnenhof Großaspach	Stuttgarter Kickers	4–1	8,533

- Source: "Die Endspiele um den wfv-Pokal der Herren seit 1950/51" (in German). WFV. Archived from the original on 20 February 2008.
- Winners in **bold**.

== Winners ==
Listed in order of wins, the Cup winners are:

Club	Wins
SSV Ulm^{1}	11
VfR Aalen	8
1. FC Heidenheim^{2}	6
SSV Reutlingen	4
VfB Stuttgart II	4
Stuttgarter Kickers	3
SG Sonnenhof Großaspach	3
1. FC Normannia Gmünd	2
VfL Kirchheim/Teck	2
SC Geislingen	2
1. FC Eislingen	2
SpVgg Neckarsulm	2
SpVgg Lindau	2
Sportfreunde Dorfmerkingen	2
SV Bonlanden	1
TSF Ditzingen	1
TSG Backnang	1
TSG Giengen	1
FV Ebingen	1
TV Unterboihingen	1
SpVgg Freudenstadt	1
SpVgg Ludwigsburg	1
TV Gültstein	1
VfL Sindelfingen	1
TG Biberach	1
FV Illertissen	1
Germania Bietigheim	1
VfR Schwenningen	1
FC Urbach	1
Stuttgarter SC	1
FV 09 Nürtingen	1
ESC Ulm	1
FV Ravensburg	1
TSG Balingen	1

- ^{1} Includes one win by SSV Ulm.
- ^{2} Includes one win by VfL Heidenheim.
