= TSV Krähenwinkel/Kaltenweide =

- Full name: Turn- und Sportverein Krähenwinkel Kaltenweide e.V.
- Short name: TSV KK
- Founded: 1910
- Ground: Sportanlage Waldsee
- Chairman: Oliver Kussauer
- Head coach: Ralf Przyklen
- League: Landesliga Hannover
- 2020–21: Season annulled
- Website: https://www.tsv-kk.de/

TSV Krähenwinkel/Kaltenweide is a German association football club from Langenhagen, Lower Saxony.

== History ==
The club was founded in 1910. Its biggest success was the win of the Lower Saxony Cup in 1991 and the subsequent qualification for the 1991–92 DFB-Pokal, where they were eliminated in the second round against SSV Reutlingen after receiving a bye for the first round. Since 2015, the club plays in the sixth-tier Landesliga Hannover.

== Honours ==
The club's honours:

- Lower Saxony Cup
  - Champions: 1991
