= Ludmilla Kunzmann =

Czech businessperson (1774–1843)

Ludmilla Kunzmann (1774–1843) was a Czech businessperson.

Kunzmann was the daughter of Johann Jakob Gottschald (1731–1806) and in 1812 married the merchant Johann Joseph Kunzmann, with whom she had four children. When she was widowed in 1826, she inherited the business of her late spouse, including the Spitzenfabrik Anton Gottschald & Comp., a business company which played a major role in the industrialization of the Austrian Empire.
