= TSV Stelingen =

German sports club

- Full name: TSV Stelinger of 1926 eV
- Founded: 1926
- Ground: Stelinger Waldstadion
- League: Bezirksliga Hannover 2 (VII)
- 2015–16: 6th

TSV Stelingen is a German sports club based in the Stelingen district of Garbsen. The club's football division notably qualified for the 1986–87 DFB-Pokal, where they were eliminated by Arminia Bielefeld. They also won the 1986 Lower Saxony Cup. Volker Finke is the most notable figure associated with the club, which he both played for and managed during his career.

Currently the club participates in the tier seven Bezirksliga Hannover 2.

== Honours ==
The club's honours:

- Lower Saxony Cup
  - Winners: 1986
