= Marcel Kunstmann =

German footballer

Personal information
- Date of birth: 6 June 1988 (age 38)
- Place of birth: Ribnitz-Damgarten, East Germany
- Position: Forward

Team information
- Current team: TSV Krähenwinkel/Kaltenweide

Youth career
- –2010: PSV Ribnitz-Damgarten

Senior career*
| Years | Team | Apps | (Gls) |
| 2010–2012 | Hansa Rostock II | 52 | (11) |
| 2012–2013 | SC Verl | 35 | (16) |
| 2013–2014 | VfL Osnabrück | 1 | (0) |
| 2014 | Wormatia Worms | 12 | (1) |
| 2014–2015 | SC Verl | 11 | (0) |
| 2015–2016 | FC Schönberg 95 | 23 | (1) |
| 2016 | TSV Havelse | 13 | (2) |
| 2017– | TSV Krähenwinkel/Kaltenweide | 21 | (19) |
- * Club domestic league appearances and goals as of 18 October 2017

Marcel Kunstmann (born 6 June 1988) is a German footballer who currently plays for TSV Krähenwinkel/Kaltenweide.
