= Sportfreunde Ricklingen =

German football club

- Full name: Sportfreunde Ricklingen von 1906 e.V.
- Founded: 1906
- Ground: Beekestadion
- Capacity: 3,000
- Chairman: Dieter Maetz
- Manager: Alexander Repschläger
- League: Kreisliga Hannover (VIII)
- 2015–16: Bezirksliga Hannover 2 (VII), 16th (relegated)
Home colours	Away colours

The Sportfreunde Ricklingen is a German association football club from the Ricklingen suburb of Hanover, Lower Saxony.

The club's greatest success has been to earn promotion to the tier three Regionalliga Nord in 1996, where it played for three seasons. The club has also made two appearances in the first round of the DFB-Pokal, the German Cup.

== History ==
The club was formed in 1906 as the Freie Turner Ricklingen. The club was outlawed by the Nazis in 1933 but reformed in 1945, now under the current name Sportfreunde Ricklingen.

In 1958 the club won promotion to the highest football league in Lower Saxony, the tier two Amateur-Oberliga Niedersachsen and played at this level until 1964 when the league was reduced from two to one division. A period of three decades followed in which Ricklinge did not play at the highest level of Lower Saxony football.

The team's second rise began in 1993 with promotion to the tier four Verbandsliga Niedersachsen. It finished sixth in the league in 1993–94 which qualified it for the new Oberliga Niedersachsen/Bremen which was established when the Regionalligas were re-formed as the new third tier of the league system in 1994. Sportfreunde came fourth in the Oberliga in its first season there but won the league the season after and won promotion to the Regionalliga Nord. In this era the club also took part in the first round of the DFB-Pokal on two occasions, in 1992–93 and 1993–94, reaching the third round in its first appearance.

Sportfreunde played at Regionalliga level for three seasons, with an eleventh place in 1996–97 as its best result. The team's results declined after this and the club was relegated from the Regionalliga again in 1999. It was relegated from the Oberliga the season after when it came only sixteenth and found itself in the western division of the Verbandsliga Niedersachsen for 2000–01 where it finished one rank above a relegation spot. The following season it came only seventeenth in the Verbandsliga and was relegated from this league, too.

Sportfreunde Ricklingen has since fallen as far as the tier eight Kreisliga Hannover but success in the Kreisliga promotion round in 2014 took Sportfreunde back to the Bezirksliga where it lasted for two seasons before dropping back down again.

== Honours ==
The team's honours:

- Oberliga Niedersachsen/Bremen
  - Champions: 1996
- Landesliga Hannover
  - Champions: 2003
  - Runners-up: 2006
- Lower Saxony Cup
  - Winners: 1992, 1993

== Recent seasons ==
The recent season-by-season performance of the club:

Year	Division	Tier	Position
1994–95	Oberliga Niedersachsen/Bremen	IV	4th
1995–96	Oberliga Niedersachsen/Bremen	IV	1st↑
1996–97	Regionalliga Nord	III	11th
1997–98	Regionalliga Nord	III	13th
1998–99	Regionalliga Nord	III	18th↓
1999–2000	Oberliga Niedersachsen/Bremen	IV	16th↓
2000–01	Niedersachsenliga West	V	13th
2001–02	Niedersachsenliga West	V	17th↓
2002–03	Landesliga Hannover	VI	1st↑
2003–04	Niedersachsenliga West	V	17th↓
2004–05	Landesliga Hannover	VI	6th
2005–06	Landesliga Hannover	VI	2nd↑
2006–07	Niedersachsenliga West	V	14th↓
2007–08	Bezirksoberliga Hannover	VI	9th
2008–09	Bezirksoberliga Hannover	VI	4th
2009–10	Bezirksoberliga Hannover	VI	15th↓
2010–11	Bezirksliga Hannover 2	VII	15th↓
2011–12	Kreisliga Hannover	VIII	7th
2012–13	Kreisliga Hannover	VIII	5th
2013–14	Kreisliga Hannover	VIII	2nd↑
2014–15	Bezirksliga Hannover 2	VII	6th
2015–16	Bezirksliga Hannover 2	VII	16th↓
2016–17	Kreisliga Hannover	VIII	

- With the introduction of the Regionalligas in 1994 and the 3. Liga in 2008 as the new third tier, below the 2. Bundesliga, all leagues below dropped one tier. Between 2006 and 2010 the Landesliga Hannover was renamed Bezirksoberliga Hannover.

↑ Promoted	↓ Relegated
