= 1. FC Germania Egestorf/Langreder =

Sports club

- Full name: 1. Fußballclub Germania Egestorf/Langreder e.V
- Founded: 16 March 2001
- Ground: Sportanlage Egestorf
- Capacity: 3,000
- Chairman: Torsten Seebeck
- Head coach: Paul Nieber
- League: Oberliga Niedersachsen (V)
- 2025–26: Oberliga Niedersachsen, 2nd of 16
- Website: http://1fcgel.de/

1. FC Germania Egestorf/Langreder is a German association football club from the town of Barsinghausen, Lower Saxony. The club's greatest success has been promotion to the tier four Regionalliga Nord in 2016. By reaching the final of the 2015–16 Lower Saxony Cup the club also qualified for the German Cup for the first time, entering the first round of the 2016–17 edition.

== History ==
The club was formed on 16 March 2001 when two local clubs, TSV Egestorf and TSV Langreder, merged to form the current club in an effort to combine the extensive youth department of the former with the senior team of the latter.

The new club took started out in the tier seven Bezirksliga Hannover 1 but won promotion from this level to the Landesliga Hannover in 2003. It spent the next nine seasons there, with the league renamed to Bezirksoberliga Hannover from 2006 to 2010. After finishing runners-up in 2008 and 2010 and missing out on promotion Germania won the league in 2011–12 and earned promotion to the Niedersachsenliga for the first time. At this level the club finished sixth in its first season and gradually improving every year. A second-place finish in 2015–16 and success in the promotion round moved the club up to the tier four Regionalliga Nord for the first time. They were relegated in 2019.

The club qualified for the final of the Lower Saxony Cup and thereby directly for the first round of the 2016–17 DFB-Pokal. They lost 6–0 in the first round at home to Hoffenheim.

== Current squad ==
As of 12 February 2018

Note: Flags indicate national team as defined under FIFA eligibility rules; some limited exceptions apply. Players may hold more than one non-FIFA nationality.

No.	Pos.	Nation	Player
1	GK	GER	Markus Straten-Wolf
5	DF	GER	Jan Baßler
6	DF	GER	Jannik Oltrogge
7	MF	GER	Björn Lindemann
8	DF	GER	Marvin Stieler
9	FW	GHA	Michael Owusu
10	MF	GER	Sascha Derr
11	FW	GER	Dominik Behnsen
14	DF	GER	Marvin Schlömer
15	FW	GER	Christoph Beismann
16	FW	GER	Torben Engelking
17	DF	GER	Mirko Dismer

No.	Pos.	Nation	Player
18	DF	GER	Marek Waldschmidt
19	FW	GER	Sebastian Baar
20	MF	GER	Joshua Siegert
21	DF	GER	Marco Schikora
22	MF	GER	Theo Hellwig
23	DF	GER	Niklas Teichgräber
25	DF	GER	Yannick Oelmann
27	GK	GER	Sean Millard
28	GK	GER	Ole Schöttelndreier
29	MF	GER	Hendrik Weydandt
33	MF	GER	Kevin Schumacher
—	MF	GER	Lennart Novotny

== Honours ==
The club's honours:

- Landesliga Hannover
  - Champions: 2011–12
- Lower Saxony Cup
  - Runners-up: 2016

== Seasons ==
The season-by-season performance of the club:

Season	Division	Tier	Position
2001–02	Bezirksliga Hannover 1	VII	
2002–03	Bezirksliga Hannover 1	VII	2nd ↑
2003–04	Landesliga Hannover	VI	6th
2004–05	Landesliga Hannover	VI	5th
2005–06	Landesliga Hannover	VI	6th
2006–07	Bezirksoberliga Hannover	VI	6th
2007–08	Bezirksoberliga Hannover	VI	2nd
2008–09	Bezirksoberliga Hannover	VI	11th
2009–10	Bezirksoberliga Hannover	VI	2nd
2010–11	Landesliga Hannover	VI	4th
2011–12	Landesliga Hannover	VI	1st ↑
2012–13	Niedersachsenliga	V	6th
2013–14	Niedersachsenliga	V	5th
2014–15	Niedersachsenliga	V	4th
2015–16	Niedersachsenliga	V	2nd ↑
2016–17	Regionalliga Nord	IV	10th
2017–18	Regionalliga Nord	IV	5th

- The Landesliga Hannover was renamed to Bezirksoberliga Hannover from 2006 to 2010.

↑ Promoted	↓ Relegated
