= MSV Pampow =

Football club from Mecklenburg-Vorpommern, Germany

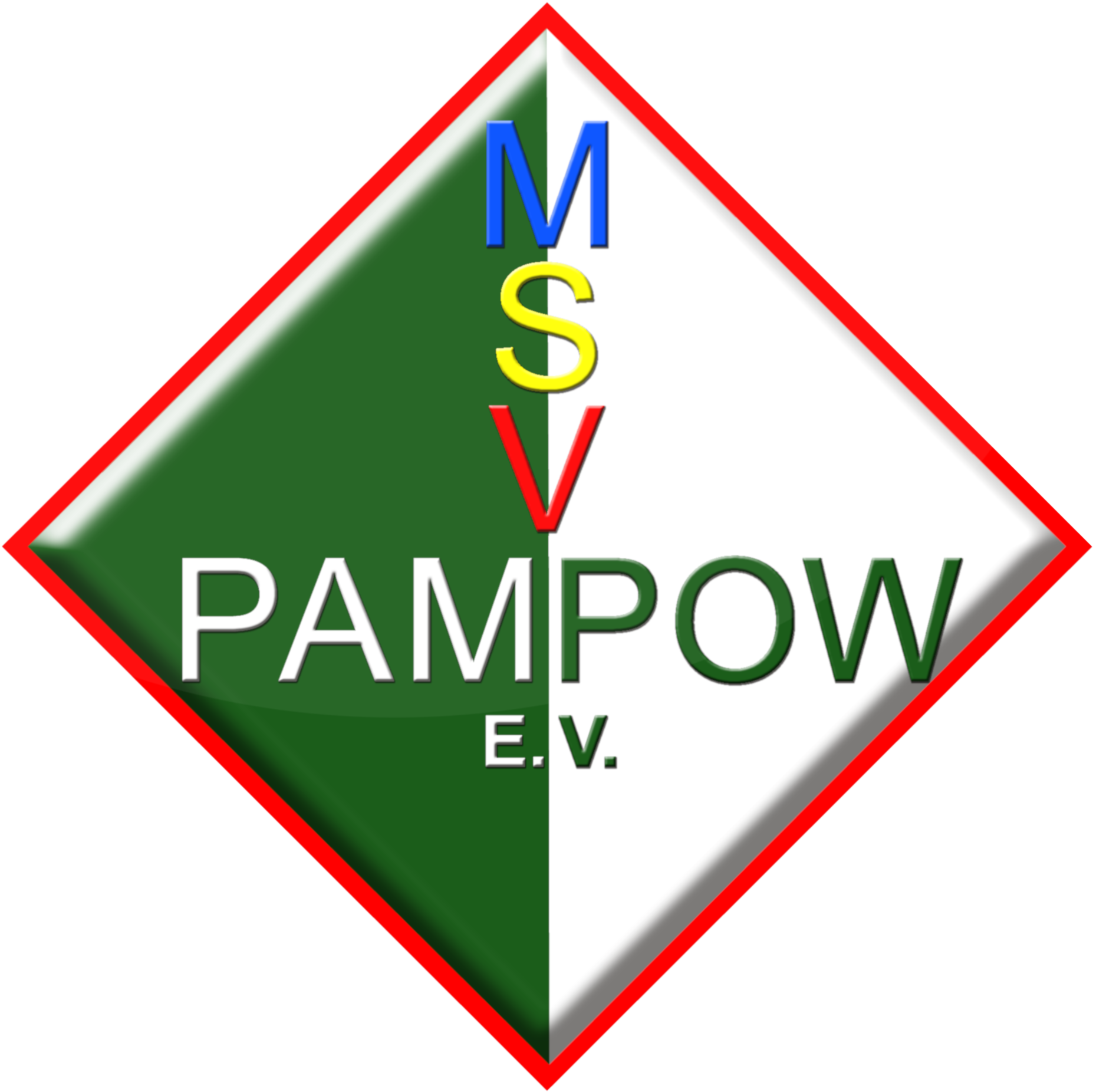
- Full name: Mecklenburgischer Sportverein Pampow e. V
- Founded: 1990
- Ground: Gartenwegarena, Pampow
- Coach: Ricardo Hagedorn
- League: NOFV-Oberliga Nord
- 2021-2022: NOFV-Oberliga Nord 11th of 19
- Website: https://msv-pampow.de/
Home colours	Away colours

MSV Pampow (German: Mecklenburgischer Sportverein Pampow e. V) is a German sports club in Mecklenburg-Vorpommern, Germany. The club was officially formed in 1990.

== History ==
The club's background dates back to the 1950s as BSG Traktor Pampow. BSG Traktor Pampow mostly competed in the 5th level of the DDR-Oberliga, which was the 1.Kreisklasse and sometimes had dropped down to the 6th level in the 2.Kreisklasse. MSV Pampow was officially formed on 22 June 1990, after German reunification. The club offers other sports such as volleyball, badminton and bowling. The team's nickname is "Piraten" or "Pirates".

On the football field, the team was promoted to the Verbandsliga Mecklenburg-Vorpommern in 2010 then came in 3rd and 4th in 2012 and 2014. The team reached the finals of the 2017 Mecklenburg-Vorpommern Cup, which was one of the biggest games they had ever played in, but were defeated by FC Hansa Rostock, 3–1. The team finished in 3rd place again in 2017 then won the Verbandsliga Mecklenburg-Vorpommern in 2018. Head Coach Ronny Stamer resigned in November 2022. Matthew Okoh became the head coach of Pampow in December 2022, but left after two weeks. This promoted them to the NOFV-Oberliga Nord, where they compete as of January 2023.

The team had a poor 2022–23 season, with concerns of being relegated. Ricardo Hagedorn became the new head coach of MSV Pampow in 2023, taking over from Tommy Bastian.

== Honors ==
- Verbandsliga Mecklenburg-Vorpommern

Champions: 2018

== In popular culture ==
MSV Pampow has been featured in the video game series, Football Manager.
