= Landesliga Hannover =

- Founded: 1979
- Country: Germany
- State: Lower Saxony
- Number of clubs: 17
- Level on pyramid: Level 6
- Promotion to: Oberliga Niedersachsen
- Relegation to: Bezirksliga Hannover 1-4
- Current champions: TSV Pattensen (2021–22)

The Landesliga Hannover, called the Bezirksoberliga Hannover from 1979 to 1994 and 2006 to 2010, is the sixth tier of the German football league system and the second highest league in the German state of Lower Saxony (German: Niedersachsen). It covers the region of the now defunct Regierungsbezirk Hanover.

It is one of four leagues at this level in Lower Saxony, the other three being the Landesliga Lüneburg, the Landesliga Weser-Ems and the Landesliga Braunschweig.

The term Landesliga can be translated as State league.

== Overview ==
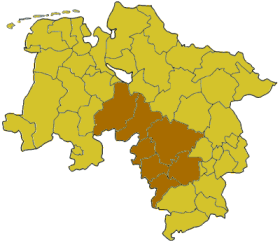
Map of Lower Saxony:Position of the Hanover region highlighted

The league's history goes back to 1979, when four new Bezirksoberligas (Braunschweig, Hannover, Lüneburg and Weser-Ems) were formed in the state of Lower Saxony. The Bezirksoberligas (6th tier) were set below the Verbandsliga Niedersachsen (4th tier) and the two Landesligas (5th tier) in the German football league system. In 1994, the two old Landesligas were dissolved, while the four Bezirksoberligas were renamed into Landesliga Braunschweig, Landesliga Hannover, Landesliga Lüneburg, and Landesliga Weser-Ems respectively. Due to the introduction of the new Regionalliga (IV) the new Landesligas still remained at the 6th tier of German football, however.

In 2006, the Landesliga was renamed into Bezirksoberliga again. The new Bezirksoberliga Hannover was made up of sixteen clubs, eleven from the Landesliga and five from the two Bezirksligas. A decider had to be played between the two third-placed teams in the Bezirksligas, which SV Nienstädt 09 won 2-0 over SG Diepholz. No club from the Verbandsliga Niedersachsen-West was relegated to the league that season, all three relegated sides went to Weser-Ems. The league was formed in a reorganisation of the league system in Lower Saxony, whereby the four regional Landsligas were replaced by the Bezirksoberligas. Below these, the number of Bezirksligas was increased. In Hanover, the two Bezirksligas were expanded to four, as in the other regions, except Weser-Ems, which was expanded to five.

The Bezirksoberliga, like the Landesliga before, was set in the league system below the Verbandsliga and above the now four Bezirksligas, which were numbered from one to four. The winner of the Bezirksoberliga was directly promoted to the Verbandsliga, while the bottom placed teams, in a varying number, were relegated to the Bezirksliga. The Bezirksoberligas of Weser-Ems and Hanover form the tier below the Verbandsliga West, while those of Lüneburg and Braunschweig form the tier below the eastern division of the Verbandsliga.

In the leagues first season, 2006–07, the runners-up of the league, TSV Stelingen, had to play-off with the runners-up of the Bezirksoberliga Weser-Ems, SV Holthausen-Biene, a game they won 1-0 and thereby gained promotion. In the following season, only the league champions were promoted while, in 2009, the SV Ramlingen-Ehlershausen moved up a level as runners-up.

At the end of the 2007-08 season, with the introduction of the 3. Liga, the Verbandsliga was renamed Oberliga Niedersachsen-West. For the Bezirksoberliga, this had no direct consequences.

After the 2009-10 season, the two Oberligas (English: Premier league) in Lower Saxony were merged to one single division. The four Bezirksoberliga champions that season were not automatically promoted, instead they had to compete with the four teams placed ninth and tenth in the Oberliga for four more spots in this league.

On 17 May 2010, the Lower Saxony football association decided to rename the four Bezirksoberligas to Landesligas from 1 July 2010. This change in name came alongside the merger of the two Oberliga divisions above it into the Oberliga Niedersachsen.

== Champions ==
=== Bezirksoberliga Hannover 1979–1994 ===
- 1980: Arminia Hannover Am.
- 1981: ASC Nienburg
- 1982: 1. FC Wunstorf
- 1983: TSV Burgdorf
- 1984: TSV Stelingen
- 1985: FC Lehrte
- 1986: SV 06 Lehrte
- 1987: OSV Hannover
- 1988: SC Harsum
- 1989: Sportfreunde Ricklingen
- 1990: SV 06 Lehrte
- 1991: Hannoverscher SC
- 1992: VfL Bückeburg
- 1993: SC Langenhagen
- 1994: FC Lehrte

=== Landesliga Hannover 1994–2006 ===
- 1995: Damla Genc Hannover
- 1996: Niedersachsen Döhren
- 1997: FC Stadthagen
- 1998: SV Ramlingen-Ehlershausen
- 1999: VfL Bückeburg
- 2000: 1. FC Wunstorf
- 2001: SV Linden 07
- 2002: Fortuna Sachsenross Hannover
- 2003: Sportfreunde Ricklingen
- 2004: SC Twistringen
- 2005: SV Bockenem
- 2006: SV Bavenstedt

=== Bezirksoberliga Hannover 2006–2010 ===
Season	Champions	Runners-up	Third
2006–07	**Heesseler SV**	**TSV Stelingen**	SC Twistringen
2007–08	**Preussen Hameln**	Germania Egestorf	TSV Burgdorf
2008–09	**VfL Bückeburg**	**SV Ramlingen-Ehlershausen**	TuS Kleefeld
2009–10	**Arminia Hannover**	Germania Egestorf	TSV Burgdorf

=== Landesliga Hannover 2010–present ===
Season	Champions	Runners-up	Third
2010–11	**VfL Bückeburg**	1. FC Wunstorf	TSV Burgdorf
2011–12	**Germania Egestorf**	TSV Burgdorf	SV Bavenstedt
2012–13	**1. FC Wunstorf**	TSV Burgdorf	Arminia Hannover
2013–14	**Arminia Hannover**	Heesseler SV	SV Bavenstedt
2014–15	**VfL Bückeburg**	SV Ramlingen-Ehlershausen	Heesseler SV
2015–16	**Hannoverscher SC**	SV Bavenstedt	TuS Sulingen
2016–17	**TuS Sulingen**	SV Bavenstedt	OSV Hannover
2017–18	**Hannoverscher SC**	Heesseler SV	SV Ramlingen-Ehlershausen
2018–19	**HSC Blau-Weiß Tündern**	SC Hemmingen-Westerfeld	SV Ramlingen-Ehlershausen
2019–20	**SV Ramlingen-Ehlershausen**	SV Bavenstedt	TSV Krähenwinkel/Kaltenweide
2020–21	Season curtailed and annulled by COVID-19 pandemic in Germany		
2021–22	**TSV Pattensen**	TSV Wetschen	TSV Krähenwinkel/Kaltenweide

- Promoted teams in **bold**.
