= SV Arminia Hannover =

German football club

- Full name: Sport-Verein Arminia Hannover e.V.
- Nickname: Die Blauen (The Blues)
- Founded: 1910
- Ground: Rudolf-Kalweit-Stadion
- Capacity: 16,000
- Chairman: Bernd Krajewski
- Manager: Murat Salar
- League: Niedersachsenliga (V)
- 2023–24: 14th
Home colours	Away colours

SV Arminia Hannover is a German association football club based in Hanover, Lower Saxony.

== History ==
Historical logo of SV Arminia Hannover

The club was founded in 1910 as FC Arminia Hannover and merged with Rugby-Verein Merkur in 1918, becoming SV Arminia-Merkur. Two years later they renamed themselves SV Arminia Hannover and captured the North German title. Through the 1920s and 1930s the club grew to include a number of other sports, but the football side did not earn any significant result, apart from the 1932–33 season when the club, under the English coach William Townley, advanced as far as the quarterfinals of the German Championship, where they were ousted by the eventual winners Fortuna Düsseldorf. During the Third Reich, the club played in the Gauliga Niedersachsen, later the Gauliga Südhannover-Braunschweig, generally as a top of the table side without winning another local championship.

For the most part, the club played second tier ball through the 1950s and 1960s with their best performances a pair of first-place finishes in the Regionalliga Nord in 1966 and 1967. An amateur championship in 1975 led Arminia to four seasons in the 2. Bundesliga Nord. They barely managed to hang on each year until finally slipping to the Amateur Oberliga Nord (III) in 1980. The side faded away over the next two decades, playing a roughly even number of seasons in tiers III and IV, until they were relegated from the now-defunct Oberliga Nord (IV) in 2007. In 2008–09 they played in the Niedersachsenliga (West, V) but were relegated again.

In June 2010, though, they managed to come back by winning the Bezirksoberliga (District Premier League) title and successfully competing in the relegation/promotion play-offs. So Arminia played in the new Niedersachsenliga (V) in 2010–11, where they were sent back after a 15th-place finish to the Landesliga Hannover (VI) for three seasons until they won the 2013–14 title to return to the Niedersachsenliga.

== Current squad ==
As of April 18, 2026

Note: Flags indicate national team as defined under FIFA eligibility rules; some limited exceptions apply. Players may hold more than one non-FIFA nationality.

No.	Pos.	Nation	Player
1	GK	GER	Dominik Grimpe
2	DF	GER	Emin Sassi
3	DF	CMR	Malik Mamadou Dieudonne
4	DF	GER	Moritz Alten
6	DF	TUN	Ahmed Belgacem
7	FW	JPN	Shin Akimoto
8	MF	LBN	Anis Nehme
9	MF	ETH	Aron Gebreslasie
10	MF	GER	Dag Rüdiger
11	MF	SYR	Delchad Jankir
13	FW	UKR	Rolan Kunytskyi
14	DF	GER	Araz Amo
15	DF	SYR	Abdullah Jankir

No.	Pos.	Nation	Player
16	MF	ARG	Jose Rodrigo Gasperini
17	FW	UKR	Anton Zholud
18	FW	LBR	Abdulmalik Abdul
19	MF	GER	Lukas-Nigel Nensel
20	DF	UKR	Vladyslav Pronko
21	DF	GER	Yannick Bahls
22	GK	GER	Ronald Maier
23	FW	GER	Björn Masur
24	FW	GER	Frank Munu
26	DF	GER	Justin Grete
27	MF	GER	David Sitzer
28	GK	GER	Finn Schönberner
30	MF	GER	Pa Salieu Njie

== Honours ==
The club's honours:

- Northern German champions
  - Champions: 1920
- Regionalliga Nord
  - Champions: 1967, 1968
- Landesliga Hannover
  - Champions: 2010, 2014

== Notable former players ==
The list includes players with at least one cap for their country's senior national team.

- (Bosnia and Herzegovina) Bruno Akrapović
- (Germany) Willi Fricke
- (Germany) Edmund Malecki
- (West Germany) Werner Olk
- (West Germany) Josef Posipal
- (Germany) Werner Schulz
- (West Germany) Lothar Ulsaß
- (Germany) Eduard Wolpers
- (West Germany) Klaus Wunder
