= Verbandspokal =

Men's regional football tournament in Germany

- Region: Germany
- Current champions: 21 regional winners
- Most championships: Werder Bremen II (20 titles)
- Broadcaster: ARD
- 2026–27 Verbandspokal

A Verbandspokal (English: "association cup") is a regional men's association football competition in Germany. There are 21 Verbandspokal competitions which function as qualifying tournaments for the following season's DFB-Pokal, the premier German Cup competition. Bundesliga and 2. Bundesliga clubs are not permitted to enter as they are already directly qualified for the first round of the DFB-Pokal.

While no Verbandspokal winner has ever gone on to win the German Cup, two have reached the final. Hertha BSC Amateure won the Berlin Cup in 1992 and went on to lose the 1993 DFB-Pokal final against Bayer Leverkusen, and Energie Cottbus won the 1996 Brandenburg Cup and went on to lose the 1997 DFB-Pokal final against VfB Stuttgart.

Apart from the 21 Verbandspokal champions, three more teams qualify from the regional football association, to bring the number of clubs in the first round of the DFB-Pokal to 64. These three teams come from the three regional associations with the most members, these currently being Bavaria, Lower Saxony and Westphalia.

The regional competitions, (plural:Verbandspokale) are generally open to all clubs in the 3. Liga and below, however regional rules vary between associations. 3. Liga clubs have a double chance to qualify for the first round of the DFB-Pokal, through the Verbandspokale and through finishing in the top four in their league.

The finals of the competitions can attract large numbers of spectators, like the 2014 Lower Rhine Cup between MSV Duisburg and TV Jahn Hiesfeld did, which was watched by 24,000 in Duisburg.

As of 2013–14, Werder Bremen II, reserve team of Werder Bremen, is the most successful team in any Verbandspokal competition, having won the Bremen Cup twenty times, followed by Tennis Borussia Berlin with sixteen Berlin Cup wins and Holstein Kiel with fifteen Schleswig-Holstein Cup wins.

== Rules and regulations ==
Rules and regulations for the Verbandspokale are set by the regional football associations and vary. Bavaria, the largest one, stipulates that reserve teams are not permitted to participate in the Bavarian Cup. Teams from lower divisions always have home advantage, if two teams of the same division are drawn against each other the team drawn first receives home advantage.

Bavarian clubs from the 3. Liga and Regionalliga Bayern, except reserve teams, are obliged to participate in the cup. Clubs from the two Bayernliga divisions and the five Landesliga Bayern divisions play a qualifying round. Additionally, the 24 regional cup winners in Bavaria, the Kreispokale, are also qualified for the first round of the Bavarian Cup. If a game is undecided after regular time a penalty shoot out follows, no extra time is played.

In Lower Saxony, the third-largest association, clubs from the state playing in the 3. Liga and Regionalliga Nord play in the 3. Liga / Regionalliga Lower Saxony Cup, whilst the clubs playing in Oberliga Niedersachsen as well as the four Bezirkspokal winners are qualified for the first round of the Amateur Lower Saxony Cup. The winners of both Cups are qualified for the national cup.

== History ==
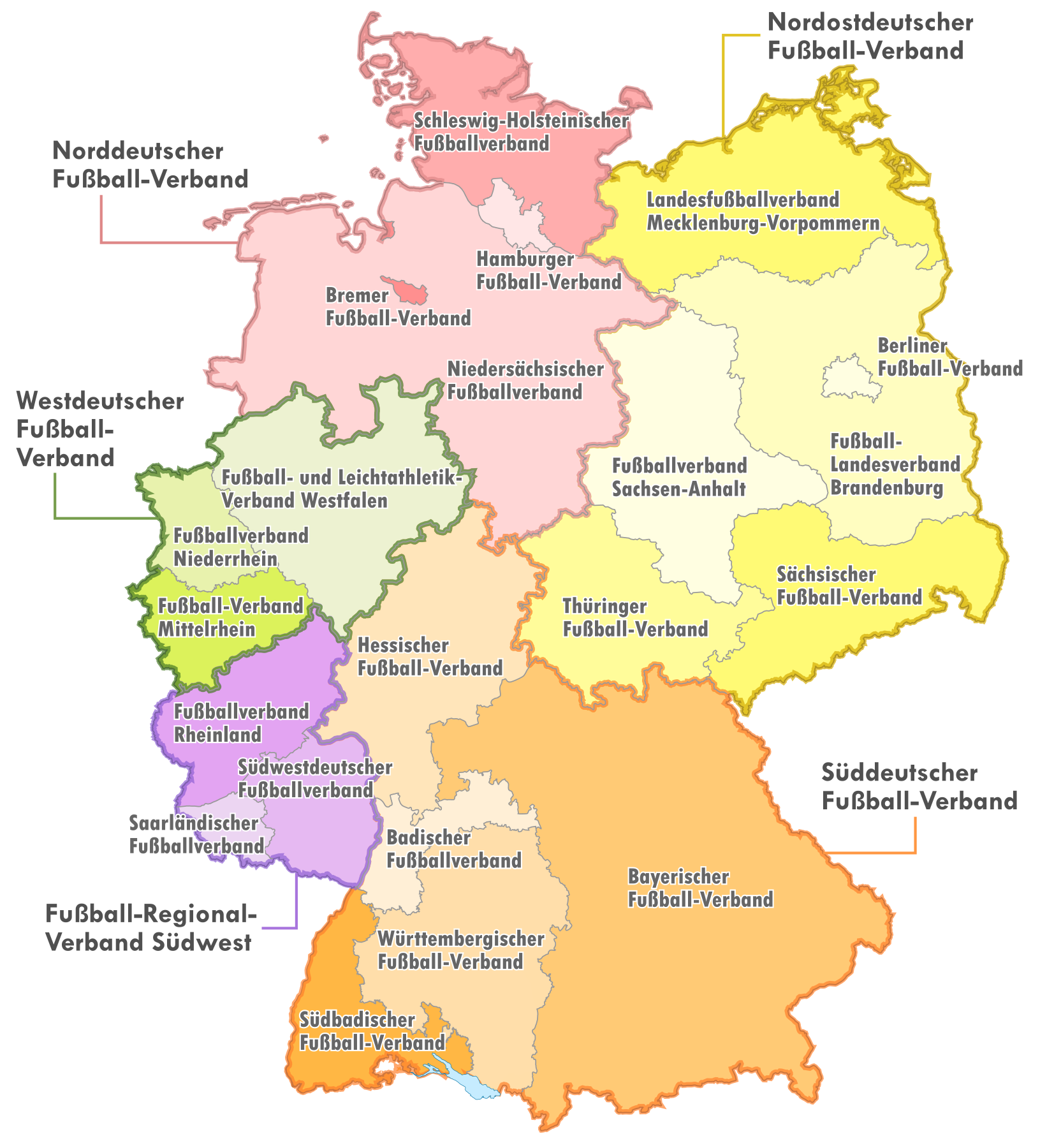
The areas of the regional football associations and their Verbandspokale.

The longest-running competition of the Verbandspokale is the Berlin Cup, first held in 1907. All other cup competitions originated after the Second World War.

In Southern Germany, the South Baden Cup was established in 1945, the Hesse Cup in 1946, the Bavarian Cup in 1947, with a long interruption from 1954 to 1998, the North Baden Cup in 1949, and the Württemberg Cup in 1950.

In Northern Germany, the Bremen Cup was established in 1950, the Schleswig-Holstein Cup from 1953, the Hamburg Cup was sporadically played from 1954 and permanently from 1981, and the Lower Saxony Cup from 1955. The Lower Saxony Cup was split between the 3. Liga / Regionalliga clubs and the lower division clubs starting 2018.

In the former East Germany, the Verbandspokale, in the form of the Brandenburg Cup, Mecklenburg-Vorpommern Cup, Saxony Cup, Saxony-Anhalt Cup, and Thuringia Cup, were established in 1990.

In Western Germany, the Lower Rhine Cup was established in 1980, the Westphalia Cup in 1981, and the Middle Rhine Cup in 1994.

In South Western Germany, the Rhineland Cup was established in 1953, the South West Cup in 1973, and the Saarland Cup in 1974.

== Current holders ==
The winners of the 2025–26 Verbandspokal competitions:

Cup	Winners
Baden Cup	Waldhof Mannheim
Bavarian Cup	Würzburger Kickers
Berlin Cup	VSG Altglienicke
Brandenburg Cup	VfB Krieschow
Bremen Cup	SV Hemelingen
Hamburg Cup	Hamburg-Eimsbütteler BC
Hessian Cup	Wehen Wiesbaden
Lower Rhine Cup	MSV Duisburg
Lower Saxony Cup	• SSV Jeddeloh • Lüneburger SK Hansa
Mecklenburg-Vorpommern Cup	Hansa Rostock
Middle Rhine Cup	Viktoria Köln
Rhineland Cup	Eintracht Trier
Saarland Cup	1. FC Saarbrücken
Saxony Cup	Erzgebirge Aue
Saxony-Anhalt Cup	Hallescher FC
Schleswig-Holstein Cup	Phönix Lübeck
South Baden Cup	Bahlinger SC
Southwestern Cup	Schott Mainz
Thuringian Cup	Carl Zeiss Jena
Westphalian Cup	SC Verl
Württemberg Cup	Sonnenhof Großaspach

== Broadcasting ==
In February 2016 it was announced that German broadcaster ARD for the first time would show all 21 Verbandspokal finals live in a conference as well as live stream them and that all finals would be played on the same date, 28 May 2016.
