= Lower Saxony Cup =

- Founded: 1956
- Region: Lower Saxony, Germany
- Qualifier for: DFB-Pokal
- Current champions: SSV Jeddeloh (2025–26)
- Most championships: VfL Osnabrück (5 titles)

The Lower Saxony Cup (German: Niedersächsischer Pokal) is an annual football cup competition, held by the Niedersächsischer Fußball-Verband (English: Lower Saxony Football Association) since 1956. For sponsorship reasons, the official name of the competition is Krombacher-Pokal. The Krombacher brewery, sponsor of the competition since 2010, also sponsored, at the time, the cup competitions in Thuringia, Westphalia, Hesse and Rhineland. It is one of the 21 regional cup competitions in Germany and a qualifying competition for the German Cup, with the winner and runners-up of the competition being automatically qualified for the first round of the German Cup in the following season.

The record winners of the competition are VfL Osnabrück with five titles, followed by Sportfreunde Salzgitter with four titles and Kickers Emden, VfL Wolfsburg, and Hannover 96 with three titles each to their name.

== Mode ==
The competition is open for all member clubs of the Lower Saxony FA playing in the 3. Liga, Regionalliga Nord and Niedersachsenliga. Additionally, the four regional cup winners in the state are also qualified. Reserve teams are not permitted to compete anymore. Regardless of which club has been drawn first, clubs from a lower league will always have home advantage when playing a club from a higher league. In case of a draw after regular time, no extra time is played and the game instead decided by a penalty shoot out. The two cup finalists automatically qualify for the first round of the German Cup.

== Winners ==
The winners of the competition:

Club	Wins	Years
VfL Osnabrück	5	2005, 2013, 2015, 2017, 2023
Sportfreunde Salzgitter^{1}	4	1957, 1961, 1964, 1975
Kickers Emden	3	1996, 2000, 2009
VfL Wolfsburg	3	1962, 2002^{‡}, 2003^{‡}
Hannover 96	3	1982^{‡}, 1997, 1998
SV Drochtersen/Assel	3	2016, 2018, 2019
SV Meppen	3	1999, 2021, 2024
Eintracht Braunschweig	2	2004, 2011
SV Wilhelmshaven	2	2007, 2010
Eintracht Nordhorn	2	1974, 2008
Sportfreunde Ricklingen	2	1992, 1993
TSV Verden	2	1987, 1988
VfV Hildesheim	2	1956, 1976
SC Göttingen 05	2	1963, 1967^{‡}
TSV Havelse	2	2012, 2020
BSV Schwarz-Weiß Rehden	2	2014, 2022
SSV Jeddeloh	1	2026
Blau-Weiß Lohne	1	2025
BV Cloppenburg	1	2006
SC Schüttorf	1	2001
SSV Vorsfelde	1	1995
Sportfreunde Oesede	1	1994

Club	Wins	Years
TSV Krähenwinkel/Kaltenweide	1	1991
TuS Bersenbrück	1	1990
VfL Bückeburg	1	1989
TSV Stelingen	1	1986
VfR Langelsheim	1	1985
TSV Friesen Hänigsen	1	1984
TuS Lingen	1	1983
TuS Celle	1	1981
Borussia Hannover	1	1980
MTV Gifhorn	1	1978
TuS Hessisch Oldendorf	1	1977
TSV Burgdorf	1	1973
FC Wolfsburg	1	1972
VfL Rütenbrock	1	1971
TuS Bodenteich	1	1970
SV Einbeck 05	1	1969
Roland Delmenhorst	1	1968
TuS Haste	1	1966
Wolfenbütteler SV	1	1965
Olympia Wilhelmshaven	1	1960
Preußen Hameln 07	1	1959
VfB Peine	1	1958

- ^{‡} Won by reserve team.
- ^{1} Known as Sportfreunde Lebenstedt before 1964.
- No competition held in 1979.
