= 2016–17 Regionalliga =

9th season of the Regionalliga

Regionalliga
- Season: 2016–17
- Champions: SV Meppen (Nord); FC Carl Zeiss Jena (Nordost); FC Viktoria Köln (West); SV Elversberg (Südwest); SpVgg Unterhaching (Bayern)
- Promoted: SV Meppen; FC Carl Zeiss Jena; SpVgg Unterhaching
- Relegated: Lupo Martini Wolfsburg; SV Eichede; FC Schönberg 95; Rot Weiss Ahlen; FC Schalke 04 II; TSG Sprockhövel; Sportfreunde Siegen; FK Pirmasens; FC 08 Homburg; 1. FC Kaiserslautern II; Teutonia Watzenborn-Steinberg; SV Eintracht Trier 05; FC Nöttingen; TSV 1860 Munich II; SpVgg Bayern Hof
- Withdrawn: RB Leipzig II

The 2016–17 Regionalliga was the ninth season of the Regionalliga, the fifth under the new format, as the fourth tier of the German football league system.

== Regionalliga Nord ==
18 teams from the states of Bremen, Hamburg, Lower Saxony and Schleswig-Holstein competed in the fifth season of the reformed Regionalliga Nord; 15 teams were retained from last season and 3 were promoted from the Oberliga, namely 2015–16 Niedersachsenliga champions Lupo Martini Wolfsburg and promotion round winners SV Eichede, 2015–16 Schleswig-Holstein-Liga champions, and 1. FC Germania Egestorf/Langreder, Niedersachsenliga runners-up. The season started on 31 July 2016.

| Pos | Team | Pld | W | D | L | GF | GA | GD | Pts | Qualification or relegation |
|---|---|---|---|---|---|---|---|---|---|---|
| 1 | SV Meppen (C, O, P) | 34 | 25 | 4 | 5 | 81 | 35 | +46 | 79 | Qualification to promotion play-offs |
| 2 | ETSV Weiche | 34 | 19 | 9 | 6 | 56 | 35 | +21 | 66 | |
| 3 | VfL Wolfsburg II | 34 | 15 | 10 | 9 | 53 | 40 | +13 | 55 | |
| 4 | VfB Lübeck | 34 | 16 | 7 | 11 | 49 | 38 | +11 | 55 | |
| 5 | Hamburger SV II | 34 | 15 | 7 | 12 | 57 | 52 | +5 | 52 | |
| 6 | TSV Havelse | 34 | 13 | 11 | 10 | 44 | 36 | +8 | 50 | |
| 7 | FC Eintracht Norderstedt 03 | 34 | 13 | 11 | 10 | 46 | 41 | +5 | 50 | |
| 8 | VfB Oldenburg | 34 | 13 | 8 | 13 | 50 | 43 | +7 | 47 | |
| 9 | SV Drochtersen/Assel | 34 | 12 | 10 | 12 | 44 | 33 | +11 | 46 | |
| 10 | 1. FC Germania Egestorf/Langreder | 34 | 13 | 7 | 14 | 47 | 49 | −2 | 46 | |
| 11 | Hannover 96 II | 34 | 11 | 10 | 13 | 43 | 47 | −4 | 43 | |
| 12 | Eintracht Braunschweig II | 34 | 12 | 7 | 15 | 41 | 51 | −10 | 43 | |
| 13 | Lüneburger SK Hansa | 34 | 11 | 9 | 14 | 30 | 35 | −5 | 42 | |
| 14 | FC St. Pauli II | 34 | 9 | 13 | 12 | 40 | 48 | −8 | 40 | |
| 15 | VfV 06 Hildesheim | 34 | 9 | 12 | 13 | 33 | 41 | −8 | 39 | |
| 16 | BSV Schwarz-Weiß Rehden | 34 | 8 | 11 | 15 | 31 | 58 | −27 | 35 | |
| 17 | Lupo Martini Wolfsburg (R) | 34 | 7 | 8 | 19 | 32 | 49 | −17 | 29 | Relegation to Oberliga |
| 18 | SV Eichede (R) | 34 | 6 | 4 | 24 | 29 | 75 | −46 | 22 | Relegation to Oberliga |

Source: kicker.de
Rules for classification: 1) Points; 2) Goal difference; 3) Goals scored
(C) Champions; (O) Play-off winners; (P) Promoted; (R) Relegated

=== Top goalscorers ===
As of 20 May 2017.

| Rank | Player | Club | Goals |
|---|---|---|---|
| 1 | (Germany) Benjamin Girth | SV Meppen | 20 |
| 2 | (Germany) Törles Tim Knöll | Hamburger SV II | 17 |
| 2 | (Germany) Marcel Reichwein | VfL Wolfsburg II | 17 |
| 4 | (Germany) Deniz Undav | TSV Havelse | 16 |
| 5 | (Germany) René Guder | ETSV Weiche | 15 |

== Regionalliga Nordost ==
18 teams from the states of Berlin, Brandenburg, Mecklenburg-Vorpommern, Saxony and Thuringia competed in the fifth season of the reformed Regionalliga Nordost; 15 teams were retained from the last season and 2 teams were promoted from the Oberliga. FC Energie Cottbus was relegated from the 2015–16 3. Liga. 1. FC Lokomotive Leipzig and FSV Union Fürstenwalde qualified by winning the NOFV-Oberliga Süd and the NOFV-Oberliga Nord respectively. The season started on 31 July 2016. The fixtures were published on 29 June 2016.

| Pos | Team | Pld | W | D | L | GF | GA | GD | Pts | Qualification or relegation |
|---|---|---|---|---|---|---|---|---|---|---|
| 1 | FC Carl Zeiss Jena (C, O, P) | 34 | 23 | 6 | 5 | 68 | 25 | +43 | 75 | Qualification to promotion play-offs |
| 2 | FC Energie Cottbus | 34 | 19 | 9 | 6 | 58 | 26 | +32 | 66 | |
| 3 | RB Leipzig II | 34 | 17 | 9 | 8 | 67 | 42 | +25 | 60 | Withdrawal (Note: RB Leipzig withdrew their second team after this season.) |
| 4 | FC Viktoria 1889 Berlin | 34 | 15 | 11 | 8 | 63 | 47 | +16 | 56 | |
| 5 | SV Babelsberg 03 | 34 | 16 | 7 | 11 | 55 | 42 | +13 | 55 | |
| 6 | Berliner AK 07 | 34 | 16 | 7 | 11 | 54 | 42 | +12 | 55 | |
| 7 | FSV Wacker 90 Nordhausen | 34 | 14 | 9 | 11 | 47 | 47 | 0 | 51 | |
| 8 | FC Oberlausitz Neugersdorf | 34 | 13 | 9 | 12 | 41 | 33 | +8 | 48 | |
| 9 | Hertha BSC II | 34 | 12 | 12 | 10 | 46 | 48 | −2 | 48 | |
| 10 | 1. FC Lokomotive Leipzig | 34 | 13 | 8 | 13 | 53 | 49 | +4 | 47 | |
| 11 | FC Schönberg 95 (R) | 34 | 13 | 8 | 13 | 53 | 60 | −7 | 47 | Relegation to Landesliga (Note: For financial reasons, FC Schönberg 95 entered the Landesliga for next season.) |
| 12 | VfB Auerbach | 34 | 11 | 12 | 11 | 47 | 50 | −3 | 45 | |
| 13 | FSV Union Fürstenwalde | 34 | 12 | 9 | 13 | 49 | 59 | −10 | 45 | |
| 14 | ZFC Meuselwitz | 34 | 11 | 11 | 12 | 37 | 36 | +1 | 44 | |
| 15 | BFC Dynamo | 34 | 12 | 8 | 14 | 51 | 54 | −3 | 44 | |
| 16 | FSV 63 Luckenwalde | 34 | 5 | 9 | 20 | 35 | 75 | −40 | 24 | |
| 17 | FSV Budissa Bautzen | 34 | 3 | 9 | 22 | 29 | 68 | −39 | 18 | |
| 18 | TSG Neustrelitz | 34 | 2 | 5 | 27 | 30 | 80 | −50 | 11 | |

Rules for classification: 1) Points; 2) Goal difference; 3) Goals scored
(C) Champions; (O) Play-off winners; (P) Promoted; (R) Relegated

=== Top goalscorers ===
As of 20 May 2017.

| Rank | Player | Club | Goals |
|---|---|---|---|
| 1 | (Germany) Federico Palacios Martínez | RB Leipzig II | 22 |
| 2 | (Germany) Andis Shala | SV Babelsberg 03 | 21 |
| 3 | (Germany) Dennis Srbeny | BFC Dynamo | 18 |
| 4 | (Ukraine) Myroslav Slavov | Berliner AK 07 | 16 |
| 5 | (Turkey) Ümit Ergirdi | FC Viktoria 1889 Berlin | 15 |

== Regionalliga West ==
18 teams from North Rhine-Westphalia competed in the fifth season of the reformed Regionalliga West; 14 teams were retained from the last season and 4 were promoted from the Oberliga. Wuppertaler SV was promoted from the 2015–16 Oberliga Niederrhein, Sportfreunde Siegen and TSG Sprockhövel from the 2015–16 Oberliga Westfalen and Bonner SC from the 2015–16 Oberliga Mittelrhein. The season started on 29 July 2016. The fixtures were published on 5 July 2016.

| Pos | Team | Pld | W | D | L | GF | GA | GD | Pts | Qualification or relegation |
|---|---|---|---|---|---|---|---|---|---|---|
| 1 | FC Viktoria Köln (C) | 34 | 23 | 3 | 8 | 91 | 42 | +49 | 72 | Qualification to promotion play-offs |
| 2 | Borussia Dortmund II | 34 | 16 | 15 | 3 | 54 | 25 | +29 | 63 | |
| 3 | Borussia Mönchengladbach II | 34 | 17 | 11 | 6 | 71 | 42 | +29 | 62 | |
| 4 | Rot-Weiß Oberhausen | 34 | 18 | 5 | 11 | 69 | 50 | +19 | 59 | |
| 5 | Rot-Weiss Essen | 34 | 14 | 13 | 7 | 48 | 35 | +13 | 55 | |
| 6 | 1. FC Köln II | 34 | 15 | 6 | 13 | 59 | 54 | +5 | 51 | |
| 7 | Alemannia Aachen | 34 | 16 | 11 | 7 | 51 | 39 | +12 | 50 (Note: Alemannia Aachen was given a 9-point penalty for insolvency.) | |
| 8 | SG Wattenscheid 09 | 34 | 14 | 8 | 12 | 51 | 44 | +7 | 50 | Qualification to DFB-Pokal play-off |
| 9 | Bonner SC | 34 | 14 | 6 | 14 | 60 | 61 | −1 | 48 | |
| 10 | SV Rödinghausen | 34 | 13 | 9 | 12 | 55 | 57 | −2 | 48 | |
| 11 | Wuppertaler SV | 34 | 10 | 12 | 12 | 47 | 47 | 0 | 42 | |
| 12 | Fortuna Düsseldorf II | 34 | 10 | 11 | 13 | 44 | 51 | −7 | 41 | |
| 13 | SC Verl | 34 | 9 | 13 | 12 | 37 | 49 | −12 | 40 | |
| 14 | SC Wiedenbrück | 34 | 9 | 12 | 13 | 43 | 52 | −9 | 39 | |
| 15 | Rot Weiss Ahlen (R) | 34 | 8 | 8 | 18 | 43 | 66 | −23 | 32 | Relegation to Oberliga |
| 16 | FC Schalke 04 II (R) | 34 | 8 | 6 | 20 | 32 | 48 | −16 | 30 | Relegation to Oberliga |
| 17 | TSG Sprockhövel (R) | 34 | 5 | 9 | 20 | 31 | 73 | −42 | 24 | Relegation to Oberliga |
| 18 | Sportfreunde Siegen (Note: Sportfreunde Siegen did not apply for a licence to play the 2017–18 season and was relegated.) (R) | 34 | 5 | 6 | 23 | 31 | 82 | −51 | 21 | Relegation to Oberliga |

Source: kicker.de
Rules for classification: 1) Points; 2) Goal difference; 3) Goals scored
(C) Champions; (R) Relegated

=== Westphalia DFB-Pokal play-off ===
As the Westphalian Football and Athletics Association is one of three regional associations with the most participating teams in their league competitions, they were allowed to enter a second team for the 2017–18 DFB-Pokal (in addition to the Westphalian Cup winners). A play-off took place between the best-placed eligible (non-reserve) Westphalian team of the Regionalliga West, SG Wattenscheid, and the best-placed eligible team of the Oberliga Westfalen, TuS Erndtebrück, with the winners qualifying for the DFB-Pokal.

5 June 2017
15:00 CEST

| SG Wattenscheid | 1–4 | TuS Erndtebrück |
|---|---|---|
| Keita-Ruel 34' | Report | Jaeschke 15', 62' (pen.); Tabaku 77'; Andrijanić 90+2' |

Lohrheidestadion, Bochum
Attendance: 2,773
Referee: Jörn Schäfer

=== Top goalscorers ===
As of 20 May 2017.

| Rank | Player | Club | Goals |
|---|---|---|---|
| 1 | (Germany) Mike Wunderlich | FC Viktoria Köln | 29 |
| 2 | (Germany) Lucas Musculus | Bonner SC | 20 |
| 2 | (Germany) Roman Prokoph | 1. FC Köln II | 20 |
| 4 | (Germany) Hamadi Al Ghaddioui | Borussia Dortmund II | 19 |
| 5 | (Germany) Simon Engelmann | Rot-Weiß Oberhausen | 14 |
| 5 | (Germany) Mike Feigenspan | Borussia Mönchengladbach II | 14 |
| 5 | (Turkey) Cihan Yılmaz | Rot Weiss Ahlen | 14 |

== Regionalliga Südwest ==
19 teams from Baden-Württemberg, Hesse, Rhineland-Palatinate and Saarland competed in the fourth season of the Regionalliga Südwest; 13 teams were retained from last season and 4 were promoted from the Oberliga. VfB Stuttgart II and Stuttgarter Kickers were relegated from the 2015–16 3. Liga. TuS Koblenz was promoted from the 2015–16 Oberliga Rheinland-Pfalz/Saar, Teutonia Watzenborn-Steinberg from the 2015–16 Hessenliga and SSV Ulm 1846 from the 2015–16 Oberliga Baden-Württemberg. The runners-up of the other Oberligas had a playoff round which was won by FC Nöttingen. The season started on 5 August 2016. The fixtures were published on 5 July 2016.

| Pos | Team | Pld | W | D | L | GF | GA | GD | Pts | Qualification or relegation |
|---|---|---|---|---|---|---|---|---|---|---|
| 1 | SV Elversberg (C) | 36 | 23 | 9 | 4 | 62 | 22 | +40 | 78 | Qualification to promotion play-offs |
| 2 | SV Waldhof Mannheim | 36 | 23 | 7 | 6 | 60 | 34 | +26 | 76 | Qualification to promotion play-offs |
| 3 | 1. FC Saarbrücken | 36 | 21 | 6 | 9 | 61 | 42 | +19 | 69 | |
| 4 | TSG 1899 Hoffenheim II | 36 | 16 | 9 | 11 | 69 | 40 | +29 | 57 | |
| 5 | TSV Steinbach | 36 | 16 | 8 | 12 | 52 | 39 | +13 | 56 | |
| 6 | Wormatia Worms | 36 | 13 | 13 | 10 | 44 | 37 | +7 | 52 | |
| 7 | VfB Stuttgart II | 36 | 15 | 7 | 14 | 58 | 55 | +3 | 52 | |
| 8 | TuS Koblenz | 36 | 15 | 7 | 14 | 40 | 39 | +1 | 52 | |
| 9 | SSV Ulm 1846 | 36 | 14 | 9 | 13 | 46 | 43 | +3 | 51 | |
| 10 | KSV Hessen Kassel | 36 | 13 | 10 | 13 | 41 | 49 | −8 | 49 | |
| 11 | FC Astoria Walldorf | 36 | 13 | 8 | 15 | 48 | 56 | −8 | 47 | |
| 12 | Kickers Offenbach | 36 | 14 | 11 | 11 | 49 | 39 | +10 | 44 (Note: Kickers Offenbach was given a 9-point penalty due to financial problems.) | |
| 13 | Stuttgarter Kickers | 36 | 11 | 11 | 14 | 53 | 51 | +2 | 44 | |
| 14 | FK Pirmasens (R) | 36 | 12 | 6 | 18 | 38 | 55 | −17 | 42 | Relegation to Oberliga |
| 15 | FC 08 Homburg (R) | 36 | 12 | 5 | 19 | 41 | 59 | −18 | 41 | Relegation to Oberliga |
| 16 | 1. FC Kaiserslautern II (R) | 36 | 9 | 9 | 18 | 46 | 59 | −13 | 36 | Relegation to Oberliga |
| 17 | Teutonia Watzenborn-Steinberg (R) | 36 | 10 | 5 | 21 | 42 | 68 | −26 | 35 | Relegation to Oberliga |
| 18 | SV Eintracht Trier 05 (R) | 36 | 9 | 6 | 21 | 44 | 58 | −14 | 33 | Relegation to Oberliga |
| 19 | FC Nöttingen (R) | 36 | 8 | 4 | 24 | 43 | 91 | −48 | 28 | Relegation to Oberliga |

Rules for classification: 1) Points; 2) Goal difference; 3) Goals scored
(C) Champions; (R) Relegated

=== Top goalscorers ===
As of 20 May 2017.

| Rank | Player | Club | Goals |
|---|---|---|---|
| 1 | (Germany) Muhamed Alawie | SV Eintracht Trier 05 | 22 |
| 1 | (Germany) Patrick Schmidt | 1. FC Saarbrücken | 22 |
| 3 | (Armenia) Sargis Adamyan | TSV Steinbach | 16 |
| 4 | (Albania) Edmond Kapllani | SV Elversberg | 15 |
| 5 | (Germany) Maximilian Oesterhelweg | SV Elversberg | 13 |

== Regionalliga Bayern ==
18 teams from Bavaria competed in the fifth season of the Regionalliga Bayern; 14 teams were retained from the last season and 4 were promoted from the Bayernliga. VfR Garching was promoted from the Bayernliga Süd and SV Seligenporten from the Bayernliga Nord. SpVgg Bayern Hof and TSV 1860 Rosenheim were also promoted as they beat SV Viktoria Aschaffenburg in the 2015–16 Bayernliga promotion playoff. The fixtures were published on 20 June 2016.

| Pos | Team | Pld | W | D | L | GF | GA | GD | Pts | Qualification or relegation |
|---|---|---|---|---|---|---|---|---|---|---|
| 1 | SpVgg Unterhaching (C, O, P) | 34 | 25 | 8 | 1 | 95 | 23 | +72 | 83 | Qualification to promotion play-offs and DFB-Pokal |
| 2 | FC Bayern Munich II | 34 | 15 | 13 | 6 | 62 | 40 | +22 | 58 | |
| 3 | FC Augsburg II | 34 | 15 | 12 | 7 | 71 | 36 | +35 | 57 | |
| 4 | FC Memmingen | 34 | 15 | 7 | 12 | 62 | 48 | +14 | 52 | |
| 5 | FV Illertissen | 34 | 15 | 6 | 13 | 46 | 46 | 0 | 51 | |
| 6 | 1. FC Nürnberg II | 34 | 14 | 7 | 13 | 72 | 67 | +5 | 49 | |
| 7 | FC Ingolstadt 04 II | 34 | 12 | 12 | 10 | 49 | 51 | −2 | 48 | |
| 8 | 1. FC Schweinfurt 05 | 34 | 14 | 6 | 14 | 57 | 61 | −4 | 48 | |
| 9 | TSV 1860 Rosenheim | 34 | 14 | 6 | 14 | 47 | 51 | −4 | 48 | |
| 10 | SV Wacker Burghausen | 34 | 13 | 8 | 13 | 46 | 54 | −8 | 47 | |
| 11 | VfR Garching | 34 | 13 | 7 | 14 | 56 | 64 | −8 | 46 | |
| 12 | SpVgg Bayreuth | 34 | 12 | 6 | 16 | 49 | 59 | −10 | 42 | |
| 13 | TSV Buchbach | 34 | 11 | 8 | 15 | 43 | 62 | −19 | 41 | |
| 14 | SV Schalding-Heining | 34 | 10 | 10 | 14 | 57 | 64 | −7 | 40 | |
| 15 | SpVgg Greuther Fürth II (O) | 34 | 7 | 10 | 17 | 39 | 58 | −19 | 31 | Qualification to relegation playoffs |
| 16 | SV Seligenporten (O) | 34 | 7 | 8 | 19 | 41 | 76 | −35 | 29 | Qualification to relegation playoffs |
| 17 | SpVgg Bayern Hof (R) | 34 | 3 | 3 | 28 | 35 | 87 | −52 | 12 | Relegation to Bayernliga |
| 18 | TSV 1860 Munich II (Note: 1860 Munich II was placed at the end of the table with 0 points and thereby relegated to the Bayernliga because the first team was relegated to the 2017–18 Regionalliga Bayern due to not obtaining a license for the 2017–18 3. Liga. Originally they had completed the season in second place with 63 points and 45:35 goals.) (R) | 34 | 18 | 9 | 7 | 0 | 0 | 0 | 0 | Relegation to Bayernliga |

Rules for classification: 1) Points; 2) Goal difference; 3) Goals scored
(C) Champions; (O) Play-off winners; (P) Promoted; (R) Relegated

=== Top goalscorers ===
As of 20 May 2017.

| Rank | Player | Club | Goals |
|---|---|---|---|
| 1 | (Germany) Stephan Hain | SpVgg Unterhaching | 32 |
| 2 | (Germany) Stefan Schimmer | FC Memmingen | 26 |
| 3 | (Germany) Marco Richter | FC Augsburg II | 24 |
| 4 | (Germany) Dominic Baumann | FC Ingolstadt 04 II | 19 |
| 4 | (Germany) Sascha Bigalke | SpVgg Unterhaching | 19 |
| 5 | (Republic of the Congo) Juvhel Tsoumou | Wacker Burghausen | 16 |

== Promotion play-offs ==
The draw for the 2016–17 promotion play-offs was held on 8 April, with another draw between the Regionalliga Südwest teams held on 5 May 2017.

=== Summary ===
The first legs were played on 28 May, and the second legs were played on 31 May and 1 June 2017.

| Team 1 | Agg. | Team 2 | 1st leg | 2nd leg |
|---|---|---|---|---|
| Viktoria Köln (W) | 3–3 (a) | Carl Zeiss Jena (NO) | 2–3 | 1–0 |
| SpVgg Unterhaching (B) | 5–2 | SV Elversberg (S1) | 3–0 | 2–2 |
| Waldhof Mannheim (S2) | 0–0 (3–4 p) | SV Meppen (N) | 0–0 | 0–0 (a.e.t.) |

=== Matches ===
All times Central European Summer Time (UTC+2)

28 May 2017
14:00

| Viktoria Köln | 2–3 | Carl Zeiss Jena |
|---|---|---|
| Wunderlich 72' (pen.); Lanius 87' | Report | Thiele 21', 67'; Sucsuz 28' |

Sportpark Höhenberg, Cologne
Attendance: 6,241
Referee: Martin Petersen
1 June 2017
17:00

| Carl Zeiss Jena | 0–1 | Viktoria Köln |
|---|---|---|
| | Report | Candan 81' |

Ernst-Abbe-Sportfeld, Jena
Attendance: 13,800
Referee: Robert Schröder

3–3 on aggregate. Carl Zeiss Jena won on away goals.

28 May 2017
14:00

| SpVgg Unterhaching | 3–0 | SV Elversberg |
|---|---|---|
| Müller 59'; Bigalke 64'; Steinherr 74' | Report |

Alpenbauer Sportpark, Unterhaching
Attendance: 8,000
Referee: René Rohde
31 May 2017
20:30

| SV Elversberg | 2–2 | SpVgg Unterhaching |
|---|---|---|
| Dobros 78'; Perstaller 90' | Report | Stahl 45+1'; Steinherr 76' |

Ursapharm-Arena an der Kaiserlinde, Spiesen-Elversberg
Attendance: 8,552
Referee: Lasse Koslowski

SpVgg Unterhaching won 5–2 on aggregate.

28 May 2017
14:30

| Waldhof Mannheim | 0–0 | SV Meppen |
|---|---|---|
| | Report |

Carl-Benz-Stadion, Mannheim
Attendance: 24,186
Referee: Guido Winkmann
31 May 2017
19:00

| SV Meppen | 0–0 (a.e.t.) | Waldhof Mannheim |
|---|---|---|
| | Report |
Penalties
| Kremer (penalty scored); Posipal (penalty scored); Vržogić (penalty missed); Vidović (penalty scored); Born (penalty scored) | 4–3 | (penalty scored) Korte; (penalty scored) Amin; (penalty missed) M. Seegert; (penalty scored) Tüting; (penalty missed) Gärtner |

Hänsch-Arena, Meppen
Attendance: 13,815
Referee: Benjamin Cortus

0–0 on aggregate. SV Meppen won 4–3 on penalties.
