= 2014–15 Bavarian Cup =

Tournament details
- Country: Germany
- Teams: 64

Final positions
- Champions: SpVgg Unterhaching
- Runners-up: SpVgg SV Weiden
- DFB-Pokal: 2015–16 DFB-Pokal

Tournament statistics
- Matches played: 63
- Top goal scorer: Adam Jabiri (Würzburger Kickers) (13 goals)

The 2014–15 Bavarian Cup (German: Bayerischer Toto-Pokal 2014–15) was the eighteenth edition of this competition, first held in 1998 and organised by the Bavarian Football Association (BFV). The winner qualified for the first round of the 2015–16 DFB-Pokal, the German Cup.

The competition was open to all senior men's football teams playing within the Bavarian football league system and the 3. Liga.

The final was played on 20 May in Weiden where Bayernliga club SpVgg SV Weiden lost to 3. Liga club SpVgg Unterhaching on penalties after a two-all draw after regular time. Unterhaching went on defeat Bundesliga club FC Ingolstadt 04 2–1 in the first round of the DFB-Pokal and advanced to the second round, where it defeated 2. Bundesliga club RB Leipzig before being knocked-out by Bayer Leverkusen in the third round.

== History ==
The Bavarian Cup, officially referred to as the Bayerischer Toto-Pokal for sponsorship reasons, was established in 1998. Until 2009 it was contested by only eight clubs, qualified through the seven annual regional cup competitions. Since 2009 the Bavarian Cup has been expanded to include 64 teams in the first round.

The defending champions are Würzburger Kickers who defeated SV Schalding-Heining in the 2013–14 final.

== Rules and regulations ==
The competition is open to all member clubs of the Bavarian Football Association except the clubs playing in the Bundesliga and 2. Bundesliga. Reserve teams are also barred from the competition. The Bavarian clubs from the 3. Liga and Regionalliga Bayern and the 24 District Cup (Kreispokale) winners qualified directly for the first round of the competition. The clubs from the two divisions of the Bayernliga and the five divisions of the Landesliga Bayern entered the qualifying stage of the competition. Clubs below the Landesliga had to take part in the Kreispokale to qualify. The 2014–15 edition will be the last one to feature three qualifying rounds played in the season before. From 2015–16 onwards only two qualifying rounds will be held, taking place just before the first round proper. Only the Bayernliga clubs and the best ten clubs from each Landesliga division will then take part in this.

For the 2014–15 edition this meant, with league membership in the 2013–14 season taken as reference, the three Bavarian 3. Liga clubs and the 13 Regionalliga Bayern clubs that were not reserve sides where automatically qualified. Additionally the 24 Kreispokal winners and 17 clubs qualified through the three rounds of qualifying entered the first round of the Bavarian Cup. The final seven clubs qualified to bring the number of teams up to 64 were the seven losing clubs from the 2013–14 competition from the third round and quarter finals that were not already qualified for the above reasons.

For the first two rounds of the Cup the draw was subdivided into five regional areas, for the third round in four regional areas. From the quarter-finals onwards no regional subdivision was applied anymore. Clubs from lower divisions were always awarded home advantage in the draw. Should both clubs in a match be of the same division the team drawn first received home advantage. If a game was drawn after regular time no extra time was played. Instead a penalty shoot out followed to determine the winner.

The winner of the 2014–15 Bavarian Cup will be automatically qualified for the first round of the German Cup the following season. The second spot awarded to the Bavarian Football Association for the first round of the German Cup will go to the best-placed non-reserve side in the Regionalliga Bayern. Should the same team win the cup and finished as the best non-reserve side in the Regionalliga or qualify automatically as one of the top four teams in the 3. Liga the second spot would have gone to the losing finalist. Should the losing finalist also have qualified already as one of the top four 3. Liga clubs a decider would be played between the two losing semi finalists.

== Schedule ==
The original dates set for the various rounds were:

- First round: 6 August 2014
- Second round: 20 August 2014
- Round of sixteen: 3 September 2014
- Quarter finals: 5 October 2014
- Semi finals: 22 April 2015
- Final: 13 May 2015

== Prize money ==
The BFV awards prize money to all clubs participating in the 2014–15 edition. Every club participating in the first round received €150, the winners of the first round €250. From there it gradually increased to the winner of the competition receiving €5,000.

The winner of the Bavarian Cup will also receive a starting fee from the DFB for participating in the first round of the DFB-Pokal. For the 2013–14 champion this was €140,000. Apart from this the club will also receive the gate receipts as all amateur clubs are guaranteed a home game for the first round.

== 2014–15 season ==
The games of the 2014–15 edition:

=== First round ===
The first round, played between 5 and 13 August 2014:

Home team	Away team	Score
TSV Ergoldsbach (8)(K)	SpVgg Landshut (5)	0–2
SV Motzing (8)(K)	SV Schalding-Heining (4)	0–1
SpVgg Erlangen (7)(K)	SpVgg Bayern Hof (5)	1–2
SpVgg Hainsacker (7)(K)	1. FC Bad Kötzting (5)	1–5
STV Deutenbach (8)(K)	FC Eintracht Bamberg (4)	1–11
1. FC Sonthofen (5)	VfB Eichstätt (5)	6–0
SV Alemannia Haibach (5)	Würzburger FV (5)	5–3 (pen)
FC/DJK Weißenburg (7)(K)	FC Memmingen (4)	2–4
SV Sportfreunde Dinkelsbühl (6)	Viktoria Aschaffenburg (5)	1–2
TSV Wertingen (7)(K)	FV Illertissen (4)	0–3
TV Wasserlos (8)(K)	SV Erlenbach (5)	2–4
SV Pullach (5)	TSV 1860 Rosenheim (5)	8–9 (pen)
1. FC Oberhaid (7)(K)	SV Friesen (6)	5–3
FC Sturm Hauzenberg (7)(K)	DJK Vilzing (5)	5–4 (pen)
FV Vilseck (6)(K)	SpVgg Bayreuth (4)	0–3
FC Pipinsried (5)	TSV Rain am Lech (5)	3–1
DJK SV Ost Memmingen (8)(K)	TSV Nördlingen (6)	1–3
DJK Oberschwarzach (7)(K)	1. FC Schweinfurt 05 (4)	1–2
Türkspor Augsburg (7)(K)	TSV Schwabmünchen (5)	2–1
FC Teutonia Reichenbach (8)(K)	TSV Großbardorf (5)	5–4 (pen)
SpVgg Jahn Forchheim (5)	SV Seligenporten (4)	3–4
FC SF Eitting (8)(K)	SV Wacker Burghausen (4)	4–6 (pen)
TSV Mönchröden (7)(K)	SpVgg Selbitz (6)	1–3
FC Bad Kohlgrub (7)(K)	BCF Wolfratshausen (5)	1–4
TSV Thiersheim (7)(K)	SpVgg SV Weiden (5)	0–6
TSV 1865 Dachau (5)	SV Heimstetten (4)	2–4
ASV Neumarkt (6)	SC Eltersdorf (5)	6–5 (pen)
FV Karlstadt (8)(K)	Würzburger Kickers (4)	0–10
SpVgg Haidhausen (8)(K)	FC Ismaning (6)	0–X ^{‡}
SV Haarbach (8)(K)	TSV Buchbach (4)	0–8
1. FC Schwarzenfeld (8)(K)	SSV Jahn Regensburg (3)	0–4
TSV Kastl (7)(K)	SpVgg Unterhaching (3)	0–4

- ^{‡} SpVgg Haidhausen fielded an ineligible player, game awarded to FC Ismaning.

=== Second round ===
The second round, played between 19 and 22 August 2014:

Home team	Away team	Score
1. FC Bad Kötzting (5)	TSV Buchbach (4)	1–2
FC Ismaning (6)	SV Wacker Burghausen (4)	0–2
FC Pipinsried (5)	FC Memmingen (4)	5–2
Türkspor Augsburg (7)	1. FC Sonthofen (5)	0–1
BCF Wolfratshausen (5)	SpVgg Unterhaching (3)	0–6
SpVgg SV Weiden (5)	SV Seligenporten (4)	1–0
TSV 1860 Rosenheim (5)	SV Heimstetten (4)	2–1
ASV Neumarkt (6)	SpVgg Bayern Hof (5)	1–0
SpVgg Selbitz (6)	SpVgg Bayreuth (4)	0–2
TSV Nördlingen (6)	FV Illertissen (4)	1–5
SpVgg Landshut (5)	SV Schalding-Heining (4)	1–2
FC Sturm Hauzenberg (7)	SSV Jahn Regensburg (3)	0–7
Viktoria Aschaffenburg (5)	SV Alemannia Haibach (5)	2–0
1. FC Oberhaid (7)	FC Eintracht Bamberg (4)	0–6
SV Erlenbach (5)	1. FC Schweinfurt 05 (4)	3–1
FC Teutonia Reichenbach (8)	Würzburger Kickers (4)	0–8

=== Round of sixteen ===
The round of sixteen, played between 2 and 10 September 2014:

Home team	Away team	Score
Viktoria Aschaffenburg (5)	FC Eintracht Bamberg (4)	0–1
SV Erlenbach (5)	Würzburger Kickers (4)	0–2
ASV Neumarkt (6)	SpVgg Bayreuth (4)	1–3
SV Schalding-Heining (4)	TSV Buchbach (4)	5–2
TSV 1860 Rosenheim (5)	SV Wacker Burghausen (4)	1–6
FC Pipinsried (5)	FV Illertissen (4)	0–3
1. FC Sonthofen (5)	SpVgg Unterhaching (3)	0–4
SpVgg SV Weiden (5)	SSV Jahn Regensburg (3)	1–0

=== Quarter finals ===
The quarter finals, played between 7 October 2014 and 8 April 2015:

Home team	Away team	Score
SpVgg SV Weiden (5)	FC Eintracht Bamberg (4)	6–4 (pen)
SV Wacker Burghausen (4)	Würzburger Kickers (4)	8–9 (pen)
SV Schalding-Heining (4)	SpVgg Bayreuth (4)	4–6 (pen)
FV Illertissen (4)	SpVgg Unterhaching (3)	6–7 (pen)

=== Semi finals ===
The semi finals, played on 22 April and 5 May 2015:

Home team	Away team	Score
SpVgg SV Weiden (5)	Würzburger Kickers (4)	3–0
SpVgg Bayreuth (4)	SpVgg Unterhaching (3)	1–3

=== Final ===
The final played on 20 May 2015 in Weiden:

Home team	Away team	Score
SpVgg SV Weiden (5)	SpVgg Unterhaching (3)	2–2 (5–6 pen)

=== Key ===
Symbol	League
(3)	3. Liga
(4)	Regionalliga Bayern
(5)	Bayernliga
(6)	Landesliga
(7)	Bezirksliga
(8)	Kreisliga
(K)	District Cup winner

== 2015–16 DFB-Pokal ==
The 2014–15 winner SpVgg Unterhaching qualified through the Bavarian Cup for the 2014–15 DFB-Pokal and drew the following opposition:

=== First round ===
9 August 2015	SpVgg Unterhaching	2–1	Ingolstadt 04	Unterhaching
16:00	Einsiedler 30', 48'	Report	Hartmann 83'	Stadium: Alpenbauer Sportpark; Attendance: 6,500; Referee: Patrick Ittrich (Hamburg)

=== Second round ===
27 October 2015	SpVgg Unterhaching	3–0	RB Leipzig	Unterhaching
20:30	Einsiedler 5'; Rosenzweig 23'; Steinherr 67'	Report		Stadium: Alpenbauer Sportpark; Attendance: 5,000; Referee: Robert Kampka (Mainz)

=== Third round ===
15 December 2015	SpVgg Unterhaching	1–3	Bayer Leverkusen	Unterhaching
19:00	Bauer 27'	Report	Chicharito 31'; Kießling 55'; Bellarabi 83'	Stadium: Alpenbauer Sportpark; Attendance: 12,500; Referee: Jochen Drees (Münster-Sarmsheim)
