= 2015–16 DFB-Pokal =

Tournament details
- Country: Germany
- Venue(s): Olympiastadion, Berlin
- Dates: 7 August 2015 – 21 May 2016
- Teams: 64

Final positions
- Champions: Bayern Munich (18th title)
- Runners-up: Borussia Dortmund
- Europa League: Mainz 05 (Note: Since both finalists of the DFB-Pokal qualified for the Champions League based on their league position, the Europa League group stage spot was awarded to the DFB-Pokal winner which was passed to the sixth-placed team in the Bundesliga, Mainz 05.)

Tournament statistics
- Matches played: 63
- Goals scored: 189 (3 per match)
- Attendance: 1,312,983 (20,841 per match)
- Top goal scorer(s): Henrikh Mkhitaryan (5 goals)
- Goals scored in penalty shoot-outs are not included.

The 2015–16 DFB-Pokal was the 73rd season of the annual German football cup competition. Sixty-four teams participated in the competition, including all teams from the previous year's Bundesliga and the 2. Bundesliga. It began on 7 August 2015 with the first of six rounds and ended on 21 May 2016 with the final at the Olympiastadion in Berlin, a nominally neutral venue, which has hosted the final since 1985. The DFB-Pokal is considered the second-most important club title in German football after the Bundesliga championship. The DFB-Pokal is run by the German Football Association (DFB).

The defending champions were Bundesliga side VfL Wolfsburg, after they beat Borussia Dortmund 3–1 in the previous final on 30 May 2015. They were knocked out of the competition in the second round by record title-holders Bayern Munich, losing 1–3. The Bavarians eventually progressed to the final where they defeated Borussia Dortmund 4–3 on penalties, as the match finished 0–0 after extra time, to win their eighteenth title, and third in four years.

The winner of the DFB-Pokal earned automatic qualification to the 2016–17 UEFA Europa League group stages. However, as Bayern Munich already qualified for the UEFA Champions League via their league position, Mainz 05, the sixth placed team in the 2015–16 Bundesliga took this Europa League place, and Mainz's Europa League third qualifying round spot went to Hertha BSC. As Bayern Munich won the Bundesliga and DFB-Pokal, completing a double, Borussia Dortmund, the runners-up of the Bundesliga will host the 2016 DFL-Supercup.

== Participating clubs ==
The following 64 teams qualified for the competition:

Bundesliga the 18 teams of the 2014–15 season	2. Bundesliga; the 18 teams of the 2014–15 season	3. Liga; the top 4 teams of the 2014–15 season
Bayern Munich; VfL Wolfsburg; Borussia Mönchengladbach; Bayer Leverkusen; FC Augsburg; Schalke 04; Borussia Dortmund; TSG Hoffenheim; Eintracht Frankfurt; Werder Bremen; Mainz 05; 1. FC Köln; Hannover 96; VfB Stuttgart; Hertha BSC; Hamburger SV; SC Freiburg; SC Paderborn	FC Ingolstadt; Darmstadt 98; Karlsruher SC; 1. FC Kaiserslautern; RB Leipzig; Eintracht Braunschweig; Union Berlin; 1. FC Heidenheim; 1. FC Nürnberg; Fortuna Düsseldorf; VfL Bochum; SV Sandhausen; FSV Frankfurt; Greuther Fürth; FC St. Pauli; 1860 Munich; Erzgebirge Aue; VfR Aalen	Arminia Bielefeld; MSV Duisburg; Holstein Kiel; Stuttgarter Kickers
Representatives of the regional associations 24 representatives of 21 regional associations of the DFB, qualified (in general) through the 2014–15 Verbandspokal (Note: The three regions with the most participating teams in their league competitions (Bavaria, Lower Saxony, and Westphalia) are allowed to enter two teams for the competition.)
Baden; FC Nöttingen: Bavaria (Note: In addition to the Bavarian Cup winners, the best amateur team of the 2014–15 Regionalliga Bayern also qualified.); SpVgg Unterhaching Würzburger Kickers: Berlin; BFC Dynamo: Brandenburg; Energie Cottbus: Bremen; Bremer SV: Hamburg; HSV Barmbek-Uhlenhorst: Hesse; Hessen Kassel	Lower Rhine; Rot-Weiss Essen: Lower Saxony (Note: Both finalists of the Lower Saxony Cup qualified.); VfL Osnabrück SV Meppen: Mecklenburg-Vorpommern; Hansa Rostock: Middle Rhine; Viktoria Köln: Rhineland; FSV Salmrohr: Saarland; SV Elversberg: Saxony; Chemnitzer FC	Saxony-Anhalt; Hallescher FC: Schleswig-Holstein (Note: VfB Lübeck qualified for the DFB-Pokal regardless of the outcome of the final of the Schleswig-Holstein Cup, as Holstein Kiel, the other finalists, already qualified for the DFB-Pokal through its 3. Liga place.); VfB Lübeck: South Baden; Bahlinger SC: Southwest; FK Pirmasens: Thuringia; Carl Zeiss Jena: Westphalia (Note: In addition to the Westphalian Cup winners, the best amateur team of the 2014–15 Oberliga Westfalen also qualified.); Sportfreunde Lotte TuS Erndtebrück: Württemberg; SSV Reutlingen

=== Map ===
Locations of the 2015–16 DFB-Pokal teams

Berlin teams	Bremen teams	Cologne teams	Frankfurt teams	Hamburg teams	Munich teams	Stuttgart teams
BFC Dynamo; Hertha BSC; Union Berlin	Bremer SV; Werder Bremen	1. FC Köln; Viktoria Köln	Eintracht Frankfurt; FSV Frankfurt	HSV Barmbek-Uhlenhorst; Hamburger SV; FC St. Pauli	Bayern Munich; 1860 Munich	VfB Stuttgart; Stuttgarter Kickers

== Format ==
=== Participation ===
The DFB-Pokal began with a round of 64 teams. The 36 teams of the Bundesliga and 2. Bundesliga, along with the top 4 finishers of the 3. Liga automatically qualified for the tournament. Of the remaining slots, 21 were given to the cup winners of the regional football associations, the Verbandspokal. The 3 remaining slots were given to the three regional associations with the most men's teams, which at the rime were Bavaria, Lower Saxony, and Westphalia. The runner-up of the cup for Lower Saxony was given the slot. The best amateur team of the Regionalliga Bayern and Oberliga Westfalen were given the slot for Bavaria and Westphalia, respectively. As every team was entitled to participate in local tournaments which qualified for the association cups, every team could in principle compete in the DFB-Pokal. Reserve teams were not permitted to enter. No two teams of the same association or corporation could participate in the DFB-Pokal.

=== Draw ===
The draws for the different rounds were conducted as following:

For the first round, the participating teams were split into two pots of 32 teams each. The first pot contained all teams which had qualified through their regional cup competitions, the best four teams of the 3. Liga, and the bottom four teams of the 2. Bundesliga. Every team from this pot was drawn to a team from the second pot, which contained all remaining professional teams (all the teams of the Bundesliga and the remaining fourteen 2. Bundesliga teams). The teams from the first pot were set as the home team in the process.

The two-pot scenario also applied for the second round, with the remaining 3. Liga and/or amateur team(s) in the first pot and the remaining Bundesliga and 2. Bundesliga teams in the other pot. Once again, the 3. Liga and/or amateur team(s) served as hosts. This time the pots did not have to be of equal size though, depending on the results of the first round. Theoretically, it was even possible that there could be only one pot, if all of the teams from one of the pots from the first round beat all the others in the second pot. Once one pot was empty, the remaining pairings were drawn from the other pot with the first-drawn team for a match serving as hosts.

For the remaining rounds other than the final, the draw was conducted from just one pot. Any remaining 3. Liga and/or amateur team(s) were the home team if drawn against a professional team. In every other case, the first-drawn team served as hosts.

=== Match rules ===
Teams met in one game per round. A match took place for 90 minutes, with two halves of 45 minutes. If still tied after regulation, 30 minutes of extra time were played, consisting of two periods of 15 minutes. If the score was still level after this, the match was decided by a penalty shoot-out. A coin toss decided who took the first penalty.

=== Cards ===
If a player received five yellow cards, even throughout multiple seasons, he was then banned from the next cup match. If a player received a second yellow card, they were banned from the next cup match. If a player received a red card, they were banned a minimum of one match, but more could be added by the German Football Association.

=== Champion qualification ===
The winner of the DFB-Pokal earns automatic qualification for the group stage of next year's edition of the UEFA Europa League. As winners Bayern Munich had already qualified for the UEFA Champions League by winning the Bundesliga, the spot went to the team in sixth, Mainz 05, and the league's second qualifying round spot went to the team in seventh, Hertha BSC. As Bayern won both the Bundesliga and the DFB-Pokal, completing a double, the runner-up of the Bundesliga, Borussia Dortmund, hosted the 2016 DFL-Supercup at the start of the next season.

== Schedule ==
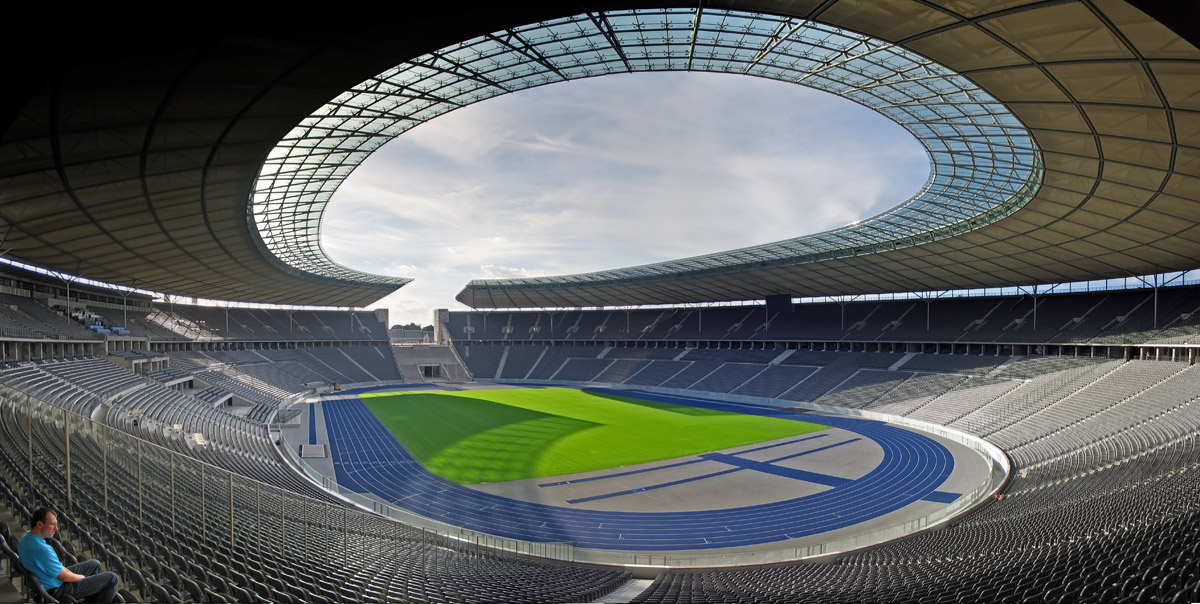
The Olympiastadion in Berlin hosted the final.

The rounds of the 2015–16 competition were scheduled as follows:

Round	Draw date and time	Matches
First round	10 June 2015, 23:00 CEST	7–10 August 2015
Second round	14 August 2015, 22:50 CEST	27–28 October 2015
Round of 16	1 November 2015, 20:00 CET	15–16 December 2015
Quarter-finals	16 December 2015, 23:15 CET	9–10 February 2016
Semi-finals	10 February 2016, 23:00 CET	19–20 April 2016
Final	10 February 2016, 23:00 CET	21 May 2016 at Olympiastadion, Berlin

== Matches ==
A total of sixty-three matches took place, starting with the first round on 7 August 2015 and culminating with the final on 21 May 2016 at the Olympiastadion in Berlin.

=== First round ===
The draw for the first round was held on 10 June 2015. Former national team player Karlheinz Förster led the draw, with tennis player Andrea Petkovic drawing from the pots.

The thirty-two matches took place from 7 to 10 August 2015.

As usual, a small number of lower-division teams had to play their home matches at different locations than their usual home grounds. This includes TuS Erndtebrück, who had to play in the Leimbachstadion in Siegen, Bremer SV, who had to switch to the Sportpark am Vinnenweg in Bremen, and FC Nöttingen, who had to play in the Wildparkstadion in Karlsruhe.

All times are CEST (UTC+2).

7 August 2015	TuS Erndtebrück	0–5	Darmstadt 98	Siegen (Note: The match was moved to the Leimbachstadion in Siegen for additional seating.)
19:00		Report	Sailer 9'; Stroh-Engel 10', 67'; Heller 57'; Rausch 84'	Stadium: Leimbachstadion; Attendance: 7,857; Referee: Florian Heft (Neuenkirchen)

7 August 2015	BFC Dynamo	0–2	FSV Frankfurt	Berlin
19:00		Report	Kapllani 3' (pen.); Dedić 42'	Stadium: Friedrich-Ludwig-Jahn-Sportpark; Attendance: 6,198; Referee: Matthias Jöllenbeck (Freiburg im Breisgau)

7 August 2015	SV Elversberg	1–3 (a.e.t.)	FC Augsburg	Spiesen-Elversberg
20:00	Maek 52'	Report	Bobadilla 83'; Mölders 101'; Werner 109'	Stadium: Ursapharm-Arena an der Kaiserlinde; Attendance: 5,434; Referee: Sören Storks (Velen)

8 August 2015	Viktoria Köln	2–1	Union Berlin	Cologne
15:30	Wunderlich 68'; Reimerink 74'	Report	Quaner 41'	Stadium: Sportpark Höhenberg; Attendance: 4,540; Referee: Timo Gerach (Landau)

8 August 2015	SV Meppen	0–4	1. FC Köln	Meppen
15:30		Report	Modeste 1', 26' (pen.), 78'; Zoller 87'	Stadium: Hänsch-Arena; Attendance: 13,815; Referee: Christian Dietz (Munich)

8 August 2015	Hallescher FC	0–1	Eintracht Braunschweig	Halle (Saale)
15:30		Report	Zuck 67'	Stadium: ERDGAS Sportpark; Attendance: 9,549; Referee: Benjamin Cortus (Röthenbach an der Pegnitz)

8 August 2015	Stuttgarter Kickers	1–4	VfL Wolfsburg	Stuttgart
15:30	Badiane 79'	Report	Kruse 4'; Dost 45'; De Bruyne 47'; Bendtner 86'	Stadium: GAZİ-Stadion auf der Waldau; Attendance: 9,760; Referee: Sascha Stegemann (Niederkassel)

8 August 2015	Sportfreunde Lotte	0–3	Bayer Leverkusen	Lotte
15:30		Report	Kießling 15'; Çalhanoğlu 55' (pen.); Bender 77' (pen.)	Stadium: Sportpark am Lotter Kreuz; Attendance: 5,450; Referee: Martin Thomsen (Kleve)

8 August 2015	MSV Duisburg	0–5	Schalke 04	Duisburg
15:30		Report	Huntelaar 3'; Nastasić 39'; Geis 45'; Di Santo 63'; Goretzka 85'	Stadium: Schauinsland-Reisen-Arena; Attendance: 30,600; Referee: Wolfgang Stark (Ergolding)

8 August 2015	Würzburger Kickers	0–2 (a.e.t.)	Werder Bremen	Würzburg
15:30		Report	Ujah 102'; Bartels 108'	Stadium: flyeralarm Arena; Attendance: 9,706; Referee: René Rohde (Rostock)

8 August 2015	Erzgebirge Aue	1–0	Greuther Fürth	Aue
15:30	Skarlatidis 67'	Report		Stadium: Sparkassen-Erzgebirgsstadion; Attendance: 6,000; Referee: Robert Schröder (Hanover)

8 August 2015	Bremer SV	0–3	Eintracht Frankfurt	Bremen (Note: The match was moved to the Sportpark am Vinnenweg in Bremen for additional seating.)
15:30		Report	Castaignos 31'; Aigner 51'; Waldschmidt 71'	Stadium: Sportpark am Vinnenweg; Attendance: 3,400; Referee: Thorsten Schriever (Dorum)

8 August 2015	1860 Munich	2–0	TSG Hoffenheim	Munich
18:00	Claasen 51'; Mulić 90+3'	Report		Stadium: Allianz Arena; Attendance: 17,800; Referee: Harm Osmers (Hanover)

8 August 2015	SSV Reutlingen	3–1	Karlsruher SC	Reutlingen
20:30	Ricciardi 14' (pen.), 33' (pen.), 90+1' (pen.)	Report	Kempe 63'	Stadium: Stadion an der Kreuzeiche; Attendance: 8,166; Referee: Robert Kempter (Stockach)

8 August 2015	Holstein Kiel	1–2	VfB Stuttgart	Kiel
20:30	Czichos 37'	Report	Didavi 41'; Ginczek 60'	Stadium: Holstein-Stadion; Attendance: 9,916; Referee: Guido Winkmann (Kerken)

9 August 2015	Carl Zeiss Jena	3–2 (a.e.t.)	Hamburger SV	Jena
14:30	Gerlach 15'; Jovanović 58'; Pieles 106'	Report	Olić 48'; Gregoritsch 90+3'	Stadium: Ernst-Abbe-Sportfeld; Attendance: 13,800; Referee: Frank Willenborg (Osnabrück)

9 August 2015	Bahlinger SC	0–0 (a.e.t.) (3–5 p)	SV Sandhausen	Bahlingen
14:30		Report		Stadium: Kaiserstuhlstadion; Attendance: 3,890; Referee: Florian Badstübner (Windsbach)
	Penalties
	Bührer (penalty scored); Nopper (penalty scored); Adam (penalty scored); Göppert (penalty missed)		(penalty scored) Bouhaddouz; (penalty scored) Paqarada; (penalty scored) Linsmayer; (penalty scored) Kister; (penalty scored) Wooten

9 August 2015	HSV Barmbek-Uhlenhorst	0–5	SC Freiburg	Hamburg
14:30		Report	Petersen 2', 45+1', 61', 63'; Schuster 71'	Stadium: Wilhelm-Rupprecht-Platz; Attendance: 4,607; Referee: Steffen Mix (Abtswind)

9 August 2015	FSV Salmrohr	0–5	VfL Bochum	Salmtal
14:30		Report	Terodde 40', 49', 59'; Terrazzino 64', 90'	Stadium: Salmtalstadion; Attendance: 4,500; Referee: Patrick Schult (Hamburg)

9 August 2015	Chemnitzer FC	0–2	Borussia Dortmund	Chemnitz
14:30		Report	Aubameyang 25'; Mkhitaryan 82'	Stadium: Stadion an der Gellertstraße; Attendance: 12,500; Referee: Peter Sippel (Munich)

9 August 2015	VfB Lübeck	1–2	SC Paderborn	Lübeck
16:00	Richter 43'	Report	Knechtel 54' (o.g.); Sağlık 59' (pen.)	Stadium: Stadion an der Lohmühle; Attendance: 7,558; Referee: Arne Aarnink (Nordhorn)

9 August 2015	Rot-Weiss Essen	0–0 (a.e.t.) (1–3 p)	Fortuna Düsseldorf	Essen
16:00		Report		Stadium: Stadion Essen; Attendance: 17,500; Referee: Daniel Siebert (Berlin)
	Penalties
	Baier (penalty missed); Weber (penalty missed); Cekić (penalty missed); Fritz (penalty scored)		(penalty missed) Ya Konan; (penalty scored) Haggui; (penalty missed) Van Duinen; (penalty scored) Strohdiek; (penalty scored) Liendl

9 August 2015	FK Pirmasens	1–4	1. FC Heidenheim	Pirmasens
16:00	Schmieden 82'	Report	Halloran 28'; Morabit 32'; Leipertz 51', 80'	Stadium: Sportpark Husterhöhe; Attendance: 2,320; Referee: Thorben Siewer (Drolshagen)

9 August 2015	SpVgg Unterhaching	2–1	FC Ingolstadt	Unterhaching
16:00	Einsiedler 30', 48'	Report	Hartmann 83'	Stadium: Alpenbauer Sportpark; Attendance: 6,500; Referee: Patrick Ittrich (Hamburg)

9 August 2015	FC Nöttingen	1–3	Bayern Munich	Karlsruhe (Note: The match was moved to the Wildparkstadion in Karlsruhe for additional seating.)
16:00	Hecht-Zirpel 16'	Report	Vidal 5' (pen.); Götze 17'; Lewandowski 26'	Stadium: Wildparkstadion; Attendance: 29,484; Referee: Robert Kampka (Mainz)

9 August 2015	Hansa Rostock	0–0 (a.e.t.) (4–5 p)	1. FC Kaiserslautern	Rostock
18:30		Report		Stadium: Ostseestadion; Attendance: 20,100; Referee: Sven Jablonski (Bremen)
	Penalties
	Jänicke (penalty scored); Ahlschwede (penalty scored); Ziemer (penalty missed); Bickel (penalty scored); Ikeng (penalty scored)		(penalty scored) Löwe; (penalty scored) Halfar; (penalty scored) Przybyłko; (penalty scored) Vučur; (penalty scored) Karl

9 August 2015	Hessen Kassel	0–2	Hannover 96	Kassel
18:30		Report	Sané 15'; Karaman 90+2'	Stadium: Auestadion; Attendance: 18,482; Referee: Patrick Alt (Heusweiler)

9 August 2015	Energie Cottbus	0–3	Mainz 05	Cottbus
20:30		Report	Frei 30'; Jairo 33'; Clemens 62'	Stadium: Stadion der Freundschaft; Attendance: 11,123; Referee: Robert Hartmann (Wangen im Allgäu)

10 August 2015	Arminia Bielefeld	0–2	Hertha BSC	Bielefeld
18:30		Report	Kalou 73'; Darida 88'	Stadium: SchücoArena; Attendance: 21,484; Referee: Benjamin Brand (Bamberg)

10 August 2015	VfL Osnabrück	0–2; Awarded (Note: The match was stopped in the 71st minute, with VfL Osnabrück leading 1–0, after the referee was hit by a lighter, and the match was abandoned soon thereafter. The sports court of the DFB, in accordance with section 18, paragraph 4 of the Laws and Rules of Procedure of the DFB, awarded a 0–2 win to RB Leipzig.)	RB Leipzig	Osnabrück
18:30		Report		Stadium: osnatel-ARENA; Attendance: 10,000; Referee: Martin Petersen (Stuttgart)

10 August 2015	VfR Aalen	0–0 (a.e.t.) (1–2 p)	1. FC Nürnberg	Aalen
18:30		Report		Stadium: SCHOLZ ARENA; Attendance: 9,172; Referee: Bibiana Steinhaus (Langenhagen)
	Penalties
	Drexler (penalty missed); Schwabl (penalty missed); Klauß (penalty scored); Kienle (penalty missed); Menig (penalty missed)		(penalty missed) Behrens; (penalty missed) Brečko; (penalty scored) Schöpf; (penalty missed) Hovland; (penalty scored) Kutschke

10 August 2015	FC St. Pauli	1–4	Borussia Mönchengladbach	Hamburg
20:30	Rzatkowski 33'	Report	Stindl 54', 67'; Traoré 56'; Hazard 86'	Stadium: Millerntor-Stadion; Attendance: 28,175; Referee: Florian Meyer (Burgdorf)

=== Second round ===
The draw for the second round was held on 14 August 2015. Then DFB president Wolfgang Niersbach led the draw, with skier Felix Neureuther drawing from the pots.

The sixteen matches took place on 27 and 28 October 2015. The lowest ranked team left in the competition was SSV Reutlingen from the fifth tier of German football.

All times are CET (UTC+1).

27 October 2015	Erzgebirge Aue	1–0	Eintracht Frankfurt	Aue
19:00	Wegner 75'	Report		Stadium: Sparkassen-Erzgebirgsstadion; Attendance: 10,175; Referee: Robert Hartmann (Wangen im Allgäu)

27 October 2015	FSV Frankfurt	1–2 (a.e.t.)	Hertha BSC	Frankfurt
19:00	Golley 47'	Report	Kalou 56', 99' (pen.)	Stadium: Frankfurter Volksbank Stadion; Attendance: 8,177; Referee: Patrick Ittrich (Hamburg)

27 October 2015	Mainz 05	1–2	1860 Munich	Mainz
19:00	Schindler 6' (o.g.)	Report	Mugoša 70'; Okotie 77'	Stadium: Coface Arena; Attendance: 17,017; Referee: Harm Osmers (Hanover)

27 October 2015	1. FC Nürnberg	5–1	Fortuna Düsseldorf	Nuremberg
19:00	Burgstaller 10'; Behrens 17'; Füllkrug 41'; Leibold 43'; Blum 69'	Report	Demirbay 72'	Stadium: Grundig Stadion; Attendance: 19,235; Referee: Marco Fritz (Korb)

27 October 2015	SpVgg Unterhaching	3–0	RB Leipzig	Unterhaching
20:30	Einsiedler 5'; Rosenzweig 23'; Steinherr 67'	Report		Stadium: Alpenbauer Sportpark; Attendance: 5,000; Referee: Robert Kampka (Mainz)

27 October 2015	Darmstadt 98	2–1	Hannover 96	Darmstadt
20:30	Sulu 74'; Wagner 79'	Report	Sobiech 75'	Stadium: Merck-Stadion am Böllenfalltor; Attendance: 15,900; Referee: Daniel Siebert (Berlin)

27 October 2015	VfL Bochum	1–0	1. FC Kaiserslautern	Bochum
20:30	Löwe 67' (o.g.)	Report		Stadium: rewirpowerSTADION; Attendance: 18,514; Referee: Günter Perl (Pullach)

27 October 2015	VfL Wolfsburg	1–3	Bayern Munich	Wolfsburg
20:30	Schürrle 90'	Report	Douglas Costa 15'; Müller 20', 34'	Stadium: Volkswagen Arena; Attendance: 30,000; Referee: Knut Kircher (Rottenburg am Neckar)

28 October 2015	Viktoria Köln	0–6	Bayer Leverkusen	Cologne
19:00		Report	Brandt 15'; Bellarabi 35'; Hernández 38', 55'; Kießling 80'; Yurchenko 83'	Stadium: Sportpark Höhenberg; Attendance: 6,177; Referee: Benjamin Cortus (Röthenbach an der Pegnitz)

28 October 2015	SV Sandhausen	0–0 (a.e.t.) (3–4 p)	1. FC Heidenheim	Sandhausen
19:00		Report		Stadium: Hardtwaldstadion; Attendance: 2,693; Referee: Wolfgang Stark (Ergolding)
	Penalties
	Bouhaddouz (penalty missed); Paqarada (penalty missed); Roßbach (penalty scored); Stolz (penalty scored); Linsmayer (penalty scored)		(penalty scored) Kraus; (penalty scored) Schnatterer; (penalty scored) Theuerkauf; (penalty missed) Titsch-Rivero; (penalty scored) Feick

28 October 2015	Borussia Dortmund	7–1	SC Paderborn	Dortmund
19:00	Ramos 25'; Castro 30', 58'; Kagawa 43'; Gündoğan 54' (pen.); Piszczek 87'; Mkhitaryan 89'	Report	Lakić 21'	Stadium: Signal Iduna Park; Attendance: 74,605; Referee: Peter Sippel (Munich)

28 October 2015	SC Freiburg	0–3	FC Augsburg	Freiburg im Breisgau
19:00		Report	Ji 12'; Esswein 25'; Caiuby 50'	Stadium: Schwarzwald-Stadion; Attendance: 19,600; Referee: Christian Dingert (Lebecksmühle)

28 October 2015	Carl Zeiss Jena	0–2	VfB Stuttgart	Jena
20:30		Report	Harnik 21'; Maxim 90+2' (pen.)	Stadium: Ernst-Abbe-Sportfeld; Attendance: 18,000; Referee: Florian Meyer (Burgdorf)

28 October 2015	SSV Reutlingen	0–4	Eintracht Braunschweig	Reutlingen
20:30		Report	Holtmann 21', 61'; Berggreen 36'; Ademi 79'	Stadium: Stadion an der Kreuzeiche; Attendance: 7,524; Referee: René Rohde (Rostock)

28 October 2015	Schalke 04	0–2	Borussia Mönchengladbach	Gelsenkirchen
20:30		Report	Stindl 42'; Hazard 53' (pen.)	Stadium: Veltins-Arena; Attendance: 60,655; Referee: Tobias Stieler (Hamburg)

28 October 2015	Werder Bremen	1–0	1. FC Köln	Bremen
20:30	Ujah 23'	Report		Stadium: Weserstadion; Attendance: 40,856; Referee: Felix Brych (Munich)

=== Round of 16 ===
The draw for the round of 16 was held on 1 November 2015. DFB general secretary Helmut Sandrock led the draw, with musician Vanessa Mai drawing from the pot.

The eight matches took place on 15 and 16 December 2015. The lowest ranked team left in the competition was SpVgg Unterhaching from the fourth tier of German football.

All times are CET (UTC+1).

15 December 2015	SpVgg Unterhaching	1–3	Bayer Leverkusen	Unterhaching
19:15 (Note: The match was delayed 15 minutes.)	Bauer 27'	Report	Hernández 31'; Kießling 55'; Bellarabi 83'	Stadium: Alpenbauer Sportpark; Attendance: 12,500; Referee: Jochen Drees (Münster-Sarmsheim)

15 December 2015	Borussia Mönchengladbach	3–4	Werder Bremen	Mönchengladbach
19:15	Stindl 32'; Hrgota 74', 90+4'	Report	Sternberg 52'; Vestergaard 58'; Pizarro 75'; Ujah 78'	Stadium: Stadion im Borussia-Park; Attendance: 53,106; Referee: Günter Perl (Pullach)

15 December 2015	Erzgebirge Aue	0–2	1. FC Heidenheim	Aue
20:30		Report	Feick 48'; Schnatterer 54'	Stadium: Sparkassen-Erzgebirgsstadion; Attendance: 8,250; Referee: Guido Winkmann (Kerken)

15 December 2015	Bayern Munich	1–0	Darmstadt 98	Munich
20:30	Alonso 40'	Report		Stadium: Allianz Arena; Attendance: 72,500; Referee: Daniel Siebert (Berlin)

16 December 2015	1. FC Nürnberg	0–2	Hertha BSC	Nuremberg
19:00		Report	Darida 32'; Brooks 65'	Stadium: Grundig Stadion; Attendance: 35,204; Referee: Tobias Stieler (Hamburg)

16 December 2015	VfB Stuttgart	3–2 (a.e.t.)	Eintracht Braunschweig	Stuttgart
19:00	Niedermeier 21'; Werner 99'; Šunjić 118'	Report	Baffo 6'; Ademi 110'	Stadium: Mercedes-Benz Arena; Attendance: 21,950; Referee: Peter Sippel (Munich)

16 December 2015	FC Augsburg	0–2	Borussia Dortmund	Augsburg
20:30		Report	Aubameyang 61'; Mkhitaryan 66'	Stadium: WWK ARENA; Attendance: 30,101; Referee: Manuel Gräfe (Berlin)

16 December 2015	1860 Munich	0–2	VfL Bochum	Munich
20:30		Report	Haberer 39'; Hoogland 44'	Stadium: Allianz Arena; Attendance: 19,800; Referee: Marco Fritz (Korb)

=== Quarter-finals ===
The draw for the quarter-finals was held on 16 December 2015. DFB general secretary Helmut Sandrock led the draw, with handballer Carsten Lichtlein drawing from the pot.

The four matches took place on 9 and 10 February 2016. The lowest ranked teams left in the competition were VfL Bochum and 1. FC Heidenheim from the second tier of German football.

All times are CET (UTC+1).

9 February 2016	Bayer Leverkusen	1–3	Werder Bremen	Leverkusen
19:00	Hernández 22' (pen.)	Report	S. García 31'; Pizarro 42' (pen.); Grillitsch 82'	Stadium: BayArena; Attendance: 24,104; Referee: Wolfgang Stark (Ergolding)

9 February 2016	VfB Stuttgart	1–3	Borussia Dortmund	Stuttgart
20:30	Rupp 21'	Report	Reus 5'; Aubameyang 31'; Mkhitaryan 89'	Stadium: Mercedes-Benz Arena; Attendance: 46,500; Referee: Tobias Stieler (Hamburg)

10 February 2016	1. FC Heidenheim	2–3	Hertha BSC	Heidenheim an der Brenz
19:00	Feick 10'; Schnatterer 82' (pen.)	Report	Ibišević 14', 21'; Haraguchi 58'	Stadium: Voith-Arena; Attendance: 11,900; Referee: Deniz Aytekin (Oberasbach)

10 February 2016	VfL Bochum	0–3	Bayern Munich	Bochum
20:30		Report	Lewandowski 39', 90'; Thiago 61'	Stadium: rewirpowerSTADION; Attendance: 28,000; Referee: Bastian Dankert (Rostock)

=== Semi-finals ===
The draw for the semi-finals was held on 10 February 2016. DFB vice-president Peter Frymuth led the draw, with handballer Andreas Wolff drawing from the pot.

The two matches took place on 19 and 20 April 2016. All remaining teams left in the competition were from the first tier of German football.

All times are CEST (UTC+2).

19 April 2016
20:30

Bayern Munich	2–0	Werder Bremen
Müller 30', 71' (pen.)	Report

Allianz Arena, Munich
Attendance: 75,000
Referee: Tobias Stieler (Hamburg)

20 April 2016
20:30

Hertha BSC	0–3	Borussia Dortmund
	Report	Castro 21'; Reus 75'; Mkhitaryan 83'

Olympiastadion, Berlin
Attendance: 76,233
Referee: Deniz Aytekin (Oberasbach)

=== Final ===
The final took place on 21 May 2016 at the Olympiastadion in Berlin.

21 May 2016
20:00 CEST

Bayern Munich	0–0 (a.e.t.)	Borussia Dortmund
	Report
Penalties
Vidal (penalty scored); Lewandowski (penalty scored); Kimmich (penalty missed); Müller (penalty scored); Douglas Costa (penalty scored)	4–3	(penalty scored) Kagawa; (penalty missed) Bender; (penalty missed) Papastathopoulos; (penalty scored) Aubameyang; (penalty scored) Reus

Olympiastadion, Berlin
Attendance: 74,322
Referee: Marco Fritz (Korb)

== Bracket ==
The following is the bracket which the DFB-Pokal resembled. Numbers in parentheses next to the match score represent the results of a penalty shoot-out.

First round 7–10 August 2015
Energie Cottbus	0
Mainz 05	3
1860 Munich	2
TSG Hoffenheim	0
FSV Salmrohr	0
VfL Bochum	5
Hansa Rostock	0 (4)
1. FC Kaiserslautern (p)	0 (5)
Stuttgarter Kickers	1
VfL Wolfsburg	4
FC Nöttingen	1
Bayern Munich	3
TuS Erndtebrück	0
Darmstadt 98	5
Hessen Kassel	0
Hannover 96	2
SpVgg Unterhaching	2
FC Ingolstadt	1
VfL Osnabrück	0
RB Leipzig	2
Viktoria Köln	2
Union Berlin	1
Sportfreunde Lotte	0
Bayer Leverkusen	3
MSV Duisburg	0
Schalke 04	5
FC St. Pauli	1
Borussia Mönchengladbach	4
Würzburger Kickers	0
Werder Bremen (a.e.t.)	2
SV Meppen	0
1. FC Köln	4
Erzgebirge Aue	1
Greuther Fürth	0
Bremer SV	0
Eintracht Frankfurt	3
Bahlinger SC	0 (3)
SV Sandhausen (p)	0 (5)
FK Pirmasens	1
1. FC Heidenheim	4
VfR Aalen	0 (1)
1. FC Nürnberg (p)	0 (2)
Rot-Weiss Essen	0 (1)
Fortuna Düsseldorf (p)	0 (3)
BFC Dynamo	0
FSV Frankfurt	2
Arminia Bielefeld	0
Hertha BSC	2
Carl Zeiss Jena (a.e.t.)	3
Hamburger SV	2
Holstein Kiel	1
VfB Stuttgart	2
SSV Reutlingen	3
Karlsruher SC	1
Hallescher FC	0
Eintracht Braunschweig	1
HSV Barmbek-Uhlenhorst	0
SC Freiburg	5
SV Elversberg	1
FC Augsburg (a.e.t.)	3
Chemnitzer FC	0
Borussia Dortmund	2
VfB Lübeck	1
SC Paderborn	2

Second round 27–28 October 2015
Mainz 05	1
1860 Munich	2
VfL Bochum	1
1. FC Kaiserslautern	0
VfL Wolfsburg	1
Bayern Munich	3
Darmstadt 98	2
Hannover 96	1
SpVgg Unterhaching	3
RB Leipzig	0
Viktoria Köln	0
Bayer Leverkusen	6
Schalke 04	0
Borussia Mönchengladbach	2
Werder Bremen	1
1. FC Köln	0
Erzgebirge Aue	1
Eintracht Frankfurt	0
SV Sandhausen	0 (3)
1. FC Heidenheim (p)	0 (4)
1. FC Nürnberg	5
Fortuna Düsseldorf	1
FSV Frankfurt	1
Hertha BSC (a.e.t.)	2
Carl Zeiss Jena	0
VfB Stuttgart	2
SSV Reutlingen	0
Eintracht Braunschweig	4
SC Freiburg	0
FC Augsburg	3
Borussia Dortmund	7
SC Paderborn	1

Round of 16; 15–16 December 2015
1860 Munich	0
VfL Bochum	2
Bayern Munich	1
Darmstadt 98	0
SpVgg Unterhaching	1
Bayer Leverkusen	3
Borussia Mönchengladbach	3
Werder Bremen	4
Erzgebirge Aue	0
1. FC Heidenheim	2
1. FC Nürnberg	0
Hertha BSC	2
VfB Stuttgart (a.e.t.)	3
Eintracht Braunschweig	2
FC Augsburg	0
Borussia Dortmund	2

Quarter-finals; 9–10 February 2016
VfL Bochum	0
Bayern Munich	3
Bayer Leverkusen	1
Werder Bremen	3
1. FC Heidenheim	2
Hertha BSC	3
VfB Stuttgart	1
Borussia Dortmund	3

Semi-finals; 19–20 April 2016
Bayern Munich	2
Werder Bremen	0
Hertha BSC	0
Borussia Dortmund	3

Final; 21 May 2016
Bayern Munich (p)	0 (4)
Borussia Dortmund	0 (3)

== Top goalscorers ==
The following are the top scorers of the DFB-Pokal, sorted first by number of goals, and then alphabetically if necessary. Goals scored in penalty shoot-outs are not included.

Rank	Player	Team	Goals
1	(Armenia) Henrikh Mkhitaryan	Borussia Dortmund	5
2	(Mexico) Javier Hernández	Bayer Leverkusen	4
2	(Germany) Thomas Müller	Bayern Munich	4
2	(Germany) Nils Petersen	SC Freiburg	4
2	(Germany) Lars Stindl	Borussia Mönchengladbach	4
6	(Gabon) Pierre-Emerick Aubameyang	Borussia Dortmund	3
6	(Germany) Gonzalo Castro	Borussia Dortmund	3
6	(Germany) Markus Einsiedler	SpVgg Unterhaching	3
6	(Ivory Coast) Salomon Kalou	Hertha BSC	3
6	(Germany) Stefan Kießling	Bayer Leverkusen	3
6	(Poland) Robert Lewandowski	Bayern Munich	3
6	(France) Anthony Modeste	1. FC Köln	3
6	(Italy) Giuseppe Ricciardi	SSV Reutlingen	3
6	(Germany) Simon Terodde	VfL Bochum	3
6	(Nigeria) Anthony Ujah	Werder Bremen	3

== Broadcasting rights ==
In Germany, all matches and the "conference" were broadcast live on pay TV via Sky Sport. Selected matches from the first round to the quarter-finals were broadcast on free TV by Das Erste from ARD. Both semi-final matches and the final were broadcast by both Sky Sport and Das Erste.

The following matches were broadcast live on free German television channel Das Erste:

Round	Matches	Ref.
First round	FC St. Pauli v Borussia Mönchengladbach	
Second round	VfL Wolfsburg v Bayern Munich	
Second round	Schalke 04 v Borussia Mönchengladbach	
Round of 16	Bayern Munich v Darmstadt 98	
Round of 16	FC Augsburg v Borussia Dortmund	
Quarter-finals	VfB Stuttgart v Borussia Dortmund	
Quarter-finals	VfL Bochum v Bayern Munich	
Semi-finals	Bayern Munich v Werder Bremen	
Semi-finals	Hertha BSC v Borussia Dortmund	
Final	Bayern Munich v Borussia Dortmund	

== Prize fund ==
Each participating team received a reward from the TV money and from the central promotional marketing (TV, stadium, and sleeve advertising) by the DFB. It was distributed as about €50 million to the 64 participants of the competition from 2015 to 2016. For wearing the sleeve advertising each participant received, according to the implementing provisions of the DFB-Pokal, €10,000 per game and round.

Achieved round	Premium per team	Summed bonuses
First round	€140,000	
Second round	€268,000	€408,000
Round of 16	€527,000	€935,000
Quarter-finals	€1,041,000	€1,976,000
Semi-finals	€2,073,000	€4,049,000
Final	€2,500,000	€6,549,000
Champion	€1,000,000	€7,549,000
