= 2015–16 Schleswig-Holstein-Liga =

- Season: 2015–16
- Champions: SV Eichede
- Promoted: SV Eichede
- Relegated: Preetzer TSV SV Henstedt-Ulzburg TuRa Meldorf SG Reher-Puls
- Matches: 306
- Top goalscorer: Morten Liebert (37 goals)
- Total attendance: 68,532
- Average attendance: 224

The 2015–16 season of the Schleswig-Holstein-Liga, the highest association football league in the German state of Schleswig-Holstein, was the eighth season of the league at tier five (V) of the German football league system.

The season began on 31 July 2015 and finished on 21 May 2016, interrupted by a winter break from 5 December to 20 February.

== 2015–16 standings ==
The 2015–16 season saw five new clubs in the league, FC Kilia Kiel, TSB Flensburg, Oldenburger SV and SG Reher-Puls, all four promoted from the Verbandsligas while VfR Neumünster was relegated from the Regionalliga Nord.

Of the Schleswig-Holstein-Liga teams only SV Eichede, Eutin 08 and TSB Flensburg applied for a Regionalliga licence for the 2016–17 season, with the Northern German Football Association deciding on 9 May 2016 to grant all applicants a licence.

Pos	Team	Pld	W	D	L	GF	GA	GD	Pts	Qualification or relegation
1	SV Eichede (C, P)	34	26	3	5	92	31	+61	81	Qualification to promotion playoffs
2	Eutin 08	34	25	1	8	108	46	+62	76	
3	Holstein Kiel II (Note: Reserve teams of 3. Liga clubs are ineligible for Regionalliga promotion.)	34	20	8	6	76	31	+45	68	
4	TSB Flensburg	34	19	8	7	73	38	+35	65	
5	SV Todesfelde	34	19	5	10	78	55	+23	62	
6	Heider SV	34	17	7	10	59	46	+13	58	
7	Flensburg 08	34	16	4	14	90	68	+22	52	
8	TSV Kropp	34	14	8	12	71	63	+8	50	
9	TSV Altenholz	34	14	8	12	62	56	+6	50	
10	VfR Neumünster (Note: VfR Neumünster deducted nine points.)	34	16	7	11	62	44	+18	46	
11	Union Neumünster	34	13	4	17	54	62	−8	43	
12	Oldenburger SV	34	13	3	18	76	80	−4	42	
13	FC Kilia Kiel	34	11	6	17	43	64	−21	39	
14	TuS Hartenholm	34	8	6	20	36	90	−54	30	
15	Preetzer TSV (R)	34	6	10	18	45	76	−31	28	Relegation to Verbandsligas
16	SV Henstedt-Ulzburg (Note: SV Henstedt-Ulzburg deducted three points.) (R)	34	8	5	21	38	98	−60	26	Relegation to Verbandsligas
17	TuRa Meldorf (R)	34	6	6	22	38	88	−50	24	Relegation to Verbandsligas
18	SG Reher-Puls (R)	34	4	3	27	40	105	−65	15	Relegation to Verbandsligas

Source: kicker.de, soccerway.com
Rules for classification: 1) Points; 2) Goal difference; 3) Goals scored; 4) head-to-head results; 5) goals scored away from home against opponent; 6) goals scored away from home; 7) drawing of lots
(C) Champions; (P) Promoted; (R) Relegated

=== Top goalscorers ===
The top goal scorers for the season:

Rank	Player	Club	Goals
1	(Germany) Morten Liebert	SV Todesfelde	37
2	(Germany) Florian Stahl	Eutin 08	36
3	(Germany) Freddy Kaps	Oldenburger SV	25
4	(Germany) Arnold Lechler	SV Eichede	22

== Promotion play-off ==
Promotion play-off were to be held at the end of the season to the Regionalliga Nord. The runners-up of the Niedersachsenliga and the champions or, in Hamburg's case, the only team applying for a licence, of the Bremen-Liga, Oberliga Hamburg and Schleswig-Holstein-Liga played each other for two more spot in the Regionalliga. In the promotion round each team met the other just once with the two highest-placed teams in the final table promoted:

Pos	Team	Pld	W	D	L	GF	GA	GD	Pts	Promotion	GER	SVE	ALT	BSV
1	Germania Egestorf (P)	3	1	2	0	5	4	+1	5	Promotion to Regionalliga Nord	—	2–2	2–1	—
2	SV Eichede (P)	3	1	2	0	5	4	+1	5	Promotion to Regionalliga Nord	—	—	—	2–1
3	Altona 93	3	1	1	1	4	3	+1	4		—	1–1	—	—
4	Bremer SV	3	0	1	2	2	5	−3	1		1–1	—	0–2	—

Source: Weltfussball.de
Rules for classification: 1) Points; 2) Head-to-head; 3) Decider;
(P) Promoted
