= Alexander Kaltner =

German footballer (born 1999)

Personal information
- Date of birth: 24 October 1999 (age 27)
- Place of birth: Munich, Germany
- Height: 1.75 m (5 ft 9 in)
- Position: Forward

Team information
- Current team: MTV München

Youth career
- 2007–2018: SpVgg Unterhaching

Senior career*
Years	Team	Apps	(Gls)
2018–2022	SpVgg Unterhaching	12	(1)
2020	→ 1860 Rosenheim (loan)	0	(0)
2022–	MTV München	4	(4)
- * Club domestic league appearances and goals as of 21:41, 24 September 2022 (UTC)

Alexander Kaltner (born 24 October 1999) is a German footballer who plays as a forward for Kreisliga club MTV München.

== Career ==
Kaltner made his professional debut for SpVgg Unterhaching in the 3. Liga on 23 February 2019, coming on as a substitute in the 86th minute for Maximilian Bauer in the 0–1 away loss against Eintracht Braunschweig. In January 2020, Kaltner joined Regionalliga Bayern side TSV 1860 Rosenheim on loan until the end of the season.

Kaltner moved to Kreisliga club MTV München in 2022.
