= DGF Flensborg =

German football club

- Full name: Dansk Gymnastik Forening Flensborg e.V. 1923
- Founded: 9 November 1923
- Ground: Frueskovens Idrætspark
- Chairman: Dieter Lenz
- Manager: Peter Feies
- League: Verbandsliga Schleswig-Holstein-Nord (VII)
- 2018–19: Kreisliga Nordwest (VIII), 2nd (promoted)
- Website: https://www.dgf-flensborg.de
| Home colours | Away colours |

The DGF Flensborg is a German association football club from the city of Flensburg, Schleswig-Holstein.

DGF is the largest of the clubs of the Danish minority in northern Germany. Apart from offering association football, it also has well as boxing, baseball, badminton, handball and inline hockey departments. DGF no longer has an American football department.

== History ==
=== Danish minority ===
The Danish minority in Schleswig-Holstein is currently (2008) considered to consist of about 50,000 people. The Danish government supports the minority financially, (400,000,000 Danish krone in 2004). Since the Bonn-Kopenhagener-Declarations in 1955, the Danish minority enjoys special rights equivalent to the special rights the German minority in Denmark enjoys.

=== Club ===
The club was formed in 1923 as a gymnastics association by the city's Danish minority, as indicated by its Danish language name and the use of the Danish Flensborg rather than the German Flensburg. In 1926, DGF took up football, playing games at the Tivoliplatz. In the following years, the club expanded its number of departments but from 1933, with the rise of the Nazis to power, found itself more and more restricted. From 1937, the club's activities almost ceased altogether due to attempts by Nazis to Germanise the Danish minority.

Upon the return of its members following the Second World War, DFG resumed its activities in 1947. In 1948, some club members left DGF to form another ethnically-Danish club, the IF Stjernen Flensborg. DGF was granted the use of Frueskovens Idrætspark as its home ground by the city of Flensburg. In 1951, an agreement was reached with the German football federation of Schleswig-Holstein and its clubs, granting Danish minority clubs the same rights and duties as their German counterparts, the Sportfrieden von Malente (English: Sports peace of Malente).

Through the support of Danish Football Association, part of the gate receipts from a Denmark national football team versus Norway national football team international were made available to the club and DGF was able to buy Frueskovens Idrætspark. The club had to use old military tents as its change rooms. By joining the Schleswig-Holstein Football Federation they were finally permitted to take part in competitive football.

In 1957, DGF built its own club house and in 1967 the facility was expanded through the addition of change rooms and showers. However, in 1974, the club had to transfer Frueskovens Idrætspark back to the city of Flensburg as they were unable to afford necessary major upgrades.

For its 75th anniversary in 1998, the club attracted Brøndby IF for a friendly. In 2001, Frueskovens Idrætspark once more changed ownership when it was acquired by the Sydslesvigs danske Ungdomsforeninger, a community based Danish organization.

=== On the field ===
DGF entered the Bezirksklasse Nord Schleswig-Holstein (III) in 1951 but could not hold their place. They returned to the Bezirksliga in 1959, and then in 1964 earned promotion to the Amateurliga Schleswig-Holstein, the local third division. They played two season there before being relegated to the 2nd Amateurliga Schleswig-Holstein Nord (IV) in 1966. While winning its league in 1966–67, they missed being promoted and after a 6th-place result the next season failed to qualify for the new Verbandsliga Nord (IV), slipping down to fifth tier Bezirksliga Nord.

Winning another championship in this league in 1968–69, the team gained promotion to the tier four Verbandsliga, where, after a difficult first season, it won the league in 1970–71 and returned to third division football. Coming second-last in the Landesliga in 1972, it was relegated back down straight away. DGF continued in the Verbandsliga as a lower table side, earning a fifth place in 1978–79 as its best result. In 1978, the Verbandsliga was renamed Landesliga and had become a tier five league since 1974, when the Oberliga Nord was reformed. In 1980, the club was relegated once more.

In the Bezirksliga Nord, DGF became a struggler against relegation, finishing one spot above it in each of its first three seasons there and improving from then on. After a couple of seasons in mid-table, the team was relegated further down in 1988 but returned immediately the year after. Mid to lower table finishes remained all the club could archive until a league championship in 1996 meant promotion once more.

Back in the Landesliga (V) the club finished in mid-table once more in the next three seasons until another league reorganisation meant it became part of the new Bezirksoberliga Nord. After dropping down a level in 2005 and returning in 2007, a tenth-place finish in 2008 in the Bezirksoberliga was enough for the club to qualify for the new Verbandsliga Schleswig-Holstein-Nord-West in another league restructuring.

In the 2008–09 season, DGF struggled in the Verbandsliga Schleswig-Holstein-Nord-West (VI), eventually finding itself relegated to the Kreisliga Flensburg. In this league the club came close to promotion in 2010 and 2011 when it finished second on both occasions. It took until 2015 to return to the Verbandsliga after it won a Kreisliga title. The club was relegated back to the now tier-eight Kreisliga in 2017 when the new Landesligas were introduced at tier six but won promotion back to the now seventh-division Verbandsliga in 2019.

== Honours ==
The club's honours:

- Verbandsliga Schleswig-Holstein Nord (IV): 1971
- 2nd Amateurliga Schleswig-Holstein Nord (IV): 1963, 1967
- Bezirksliga Schleswig-Holstein Nord (V–VI): 1969, 1996
- Kreisliga Schleswig-Flensburg 1: 2015

== Recent seasons ==
The recent season-by-season performance of the club:

| Season | Division | Tier | Position |
|---|---|---|---|
| 1999–2000 | Bezirksoberliga Schleswig-Holstein Nord | VI | 3rd |
| 2000–01 | Bezirksoberliga Schleswig-Holstein Nord | VI | 8th |
| 2001–02 | Bezirksoberliga Schleswig-Holstein Nord | VI | 11th |
| 2002–03 | Bezirksoberliga Schleswig-Holstein Nord | VI | 6th |
| 2003–04 | Bezirksoberliga Schleswig-Holstein Nord | VI | 8th |
| 2004–05 | Bezirksoberliga Schleswig-Holstein Nord | VI | 16th ↓ |
| 2005–06 | Bezirksliga Schleswig-Holstein Nord | VII | 6th |
| 2006–07 | Bezirksliga Schleswig-Holstein Nord | VII | 3rd ↑ |
| 2007–08 | Bezirksoberliga Schleswig-Holstein Nord | VI | 10th |
| 2008–09 | Verbandsliga Schleswig-Holstein-Nord-West | VI | 18th ↓ |
| 2009–10 | Kreisliga Flensburg | VII | 2nd |
| 2010–11 | Kreisliga Flensburg | VII | 2nd |
| 2011–12 | Kreisliga Flensburg | VII | 6th |
| 2012–13 | Kreisliga Flensburg | VII | 4th |
| 2013–14 | Kreisliga Schleswig-Flensburg 1 | VII | 5th |
| 2014–15 | Kreisliga Schleswig-Flensburg 1 | VII | 1st ↑ |
| 2015–16 | Verbandsliga Schleswig-Holstein-Nord-West | VI | 14th |
| 2016–17 | Verbandsliga Schleswig-Holstein-Nord-West | VI | 17th ↓ |
| 2017–18 | Kreisliga Nordwest | VIII | 4th |
| 2018–19 | Kreisliga Nordwest | VIII | 2nd ↑ |

- With the introduction of the Regionalligas in 1994 and the 3. Liga in 2008 as the new third tier, below the 2. Bundesliga, all leagues below dropped one tier. With the introduction of the Landesligas in 2017 as the new sixth tier, all leagues from the Verbandsligas below dropped one tier. The Verbandsliga Nord-West was renamed to Verbandsliga Nord.
