= Arnold Lechler =

German-Russian footballer

Personal information
- Date of birth: 28 April 1991 (age 35)
- Height: 1.88 m (6 ft 2 in)
- Position: Forward

Team information
- Current team: SV Curslack-Neuengamme
- Number: 7

Senior career*
Years	Team	Apps	(Gls)
–2013	SC Wentorf		
2013–2014	SV Eichede II	10	(4)
2013–2016	SV Eichede	74	(35)
2016–2017	Sonnenhof Großaspach	8	(0)
2017–2018	Altona 93	9	(1)
2018	ASV Bergedorf 85	8	(6)
2018–	SV Curslack-Neuengamme	28	(14)
- * Club domestic league appearances and goals as of 12 November 2022

Arnold Lechler (born 28 April 1991) is a German-Russian footballer who plays as a forward for Oberliga Hamburg club SV Curslack-Neuengamme.
