= Verbandsliga Schleswig-Holstein-Süd =

- Founded: 2008
- Country: Germany
- State: Schleswig-Holstein
- Number of clubs: 12
- Level on pyramid: Level 7
- Promotion to: Landesliga Schleswig-Holstein
- Relegation to: Kreisliga
- Current champions: Eichholzer SV (2019–20)

The Verbandsliga Schleswig-Holstein-Süd is the seventh tier of the German football league system and the third-highest league in the German state of Schleswig-Holstein, together with five other leagues at this level in the state. The league was formed at the end of the 2007–08 season, to replace the previously existing Bezirksoberligas at this level.

== Overview ==
With the changes to the German football league system in 2008 that went alongside the introduction of the 3. Liga, four new Verbandsligas were formed in Schleswig-Holstein as the sixth tier of the league system, these being:

- Verbandsliga Schleswig-Holstein-Ost (as Süd-Ost)
- Verbandsliga Schleswig-Holstein-West (as Süd-West)
- Verbandsliga Schleswig-Holstein-Nord (as Nord-West)
- Verbandsliga Schleswig-Holstein-Ost (as Nord-Ost)

Previous to that, from 1978 to 2008, a single-division Verbandsliga Schleswig-Holstein existed which was now renamed Oberliga Schleswig-Holstein and received the status of an Oberliga.

These four new Verbandsligas replaced the previously existing four Bezirksoberligas (BOL), who were, until then, divided into northern, southern, eastern and western divisions. The Bezirksoberligas themselves were formed in 1999. Other changes in the league system were the abolishment of the four Bezirksoberligas and the five Bezirksligas below them. Additionally, the regional alignment of the four new Verbandsligas differed from the Bezirksoberligas they replaced, making the change from one to the other more than just a renaming of leagues.

The new Verbandsliga Schleswig-Holstein-Süd was formed from five clubs of the Verbandsliga Schleswig-Holstein (V), ten clubs from the former Bezirksoberliga Schleswig-Holstein-Süd (VI) and two clubs from the Bezirksliga Schleswig-Holstein-Süd (VII), one from the northern division and one from the southern division.

The league champions of each of the six Verbandsligas will earn promotion to the Landesliga Schleswig-Holstein. Below the six Verbandsligas, eleven regional Kreisligas are placed. The bottom teams in the Verbandsligas will be relegated to the Kreisligas while the champions of those will earn promotion to the Verbandsligas. The Verbandsliga Süd covers the following three Kreise:

- Herzogtum Lauenburg
- Lübeck
- Stormarn

From the 2017–18 season onwards, the Verbandsligas were contracted to 16 teams each and downgraded to seventh tier with the introduction of the new Landesliga Schleswig-Holstein (VI). For the 2020–21 season, however, relegation was suspended after the previous one and the league temporarily contracted to 12 teams, losing eight from 2019–20 to the recreated Süd-Ost division.

== League champions ==
Season	Champions
2008–09	SV Eichede
2009–10	NTSV Strand 08
2010–11	Breitenfelder SV
2011–12	Dornbreite Lübeck
2012–13	SV Eichede II
2013–14	Eutin 08
2014–15	Oldenburger SV
2015–16	NTSV Strand 08
2016–17	Dornbreite Lübeck
2017–18	Lübecker SC
2018–19	Büchen-Siebeneichener SV
2019–20	Eichholzer SV

- In 2019 Breitenfelder SV was also promoted as runner-up.
- In 2020 the season was abandoned due to the coronavirus pandemic in Germany and table placings were determined by points per game averages. Sereetzer SV was also promoted as runner-up.

== Founding members ==
The league was formed from 18 clubs, which had played in the following leagues in 2007-08:

- From the Verbandsliga Schleswig-Holstein:
  - Breitenfelder SV, 15th
  - FC Dornbreite Lübeck, 16th
  - SV Eichede, 17th
  - TSV Bargteheide, 18th
  - Spvg Rot Weiß Moisling, 19th
- From the Bezirksoberliga Schleswig-Holstein-Süd:
  - GW Siebenbäumen, 2nd
  - Moellner SV, 3rd
  - VfL Oldesloe, 4th
  - Sereetzer SV, 5th
  - SV Preußen 09 Reinfeld, 7th
  - Oldenburger SV, 8th
  - ATSV Stockelsdorf, 9th
  - Eintracht Groß Grönau, 11th
  - TSV Gudow, 12th
  - TSV Pansdorf, 13th
- From the Bezirksliga Schleswig-Holstein-Süd (Nord):
  - SpVgg Eutin 08, 1st
  - TSV Lensahn, 2nd
- From the Bezirksliga Schleswig-Holstein-Süd (Süd):
  - AKM Lübeck, 1st
