= Verbandsliga Schleswig-Holstein-Nord =

- Founded: 2008
- Country: Germany
- State: Schleswig-Holstein
- Number of clubs: 12
- Level on pyramid: Level 7
- Promotion to: Landesliga Schleswig-Holstein
- Relegation to: Kreisliga
- Current champions: TuS Rotenhof (2019–20)

The Verbandsliga Schleswig-Holstein-Nord is the seventh tier of the German football league system and the third-highest league in the German state of Schleswig-Holstein, together with five other leagues at this level in the state. The league was formed at the end of the 2007-08 season to replace the previously existing Bezirksoberligas at this level.

== Overview ==
With the changes to the German football league system in 2008 that went alongside the introduction of the 3. Liga, four new Verbandsligas were formed in Schleswig-Holstein as the sixth tier of the league system, these being:

- Verbandsliga Schleswig-Holstein-Nord (as Nord-West)
- Verbandsliga Schleswig-Holstein-Ost (as Nord-Ost)
- Verbandsliga Schleswig-Holstein-Süd (as Süd-Ost)
- Verbandsliga Schleswig-Holstein-West (as Süd-West)

Previous to that, from 1978 to 2008, a single-division Verbandsliga Schleswig-Holstein existed which was now renamed Oberliga Schleswig-Holstein and received the status of an Oberliga.

These four new Verbandsligas replaced the previously existing four Bezirksoberligas (BOL), who were, until then, divided into northern, southern, eastern and western divisions. The Bezirksoberligas themselves were formed in 1999. Other changes in the league system were the abolishment of the four Bezirksoberligas and the five Bezirksligas below them. Additionally, the regional alignment of the four new Verbandsligas differed from the Bezirksoberligas they replaced, making the change from one to the other more than just a renaming of leagues.

The new Verbandsliga Schleswig-Holstein-Nord was formed from one club of the Verbandsliga Schleswig-Holstein (V), ten clubs from the former Bezirksoberliga Schleswig-Holstein-Nord (VI), five clubs from the Bezirksoberliga Schleswig-Holstein-West (VI), one club from the Bezirksliga Schleswig-Holstein-Nord (VII) and one club from the Kreisliga Schleswig (VIII).

The league champions of each of the six Verbandsligas will earn promotion to the Landesliga Schleswig-Holstein. Below the six Verbandsligas, eleven regional Kreisligas are placed. The bottom teams in the Verbandsligas will be relegated to the Kreisligas while the champions of those will earn promotion to the Verbandsligas. The Verbandsliga Nord covers the following four Kreise:

- Dithmarschen
- Flensburg
- Nordfriesland
- Schleswig

With DGF Flensborg and IF Stjernen Flensborg, the league has two clubs of the Danish minority in Germany in its ranks. From the 2017–18 season onwards, the Verbandsligas were contracted to 16 teams each and downgraded to seventh tier with the introduction of the new Landesliga Schleswig-Holstein (VI). For the 2020–21 season, however, relegation was suspended after the previous one and the division temporarily contracted to 12 teams, losing four to the recreated Nord-Ost group.

== League champions ==
Season	Champions
2008–09	SG Sylt-Haddeby
2009–10	FC Sylt
2010–11	Husumer SV
2011–12	1. Schleswiger SV 06
2012–13	Husumer SV
2013–14	FC Angeln 02
2014–15	TSB Flensburg
2015–16	Frisia Risum-Lindholm
2016–17	TSV Friedrichsberg
2017–18	TSV Nordmark Satrup
2018–19	TuS Collegia Jubek
2019–20	TuS Rotenhof

- In 2009 ETSV Weiche was promoted instead of SG Sylt-Haddeby.
- In 2018 and 2019 IF Stjernen Flensborg and MTV Tellingstedt were also promoted respectively as runners-up.
- In 2020 the season was abandoned due to the coronavirus pandemic in Germany and table placings were determined by points per game averages. Büdelsdorfer TSV was also promoted as runner-up.

== Founding members ==
The league was formed from 18 clubs, which played in the following leagues in 2007-08:

- From the Verbandsliga Schleswig-Holstein:
  - ETSV Weiche, 14th
- From the Bezirksoberliga Schleswig-Holstein-Nord:
  - TSB Flensburg, 2nd
  - FC Angeln 02, 3rd
  - SV Frisia 03 Lindholm, 4th
  - IF Stjernen Flensborg, 5th
  - MTV Leck, 6th
  - TSV Rantrum, 7th
  - SpVgg Flensburg 08 II, 8th
  - FC Sörup- Sterup, 9th
  - DGF Flensborg, 10th
  - VFR Schleswig, 11th
- From the Bezirksoberliga Schleswig-Holstein-West:
  - TSV Nordhastedt, 2nd
  - TuRa Meldorf, 3rd
  - MTV Tellingstedt, 4th
  - BW Wesselburen, 6th
  - Marner TV, 7th
- From the Bezirksliga Schleswig-Holstein-Nord:
  - TSV Friedrichsberg, 1st
- From the Kreisliga Schleswig:
  - FC Sylt-Haddeby
