= Sebastian Gärtner =

German footballer

Personal information
- Date of birth: 3 February 1993 (age 33)
- Place of birth: Nuremberg, Germany
- Height: 1.78 m (5 ft 10 in)
- Position: Midfielder

Youth career
- –2005: Post SV Nürnberg
- 2005–2012: 1. FC Nürnberg

Senior career*
Years	Team	Apps	(Gls)
2011–2014	1. FC Nürnberg II	78	(8)
2013–2014	1. FC Nürnberg	0	(0)
2014–2015	Mainz 05 II	8	(1)
2016–2017	Waldhof Mannheim	25	(3)
2016–2017	Waldhof Mannheim II	6	(1)

International career^{‡}
2009	Germany U17	2	(0)
2010–2011	Germany U18	7	(1)
2011–2012	Germany U19	2	(0)
- * Club domestic league appearances and goals as of 04:53, 27 September 2018 (UTC) ‡ National team caps and goals as of 04:53, 27 September 2018 (UTC)

Sebastian Gärtner (born 3 February 1993) is a German footballer who plays as a midfielder.
