= Marco Rosenzweig =

German footballer

Personal information
- Date of birth: 15 January 1996 (age 30)
- Place of birth: Bayreuth, Germany
- Height: 1.80 m (5 ft 11 in)
- Position: Defender

Team information
- Current team: TSV Buchbach
- Number: 6

Youth career
- FC Falke Markt Schwaben
- –2015: SpVgg Unterhaching

Senior career*
Years	Team	Apps	(Gls)
2014–2015	SpVgg Unterhaching II	11	(0)
2015–2018	SpVgg Unterhaching	15	(0)
2018–	TSV Buchbach	53	(3)
- * Club domestic league appearances and goals as of 16 October 2020

Marco Rosenzweig (born 16 January 1996) is a German footballer who plays as a defender for TSV Buchbach.
