= Fırat Suçsuz =

Turkish association football player

Personal information
- Date of birth: 27 June 1996 (age 30)
- Place of birth: Berlin, Germany
- Height: 1.72 m (5 ft 8 in)
- Positions: Left-back; left winger

Team information
- Current team: BFC Preussen
- Number: 20

Youth career
- –2011: Frohnauer SC
- 2011–2014: Hertha BSC
- 2014–2015: RB Leipzig

Senior career*
Years	Team	Apps	(Gls)
2015–2016	RB Leipzig II	30	(0)
2016–2017	VfR Aalen	2	(0)
2017	→ Carl Zeiss Jena (loan)	14	(3)
2017–2019	Carl Zeiss Jena	38	(2)
2019–2020	Fatih Karagümrük	2	(0)
2020	Somaspor	6	(0)
2020–2023	Viktoria Berlin	14	(0)
2023	Tennis Borussia	13	(0)
2023–	BFC Preussen	7	(0)

International career
2012–2013	Turkey U17	6	(1)
2013–2014	Turkey U18	5	(0)
- * Club domestic league appearances and goals as of 19:48, 26 November 2023 (UTC)

Fırat Suçsuz (born 27 June 1996) is a professional footballer who plays as a left-back or left winger for BFC Preussen. Born in Germany, he has represented Turkey at youth level.

== Career ==
In January 2019, Suçsuz agreed the termination of his contract with 3. Liga side Carl Zeiss Jena. On 14 January, he then joined Fatih Karagümrük in the Turkish TFF Second League.
