= Maximilian Bauer (footballer, born 1995) =

German footballer

Personal information
- Full name: Maximilian Bauer
- Date of birth: 23 February 1995 (age 31)
- Place of birth: Dachau, Germany
- Height: 1.75 m (5 ft 9 in)
- Position: Defender

Team information
- Current team: 1. FC Schweinfurt 05
- Number: 2

Youth career
- TuS Geretsried
- –2012: Bayern Munich
- 2013–2014: SpVgg Unterhaching

Senior career*
Years	Team	Apps	(Gls)
2014	SpVgg Unterhaching II	12	(1)
2014–2019	SpVgg Unterhaching	49	(1)
2015	→ SV Heimstetten (loan)	3	(0)
2020–	1. FC Schweinfurt 05	2	(0)
- * Club domestic league appearances and goals as of 13:03, 14 December 2020 (UTC)

Maximilian Bauer (born 23 February 1995) is a German footballer who plays as a defender for 1. FC Schweinfurt 05.

== Honours ==
- Regionalliga Bayern: 2019–21
