= Thomas Steinherr =

German footballer

Personal information
- Date of birth: 4 May 1993 (age 33)
- Place of birth: Friedberg, Germany
- Height: 1.70 m (5 ft 7 in)
- Position: Left midfielder

Team information
- Current team: TSV 1860 Rosenheim
- Number: 17

Youth career
- FC Stätzling
- –2012: FC Augsburg

Senior career*
Years	Team	Apps	(Gls)
2012–2013	FC Augsburg II	21	(2)
2013–2014	SpVgg Unterhaching	32	(2)
2014–2015	VfR Aalen	0	(0)
2015–2018	SpVgg Unterhaching	84	(11)
2018–2020	FC 08 Homburg	48	(5)
2020–2021	FC Carl Zeiss Jena	7	(1)
2021–	TSV 1860 Rosenheim	20	(0)
- * Club domestic league appearances and goals as of 23 November 2021

Thomas Steinherr (born 4 May 1993) is a German footballer who plays as a winger for TSV 1860 Rosenheim.
