= SV Eichede =

German football club

- Full name: Sportverein Eichede von 1947 e.V.
- Founded: 15 May 1947
- Ground: Ernst-Wagener-Stadion
- Capacity: 2,000
- Chairman: Olaf Gehrken
- Manager: Martin Steinbek
- League: Oberliga Schleswig-Holstein (V)
- 2025–26: Oberliga Schleswig-Holstein, 4th of 18
- Website: https://www.sveichede.de
Home colours	Away colours

The SV Eichede is a German association football club from the Eichede suburb of Steinburg, Schleswig-Holstein.

The club's greatest success has been to earn promotion to the tier four Regionalliga Nord in 2013 and again in 2016. On each occasion, the club was relegated from the Regionalliga after just one season.

== History ==
The club was formed in 1947 and played for the first five decades as a local amateur team. SV for the first time made an appearance in the highest league of the state in 1994 when it was promoted to the tier five Verbandsliga Schleswig-Holstein, helped by the introduction of the Regionalligas that season which allowed an increased number of promoted teams to the league. After coming sixth in the league in its first season there the club's results declined and it was relegated again in 1998.

Eichede returned to the Verbandsliga in 2003 and finished as high as runners-up in 2006 before being relegated again in 2008. Changes to the league system in 2008 meant that the Verbandsliga Schleswig-Holstein was renamed to Schleswig-Holstein-Liga and the four regional divisions below to Verbandsligas. SV Eichede was grouped in the Verbandsliga Schleswig-Holstein-Süd-Ost, won this league and moved up to the highest state level again.

In the Schleswig-Holstein-Liga, the club became a top side, finishing in the top four in all of the next four seasons and eventually winning the league in 2012–13. Through this it earned promotion to the tier four Regionalliga Nord for the first time, while the club's reserve team won promotion to the Schleswig-Holstein-Liga at the same time.

SV Eichede played the 2013–14 season in the Regionalliga but came only seventeenth and was relegated again, dropping back to the Schleswig-Holstein-Liga, while the reserve team had to drop back to the Verbandsliga. A league title in 2015–16 and success in the promotion round took the club back up to the Regionalliga for 2016–17, only to suffer an immediate return to the renamed Oberliga Schleswig-Holstein.

== Honours ==
The team's honours:

- Schleswig-Holstein-Liga: 2013, 2016; runners-up 2006, 2011
- Verbandsliga Schleswig-Holstein-Süd-Ost: 2009, 2013^{‡}

^{‡} Won by reserve team.

== Recent seasons ==
The recent season-by-season performance of the club:

Year	Division	Tier	Position
1999–2000	Bezirksoberliga Schleswig-Holstein-Süd	VI	14th↓
2000–01	Bezirksliga Schleswig-Holstein-Süd	VII	6th
2001–02	Bezirksliga Schleswig-Holstein-Süd	VII	1st↑
2002–03	Bezirksoberliga Schleswig-Holstein-Süd	VI	2nd↑
2003–04	Verbandsliga Schleswig-Holstein	V	8th
2004–05	Verbandsliga Schleswig-Holstein	V	8th
2005–06	Verbandsliga Schleswig-Holstein	V	2nd
2006–07	Verbandsliga Schleswig-Holstein	V	8th
2007–08	Verbandsliga Schleswig-Holstein	V	17th↓
2008–09	Verbandsliga Schleswig-Holstein-Süd-Ost	VI	1st↑
2009–10	Schleswig-Holstein-Liga	V	3rd
2010–11	Schleswig-Holstein-Liga	V	2nd
2011–12	Schleswig-Holstein-Liga	V	4th
2012–13	Schleswig-Holstein-Liga	V	1st↑
2013–14	Regionalliga Nord	IV	17th↓
2014–15	Schleswig-Holstein-Liga	V	3rd
2015–16	Schleswig-Holstein-Liga	V	1st↑
2016–17	Regionalliga Nord	IV	18th↓
2017–18	Oberliga Schleswig-Holstein	V	5th
2018–19	Oberliga Schleswig-Holstein	V	7th
2019–20	Oberliga Schleswig-Holstein	V	5th
2020–21	Oberliga Schleswig-Holstein	V	1st
2021–22	Oberliga Schleswig-Holstein	V	2nd
2022–23	Oberliga Schleswig-Holstein	V	2nd
2023–24	Oberliga Schleswig-Holstein	V	2nd

- With the introduction of the Regionalligas in 1994 and the 3. Liga in 2008 as the new third tier, below the 2. Bundesliga, all leagues below dropped one tier. The Verbandsliga Schleswig-Holstein was renamed to Schleswig-Holstein-Liga and elevated to Oberliga status in 2008 while the leagues below were renamed to Verbandsliga. With the introduction of the Landesligas in 2017 as the new sixth tier, below the Oberliga, all leagues below dropped one tier. The Schleswig-Holstein-Liga was renamed to Oberliga Schleswig-Holstein.

↑ Promoted	↓ Relegated
