= SpVgg Unterhaching =

German association football club from Unterhaching, Bavaria

- Full name: Spielvereinigung Unterhaching e.V.
- Nickname: Haching
- Founded: 1 January 1925; 101 years ago
- Ground: Sportpark Unterhaching
- Capacity: 15,053
- Chairman: Manfred Schwabl
- Coach: Holger Seitz
- League: Regionalliga Bayern (IV)
- 2025–26: Regionalliga Bayern, 3rd of 18
- Website: spvggunterhaching.de
Home colours	Away colours

Spielvereinigung Unterhaching (German pronunciation: [ˈʃpiːlfɛɐ̯ˈʔaɪ̯nɪɡʊŋ ʔʊntɐˈhaxɪŋ]) is a German sports club in Unterhaching, a semi-rural municipality on the southern outskirts of the Bavarian capital Munich. The club is widely known for playing in the first-division association football league Bundesliga alongside its more famous cousins, Bayern Munich and 1860 Munich, for two seasons between 1999 and 2001, while the club's bobsleigh department has captured several world and Olympic titles. The football team won promotion into the 3. Liga (third tier) after beating Cottbus 4–1 on aggregate in June 2023. The club was established as an independent football club on 1 January 1925. It was dissolved in 1933 by the Nazis as "politically unreliable" and re-established in 1945.

== History ==
=== Early history ===
Originally part of the gymnastics and sports club TSV Hachinger, SpVgg Unterhaching was established as an independent football club on 1 January 1925. Their first promotion to a higher division came in 1931 and they went on to be promoted to the A-Klasse a year later. However, the club was dissolved in 1933 as it was regarded as "politically unreliable" by the Nazis and was not re-established until after the end of World War II in 1945 to resume play in the amateur fourth division B-Klasse.

=== A rise through the ranks ===
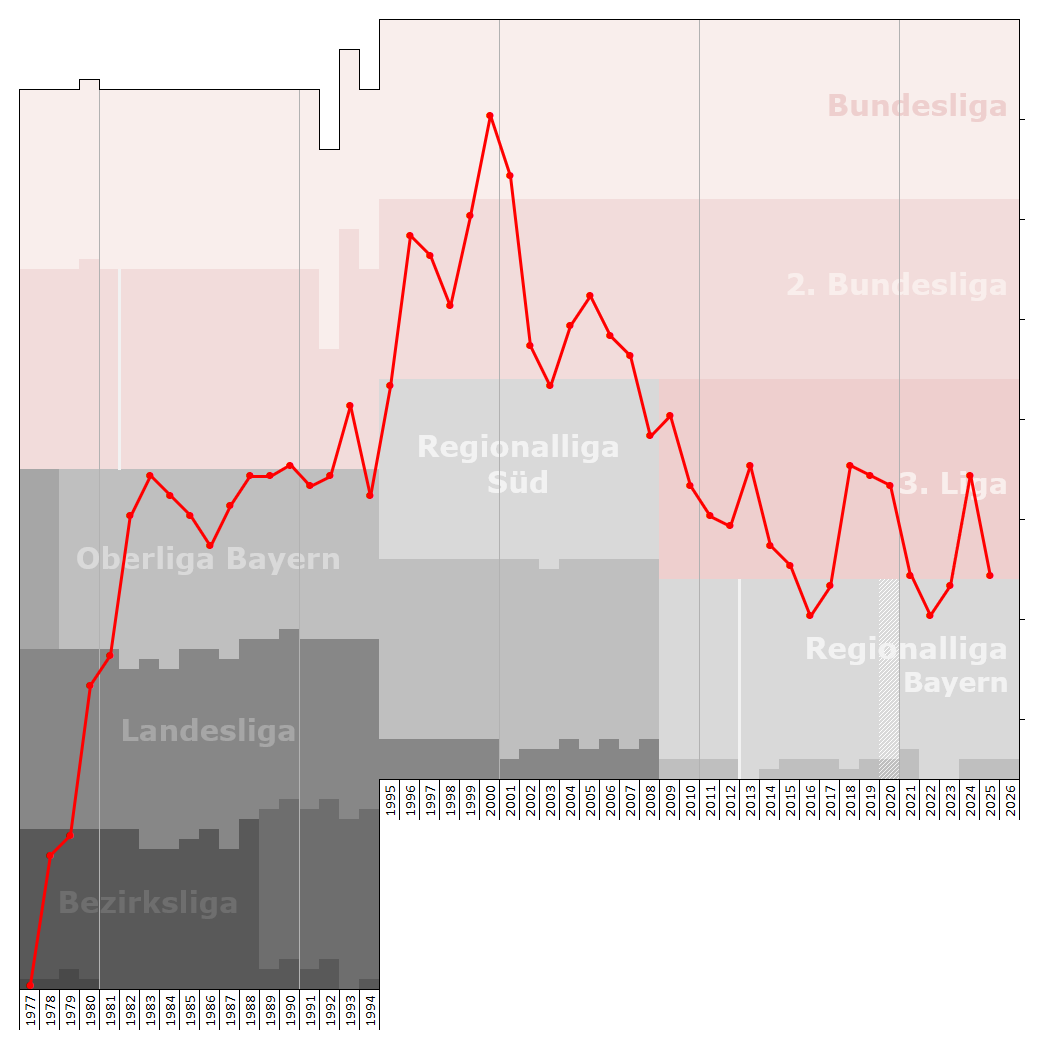
Historical chart of Unterhaching league performance

Unterhaching's football team was only an anonymous local amateur team with no significant successes until a climb through league ranks that began in 1976 with promotion from B-Klasse to A-Klasse play. A first-place finished earned the club quick promotion to the Bezirksliga in 1977. Continued good play put the team into the fourth-division Landesliga Bayern-Süd in 1979 and then the Oberliga Bayern (III), the highest amateur division at the time, by 1981.

Unterhaching finished first there in 1983 to earn an appearance in the playoff round for the 2. Bundesliga, but failed to advance. They suffered a similar fate in 1988 when they next appeared in the promotion round.

The club finally emerged from the Oberliga to play in the 2. Bundesliga in 1989, but were quickly relegated after a 20th-place finish. Promoted a second time in 1992, they were once again sent down after a marginally better 18th-place result. Unterhaching next appeared in the second division in 1995 after a first-place finish in the new Regionalliga Süd (III).

=== Unterhaching in Bundesliga ===
With their return to the 2. Bundesliga in the 1995–96 season the club would begin a period that would see them earn their best ever results. They finished 4th that season, then slipped to 6th and 11th-place results in their next two campaigns before securing promotion to the top-flight Bundesliga after a 2nd-place finish in 1999 season.

They went on to surprise everyone with a respectable 10th-place result in their inaugural Bundesliga season and also famously played the spoiler's role in deciding who would win the championship that year. Their first Bundesliga win came in just their second match of the season, with a 2–0 victory over MSV Duisburg at home. While struggling in away matches, Unterhaching remained undefeated at home in nine games before losing 0–2 to their stronger neighbours, Bayern Munich. Prior to this loss, they had earned wins at home in matches against highly favoured teams like VfB Stuttgart and Borussia Dortmund, beating them 2–0 and 1–0 respectively. They earned their first away win in the Bundesliga by beating VfB Stuttgart 2–0 once again.

On the final matchday of the season, visiting Bayer Leverkusen needed only a draw in Unterhaching to secure their first national title, but instead went down to defeat to the determined home side. Things took a sinister turn for Leverkusen when Michael Ballack scored an own goal that put home side ahead in the 20th minute. Their title hopes ended when Haching midfielder Markus Oberleitner made the score 2–0 in the 72nd minute. Meanwhile, Bayern Munich beat Werder Bremen 3–1 at home and were able to overtake Leverkusen on goal difference to snatch away the title. With a 10th-place result, Unterhaching finished ahead of long-established sides Borussia Dortmund and Schalke 04. They ended the season with the league's fifth best home record with 10 wins and 5 draws in 17 matches having lost only to Bayern Munich and 1. FC Kaiserslautern.

Goalkeeper Gerhard Tremmel, defenders Alexander Strehmel and Jochen Seitz, midfielders Markus Oberleitner and André Breitenreiter and striker Altin Rraklli were memorable players of the team. Breitenreiter and Rraklli scored 13 Bundesliga goals between them that season.

However, the start of the 2000–01 season was a nightmare for Unterhaching as they would win only one and draw two of their first eight matches. While the team went undefeated in its next six matches, they were unable to maintain that form and at the mid-season break were only out of the relegation zone on goal difference. The second half of the season was just as dismal, and although they earned wins over local rivals Bayern Munich and 1860 Munich, their campaign would end with a 16th-place result and relegation.

As the season drew to a close Unterhaching was once again in a position to help Bayern Munich win another title. Needing only to hold second-place Schalke 04 to a draw in their final match to ensure Bayern's win, Unterhaching held 2–0 and 3–2 advantages before finally succumbing 3–5 to Schalke. Bayern then had to make their own way to the championship with at least a draw against Hamburger SV which they only narrowly managed on a Patrik Andersson equalizer (1–1) deep into stoppage time.

Ironically, in the middle of their poor season, SpVgg Unterhaching would emerge as winners of the last DFB-Hallenpokal, an indoor football tournament staged during the winter break of the Bundesliga season from 1987 to 2001.

=== Recent history ===
The club's struggles continued after their relegation to the 2. Bundesliga. Needing an away win in their final match of the season in order to avoid being sent down to the Regionalliga Süd (III), they instead went down to a 0–3 defeat to Karlsruher SC and finished in 15th place. They re-bounded the following season, taking the Regionalliga title, and making their way back to second division competition. Subsequently, Haching has delivered poor results in the 2. Bundesliga, narrowly avoiding being relegated again in both 2004 and 2006 before finally dropping into the Regionalliga in 2007, finishing 16th in the table due to FC Carl Zeiss Jena's 2–1 win against FC Augsburg.

In the 2007–08 season, the club was never really in contention for a 2. Bundesliga return but did qualify for the new 3. Liga. In its first season in the new, nationwide 3. Liga, the club was close to promotion, but a loss 3–4-loss against Carl Zeiss Jena on the 37th matchday earned them a fall from second to fourth place, and a prolonged stay in the third league.

In 2009–10 the club started well, but went down the table during winter. 2008–09's successful coach Ralph Hasenhüttl got replaced by the 1990-world champion Klaus Augenthaler, who led the team to a finish on a secure 11th place.

The club finished one place above the relegation zone in the 3. Liga in 2013–14, coming 17th but was relegated to the tier four Regionalliga Bayern at the end of the 2014–15 season. It qualified for the 2015–16 DFB-Pokal where it knocked-out FC Ingolstadt 04 and RB Leipzig before losing to Bayer Leverkusen in the third round.

In the 2022–23 season, Unterhaching returned to the 3. Liga as champions of the Regionalliga Bayern.

== Honours ==
The club's honours:

=== League ===
- 2. Bundesliga (II)
  - Runners-up: 1998–99
- Regionalliga Süd (III)
  - Champions: 1994–95, 2002–03
- Bayernliga (III)
  - Champions: 1983, 1988, 1989, 1992
  - Runners-up: 1991
- Regionalliga Bayern (IV)
  - Champions: 2016–17, 2022–23
- Landesliga Bayern-Süd (IV)
  - Champions: 1981
  - Runners-up: 2001^{‡}
- Bezirksoberliga Oberbayern (VI)
  - Champions: 1999^{‡}

=== Cup ===
- Bavarian Cup
  - Winners: 2008, 2012, 2015
  - Runners-up: 2016, 2025
- Oberbayern Cup
  - Winners: 2004^{‡}, 2008, 2009

=== Youth ===
- Bavarian Under 19 championship
  - Champions: 2004, 2008, 2011
  - Runners-up: 2007, 2015, 2016
- Bavarian Under 17 championship
  - Champions: 2002, 2004, 2011, 2016
  - Runners-up: 2007, 2009
- Bavarian Under 15 championship
  - Champions: 2011
  - Runners-up: 1993, 2004, 2006, 2013, 2015, 2016
- ^{‡} Reserve team

== Friendships ==
The various fan groups maintain fan friendships with fans of FC Ingolstadt 04.

== Players ==
=== First-team squad ===
As of 17 September 2026

Note: Flags indicate national team as defined under FIFA eligibility rules; some limited exceptions apply. Players may hold more than one non-FIFA nationality.

No.	Pos.	Nation	Player
1	GK	KOS	Erion Avdija
4	DF	GER	Alexander Winkler (captain)
5	MF	GER	Ben Westermeier
6	DF	GER	Timon Obermeier
8	DF	GER	Manuel Stiefler
9	FW	GER	Jeroen Krupa
10	MF	GER	Mike Gevorgyan
11	FW	GER	Alexander Beusch
13	DF	AUT	Luis Pfluger
17	MF	GER	Samuel Weiß
18	MF	GER	Dominik Lindermeir
20	DF	SVK	Milan Kodaj
21	DF	GER	Samuel Krenzer
22	FW	GER	Cornelius Pfeiffer

No.	Pos.	Nation	Player
24	FW	GER	Moritz Müller
25	DF	GER	Elia Di Salvo
26	DF	GER	Andy Breuer
27	DF	GER	Markus Schwabl
29	MF	CRO	David Michelini
32	MF	GER	Nick Kaulfers
33	DF	GER	Luis Schäfer
34	GK	GER	Maurice Dehler
35	GK	GER	Jose Kohler
36	MF	GER	Niklas Pfeiffer
37	DF	GER	Ferdinand Borne
38	MF	GER	Constantin Strunz
39	DF	BIH	Tarik Čirak
46	MF	GER	Marinus Spann

== Recent managers ==
Recent managers of the club:

Manager	Start	Finish
Wolfgang Frank	1 July 2002	1 April 2004
Harry Deutinger	2 April 2004	30 June 2004
Andreas Brehme	1 July 2004	11 April 2005
Harry Deutinger	12 April 2005	19 March 2007
Ralph Hasenhüttl	20 March 2007	31 March 2007
Werner Lorant	23 March 2007	3 October 2007
Ralph Hasenhüttl	4 October 2007	22 February 2010
Matthias Lust	23 February 2010	22 March 2010
Klaus Augenthaler	23 March 2010	30 June 2011
Heiko Herrlich	1 September 2011	25 May 2012
Claus Schromm	25 May 2012	3 January 2014
Manuel Baum	3 January 2012	19 March 2014
Christian Ziege	20 March 2014	25 March 2015
Claus Schromm	26 March 2015	29 July 2020
Arie van Lent	18 August 2020	30 June 2021
Sandro Wagner	1 July 2021	30 June 2023
Marc Unterberger	30 June 2023	1 December 2024
Sven Bender	1 December 2024	3 January 2025
Heiko Herrlich	3 January 2025	21 March 2025
Sven Bender	28 March 2025	30 June 2026
Janek Frensch	1 July 2026	17 September 2026
Holger Seitz	17 September 2026	

== Recent seasons ==
The recent season-by-season performance of the club:

Season	Division	Tier	Position
1998–99	2. Bundesliga	II	2nd ↑
1999–2000	Bundesliga	I	10th
2000–01	Bundesliga	I	16th ↓
2001–02	2. Bundesliga	II	15th ↓
2002–03	Regionalliga Süd	III	1st ↑
2003–04	2. Bundesliga	II	13th
2004–05	2. Bundesliga	II	10th
2005–06	2. Bundesliga	II	14th
2006–07	2. Bundesliga	II	16th ↓
2007–08	Regionalliga Süd	III	6th
2008–09	3. Liga	III	4th
2009–10	3. Liga	III	11th
2010–11	3. Liga	III	14th
2011–12	3. Liga	III	15th
2012–13	3. Liga	III	9th
2013–14	3. Liga	III	17th
2014–15	3. Liga	III	19th ↓
2015–16	Regionalliga Bayern	IV	4th
2016–17	Regionalliga Bayern	IV	1st ↑
2017–18	3. Liga	III	9th
2018–19	3. Liga	III	10th
2019–20	3. Liga	III	11th
2020–21	3. Liga	III	20th ↓
2021–22	Regionalliga Bayern	IV	4th
2022–23	Regionalliga Bayern	IV	1st ↑
2023–24	3. Liga	III	9th
2024–25	3. Liga	III	20th ↓
2025–26	Regionalliga Bayern	IV	3rd

- With the introduction of the Regionalligas in 1994 and the 3. Liga in 2008 as the new third tier, below the 2. Bundesliga, all leagues below dropped one tier.

Key

↑Promoted	↓ Relegated

== Reserve team ==
SpVgg Unterhaching II (or SpVgg Unterhaching Amateure) belong to the Bayernliga since 2001, coming ninth in the 2007–08 season of this league. Due to a number of clubs in the league not receiving a licence for the Regionalliga, the team gained entry to the Regionalliga Süd for the 2008–09 season. The team returned to the Bayernliga again after being relegated in 2009.

In March 2015, the club announced that it would withdraw its reserve team at the end of the 2014–15 season after a rule change that allowed 3. Liga Clubs to do so. SpVgg Unterhaching stated financial reasons for this step.

== Stadium ==
SpVgg Unterhaching's home stadium is the municipal Stadion am Sportpark (capacity 15,053), now known as Alpenbauer Sportpark under a sponsorship arrangement with the club. The club's fan base is local in character, although it has developed a small following as one of Germany's "Kult" teams.

Until 1960, Haching played their home matches at the Jahnstraße football field and moved then to the Grünauer Allee stadium, which has about 4,000 standing places and where they played before the Sportpark stadium opened in April 1992. The Grünauer Allee stadium is now home ground of the club's reserve squad, Haching II, which is currently playing in the fourth-division Oberliga Bayern. The Grünauer Allee stadium is also the home ground of Fortuna Unterhaching, established in 1992 and playing close to the bottom end of the German league system. During winter, Fortuna Unterhaching shares the artificial football pitch owned by SpVgg Unterhaching.

== Bobsleigh ==
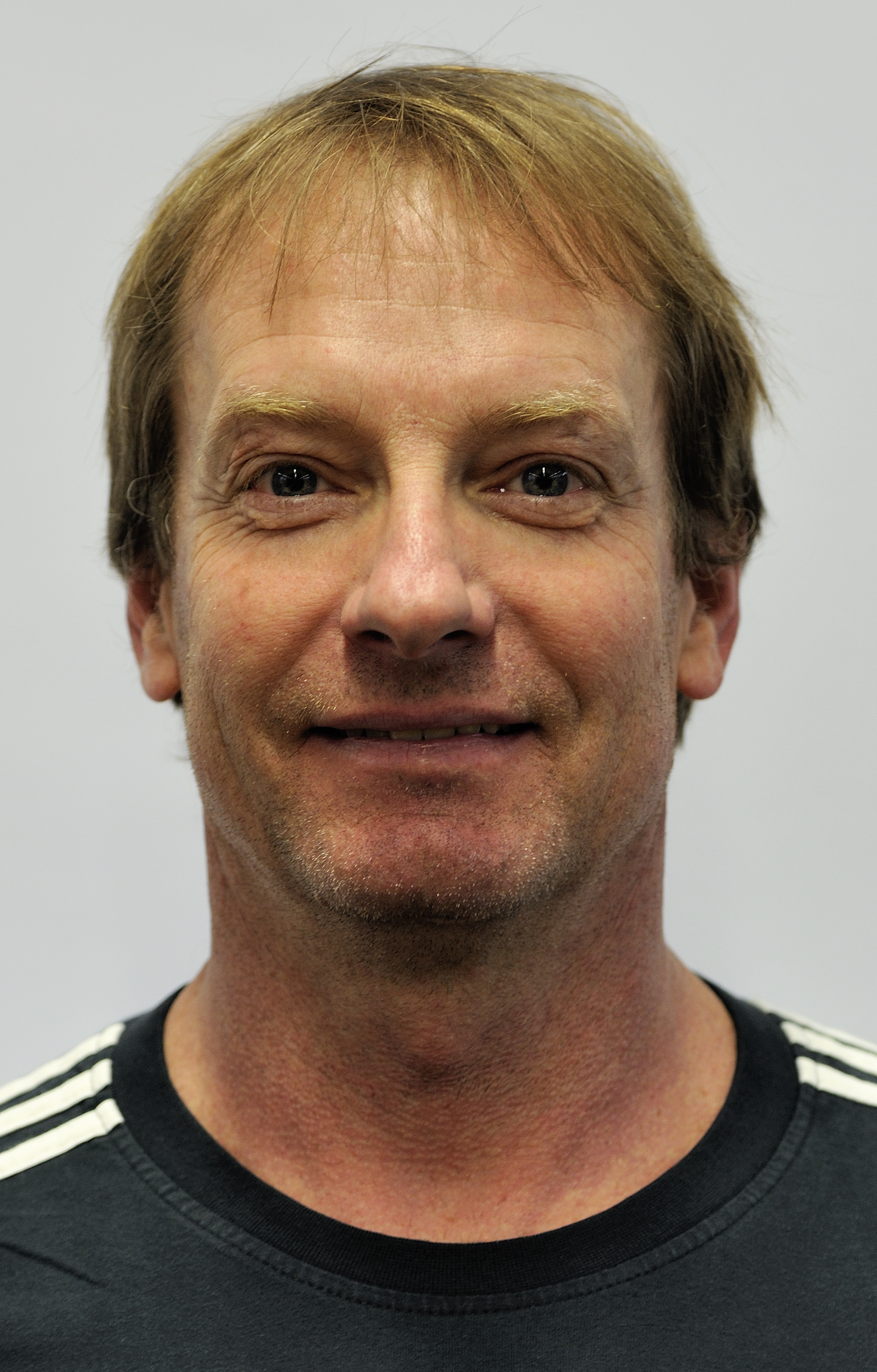
Christoph Langen – SpVgg Unterhaching's most successful sportsperson.

In 1975, local entrepreneur and club sponsor Anton Schrobenhauser († 1982) founded the bobsleigh department, which he presided over until 1979. The club's bobsledders have since achieved a number of excellent results on the national and international level.

Numerous Olympic medals and world championship titles make Christoph Langen Unterhaching's outstanding bobsledder. His honours include:

- Olympics 2-man crew: 2002 (Gold); 1992, 1998 (Bronze)
- Olympics 4-man crew: 1998 (Gold)
- World champion 2-man crew: 1993, 1995, 1996, 2000, 2001
- World champion 4-man crew: 1996, 2001
- World Cup 2-man crew: 1996, 1999, 2004
- World Cup 4-man crew: 1996, 1999
- European champion 2-man crew: 1994, 1995, 1996, 2001, 2004
- European champion 4-man crew: 1996, 1999
