= 2025–26 Regionalliga =

18th season of the Regionalliga

Regionalliga
- Season: 2025–26
- Champions: SV Meppen (Nord); Lokomotive Leipzig (Nordost); Fortuna Köln (West); Sonnenhof Großaspach (Südwest); 1. FC Nürnberg II (Bayern)
- Promoted: SV Meppen; Fortuna Köln; Sonnenhof Großaspach; Würzburger Kickers
- Relegated: Blau-Weiß Lohne; Altona 93; ZFC Meuselwitz; FC Eilenburg; Hertha Zehlendorf; Wuppertaler SV; SSVg Velbert; Fortuna Düsseldorf II; Bayern Alzenau; Schott Mainz; TSG Balingen; Bahlinger SC; Viktoria Aschaffenburg; SpVgg Hankofen-Hailing

The 2025–26 Regionalliga was the 18th season of the Regionalliga, the 14th under the current format, as the fourth tier of the German football league system.

== Format ==
According to the promotion rules decided upon in 2019, the Regionalliga Südwest and West received a direct promotion spot. Based on a rotation principle, the Regionalliga Nord received the third direct promotion spot this season, while the Regionalliga Nordost and Bayern champions played a promotion play-off.

== Regionalliga Nord ==
18 teams from the states of Bremen, Hamburg, Lower Saxony and Schleswig-Holstein competed in the 14th season of the reformed Regionalliga Nord. Hannover 96 II was relegated from the 2024–25 3. Liga. HSC Hannover and FSV Schöningen were promoted from the 2024–25 Oberliga Niedersachsen and Altona 93 from the 2024–25 Oberliga Hamburg.

Pos	Team	Pld	W	D	L	GF	GA	GD	Pts	Promotion or relegation
1	SV Meppen (C, P)	34	26	5	3	103	35	+68	83	Promotion to 3. Liga
2	SV Drochtersen/Assel	34	22	4	8	83	48	+35	70	
3	VfB Oldenburg	34	21	6	7	87	45	+42	69	
4	SSV Jeddeloh	34	19	7	8	81	50	+31	64	
5	Phönix Lübeck	34	16	8	10	53	43	+10	56	
6	Hannover 96 II	34	16	5	13	63	49	+14	53	
7	Bremer SV	34	14	10	10	52	41	+11	52	
8	Kickers Emden	34	14	9	11	64	54	+10	51	
9	Weiche Flensburg	34	14	7	13	69	63	+6	49	
10	Hamburger SV II	34	13	8	13	57	50	+7	47	
11	VfB Lübeck	34	12	9	13	54	61	−7	45	
12	Werder Bremen II	34	10	10	14	57	71	−14	40	
13	HSC Hannover	34	10	7	17	49	84	−35	37	
14	FSV Schöningen	34	10	4	20	56	84	−28	34	
15	Eintracht Norderstedt	34	7	9	18	51	79	−28	30	
16	FC St. Pauli II	34	4	13	17	38	72	−34	25	
17	Blau-Weiß Lohne (R)	34	5	8	21	38	78	−40	23	Relegation to Oberliga
18	Altona 93 (R)	34	6	5	23	44	92	−48	23	Relegation to Oberliga

Source: kicker.de
Rules for classification: 1) Points; 2) Goal difference; 3) Goals scored
(C) Champions; (P) Promoted; (R) Relegated

=== Results table ===
Home \ Away	ALT	BSV	BRE	DRO	EMD	FLE	HAM	HAN	HSC	JED	LOH	PHÖ	LÜB	MEP	NOR	OLD	SCH	STP
Altona 93	—	1–1	1–1	0–1	1–3	2–0	0–2	2–4	3–0	2–7	3–2	0–2	2–3	4–4	2–1	0–4	0–4	1–1
Bremer SV	1–0	—	0–3	2–3	4–0	2–2	3–0	2–1	4–1	0–0	2–1	1–1	2–3	0–1	2–0	2–2	3–3	1–0
Werder Bremen II	5–1	1–2	—	1–0	1–1	1–5	1–1	1–3	0–0	4–0	6–2	2–2	4–0	0–6	2–2	1–1	1–3	2–1
SV Drochtersen/Assel	3–1	2–1	3–2	—	3–1	3–1	0–2	4–0	3–1	3–1	4–1	4–0	7–2	1–2	5–1	1–3	1–0	2–1
Kickers Emden	5–1	3–0	4–0	2–2	—	3–2	3–4	0–1	1–1	1–3	2–0	1–3	1–1	0–1	4–2	4–2	1–2	0–1
Weiche Flensburg	4–1	0–0	4–1	3–2	0–1	—	3–2	1–4	4–0	0–4	1–3	2–5	2–2	5–3	2–2	2–3	2–0	1–1
Hamburger SV II	4–0	1–1	6–2	3–0	0–2	2–2	—	0–0	5–1	1–2	5–1	0–1	2–2	0–4	2–2	0–4	2–2	4–1
Hannover 96 II	4–1	2–1	5–1	1–2	2–3	3–2	0–1	—	1–3	1–1	2–0	0–2	2–0	2–2	1–1	3–2	3–0	1–3
HSC Hannover	1–0	0–2	2–2	2–2	3–3	1–3	4–1	2–0	—	1–4	1–3	0–0	1–0	0–5	3–2	0–3	1–3	0–2
SSV Jeddeloh	3–2	1–0	4–1	2–2	3–4	5–1	1–0	0–4	4–0	—	2–1	1–1	3–2	2–3	2–2	0–1	3–0	7–1
Blau-Weiß Lohne	1–1	0–1	0–0	3–4	1–1	0–3	0–1	2–1	2–3	0–2	—	2–1	1–2	0–4	3–3	0–3	4–4	1–0
Phönix Lübeck	2–1	1–0	2–0	0–2	2–0	0–0	1–0	0–2	2–2	3–2	5–0	—	2–0	0–4	0–2	1–2	2–0	3–0
VfB Lübeck	1–2	2–0	1–1	1–1	2–2	0–1	0–2	1–0	1–2	1–1	2–0	3–1	—	1–5	3–1	3–1	4–1	1–1
SV Meppen	6–1	2–3	2–1	3–2	2–2	2–1	2–0	2–2	6–0	4–0	4–0	2–0	3–1	—	4–1	0–1	5–1	4–2
Eintracht Norderstedt	1–0	0–3	2–2	2–0	0–2	0–3	1–2	0–4	3–6	0–1	2–1	1–1	2–4	1–2	—	1–3	3–1	3–2
VfB Oldenburg	6–2	2–2	3–1	3–4	2–1	1–2	0–0	4–2	6–1	1–3	1–1	3–1	4–0	0–2	3–1	—	5–2	4–1
FSV Schöningen	3–2	1–3	0–2	0–2	1–2	3–2	2–1	3–1	1–4	2–6	1–1	3–5	0–4	0–1	2–4	0–3	—	3–1
FC St. Pauli II	2–4	1–1	2–3	0–5	1–1	1–3	1–1	0–1	3–2	1–1	1–1	1–1	1–1	1–1	2–2	1–1	0–5	—

Source: kicker.de
Legend: Blue = home team win; Yellow = draw; Red = away team win.
For upcoming matches, an "a" indicates there is an article about the rivalry between the two participants.

=== Top scorers ===
Rank	Player	Club	Goals
1	(Germany) Julian Ulbricht	SV Meppen	27
2	(Germany) Mats Facklam	VfB Oldenburg	25
3	(Germany) Maurice Boakye	Hamburger SV II	23
4	(Germany) Leon Gino Schmidt	Bremer SV	22
5	(Germany) Philipp Harant	FSV Schöningen	17

== Regionalliga Nordost ==
18 teams from the states of Berlin, Brandenburg, Mecklenburg-Vorpommern, Saxony, Saxony-Anhalt and Thuringia competed in the 14th season of the reformed Regionalliga Nordost. BFC Preussen was promoted from the 2024–25 NOFV-Oberliga Nord and 1. FC Magdeburg II from the 2024–25 NOFV-Oberliga Süd.

Pos	Team	Pld	W	D	L	GF	GA	GD	Pts	Qualification or relegation
1	Lokomotive Leipzig (C)	34	23	3	8	65	30	+35	72	Qualification for promotion play-offs
2	Carl Zeiss Jena	34	22	6	6	65	35	+30	72	
3	FSV Zwickau	34	19	7	8	52	44	+8	64	
4	Hallescher FC	34	19	6	9	63	36	+27	63	
5	Rot-Weiß Erfurt	34	17	10	7	68	47	+21	61	
6	VSG Altglienicke	34	14	11	9	50	40	+10	53	
7	Chemnitzer FC	34	14	9	11	56	52	+4	51	
8	BFC Preussen	34	14	8	12	50	55	−5	50	
9	1. FC Magdeburg II	34	15	4	15	61	55	+6	49	
10	FSV Luckenwalde	34	11	10	13	36	45	−9	43	
11	SV Babelsberg	34	11	8	15	67	65	+2	41	
12	BFC Dynamo	34	10	10	14	45	50	−5	40	
13	Chemie Leipzig	34	12	4	18	43	49	−6	40	
14	Hertha BSC II	34	11	7	16	46	60	−14	40	
15	Greifswalder FC	34	9	11	14	40	45	−5	38	
16	ZFC Meuselwitz (R)	34	8	9	17	44	61	−17	33	Relegation to NOFV-Oberliga
17	FC Eilenburg (R)	34	4	11	19	35	68	−33	23	Relegation to NOFV-Oberliga
18	Hertha Zehlendorf (R)	34	2	8	24	30	79	−49	14	Relegation to NOFV-Oberliga

Source: kicker.de
Rules for classification: 1) Points; 2) Goal difference; 3) Goals scored
(C) Champions; (R) Relegated

=== Results table ===
Home \ Away	ALT	BAB	DYN	BSC	PRE	CHE	EIL	ERF	GRE	HAL	JEN	LEI	LOK	LUC	MAG	MEU	ZEH	ZWI
VSG Altglienicke	—	1–1	0–0	3–0	1–0	1–2	3–1	1–3	1–2	1–1	2–1	1–1	2–3	0–2	5–1	1–0	2–0	3–0
SV Babelsberg	1–2	—	2–2	3–1	2–5	0–1	2–1	0–2	3–1	4–1	1–4	5–0	1–2	2–3	1–3	2–3	4–0	0–2
BFC Dynamo	1–1	0–4	—	1–3	3–1	2–2	2–1	2–3	2–0	1–1	2–3	2–0	0–1	0–1	1–2	1–1	5–1	1–0
Hertha BSC II	1–1	0–2	2–2	—	5–0	2–0	5–2	0–0	0–1	1–0	2–3	0–1	2–7	0–1	2–1	2–3	3–1	3–3
BFC Preussen	1–1	3–6	1–2	0–0	—	2–1	2–2	2–4	0–0	1–3	0–2	2–1	2–0	3–1	1–0	2–1	3–2	3–2
Chemnitzer FC	2–2	5–1	1–1	0–1	1–1	—	2–2	0–4	1–0	3–0	4–1	1–0	3–0	3–3	2–4	3–2	2–1	3–2
FC Eilenburg	0–2	0–2	2–2	0–1	1–0	1–1	—	1–1	0–6	0–5	2–1	0–1	0–1	0–2	0–1	5–1	1–1	3–0
Rot-Weiß Erfurt	1–1	4–2	1–0	3–2	0–1	2–2	3–3	—	3–2	1–2	3–1	2–2	0–2	2–1	3–1	3–3	5–2	2–2
Greifswalder FC	1–0	0–0	0–1	1–1	1–1	0–0	2–1	1–2	—	0–2	3–3	3–0	1–1	0–2	1–3	2–0	1–1	1–2
Hallescher FC	2–3	2–2	1–0	2–0	0–1	3–1	3–0	1–0	2–0	—	0–2	0–0	2–4	3–1	3–1	1–0	5–1	3–0
Carl Zeiss Jena	0–0	1–1	2–1	1–0	3–1	2–0	2–0	2–0	2–1	1–1	—	2–1	1–0	1–0	2–1	1–2	4–0	5–1
Chemie Leipzig	3–0	2–3	2–0	3–1	2–2	2–1	3–2	0–1	2–3	0–2	0–2	—	1–0	1–0	0–2	0–2	4–2	1–2
Lokomotive Leipzig	1–0	1–0	3–0	4–0	1–3	2–1	3–0	2–1	3–0	0–0	1–2	2–0	—	4–0	5–2	1–0	0–2	0–2
FSV Luckenwalde	1–3	0–0	0–1	0–1	3–0	2–1	1–1	1–1	1–1	1–4	1–1	1–0	0–3	—	0–0	2–2	1–0	0–1
1. FC Magdeburg II	0–1	6–4	4–3	6–0	1–1	0–1	4–0	2–3	1–1	0–1	4–1	2–1	1–5	1–2	—	2–1	1–0	1–2
ZFC Meuselwitz	4–0	1–1	0–1	1–3	2–3	1–4	1–1	0–3	1–1	3–2	0–3	0–4	0–1	1–1	1–1	—	2–1	4–0
Hertha Zehlendorf	1–3	3–3	2–1	2–2	0–2	1–2	0–0	1–1	2–3	1–4	0–3	0–5	0–1	1–1	0–2	1–1	—	0–1
FSV Zwickau	2–2	3–2	2–2	2–0	1–0	4–0	2–2	2–1	1–0	2–1	0–0	1–0	1–1	3–0	1–0	2–0	1–0	—

Source: kicker.de
Legend: Blue = home team win; Yellow = draw; Red = away team win.
For upcoming matches, an "a" indicates there is an article about the rivalry between the two participants.

=== Top scorers ===
Rank	Player	Club	Goals
1	(Germany) Jonas Nietfeld	VSG Altglienicke	19
2	(Nigeria) Obed Chidindu Ugondu	Rot-Weiß Erfurt	18
3	(Germany) Ayodele Adetula	Lokomotive Leipzig	17
3	(Mozambique) Stanley Ratifo	Chemie Leipzig	17
5	(Germany) Dejan Božić	Chemnitzer FC	15
5	(Germany) Florian Hansch	ZFC Meuselwitz	15

== Regionalliga West ==
18 teams from North Rhine-Westphalia competed in the 14th season of the reformed Regionalliga West. Borussia Dortmund II was relegated from the 2024–25 3. Liga. Bonner SC was promoted from the 2024–25 Mittelrheinliga, SSVg Velbert from the 2024–25 Oberliga Niederrhein, and Sportfreunde Siegen and VfL Bochum II from the 2024–25 Oberliga Westfalen.

Pos	Team	Pld	W	D	L	GF	GA	GD	Pts	Promotion or relegation
1	Fortuna Köln (C, P)	34	20	10	4	71	30	+41	70	Promotion to 3. Liga
2	Rot-Weiß Oberhausen	34	19	9	6	60	40	+20	66	
3	Schalke 04 II	34	18	7	9	77	50	+27	61	
4	FC Gütersloh	34	16	11	7	55	40	+15	59	
5	Borussia Dortmund II	34	16	10	8	66	50	+16	58	
6	Borussia Mönchengladbach II	34	17	7	10	61	46	+15	58	
7	Sportfreunde Siegen	34	14	12	8	62	43	+19	54	
8	SC Paderborn II	34	12	10	12	52	38	+14	46	
9	Bonner SC	34	12	10	12	38	42	−4	46	
10	1. FC Köln II	34	13	6	15	55	63	−8	45	
11	Sportfreunde Lotte	34	11	12	11	45	55	−10	45	
12	1. FC Bocholt	34	10	9	15	49	57	−8	39	
13	VfL Bochum II	34	9	12	13	48	62	−14	38 (Note: The match between Bonner SC and VfL Bochum II was counted as a 2–2 draw for Bonn (the match's original outcome) and as a 0–2 loss for Bochum due to Bochum fielding an ineligible player.)	
14	SV Rödinghausen	34	7	8	19	46	63	−17	29	
15	SC Wiedenbrück	34	7	8	19	39	65	−26	29	
16	Wuppertaler SV (R)	34	5	11	18	36	70	−34	26	Relegation to Oberliga
17	SSVg Velbert (R)	34	6	7	21	35	72	−37	25	Relegation to Oberliga
18	Fortuna Düsseldorf II (Note: As Fortuna Düsseldorf's senior team was relegated from the 2. Bundesliga, their reserve team was moved to the end of the table and automatically relegated to the Oberliga based on the DFB statutes, sparing SC Wiedenbrück from relegation.) (R)	34	11	7	16	47	58	−11	40	Relegation to Oberliga

Source: kicker.de
Rules for classification: 1) Points; 2) Goal difference; 3) Goals scored
(C) Champions; (P) Promoted; (R) Relegated

=== Results table ===
Home \ Away	BOC	VFL	BON	DOR	DÜS	GÜT	KÖL	FOR	LOT	MÖN	OBE	PAD	RÖD	SCH	SIE	VEL	WIE	WUP
1. FC Bocholt	—	3–1	1–2	1–1	0–3	0–0	3–0	2–3	4–1	0–2	2–2	0–0	0–4	2–3	0–2	2–1	4–0	1–3
VfL Bochum II	3–2	—	1–4	1–2	2–2	1–1	0–1	0–1	1–2	1–1	2–5	2–2	2–0	1–4	0–0	2–2	3–1	4–1
Bonner SC	1–1	2–2 (Note: The match was counted as a 0–2 loss for Bochum due to them fielding an ineligible player.)	—	0–1	1–0	2–3	1–0	0–3	1–2	0–4	1–1	1–1	1–0	0–1	1–1	0–1	2–1	1–1
Borussia Dortmund II	1–2	4–1	1–1	—	4–1	2–1	1–1	1–0	1–1	1–2	1–2	1–0	3–2	4–1	2–2	5–0	2–2	2–2
Fortuna Düsseldorf II	2–2	0–2	2–0	0–2	—	0–2	3–3	0–2	2–3	1–3	1–0	0–2	3–1	0–0	0–0	2–1	3–0	2–2
FC Gütersloh	6–3	6–0	2–1	1–1	1–3	—	2–1	1–1	3–0	2–1	0–0	1–1	2–0	1–3	3–2	0–1	1–0	0–0
1. FC Köln II	3–2	1–3	0–1	3–5	0–2	0–0	—	3–0	1–1	2–1	1–2	1–0	2–1	1–5	2–4	4–1	3–0	3–2
Fortuna Köln	1–1	0–0	0–0	2–2	3–2	3–0	3–2	—	4–0	2–1	5–1	0–0	1–1	4–1	2–1	5–0	2–0	3–0
Sportfreunde Lotte	1–1	2–2	1–0	3–5	1–0	2–2	2–1	2–2	—	0–1	0–1	1–1	3–0	2–5	2–1	2–2	0–0	1–2
Borussia Mönchengladbach II	3–0	4–1	1–2	2–1	1–1	2–4	0–2	3–2	3–1	—	0–6	2–0	1–1	2–4	3–3	0–1	1–1	2–1
Rot-Weiß Oberhausen	3–2	1–0	3–1	2–1	2–0	0–2	1–2	1–3	1–1	1–0	—	1–0	2–2	2–2	3–1	0–0	2–1	2–2
SC Paderborn II	0–0	0–2	1–3	3–0	1–2	0–2	5–0	2–1	3–1	1–1	3–0	—	2–0	1–1	0–2	3–2	4–0	6–1
SV Rödinghausen	3–1	0–2	1–0	2–4	3–0	0–1	2–3	0–4	1–2	0–3	1–1	2–1	—	3–3	3–4	1–1	0–1	0–0
Schalke 04 II	1–0	3–2	2–3	4–0	3–1	3–0	2–3	0–0	3–0	1–2	0–2	1–1	3–2	—	0–2	1–3	5–0	5–1
Sportfreunde Siegen	0–1	1–1	1–2	0–1	3–1	5–0	2–1	2–2	0–0	2–2	0–1	2–1	3–0	2–2	—	3–1	3–1	2–0
SSVg Velbert	1–2	2–3	0–0	1–2	1–2	0–3	3–3	0–2	0–3	1–2	0–4	1–3	2–3	1–3	2–2	—	2–1	0–3
SC Wiedenbrück	0–2	0–0	2–2	2–0	5–2	1–1	2–2	1–3	1–2	0–2	1–2	3–1	2–2	2–1	2–3	1–0	—	4–0
Wuppertaler SV	0–2	2–2	0–1	2–2	2–4	1–1	1–0	0–2	0–0	0–3	2–3	1–3	0–5	0–1	1–1	0–1	3–1	—

Source: kicker.de
Legend: Blue = home team win; Yellow = draw; Red = away team win.
For upcoming matches, an "a" indicates there is an article about the rivalry between the two participants.

=== Top scorers ===
Rank	Player	Club	Goals
1	(Germany) Eduard Probst	SV Rödinghausen	19
2	(France) Yassin Ben Balla	Schalke 04 II	15
2	(Germany) Leon Demaj	Sportfreunde Lotte	15
4	(Germany) Deniz Bindemann	Fortuna Düsseldorf II	14
4	(Czech Republic) Patrik Twardzik	FC Gütersloh	14
4	(Germany) Jan Urbich	Borussia Mönchengladbach II	14
4	(Germany) Enzo Wirtz	Fortuna Köln	14

== Regionalliga Südwest ==
18 teams from Baden-Württemberg, Hesse, Rhineland-Palatinate and Saarland competed in the 14th season of the Regionalliga Südwest. SV Sandhausen was relegated from the 2024–25 3. Liga. Schott Mainz was promoted from the 2024–25 Oberliga Rheinland-Pfalz/Saar, Sonnenhof Großaspach and TSG Balingen from the 2024–25 Oberliga Baden-Württemberg, and Bayern Alzenau from the 2024–25 Hessenliga.

Pos	Team	Pld	W	D	L	GF	GA	GD	Pts	Promotion or relegation
1	Sonnenhof Großaspach (C, P)	34	20	8	6	86	43	+43	68	Promotion to 3. Liga
2	SGV Freiberg	34	18	8	8	68	38	+30	62	
3	FSV Frankfurt	34	16	9	9	64	48	+16	57	
4	FC 08 Homburg	34	15	11	8	71	42	+29	56	
5	TSV Steinbach Haiger	34	16	8	10	78	58	+20	56	
6	Hessen Kassel	34	15	9	10	62	51	+11	54	
7	Stuttgarter Kickers	34	17	3	14	51	44	+7	54	
8	SV Sandhausen	34	16	6	12	53	56	−3	54	
9	Mainz 05 II	34	14	11	9	52	45	+7	53	
10	Barockstadt Fulda-Lehnerz	34	13	10	11	51	44	+7	49	
11	SC Freiburg II	34	14	6	14	74	73	+1	48	
12	Astoria Walldorf	34	13	8	13	64	65	−1	47	
13	Eintracht Trier	34	13	8	13	48	52	−4	47	
14	Kickers Offenbach	34	11	10	13	57	58	−1	43	
15	Bayern Alzenau (R)	34	7	6	21	45	74	−29	27	Relegation to Oberliga
16	Schott Mainz (R)	34	7	4	23	40	83	−43	25	Relegation to Oberliga
17	TSG Balingen (R)	34	6	7	21	38	87	−49	25	Relegation to Oberliga
18	Bahlinger SC (Note: Bahlinger SC did not apply for a Regionalliga license.) (R)	34	4	10	20	34	75	−41	22	Relegation to Oberliga

Source: kicker.de
Rules for classification: 1) Points; 2) Goal difference; 3) Goals scored; 4) Head-to-head points; 5) Head-to-head goal difference; 6) Head-to-head goals scored; 7) Head-to-head away goals scored; 8) Away goals scored; 9) Play-off (only when deciding promotion or relegation)
(C) Champions; (P) Promoted; (R) Relegated

=== Results table ===
Home \ Away	ALZ	BAH	BAL	FRA	SGV	FRE	FUL	GRO	HOM	KAS	MAI	SCH	OFF	SAN	STE	STU	TRI	WAL
Bayern Alzenau	—	2–0	0–0	1–3	3–3	2–2	1–4	1–4	1–1	2–2	1–3	0–4	2–0	1–2	3–4	3–0	2–0	2–4
Bahlinger SC	1–2	—	4–3	1–1	2–2	1–2	1–2	0–2	0–2	1–2	1–1	0–0	0–2	1–3	1–2	2–1	2–2	2–2
TSG Balingen	3–1	1–2	—	0–2	0–6	2–3	1–2	0–4	1–4	1–1	1–1	4–1	1–1	1–2	0–3	0–2	0–1	1–4
FSV Frankfurt	4–0	1–1	2–3	—	1–3	1–2	1–1	1–3	1–1	4–2	1–1	2–2	1–2	1–0	0–6	3–0	2–0	2–2
SGV Freiberg	0–0	5–0	1–0	3–1	—	3–0	1–1	1–1	1–2	3–2	1–2	4–0	2–0	1–2	1–3	2–1	1–0	2–0
SC Freiburg II	1–3	4–0	4–4	2–4	1–2	—	2–1	2–4	5–3	1–3	2–1	3–3	1–3	2–2	3–2	1–3	4–1	6–0
Barockstadt Fulda-Lehnerz	3–1	3–0	1–2	1–2	0–2	2–1	—	1–2	3–3	2–1	2–1	0–2	1–0	1–1	1–1	0–1	1–0	1–1
Sonnenhof Großaspach	3–2	4–0	6–1	2–3	4–0	2–1	0–2	—	1–2	1–0	2–2	2–1	3–3	2–3	4–1	3–1	2–2	6–0
FC 08 Homburg	5–2	6–0	4–0	3–1	2–1	4–1	1–1	1–1	—	1–1	0–1	2–0	1–1	0–1	1–1	2–1	1–2	1–3
Hessen Kassel	3–2	2–2	2–2	0–1	1–1	2–3	2–1	2–2	0–0	—	3–0	2–1	1–1	2–3	2–0	3–0	3–2	1–3
Mainz 05 II	2–0	1–1	2–0	0–1	2–1	0–4	2–2	0–0	2–2	2–1	—	0–3	3–1	1–3	3–1	3–0	3–2	0–0
Schott Mainz	1–0	1–3	2–3	0–5	0–1	0–3	2–4	1–4	0–7	1–2	1–2	—	1–3	0–2	1–4	3–1	1–1	4–2
Kickers Offenbach	1–0	1–0	5–0	3–3	2–5	1–1	1–1	1–3	2–2	1–3	3–1	3–1	—	2–0	1–3	0–0	1–2	1–1
SV Sandhausen	1–0	1–1	1–2	1–2	1–0	2–2	1–0	1–3	1–3	3–2	2–2	0–1	4–3	—	1–5	2–1	0–0	1–2
TSV Steinbach Haiger	4–2	4–2	0–0	0–3	1–1	3–1	2–1	2–2	1–4	1–2	1–1	6–0	4–2	2–3	—	0–1	3–2	4–2
Stuttgarter Kickers	3–0	3–0	4–1	0–3	1–1	4–0	0–1	2–0	2–0	0–1	1–0	2–1	1–2	3–2	4–1	—	1–1	2–1
Eintracht Trier	3–0	2–1	3–0	1–1	1–4	3–1	3–2	2–0	2–0	0–2	0–5	2–0	2–1	3–1	1–1	2–4	—	0–0
Astoria Walldorf	0–3	3–1	6–0	1–0	1–3	2–3	2–2	1–4	1–0	3–4	1–2	4–1	4–3	4–0	2–2	0–1	2–0	—

Source: kicker.de
Legend: Blue = home team win; Yellow = draw; Red = away team win.
For upcoming matches, an "a" indicates there is an article about the rivalry between the two participants.

=== Top scorers ===
Rank	Player	Club	Goals
1	(Germany) Fabian Eisele	Sonnenhof Großaspach	22
2	(Germany) Pascal Testroet	SV Sandhausen	21
3	(Germany) Yasin Zor	Astoria Walldorf	15
4	(France) David Amegnaglo	SC Freiburg II	13
4	(Germany) Flamur Berisha	Stuttgarter Kickers	13
4	(Germany) Ismail Harnafi	FSV Frankfurt	13
4	(Germany) Michael Kleinschrodt	Sonnenhof Großaspach	13
4	(Germany) David Tomić	Stuttgarter Kickers	13

== Regionalliga Bayern ==
18 teams from Bavaria competed in the 14th season of the Regionalliga Bayern. SpVgg Unterhaching was relegated from the 2024–25 3. Liga. VfB Eichstätt was promoted from the 2024–25 Bayernliga Nord and FC Memmingen from the 2024–25 Bayernliga Süd.

Pos	Team	Pld	W	D	L	GF	GA	GD	Pts	Qualification or relegation
1	1. FC Nürnberg II (Note: 1. FC Nürnberg II did not apply for a 3. Liga license and were ineligible for qualification for the DFB-Pokal as a reserve team.) (C)	34	24	5	5	68	35	+33	77	
2	Würzburger Kickers (O, P)	34	22	9	3	74	25	+49	75	Qualification for promotion play-offs and DFB-Pokal
3	SpVgg Unterhaching	34	22	4	8	72	30	+42	70	
4	FV Illertissen	34	19	7	8	72	46	+26	64	
5	DJK Vilzing	34	15	6	13	49	44	+5	51	
6	TSV Aubstadt	34	13	10	11	49	45	+4	49	
7	VfB Eichstätt	34	12	12	10	48	37	+11	48	
8	Bayern Munich II (Note: Reserve teams are ineligible for qualification for the DFB-Pokal.)	34	14	6	14	61	52	+9	47 (Note: Bayern Munich II were deducted one point for a pyrotechnic incident against Wacker Burghausen on 5 December 2025.)	
9	Wacker Burghausen	34	13	8	13	46	50	−4	47	
10	SpVgg Ansbach	34	13	7	14	54	65	−11	46	
11	TSV Buchbach	34	13	7	14	54	69	−15	46	
12	FC Memmingen	34	10	12	12	43	47	−4	42	
13	SpVgg Bayreuth	34	9	11	14	36	53	−17	38	
14	FC Augsburg II	34	9	7	18	37	48	−11	34	
15	Schwaben Augsburg (O)	34	9	7	18	39	60	−21	34	Qualification for relegation play-offs
16	Greuther Fürth II (O)	34	6	10	18	47	60	−13	28	Qualification for relegation play-offs
17	Viktoria Aschaffenburg (R)	34	6	8	20	31	71	−40	26	Relegation to Bayernliga
18	SpVgg Hankofen-Hailing (R)	34	5	8	21	31	74	−43	23	Relegation to Bayernliga

Source: kicker.de
Rules for classification: 1) Points; 2) Goal difference; 3) Goals scored
(C) Champions; (O) Play-off winners; (P) Promoted; (R) Relegated

=== Results table ===
Home \ Away	ANS	ASC	AUB	FCA	AUG	BAY	BUC	BUR	EIC	FÜR	HAN	ILL	MEM	MUN	NÜR	UNT	VIL	WÜR
SpVgg Ansbach	—	3–0	2–2	3–2	0–2	1–2	3–1	3–1	1–1	3–1	1–0	1–3	1–3	1–1	2–0	1–0	0–3	1–4
Viktoria Aschaffenburg	0–1	—	1–1	3–2	1–2	0–1	0–1	2–2	3–3	0–4	0–1	1–1	0–3	0–4	0–1	0–3	3–2	0–1
TSV Aubstadt	2–1	0–0	—	2–0	1–1	4–0	4–1	0–1	1–0	1–0	1–1	3–5	0–0	1–3	0–1	1–1	1–2	1–0
FC Augsburg II	0–0	0–1	3–3	—	2–1	3–1	0–3	0–0	1–3	1–0	1–1	0–1	0–1	1–2	0–1	2–3	1–1	0–1
Schwaben Augsburg	1–3	0–1	3–1	0–1	—	2–2	2–2	1–0	1–4	4–2	2–2	2–2	1–3	2–1	0–2	0–3	1–2	0–2
SpVgg Bayreuth	2–3	0–0	2–4	1–0	2–0	—	2–0	0–2	0–2	0–3	2–0	1–5	3–1	2–1	0–0	2–3	3–0	0–0
TSV Buchbach	3–1	6–3	2–4	0–4	1–0	1–1	—	3–1	3–2	0–0	3–0	0–3	3–2	3–4	1–2	1–1	1–4	1–1
Wacker Burghausen	3–0	5–2	1–1	3–0	2–1	1–1	0–0	—	2–1	1–3	0–0	4–1	2–0	1–0	3–4	1–3	2–1	1–1
VfB Eichstätt	2–2	1–1	1–1	2–2	0–1	1–1	0–1	2–1	—	2–1	2–0	2–0	1–2	3–0	2–2	1–1	2–0	1–1
Greuther Fürth II	2–2	4–1	1–2	0–1	1–1	3–0	1–2	1–1	0–1	—	2–2	1–2	2–1	1–1	1–2	1–2	2–2	1–5
SpVgg Hankofen-Hailing	3–6	1–0	1–2	2–0	0–3	2–0	1–4	0–1	2–3	1–1	—	1–5	0–4	1–0	2–3	1–6	2–3	1–3
FV Illertissen	4–1	0–2	1–0	0–3	2–1	4–0	4–1	3–1	1–1	2–1	2–0	—	2–2	4–0	1–1	1–2	0–0	0–3
FC Memmingen	2–2	0–0	2–1	1–1	0–1	1–1	1–1	0–1	0–1	1–1	1–1	3–2	—	1–4	0–2	2–1	1–1	1–5
Bayern Munich II	1–2	5–1	1–0	2–0	5–0	2–2	6–3	3–0	1–1	1–1	2–0	3–4	2–2	—	0–3	1–0	1–0	1–3
1. FC Nürnberg II	3–1	5–2	4–0	2–1	1–0	2–0	8–1	2–1	1–0	2–0	2–2	2–5	2–0	4–1	—	0–2	1–3	1–0
SpVgg Unterhaching	3–0	2–1	0–1	1–0	5–0	1–1	0–1	4–0	1–0	5–2	3–0	2–0	1–2	2–0	3–0	—	5–0	0–2
DJK Vilzing	4–1	1–2	2–4	0–1	1–0	1–0	3–0	3–0	1–0	5–2	1–0	0–1	0–0	1–0	0–1	1–3	—	1–1
Würzburger Kickers	4–1	4–0	1–0	3–4	3–3	1–1	1–0	4–1	1–0	3–1	5–0	1–1	1–0	2–1	1–1	4–0	2–0	—

Source: kicker.de
Legend: Blue = home team win; Yellow = draw; Red = away team win.
For upcoming matches, an "a" indicates there is an article about the rivalry between the two participants.

=== Top scorers ===
Rank	Player	Club	Goals
1	(Germany) Anton Heinz	Bayern Munich II	21
2	(Germany) Tarsis Bonga	Würzburger Kickers	15
2	(Germany) Jermain Nischalke	Würzburger Kickers	15
2	(Germany) Severo Sturm	TSV Aubstadt	15
5	(Germany) Yannick Glessing	FV Illertissen	14
5	(Germany) Simon Skarlatidis	SpVgg Unterhaching	14

=== Relegation play-offs ===
Team 1	Agg.	Team 2	1st leg	2nd leg
SV Kirchanschöring	3–5	Schwaben Augsburg	2–3	1–2
ASV Cham	1–4	Greuther Fürth II	1–3	0–1

== Promotion play-offs ==
The matches were scheduled to be played on 27 and 31 May 2026 due to Würzburger Kickers qualifying for the 2025–26 Bavarian Cup final on 23 May. They were later moved back by one day each after Lokomotive Leipzig qualified due to a scheduling conflict with the 2026 UEFA Conference League final also taking place in Leipzig.

Team 1	Agg.	Team 2	1st leg	2nd leg
Lokomotive Leipzig	1–3	Würzburger Kickers	0–1	1–2

All times Central European Summer Time (UTC+2)

28 May 2026
19:00

Lokomotive Leipzig	0–1	Würzburger Kickers
	Report	Omore 50'

Bruno-Plache-Stadion, Leipzig
Attendance: 10,787
Referee: Lars Erbst
1 June 2026
18:30

Würzburger Kickers	2–1	Lokomotive Leipzig
Nischalke 30'; Cisse 72'	Report	Ziane 71'

Akon Arena, Würzburg
Attendance: 10,717
Referee: Jarno Wienefeld

Würzburger Kickers won 3–1 on aggregate and was promoted to the 2026–27 3. Liga.
