= 2024–25 Regionalliga =

17th season of the Regionalliga

Regionalliga
- Season: 2024–25
- Champions: TSV Havelse (Nord); Lokomotive Leipzig (Nordost); MSV Duisburg (West); TSG Hoffenheim II (Südwest); 1. FC Schweinfurt (Bayern)
- Promoted: TSV Havelse; MSV Duisburg; TSG Hoffenheim II; 1. FC Schweinfurt
- Relegated: Teutonia Ottensen; Holstein Kiel II; SV Todesfelde; Viktoria Berlin; VFC Plauen; Eintracht Hohkeppel; 1. FC Düren; Türkspor Dortmund; KFC Uerdingen; FC Gießen; Eintracht Frankfurt II; 1. Göppinger SV; FC 08 Villingen; Eintracht Bamberg; Türkgücü München

The 2024–25 Regionalliga was the 17th season of the Regionalliga, the 13th under the new format, as the fourth tier of the German football league system.

== Format ==
According to the promotion rules decided upon in 2019, the Regionalliga Südwest and West receive a direct promotion spot. Based on a rotation principle, the Regionalliga Bayern receives the third direct promotion spot this season, while the Regionalliga Nord and Nordost champions will play a promotion play-off.

== Regionalliga Nord ==
18 teams from the states of Bremen, Hamburg, Lower Saxony and Schleswig-Holstein competed in the 13th season of the reformed Regionalliga Nord. VfB Lübeck was relegated from the 2023–24 3. Liga. Kickers Emden was promoted from the 2023–24 Oberliga Niedersachsen, Werder Bremen II from the 2023–24 Bremen-Liga and SV Todesfelde from the 2023–24 Oberliga Schleswig-Holstein.

Pos	Team	Pld	W	D	L	GF	GA	GD	Pts	Qualification or relegation
1	TSV Havelse (C, O, P)	34	23	5	6	67	34	+33	74	Qualification for promotion play-offs
2	Kickers Emden	34	19	3	12	65	44	+21	60	
3	SV Drochtersen/Assel	34	17	9	8	45	32	+13	60	
4	Werder Bremen II	34	17	7	10	89	56	+33	58	
5	Phönix Lübeck	34	15	11	8	65	44	+21	56	
6	SV Meppen	34	15	9	10	66	39	+27	54	
7	VfB Lübeck	34	14	12	8	56	50	+6	54	
8	Hamburger SV II	34	14	7	13	59	66	−7	49	
9	Blau-Weiß Lohne	34	12	11	11	55	57	−2	47	
10	FC St. Pauli II	34	13	6	15	52	58	−6	45	
11	VfB Oldenburg	34	11	10	13	51	55	−4	43	
12	Eintracht Norderstedt	34	12	7	15	43	59	−16	43	
13	Weiche Flensburg	34	11	8	15	52	62	−10	41	
14	SSV Jeddeloh	34	9	11	14	46	65	−19	38	
15	Bremer SV	34	11	4	19	60	67	−7	37	
16	Teutonia Ottensen (Note: Teutonia Ottensen withdrew its team from the Regionalliga Nord at the end of the season.) (R)	34	9	6	19	44	78	−34	33	Relegation to Oberliga
17	Holstein Kiel II (R)	34	7	7	20	45	64	−19	28	Relegation to Oberliga
18	SV Todesfelde (R)	34	7	7	20	24	54	−30	28	Relegation to Oberliga

Source: kicker.de
Rules for classification: 1) Points; 2) Goal difference; 3) Goals scored
(C) Champions; (O) Play-off winners; (P) Promoted; (R) Relegated

=== Results table ===
Home \ Away	BSV	BRE	DRO	EMD	FLE	HAM	HAV	JED	KIE	LOH	PHÖ	LÜB	MEP	NOR	OLD	OTT	STP	TOD
Bremer SV	—	1–1	3–2	1–2	2–4	3–0	1–2	2–3	2–0	3–4	3–2	0–1	2–5	0–1	1–2	0–0	2–0	3–0
Werder Bremen II	3–2	—	1–1	3–2	4–1	5–0	0–2	8–1	3–1	3–4	3–1	1–1	4–1	1–1	1–2	2–3	3–1	1–2
SV Drochtersen/Assel	2–0	1–0	—	3–1	3–0	3–1	0–0	0–1	1–1	2–0	2–1	1–1	2–1	2–1	1–1	3–2	1–0	1–1
Kickers Emden	3–1	5–1	0–1	—	4–0	1–3	1–2	3–1	1–3	1–1	0–3	1–3	1–0	3–1	1–1	3–2	0–1	1–0
Weiche Flensburg	3–2	3–3	1–0	1–3	—	1–0	1–2	4–1	2–4	0–3	0–0	1–1	1–4	1–1	2–0	3–0	0–1	5–0
Hamburger SV II	5–3	1–4	1–1	1–2	2–1	—	0–6	2–0	2–1	3–3	1–1	2–3	2–1	2–1	5–0	5–2	4–2	3–0
TSV Havelse	2–0	4–3	2–1	0–1	2–1	6–1	—	2–0	1–0	2–3	3–1	1–1	2–1	2–0	4–1	2–0	3–1	3–0
SSV Jeddeloh	1–2	3–0	1–2	2–7	1–1	2–2	1–3	—	3–1	1–1	1–1	3–2	1–0	1–2	1–2	2–2	1–0	0–0
Holstein Kiel II	1–1	1–3	0–1	1–2	2–2	2–0	0–1	1–1	—	1–1	1–2	1–1	1–2	5–1	2–4	0–1	0–4	1–3
Blau-Weiß Lohne	5–3	1–3	0–0	0–2	3–1	3–2	1–3	0–3	0–1	—	2–0	1–3	0–2	1–1	1–0	1–1	0–0	0–3
Phönix Lübeck	2–1	0–0	1–0	1–1	2–1	1–1	1–1	3–1	4–1	1–3	—	1–1	1–1	0–1	3–1	3–2	2–0	3–1
VfB Lübeck	1–4	1–6	0–1	3–1	1–2	1–0	2–2	2–2	2–2	2–1	2–2	—	1–0	2–3	1–1	1–4	2–0	2–1
SV Meppen	5–0	3–3	0–0	2–0	1–1	5–1	4–0	3–1	3–1	2–2	0–3	3–0	—	1–1	0–2	4–0	2–0	1–1
Eintracht Norderstedt	0–4	3–2	2–0	0–4	1–2	0–1	2–0	1–1	4–2	3–3	3–2	1–2	1–3	—	2–0	1–4	0–3	1–0
VfB Oldenburg	3–0	0–3	2–3	0–3	5–1	0–0	1–1	0–1	0–3	2–4	2–2	0–2	2–2	2–0	—	5–2	4–0	0–0
Teutonia Ottensen	0–3	1–3	2–0	0–2	1–0	1–1	3–0	2–2	3–1	1–1	1–9	0–5	0–3	2–1	1–4	—	1–4	0–1
FC St. Pauli II	1–1	1–5	3–4	1–0	2–2	1–4	1–0	2–2	3–0	2–1	3–5	1–3	2–1	1–1	2–2	1–0	—	4–0
SV Todesfelde	1–4	1–3	1–0	1–3	1–3	0–1	0–1	2–0	0–3	0–1	0–1	0–0	0–0	0–1	0–0	2–0	2–4	—

Source: kicker.de
Legend: Blue = home team win; Yellow = draw; Red = away team win.
For upcoming matches, an "a" indicates there is an article about the rivalry between the two participants.

=== Top scorers ===
Rank	Player	Club	Goals
1	(Germany) Omar Sillah	Hamburger SV II	20
2	(Netherlands) Nikky Goguadze	Bremer SV	18
3	(Poland) Maik Łukowicz	Werder Bremen II	16
3	(Germany) Leon Opitz	Werder Bremen II	16
3	(Germany) Christian Stark	Teutonia Ottensen	16

== Regionalliga Nordost ==
18 teams from the states of Berlin, Brandenburg, Mecklenburg-Vorpommern, Saxony, Saxony-Anhalt and Thuringia competed in the 13th season of the reformed Regionalliga Nordost. Hallescher FC was relegated from the 2023–24 3. Liga. Hertha Zehlendorf was promoted from the 2023–24 NOFV-Oberliga Nord and VFC Plauen from the 2023–24 NOFV-Oberliga Süd.

Pos	Team	Pld	W	D	L	GF	GA	GD	Pts	Qualification or relegation
1	Lokomotive Leipzig (C)	34	23	7	4	65	24	+41	76	Qualification for promotion play-offs
2	Hallescher FC	34	21	7	6	56	28	+28	70	
3	Rot-Weiß Erfurt	34	17	9	8	60	43	+17	60	
4	FSV Zwickau	34	18	6	10	47	46	+1	60	
5	Carl Zeiss Jena	34	17	7	10	71	45	+26	58	
6	Greifswalder FC	34	15	10	9	53	34	+19	55	
7	Chemnitzer FC	34	12	14	8	38	25	+13	50	
8	BFC Dynamo	34	13	10	11	52	45	+7	49	
9	VSG Altglienicke	34	12	11	11	42	35	+7	47	
10	Hertha BSC II	34	14	3	17	55	63	−8	45	
11	ZFC Meuselwitz	34	11	10	13	41	57	−16	43	
12	Hertha Zehlendorf	34	10	8	16	57	61	−4	38	
13	SV Babelsberg	34	9	10	15	46	57	−11	37	
14	Chemie Leipzig	34	8	10	16	33	59	−26	34	
15	FSV Luckenwalde	34	7	11	16	28	45	−17	32	
16	FC Eilenburg	34	7	11	16	44	62	−18	32	
17	Viktoria Berlin (R)	34	8	8	18	35	59	−24	32	Relegation to NOFV-Oberliga
18	VFC Plauen (R)	34	4	8	22	27	62	−35	20	Relegation to NOFV-Oberliga

Source: kicker.de
Rules for classification: 1) Points; 2) Goal difference; 3) Goals scored
(C) Champions; (R) Relegated

=== Results table ===
Home \ Away	ALT	BAB	DYN	BSC	VIK	CHE	EIL	ERF	GRE	HAL	JEN	LEI	LOK	LUC	MEU	PLA	ZEH	ZWI
VSG Altglienicke	—	1–1	1–0	0–2	2–1	0–2	3–1	0–1	2–2	1–2	4–2	2–1	0–1	0–0	0–0	1–0	2–0	3–1
SV Babelsberg	0–0	—	1–1	1–2	3–1	0–0	2–2	0–2	1–2	0–4	1–4	3–1	3–1	1–2	1–1	2–1	2–1	0–2
BFC Dynamo	3–0	3–0	—	3–2	3–0	0–0	1–1	1–1	1–4	1–2	2–3	2–0	0–2	0–0	4–0	3–1	2–0	2–2
Hertha BSC II	2–4	0–4	1–2	—	3–1	0–1	7–1	2–1	0–0	0–1	1–4	1–2	0–6	2–1	4–1	3–1	3–0	3–0
Viktoria Berlin	1–1	4–2	1–1	1–2	—	0–2	0–3	1–1	1–1	1–0	4–2	2–0	0–1	4–1	1–1	2–0	2–1	0–0
Chemnitzer FC	1–0	2–3	2–1	1–1	1–1	—	1–0	2–0	2–2	0–0	1–2	0–1	1–1	2–0	4–0	0–1	0–0	0–1
FC Eilenburg	2–2	3–2	1–2	1–3	0–0	2–2	—	1–2	0–3	2–2	1–1	0–0	0–3	2–0	0–1	4–0	4–3	0–0
Rot-Weiß Erfurt	1–1	1–1	4–1	4–1	3–0	0–0	2–0	—	2–0	0–4	3–1	5–1	2–4	3–2	0–0	1–1	2–0	4–2
Greifswalder FC	2–1	2–1	1–2	0–1	4–1	1–1	4–2	1–2	—	4–0	1–3	0–0	1–1	1–0	3–0	3–0	0–0	2–1
Hallescher FC	1–0	2–0	2–0	4–1	3–0	0–1	2–2	2–0	1–0	—	2–1	3–1	0–1	1–0	2–1	1–1	4–1	2–0
Carl Zeiss Jena	2–2	1–2	1–1	0–2	2–0	1–0	3–0	5–1	1–1	2–0	—	5–0	0–1	2–2	0–1	2–1	6–2	1–2
Chemie Leipzig	0–3	1–1	1–0	2–2	4–0	2–2	2–1	0–3	1–2	1–1	0–3	—	0–3	1–3	1–1	1–1	3–1	0–2
Lokomotive Leipzig	2–0	2–1	4–0	4–1	1–0	0–2	2–0	0–0	0–0	1–1	3–0	2–0	—	1–1	3–1	2–0	2–1	3–2
FSV Luckenwalde	0–0	2–2	0–0	1–0	1–0	0–2	0–2	1–2	2–1	1–1	0–1	0–0	2–2	—	2–2	0–1	0–3	0–1
ZFC Meuselwitz	1–0	2–3	2–2	3–2	2–1	1–0	2–1	1–0	2–1	1–2	0–3	1–3	1–3	0–1	—	2–2	2–2	2–0
VFC Plauen	0–3	0–0	1–3	2–1	2–3	1–1	1–1	1–2	2–0	1–2	1–4	1–2	0–1	0–2	2–3	—	0–1	0–2
Hertha Zehlendorf	0–0	2–1	3–5	4–0	5–1	1–0	1–2	3–3	0–2	1–2	2–2	2–0	2–1	4–1	2–2	1–1	—	5–0
FSV Zwickau	0–3	2–1	1–0	2–0	1–0	2–2	3–2	3–2	0–2	1–0	1–1	1–1	2–1	1–0	2–1	3–0	4–3	—

Source: kicker.de
Legend: Blue = home team win; Yellow = draw; Red = away team win.
For upcoming matches, an "a" indicates there is an article about the rivalry between the two participants.

=== Top scorers ===
Rank	Player	Club	Goals
1	(Germany) Erik Weinhauer	Carl Zeiss Jena	18
2	(Germany) Soufian Benyamina	Greifswalder FC	17
3	(Germany) Daniel Frahn	SV Babelsberg	16
3	(Germany) Stefan Maderer	Lokomotive Leipzig	16
5	(Azerbaijan) Rufat Dadashov	BFC Dynamo	14

== Regionalliga West ==
18 teams from North Rhine-Westphalia competed in the 13th season of the reformed Regionalliga West. MSV Duisburg was relegated from the 2023–24 3. Liga. Eintracht Hohkeppel was promoted from the 2023–24 Mittelrheinliga, KFC Uerdingen from the 2023–24 Oberliga Niederrhein, and Sportfreunde Lotte and Türkspor Dortmund were promoted from the 2023–24 Oberliga Westfalen.

The best-placed Westphalian non-reserve team will qualify for the 2025–26 DFB-Pokal.

Pos	Team	Pld	W	D	L	GF	GA	GD	Pts	Promotion, qualification or relegation
1	MSV Duisburg (C, P)	30	21	6	3	60	22	+38	69	Promotion to 3. Liga
2	FC Gütersloh	30	18	4	8	68	40	+28	58	Qualification for DFB-Pokal
3	Sportfreunde Lotte	30	15	7	8	60	45	+15	52	
4	Rot-Weiß Oberhausen	30	15	5	10	55	42	+13	50	
5	SV Rödinghausen	30	14	8	8	47	36	+11	50	
6	Fortuna Köln	30	13	9	8	47	38	+9	48	
7	Borussia Mönchengladbach II	30	13	7	10	46	45	+1	46	
8	1. FC Köln II	30	12	7	11	48	39	+9	43	
9	SC Paderborn II	30	10	7	13	47	46	+1	37	
10	1. FC Bocholt	30	8	10	12	56	58	−2	34	
11	Fortuna Düsseldorf II	30	8	9	13	34	39	−5	33	
12	SC Wiedenbrück	30	10	3	17	38	53	−15	33	
13	Wuppertaler SV	30	8	7	15	30	54	−24	31	
14	Schalke 04 II	30	7	6	17	32	50	−18	27	
15	Eintracht Hohkeppel (R)	30	6	7	17	38	65	−27	25	Relegation to Oberliga
16	1. FC Düren (Note: 1. FC Düren did not apply for a Regionalliga license and was automatically relegated.) (R)	30	7	8	15	26	60	−34	20 (Note: 1. FC Düren was deducted 9 points for filing for insolvency.)	Relegation to Oberliga
17	Türkspor Dortmund (Note: Türkspor Dortmund withdrew from the Regionalliga West on 12 March 2025. Subsequently, all their results were expunged. At the time of their withdrawal, they were in 18th place with 1 win, 6 draws and 17 losses (9 points) and a goal difference of 23–75 (−52).) (R)	0	0	0	0	0	0	0	0	Relegation to Oberliga
17	KFC Uerdingen (Note: KFC Uerdingen withdrew from the Regionalliga West on 22 April 2025. Subsequently, all their results were expunged. At the time of their withdrawal, they were in 15th place with 6 wins, 7 draws and 15 losses (25 points) and a goal difference of 30–52 (−22).) (R)	0	0	0	0	0	0	0	0	Relegation to Oberliga

Source: kicker.de
Rules for classification: 1) Points; 2) Goal difference; 3) Goals scored
(C) Champions; (P) Promoted; (R) Relegated

=== Results table ===
Home \ Away	BOC	DUI	DÜR	DÜS	GÜT	HOH	KÖL	FOR	LOT	MÖN	OBE	PAD	RÖD	SCH	WIE	WUP
1. FC Bocholt	—	2–4	1–1	1–1	0–1	3–1	1–0	3–5	3–4	2–4	1–1	1–2	0–2	3–1	3–3	1–1
MSV Duisburg	1–1	—	1–0	2–2	3–4	2–0	3–1	2–0	1–0	3–1	0–2	0–0	2–1	4–0	3–1	3–0
1. FC Düren	0–3	0–6	—	2–0	0–6	2–1	2–2	0–0	2–1	0–1	1–4	2–1	0–4	1–1	1–0	0–0
Fortuna Düsseldorf II	1–0	0–1	1–1	—	0–2	1–2	0–0	0–1	1–4	0–1	0–0	3–1	4–1	2–1	0–1	0–2
FC Gütersloh	4–3	0–1	2–0	0–2	—	3–0	2–4	2–2	1–0	0–2	2–1	3–2	2–3	3–2	3–1	7–0
Eintracht Hohkeppel	2–5	2–2	4–1	0–0	1–1	—	1–2	1–3	2–2	4–6	3–2	1–1	0–2	2–1	2–4	3–1
1. FC Köln II	4–5	1–1	1–2	0–2	0–1	2–0	—	1–2	1–3	0–0	3–2	5–0	1–0	4–0	1–0	0–1
Fortuna Köln	1–1	0–0	1–0	0–2	1–1	4–1	3–3	—	1–1	4–2	3–1	1–3	2–0	3–0	1–3	1–0
Sportfreunde Lotte	4–1	0–4	4–1	3–3	3–2	2–0	0–1	1–1	—	4–1	1–4	3–2	1–1	4–1	0–2	0–1
Borussia Mönchengladbach II	2–2	0–1	5–0	2–1	1–4	1–1	0–4	0–3	1–2	—	0–1	2–1	1–1	0–0	1–1	4–2
Rot-Weiß Oberhausen	1–2	0–2	2–0	2–1	3–2	1–0	1–1	2–0	1–1	2–4	—	2–0	2–2	0–3	3–1	3–2
SC Paderborn II	2–2	2–1	1–1	1–1	1–2	3–0	2–2	0–0	1–3	0–1	3–1	—	2–0	2–0	1–2	2–0
SV Rödinghausen	2–0	0–1	0–0	3–2	1–4	2–0	2–0	1–0	2–3	0–0	2–1	4–2	—	0–0	3–2	3–0
Schalke 04 II	0–0	1–2	1–4	3–1	1–1	5–0	1–0	0–1	1–2	0–1	1–2	0–4	2–2	—	3–1	1–0
SC Wiedenbrück	2–1	0–2	2–1	1–2	0–3	0–3	1–2	4–2	2–4	0–1	1–3	2–1	0–1	0–2	—	0–0
Wuppertaler SV	1–5	1–2	4–1	1–1	2–0	1–1	1–2	3–1	0–0	2–1	0–5	1–4	2–2	1–0	0–1	—

Source: kicker.de
Legend: Blue = home team win; Yellow = draw; Red = away team win.
For upcoming matches, an "a" indicates there is an article about the rivalry between the two participants.

=== Top scorers ===
Rank	Player	Club	Goals
1	(Czech Republic) Patrik Twardzik	FC Gütersloh	19
2	(Croatia) Noah Pesch	Borussia Mönchengladbach II	18
3	(United States) Marc Heider	Sportfreunde Lotte	16
4	(Germany) Phil Beckhoff	FC Gütersloh	15
5	(Germany) Timur Mehmet Kesim	Rot-Weiß Oberhausen	13

== Regionalliga Südwest ==
18 teams from Baden-Württemberg, Hesse, Rhineland-Palatinate and Saarland competed in the 13th season of the Regionalliga Südwest. SC Freiburg II was relegated from the 2023–24 3. Liga. Eintracht Trier was promoted from the 2023–24 Oberliga Rheinland-Pfalz/Saar, FC 08 Villingen and 1. Göppinger SV from the 2023–24 Oberliga Baden-Württemberg and FC Gießen from the 2023–24 Hessenliga.

Pos	Team	Pld	W	D	L	GF	GA	GD	Pts	Promotion or relegation
1	TSG Hoffenheim II (C, P)	34	23	6	5	86	33	+53	75	Promotion to 3. Liga
2	Kickers Offenbach	34	18	10	6	75	42	+33	64	
3	SGV Freiberg	34	19	6	9	55	37	+18	63	
4	TSV Steinbach Haiger	34	16	8	10	46	46	0	56	
5	FSV Frankfurt	34	16	7	11	60	50	+10	55	
6	Stuttgarter Kickers	34	15	7	12	56	46	+10	52	
7	SC Freiburg II	34	15	7	12	56	50	+6	52	
8	FC 08 Homburg	34	12	11	11	56	45	+11	47	
9	Hessen Kassel	34	14	5	15	54	56	−2	47	
10	Barockstadt Fulda-Lehnerz	34	11	13	10	41	45	−4	46	
11	Astoria Walldorf	34	12	7	15	57	58	−1	43	
12	Mainz 05 II	34	12	5	17	48	53	−5	41	
13	Eintracht Trier	34	11	8	15	46	61	−15	41	
14	Bahlinger SC	34	12	4	18	37	67	−30	40	
15	FC Gießen (R)	34	10	8	16	37	56	−19	38	Relegation to Oberliga
16	Eintracht Frankfurt II (R)	34	9	8	17	45	49	−4	35	Relegation to Oberliga
17	1. Göppinger SV (R)	34	9	8	17	45	64	−19	35	Relegation to Oberliga
18	FC 08 Villingen (R)	34	5	6	23	44	86	−42	21	Relegation to Oberliga

Source: kicker.de
Rules for classification: 1) Points; 2) Goal difference; 3) Goals scored; 4) Head-to-head points; 5) Head-to-head goal difference; 6) Head-to-head goals scored; 7) Head-to-head away goals scored; 8) Away goals scored; 9) Play-off (only when deciding promotion or relegation)
(C) Champions; (P) Promoted; (R) Relegated

=== Results table ===
Home \ Away	BAH	FRA	FSV	SGV	FRE	FUL	GIE	GÖP	HOF	HOM	KAS	MAI	OFF	STE	STU	TRI	VIL	WAL
Bahlinger SC	—	0–1	3–2	1–3	3–3	0–1	0–1	1–0	0–3	0–0	2–1	4–3	1–5	1–0	1–3	3–3	3–4	2–1
Eintracht Frankfurt II	7–0	—	2–2	1–1	1–5	2–3	3–0	1–2	1–2	0–1	3–2	0–0	0–0	0–1	0–0	1–2	6–0	0–0
FSV Frankfurt	1–1	3–1	—	2–1	1–0	5–1	0–1	5–2	2–1	0–3	1–4	1–0	0–1	1–1	0–1	3–1	3–0	2–2
SGV Freiberg	1–0	1–0	1–1	—	2–0	1–1	1–0	2–2	1–3	1–0	1–0	0–1	0–0	4–0	2–2	1–0	3–1	2–1
SC Freiburg II	4–0	0–0	0–3	2–1	—	1–0	0–1	4–2	1–5	3–2	1–1	1–3	2–2	3–0	2–1	4–2	1–1	2–0
Barockstadt Fulda-Lehnerz	0–1	2–1	1–1	1–2	1–0	—	1–3	0–0	0–0	1–1	1–2	1–0	0–3	0–1	2–1	3–1	1–1	2–1
FC Gießen	1–0	0–2	0–3	1–0	0–0	2–2	—	1–1	0–1	0–2	3–1	3–1	1–1	0–2	2–2	0–3	2–1	1–2
1. Göppinger SV	0–1	2–3	1–0	1–2	1–0	1–1	5–4	—	3–4	0–1	0–2	3–1	2–2	1–1	0–0	3–0	1–6	2–3
TSG Hoffenheim II	4–0	3–1	2–3	2–3	3–0	2–0	4–1	4–0	—	3–2	2–1	5–0	1–1	1–1	3–0	3–0	3–1	2–2
FC 08 Homburg	0–1	5–2	2–3	1–2	2–2	1–1	3–2	2–1	1–0	—	1–1	4–0	5–1	0–0	1–1	0–1	6–0	2–0
Hessen Kassel	2–0	2–0	0–1	1–0	1–3	1–1	2–0	0–2	2–4	2–1	—	1–3	4–1	0–2	1–3	0–0	2–1	1–4
Mainz 05 II	3–1	0–0	3–0	3–2	0–1	0–1	3–1	2–1	1–5	0–0	3–0	—	4–2	0–1	4–1	0–1	3–1	1–2
Kickers Offenbach	3–0	1–0	5–0	0–2	3–1	2–1	1–1	4–1	0–0	5–1	6–2	3–2	—	5–1	2–0	2–2	3–1	3–2
TSV Steinbach Haiger	0–2	3–1	2–1	0–2	3–0	3–3	2–3	0–1	0–0	1–1	1–3	2–1	1–0	—	2–1	1–1	3–1	2–1
Stuttgarter Kickers	1–2	2–1	0–1	3–2	0–2	2–2	3–0	3–0	1–2	3–0	1–5	1–0	1–1	5–1	—	3–2	1–0	1–0
Eintracht Trier	4–1	1–2	3–3	2–0	1–3	0–0	0–0	2–0	0–4	4–1	0–1	1–1	0–3	1–2	0–6	—	3–1	3–1
FC 08 Villingen	0–2	2–0	1–5	2–4	2–5	1–3	1–1	1–3	3–1	3–3	2–4	0–0	3–2	1–3	0–1	0–2	—	1–2
Astoria Walldorf	2–0	1–2	3–1	2–4	2–0	2–3	3–1	1–1	1–4	1–1	2–2	3–2	0–2	1–3	3–2	5–0	1–1	—

Source: kicker.de
Legend: Blue = home team win; Yellow = draw; Red = away team win.
For upcoming matches, an "a" indicates there is an article about the rivalry between the two participants.

=== Top scorers ===
Rank	Player	Club	Goals
1	(Netherlands) Cas Peters	FSV Frankfurt	21
2	(France) David Mokwa	TSG Hoffenheim II	20
2	(Germany) Justin Steinkötter	TSV Steinbach Haiger	20
4	(Germany) David Hummel	FC 08 Homburg	15
4	(Azerbaijan) Dimitrij Nazarov	Kickers Offenbach	15
4	(Germany) Yann Sturm	SC Freiburg II	15

== Regionalliga Bayern ==
18 teams from Bavaria competed in the twelfth season of the Regionalliga Bayern. SpVgg Hankofen-Hailing was promoted from the 2023–24 Bayernliga Nord and Schwaben Augsburg from the 2023–24 Bayernliga Süd.

Pos	Team	Pld	W	D	L	GF	GA	GD	Pts	Promotion, qualification or relegation
1	1. FC Schweinfurt (C, P)	34	21	5	8	70	39	+31	68	Promotion to 3. Liga and qualification for DFB-Pokal
2	TSV Buchbach	34	16	11	7	65	45	+20	59	
3	Greuther Fürth II (Note: Reserve teams are ineligible for qualification for the DFB-Pokal.)	34	15	11	8	60	45	+15	56	
4	Bayern Munich II	34	16	8	10	73	48	+25	55 (Note: Bayern Munich II was deducted 1 point due to riots during their away match against 1. FC Schweinfurt.)	
5	SpVgg Bayreuth	34	15	10	9	55	40	+15	55	
6	Würzburger Kickers	34	15	12	7	58	38	+20	53 (Note: Würzburger Kickers was deducted 4 points due to riots during their away match against 1. FC Schweinfurt.)	
7	Wacker Burghausen	34	15	7	12	60	50	+10	52	
8	DJK Vilzing	34	15	7	12	53	53	0	52	
9	FV Illertissen	34	14	9	11	44	33	+11	51	
10	SpVgg Ansbach	34	11	13	10	46	54	−8	46	
11	1. FC Nürnberg II	34	11	12	11	62	61	+1	45	
12	FC Augsburg II	34	11	9	14	66	64	+2	42	
13	TSV Aubstadt	34	10	10	14	45	50	−5	40	
14	Schwaben Augsburg	34	11	7	16	51	57	−6	40	
15	Viktoria Aschaffenburg (O)	34	9	13	12	35	47	−12	40	Qualification for relegation play-offs
16	SpVgg Hankofen-Hailing (O)	34	7	8	19	35	72	−37	29	Qualification for relegation play-offs
17	Eintracht Bamberg (R)	34	6	7	21	26	72	−46	25	Relegation to Bayernliga
18	Türkgücü München (R)	34	5	7	22	31	67	−36	22	Relegation to Bayernliga

Source: kicker.de
Rules for classification: 1) Points; 2) Goal difference; 3) Goals scored
(C) Champions; (O) Play-off winners; (P) Promoted; (R) Relegated

=== Results table ===
Home \ Away	ANS	ASC	AUB	FCA	AUG	BAM	BAY	BUC	BUR	FÜR	HAN	ILL	MUN	TÜR	NÜR	SCH	VIL	WÜR
SpVgg Ansbach	—	4–1	1–1	2–1	2–1	1–1	0–1	2–2	0–3	0–0	4–0	1–0	1–0	1–1	1–4	0–2	1–1	1–2
Viktoria Aschaffenburg	4–1	—	1–1	0–0	1–0	0–0	1–0	0–0	0–4	3–3	2–1	1–0	0–2	1–0	3–1	2–2	0–2	0–2
TSV Aubstadt	2–3	1–1	—	0–5	2–3	5–2	0–0	1–1	0–1	1–3	0–1	1–3	2–1	2–1	1–1	1–0	4–2	0–1
FC Augsburg II	7–1	2–1	0–3	—	2–5	0–1	1–1	4–3	2–3	1–1	1–1	0–0	1–3	0–1	5–4	2–6	0–2	1–3
Schwaben Augsburg	2–3	2–1	0–2	0–3	—	2–0	1–1	0–2	3–2	2–3	1–1	0–1	1–1	1–1	0–3	4–3	3–2	1–1
Eintracht Bamberg	1–3	1–1	0–3	3–3	0–2	—	0–3	0–4	0–4	1–0	2–0	0–2	0–2	0–2	4–4	2–1	1–2	0–4
SpVgg Bayreuth	1–3	3–0	3–0	2–2	3–2	1–0	—	2–0	1–0	1–0	1–0	1–0	1–1	4–0	1–1	0–1	2–4	1–1
TSV Buchbach	1–1	3–0	3–2	5–2	1–1	2–1	4–1	—	1–1	1–4	5–1	3–0	2–1	2–0	0–0	1–1	1–1	1–0
Wacker Burghausen	0–0	0–0	0–0	2–1	1–0	0–1	3–1	2–2	—	2–4	4–1	1–1	0–1	1–0	3–3	2–5	1–3	2–0
Greuther Fürth II	1–1	3–1	1–1	2–6	1–0	2–2	3–1	1–3	3–1	—	3–0	0–3	5–1	3–2	1–1	1–1	2–0	1–1
SpVgg Hankofen-Hailing	2–1	0–3	1–0	1–1	4–2	1–0	1–0	1–1	3–5	0–3	—	0–1	2–0	0–2	1–2	1–3	2–3	1–1
FV Illertissen	0–0	1–0	3–1	0–0	1–1	1–0	3–3	2–0	1–2	0–0	3–1	—	2–2	2–1	0–2	1–3	5–0	0–1
Bayern Munich II	2–2	4–1	2–2	2–4	3–0	6–0	4–2	2–3	5–2	4–0	1–1	3–2	—	5–0	4–0	1–2	1–1	0–2
Türkgücü München	2–2	0–2 (Note: Türkgücü München's home matches against 1. FC Schweinfurt, Wacker Burghausen and Viktoria Aschaffenburg were awarded to the respective away team with a 2–0 score due to Türkgücü München not being able to provide a home stadium.)	1–3	1–2	1–3	1–2	1–4	1–4	0–2	1–0	2–2	2–2	1–1	—	0–1	0–2	0–2	2–2
1. FC Nürnberg II	1–1	3–3	1–0	3–1	2–1	4–0	1–3	1–2	3–1	0–2	2–2	2–0	1–2	1–3	—	2–3	1–1	3–3
1. FC Schweinfurt	1–2	1–1	2–0	2–0	0–2	2–0	0–0	3–1	3–2	2–1	5–0	1–0	1–2	2–0	4–1	—	3–2	2–1
DJK Vilzing	1–0	0–0	0–1	0–3	0–4	3–0	2–2	3–1	0–3	0–2	3–1	0–1	3–0	3–1	3–1	3–1	—	1–1
Würzburger Kickers	5–0	0–0	1–1	0–3	3–1	1–1	0–4	3–0	2–0	1–1	5–1	0–3	1–4	3–0	2–2	1–0	4–0	—

Source: kicker.de
Legend: Blue = home team win; Yellow = draw; Red = away team win.
For upcoming matches, an "a" indicates there is an article about the rivalry between the two participants.

=== Top scorers ===
Rank	Player	Club	Goals
1	(Uruguay) Juan Ignacio Cabrera	FC Augsburg II	18
1	(Germany) Daniel Kasper	Greuther Fürth II	18
3	(Germany) Michael Dellinger	1. FC Schweinfurt	14
4	(Germany) Joshua Endres	1. FC Schweinfurt	13
4	(Germany) Michael Sperr	SpVgg Ansbach	13

=== Relegation play-offs ===
Team 1	Agg.	Team 2	1st leg	2nd leg
SC Eltersdorf	1–1 (1–4 p)	Viktoria Aschaffenburg	1–0	0–1 (a.e.t.)
SV Erlbach	1–2	SpVgg Hankofen-Hailing	0–1	1–1

== Promotion play-offs ==
The order of the legs was determined in a draw. The matches were originally scheduled for 25 and 31 May, but since Lokomotive Leipzig qualified for the final of the 2024–25 Saxony Cup, they were instead played on 28 May and 1 June.

Team 1	Agg.	Team 2	1st leg	2nd leg
Lokomotive Leipzig	1–4	TSV Havelse	1–1	0–3 (a.e.t.)

All times Central European Summer Time (UTC+2)

28 May 2025
19:00

Lokomotive Leipzig	1–1	TSV Havelse
Čevis 90+1'	Report	Ilic 89'

Bruno-Plache-Stadion, Leipzig
Attendance: 10,080
Referee: Michael Bacher
1 June 2025
13:30

TSV Havelse	3–0 (a.e.t.)	Lokomotive Leipzig
Düker 95'; Ilic 109'; Paldino 114'	Report

Wilhelm-Langrehr-Stadion, Garbsen
Attendance: 2,300
Referee: Patrick Alt

TSV Havelse won 4–1 on aggregate and was promoted to the 2025–26 3. Liga.
