= Amegnaglo =

Amegnaglo is a Togolese surname. Notable people with the surname include:

- David Amegnaglo (born 2005), French footballer
- Thomas Amegnaglo (born 1991), Togolese footballer
