= Nikky Goguadze =

Dutch footballer (born 1998)

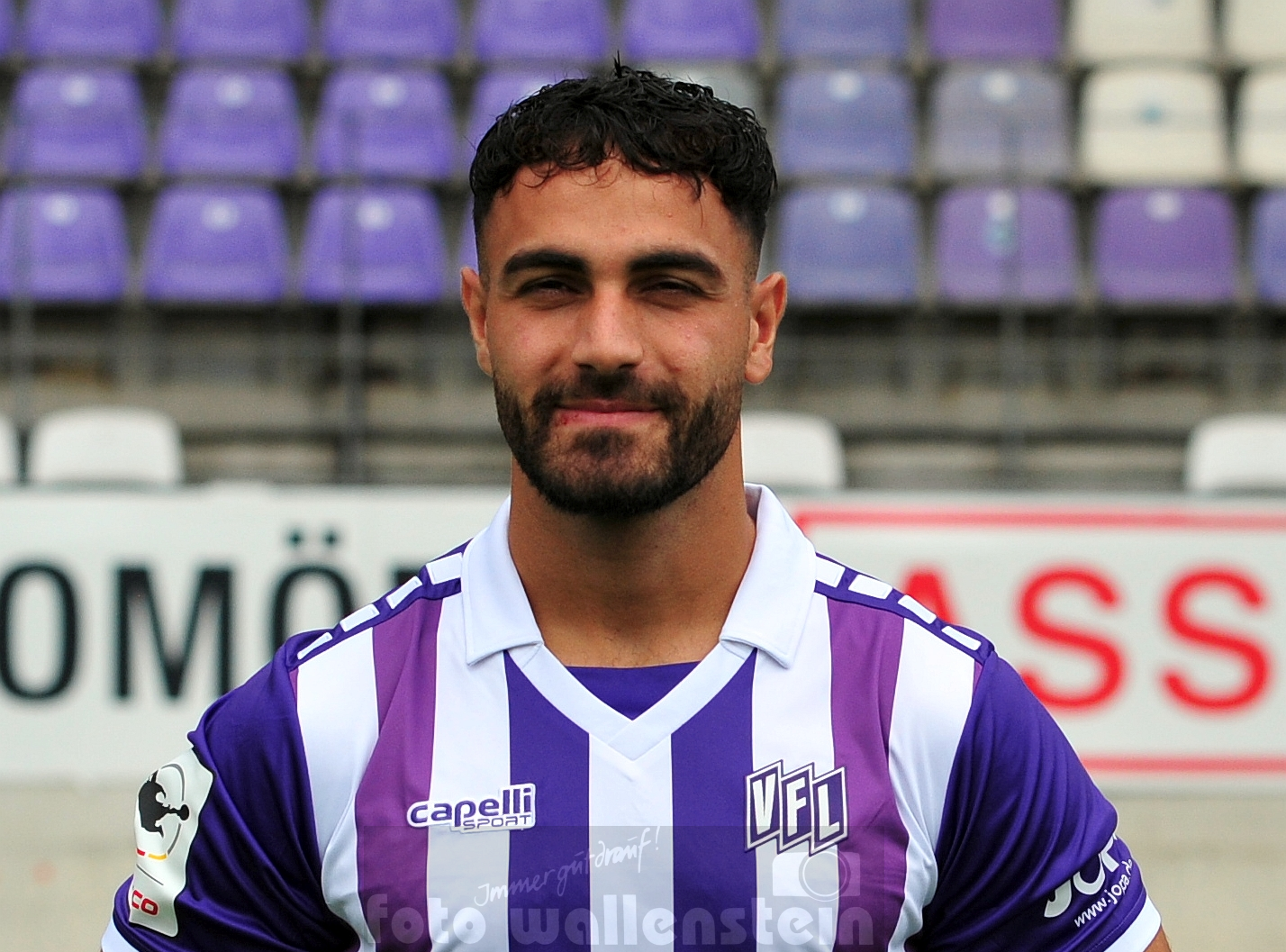
- Goguadze with VfL Osnabrück in 2025

Personal information
- Date of birth: 15 July 1998 (age 28)
- Place of birth: Groningen, Netherlands
- Height: 1.77 m (5 ft 10 in)
- Position: Forward

Team information
- Current team: FC St. Pauli II
- Number: 30

Senior career*
Years	Team	Apps	(Gls)
2016–2017	Be Quick 1887		
2017–2018	PKC'83		
2018–2019	Germania Leer	17	(17)
2019	Bremer SV	8	(1)
2019–2020	SSV Jeddeloh	15	(3)
2020–2021	GW Firrel	4	(3)
2021	Kickers Emden	15	(6)
2022	PKC'83		
2022–2023	Bremer SV	31	(9)
2023–2024	TSV Havelse	9	(0)
2024–2025	Bremer SV	34	(31)
2025–2026	VfL Osnabrück	7	(2)
2026–	FC St. Pauli II	23	(6)
- * Club domestic league appearances and goals as of 22 September 2026

Nikky Goguadze (born 15 July 1998) is a Dutch professional footballer who plays as a forward for German Regionalliga Nord side FC St. Pauli II.

== Career ==
Born in Groningen, Netherlands, Goguadze played for local club VV PKC'83 before joining German side Germania Leer, playing in the seventh-tier Bezirksliga, along with his brothers Giorgi and David in summer 2018. He was the club's top scorer having scored 17 goals in as many matches when he left in January 2019 to sign with Bremer SV of the fifth-tier Oberliga Bremen. Bremer SV narrowly missed out on promotion to the Regionalliga Nord while Germania Leer achieved promotion.

Goguadze moved to Regionalliga Nord club SSV Jeddeloh in summer 2019 and scored 3 goals in 15 appearances.

In May 2020 Goguadze signed a one-year contract with GW Firrel of the sixth-tier Landesliga, reuniting with his brothers. In January 2021 he had trials at Georgian first-tier club Torpedo Kutaisi and Georgian second-tier side Merani Tbilisi, together with his brothers. While at GW Firrel the season was prematurely cancelled due to the COVID-19 pandemic.

In May 2021 Goguadze moved to Oberliga Niedersachsen side Kickers Emden with his brothers. They left the club in January 2022 after they refused COVID-19 vaccination, making them ineligible to play in the state of Lower Saxony and Nikky Goguadze returned to former club PKC'83 in Groningen.

In summer 2022 Goguadze re-signed with Bremer SV. He contributed nine goals and four assists in the 2022–23 season, helping Bremer SV remain in the Regionalliga Nord. For the following season he moved to league rivals TSV Havelse, where he made nine appearances without scoring.

In January 2024 Goguadze returned to Bremer SV for a second time. He scored 13 goals in 16 appearances in the second half of the 2023–24 season, helping his club retain Regionalliga status. After 15 matches played in the 2024–25 season the club was fighting relegation while he had scored 14 goals, making him the best goal scorer in the German fourth tier, and he was linked with a winter move to the 3. Liga. By the winter break, he had scored 18 goals in 19 matches played, making him the league's top scorer.

In January 2025 Goguadze moved 3. Liga club VfL Osnabrück for an undisclosed transfer fee.

On 2 January 2026, Goguadze joined fourth-tier side FC St. Pauli II, the reserve team of St. Pauli.

== Style of play ==
Goguadze is known for his athleticism and strength despite being relatively small for a forward.

== Personal life ==
Goguadze's father is from Georgia and played for Dinamo Tbilisi. Nikky Goguadze has two brothers, Giorgi and David, with whom he has played together at some of his former clubs. As of May 2021 he had Dutch citizenship.

== Career statistics ==
As of match played 20 June 2026

Appearances and goals by club, season and competition
Club	Season	League			DFB-Pokal		Other		Total	
Club	Season	Division	Apps	Goals	Apps	Goals	Apps	Goals	Apps	Goals
Germania Leer	2018–19	Bezirksliga Weser-Ems	17	17	–		–		17	17
Bremer SV	2018–19	Oberliga Bremen	8	1	–		2 (Note: Appearances in promotion play-offs)	0	10	1
SSV Jeddeloh	2019–20	Regionalliga Nord	15	3	–		–		15	3
Kickers Emden	2021–22	Oberliga Niedersachsen	15	6	–		–		15	6
Bremer SV	2022–23	Regionalliga Nord	31	9	1	0	2 (Note: Appearances in relegation play-offs)	0	34	9
TSV Havelse	2023–24	Regionalliga Nord	9	0	–		–		9	0
Bremer SV	2023–24	Regionalliga Nord	16	13	–		–		16	13
Bremer SV	2024–25	Regionalliga Nord	19	17	1	0	–		20	17
Bremer SV	Total		35	30	1	0	0	0	36	30
VfL Osnabrück	2024–25	3. Liga	6	2	0	0	0	0	6	2
VfL Osnabrück	2025–26	3. Liga	1	0	0	0	0	0	1	0
VfL Osnabrück	Total		7	2	1	0	0	0	7	2
St. Pauli II	2025–26	Regionalliga Nord	13	2	–		–		13	2
Career total			133	53	2	0	4	0	139	53
