= Alexander Höck =

German footballer

Personal information
- Date of birth: 30 March 2002 (age 24)
- Place of birth: Porz, Germany
- Height: 1.94 m (6 ft 4 in)
- Position: Centre-back

Team information
- Current team: Rödinghausen
- Number: 5

Youth career
- –2012: 1.JFS Köln
- 2012–2017: Bayer Leverkusen
- 2017–2020: Viktoria Köln

Senior career*
Years	Team	Apps	(Gls)
2020–2022	Viktoria Köln	7	(1)
2022–2024	Werder Bremen II	20	(0)
2024–	Rödinghausen	13	(0)
- * Club domestic league appearances and goals as of 23 September 2026

Alexander Höck (born 30 March 2002) is a German professional footballer who plays as a centre-back for Rödinghausen.

== Career ==
In April 2022 it was announced that Höck would join Werder Bremen II for the 2022–23 season.

== Career statistics ==
As of 9 July 2020

Appearances and goals by club, season and competition
Club	Season	League			Cup		Continental		Other		Total	
Club	Season	Division	Apps	Goals	Apps	Goals	Apps	Goals	Apps	Goals	Apps	Goals
Viktoria Köln	2019–20	3. Liga	2	1	0	0	–		0	0	2	1
Career total			2	1	0	0	0	0	0	0	2	1
