= Mike Sadlo =

German footballer

Personal information
- Date of birth: 19 September 1971 (age 55)
- Place of birth: Schleiz, Bezirk Gera, East Germany
- Height: 1.76 m (5 ft 9 in)
- Position: Striker

Youth career
- –1989: Carl Zeiss Jena

Senior career*
Years	Team	Apps	(Gls)
1989–1996	Carl Zeiss Jena II		
1995–1996	Carl Zeiss Jena	1	(0)
1996–1999	Erzgebirge Aue	93	(26)
1999–2001	VfL Halle 96	65	(20)
2001–2004	VfB Leipzig	90	(48)
2004–2008	1. FC Gera	??	(68)
2009–2010	Normania Treffurt		

Managerial career
- 2004: VfB Leipzig
- 2011: 1. FC Lokomotive Leipzig
- 2012–2013: 1. FC Lokomotive Leipzig II
- 2013–2018: SG Union Sandersdorf
- 2020: Sonnenhof Großaspach
- * Club domestic league appearances and goals

Mike Sadlo (born 19 September 1971) is a German former footballer.
