= Henri Weigelt =

German footballer (born 1998)

Personal information
- Date of birth: 17 January 1998 (age 28)
- Place of birth: Bielefeld, Germany
- Height: 1.89 m (6 ft 2 in)
- Position: Centre-back

Team information
- Current team: SV Rödinghausen
- Number: 31

Youth career
- Arminia Bielefeld

Senior career*
Years	Team	Apps	(Gls)
2017–2018	Arminia Bielefeld II	14	(0)
2017–2018	Arminia Bielefeld	10	(0)
2018–2020	Jong AZ	28	(1)
2020–2021	Borussia Dortmund II	19	(0)
2021–2024	TSV Steinbach Haiger	59	(1)
2022	TSV Steinbach Haiger II	2	(0)
2024–2026	Eintracht Trier	39	(2)
2026–	SV Rödinghausen	1	(0)
- * Club domestic league appearances and goals as of 23 September 2026

Henri Weigelt (born 17 January 1998) is a German professional footballer who plays as a centre-back for SV Rödinghausen.

== Career ==
Weigeilt made one appearance for Eredivisie club AZ in a cup match against Alcides. He was released on 30 June 2020.
