= Thorsten Tönnies =

German footballer

Personal information
- Date of birth: 13 March 1991 (age 35)
- Place of birth: Lohne, Germany
- Height: 1.79 m (5 ft 10 in)
- Positions: Midfielder; defender

Team information
- Current team: Blau-Weiß Lohne
- Number: 21

Youth career
- 1996–2007: Blau-Weiß Lohne
- 2007–2010: Werder Bremen

Senior career*
Years	Team	Apps	(Gls)
2010–2011	Werder Bremen II	1	(0)
2011–2012	Schwarz-Weiß Rehden	32	(10)
2012–2018	VfB Oldenburg	176	(24)
2018–2021	SSV Jeddeloh	64	(6)
2021–	Blau-Weiß Lohne	135	(41)

International career
2009	Germany U18	3	(0)
2009	Germany U19	1	(0)
- * Club domestic league appearances and goals as of 20 June 2026

Thorsten Tönnies (born 13 March 1991) is a German former professional footballer who plays as a midfielder or defender for Blau-Weiß Lohne.

== Career ==
Tönnies made his professional debut for Werder Bremen II on 21 August 2010 in the 3. Liga, coming on as a substitute for Lennart Thy against Hansa Rostock, which finished as a 2–0 away loss.

In summer 2021 Tönnies left Regionalliga Nord club SSV Jeddeloh to return to his youth club Blau-Weiß Lohne of the fifth-tier Oberliga Niedersachsen. Lohne targeted promotion to the Regionalliga Nord for the next two seasons.

== Personal life ==
Tönnies works as a teacher in Bakum.
