= Pelle Hoppe =

German footballer

Personal information
- Full name: Jan-Pelle Hoppe
- Date of birth: 7 June 1999 (age 27)
- Place of birth: Varel, Germany
- Height: 1.86 m (6 ft 1 in)
- Position: Forward

Team information
- Current team: Eimsbütteler TV
- Number: 28

Youth career
- –2011: VfB Oldenburg
- 2011–2018: Werder Bremen

Senior career*
Years	Team	Apps	(Gls)
2018–2019	Werder Bremen II	5	(0)
2019–2020	Chemnitzer FC	16	(5)
2020	Kickers Offenbach	2	(0)
2020–2021	Germania Halberstadt	3	(2)
2021–2022	Berliner FC Dynamo	15	(1)
2022–2023	FC Eintracht Norderstedt 03	42	(14)
2023–2025	Weiche Flensburg	32	(10)
2025–2026	Blau-Weiß Lohne	25	(5)
2026–	Eimsbütteler TV	5	(1)
- * Club domestic league appearances and goals as of 22 September 2026

Jan-Pelle Hoppe (born 7 June 1999) is a German professional footballer who plays as a forward for Eimsbütteler TV.

== Career ==
Hoppe made his debut in the 3. Liga for Chemnitzer FC on 21 July 2019, coming on as a substitute in the 90th minute for Dejan Božić in the 1–1 home draw against Waldhof Mannheim.

On 10 January 2020, Hoppe moved to Kickers Offenbach on a deal until June 2021.

On 9 June 2023, Weiche Flensburg announced the signing of Hoppe.
