= Ayodele Adetula =

German footballer (born 1998)

Personal information
- Full name: Ayodele Max Adetula
- Date of birth: 9 February 1998 (age 28)
- Place of birth: Bremen, Germany
- Height: 1.82 m (6 ft 0 in)
- Position: Winger

Team information
- Current team: 1. FC Lokomotive Leipzig
- Number: 11

Youth career
- 2003–2013: Werder Bremen
- 2013–2017: Eintracht Braunschweig

Senior career*
Years	Team	Apps	(Gls)
2017–2019	Eintracht Braunschweig II	55	(13)
2018–2019	Eintracht Braunschweig	1	(0)
2019–2020	Rot-Weiss Essen	15	(3)
2020–2023	VfB Oldenburg	48	(14)
2023	TSV Steinbach Haiger	14	(4)
2024–2025	SV Rödinghausen	33	(4)
2025–	1. FC Lokomotive Leipzig	44	(21)
- * Club domestic league appearances and goals as of 23 September 2026

Ayodele Max Adetula (born 9 February 1998) is a German professional footballer who plays as a winger for 1. FC Lokomotive Leipzig.

== Career ==
Adetula made his professional debut with Eintracht Braunschweig in the 3. Liga.

He joined Regionalliga Nord club VfB Oldenburg in October 2020, after his contract with Rot-Weiss Essen was terminated.
