= Tobias Dombrowa =

German footballer

Personal information
- Date of birth: 24 July 1999 (age 27)
- Place of birth: Potsdam, Germany
- Height: 1.70 m (5 ft 7 in)
- Position: Midfielder

Team information
- Current team: 1. FC Lokomotive Leipzig
- Number: 34

Youth career
- –2011: Fortuna Babelsberg
- 2011–2017: SV Babelsberg 03

Senior career*
Years	Team	Apps	(Gls)
2017–2021	SV Babelsberg 03	71	(8)
2021–2022	SV Meppen	11	(0)
2022–	1. FC Lokomotive Leipzig	134	(5)
- * Club domestic league appearances and goals as of 23 September 2026

Tobias Dombrowa (born 24 July 1999) is a German professional footballer who plays as a midfielder for 1. FC Lokomotive Leipzig.

== Career ==
=== SV Babelsberg 03 ===
Born in Potsdam, Dombrowa played youth football for Fortuna Babelsberg before joining SV Babelsberg 03 in 2011. In July 2017, Dombrowa signed a four-year first-team contract with Babelsberg. He made his professional debut as an 84th-minute substitute in a 2–1 Regionalliga Nordost victory over Hertha BSC II on 30 July 2017. He made 11 appearances across the 2017–18 season. He scored the first goal of his career on 8 August 2018 with the third goal of a 5–0 win over Berliner AK 07. Over four seasons at Babelsberg, Dombrowa scored 8 goals in 71 appearances.

=== SV Meppen ===
On 19 June 2021, Dombrowa signed for 3. Liga side SV Meppen on a two-year contract. He made his 3. Liga debut on 24 July 2021 in a 3–1 defeat to Hallescher FC.
