= Maxim Gresler =

German footballer

Personal information
- Date of birth: 3 June 2003 (age 23)
- Place of birth: Bad Tölz, Germany
- Height: 1.78 m (5 ft 10 in)
- Position: Left-back

Team information
- Current team: SV Rödinghausen
- Number: 32

Youth career
- TSV Wolfratshausen
- –2020: 1860 Munich

Senior career*
Years	Team	Apps	(Gls)
2020–2023	1860 Munich II	38	(4)
2020–2022	1860 Munich	2	(0)
2023–2025	1. FC Nürnberg II	42	(1)
2026–	SV Rödinghausen	11	(1)
- * Club domestic league appearances and goals as of 24 June 2026

Maxim Gresler (born 3 June 2003) is a German professional footballer who plays as a left-back for SV Rödinghausen.

== Career ==
Gresler signed his first professional contract with 1860 Munich on 2 March 2020. He made his professional debut for the team in the 3. Liga on 9 January 2021, coming on as a substitute for Merveille Biankadi in second-half stoppage time against Bayern Munich II. The match finished as a 2–0 away win for 1860.
