= Maurice Boakye =

German footballer

Personal information
- Full name: Maurice Osei Boakye
- Date of birth: 1 September 2004 (age 22)
- Place of birth: Hamburg, Germany
- Height: 1.79 m (5 ft 10 in)
- Position: Forward

Team information
- Current team: Marítimo
- Number: 90

Youth career
- SC Concordia von 1907
- 2020–2022: Hamburger SV
- 2022–2023: Eimsbütteler TV

Senior career*
Years	Team	Apps	(Gls)
2023–2024	Eimsbütteler TV	34	(7)
2024–2025	VfB Stuttgart II	4	(0)
2025–2026	Hamburger SV II	43	(26)
2026–	Marítimo	1	(0)
- * Club domestic league appearances and goals as of 19:00, 15 August 2026 (UTC)

Maurice Osei Boakye (born 1 September 2004) is a German professional footballer who plays as a forward for the Primeira Liga club Marítimo.

== Career ==
Boakye is a product of the youth academies of the German clubs SC Concordia von 1907, Hamburger SV and Eimsbütteler TV. He began his senior career with Eimsbüttel in 2023 and helped them achieve promotion to the Regionalliga. On 6 May 2024, he joined VfB Stuttgart II in the Regionalliga. He moved over to Hamburger SV II on 3 February 2025. He scored 23 goals and made 5 assists with Hamburger SV II for the 2025–26 season.

On 7 July 2026, Boakye transferred to the newly promoted Portuguese club Marítimo in the Primeira Liga on a contract until 2029.

== Personal life ==
Born in Germany, Boakye is of Ghanaian descent.
