= Thuringia derby =

Football rivalry

- FC Carl Zeiss Jena FC Rot-Weiß Erfurt
- Location: Thuringia
- First meeting: Turbine Erfurt 2–1 Motor Jena (19 November 1952); 1952–53 Oberliga
- Latest meeting: Rot-Weiß Erfurt 3–1 Carl Zeiss Jena (28 November 2025); 2025–26 Regionalliga Nordost
- Next meeting: Carl Zeiss Jena v Rot-Weiß Erfurt (16 May 2026); 2025–26 Regionalliga Nordost
- Stadiums: Ernst-Abbe-Sportfeld (Carl Zeiss Jena); Steigerwaldstadion (Rot-Weiß Erfurt)

Statistics
- Total meetings: 93
- Most wins: Carl Zeiss Jena (38)

The Thuringia derby (German: Thüringenderby) is a long-standing and intense football rivalry between the two major clubs from the German state of Thuringia - FC Carl Zeiss Jena and Rot-Weiß Erfurt. It is considered one of the most heated regional derbies in German football.

== History ==
The derby dates back to the 1950s when both clubs were leading teams in East Germany's top division, the DDR-Oberliga. During this era, FC Carl Zeiss Jena and Rot-Weiß Erfurt were the dominant clubs in the Thuringia region, and their matches were highly anticipated and passionately contested.

After German reunification in 1990, the derby continued in the reunified Bundesliga and 2. Bundesliga as the two clubs spent many seasons in the same division, ensuring the rivalry remained fierce. Matches between FC Carl Zeiss Jena and Rot-Weiß Erfurt are known for their intense atmospheres, with fans of both teams creating tense and hostile environments in the stadiums.

== Notable matches ==
Some of the most memorable Thuringia derby matches include:

- 1954 DDR-Oberliga: FC Carl Zeiss Jena 2-1 Rot-Weiß Erfurt
- 1964 DDR-Oberliga: Rot-Weiß Erfurt 1-0 FC Carl Zeiss Jena
- 1998 2. Bundesliga: FC Carl Zeiss Jena 3-2 Rot-Weiß Erfurt
- 2012 3. Liga: Rot-Weiß Erfurt 1-0 FC Carl Zeiss Jena

The 1998 match, in which FC Carl Zeiss Jena defeated Rot-Weiß Erfurt 3-2, represents the largest documented margin of victory in a Thuringia derby.

== Current status ==
As of the 2024-25 season, both FC Carl Zeiss Jena and Rot-Weiß Erfurt play in the Regionalliga Nordost, Germany's [4 tier]. Their most recent meeting was a 3-1 win for Erfurt at home in April 2025. The Thuringia Derby remains an important fixture for the supporters of both clubs, who continue to passionately back their team in these regional clashes.

== Statistics ==
Competition	Played	Carl Zeiss Jena wins	Draws	Rot-Weiß Erfurt wins	Carl Zeiss Jena goals	Rot-Weiß Erfurt goals
2. Bundesliga	2	2	0	0	2	0
3. Liga	10	3	1	6	9	15
DDR-Oberliga	63	27	17	19	91	63
Regionalliga Nord	2	2	0	0	3	0
Regionalliga Nordost	11	2	7	2	15	12
Regionalliga Süd	2	0	2	0	0	0
FDGB-Pokal	3	2	1	0	9	5
Total	93	38	28	27	129	95
