= Dejan Božić =

German footballer

Personal information
- Date of birth: 22 January 1993 (age 33)
- Place of birth: Neckargartach, Germany
- Height: 1.94 m (6 ft 4 in)
- Position: Forward

Team information
- Current team: Stuttgarter Kickers
- Number: 33

Youth career
- –1999: TSV Nordheim
- 1999–2004: FC Heilbronn
- 2004–2005: TV Flein
- 2005–2010: 1899 Hoffenheim
- 2010–2011: FC Astoria Walldorf

Senior career*
Years	Team	Apps	(Gls)
2011–2013	FC Astoria Walldorf	60	(30)
2011	FC Astoria Walldorf II	3	(5)
2013–2015	SC Freiburg II	30	(5)
2015–2016	FC Astoria Walldorf	33	(9)
2016–2018	TuS Koblenz	65	(15)
2018–2020	Chemnitzer FC	61	(25)
2020–2021	SV Meppen	25	(2)
2021–2023	Kickers Offenbach	53	(16)
2023–2026	Chemnitzer FC	67	(36)
2026–	Stuttgarter Kickers	8	(4)
- * Club domestic league appearances and goals as of 24 September 2026

Dejan Božić (Serbian Cyrillic: Дејан Божић; born 22 January 1993) is a German professional footballer who plays as a forward for Stuttgarter Kickers.

== Career ==
Božić made his debut in the 3. Liga for Chemnitzer FC on 21 July 2019, starting against Waldhof Mannheim before being substituted out in the 90th minute for Pelle Hoppe, with the match finishing as a 1–1 home draw.
