= Eimsbütteler TV =

- Full name: Eimsbütteler Turnverband
- Founded: 12 June 1889; 137 years ago
- Ground: ETV-Sportcenter Hoheluft
- Capacity: 1,100
- Chairman: Frank Fechner
- Manager: Can Schultz
- League: Regionalliga Nord (IV)
- 2025–26: Oberliga Hamburg, 2nd of 18 (promoted via play-off)
Home colours	Away colours

Eimsbütteler Turnverband is a German sports club based in Eimsbüttel, Hamburg. Apart from football, the club also offers a variety of other sports, like basketball, volleyball, and fencing. The club's golden era was in the 1930s and early 1940s when it made five appearances in the German championship finals round and won a number of Hamburg city championships against the now much more prominent clubs Hamburger SV and FC St. Pauli.

As of 2022, the club's most successful team have been the volleyball women who play in the German Women's 2 Volleyball Bundesliga.

Eimsbütteler TV made headlines in 2011 when it lost almost its complete first and second teams because of disagreements over how to split the money earned from reaching the first round of the 2011–12 DFB-Pokal after winning the Hamburg Cup. ETV was forced to field a side predominantly made up of players from its under-19 side.

== History ==
=== The beginnings ===
The roots of the association lay in the 12 June 1889 formation of the gymnastics club Eimsbütteler Turnerschaft. This club broke up within a month when a number of members left to form Eimsbütteler Männerturnverein. On 1 May 1893 the two groups were re-united as Hamburg-Eimsbütteler Turnverein, while a new association using the name Eimsbütteler Turnerschaft was established 28 December the same year. This club in turn joined HETV to create Eimsbütteler Turnverband on 19 February 1898 with the goal of constructing a common sports hall. The facility was completed in 1910, under the direction of the chairman Julius Sparbier.

A football department was established within ETV on 12 May 1906 and the footballers took up play in the A-Klasse Hamburg, the highest league in the city. They sent their first representative to the national side in 1910 and won their first city title in 1915. The team went on to make several appearances in the playoff round of the country's northern regional league in the late 20s and early 30s. In 1926, they lost the final of the regional Nordpokal (North German Cup) to Holstein Kiel by a score of 1–3.

=== The club's golden years ===
The Eimsbüttel side enjoyed its greatest success playing in the Gauliga Nordmark, one of sixteen top flight divisions formed in the 1933 reorganization of German football under the Third Reich. The team captured titles there in 1934, 1935, 1936, 1940 and 1942, often in close contests with better known club Hamburger SV. These Gauliga titles qualified ETV for participation in the preliminary rounds of the national championship where they scored victories in matches against eventual champions FC Schalke 04 in group play in both 1934 and 1935. Their best result came in 1940 when they finished runners-up in their group to Dresdner SC.

ETV made several appearances in the opening rounds of the Tschammerpokal tournament (1935–37, 1939–42), predecessor to today's DFB-Pokal, and also saw four different players capped through the 1930s and 40s.

World War II forced play across the country to become more local in character and the Gauliga Nordmark was broken up into three separate leagues after the 1941–42 season. ETV became part of the new Gauliga Hamburg where they were able only to earn lower table results. The club's sports facilities were, like most of Hamburg, heavily damaged in air raids. From 1948, under the leadership of Robert Finn, the ETV started to rebuild its facilities.

=== Postwar ===
Post-war play in 1945 in the Stadtliga Hamburg saw the ETV continue as a mid-table team. A fifth-place finish in the 1946–47 season was not quite enough to qualify for the new Oberliga Nord, one of five new first division circuits within the country, which admitted the top four finishers from Hamburg. ETV won its way to the Oberliga the next year on the strength of a campaign that saw the team capture its division by winning seventeen and drawing one its of eighteen matches.

The ETV spent the next eight seasons at the Oberliga level until being sent down to the Amateurliga Hamburg after a sixteenth-place finish in 1956. The team suffered through two consecutive poor seasons, narrowly missing relegation to the third tier. After recovering to win the division title in 1959 they were unable to advance further after doing poorly in promotion round play. They earned lower table results over most of the next several seasons and with the establishment of the Bundesliga in 1963, the second division Amateurliga became a third tier circuit where ETV continued to struggle against relegation. A last place finish in 1965–66 dropped Eimsbüttel to the Verbandsliga Hamburg – Germania-Staffel (IV).

The club generally finished in the upper half of the Verbandsliga table until declining in the latter half of the 70s. They earned a second-place result in 1980–81, but were eventually relegated to the Bezirksliga (V) in 1985 after a fifteenth-place finish. In the face of frequent league restructuring, ETV avoided slipping deeper into lower-tier football through timely promotions. In 1989, they moved up to the Landesliga Hamburg (V), and then made a quick advance in the late 90s, winning their way to the Verbandsliga Hamburg (V) in 1998, and then into the Oberliga Hamburg/Schleswig-Holstein (IV) the following year after a second-place finish.

The club was overmatched in Oberliga play and struggled against relegation for four seasons, only avoiding demotion by the voluntarily withdrawal of other teams facing financial and license problems. Their turn in the Oberliga came to an end in 2003, when the ETV was unable to avoid being sent down to the Verbandsliga (V).

The club's decline continued with a descent through the Landsliga Hamburg (VI) in 2005, to the Bezirksliga Hamburg-Nord (VII) in 2006. ETV enjoyed a successful 2007–08 regular season, finishing second on equal points with league winner Rahlstedter SC. This entitled the team to take part in the Landesliga promotion round where they finished fourth in the four-team competition.

The 2008–09 season saw the club compete on the same level with its first and second team, but in separate leagues. ETV finished fourth in its league, the Bezirksliga Nord, while ETV II came second in the Bezirksliga Süd and earned promotion to the Landesliga through the play-off round. Consequently, the first team took up the second team's spot in this league in 2009–10 and was coached by the second team's coach Dennis Mitteregger.

In 2010–11, ETV came ninth in the league but took out the Hamburg Cup for the first time in its history. This cup win however cost the club its coach and the majority of its players. While the club wanted to award 50 percent of the earnings for reaching the first round of the cup, Euro 110,000, to the football department, the players demanded a share of up to 75 percent. When this was not granted, players and coach left the club. After the club's second team players left ETV out of solidarity with the first team too, the club was forced to field its successful under-19 side instead, strengthened by the return of three of the players that had resigned earlier.

In 2014, the club suffered relegation from the Landesliga back to the Bezirksliga but regained promotion in 2019 by winning its first Bezirksliga title.

The club has a large youth section in its football department, both for girls and boys with nearly forty teams in all age-groups.

Older logo

== German championship ==
The most successful time in the club's history was most certainly the Gauliga years when the 'TV qualified for the German championship finals five times:

- 1934: Finished last in its group out of four teams, but managed to defeat FC Schalke 04 3–2 in Hamburg after Schalke lead 2–0, Schalke went on to win the championship.
- 1935: Finished third in its group out of four teams, again defeated FC Schalke 04 in Hamburg, who won the championship again.
- 1936: Finished third again in its group out of four teams.
- 1940: Finished second in its group out of four teams, missing out on the semi-finals to Dresdner SC who went on to lose the final.
- 1942: Lost to Werder Bremen in the first round of the knock-out finals, losing 2–4 in Bremen.

== Players ==
=== Current squad ===
As of 8 September 2026

Note: Flags indicate national team as defined under FIFA eligibility rules; some limited exceptions apply. Players may hold more than one non-FIFA nationality.

No.	Pos.	Nation	Player
1	GK	GER	Max Wendt
2	DF	GER	Noah Lemke
3	DF	GER	Albin Nishori
4	DF	GER	Samuel Olayisoye
6	MF	GER	Bamo Karim
7	FW	GER	Lamin Bueck
8	DF	GER	Abdul-Malik Yago
10	MF	GER	Jon Pauli
11	FW	GER	Toralf Hense (on loan from Holstein Kiel)
12	DF	GER	Gabriel Michalek
14	MF	GER	Nick Hoffmann
16	DF	GER	Stephan Wemakor
18	MF	GER	Kahn Demirbag
20	DF	GER	Romeo Blekic
21	MF	GER	Oguzhan Güceyter
23	DF	GER	Jasper Hölscher

No.	Pos.	Nation	Player
24	DF	GER	Juri Marxen
25	MF	GER	Emre Töremis
27	FW	GER	Max Mbodje
28	MF	GER	Pelle Hoppe
29	GK	GER	Abou Fofana
30	MF	GER	Jamel Gramberg
35	MF	GER	Mattis Schmittdiel
39	MF	POR	Gabriel Baldé
49	GK	GER	Juri Behr
77	MF	GER	Tom Politz
—	DF	GER	Erciyes Palo
—	MF	GER	Paul Weiß
—	MF	GER	Linus Ahrens
—	FW	GER	Finn Schmalfeld
—	FW	GER	Joseph Akugue
—	FW	GER	Alexander Georgiadi

== Departments ==
The club consists of various sports departments, these being:

- Archery
- Baseball
- Basketball
- Beach volleyball
- Boxing
- Canoeing
- Dancing
- Fencing
- Fistball
- Floorball
- Football
- Handball
- Hockey
- Inline skating
- Judo
- Karate
- Kickboxing
- Kung fu
- Swimming
- Table tennis
- Tennis
- Track and field
- Volleyball

== Honors ==
The club's honours:

=== Association Football ===
- Gauliga Nordmark (I)
  - Champions: 1934, 1935, 1936, 1940, 1942
- Stadtliga Hamburg (II)
  - Champions: 1948
- Amateurliga Hamburg (II)
  - Champions: 1959
- Landesliga Hamburg-Hansa (VI)
  - Champions: 1998
- Hamburg Cup
  - Winners: 2011
- Bezirksliga Hamburg-Nord (VII)
  - Champions: 2019

=== Fistball ===
- German champions (Men): 1928, 1929
- German champions (Women): 1934
