= Liam Omore =

Beninese footballer

Personal information
- Date of birth: 20 March 2003 (age 23)
- Place of birth: Konstanz, Germany
- Height: 1.86 m (6 ft 1 in)
- Position: Right-back

Team information
- Current team: Würzburger Kickers
- Number: 17

Youth career
- 2020–2022: SC Konstanz-Wollmatingen

Senior career*
Years	Team	Apps	(Gls)
2022–2023	SC Konstanz-Wollmatingen	0	(0)
2023–2025	FV Illertissen	47	(1)
2025–	Würzburger Kickers	17	(2)

International career^{‡}
2026–	Benin	1	(0)
- * Club domestic league appearances and goals as of 22:15, 6 June 2026 (UTC) ‡ National team caps and goals as of 22:15, 6 June 2026 (UTC)

Liam Omore (born 20 March 2003) is a Beninese footballer who plays as a right back for 3. Liga club FC Würzburger Kickers. Born in Germany, he plays for the Benin national team.

== Club career ==
Omore began his senior career at SC Konstanz-Wollmatingen before joining FV Illertissen in July 2023. Over two seasons in the Regionalliga Bayern he made 47 appearances, earning a reputation for his pace, work rate, and ability to contribute in both defensive and offensive phases of play.

In May 2025, Omore signed for FC Würzburger Kickers, moving from Illertissen to the Dallenberg. Würzburg sporting director Sebastian Neumann described him as an enormously talented player with significant development potential, adding that he brought everything the club wanted on the right side of defence — dynamism, aerial ability, and good instincts going forward.

== International career ==
Omore was born in Germany to a Beninese father and German mother. He received his first senior call-up to the Benin national football team for the June 2026 FIFA window, one of four uncapped players selected by coach Gernot Rohr as he refreshed his squad ahead of the 2027 AFCON qualifiers. He made his senior debut on 5 June 2026, appearing as a substitute in a 1–1 international friendly draw against Niger in Casablanca, Morocco.

== Honours ==
FV Illertissen

- Bavarian Cup: 2024–25

Würzburger Kickers

- Bavarian Cup: 2025–26
