= Thomas Amegnaglo =

Association football player

Personal information
- Full name: Yao Thomas Amegnaglo
- Date of birth: 31 October 1991 (age 35)
- Place of birth: Aflao, Ghana
- Height: 1.78 m (5 ft 10 in)
- Positions: Midfielder; defender

Team information
- Current team: Châtellerault

Senior career*
Years	Team	Apps	(Gls)
2011–2012	AS Douanes		
2012–2013	Chippa United	8	(0)
2015	Banbury United		
2015–2016	Vilanova		
2017–2018	Igualada	19	(0)
2019–2021	GOAL FC (Note: In 2020, Monts d'Or Azergues Foot merged with several smaller clubs to form GOAL FC.)	24	(2)
2021–2022	Hyères	4	(0)
2022	GOAL FC	2	(0)
2022–2023	Feurs	15	(0)
2023–	Châtellerault	27	(1)

International career
	Togo U20	3	(0)
- * Club domestic league appearances and goals as of 7 December 2024

Yao Thomas Amegnaglo (born 31 October 1991) is a professional footballer who plays as a midfielder and defender for French Championnat National 3 club Châtellerault. Born in Ghana, he is a former Togo youth international.

== Club career ==
In 2017, Amegnaglo was unable to sign for Irish club Finn Harps due to work permit issues.

== International career ==
Amegnaglo was a youth international for the under-20 team of Togo.

== Career statistics ==
As of 2 February 2022

Appearances and goals by club, season and competition
Club	Season	League			Cup		Other		Total	
Club	Season	Division	Apps	Goals	Apps	Goals	Apps	Goals	Apps	Goals
Chippa United	2012–13	Premier Soccer League	8	0	0	0	2 (Note: Appearances in PSL Playoff Tournament)	0	10	0
Igualada	2017–18	Primera Catalana	19	0	0	0	—		19	0
GOAL FC	2019–20	National 2	17	1	0	0	—		17	1
GOAL FC	2020–21	National 2	7	1	0	0	—		7	1
GOAL FC	Total		24	2	0	0	—		24	2
Hyères	2021–22	National 2	6	0	0	0	—		6	0
GOAL FC	2021–22	National 2	0	0	—		—		0	0
Career total			57	2	0	0	2	0	59	2
