= Blau-Weiß Lohne =

- Full name: Turn- und Sportverein Blau-Weiß Lohne von 1894 e. V.
- Founded: 1894
- Ground: Heinz-Dettmer-Stadion, Lohne
- Capacity: 6,000
- Chairman: Christian Tölke
- Manager: Uwe Möhrle
- League: Oberliga Niedersachsen (V)
- 2025–26: Regionalliga Nord, 17th of 18 (relegated)

Blau-Weiß Lohne is a football club based in Lohne, Lower Saxony. As of 2024, the club has over 4,000 members and offers multiple sports including basketball, gymnastics, martial arts, and swimming. The club's football team competes in the fourth tier Regionalliga Nord.

== History ==
Blau-Weiß Lohne was founded in 1894. The club won the amateur path of the 2021–22 Lower Saxony Cup against Heeslinger SC, qualifying them for the following year's DFB Pokal. In the same season, Lohne won promotion from the fifth-tier Oberliga Niedersachsen to the fourth-tier Regionalliga Nord with an 8–1 win over Arminia Hannover.

Lohne faced FC Augsburg in the first round of the 2022–23 DFB-Pokal and lost 4–0.

== Colours and badge ==
Blau-Weiß means "Blue-White" in German, and the clubs' colours are accordingly blue and white.

== Stadium ==
The club plays its home matches at Heinz-Dettmer-Stadion in Lohne. The first stand was constructed at the ground in 1983 and had a capacity of 600. The ground was renovated in 2013 and currently has a capacity of 6,000.

== Honours ==
Blau-Weiß Lohne honours
Honour	Year(s)
Oberliga Niedersachsen	2021–22
Lower Saxony Cup	2025

== Current squad ==
As of 6 February 2026

Note: Flags indicate national team as defined under FIFA eligibility rules; some limited exceptions apply. Players may hold more than one non-FIFA nationality.

No.	Pos.	Nation	Player
1	GK	SRB	Marko Đedović
3	DF	GER	Luke Schierenbeck
4	DF	GER	Luca Zander
5	DF	GER	Laurenz Pölking
6	DF	GER	Johannes Sabah
7	MF	GER	Roberto Sandu
8	MF	GER	Nico Thoben
10	MF	GER	Pelle Hoppe
11	DF	GER	Kai Westerhoff
14	FW	GER	Clinton Helmdach
16	MF	GER	Jakub Bürkle
17	MF	GER	Tom Kankowski
18	MF	GER	Martin Kobylański

No.	Pos.	Nation	Player
19	DF	GER	Leonard Bredol
20	FW	GER	Anton Wessels
21	FW	GER	Thorsten Tönnies
22	DF	GER	Tjark Reinert
23	MF	KOS	Rilind Neziri
24	GK	GER	Jakob Sieve
25	MF	GER	Niklas Tepe
27	FW	GER	Jannik Zahmel (on loan from MSV Duisburg)
28	MF	GER	Malte Wengerowski
29	FW	GER	Felix Schmiederer
33	DF	GER	Torben Rehfeldt
34	GK	GER	Pascal Kokott
