= SV Rödinghausen =

Association football club in Germany

- Full name: Sportverein Rödinghausen e. V.
- Founded: 1970; 56 years ago
- Ground: Häcker-Wiehenstadion
- Capacity: 3,140
- Manager: Fabian Lübbers
- League: Regionalliga West (IV)
- 2025–26: Regionalliga West, 14th of 18
Home colours	Away colours

SV Rödinghausen is a German association football club based in the town of Rödinghausen, North Rhine-Westphalia.

The club's greatest success has been to earn promotion to the tier four Regionalliga West in 2014.

== History ==
For most of its history the club has been an amateur side in local football. The club's fortunes changed in 2009 when, after having been playing in the tier nine Kreisliga A for a number of seasons the club began a series of five consecutive promotions. A Kreisliga championship in 2010 was followed by a Bezirksliga championship in 2011 and a Landesliga championship in 2012. The club's rapid rise was made possible by the financial support of Horst Finkemeier, the retired owner of a kitchen manufacturing business. Finkemeier also financed the club's new stadium, which is estimated to have cost €2 million and was officially opened in 2011. The stadium was first used, then still under construction, in a league match against SC Verl but has also seen the club play friendlies against Valencia, Werder Bremen and Aston Villa.

In 2013 SV won Group 1 of the Westfalenliga and thereby earned direct promotion to the Oberliga Westfalen. The following season the club won promotion to the tier four Regionalliga West for the first time after finishing runners-up in the Oberliga, behind the champions Arminia Bielefeld II, who were ineligible for promotion.

== Current squad ==
As of 8 September 2026

Note: Flags indicate national team as defined under FIFA eligibility rules; some limited exceptions apply. Players may hold more than one non-FIFA nationality.

No.	Pos.	Nation	Player
1	GK	GER	Tim Paterok
4	DF	GER	Fabian Rüth
5	DF	GER	Alexander Höck
6	DF	GER	Jeff Mensah
8	MF	GER	Mikail Polat
9	FW	GER	Cedric Euschen
10	MF	GER	Marius Bauer
11	MF	GER	Allan Firmino Dantas
13	DF	GER	Noah-Henry Köse
16	DF	GER	Manuel Reutter
17	MF	GER	Ben Klefisch
18	MF	GER	Tim Schleinitz
19	FW	GER	Cottrell Ezekwem

No.	Pos.	Nation	Player
20	DF	GER	Timon Kramer
21	FW	GER	Luis Frieling
22	FW	GER	Nicklas Burlage
23	DF	GER	Louis Hiepen
25	MF	GER	Mika Lehnfeld
26	FW	GER	Ansgar Kuhlmann
27	FW	GER	Lasse Zumdieck
31	DF	GER	Henri Weigelt
32	DF	GER	Maxim Gresler
33	GK	NED	Lukas van Ingen
38	GK	GER	Max Koch
42	MF	GER	Moritz Brasas
44	MF	GER	Fatlum Elezi

== Honours ==
The club's honours:

- Regionalliga West
  - Champions: 2020
- Oberliga Westfalen
  - Runners-up: 2014
- Westfalenliga
  - Champions: 2013
- Landesliga Westfalen-Ost
  - Champions: 2012
- Bezirksliga Westfalen 1
  - Champions: 2011
- Kreisliga A
  - Champions: 2010
- Westphalian Cup
  - 2019, 2022

== Recent seasons ==
The recent season-by-season performance of the club:

Season	Division	Tier	Position
2004–05	Kreisliga A	VIII	13th
2005–06	Kreisliga A	VIII	8th
2006–07	Kreisliga A	VIII	7th
2007–08	Kreisliga A	VIII	4th
2008–09	Kreisliga A	IX	5th
2009–10	Kreisliga A	IX	1st ↑
2010–11	Bezirksliga Westfalen 1	VIII	1st ↑
2011–12	Landesliga Westfalen-Ost	VII	1st ↑
2012–13	Westfalenliga 1	VI	1st ↑
2013–14	Oberliga Westfalen	V	2nd ↑
2014–15	Regionalliga West	IV	8th
2015–16	Regionalliga West	IV	14th
2016–17	Regionalliga West	IV	10th
2017–18	Regionalliga West	IV	5th
2018–19	Regionalliga West	IV	3rd
2019–20	Regionalliga West	IV	1st^{1}
2020–21	Regionalliga West	IV	6th
2021–22	Regionalliga West	IV	6th
2022–23	Regionalliga West	IV	4th
2023–24	Regionalliga West	IV	8th
2024–25	Regionalliga West	IV	5th
2025–26	Regionalliga West	IV	14th

- With the introduction of the Regionalligas in 1994 and the 3. Liga in 2008 as the new third tier, below the 2. Bundesliga, all leagues below dropped one tier.

^{1} Rödinghausen declined to be promoted to the 3. Liga.

=== Key ===
↑ Promoted	↓ Relegated
