= David Amegnaglo =

French footballer

Personal information
- Full name: David Nicolas Amegnaglo
- Date of birth: January 28, 2005 (age 21)
- Place of birth: Caen, France
- Height: 1.86 m (6 ft 1 in)
- Position: Winger

Team information
- Current team: Westerlo
- Number: 17

Youth career
- Bayern Munich
- 2019–2022: SpVgg Unterhaching
- 2022–2024: SC Freiburg

Senior career*
Years	Team	Apps	(Gls)
2024–2026	SC Freiburg II	57	(20)
2026–	Westerlo	1	(0)
- * Club domestic league appearances and goals as of 00:11, 14 August 2026 (UTC)

David Nicolas Amegnaglo (born 28 January 2005) is a French professional footballer who plays as a winger for Belgian Pro League club Westerlo.

== Club career ==
Born in France, Amegnaglo started his youth career with the youth academy of German giants Bayern Munich and then moved to SpVgg Unterhaching's academy, before moving to SC Freiburg's academy in 2022 to finish his development. He was promoted to Freiburg's reserves in the Regionalliga in July 2024.

On 1 July 2026, he transferred to Belgian Pro League club Westerlo. On 8 August 2026, he made his senior and professional debut with Westerlo as a substitute in a 5–1 loss to Union Saint-Gilloise.

== Personal life ==
Born in France and raised in Germany, Amegnaglo is of Togolese descent.
