= 2026–27 Oberliga =

Football tournament season in Germany

Oberliga
- Season: 2026–27

The 2026–27 season of the Oberliga will be the 19th season of the Oberligas, the fifth tier of the German football league system. The 5th tier of German football is composed of 14 regional groups since the 2012–13 season.

== Tables ==
=== Baden-Württemberg ===
The season is set to start on 8 August 2026 and should end on 22 May 2027. A winter break is set to happen between 6 December 2026 and 20 February 2027, however postponed games might be replayed starting on 13 February 2027.

At the beginning of the season, Bahlinger SC and TSG Balingen were relegated from the 2025–26 Regionalliga Südwest, whilst four teams were promoted from their respective sixth tier championship : 1. FC Mühlhausen (Verbandsliga Baden), FC Teningen (Verbandsliga Südbaden), Young Boys Reutlingen and FC Holzhausen (both Verbandsliga Württemberg).

Pos	Team	Pld	W	D	L	GF	GA	GD	Pts	Promotion, qualification or relegation
1	TSG Backnang 1919	16	11	4	1	41	20	+21	37	Promotion to Regionalliga Südwest
2	SV Oberachern	16	10	4	2	34	15	+19	34	Play-off
3	FC 08 Villingen	16	10	3	3	32	20	+12	33	
4	Bahlinger SC	16	9	5	2	28	16	+12	32	
5	SSV Reutlingen 05	16	9	4	3	27	18	+9	31	
6	Young Boys Reutlingen	16	7	5	4	31	23	+8	26	
7	Karlsruher SC II (Note: Reserve of a 2. Bundesliga club, ineligible for promotion if the main team is relegated to the 3. Liga.)	16	7	5	4	30	29	+1	26	
8	FV Ravensburg	16	6	5	5	29	19	+10	23	
9	TSG Balingen	16	6	4	6	22	21	+1	22	
10	1. FC Mühlhausen	16	6	4	6	31	34	−3	22	
11	FC Holzhausen	16	6	3	7	27	30	−3	21	
12	1. CfR Pforzheim	16	6	3	7	26	29	−3	21	
13	TSV Essingen	16	4	4	8	21	29	−8	16	Possible relegation
14	FC Nöttingen	16	5	0	11	35	29	+6	15	Possible relegation
15	Türkischer SV Singen	16	4	2	10	17	30	−13	14	Possible relegation
16	FC Teningen	16	4	1	11	26	43	−17	13	Relegation
17	Türkspor Neckarsulm	16	4	0	12	21	46	−25	12	Relegation
18	1. FC Normannia Gmünd	16	2	0	14	17	44	−27	6	Relegation

Updated to match(es) played on 15 November 2026. Source: Kicker, Soccerway

=== Bayern Nord ===
The season is started on 15 July 2026 and should end on 22 May 2027. A winter break is set to happen between 28 November 2026 and 5 March 2027.

At the beginning of the season, Viktoria Aschaffenburg was relegated from the 2025–26 Regionalliga Bayern, TSV 1861 Nördlingen was transferred from the Bayern Süd group to the Bayern Nord group, whilst three teams were promoted from their respective Landesliga Bayern group : DJK Don Bosco Bamberg, TSV Großbardorf (both Nordwest) and DJK Ammerthal (Nordost).

- If two teams have the same number of points, direct confrontation is the first differentiating factor, followed by away goals.

Pos	Team	Pld	W	D	L	GF	GA	GD	Pts	Promotion, qualification or relegation
1	ASV Cham	19	16	1	2	46	13	+33	49	Promotion to Regionalliga Bayern
2	TSV Kornburg	18	10	6	2	34	14	+20	36	Play-off
3	Würzburger FV	19	10	6	3	38	24	+14	36	
4	Jahn Regensburg II (Note: Reserve of a 3. Liga club, only eligible for promotion if the main team is promoted to the 2. Bundesliga.)	19	9	6	4	45	28	+17	33	
5	SpVgg Bayern Hof	19	9	5	5	41	35	+6	32	
6	FC Eintracht Bamberg	18	8	5	5	33	23	+10	29	
7	Fortuna Regensburg	19	8	4	7	38	29	+9	28	
8	DJK Gebenbach	19	8	4	7	31	32	−1	28	
9	Viktoria Aschaffenburg	19	6	6	7	29	29	0	24	
10	FSV Stadeln	19	6	6	7	24	31	−7	24	
11	TSV Großbardorf	19	7	2	10	29	35	−6	23	
12	TSV Neudrossenfeld	19	7	2	10	27	31	−4	23	
13	FC Ingolstadt 04 II	19	6	4	9	32	40	−8	22	
14	SpVgg SV Weiden	19	4	7	8	31	41	−10	19	Possible relegation play-off
15	DJK Don Bosco Bamberg	19	4	6	9	21	35	−14	18	Relegation play-offs
16	DJK Ammerthal	19	5	3	11	24	38	−14	18	Relegation play-offs
17	TSV 1861 Nördlingen	19	4	5	10	21	41	−20	17	Relegation play-offs
18	ASV Neumarkt	19	2	4	13	16	41	−25	10	Relegation

Updated to match(es) played on 14 November 2026. Source: Kicker, Soccerway

=== Bayern Süd ===
The season is started on 16 July 2026 and should end on 22 May 2027. A winter break is set to happen between 28 November 2026 and 5 March 2027.

At the beginning of the season, SpVgg Hankofen-Hailing was relegated from the 2025–26 Regionalliga Bayern, whilst five teams were promoted from their respective Landesliga Bayern group : SpVgg Landshut (Mitte), TSV Schwabmünchen, FSV Pfaffenhofen (both Südwest), TSV 1860 Rosenheim and TSV 1880 Wasserburg (both Südost).

- If two teams have the same number of points, direct confrontation is the first differentiating factor, followed by away goals.

Pos	Team	Pld	W	D	L	GF	GA	GD	Pts	Promotion, qualification or relegation
1	SV Erlbach	19	11	6	2	33	12	+21	39	Promotion to Regionalliga Bayern
2	FC Pipinsried	19	11	5	3	48	25	+23	38	Play-off
3	TSV 1880 Wasserburg	18	12	1	5	40	25	+15	37	
4	SpVgg Landshut	19	10	4	5	36	24	+12	34	
5	FSV Pfaffenhofen	19	9	6	4	36	35	+1	33	
6	FC Ismaning	19	9	3	7	41	29	+12	30	
7	SpVgg Hankofen-Hailing	19	8	6	5	31	26	+5	30	
8	FC Sportfreunde Schwaig	19	6	9	4	35	24	+11	27	
9	SV Heimstetten	19	6	8	5	35	33	+2	26	
10	TSV Kottern	19	6	7	6	20	22	−2	25	
11	TSV 1860 Munich II (Note: Reserve of a Regionalliga club, ineligible for promotion.)	19	5	8	6	37	37	0	23	
12	TSV Schwabmünchen	19	5	6	8	33	36	−3	21	
13	TSV 1860 Rosenheim	19	5	6	8	25	32	−7	21	
14	FC Deisenhofen	19	5	4	10	25	40	−15	19	Possible relegation play-off
15	SV Kirchanschöring	19	5	4	10	22	38	−16	19	Relegation play-offs
16	FC Gundelfingen	18	4	5	9	23	31	−8	17	Relegation play-offs
17	TuS Geretsried	19	3	4	12	19	39	−20	13	Relegation play-offs
18	SV Schalding-Heining	19	2	4	13	19	50	−31	10	Relegation

Updated to match(es) played on 14 November 2026. Source: Kicker, Soccerway

=== Bremen ===
The season is set to start on 7 August 2026 and should end on 23 May 2027. A winter break is set to happen between 13 December 2026 and 12 February 2027, however postponed games might be replayed starting on 29 January 2027.

At the beginning of the season, two teams were promoted from the 2025–26 Landesliga Bremen : TuS Schwachhausen and SV Grohn.

Pos	Team	Pld	W	D	L	GF	GA	GD	Pts	Qualification or relegation
1	SV Hemelingen	14	13	1	0	55	4	+51	40	Play-off
2	Brinkumer SV	14	11	1	2	42	16	+26	34	
3	OSC Bremerhaven	14	10	2	2	49	12	+37	32	
4	Blumenthaler SV	14	10	0	4	45	17	+28	30	
5	ESC Geestemünde	14	7	3	4	36	32	+4	24	
6	Leher Turnerschaft	14	6	3	5	34	21	+13	21	
7	SG Aumund-Vegesack	14	6	2	6	35	31	+4	20	
8	Vatan Sport Bremen	14	6	2	6	31	34	−3	20	
9	Bremer TS Neustadt	14	6	0	8	27	40	−13	18	
10	FC Union 60 Bremen	14	4	5	5	28	29	−1	17	
11	TV Eiche Horn	14	4	3	7	18	32	−14	15	
12	TuS Schwachhausen	14	4	2	8	19	35	−16	14	
13	SV Grohn	14	4	2	8	22	46	−24	14	Possible relegation
14	Werder Bremen III (Note: Second reserve, with the first reserve being in the Regionalliga. If the first reserve is relegated, the second reserve will follow suit regardless of sportive results.)	14	2	3	9	23	42	−19	9	Possible relegation
15	TS Woltmershausen	14	1	3	10	17	50	−33	6	Relegation
16	FC Oberneuland	14	1	2	11	14	54	−40	5	Relegation

Updated to match(es) played on 15 November 2026. Source: Kicker, Soccerway

=== Hamburg ===
The season is set to start on 24 July 2026 and should end on 23 May 2027. A winter break is set to happen between 6 December 2026 and 29 January 2027, however postponed games might be replayed until 13 December 2026 and starting on 22 January 2027.

At the beginning of the season, Altona 93 was relegated from the 2025–26 Regionalliga Nord, whilst three teams were promoted from their respective Landesliga Hamburg group : Eintracht Norderstedt II, TBS Pinneberg (both Gr. 01) and Wandsbeker TSV Concordia (Gr. 02).

Pos	Team	Pld	W	D	L	GF	GA	GD	Pts	Qualification or relegation
1	USC Paloma	16	12	2	2	45	26	+19	38	Play-off
2	Niendorfer TSV	16	10	2	4	43	35	+8	32	
3	Victoria Hamburg	16	8	6	2	38	24	+14	30	
4	TuS Dassendorf	14	9	2	3	38	18	+20	29	
5	HT 16 Hamburg	16	9	2	5	42	24	+18	29	
6	Altona 93	15	8	4	3	39	32	+7	28	
7	SC Vorwärts-Wacker 04	16	8	4	4	39	32	+7	28	
8	TSV Sasel	16	7	3	6	27	27	0	24	
9	TBS Pinneberg	15	7	2	6	35	28	+7	23	
10	FC Süderelbe	15	6	3	6	29	23	+6	21	
11	ETSV Hamburg	14	6	2	6	36	34	+2	20	
12	HEBC Hamburg	16	6	0	10	21	27	−6	18	
13	FC Teutonia Ottensen	15	4	4	7	28	38	−10	16	
14	TSV Buchholz 08	16	4	4	8	38	57	−19	16	
15	Wandsbeker TSV Concordia	16	4	2	10	27	47	−20	14	
16	SSG Nikola Tesla	15	3	2	10	25	31	−6	11	Possible relegation
17	TuRa Harksheide	15	1	5	9	17	34	−17	8	Relegation
18	Eintracht Norderstedt II (Note: Reserve of a Regionalliga club, ineligible for promotion.)	16	2	1	13	22	52	−30	7	Relegation

Updated to match(es) played on 15 November 2026. Source: Kicker, Soccerway

=== Hessen ===
The season is set to start on 2 August 2026 and should end on 23 May 2027. A winter break is set to happen between 6 December 2026 and 28 February 2027.

At the beginning of the season, Bayern Alzenau was relegated from the 2025–26 Regionalliga Südwest, whilst three teams were promoted from their respective Verbandsliga Hessen group : KSV Hessen Kassel II (Nord), SV Rot-Weiß Hadamar (Mitte) and SV Unter-Flockenbach (Süd).

- If two teams have the same number of points, direct confrontation is the first differentiating factor, followed by away goals.

Pos	Team	Pld	W	D	L	GF	GA	GD	Pts	Promotion, qualification or relegation
1	TSV Eintracht Stadtallendorf	18	13	3	2	51	12	+39	42	Promotion to Regionalliga Südwest
2	SV Unter-Flockenbach	18	12	2	4	48	27	+21	38	Play-off
3	Türk Gücü Friedberg	18	10	3	5	41	27	+14	33	
4	SV Rot-Weiß Hadamar	18	9	4	5	37	31	+6	31	
5	FC TuBa Pohlheim	18	9	2	7	26	25	+1	29	
6	FSV 1926 Fernwald	18	6	10	2	26	20	+6	28	
7	Bayern Alzenau	18	8	4	6	26	24	+2	28	
8	SV Darmstadt 98 II (Note: Reserve of a 2. Bundesliga club, ineligible for promotion if the main team is relegated to the 3. Liga.)	17	8	3	6	35	19	+16	27	
9	FC Eddersheim	17	7	4	6	33	34	−1	25	
10	VfB Marburg	18	7	3	8	23	27	−4	24	
11	CSC 03 Kassel	18	6	5	7	21	33	−12	23	
12	Hünfelder SV	18	7	2	9	24	29	−5	23	Possible relegation play-off
13	SC 1960 Hanau	18	6	4	8	29	37	−8	22	Relegation play-off
14	Rot-Weiß Walldorf	18	6	3	9	26	35	−9	21	Relegation play-off
15	KSV Baunatal	18	5	4	9	21	29	−8	19	Relegation play-off
16	SV Hummetroth	18	3	5	10	23	38	−15	14	Relegation
17	KSV Hessen Kassel II (Note: Reserve of a Regionalliga club, ineligible for promotion.)	18	3	3	12	17	36	−19	12	Relegation
18	FC Gießen	18	2	4	12	23	47	−24	10	Relegation

Updated to match(es) played on 15 November 2026. Source: Kicker, Soccerway

=== Mittelrhein ===
The season is set to start on 29 August 2026 and should end on 13 June 2027. A winter break is set to happen between 20 December 2026 and 12 February 2027, however postponed games might be replayed until 17 December 2026 and starting on 26 January 2027.

At the beginning of the season, four teams were promoted from their respective Landesliga Mittelrhein group : FSV Neunkirchen-Seelscheid, Borussia Lindenthal-Hohenlind (both Gr. 1), TuS Chlodwig Zülpich and FC Hürth (both Gr. 2).

Pos	Team	Pld	W	D	L	GF	GA	GD	Pts	Promotion or relegation
1	SSV Merten	11	8	1	2	32	12	+20	25	Promotion to Regionalliga West
2	FC Wegberg-Beeck	11	8	1	2	22	10	+12	25	
3	SC Fortuna Köln II (Note: Reserve of a 3. Liga club, only eligible for promotion if the main team is promoted to the 2. Bundesliga.)	11	7	1	3	30	17	+13	22	
4	SpVg Frechen	11	6	2	3	26	20	+6	20	
5	1. FC Düren	11	6	1	4	24	20	+4	19	
6	VfL 08 Vichttal	11	5	3	3	32	20	+12	18	
7	SV Eintracht Hohkeppel	11	5	3	3	30	23	+7	18	
8	Borussia Lindenthal-Hohenlind	11	5	3	3	23	22	+1	18	
9	Siegburger SV 04	11	4	3	4	21	21	0	15	
10	SSV Bornheim	11	5	0	6	24	26	−2	15	
11	TuS Chlodwig Zülpich	11	4	1	6	27	33	−6	13	
12	FC Hennef 05	11	4	1	6	13	20	−7	13	
13	FC Hürth	11	2	4	5	11	19	−8	10	
14	FSV Neunkirchen-Seelscheid	11	2	2	7	13	22	−9	8	Relegation
15	TuS Königsdorf	11	2	0	9	16	47	−31	6	Relegation
16	SpVg Porz 1919	11	1	2	8	12	24	−12	5	Relegation

Updated to match(es) played on 15 November 2026. Source: Kicker, Soccerway

=== Niederrhein ===
The season is set to start on 14 August 2026 and should end on 13 June 2027. A winter break is set to happen between 20 December 2026 and 12 February 2027, however postponed games might be replayed starting on 23 January 2027.

At the beginning of the season, Fortuna Düsseldorf II, Wuppertaler SV and SSVg Velbert 02 were relegated from the 2025–26 Regionalliga West, whilst two teams were promoted from their respective Landesliga Niederrhein group : Solingen 03 (Gr. 1) and SV Scherpenberg (Gr. 2).

Pos	Team	Pld	W	D	L	GF	GA	GD	Pts	Promotion or relegation
1	SpVg Schonnebeck	13	11	2	0	49	17	+32	35	Promotion to Regionalliga West
2	SSVg Velbert	13	9	1	3	35	23	+12	28	
3	Fortuna Düsseldorf II (Note: Reserve of a 3. Liga club, only eligible for promotion if the main team is promoted to the 2. Bundesliga.)	13	8	3	2	29	13	+16	27	
4	SC St. Tönis	13	7	3	3	23	16	+7	24	
5	1. FC Monheim	13	5	5	3	25	18	+7	20	
6	Wuppertaler SV	13	6	1	6	22	15	+7	19	
7	SV Sonsbeck	13	5	4	4	25	23	+2	19	
8	Sportfreunde Baumberg	13	5	4	4	24	23	+1	19	
9	VfL Jüchen-Garzweiler	13	5	4	4	26	26	0	19	
10	SV Blau-Weiß Dingden	13	6	1	6	17	19	−2	19	
11	Ratingen 04/19	12	4	6	2	25	21	+4	18	
12	KFC Uerdingen 05	13	5	2	6	24	17	+7	17	
13	Solingen 03	12	5	1	6	24	29	−5	16	
14	SV Scherpenberg	13	4	2	7	18	27	−9	14	
15	Schwarz-Weiß Essen	13	2	3	8	15	27	−12	9	Possible relegation
16	FC Büderich	13	1	4	8	12	37	−25	7	Relegation
17	Holzheimer SG	13	2	1	10	15	41	−26	7	Relegation
18	TSV Meerbusch	13	1	3	9	16	32	−16	6	Relegation

Updated to match(es) played on 15 November 2026. Source: Kicker, Soccerway

=== Niedersachsen ===
The season is set to start on 7 August 2026 and should end on 23 May 2027. A winter break is set to happen between 6 December 2026 and 20 February 2027, however postponed games might be replayed starting on 7 February 2027.

At the beginning of the season, Blau-Weiß Lohne was relegated from the 2025–26 Regionalliga Nord, whilst four teams were promoted from their respective Landesliga Niedersachsen group : SSV Vorsfelde (Braunschweig), SC Hemmingen-Westerfeld (Hannover), SV Drochtersen/Assel II (Lüneburg) and SV Vorwärts Nordhorn (Weser-Ems).

Pos	Team	Pld	W	D	L	GF	GA	GD	Pts	Promotion, qualification or relegation
1	SV Wilhelmshaven	14	10	3	1	28	11	+17	33	Promotion to Regionalliga Nord
2	SC Spelle-Venhaus	15	9	4	2	35	16	+19	31	Play-off
3	Eintracht Braunschweig II (Note: Reserve of a 2. Bundesliga club, ineligible for promotion if the main team is relegated to the 3. Liga.)	15	9	2	4	42	24	+18	29	
4	Heeslinger SC	15	7	5	3	35	18	+17	26	
5	Blau-Weiß Lohne	14	7	4	3	31	19	+12	25	
6	BSV Schwarz-Weiß Rehden	13	7	3	3	25	20	+5	24	
7	VfV 06 Hildesheim	14	7	3	4	21	16	+5	24	
8	SV Meppen II (Note: Reserve of a 3. Liga club, only eligible for promotion if the main team is promoted to the 2. Bundesliga.)	15	6	3	6	31	32	−1	21	
9	SV Vorwärts Nordhorn	15	4	6	5	22	33	−11	18	
10	FC Verden 04	15	4	5	6	23	21	+2	17	
11	TuS Bersenbrück	15	5	1	9	22	32	−10	16	
12	Lüneburger SK Hansa	14	2	7	5	19	20	−1	13	Possible relegation
13	SV Drochtersen/Assel II (Note: Reserve of a Regionalliga club, ineligible for promotion.)	15	3	3	9	18	29	−11	12	Possible relegation
14	1. FC Germania Egestorf/Langreder	14	2	6	6	17	29	−12	12	Possible relegation
15	SC Hemmingen-Westerfeld	15	2	3	10	17	42	−25	9	Relegation
16	SSV Vorsfelde	14	2	2	10	11	35	−24	8	Relegation

Updated to match(es) played on 15 November 2026. Source: Kicker, Soccerway

=== Nordost-Nord ===
The season is set to start on 7 August 2026 and should end on 23 May 2027. A winter break is set to happen between 18 December 2026 and 7 February 2027, however postponed games might be replayed starting on 15 January 2027.

At the beginning of the season, Hertha Zehlendorf was relegated from the 2025–26 Regionalliga Nordost, 1. FC Lok Stendal was transferred from the Nordost Süd group to the Nordost Nord group, whilst two teams were promoted from their respective sixth tier championship : FC Mecklenburg Schwerin (Verbandsliga Mecklenburg-Vorpommern) and Füchse Berlin Reinickendorf (Berlin-Liga).

Pos	Team	Pld	W	D	L	GF	GA	GD	Pts	Promotion or relegation
1	Eintracht Mahlsdorf	11	8	1	2	21	8	+13	25	Promotion to Regionalliga Nordost
2	Berliner AK 07	11	6	4	1	18	11	+7	22	
3	Hertha Zehlendorf	11	6	1	4	20	9	+11	19	
4	FSV Optik Rathenow	11	6	1	4	18	11	+7	19	
5	Füchse Berlin Reinickendorf	11	5	3	3	15	12	+3	18	
6	FC Anker Wismar	11	5	1	5	13	21	−8	16	
7	SV Siedenbollentin	11	4	3	4	13	10	+3	15	
8	SV Sparta Lichtenberg	11	4	3	4	17	16	+1	15	
9	SV Lichtenberg 47	11	4	3	4	15	16	−1	15	
10	Hansa Rostock II (Note: Reserve of a 2. Bundesliga club, ineligible for promotion if the main team is relegated to the 3. Liga.)	11	3	5	3	22	15	+7	14	
11	FC Mecklenburg Schwerin	11	3	5	3	15	16	−1	14	
12	Tennis Borussia Berlin	11	3	3	5	10	14	−4	12	
13	SG Union Klosterfelde	11	2	5	4	10	16	−6	11	
14	TSG Neustrelitz	11	3	1	7	14	21	−7	10	Possible relegation
15	1. FC Lok Stendal	11	2	3	6	13	22	−9	9	Relegation
16	TuS Makkabi Berlin	11	2	2	7	6	22	−16	8	Relegation

Updated to match(es) played on 8 November 2026. Source: Kicker, Soccerway

=== Nordost-Süd ===
The season is set to start on 7 August 2026 and should end on 23 May 2027. A winter break is set to happen between 18 December 2026 and 7 February 2027, however postponed games might be replayed starting on 15 January 2027.

At the beginning of the season, ZFC Meuselwitz and FC Eilenburg were relegated from the 2025–26 Regionalliga Nordost, whilst three teams were promoted from their respective sixth tier championship : 1. FC Frankfurt (Brandenburgliga), SSC Weißenfels (Verbandsliga Sachsen-Anhalt) and Dynamo Dresden II (Sachsenliga).

Pos	Team	Pld	W	D	L	GF	GA	GD	Pts	Promotion or relegation
1	VfB Auerbach	11	8	2	1	28	10	+18	26	Promotion to Regionalliga Nordost
2	VfB Germania Halberstadt	11	8	1	2	30	12	+18	25	
3	ZFC Meuselwitz	11	7	3	1	24	13	+11	24	
4	VfL Halle 1896	11	8	0	3	26	18	+8	24	
5	FC Eilenburg	11	6	1	4	30	17	+13	19	
6	SC Freital	11	4	5	2	22	18	+4	17	
7	VFC Plauen	11	4	4	3	23	14	+9	16	
8	Dynamo Dresden II (Note: Reserve of a 2. Bundesliga club, ineligible for promotion if the main team is relegated to the 3. Liga.)	11	3	6	2	20	14	+6	15	
9	SSC Weißenfels	11	5	0	6	19	21	−2	15	
10	VfB Krieschow	12	4	2	6	17	27	−10	14	
11	SG Union Sandersdorf	12	3	2	7	25	26	−1	11	
12	FC Einheit Wernigerode	11	2	5	4	19	27	−8	11	
13	VfB Empor Glauchau	11	2	3	6	12	20	−8	9	
14	FSV Budissa Bautzen	11	2	3	6	15	26	−11	9	Possible relegation
15	FC Einheit Rudolstadt	11	1	3	7	10	31	−21	6	Relegation
16	1. FC Frankfurt	11	2	0	9	13	39	−26	6	Relegation

Updated to match(es) played on 14 November 2026. Source: Kicker, Soccerway

=== Rheinland-Pfalz/Saar ===
The season is set to start on 1 August 2026 and should end on 23 May 2027. A winter break is set to happen between 6 December 2026 and 27 February 2027, however postponed games might be replayed until 13 December 2026 and starting on 13 February 2027.

At the beginning of the season, TSV Schott Mainz was relegated from the 2025–26 Regionalliga Südwest, whilst four teams were promoted from their respective sixth tier championship : Ahrweiler BC, SV Rot-Weiss Wittlich (both Rheinlandliga), SV 07 Elversberg II (Saarlandliga) and TuS Mechtersheim (Verbandsliga Südwest).

Pos	Team	Pld	W	D	L	GF	GA	GD	Pts	Qualification
1	TSV Schott Mainz	17	11	5	1	47	16	+31	38	Promotion to Regionalliga Südwest
2	TuS Mechtersheim	17	12	1	4	43	25	+18	37	Play-off
3	SV Gonsenheim	17	11	1	5	37	20	+17	34	
4	FK Pirmasens	17	10	3	4	47	25	+22	33	
5	Rot-Weiß Koblenz	17	9	5	3	31	20	+11	32	
6	SV Rot-Weiss Wittlich	17	9	3	5	41	27	+14	30	
7	Wormatia Worms	17	8	3	6	43	31	+12	27	
8	TSV Gau-Odernheim	17	8	2	7	30	23	+7	26	
9	FV Engers 07	16	7	4	5	37	29	+8	25	
10	TuS Koblenz	16	7	4	5	26	21	+5	25	
11	FC Emmelshausen-Karbach	17	6	4	7	28	38	−10	22	
12	SV 07 Elversberg II	17	5	4	8	25	34	−9	19	
13	FC Hertha Wiesbach	17	5	3	9	26	39	−13	18	Possible relegation
14	FC Cosmos Koblenz	17	5	2	10	25	32	−7	17	Possible relegation
15	SV Auersmacher	17	5	1	11	24	44	−20	16	Possible relegation
16	FV 07 Diefflen	17	3	5	9	24	52	−28	14	Possible relegation
17	Ahrweiler BC	17	2	6	9	14	27	−13	12	Relegation
18	Eisbachtaler Sportfreunde	17	0	2	15	8	53	−45	2	Relegation

Updated to match(es) played on 15 November 2026. Source: Kicker, Soccerway

=== Schleswig-Holstein ===
The season is set to start on 31 July 2026 and should end on 23 May 2027. A winter break is set to happen between 6 December 2026 and 6 March 2027, however postponed games might be replayed and starting on 19 February 2027.

At the beginning of the season, four teams were promoted from their respective Landesliga Schleswig-Holstein group : SC Rapid Lübeck, VfB Lübeck II (both Holstein), Eckernförder SV and TSB Flensburg (both Schleswig).

Pos	Team	Pld	W	D	L	GF	GA	GD	Pts	Qualification or relegation
1	FC Kilia Kiel	17	13	2	2	67	26	+41	41	Play-off
2	Holstein Kiel II (Note: Reserve of a 2. Bundesliga club, ineligible for promotion if the main team is relegated to the 3. Liga.)	16	11	2	3	57	23	+34	35	
3	VfR Neumünster	17	10	4	3	41	31	+10	34	
4	TuS Rotenhof	17	7	7	3	35	33	+2	28	
5	TSB Flensburg	17	8	3	6	41	25	+16	27	
6	Heider SV	17	8	3	6	32	36	−4	27	
7	Oldenburger SV	17	7	4	6	43	35	+8	25	
8	SV Eichede	16	6	5	5	34	26	+8	23	
9	PSV Union Neumünster	16	6	4	6	39	29	+10	22	
10	SC Rapid Lübeck	17	7	1	9	35	58	−23	22	
11	Eckernförder SV	17	6	2	9	28	43	−15	20	Possible relegation
12	1. FC Phönix Lübeck II (Note: Reserve of a Regionalliga club, ineligible for promotion.)	17	4	6	7	35	42	−7	18	Possible relegation
13	Kaltenkirchener TS	17	4	3	10	27	48	−21	15	Possible relegation
14	TSV Nordmark Satrup	16	3	4	9	17	33	−16	13	Relegation
15	MTSV Hohenwestedt	17	3	5	9	30	46	−16	12 (Note: MTSV Hohenwestedt were deducted two points for failing to meet referee obligations.)	Relegation
16	VfB Lübeck II	17	3	1	13	21	48	−27	10	Relegation

Updated to match(es) played on 15 November 2026. Source: Kicker, Soccerway

=== Westfalen ===
The season is set to start on 9 August 2026 and should end on 30 May 2027. A winter break is set to happen between 13 December 2026 and 14 February 2027, however postponed games might be replayed and starting on 6 February 2027.

At the beginning of the season, four teams were promoted from their respective Westfalenliga group : Rot-Weiß Maaslingen, SC Westfalia Kinderhaus (both Gr. 1), DJK TuS Hordel and SpVgg Horsthausen (both Gr. 2).

Pos	Team	Pld	W	D	L	GF	GA	GD	Pts	Promotion, qualification or relegation
1	1. FC Gievenbeck	13	9	2	2	33	17	+16	29	Promotion to Regionalliga West
2	Rot-Weiß Maaslingen	14	9	1	4	28	18	+10	28	Promotion to Regionalliga West
3	Arminia Bielefeld II (Note: Reserve of a 2. Bundesliga club, ineligible for promotion if the main team is relegated to the 3. Liga.)	14	8	3	3	28	18	+10	27	
4	SpVgg Vreden	14	7	4	3	32	26	+6	25	
5	FC Eintracht Rheine	13	7	3	3	29	19	+10	24	
6	SC Preußen Münster II (Note: Reserve of a 3. Liga club, only eligible for promotion if the main team is promoted to the 2. Bundesliga.)	14	6	4	4	23	19	+4	22	
7	TSG Sprockhövel	14	6	3	5	28	21	+7	21	
8	SC Westfalia Kinderhaus	13	6	3	4	17	17	0	21	
9	SV Lippstadt 08	14	6	3	5	21	22	−1	21	
10	ASC 09 Dortmund	13	6	2	5	28	23	+5	20	
11	SpVgg Erkenschwick	14	5	5	4	19	16	+3	20	
12	SC Verl II	14	5	2	7	26	24	+2	17	
13	TuS Hiltrup	14	5	1	8	15	26	−11	16	
14	TuS Ennepetal	14	3	5	6	17	29	−12	14	
15	DJK TuS Hordel	14	2	7	5	19	26	−7	13	Possible relegation
16	SpVgg Horsthausen	14	4	1	9	24	40	−16	13	Possible relegation
17	TSV Victoria Clarholz	14	2	3	9	24	33	−9	9	Relegation
18	SV Schermbeck 2020	14	1	2	11	14	31	−17	5	Relegation

Updated to match(es) played on 15 November 2026. Source: Kicker, Soccerway
