= Oberliga Nord =

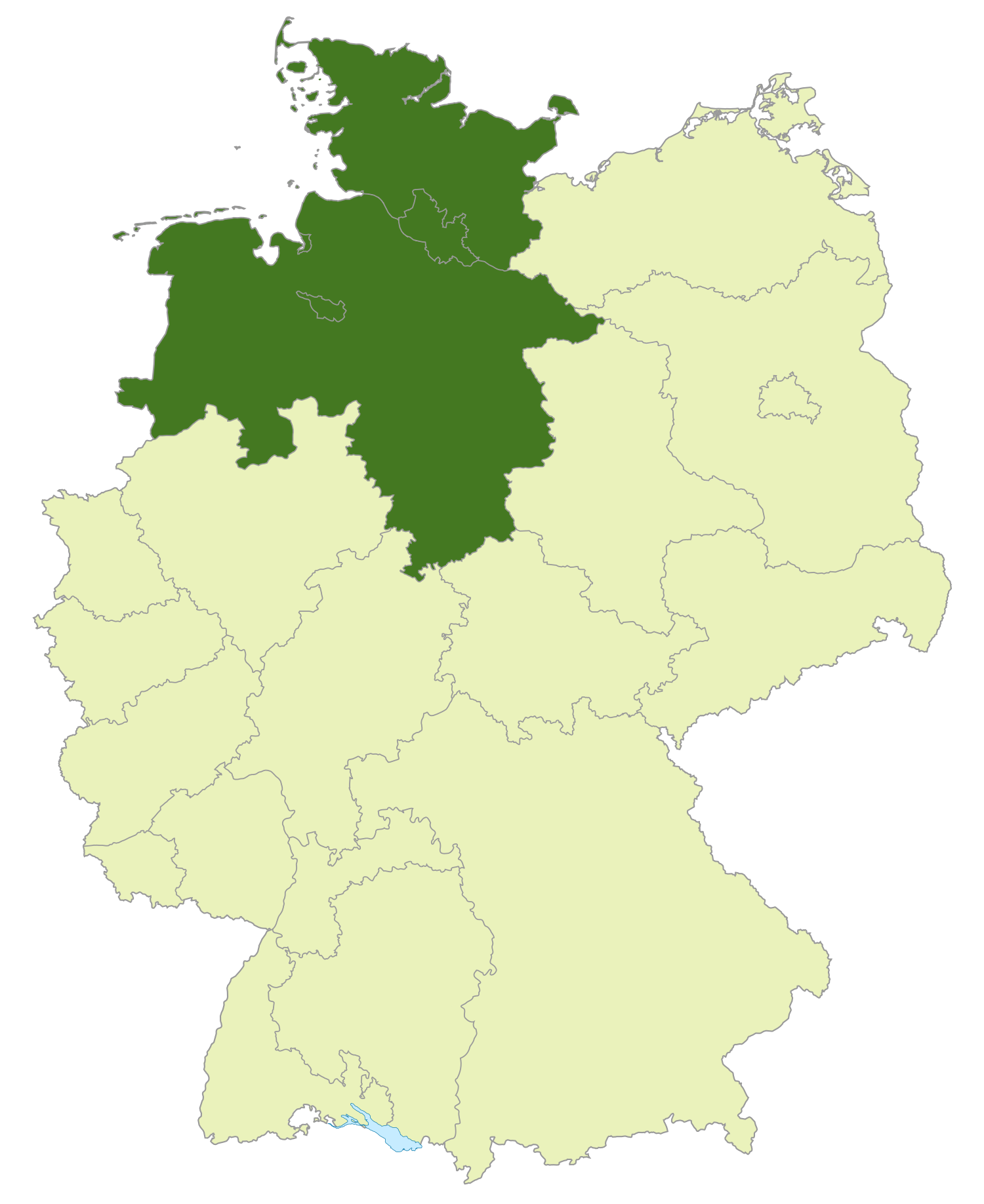
- Founded: 1974
- Folded: 2008 (24 seasons)
- Replaced by: Verbandsliga Hamburg; Verbandsliga Bremen; Verbandsliga Niedersachsen-Ost; Verbandsliga Niedersachsen-West; Verbandsliga Schleswig-Holstein
- Country: Germany
- States: Lower Saxony; Schleswig-Holstein; Bremen; Hamburg
- Level on pyramid: Level 4
- Promotion to: Regionalliga Nord
- Relegation to: Verbandsliga Hamburg; Verbandsliga Bremen; Verbandsliga Niedersachsen-Ost; Verbandsliga Niedersachsen-West; Verbandsliga Schleswig-Holstein
- Last champions: Holstein Kiel (2007–08)

The Oberliga Nord was the fourth tier of the German football league system in the north of Germany. It covered the states of Lower Saxony, Bremen, Hamburg and Schleswig-Holstein. With the introduction of the 3. Liga, the league ceased to exist from 2008.

== Overview ==
=== The first Oberliga Nord: 1947–1963 ===
The original league of this name existed from 1947 to 1963 and was then the first tier of German football, covering the same region as the "new" Oberliga Nord. For its history, see here.

=== The second Oberliga Nord: 1974–1994 ===
The league was formed in 1974 as a continuation of the Regionalliga Nord, the then second tier of German football. With the introduction of the 2nd Bundesliga Nord in that year, the Regionalliga was disbanded and its clubs spread among the new 2nd Bundesliga, Oberliga and Amateurligas.

The new Oberliga Nord however was only the third tier of the German football league system, replacing at this level the four Landes- and Amateurligas of Niedersachsen, Hamburg, Bremen and Schleswig-Holstein, who now slipped to the fourth tier of the league system.

Below the Oberliga were originally four leagues, one for each of the four states of the region. The Amateurliga of Niedersachsen changed its name to Landesliga from 1974 and after 1979 to Verbandsliga. The leagues in Bremen and Hamburg changed their name to Verbandsliga straight away in 1974. Schleswig-Holstein changed from Landesliga to Verbandsliga in 1978. In 1994, Niedersachsen, the largest of the four states, split its league into an eastern and a western group, a system already in place until 1964.

Due to the difference in playing strength of the Verbandsligas, champions were not directly promoted but had to go through a play-off system. Eight teams in two divisions were qualified for this competition, with three clubs from Niedersachsen, two each from Hamburg and Schleswig-Holstein and one from Bremen, to balance out the difference between the leagues.

In 1975 and 1976, the two first placed teams of the Oberliga took part in the promotion play-off to determine the promoted teams to the 2nd Bundesliga Nord. In 1977 and 1978, the top four teams from the Oberliga Nord went to this competition. With the reduction of the number of Oberligas in 1978, the winner and runners-up of the Oberliga Nord were directly promoted in 1979 and 1980.

No promotion was available in 1981 because the 2nd Bundesliga was reduced to one league only. From 1982, the top two teams in the league had to play-off for promotion again.

The Oberliga Nord was disbanded in 1994, with the re-introduction of the Regionalliga Nord, this time as the third tier of German football. Fourteen of its sixteen clubs went to the new Regionalliga, the bottom two teams were relegated to the two new Oberligas of Hamburg/Schleswig-Holstein and Niedersachsen/Bremen.

=== The third Oberliga Nord: 2004–2008 ===
In 2004, after ten seasons, the Oberliga Nord was reformed, as the league below the Regionalliga Nord, being the fourth tier of football now. The two Oberligas that replaced it in 1994 were disbanded.

With the introduction of the 3. Liga and of a third Regionalliga in 2008, the Oberliga Nord again ceased to exist, being replaced by the five Verbandsligas in its stead. The top five clubs of the Oberliga in the 2007-08 season gained promotion to the Regionalliga Nord, the sixth placed team had to play-off with the Verbandsliga champions for another Regionalliga spot and the rest of the clubs were relegated to the Verbandsligas. The northern region therefore became the only region in Germany without an Oberliga after 2008. In future, the five Verbandsliga champions will have to play-off for two promotion spots to the Regionalliga Nord.

== Champions of the Oberliga Nord ==
The league champions:

Season	Club
1974–75	VfB Oldenburg
1975–76	Arminia Hannover
1976–77	TuS Bremerhaven 93
1977–78	OSV Hannover
1978–79	OSV Hannover
1979–80	VfB Oldenburg
1980–81	FC St. Pauli
1981–82	SV Werder Bremen II
1982–83	FC St. Pauli
1983–84	SV Werder Bremen II
1984–85	VfL Osnabrück
1985–86	FC St. Pauli
1986–87	SV Meppen
1987–88	Eintracht Braunschweig
1988–89	TSV Havelse
1989–90	VfB Oldenburg
1990–91	VfL Wolfsburg
1991–92	VfL Wolfsburg
1992–93	VfL Herzlake
1993–94	Kickers Emden
1994 – 2004	no competition
2004–05	Kickers Emden
2005–06	SV Wilhelmshaven
2006–07	VfL Wolfsburg II
2007–08	Holstein Kiel

== Placings in the Oberliga Nord 1975 to 2008 ==
The clubs in the league and their final placings:

Club	75	76	77	78	79	80	81	82	83	84	85	86	87	88	89	90	91	92	93	94	05	06	07	08
VfL Wolfsburg	2B	2	2B	2	5	3	6	4	5	14	9	6	6	2	3	4	1	1	2B	2B	B	B	B	B
FC St. Pauli	2B	2B	2B	B	2B	10	1	6	1	2	2B	1	2B	2B	B	B	B	2B	2B	2B	R	R	R	2B
VfL Osnabrück	2B	2B	2B	2B	2B	2B	2B	2B	2B	2B	1	2B	2B	2B	2B	2B	2B	2B	2B	3	R	R	R	2B
Eintracht Braunschweig	B	B	B	B	B	B	2B	B	B	B	B	2B	2B	1	2B	2B	2B	2B	2B	2	R	2B	2B	R
VfB Lübeck				7	4	12	12	15	17											9	R	R	R	R
SV Werder Bremen II			8	10	7	6	2	1	2	1	3	5	9	4	6	9	3	2	3	8	R	R	R	R
Hamburger SV II																5	5	11	6	10	R	R	R	R
Kickers Emden																		6	8	1	1	R	R	R
VfL Wolfsburg II																					R	3	1	R
Holstein Kiel	10	13	3	4	2B	2B	2B	7	3	7	14	15	4	5	4	7	4	7	5	7	R	R	R	1
FC Altona 93											11	4	11	11	5	10	12	14	14		12	7	5	2
SV Wilhelmshaven	2B	4	10	12	16	17			15	11	8	11	14	17							2	1	R	3
Hannover 96 II																					11	5	6	4
BV Cloppenburg																					6	2	2	5
TuS Heeslingen																								6
VfB Oldenburg	1	3	7	8	8	1	2B	9	16	15	4	2	5	3	7	1	2B	2B	2B	6				7
SV Meppen	3	6	13	17		8	4	13	7	6	5	3	1	2B	2B	2B	2B	2B	2B	2B	3	8	4	8
FC Oberneuland																							3	9
Eintracht Braunschweig II		11	15	14	17					18		13	17									12	10	10
VfL Osnabrück II																						13	12	11
FC St. Pauli II																					8	10	8	12
ASV Bergedorf 85																					10	11	13	13
SV Lurup								17		3	7	17							10	14				14
Eintracht Nordhorn		9	9	13	12	16	16										14	10	15		4	4	7	15
VSK Osterholz-Scharmbeck																							14	16
VfB Lübeck II																					17			17
SV Henstedt-Rhen																							16	18
Holstein Kiel II ^{1}																					7	6	9	
VfR Neumünster ^{2}																					5	14	11	
Arminia Hannover	2	1	2B	2B	2B	2B	11	2	9	8	6	9	2	13	11	13	18				9	9	15	
VfL 93 Hamburg																			11	11			17	
SV Ramlingen																							18	
TSV Kropp																						15		
Eider Büdelsdorf																					14	16		
Meiendorfer SV																					13	17		
Brinkumer SV																						18		
HSV Barmbek-Uhlenhorst	2B	15	11	5	11	11	18														15			
Concordia Hamburg	11	7	5	6	9	13	9	14	11	13	16	8	12	7	15	12	15				16			
Victoria Hamburg	4	16	17																		18			
VfL Herzlake															10	15	10	13	1	4				
TuS Hoisdorf															8	3	11	8	9	5				
TuS Celle																	7	5	7	12				
SC Göttingen 05	2B	2B	2B	3	6	2	2B	3	12	5	12	10	3	6	2	6	2	12	4	13				
1. SC Norderstedt														15	9	8	6	4	2	15				
Preußen Hameln	5	12	4	11	10	14	17													16				
TSV Havelse								10	6	4	15	16	7	9	1	2	2B	3	16					
VfL Stade																		9	17					
TuS Lingen																			12					
SVG Göttingen																11	13	9	13					
TSV Osterholz-Tenever																		15						
Bremer SV	17				13	15	14						16	12	16	16	8	16						
Wolfenbütteler SV												12	10	8	12	14	16							
SpVgg Eutin																	17							
FC Mahndorf															16	13	18							
TuS Esens																17								
SFL Bremerhaven															17									
Lüneburger SK							8	12	14	16	13	14	13	14	18									
Atlas Delmenhorst			6	15	14	4	7	8	18				15	18										
Hummelsbüttler SV							13				2	7	18											
MTV Gifhorn						7	10	5	4	9	10	18												
OSC Bremerhaven	6	10	1	2B	2	2B	5	16	10	12	17													
TuS Hessisch Oldendorf									13	10	18													
SV Union Salzgitter	12	5	2	9	3	5	3	11	8	17														
OSV Hannover	9	14	14	1	1	2B	2B	18																
Itzehoer SV	8	17	12	16	15	9	15																	
Blumenthaler SV	7	8	16			18																		
1. FC Phönix Lübeck	14				18																			
VfL Pinneberg				18																				
SpVgg Bad Pyrmont	13	18	18																					
SpVgg Flensburg 08	15																							
Heider SV	16																							
SC Poppenbüttel	18																							

- For final placings of Oberliga clubs from this region from 1994 to 2004, see Oberliga Niedersachsen/Bremen and Oberliga Hamburg/Schleswig-Holstein.
- ^{1} In 2007 Holstein Kiel II was relegated due to the relegation of its first team.
- ^{2} In 2007 VfR Neumünster was refused a licence and relegated.

=== Key ===
Symbol	Key
B	Bundesliga (1963–present)
2B	2. Bundesliga (1974–present)
R	Regionalliga Nord (1994–present)
1	League champions
Place	League
Blank	Played at a league level below this league

== Founding members of the Oberliga Nord ==
The league started in 1974 with eighteen clubs from four German states:

From the Regionalliga Nord:

- VfB Oldenburg
- SV Meppen
- Arminia Hannover
- Concordia Hamburg
- OSV Hannover
- Holstein Kiel
- TuS Bremerhaven 93
- Heider SV
- Itzehoer SV
- Phönix Lübeck

From the Landesliga Hamburg:

- SC Victoria Hamburg
- SC Poppenbüttel

From the Amateurliga Bremen:

- Blumenthaler SV
- Bremer SV

From the Landesliga Schleswig-Holstein:

- SpVgg Flensburg 08

From the Amateurliga Niedersachsen:

- Preußen Hameln
- SpVgg Bad Pyrmont
- Union Salzgitter

== Disbanding of the Oberliga in 2008 ==
At the end of its last season, 2007–08, the last round having been played on 30 May 2008, the clubs of the league were spread over various other divisions, according to their final league position. The 6th placed team, TuS Heeslingen, was not granted a Regionalliga licence and the 7th placed club, VfB Oldenburg, qualified for the play-offs instead. The Bremen champion, FC Bremerhaven, was also not granted a licence and the best place club from Bremen in the Oberliga, the FC Oberneuland, qualified instead. Its eighteen clubs went to the following leagues:

To the Regionalliga Nord:

- Holstein Kiel
- SV Wilhelmshaven
- FC Altona 93
- BV Cloppenburg
- Hannover 96 II
- FC Oberneuland

To the Verbandsliga Bremen:

- no club relegated to this league

To the Verbandsliga Hamburg:

- FC St. Pauli II
- ASV Bergedorf 85
- SV Lurup

To the Verbandsligas Niedersachsen:

- VfB Oldenburg
- TuS Heeslingen
- SV Meppen
- Eintracht Braunschweig II
- VfL Osnabrück II
- Eintracht Nordhorn
- VSK Osterholz-Scharmbeck

To the Verbandsliga Schleswig-Holstein:

- VfB Lübeck II
- SV Henstedt-Rhen
