= 2015–16 Bremen-Liga =

- Season: 2015–16
- Champions: Bremer SV
- Relegated: Union 60 Bremen KSV Vatan Sport
- Top goalscorer: Bashkim Toski (34 goals)
- All statistics correct as of 22 May 2016.

The 2015–16 season of the Bremen-Liga, the highest association football league in the German state of Bremen, was the eighth season of the league at tier five (V) of the German football league system.

The season began on 29 August 2015 and finished on 22 May 2016, interrupted by a winter break from 19 December to 31 January.

== 2015–16 standings ==
The 2015–16 season saw two new clubs in the league, Bremer TS Neustadt and ESC Geestemünde, both promoted from the Landesliga Bremen.

Of the Bremen-Liga teams only Bremer SV and Blumenthaler SV applied for a Regionalliga licence for the 2016–17 season, with the Northern German Football Association deciding on 9 May 2016 to grant all applicants a licence.

| Pos | Team | Pld | W | D | L | GF | GA | GD | Pts | Qualification or relegation |
|---|---|---|---|---|---|---|---|---|---|---|
| 1 | Bremer SV (C, Q) | 30 | 26 | 2 | 2 | 120 | 17 | +103 | 80 | Qualification to promotion playoffs |
| 2 | Blumenthaler SV | 30 | 22 | 6 | 2 | 100 | 32 | +68 | 72 | |
| 3 | Werder Bremen III | 30 | 18 | 5 | 7 | 108 | 42 | +66 | 59 | |
| 4 | TuS Schwachhausen | 30 | 16 | 7 | 7 | 82 | 62 | +20 | 55 | |
| 5 | Brinkumer SV | 30 | 16 | 5 | 9 | 90 | 48 | +42 | 53 | |
| 6 | SG Aumund-Vegesack | 30 | 15 | 4 | 11 | 66 | 48 | +18 | 49 | |
| 7 | BTS Neustadt | 30 | 11 | 7 | 12 | 49 | 61 | −12 | 40 | |
| 8 | ESC Geestemünde | 30 | 11 | 6 | 13 | 52 | 66 | −14 | 39 | |
| 9 | Habenhauser FV | 30 | 11 | 5 | 14 | 67 | 79 | −12 | 38 | |
| 10 | VfL 07 Bremen | 30 | 9 | 7 | 14 | 47 | 62 | −15 | 34 | |
| 11 | SV Grohn | 30 | 7 | 11 | 12 | 48 | 61 | −13 | 32 | |
| 12 | TSV Grolland | 30 | 8 | 8 | 14 | 53 | 76 | −23 | 32 | |
| 13 | OSC Bremerhaven | 30 | 8 | 7 | 15 | 62 | 105 | −43 | 31 | |
| 14 | Leher TS | 30 | 9 | 3 | 18 | 60 | 109 | −49 | 30 | |
| 15 | Union 60 Bremen (R) | 30 | 4 | 7 | 19 | 32 | 82 | −50 | 19 | Relegation to Landesliga Bremen |
| 16 | KSV Vatan Sport Bremen (R) | 30 | 1 | 6 | 23 | 25 | 113 | −88 | 9 | Relegation to Landesliga Bremen |

Source: soccerway.com
Rules for classification: 1) Points; 2) Goal difference; 3) Goals scored; 4) head-to-head results; 5) goals scored away from home against opponent; 6) goals scored away from home; 7) drawing of lots
(C) Champions; (Q) Qualified for the phase indicated; (R) Relegated

=== Top goalscorers ===
The top goal scorers for the season:

| Rank | Player | Club | Goals |
|---|---|---|---|
| 1 | (Albania) Bashkim Toski | TSV Grolland | 34 |
| 2 | (Germany) Eduard Kimmel | ESC Geestemünde | 24 |
| 3 | (Germany) Marcel Dörgeloh | Brinkumer SV | 23 |
| 4 | (Turkey) Yagmur Horata | Werder Bremen III | 21 |

== Promotion play-off ==
Promotion play-off were to be held at the end of the season to the Regionalliga Nord. The runners-up of the Niedersachsenliga and the champions or, in Hamburg's case, the only team applying for a licence, of the Bremen-Liga, Oberliga Hamburg and Schleswig-Holstein-Liga played each other for two more spot in the Regionalliga. In the promotion round each team met the other just once with the two highest-placed teams in the final table promoted:

| Pos | Team | Pld | W | D | L | GF | GA | GD | Pts | Promotion | GER | SVE | ALT | BSV |
|---|---|---|---|---|---|---|---|---|---|---|---|---|---|---|
| 1 | Germania Egestorf (P) | 3 | 1 | 2 | 0 | 5 | 4 | +1 | 5 | Promotion to Regionalliga Nord | — | 2–2 | 2–1 | — |
| 2 | SV Eichede (P) | 3 | 1 | 2 | 0 | 5 | 4 | +1 | 5 | Promotion to Regionalliga Nord | — | — | — | 2–1 |
| 3 | Altona 93 | 3 | 1 | 1 | 1 | 4 | 3 | +1 | 4 | | — | 1–1 | — | — |
| 4 | Bremer SV | 3 | 0 | 1 | 2 | 2 | 5 | −3 | 1 | | 1–1 | — | 0–2 | — |

Source: Weltfussball.de
Rules for classification: 1) Points; 2) Head-to-head; 3) Decider;
(P) Promoted
