= 2014–15 Bremen-Liga =

- Season: 2014–15
- Champions: Bremer SV
- Relegated: FC Sparta Bremerhaven Türkspor Bremen
- Top goalscorer: Rafael Brand (38 goals)

The 2014–15 season of the Bremen-Liga, the highest association football league in the German state of Bremen, was the seventh season of the league at tier five (V) of the German football league system.

== League table ==
The 2014–15 season saw two new clubs in the league, Leher Turnerschaft and TSV Grolland, both promoted from the Landesliga Bremen, while no club had been relegated from the Regionalliga Nord to the league.

Pos	Team	Pld	W	D	L	GF	GA	GD	Pts	Qualification or relegation
1	Bremer SV (C, Q)	30	25	5	0	118	23	+95	80	Qualification to promotion playoffs
2	Brinkumer SV	30	23	3	4	119	31	+88	72	
3	Blumenthaler SV	30	17	6	7	72	38	+34	57	
4	TuS Schwachhausen	30	17	6	7	78	55	+23	57	
5	SG Aumund-Vegesack	30	16	7	7	63	34	+29	55	
6	FC Sparta Bremerhaven (Note: FC Sparta Bremerhaven withdrew from the league in at the end of season and was relegated.) (R)	30	17	2	11	67	49	+18	53	Relegation to Landesliga Bremen
7	Werder Bremen III	30	14	6	10	72	48	+24	48	
8	OSC Bremerhaven	30	14	2	14	89	68	+21	44	
9	VfL Bremen	30	10	6	14	50	59	−9	36	
10	Habenhauser FV	30	9	6	15	52	69	−17	33	
11	FC Union 60 Bremen	30	9	3	18	48	85	−37	30	
12	Leher TS	30	8	5	17	44	63	−19	29	
13	SV Grohn	30	8	4	18	46	97	−51	28	
14	TSV Grolland	30	8	3	19	56	108	−52	27	
15	Vatan Sport	30	7	4	19	46	87	−41	25	
16	Türkspor Bremen (R)	30	3	2	25	33	139	−106	11	Relegation to Landesliga Bremen

Source: soccerway.com
Rules for classification: 1) Points; 2) Goal difference; 3) Goals scored; 4) head-to-head results; 5) goals scored away from home against opponent; 6) goals scored away from home; 7) drawing of lots
(C) Champions; (Q) Qualified for the phase indicated; (R) Relegated

=== Top goalscorers ===
The top goal scorers for the season:

Rank	Player	Club	Goals
1	(Germany) Rafael Brand	OSC Bremerhaven	38
2	(Germany) Saimir Dikollari	Brinkumer SV	32
3	(Turkey) Mehmet Ali Fidan	FC Sparta Bremerhaven	31
4	(Iran) Iman Bi-Ria	Bremer SV	30

== Promotion round ==
The champions of the Bremen-Liga, Oberliga Hamburg and the Schleswig-Holstein-Liga as well as the runners-up from the Niedersachsenliga entered a play-off for two more spots in the Regionalliga Nord. Eight clubs from these four leagues applied for a Regionalliga licence. As the only club from Hamburg to apply for a licence, SC Victoria Hamburg, later declined participation only three clubs take part in the promotion round, Bremer SV, TSV Schilksee and VfV 06 Hildesheim, with the latter two promoted:

31 May 2015	Bremer SV	2–1	VfV 06 Hildesheim	Panzenberg Stadium, Bremen
14:00	Kurkiewicz 17' Abendroth 80' (pen.)	Report	Rockahr 48'	Attendance: 912; Referee: Franz Bokop

3 June 2015	TSV Schilksee	2–1	Bremer SV	Jürgen-Lüthje-Arena, Kiel
19:30	Schubert 4' Nath 41'	Report	Koweschnikow 89'	Attendance: 832; Referee: Robert Schröder

6 June 2015	VfV 06 Hildesheim	3–2	TSV Schilksee	Friedrich-Ebert-Stadion, Hildesheim
15:00	Rockahr 20' Fahmy 31' Schlichting 87'	Report	Petrick 59' Nath 82'	Attendance: 2,598; Referee: Florian Heft
