= Oberliga Niedersachsen/Bremen =

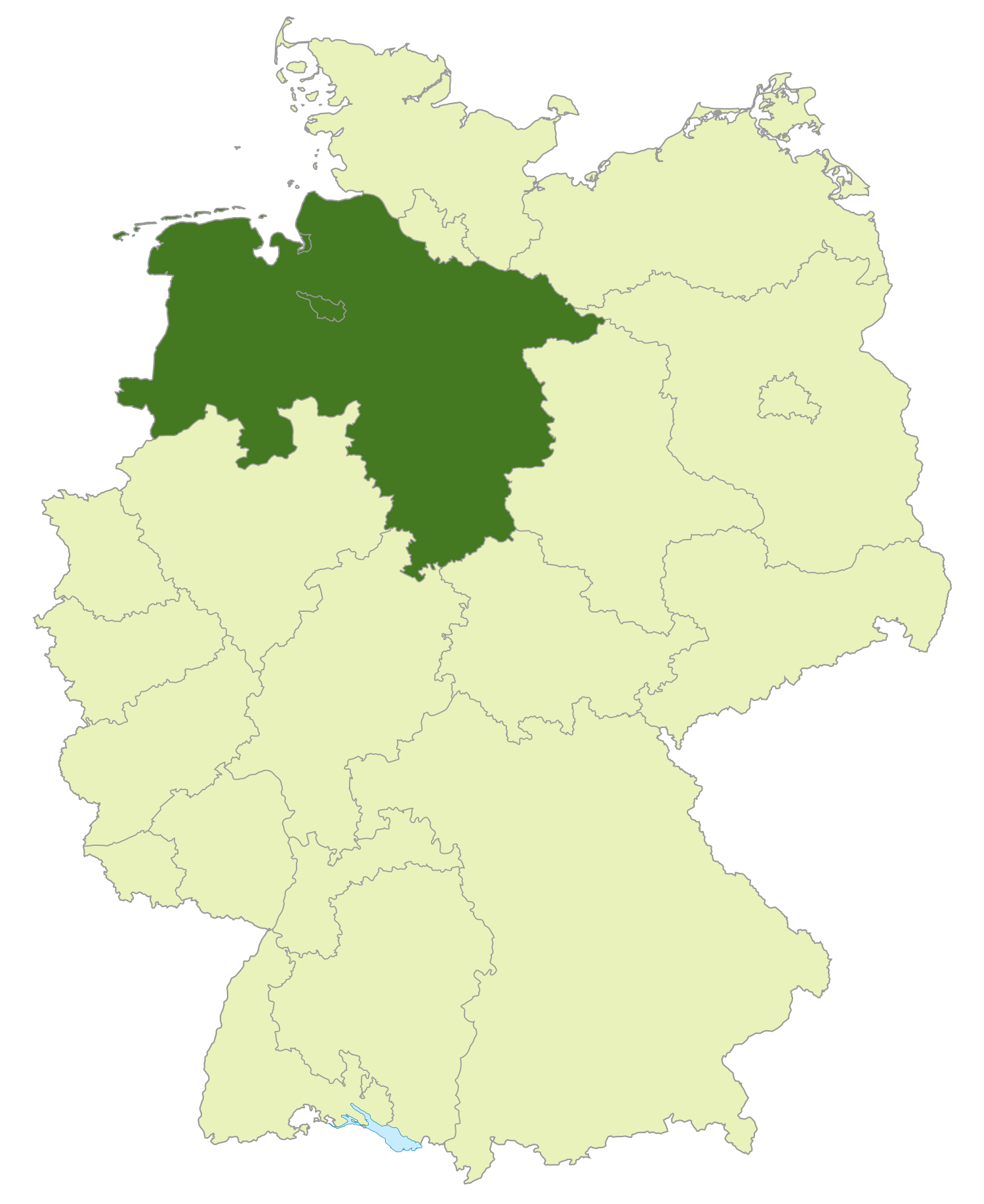
- Founded: 1994
- Folded: 2004 (10 seasons)
- Replaced by: Oberliga Nord
- Country: Germany
- States: Lower Saxony; Bremen
- Level on pyramid: Level 4
- Promotion to: Regionalliga Nord
- Relegation to: Verbandsliga Bremen; Verbandsliga Niedersachsen-Ost; Verbandsliga Niedersachsen-West
- Last champions: VfL Wolfsburg II (2003–04)

The Oberliga Niedersachsen/Bremen was the fourth tier of the German football league system in the north of Germany, existing from 1994 to 2004. It covered the states of Lower Saxony and Bremen. With the re-formation of the Oberliga Nord in 2004, the league was disbanded.

== Overview ==
The Oberliga Niedersachsen/Bremen started out in 1994 as a replacement for the Oberliga Nord, which was disbanded in that year. Along with this league, the Oberliga Hamburg/Schleswig-Holstein was formed to cover the other two of the four states the Oberliga Nord previously had served. The reason for the disbanding of the Oberliga Nord and the creation of two separate leagues in its stead was the formation of the Regionalliga Nord, which became the new third tier of league football in the north and covered exactly the same region as the Oberliga previously.

The league was formed from sixteen clubs, with twelve of them coming from the Verbandsliga Niedersachsen, three from the Verbandsliga Bremen and one from the Oberliga Nord. With the inception of this league, the Verbandsliga Niedersachsen split itself into two groups, east and west.

For the duration of the league's existence, it was fed by the three Verbandsligas of Bremen, Niedersachsen-West and Niedersachsen-Ost with the winners of these leagues gaining direct promotion to the Oberliga. Bremen, the smallest of the twenty-one German football associations, was the junior partner in this league, always only providing a small number of clubs.

The winner of the Oberliga was directly promoted to the Regionalliga from 1995 to 1999. In 2000, no promotion was available due to changes in the league system. From 2001 to 2004, the league champion had to play-off for promotion with the winner of the Oberliga Hamburg/Schleswig-Holstein. Only in 2004 could the champion of Niedersachsen/Bremen win this contest and gain promotion.

In 2000, with the reduction of the number of Regionalligas to two, eight clubs were relegated from this league to the Oberliga. The bottom seven clubs of the Oberliga were relegated that year and the league expanded to eighteen teams. The Regionalliga Nord now covered the complete northern half of Germany, not just the traditional region of the Oberliga Nord.

On these grounds it was decided in 2004 to reform a united Oberliga Nord which allowed direct promotion to its champion to the Regionalliga. The Oberliga Niedersachsen/Bremen was therefore disbanded. Its champion gained promotion to the Regionalliga this season, the clubs placed second to eighth were admitted to the new Oberliga. The other ten clubs in the league were relegated to the Verbandsligas.

In 2008, with the introduction of the new 3. Liga, the Oberliga Nord was disbanded again. The Oberligas Niedersachsen/Bremen and Hamburg/Schleswig-Holstein however were not reformed. Below the Regionalliga Nord the five Verbandsligas in the north functioned instead as the next level of play, making it, until 2012, the only region without an Oberliga and without direct promotion to the Regionalliga.

== League champions ==
The league champions:

Season	Club
1994–95	BV Cloppenburg
1995–96	Sportfreunde Ricklingen
1996–97	Eintracht Nordhorn
1997–98	Lüneburger SK
1998–99	SC Göttingen 05
1999–2000	Kickers Emden
2000–01	SC Göttingen 05
2001–02	VfB Oldenburg
2002–03	Kickers Emden
2003–04	VfL Wolfsburg II

== Placings in the league from 1994 to 2004 ==
The complete list of clubs in the league and their final placings:

Club	1995	1996	1997	1998	1999	2000	2001	2002	2003	2004
VfL Wolfsburg II						3	9	6	2	1
Eintracht Nordhorn		8	1	R	R	R	5	2	4	2
SV Wilhelmshaven	R	R	R	R	R	R	R	3	3	3
BV Cloppenburg	1	R	7	2	R	R	4	10	5	4
Hannover 96 II	11	12	16				14			5
Kickers Emden	R	R	R	R	R	1	2	8	1	6
Arminia Hannover	8	11	2	R	R	R	3	11	7	7
SV Meppen	2B	2B	2B	2B	R	R	11	4	8	8
VfB Oldenburg	R	R	2B	R	R	R	8	1	6	9
Eintracht Braunschweig II									9	10
Concordia Ihrhove			8	8	8	6	10	7	14	11
FC Oberneuland			4	3	3	2	6	5	10	12
Rotenburger SV				9	11	7	7	13	13	13
SC Langenhagen								14	11	14
VfV 06 Hildesheim									12	15
SSV Vorsfelde			3	10	10	10				16
Lüneburger SK	R	R	R	1	R	R	R	15	15	17
SC Weyhe								17		18
SC Göttingen 05	R	2	R	R	1	R	1	9	16	
FC Schüttorf				14		5	12	12	17	
FC Bremerhaven	R	9	13	5	2	R	16		18	
SVG Einbeck				12	6	11		16		
TuS Celle	R	R	R	R	R	R	13	18		
TSV Havelse	3	6	10	4	5	4	15			
Blau-Weiß Lohne	5	5	15		9	9	17			
TuS Lingen	7	10	5	6	4	8	18			
Südharz Walkenried		7	9	13	14	12				
MTV Wolfenbüttel			11	11	7	13				
Bremer TS Neustadt	15					14				
SVG Göttingen	12	3	12	7	12	15				
Sportfreunde Ricklingen	4	1	R	R	R	16				
Atlas Delmenhorst ^{1}	2	R	R	R	13					
MTV Gifhorn					15					
SV Werder Bremen III					16					
SC Harsum	6	4	6	15						
Blumenthaler SV				16						
SpVg Aurich	10	13	14							
Vatan Sport Bremen		14								
SC Vahr	13	15								
TuS Esens	9	16								
Preußen Hameln	14									
FC Mahndorf	16									

- ^{1} Atlas Delmenhorst withdrew from the league in 1999.

=== Key ===
Symbol	Key
B	Bundesliga (1963–present)
2B	2. Bundesliga (1974–present)
R	Regionalliga Nord (1994–present)
1	League champions
Place	League
Blank	Played at a league level below this league

== Founding members of the league ==
The league was formed from sixteen clubs from two states in 1994, those being:

From the Oberliga Nord:

- Preußen Hameln

From the Verbandsliga Bremen:

- FC Mahndorf
- SC Vahr
- Bremer TS Neustadt

From the Verbandsliga Niedersachsen:

- Atlas Delmenhorst
- TSV Havelse
- BV Cloppenburg
- Sportfreunde Ricklingen
- SC Harsum
- TuS Esens
- SpVg Aurich
- TuS Lingen
- Blau-Weiß Lohne
- SpVgg Göttingen
- Arminia Hannover
- Hannover 96 II

== Disbanding of the league ==
The league was disbanded in 2004 and replaced by the Oberliga Nord. Its clubs were spread between the Regionalliga Nord, Oberliga Nord and the three Verbandsligas:

To the Regionalliga Nord:

- VfL Wolfsburg II

To the Oberliga Nord:

- Eintracht Nordhorn
- SV Wilhelmshaven
- BV Cloppenburg
- Hannover 96 II
- Kickers Emden
- Arminia Hannover
- SV Meppen

To the Verbandsliga Bremen:

- FC Oberneuland
- SC Weyhe

To the Verbandsliga Niedersachsen-Ost:

- Eintracht Braunschweig II
- Rotenburger SV
- SSV Vorsfelde
- Lüneburger SK

To the Verbandsliga Niedersachsen-West:

- VfB Oldenburg
- SC Langenhagen
- VfV 06 Hildesheim

Team withdrawn:

- Concordia Ihrhove
