= Bremen-Liga =

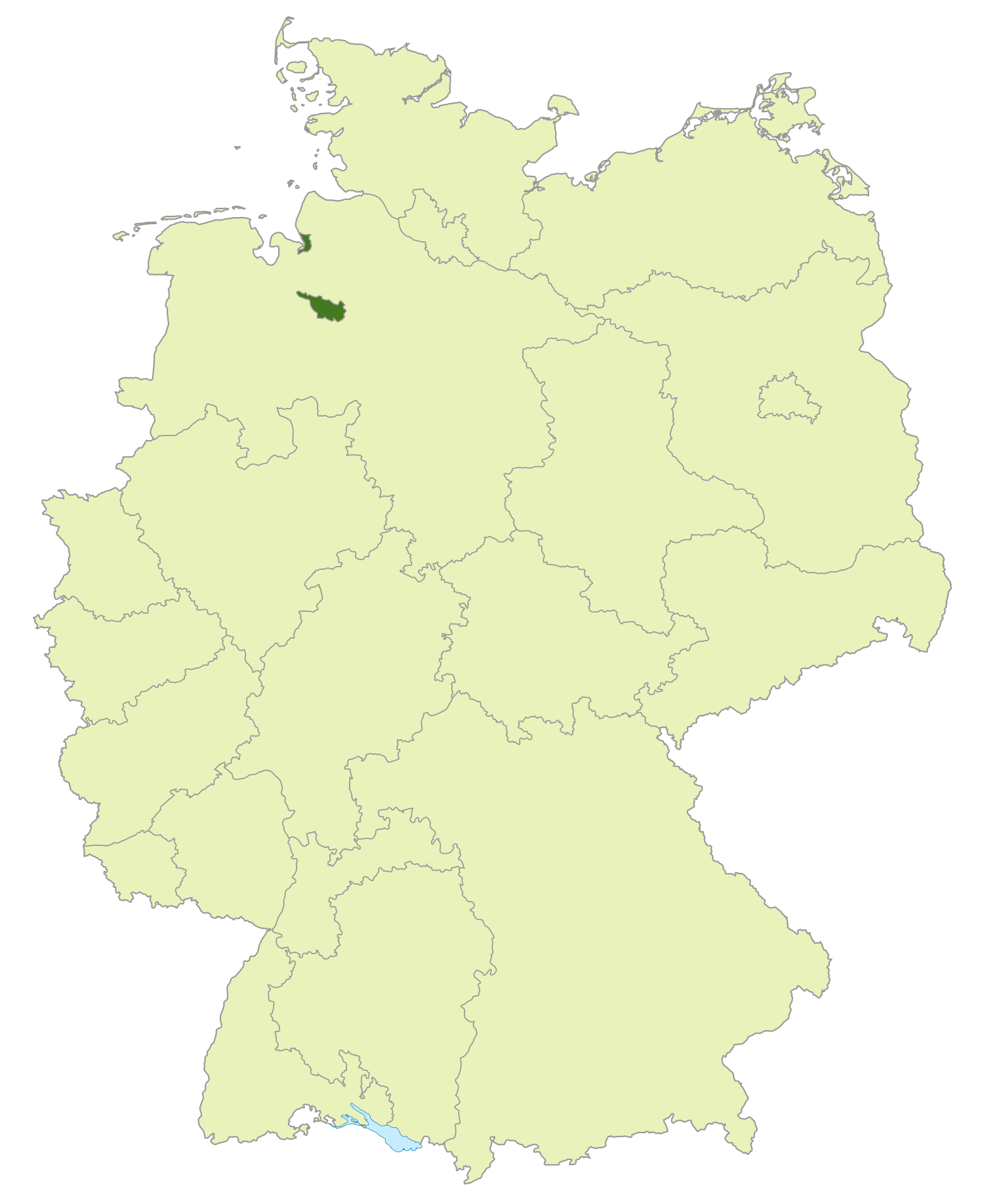
- Founded: 1947
- Country: Germany
- State: Bremen
- Number of clubs: 16
- Level on pyramid: Level 5
- Promotion to: Regionalliga Nord
- Relegation to: Landesliga Bremen
- Current champions: Blumenthaler SV (2025–26 Oberliga Bremen)
- Current: 2026–27 Oberliga Bremen

The Bremen-Liga, sometimes also referred to as Oberliga Bremen, is a fifth tier of the German football league system and the highest league in the German state Free Hanseatic City of Bremen. It is one of fourteen Oberligas in German football, the fifth tier of the German football league system.

== Overview ==
=== 1947–1963 ===
The league was formed in 1947 as Amateurliga Bremen by thirteen clubs, including four from outside the city-state, in the newly recreated state Free Hanseatic City of Bremen which was then part of the US occupation zone in Germany.

The Free Hanseatic City of Bremen and its football association are the smallest in Germany. The state is actually separated in two halves, the cities of Bremen and Bremerhaven are split by the state of Lower Saxony.

From the start, the Amateurliga Bremen was a feeder league to the Oberliga Nord which its champion had the option of promotion to. Promotion had to be achieved through a play-off with teams from the Amateurligas of Lower Saxony, Hamburg and Schleswig-Holstein. As such, the league was the second tier of the northern German league system.

Promotion to the Oberliga however, became hard to archive for the Bremen champion which only succeeded in 1948 and 1961. This resulted however in a number of back-to-back championships, an oddity for leagues at this level in Germany where direct promotion is the standard.

After its second season, the four clubs from Lower Saxony left the league to rejoin their state's league system. To this day, the Bremen league system however continues to host a few clubs from the neighboring state, usually clubs based right at the border of Bremen.

The league was expanded to fourteen clubs in its third season, compensating for the lost clubs from Lower Saxony by promoting more local clubs. For the coming seasons, the league stuck mostly with a strength of fifteen clubs.

=== 1963–1974 ===
In 1963, with the introduction of the Bundesliga, the disbanding of the Oberliga Nord and the formation of the Regionalliga Nord, the league fell to tier three, but remained unchanged otherwise, with fifteen clubs as its strength. The champion of Bremen continued to have to play-off for promotion, now to the Regionalliga, with the same opposition as before and the same limited success.

The league was increased in size to sixteen clubs in 1973.

=== 1974–1994 ===
After the 1973–74 season, the Regionalliga Nord was disbanded in favor of the 2. Bundesliga Nord. The new Oberliga Nord was now introduced in northern Germany, as the third tier of the league system, below the 2nd Bundesliga. This meant for the Amateurliga a slip to tier four. The top two teams of the league were however promoted to the new Oberliga and the Amateurliga was renamed Verbandsliga Bremen. The system for promotion from the Verbandsliga remained mostly unchanged but the success rate for the clubs from Bremen greatly improved.

=== 1994–2008 ===
In 1994, the Regionalliga Nord was re-established, now as the third tier of the league system. The Oberliga Nord was in turn replaced by two parallel Oberligas, Niedersachsen/Bremen and Hamburg/Schleswig-Holstein. For the Verbandsliga Bremen, this meant a further slip, now to tier five, but also, for the first time in its history, direct promotion for the league champion.

The 1999–2000 season saw another league system change with the reduction of numbers of Regionalligas, this however had only one effect on the Verbandsliga, no promotion was available this year.

In 2004, it was decided to restore the Oberliga Nord in favor of the two separate Oberligas.

The 2006–07 league winner and runner-up, Bremer SV and FC Bremerhaven, did not receive an Oberliga licence and were not promoted.

=== 2008 onwards ===
At the end of the 2007–08 season, the new 3. Liga was established and the Oberliga Nord disbanded, again. The four northern German states then were the only region without an Oberliga and the five Verbandsligen sit right below the Regionalliga Nord, parallel to the two NOFV-Oberligen. At the end of the 2007–08 season, the five winners of the northern Verbandsligas played with the sixth placed team from the Oberliga Nord for one last spot in the Regionalliga. The FC Bremerhaven was however refused a Regionalliga licence and therefore not permitted to take part in the promotion round, being replaced by the FC Oberneuland instead.

In the future seasons, promotion for the Bremen champion will only be available through a set of play-off matches with the league winners from Hamburg and Schleswig-Holstein. These three teams will compete for one promotion spot to the Regionalliga.

The Verbandsliga Bremen will however maintain its status as a tier five league. It is also the only league on this level with a single feeder league, the Landesliga Bremen, below it. In the 2007–08 season, two clubs from the Verbandsliga will be relegated to the Landesliga and two clubs promoted from there.

In the 2008–09 season, three teams from Bremen played above the Verbandsliga level, these being:

- SV Werder Bremen (Bundesliga)
- SV Werder Bremen II (3. Liga)
- FC Oberneuland (Regionalliga Nord)

While this seems a small number, one has to consider that the Bremen FA only consists of 80 clubs.

From the 2008–09 season, the league effectively has the status of an Oberliga and is referred to as such on some websites while the DFB list the league as Bremen-Liga as its new official name.

== Position of the Bremen-Liga in the league system ==
Years	Tier	Promotion to
1947–1963	II	Oberliga Nord
1963–1974	III	Regionalliga Nord
1974–1994	IV	Oberliga Nord
1994–2004	V	Oberliga Niedersachsen/Bremen
2004–2008	V	Oberliga Nord
2008–	V	Regionalliga Nord

Source:"Verbandsliga Bremen". Das deutsche Fussball-Archiv.

== Founding members of the Amateurliga Bremen ==
Thirteen clubs, four from Niedersachsen and the other nine from Bremen, formed the league in 1947, these clubs being:

- TuS Bremerhaven 93
- Blumenthaler SV
- SV Hemelingen
- ATS Bremerhaven
- Komet Bremen
- Hastedter TSV
- VfL Visselhövede, club based in Lower Saxony
- SSV Delmenhorst, club based in Lower Saxony
- Cuxhavener SV, club based in Lower Saxony
- TuRa Bremen
- TV Arsten
- Delmenhorster BV, club based in Lower Saxony
- TSV Bassum

Source:"Amateurliga Bremen". Das deutsche Fussball-Archiv.

== Winners of the Bremen–Liga ==
**Season**	**Club**
1947–48	**TuS Bremerhaven 93**
1948–49	SV Hemelingen
1949–50	Blumenthaler SV
1950–51	Blumenthaler SV
1951–52	Blumenthaler SV
1952–53	ATSV 1860 Bremen
1953–54	ATSV 1860 Bremen
1954–55	ATSV 1860 Bremen
1955–56	Bremer SV
1956–57	SV Werder Bremen II
1957–58	Bremer SV
1958–59	Blumenthaler SV
1959–60	Polizei SV Bremen
1960–61	**Bremer SV**
1961–62	SV Werder Bremen II
1962–63	AGSV Bremen
1963–64	Blumenthaler SV
1964–65	**Bremer SV**
1965–66	Eintracht Bremen
1966–67	SV Werder Bremen II
1967–68	SV Werder Bremen II
1968–69	TuS Bremerhaven 93 II
1969–70	Polizei SV Bremen
1970–71	**Polizei SV Bremen**
1971–72	Blumenthaler SV
1972–73	Blumenthaler SV

**Season**	**Club**
1973–74	**Blumenthaler SV**
1974–75	TSV Osterholz-Tenever
1975–76	**SV Werder Bremen II**
1976–77	SG Oslebshausen
1977–78	**Bremer SV**
1978–79	**Blumenthaler SV**
1979–80	SFL Bremerhaven
1980–81	FT Geestemünde
1981–82	SFL Bremerhaven
1982–83	Bremer SV
1983–84	SC Vahr
1984–85	Bremer SV
1985–86	**Bremer SV**
1986–87	**FC Mahndorf**
1987–88	**SFL Bremerhaven**
1988–89	Blumenthaler SV
1989–90	TSV Osterholz-Tenever
1990–91	**TSV Osterholz-Tenever**
1991–92	SFL Bremerhaven
1992–93	FC Bremerhaven
1993–94	**FC Bremerhaven**
1994–95	**SV Vatan Sport**
1995–96	**FC Oberneuland**
1996–97	**Blumenthaler SV**
1997–98	**SV Werder Bremen III**
1998–99	**BTS Neustadt**

**Season**	**Club**
1999–2000	SC Weyhe
2000–01	**SC Weyhe**
2001–02	**FC Bremerhaven**
2002–03	**SC Weyhe**
2003–04	KSV Vatan Sport Bremen
2004–05	SC Weyhe
2005–06	**FC Oberneuland**
2006–07	Bremer SV
2007–08	FC Bremerhaven
2008–09	Brinkumer SV
2009–10	SV Werder Bremen III
2010–11	SV Werder Bremen III
2011–12	**FC Oberneuland**
2012–13	SV Werder Bremen III
2013–14	Bremer SV
2014–15	Bremer SV
2015–16	Bremer SV
2016–17	Bremer SV
2017–18	Brinkumer SV
2018–19	Bremer SV
2019–20	**FC Oberneuland**
2020–21	None
2021–22	**Bremer SV**
2022–23	FC Oberneuland
2023–24	**SV Werder Bremen II**
2024–25	SV Hemelingen
2025–26	Blumenthaler SV

Source:"Verbandsliga Bremen". Das deutsche Fussball-Archiv.

- **Bold** denotes club gained promotion.
- In 1974 runner–up Bremer SV was also promoted.
- In 1994 the FC Mahndorf, SC Vahr and BTS Neustadt were also promoted.
- In 2005 the runner–up Brinkumer SV was promoted instead.
- In 2013 the fifth placed Brinkumer SV unsuccessfully took part in the promotion round as all better placed clubs were ineligible for the Regionalliga.
- In 2021 there was no champion or promotion after the decision to curtail the season during the COVID-19 pandemic in Germany.

== League placings ==
The complete list of clubs and placings in the league since elevation to Oberliga status (2008–present):

Club	09	10	11	12	13	14	15	16	17	18	19	20	21	22	23	24	25
Bremer SV	2	2	2	2	2	1	1	1	1	4	1	5	2	1	R	R	R
SV Werder Bremen II	3L	3L	3L	3L	R	R	R	3L	3L	3L	R	R	R	R	R	1	R
SV Hemelingen												6	10	7	2	2	1
ESC Geestemünde								8	12	9	5	10	7	6	6	6	2
OSC Bremerhaven	5	3	4	7	9	9	8	13	14	13	15		16	3	4	3	3
Brinkumer SV	1	4	8	9	5	3	2	5	3	1	8	3	1	2	11	14	4
TV Eiche Horn																	5
Blumenthaler SV	6	8	5	10	7	7	3	2	2	5	7	7	8	14	12	7	6
FC Oberneuland ^{1}	R	R	R	1	R				6	2	2	1	R	R	1	5	7
Union 60 Bremen				6	6	10	11	15				13	17	5	5	8	8
SG Aumund-Vegesack	8	11	3	5	3	4	5	6	7	7	6	9	11	13	3	4	9
TS Woltmershausen				16											9	13	10
Bremer TS Neustadt								7	9	14	14	14	15	4	7	9	11
Werder Bremen III	4	1	1	3	1	5	7	3	5	8	11	16	18	15	16		12
Habenhauser FV	7	9	10	8	8	8	10	9	11	12	13	15	12	17			13
Vatan Sport Bremen	16				10	14	15	16		11	16		5	8	10	12	14
TuRa Bremen																11	15
SC Vahr-Blockdiek	15															10	16
Leher TS							12	14	8	10	9	12	4	11	13	15	
TuS Komet Arsten													9	12	14	16	
TuS Schwachhausen	13	10	9	12	11	6	4	4	4	6	4	2	6	9	8		
TuSpo Surheide															15		
SFL Bremerhaven ^{2}											3	4	3	10			
BSC Hastedt										3	10	11	14	16			
SC Borgfeld											12	8	13	18			
VfL 07 Bremen	9	12	12	15		13	9	10	10	15							
TSV Grolland							14	12	13	16							
TSV Melchiorshausen	14	14	15						15								
SV Grohn		16				11	13	11	16								
FC Sparta Bremerhaven ^{3}					4	2	6										
SV Türkspor Bremen	11	6	14	13	12	12	16										
OT Bremen	12	15			14	15											
1. FC Burg			6	11	13	16											
SC Lehe-Spaden					15												
TSV Wulsdorf	10	7	11	14	16												
FC Bremerhaven ^{3}	3	5	7	4													
FC Oberneuland II		13	13														
SC Weyhe			16														

- ^{1} FC Oberneuland had to declare insolvency in 2013 and was relegated from the Regionalliga Nord, dropping two tiers to the Landesliga Bremen.
- ^{2} SFL Bremerhaven withdrew its first team from the league in 2022.
- ^{3} FC Bremerhaven was dissolved in 2012 and its football section joined FC Sparta Bremerhaven.

=== Key ===
Symbol	Key
B	Bundesliga
2B	2. Bundesliga
3L	3. Liga
R	Regionalliga Nord
1	League champions
Place	League
Blank	Played at a league level below this league
