= Lucas Fox (footballer) =

Luxembourgish footballer (born 2000)

Personal information
- Date of birth: 2 October 2000 (age 26)
- Place of birth: Luxembourg
- Position: Goalkeeper

Team information
- Current team: Bremer SV
- Number: 1

Youth career
- F91 Dudelange

Senior career*
Years	Team	Apps	(Gls)
2019–2021	Jeunesse Esch	34	(0)
2022–2023	F91 Dudelange	35	(0)
2023–2026	1. FC Bocholt	83	(0)
2026–	Bremer SV	4	(0)
- * Club domestic league appearances and goals as of 20 September 2026

Lucas Fox (born 2 October 2000) is a Luxembourgish footballer who plays as a goalkeeper for Bremer SV.

== Club career ==
As a youth player, he joined the youth academy of Luxembourgish side F91 Dudelange, which he left while playing for the club's under-19 team. Fox started his senior career with Luxembourgish side Jeunesse Esch, where he made thirty-four league appearances and scored zero goals.

In 2022, he returned to Luxembourgish side F91 Dudelange after trialing for Dutch side Go Ahead Eagles and receiving interest from German side FC Viktoria Köln, helping the club win the league title. Subsequently, he signed for German side 1. FC Bocholt in 2023, where he was regarded as one of the club's most important players.

After leaving Bocholt in July 2026, Fox was without a club before signing for Bremer SV in the Regionalliga Nord on 2 September 2026. He made his debut for the club on 9 September 2026 in a 2–3 defeat against Kickers Emden.

== Style of play ==
Fox plays as a goalkeeper. Right-footed, he has been described as "convincing on the line, but still has weaknesses with his foot".
