= VfL 07 Bremen =

German football club

Vfl 07 Bremen
- Full name: Verein für Leibesübungen 07 Bremen
- Founded: 1907
- Ground: BSA Findorff; Bremen
- Capacity: 2000
- Chairman: Thomas Hennings
- Manager: Helge Horn
- League: Bremen-Liga (V)
- 2015–16: 10th
- Website: https://www.vfl-07.de
Home colours	Away colours

Vfl 07 Bremen is a German football club located in the Findorff neighbourhood of north Bremen. They play in the Bremen-Liga, one of fourteen regional leagues in the fifth tier of German football.

== History ==
The club was formed in 1907 by a 14-year-old named Hermann Popper. The original name of the team was Fußball Club Hohenzollern, in tribute to the German Emperor Wilhelm II of Hohenzollern. After the German Empire was dissolved in 1918, the name Verein für Leibesübungen 07 was informally adopted, although the club name was not officially changed until after the end of World War II in 1945.

In recent times the club has fluctuated between the Landesliga Bremen and the Bremen-Liga above, playing in the latter again since 2013.

== Stadium ==
VfL 07 Bremen play their home matches in BSA Findorff, Bremen. The stadium has a capacity of 2000 spectators.

== Players ==
Note: Flags indicate national team as defined under FIFA eligibility rules; some limited exceptions apply. Players may hold more than one non-FIFA nationality.

No.	Pos.	Nation	Player
1	GK	GER	Ken Clar
2	DF	GER	David Pioch
3	DF	GER	Pascal Büssenschütt
4	DF	GER	Rene Hölzel
5	DF	GER	Steffen Egert
7	DF	GER	Ferdi Kök

W.I.P

== Honours ==
- Landesliga Bremen (VI):
  - Runners-up (1): 2006–07, 2012–13
- Bezirksliga Bremen (VII):
  - Winners (1): 2003–04
