= SV Hemelingen =

German sports club

- Full name: Sportvereinigung Hemelingen von 1858 e.V.
- Founded: 1858; 168 years ago
- Ground: Bezirkssportanlage Hemelingen
- Capacity: 4,000
- Manager: Feyhat Tuncel
- League: Bremen-Liga (V)
- 2025–26: Bremen-Liga, 2nd of 16
- Website: Website

SV Hemelingen is a German sports club based in Hemelingen, Bremen. The team currently plays in the Bremen-Liga, a fifth tier of the German football league system.

== Recent history ==
SV Hemelingen won the 2024–25 Bremen-Liga, clinching the title with four games remaining and advancing to the promotion playoffs. The championship was the club's first in the league in seventy-six years. Shortly after winning the league, the club defeated Bremer SV to win the Bremen Cup for the double. The following week, Hemelingen started its campaign for promotion to the Regionalliga Nord against Altona 93. Ultimately, SV Hemelingen earned two draws and a loss in its three matches and failed to earn promotion. Because of its performance in 2024/2025, the club earned a spot in the 2025–26 DFB-Pokal with a chance to play a Bundesliga club in the First Round. SV Hemelingen was eventually drawn against VFL Wolfsburg for its first-ever match in the competition. VFL Wolfsburg won the match 9–0, eliminating the Bremen side from the competition, and earning its largest-ever margin of victory in the DFB Pokal.

== Honours ==
Competitions	Titles	Seasons
Bremen-Liga	2	1948–49, 2024–25
Bremen Cup	4	1951, 1952, 2025, 2026
