= 2025–26 Oberliga =

Oberliga
- Season: 2025–26
- Champions: VfR Aalen (Baden-Württemberg); SC Eltersdorf (Bayern Nord); 1860 Munich II (Bayern Süd); Blumenthaler SV (Bremen); ETSV Hamburg (Hamburg); Eintracht Frankfurt II (Hesse); SV Bergisch Gladbach 09 (Mittelrhein); VfB 03 Hilden (Niederrhein); Atlas Delmenhorst (Niedersachsen); Tasmania Berlin (Nordost-Nord); RSV Eintracht (Nordost-Süd); 1. FC Kaiserslautern II (Rheinland-Pfalz/Saar); SV Todesfelde (Schleswig-Holstein); Westfalia Rhynern (Westfalen)

The 2025–26 season of the Oberliga is the 18th season of the Oberligas, the fifth tier of the German football league system.

== Tables ==
=== Baden-Württemberg ===
Pos	Team	Pld	W	D	L	GF	GA	GD	Pts	Promotion, qualification or relegation
1	VfR Aalen (C, P)	34	26	5	3	87	24	+63	83	Promotion to Regionalliga Südwest
2	VfR Mannheim (O)	34	20	9	5	81	34	+47	69	Play-off
3	FC Nöttingen	34	18	4	12	82	61	+21	58	
4	FV Ravensburg	34	16	9	9	61	52	+9	57	
5	TSV Essingen	34	14	12	8	54	58	−4	54	
6	SV Oberachern	34	16	6	12	54	62	−8	54	
7	1. CfR Pforzheim	34	12	12	10	68	61	+7	48	
8	SSV Reutlingen	34	12	11	11	56	50	+6	47	
9	FC 08 Villingen	34	12	11	11	55	56	−1	47	
10	Karlsruher SC II	34	11	10	13	54	61	−7	43	
11	TSG Backnang	34	12	6	16	50	67	−17	42	
12	Türkischer SV Singen	34	12	4	18	55	81	−26	40	
13	Normannia Gmünd	34	9	12	13	53	51	+2	39	
14	Türkspor Neckarsulm	34	11	6	17	52	61	−9	39	
15	1. Göppinger SV (R)	34	9	9	16	53	53	0	36	Relegation
16	FSV Hollenbach (R)	34	9	8	17	56	69	−13	35	Relegation
17	FSV Bietigheim-Bissingen (R)	34	7	12	15	54	81	−27	33	Relegation
18	FC Denzlingen (R)	34	5	4	25	35	78	−43	19	Relegation

Source: Soccerway
(C) Champions; (O) Play-off winners; (P) Promoted; (R) Relegated

=== Bayern Nord ===
Pos	Team	Pld	W	D	L	GF	GA	GD	Pts	Promotion, qualification or relegation
1	SC Eltersdorf (C, P)	32	21	2	9	55	30	+25	65	Promotion to Regionalliga Bayern
2	ASV Cham	32	17	8	7	58	35	+23	59	Play-off
3	ASV Neumarkt	32	18	5	9	68	50	+18	59	
4	DJK Gebenbach	32	16	5	11	53	47	+6	53	
5	FC Eintracht Bamberg	32	13	12	7	54	39	+15	51	
6	SpVgg SV Weiden	32	13	11	8	57	39	+18	50	
7	FC Ingolstadt 04 II	32	14	6	12	64	54	+10	48	
8	Fortuna Regensburg	32	12	9	11	66	58	+8	45	
9	Jahn Regensburg II	32	13	5	14	59	53	+6	44	
10	Bayern Hof	32	11	10	11	56	51	+5	43	
11	TSV Neudrossenfeld	32	12	5	15	47	54	−7	41	
12	TSV Kornburg	32	9	13	10	48	50	−2	40	
13	Würzburger FV	32	10	7	15	46	62	−16	37	
14	ATSV Erlangen (R)	32	10	7	15	43	61	−18	37	Relegation play-offs
15	FSV Stadeln (O)	32	11	2	19	42	65	−23	35	Relegation play-offs
16	FC Coburg (R)	32	9	3	20	44	81	−37	30	Relegation play-offs
17	SC Großschwarzenlohe (R)	32	4	8	20	35	66	−31	20	Relegation

Source: Soccerway
(C) Champions; (O) Play-off winners; (P) Promoted; (R) Relegated

=== Bayern Süd ===
Pos	Team	Pld	W	D	L	GF	GA	GD	Pts	Promotion, qualification or relegation
1	1860 Munich II (Note: Reserve teams are ineligible for promotion.) (C)	32	21	5	6	74	26	+48	68	
2	TSV Landsberg (P)	32	18	11	3	79	43	+36	65	Promotion to Regionalliga Bayern
3	SV Kirchanschöring	32	16	10	6	67	35	+32	58	Play-off
4	FC Gundelfingen (Note: FC Deisenhofen, FC Gundelfingen and SV Heimstetten all did not apply for a Regionalliga license.)	32	16	7	9	51	33	+18	55	
5	SV Erlbach	32	16	5	11	42	35	+7	53	
6	FC Pipinsried	32	15	7	10	58	37	+21	52	
7	SV Heimstetten	32	14	9	9	64	46	+18	51	
8	FC Deisenhofen	32	13	10	9	44	47	−3	49	
9	FC Sportfreunde Schwaig	32	12	9	11	48	44	+4	45	
10	TuS Geretsried	32	12	8	12	49	46	+3	44	
11	TSV 1861 Nördlingen (N)	32	11	11	10	58	58	0	44	
12	FC Ismaning	32	11	9	12	50	58	−8	42	
13	SV Schalding-Heining	32	9	11	12	43	50	−7	38	
14	TSV Kottern (O)	32	9	6	17	40	57	−17	33	Relegation play-offs
15	FC Sturm Hauzenberg (R)	32	6	5	21	24	64	−40	23	Relegation play-offs
16	Türkspor Augsburg (R)	32	4	5	23	28	83	−55	17	Relegation
17	Türkgücü München (R)	32	3	4	25	21	78	−57	13	Relegation

Source: Soccerway
(C) Champions; (N) Switching to the Nord group; (O) Play-off winners; (P) Promoted; (R) Relegated

=== Bremen ===
Pos	Team	Pld	W	D	L	GF	GA	GD	Pts	Qualification or relegation
1	Blumenthaler SV (C)	30	24	3	3	95	35	+60	75	Play-off
2	SV Hemelingen (Note: SV Hemelingen did not apply for a Regionalliga license.)	30	23	4	3	111	31	+80	73	
3	OSC Bremerhaven	30	20	4	6	86	40	+46	64	
4	TV Eiche Horn	30	20	2	8	69	37	+32	62	
5	Brinkumer SV	30	16	5	9	81	50	+31	53	
6	BTS Neustadt	30	16	2	12	86	73	+13	50	
7	Union Bremen	30	15	3	12	72	65	+7	48	
8	Werder Bremen III	30	12	3	15	60	67	−7	39	
9	ESC Geestemünde	30	10	5	15	56	81	−25	35	
10	Leher Turnerschaft	30	10	4	16	52	62	−10	34	
11	SG Aumund-Vegesack	30	11	1	18	55	79	−24	34	
12	FC Oberneuland	30	10	6	14	65	58	+7	36	
13	Vatan Sport Bremen	30	9	2	19	49	91	−42	29	
14	TS Woltmershausen	30	6	5	19	43	90	−47	23	
15	Habenhauser FV (R)	30	7	1	22	42	97	−55	22	Relegation
16	ATSV Sebaldsbrück (R)	30	4	4	22	44	110	−66	16	Relegation

Source: Soccerway
(C) Champions; (R) Relegated

=== Hamburg ===
Pos	Team	Pld	W	D	L	GF	GA	GD	Pts	Qualification or relegation
1	ETSV Hamburg (Note: ETSV Hamburg did not apply for a Regionalliga license.) (C)	34	26	5	3	126	27	+99	83	
2	Eimsbütteler TV (O, P)	34	24	6	4	101	44	+57	78	Play-off
3	TuS Dassendorf	34	24	4	6	101	34	+67	76	
4	Victoria Hamburg	34	18	10	6	83	48	+35	64	
5	USC Paloma	34	18	7	9	84	50	+34	61	
6	HT 16 Hamburg	34	18	3	13	85	85	0	57	
7	FC Teutonia Ottensen	34	17	1	16	57	66	−9	52	
8	FC Süderelbe	34	15	6	13	72	64	+8	51	
9	Niendorfer TSV	34	14	8	12	75	57	+18	50	
10	TSV Sasel	34	14	8	12	91	88	+3	50	
11	TuRa Harksheide	34	14	3	17	65	92	−27	45	
12	TSV Buchholz 08	34	14	2	18	87	80	+7	44	
13	HEBC Hamburg	34	10	8	16	48	66	−18	38	
14	SC Vorwärts-Wacker 04	34	11	5	18	62	85	−23	38	
15	SSG Nikola Tesla	34	11	4	19	70	95	−25	37	
16	Türkiye Wilhelmsburg (R)	34	7	8	19	59	106	−47	29	Relegation
17	SV Halstenbek-Rellingen (R)	34	3	2	29	44	107	−63	11	Relegation
18	SV Curslack-Neuengamme (R)	34	2	2	30	46	162	−116	8	Relegation

Source: Soccerway
(C) Champions; (O) Play-off winners; (P) Promoted; (R) Relegated

=== Hessen ===
Pos	Team	Pld	W	D	L	GF	GA	GD	Pts	Promotion, qualification or relegation
1	Eintracht Frankfurt II (C, P)	34	29	3	2	100	34	+66	90	Promotion to Regionalliga Südwest
2	FC Eddersheim	34	19	7	8	75	50	+25	64	Play-off
3	Eintracht Stadtallendorf	34	16	11	7	57	40	+17	59	
4	FC Gießen	34	18	4	12	74	57	+17	57 (Note: KSV Baunatal, FC Gießen, and Hanau 93 were deducted one point for repeatedly failing to meet referee obligations.)	
5	KSV Baunatal	34	16	8	10	65	51	+14	55	
6	FC TuBa Pohlheim	34	15	9	10	74	62	+12	54	
7	Türk Gücü Friedberg	34	14	7	13	57	59	−2	49	
8	Hünfelder SV	34	15	3	16	68	64	+4	48	
9	1960 Hanau	34	14	5	15	49	66	−17	47	
10	Rot-Weiß Walldorf	34	13	8	13	90	76	+14	47	
11	Darmstadt 98 II	34	13	6	15	75	69	+6	45	
12	VfB Marburg	34	13	6	15	47	58	−11	45	
13	FSV Fernwald	34	11	9	14	59	54	+5	42	
14	SV Hummetroth	34	13	5	16	64	64	0	41 (Note: SV Hummetroth were deducted three points for fielding a non-eligible player in a friendly match.)	
15	CSC 03 Kassel (O)	34	10	9	15	63	82	−19	39	Relegation play-off
16	SC Waldgirmes (R)	34	9	6	19	47	69	−22	33	Relegation
17	SV Adler Weidenhausen (R)	34	5	7	22	44	92	−48	22	Relegation
18	Hanau 93 (R)	34	3	7	24	32	93	−61	15	Relegation

Source: Soccerway
(C) Champions; (O) Play-off winners; (P) Promoted; (R) Relegated

=== Mittelrhein ===
Pos	Team	Pld	W	D	L	GF	GA	GD	Pts	Promotion or relegation
1	SV Bergisch Gladbach 09 (C, P)	30	20	7	3	85	28	+57	67	Promotion to Regionalliga West
2	SV Eintracht Hohkeppel	30	20	4	6	86	36	+50	64	
3	Siegburger SV 04	30	19	5	6	75	34	+41	62	
4	SSV Merten	30	18	6	6	80	28	+52	60	
5	VfL 08 Vichttal	30	18	5	7	80	43	+37	59	
6	FC Wegberg-Beeck	30	15	6	9	62	35	+27	51	
7	SpVg Frechen	30	16	2	12	66	54	+12	50	
8	SSV Bornheim	30	14	4	12	65	56	+9	46	
9	TuS Königsdorf	30	14	4	12	53	54	−1	46	
10	Fortuna Köln II	30	13	6	11	62	47	+15	45	
11	1. FC Düren	30	11	5	14	49	59	−10	38	
12	Hennef 05	30	11	2	17	45	66	−21	35	
13	SpVg Porz	30	7	4	19	58	99	−41	25	
14	Teutonia Weiden (R)	30	4	4	22	25	104	−79	16	Relegation
15	Sportfreunde Düren (R)	30	4	2	24	41	103	−62	14	Relegation
16	FC Pesch (Note: FC Pesch withdrew from the Oberliga Mittelrhein on May 1, 2026. Given that Pesch withdrew in May, their results were not expunged, and all of the matches the club would not be able to play were awarded to the opposing team with a score of 2-0. At the time of their withdrawal, they were in 16th place with 2 wins, 2 draws and 20 losses (8 points) and a goal difference of 26–100 (−74).) (R, F)	30	2	2	26	26	112	−86	0	Relegation

Source: Soccerway
(C) Champions; (F) Forfeit during the season; (P) Promoted; (R) Relegated

=== Niederrhein ===
Pos	Team	Pld	W	D	L	GF	GA	GD	Pts	Promotion or relegation
1	VfB 03 Hilden (C, P)	34	22	3	9	90	48	+42	69	Promotion to Regionalliga West
2	Germania Ratingen	34	19	10	5	86	48	+38	67	
3	KFC Uerdingen 05	34	19	6	9	58	43	+15	63	
4	SpVg Schonnebeck	34	17	10	7	81	47	+34	61	
5	SC St. Tönis	34	16	7	11	80	55	+25	55	
6	TSV Meerbusch	34	15	5	14	49	60	−11	50	
7	SV Blau-Weiß Dingden	34	12	9	13	45	48	−3	45	
8	VfL Jüchen-Garzweiler	34	11	11	12	47	42	+5	44	
9	Sportfreunde Baumberg	34	12	8	14	58	66	−8	44	
10	Schwarz-Weiß Essen	34	13	5	16	53	62	−9	44	
11	1. FC Monheim	34	12	7	15	48	56	−8	43	
12	SV Sonsbeck	34	12	6	16	47	59	−12	42	
13	FC Büderich	34	12	6	16	62	77	−15	42	
14	Adler Union Frintrop	34	12	5	17	57	57	0	41	
15	Holzheimer SG (R)	34	10	11	13	49	62	−13	41	Relegation
16	1. FC Kleve (R)	34	11	8	15	43	62	−19	41	Relegation
17	VfB Homberg (R)	34	10	6	18	51	61	−10	36	Relegation
18	SV Biemenhorst (R)	34	8	3	23	55	106	−51	27	Relegation

Updated to match(es) played on 3 June 2026. Source: Soccerway
(C) Champions; (P) Promoted; (R) Relegated

=== Niedersachsen ===
Pos	Team	Pld	W	D	L	GF	GA	GD	Pts	Promotion, qualification or relegation
1	Atlas Delmenhorst (C, P)	30	20	6	4	69	29	+40	66	Promotion to Regionalliga Nord
2	Germania Egestorf	30	18	5	7	63	36	+27	59	Play-off
3	Heeslinger SC	30	17	4	9	72	47	+25	55	
4	VfV 06 Hildesheim	30	16	1	13	53	55	−2	49	
5	SV Wilhelmshaven	30	14	6	10	47	38	+9	48	
6	Lüneburger SK Hansa	30	12	12	6	46	43	+3	48	
7	SC Spelle-Venhaus	30	12	10	8	61	47	+14	46	
8	SV Meppen II	30	12	8	10	45	40	+5	44	
9	TuS Bersenbrück	30	11	9	10	66	67	−1	42	
10	BSV Schwarz-Weiß Rehden	30	12	6	12	48	49	−1	42	
11	Verden 04	30	11	5	14	50	49	+1	38	
12	Eintracht Braunschweig II	30	11	5	14	54	57	−3	38	
13	MTV Wolfenbüttel (R)	30	11	5	14	59	67	−8	38	Relegation
14	TSV Wetschen (R)	30	6	9	15	53	65	−12	27	Relegation
15	Lupo Martini Wolfsburg (R)	30	3	6	21	27	71	−44	15	Relegation
16	SV Holthausen Biene (R)	30	3	5	22	40	93	−53	14	Relegation

Source: Soccerway
(C) Champions; (P) Promoted; (R) Relegated

=== Nordost-Nord ===
Pos	Team	Pld	W	D	L	GF	GA	GD	Pts	Promotion or relegation
1	Tasmania Berlin (C, P)	30	22	1	7	85	32	+53	67	Promotion to Regionalliga Nordost
2	Lichtenberg 47	30	19	4	7	77	45	+32	61	
3	Hansa Rostock II	30	18	3	9	66	49	+17	57	
4	Neustrelitz	30	16	5	9	62	38	+24	53	
5	SG Union Klosterfelde	30	15	7	8	59	43	+16	52	
6	SV Siedenbollentin	30	13	8	9	59	59	0	47	
7	Eintracht Mahlsdorf	30	13	7	10	50	49	+1	46	
8	Makkabi Berlin	30	14	2	14	57	55	+2	44	
9	FC Anker Wismar	30	12	5	13	56	55	+1	41	
10	Sparta Lichtenberg	30	12	3	15	77	72	+5	39	
11	Optik Rathenow	30	9	10	11	41	47	−6	37	
12	Tennis Borussia Berlin	30	10	6	14	44	58	−14	36	
13	Berliner AK 07	30	11	3	16	50	66	−16	36	
14	Dynamo Schwerin (R)	30	7	10	13	41	47	−6	31	Relegation
15	SD Croatia Berlin (R)	30	5	4	21	39	81	−42	19	Relegation
16	FC Viktoria 1889 Berlin (R)	30	3	4	23	42	109	−67	13	Relegation

Source: Soccerway
(C) Champions; (P) Promoted; (R) Relegated

=== Nordost-Süd ===
Pos	Team	Pld	W	D	L	GF	GA	GD	Pts	Promotion or relegation
1	RSV Eintracht (C, P)	30	20	8	2	61	29	+32	68	Promotion to Regionalliga Nordost
2	SC Freital	30	19	2	9	57	28	+29	59	
3	VFC Plauen	30	18	5	7	52	28	+24	59	
4	VfB Auerbach	30	14	9	7	51	37	+14	51	
5	Germania Halberstadt	30	14	6	10	49	44	+5	48	
6	Halle 1896	30	13	7	10	68	45	+23	46	
7	Budissa Bautzen	30	12	9	9	57	46	+11	45	
8	VfB Krieschow	30	12	7	11	48	42	+6	43	
9	VfB Empor Glauchau	30	11	7	12	46	52	−6	40	
10	Union Sandersdorf	30	10	9	11	40	41	−1	39	
11	Einheit Wernigerode	30	9	6	15	41	58	−17	33	
12	FC Einheit Rudolstadt	30	9	6	15	39	60	−21	33	
13	1. FC Lok Stendal (N)	30	8	6	16	41	59	−18	30	
14	FC Grimma (R)	30	8	4	18	47	73	−26	28	Relegation
15	Bischofswerdaer FV 08 (R)	30	6	7	17	36	61	−25	25	Relegation
16	1. SC 1911 Heiligenstadt (R)	30	4	8	18	33	63	−30	20	Relegation

Source: Soccerway
(C) Champions; (N) Switching to the Nord group; (P) Promoted; (R) Relegated

=== Rheinland-Pfalz/Saar ===
Pos	Team	Pld	W	D	L	GF	GA	GD	Pts	Qualification
1	1. FC Kaiserslautern II (C, P)	34	25	6	3	97	38	+59	81	Promotion to Regionalliga Südwest
2	FK Pirmasens	34	24	6	4	103	43	+60	78	Play-off
3	FC Emmelshausen-Karbach	34	20	5	9	82	57	+25	65	
4	TuS Koblenz	34	17	10	7	75	44	+31	61	
5	Engers 07	34	17	4	13	66	61	+5	55	
6	Rot-Weiß Koblenz	34	16	4	14	68	55	+13	52	
7	FC Hertha Wiesbach	34	16	2	16	67	71	−4	50	
8	Wormatia Worms	34	14	6	14	73	60	+13	48	
9	TSV Gau-Odernheim	34	13	9	12	48	47	+1	48	
10	FC Cosmos Koblenz	34	14	7	13	54	57	−3	46 (Note: Cosmos Koblenz were deducted 3 points for a substitution error in their home match against Rot-Weiß Koblenz.)	
11	SV Gonsenheim	34	14	3	17	54	58	−4	45	
12	SV Auersmacher	34	12	5	17	52	72	−20	41	
13	FV 07 Diefflen	34	11	6	17	64	79	−15	39	
14	Eisbachtaler Sportfreunde	34	10	7	17	62	69	−7	37	
15	Arminia Ludwigshafen (R)	34	10	7	17	55	80	−25	37	Relegation
16	FV Dudenhofen (R)	34	9	9	16	52	66	−14	36	Relegation
17	SC Idar-Oberstein (R)	34	8	8	18	52	90	−38	32	Relegation
18	FV Eppelborn (R)	34	3	2	29	36	113	−77	11	Relegation

Source: Soccerway
(C) Champions; (P) Promoted; (R) Relegated

=== Schleswig-Holstein ===
Pos	Team	Pld	W	D	L	GF	GA	GD	Pts	Qualification or relegation
1	SV Todesfelde (C, O, P)	30	26	2	2	80	24	+56	77 (Note: SV Todesfelde were deducted 3 points for not showing up for the away game at TSV Nordmark Satrup.)	Play-off
2	Holstein Kiel II	30	20	5	5	83	26	+57	65	
3	Kilia Kiel	30	19	4	7	87	37	+50	61	
4	SV Eichede	30	16	11	3	59	30	+29	59	
5	VfR Neumünster	30	15	5	10	61	55	+6	50	
6	Heider SV	30	14	5	11	59	58	+1	47	
7	PSV Neumünster	30	13	5	12	68	62	+6	44	
8	1. FC Phönix Lübeck II	30	12	6	12	65	68	−3	42	
9	TSV Nordmark Satrup	30	12	4	14	44	51	−7	40	
10	Kaltenkirchener TS	30	10	6	14	47	55	−8	36	
11	TuS Rotenhof	30	9	7	14	51	70	−19	34	
12	MTSV Hohenwestedt	30	8	5	17	48	64	−16	29	
13	Oldenburger SV	30	8	5	17	61	86	−25	29	
14	Eutiner SV 1908 (R)	30	7	6	17	32	65	−33	27	Relegation
15	Inter Türkspor Kiel (R)	30	6	2	22	31	77	−46	20	Relegation
16	Preußen Reinfeld (R)	30	4	4	22	38	86	−48	16	Relegation

Source: Soccerway
(C) Champions; (O) Play-off winners; (P) Promoted; (R) Relegated

=== Westfalen ===
Pos	Team	Pld	W	D	L	GF	GA	GD	Pts	Promotion, qualification or relegation
1	Westfalia Rhynern (C, P)	36	25	7	4	96	38	+58	82	Promotion to Regionalliga West
2	Wattenscheid 09 (P)	36	23	11	2	78	28	+50	80	Promotion to Regionalliga West
3	ASC 09 Dortmund	36	22	9	5	81	41	+40	75	
4	Lippstadt 08	36	20	10	6	63	29	+34	70	
5	Preußen Münster II	36	21	5	10	80	49	+31	68	
6	1. FC Gievenbeck	36	14	8	14	61	56	+5	50	
7	Arminia Bielefeld II	36	13	10	13	57	57	0	49	
8	Victoria Clarholz	36	12	10	14	54	63	−9	46	
9	Eintracht Rheine	36	11	11	14	53	63	−10	44	
10	Verl II	36	11	9	16	51	64	−13	42	
11	SV Schermbeck 2020	36	10	10	16	53	60	−7	40	
12	TSG Sprockhövel	36	11	7	18	59	69	−10	40	
13	SpVgg Erkenschwick	36	10	10	16	48	67	−19	40	
14	SpVgg Vreden	36	11	6	19	52	68	−16	39	
15	TuS Ennepetal	36	11	5	20	44	75	−31	38	
16	TuS Hiltrup	36	9	10	17	42	57	−15	37	
17	Rot Weiss Ahlen (R)	36	9	7	20	42	77	−35	34	Relegation
18	SG Finnentrop/Bamenohl (R)	36	8	9	19	51	87	−36	33	Relegation
19	Türkspor Dortmund (R)	36	12	4	20	60	77	−17	31 (Note: Türkspor Dortmund were deducted 9 points for going into administration.)	Relegation

Source: Soccerway
(C) Champions; (P) Promoted; (R) Relegated
