= VfL Wolfsburg II =

- Full name: Verein für Leibesübungen Wolfsburg II
- Dissolved: 2021
- Ground: AOK Stadion
- Capacity: 5,200

VfL Wolfsburg II was a German association football team from the city of Wolfsburg, Lower Saxony. It was the reserve team of VfL Wolfsburg. The team's greatest success was two league championships in the tier four Regionalliga Nord, in 2013–14 and 2015–16, which entitled it to take part in the promotion round to the 3. Liga.

The team made four appearances in the first round of the German Cup, the DFB-Pokal, in 2001–02, 2002–03, 2003–04 and 2005–06, reaching the second round in 2001–02, after eliminating Borussia Dortmund, and in 2003–04, after eliminating Energie Cottbus in the first.

The team was dissolved at the end of the 2020–21 season.

== History ==
The team first rose above local amateur level when it won promotion to the tier five Verbandsliga Niedersachsen-Ost in 1995, where it played for the next four seasons, then under the name of VfL Wolfsburg Amateure.

Wolfsburg rose above regional Lower Saxony level after winning the tier five Verbandsliga Niedersachsen-Ost in 1998–99. It played the next five seasons in the Oberliga Niedersachsen/Bremen as an upper table side before winning the league in 2003–04 and earning promotion to the Regionalliga Nord for the first time. Relegated from this level after just a single season Wolfsburg entered the Oberliga Nord for two seasons before winning it in 2006–07 and returning to the Regionalliga.

In the early 2000s the team made four appearances in the first round of the German Cup, the DFB-Pokal, in 2001–02, 2002–03, 2003–04 and 2005–06. In 2001–02 it eliminated Borussia Dortmund in the first round and, in 2003–04, Energie Cottbus, but was knocked out in the second on both occasions.

The 2007–08 season was the last of the Regionalliga as a tier three league, the 3. Liga having been introduced at the end of season. Despite finishing 19th, the team was allowed to remain in the Regionalliga Nord because of a general league restructuring. Wolfsburg played in the Regionalliga from 2008 onwards, finishing runners-up in 2010, 2011 and 2015 and winning the league in 2014, 2016 and 2019. The league wins entitled the club to participate in the promotion play-offs to the 3. Liga, but the team lost on aggregate to SG Sonnenhof Großaspach in 2014, Regionalliga Bayern champions Jahn Regensburg in 2016 and Regionalliga Bayern champions Bayern Munich II in 2019.

On 10 May 2021, it was announced that the team would be dissolved at the end of the 2020–21 season after failing to achieve promotion to the 3. Liga. The club stated that it wanted to focus on its cooperation with the Austrian club St. Pölten to develop its talents instead.

== Honours ==
The club's honours:

- Regionalliga Nord
  - Champions: 2013–14, 2015–16, 2018–19
  - Runners: 2009–10, 2014–15, 2018–20
- Oberliga Nord
  - Champions: 2006–07
- Oberliga Niedersachsen/Bremen
  - Champions: 2003–04
- Verbandsliga Niedersachsen-Ost
  - Champions: 1998–99
- Lower Saxony Cup
  - Winners: 2002, 2003

== Recent seasons ==
The recent season-by-season performance of the club:

Season	Division	Tier	Position
2003–04	Oberliga Niedersachsen/Bremen	IV	1st ↑
2004–05	Regionalliga Nord	III	17th ↓
2005–06	Oberliga Nord	IV	3rd
2006–07	Oberliga Nord	IV	1st ↑
2007–08	Regionalliga Nord	III	19th
2008–09	Regionalliga Nord	IV	5th
2009–10	Regionalliga Nord	IV	2nd
2010–11	Regionalliga Nord	IV	2nd
2011–12	Regionalliga Nord	IV	4th
2012–13	Regionalliga Nord	IV	3rd
2013–14	Regionalliga Nord	IV	1st
2014–15	Regionalliga Nord	IV	2nd
2015–16	Regionalliga Nord	IV	1st
2016–17	Regionalliga Nord	IV	3rd
2016–17	Regionalliga Nord	IV	3rd
2018–19	Regionalliga Nord	IV	1st
2019–20	Regionalliga Nord	IV	2nd
2020–21	Regionalliga Nord – Group South	IV	9th

- With the introduction of the 3. Liga in 2008 as the new third tier, below the 2. Bundesliga, all leagues below dropped one tier.

↑ Promoted	↓ Relegated

== Players ==
=== Current squad ===
As of 23 August 2022

Note: Flags indicate national team as defined under FIFA eligibility rules; some limited exceptions apply. Players may hold more than one non-FIFA nationality.

No.	Pos.	Nation	Player
1	GK	AUT	Juri Kirchmayr
13	GK	GER	Ariel Eisenhammer
3	DF	DEN	Christian Östergaard
4	DF	GER	Felix Lange
5	MF	GER	Philipp Heller
6	MF	GER	Kofi Jeremy Amoako
7	MF	GER	Davis Boateng
8	MF	GER	Lasse Homann
9	FW	GER	Sean Busch
10	MF	CZE	Lukas Ambros
11	MF	GER	Max Herrmann
12	GK	GER	Flynn Schönmottel
13	FW	GER	Joâo Pinto

No.	Pos.	Nation	Player
14	DF	GER	Vin Kastull
15	DF	GER	Adrian Doci
16	DF	GER	Manuel Braun
17	FW	GER	Melvin Berkemer
18	FW	ITA	Matteo Mazzone
20	MF	GER	Matthew Meier
21	FW	GER	Aurel Wagbe
22	DF	POR	Jesse Costa
23	DF	GER	Toni Bastin
24	MF	GER	Arda Dugramaci
25	DF	GER	Robin Fuhrmann
26	FW	BIH	Marko Brkic
27	GK	GER	Melvin Poms
