= TS Woltmershausen =

German association football club

- Full name: Turn- und Sportverein Woltmershausen von 1890 e.V.
- League: Bremen-Liga (V)
- 2025–26: Bremen-Liga, 14th of 16
- Website: https://ts-woltmershausen.de
Home colours	Away colours

TS Woltmershausen is a German association football club from Woltmershausen, a district in the centre of the city of Bremen.

== History ==
=== Predecessor sides ===
The origins of the club lie with predecessor sides Turnverein 1890 Woltmershausen, Fußballverein 1900 Woltmershausen, and the workers' club Arbeiterturnverein Woltmershausen, which was established in 1896 and renamed Allgemeinen Turnverein Woltmershausen in 1909. TV and ATV were merged in 1933 when the Nazis banned left-leaning workers' clubs as politically undesirable.

FV had its first successes in the 1920s playing in the Bezirksliga Weser-Jade (II). From 1943 to 1945, the team was part of the Gauliga Weser-Ems (I), the war-weakened successor to the Gauliga Niedersachsen (I), which was one of 13 regional circuits established in the 1933 reorganization of German football under the Third Reich. Only a single season of play was completed in the Gauliga Weser-Ems before competition collapsed just two or three games into the 1944–45 season because of the war. FV finished in second place in one of the league's three divisions, but did not take part in play for the overall division title.

=== Postwar and formation of TS ===
After the conflict, ATV reemerged in late 1945, followed by TV 1890 in the spring of 1946. The former membership of FV 1900 joined ATV to create Sportverein Woltmershausen von 1896 on 8 March 1947. This club won its way into the Amateurliga Bremen (II) in 1949 where they competed until being sent down in 1959. They returned to Amateurliga play in 1961 and earned their best result in 1967, finishing third behind the second team sides of Werder Bremen and Bremerhaven 93. However, they were demoted again at the end of a poor 1970–71 campaign and in 1974 entered into a union with TV 1890 to create the current day club Turn- und Sportverein Woltmershausen von 1890. They had a short three season turn in what had become the third tier Amateurliga before rebounding in 1981. Since then, the club has spent most of its time as part of the Amateurliga as that league eventually became a sixth tier circuit - now known as the Bremen-Liga - through multiple reorganizations of German football.

== Other sports departments ==
In addition to its football side, TS has a long history of participation in other sports and today also has departments for handball, running, Taekwando. dancing, tennis, table tennis, gymnastics and a variety of fitness activities.

The women footballers compete in the Verbandsliga Bremen (IV) and took part in their first DFB-Pokal (German Cup) tournament in 2011–12.

The handball team advanced to the 2. Bundesliga Nord in 1993 where they spent two seasons before settling into Regionalliga (III) play. In 2007, they slipped to the Oberliga (IV).
