= TSV Kornburg =

- Full name: Turn- und Sportverein Kornburg e.V.
- Founded: January 1, 1932; 94 years ago
- Ground: Sportgelände Kellermannstraße
- Capacity: 1,700 seats
- League: Bayernliga Nord (V)
- 2025–26: Bayernliga Nord, 12th of 18
- Website: https://www.tsv-kornburg.de/
Home colours	Away colours	Third colours

TSV Kornburg is a German amateur football club based in Kornburg, a residential district in the south of Nuremberg, Bavaria. The club was founded as Turn- und Sportverein Kornburg e.V. in January 1932. TSV Kornburg currently plays in Bayernliga Nord, the highest amateur football league in Bavaria and the fifth tier of the German football league system.

== Achievements ==
TSV Kornburg has achieved several notable accomplishments throughout its history. These achievements include:

- Season 2021/2022: Promoted to Oberliga.
- Season 2016/2017: Promotion to the 5th division.
