= Eintracht Mahlsdorf =

German football club

BSV Eintracht Mahlsdorf
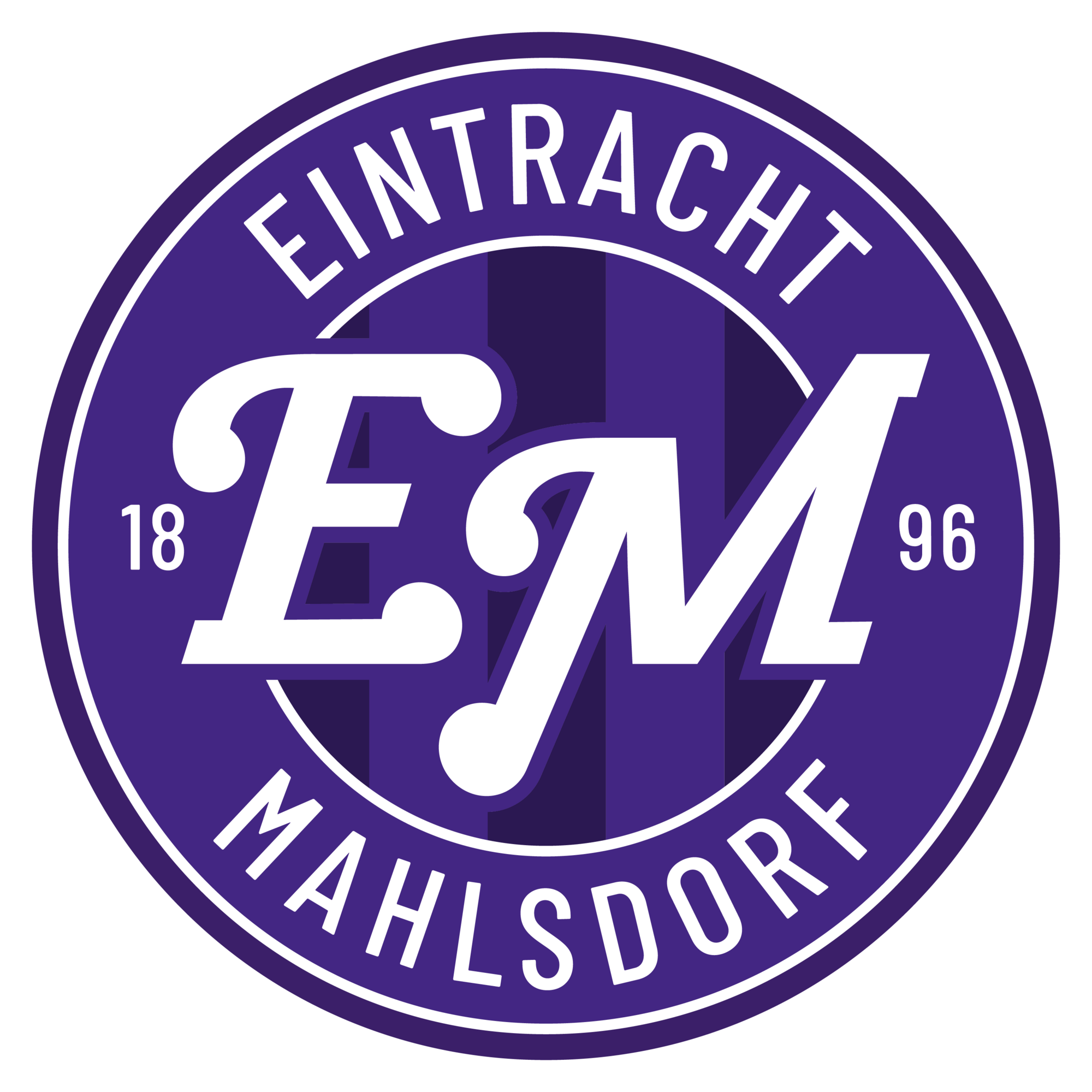
- Full name: Berliner Sportverein Eintracht Mahlsdorf e.V.
- Founded: 1896
- Ground: Sportplatz Am Rosenhag
- Capacity: 2,500
- League: Oberliga NOFV-Nord (V)
- 2025–26: Oberliga NOFV-Nord, 7th of 16
Home colours	Away colours

Eintracht Mahlsdorf is a German football club from the eastern city district of Mahlsdorf in Berlin.

== History ==
Eintracht Mahlsdorf was initially established in 1896 as a gymnastics club by local youth, but not formally registered until the following year. Football was popular within the club from its earliest days and a football department was organized in 1912 with the team was taking part in established local competition by 1916. World War I resulted in play being suspended in most parts of the country and not resumed until 1919. In 1923 many of Eintracht's footballers abandoned the lilac-and-white to play in the black-and-yellow of newly formed Adler Mahlsdorf. With the rise to power of the Nazis in the 1930s, many clubs, including Eintracht and Adler, were disbanded and their memberships organized into sports associations sanctioned by the regime.

Following World War II the club played in the football competition that emerged in Soviet-occupied East Germany. Prior to the isolation of East Berlin from the rest of the city Mahlsdorf advanced past Hertha Zehlendorf and Spandauer SV to the quarter-finals of the 1949 in Berlin Cup where they were put out by Berliner SV.

Beginning in 1955 the side played as Medizin Lichtenberg as it was identified with the larger city district that included Mahlsdorf and, like other East German clubs, associated with a specific industry. The club was renamed Medizin Marzahn in 1982 – once again for a larger city district – and then in 1987 was dubbed Medizin Berlin 1896.

After German reunification the club reclaimed its traditional name and registered as an independent entity on 3 June 1999. Following the merger of the football competitions of the two Germanys in 1991, Mahlsdorf played in the fourth tier Verbandsliga Berlin but was immediately relegated to the Landesliga Berlin (V) before slipping still further into local league play. The team eventually returned to the Landesliga and after a second-place result in 2002–03 made their way back to what was then the fifth tier Verbandsliga Berlin. From 2006 on Mahlsdorf played in the Berlin-Liga (VI) again. In 2021 they won the Berlin Championship and got relegated to east-German Oberliga Nordost.

== Stadium ==
The club plays its home matches at the Sportplatz Am Rosenhag which has a capacity of 2500.
