= FC Oberneuland =

German football club

- Full name: Fußball-Club Oberneuland von 1948 e. V.
- Founded: 1948
- Ground: Marko Mock Arena
- Capacity: 5,050
- Owner: Karen Micheli
- Chairman: Birger Winkelvoss
- Manager: Daniel Prause
- League: Bremen-Liga (V)
- 2025–26: Bremen-Liga, 12th of 16
- Website: fcoberneuland.de
Home colours	Away colours

FC Oberneuland Bremen von 1948 is a German association football club from the Oberneuland quarter of Bremen, founded on 13 April 1948 in the local inn Zum Dorfkrug as Fußball-Club Oberneuland von 1948. In addition to football, the club has departments for basketball and gymnastics.

== History ==
For most of its history FC Oberneuland played as a lower-tier local side until breaking out in the early 1990s and rising rapidly through a series of title wins. By 1994, the club had advanced to the Verbandsliga Bremen (V) and, after a second-place result, went on to capture the division title the following season. They were promoted to the Oberliga Niedersachsen/Bremen (IV) where they played until 2004 when they were dropped to fifth-tier play after league re-organization. Oberneuland returned to fourth division play in the Oberliga Nord in 2006 after their second Verbandsliga title.

Bremer Pokal (Bremen Cup) wins in 1993 and 2003 led to the club's participation in the DFB-Pokal (German Cup) where they were eliminated in the first round on both occasions. In 2008, a third Bremer Pokal win again put the team into the German Cup tournament where they beat TuS Koblenz in the opening round before being eliminated by VfL Wolfsburg.

Before the end of the 2012–13 Regionalliga season, the club went bankrupt and following re-organisation was given a place in the sixth tier Landesliga 2013–14. Another relegation next which saw them concede the most goals (169) and earn the fewest points (5) in their existence dropped them to the seventh tier Bezirksliga. A championship in the Bezirksliga in 2015 took the club back up to the Landesliga where another title meant promotion to the Bremen-Liga.

== Current squad ==
As of 18 August 2022

Note: Flags indicate national team as defined under FIFA eligibility rules; some limited exceptions apply. Players may hold more than one non-FIFA nationality.

No.	Pos.	Nation	Player
5	DF	GER	Denis Nukić
7	FW	GER	Daniel Hofmann
8	MF	GER	Ishan Sataev
9	MF	GER	Mert Ates
11	DF	GER	Nicolai Gräpler
11	MF	GER	Tom Trebin
15	DF	GER	Denis Kolodziej
16	MF	GER	Boris Koveschnikov
17	FW	GAM	Muhammad Sey
18	DF	GER	Luca Seidel
19	FW	GER	Omar Sillah

No.	Pos.	Nation	Player
21	DF	GER	Lars Tyca
22	MF	GER	Daniel Block
23	FW	GER	Tyron Leon Haake
24	DF	GER	Abel Maruschke Agbe
24	FW	GER	Felix Bauhus
26	GK	GER	Bennet Glinder
28	MF	GER	Jonas Kühl
29	FW	GER	Nico Poplawski
31	FW	GER	Salif Kujabi
32	GK	GER	Niklas Griesmeyer
33	GK	GER	Jonas Horsch

== Honours ==
The club's honours:

- Bremen-Liga (V)
  - Champions: 1996, 2006, 2012, 2020, 2023
- Landesliga Bremen (VI)
  - Champions: 1994, 2016
- Bezirksliga Bremen
  - Champions: 1993, 2015
- Kreisliga A Bremen
  - Champions: 1992
- Bremer Pokal (Tiers III–VI)
  - Winners: 1993, 2003, 2008, 2009, 2010, 2011, 2012, 2019, 2020, 2023

== Stadium ==
The team plays its home matches in the Sportpark Vinnenweg, which has a capacity of 3,500.

== Former coaches ==
- Mike Barten
- Torsten Gütschow
- Wolfgang Sidka
- Kristian Arambasic
