= Leher Turnerschaft =

German football club

Leher TS
- Full name: Leher Turnerschaft von 1898 e. V.
- Founded: 1898
- Ground: LTS Arena
- Capacity: 2,000
- League: Bremen-Liga (V)
- 2025–26: Bremen-Liga, 10th of 16
- Website: https://lts-bremerhaven.de

Leher Turnerschaft is a German football club from the Lehe district of Bremerhaven in the state of Bremen. Founded in 1898, it plays in the Bremen-Liga in the fifth tier of the German football league system.

The origins of the club are in the establishment of the worker's sportclub Arbeiter-Turnverein Frei Heil Lehe which was later renamed Freie Turnerschaft Lehe und Umgebung. In 1911, SpVgg Leherheide split off and would later become SFL Bremerhaven. The football department of TS Lehe followed, becoming independent in 1913 as Freie Sportvereinigung Lehe.

As a worker's club, FSV Lehe was part of the Arbeiter-Turn- und Sportbund (ATSB or Workers' Gymnastics and Sports Federation), a national German sports organization active between 1893 and 1933. The ATSB actively promoted leftist political views built around class struggle and nationalism. The Nazi regime regarded worker's and faith-based clubs as politically undesirable and this led to the disbanding of clubs of this type in 1933. FSV avoided dissolution by abandoning the ATSB and reorganizing as Leher Turnerschaft. They later (1943–45) played alongside Bremerhaven 93 as the wartime side (Kriegspielgemeinschaft) KSG Bremerhaven.

In 2016–17, the team won the Bremen Cup for the first time, defeating Bremer SV 9–8 on penalties after a goalless draw in the final on 25 May. In doing so, the team qualified for the DFB-Pokal for the first time. In the first round on 12 August 2017, they hosted Bundesliga team 1. FC Köln at OSC Bremerhaven's Nordsee-Stadion and lost 5–0.
