= Eintracht Nordhorn =

German football club

- Full name: Sportverein Eintracht Nordhorn e.V.
- Founded: 1945; 81 years ago
- Ground: Stadion am Heideweg
- Capacity: 7,500
| Home colours | Away colours |

Eintracht Nordhorn is a German association football club from the city of Nordhorn, Lower Saxony. The club was founded in 1945 as Sportverein Nordhorn and adopted the name Eintracht Nordhorn in 1947. A separate football club known as SV Concordia Nordhorn briefly split away in 1953, but rejoined the parent association four years later. The football side was part of a larger sports club that had departments for basketball, table tennis, tennis, and volleyball.

== History ==
The team climbed up out of local league play into the Amateurliga Niedersachsen (II) in the early 50s and by the middle of the decade was playing the first division Oberliga Nord. They earned only lower table results and were relegated in 1960. Eintracht returned briefly to the top flight two seasons later, but following the formation of the Bundesliga, Germany's first professional league, in 1963, settled firmly into what had become third division play in the Amateurliga. The club's best results came in the 70s; they captured the Niedersachsenpokal (Lower Saxony Cup) in 1974, earned a second-place result in the Amateurliga in 1975, and made appearances in DFB Pokal (German Cup) play in 1975, 1978, 1979, and 1981. This was followed by a slide that ended in relegation to the Verbandsliga Niedersachsen (IV) in 1981. The club made a re-appearance in third-tier competition in the Oberliga Nord in 1990 but fell to the Verbandsliga Niedersachsen West (V) by 1994. Since then Eintracht has largely played fourth division football in the Oberliga Niedersachsen/Bremen or Oberliga Nord, with the exception of a three-season turn in the Regionalliga Nord (III) in the late 90s. In 2012 Einracht slid to Landesliga Weser-Ems (VI) and in 2014 slid again to Bezirksliga Weser-Ems (VII). Due to insolvency concerns, in 2015 Eintracht merged with Türkischer Verein Nordhorn to become SV Eintracht TV Nordhorn.

Forward Gert Goolkate was the top goalscorer in Oberliga play across the country in the 2004–05 season with 44 goals.

== Stadium ==
Eintracht plays its home matches in the Eintracht-Stadion am Heideweg which has a capacity of 7,500.

== Honours ==
The club's honours:

- Lower Saxony Cup
  - Winners: 1974, 2008
- Oberliga Niedersachsen/Bremen
  - Champions: 1997
- Verbandsliga Niedersachsen-West
  - Champions: 1953, 1954, 1955, 1995
