= SFL Bremerhaven =

German football club

- Full name: Sport Freizeit Leherheide Bremerhaven e.V.
- Founded: 1975
- Ground: Heidjer Arena; Bremerhaven, Bremen, Germany
- Capacity: 1,000
- Manager: (Germany) Eric Schürhaus
- League: Bremen-Liga
- Website: https://www.sfl-bremerhaven.de
Home colours	Away colours

SFL Bremerhaven is a German football club based in Bremerhaven, Bremen. It was founded in 1975 and plays in the Bremen-Liga, fifth tier on German football.

== Current squad ==
Note: Flags indicate national team as defined under FIFA eligibility rules; some limited exceptions apply. Players may hold more than one non-FIFA nationality.

No.	Pos.	Nation	Player
1	GK	(Germany) GER	Marco Theulieres
5	MF	(Germany) GER	Meiko Gagelmann
6	DF	(Germany) GER	Toni Hennen
7	MF	(Germany) GER	Timo Struppe
8	MF	(Germany) GER	Simon Aulich
9	MF	(Germany) GER	Christian Bär
10	MF	(Germany) GER	Oleg Naumov
11	MF	(Germany) GER	Eric Beyer-Franzen
12	GK	(Germany) GER	Maximilian Klobke
13	FW	(Germany) GER	Dominique-Francesco Schmiedel
14	DF	(Germany) GER	Tommi Felker
15	DF	(Germany) GER	Birk Virkus

No.	Pos.	Nation	Player
17	FW	(Germany) GER	Mirko Tatje
18	MF	(Germany) GER	Torge-Marvin Kück
19	DF	(Germany) GER	Bennet Zander
20	MF	(Germany) GER	Marcel da Graça Lopes
21	DF	(Germany) GER	Lorris Felker
22	FW	(Germany) GER	Eduard Kimmel
24	GK	(Germany) GER	Piet Birreck
25	DF	(Germany) GER	Tjark Virkus
26	DF	(Germany) GER	Arne Birreck
27	MF	(Germany) GER	Julian Bünting
31	MF	(Germany) GER	Viktor Felker
