= SV Gonsenheim =

German football club

- Full name: Sportverein 1919 Gonsenheim e.V.
- Founded: 1919
- Ground: Waldsportanlage Gonsenheim
- Chairman: Joachim Mayer
- League: Oberliga Rheinland-Pfalz/Saar (V)
- 2025–26: Oberliga Rheinland-Pfalz/Saar, 11th of 18
Home colours	Away colours

SV Gonsenheim is a German association football club from the district of Gonsenheim in the city of Mainz, Rhineland-Palatinate. It was established in 1919 as Fußball-Klub Viktoria Gonsenheim and on 14 September 1919 merged with Fußball-Club Germania 1915 Gonsenheim to form Sportverein Gonsenheim.

== History ==
Following World War II, sports and football clubs across the country were disbanded by occupying Allied authorities as part of the process of denazification. A new club known as Sportgemeinde Gonsenheim was formed out of the former memberships of SV and Turnverein Gonsenheim in 1946. The team was part of the postwar first division Oberliga Südwest-Nord where they played just two seasons as a lower-tier side before choosing to leave the top-flight. In 1949, SV and TV split to become separate clubs again.

In the late 1960s, SV broke through to the third tier Amateurliga Südwest where they played 5 seasons between 1964 and 1971. In 2003, they were promoted to the Verbandsliga Südwest (V) and earned a strong third-place finish in their first season there. However, it would not be until 2010 that SV would advance to the Oberliga Südwest (V), a league renamed to Oberliga Rheinland-Pfalz/Saar in 2012.

== Honours ==
The club's honours:

- Verbandsliga Südwest
  - Champions: 2010
- Landesliga Südwest
  - Champions: 2005

== Recent seasons ==
The recent season-by-season performance of the club:

Season	Division	Tier	Position
2002–03	Landesliga Südwest	V	12th
2003–04	Landesliga Südwest	V	5th
2004–05	Landesliga Südwest	V	1st ↑
2005–06	Verbandsliga Südwest	V	3rd
2006–07	Verbandsliga Südwest	V	3rd
2007–08	Verbandsliga Südwest	V	3rd
2008–09	Verbandsliga Südwest	VI	5th
2009–10	Verbandsliga Südwest	VI	1st ↑
2010–11	Oberliga Südwest	V	15th
2011–12	Oberliga Südwest	V	8th
2012–13	Oberliga Rheinland-Pfalz/Saar	V	14th
2013–14	Oberliga Rheinland-Pfalz/Saar	V	9th
2014–15	Oberliga Rheinland-Pfalz/Saar	V	4th
2015–16	Oberliga Rheinland-Pfalz/Saar	V	11th
2016–17	Oberliga Rheinland-Pfalz/Saar	V	

- With the introduction of the Regionalligas in 1994 and the 3. Liga in 2008 as the new third tier, below the 2. Bundesliga, all leagues below dropped one tier. In 2012 the Oberliga Südwest was renamed Oberliga Rheinland-Pfalz/Saar.

↑ Promoted	↓ Relegated
