= TSV Grolland =

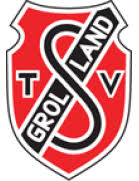
- Full name: Turn- und Sportverein Grolland e.V.
- Nickname: TSV Grolland
- Founded: 1950
- Ground: Olympiastadion an der Ochtum
- Capacity: 25,000
- Manager: Jannes Bösche
- League: Kreisliga
- 2018/19: 15th (Bezirksliga)
- Website: https://www.tsvgrolland.de
Home colours

TSV Grolland is a sports club from the district of Grolland in Bremen, Germany. The club's first football team played in the Bremen-Liga from 2014 to 2018.

The district of Grolland, located in Huchting, experienced rapid growth since 1938. The club was founded in 1950, and its clubhouse was established at Osterstader Straße 7, along with the sports fields in the area. The current chairman is Dr. Stephan Schenk.

The club currently offers various sports in seven departments, including Budō / self-defense, football, bowling, swimming, table tennis, gymnastics, and volleyball.

Facilities of the club include the Ochtumbrücke sports field, and a multipurpose room at Osterstader Strasse 7. They also train at the Brakkämpe school gymnasium in Grolland, Butjadinger Straße in Neustadt, and Obervielander Straße 76 in Huchting.
