= FC Bremerhaven =

German football club

- Full name: Fussball Club Bremerhaven von 1899 e.V.
- Founded: 1899
- Dissolved: 2012
- Ground: Zollinlandstadion
- Capacity: 3,000
- League: defunct
Home colours	Away colours

FC Bremerhaven was a German association football club located in Bremerhaven, Bremen.

== History ==
The club was founded 1 June 1899 and soon merged with VfB 1899 Lehe to become FC Bremerhaven-Lehe. In 1917 FC merged with SC Sparta Bremerhaven to become Bremerhaven-Lehe SC Sparta until, in 1919, VfB left to resume play as a separate team.

After World War II occupying Allied authorities ordered the disbanding of most organizations in Germany, including sports and football clubs. A combined Bremerhaven side was formed late in 1945 as SG Lehe-Nord which was renamed ATS Bremerhaven in 1947. Two years later in 1949 SC Sparta Bremerhaven re-established an independent club out of ATS, followed by the re-establishment of VfB Lehe in 1953. ATS took on its original identity as FC Bremerhaven in 1992.

The club's best recent appearances have been in the Regionalliga Nord (III) in 1994–95 and 1999–2000 and in the Oberliga Niedersachsen/Bremen (IV) through the late 90s and in 2000–01 and 2002–03. They currently play in the Bremen-Liga (V), where they finished first in 2007–08 but were denied a Regionalliga licence.

The club was dissolved on 30 June 2012, its football section joined Sparta Bremerhaven, which continues to play in the Bremen-Liga.

== Honours ==
The club's honours:

- Oberliga Niedersachsen/Bremen (IV)
  - Runners-up: 1999
- Verbandsliga Bremen (IV-V)
  - Champions: 1993, 1994, 2002, 2008
- Bremer Pokal
  - Winners: 1996, 2005, 2006
