= TuS Esens =

German sports club

- Full name: Turn- und Sportverein Esens
- Founded: 2010 April 12; 16 years ago
- Ground: Stadion an der Peldemühle
- Capacity: 3,500
- Manager: Ralf Backhaus
- League: Bezirksliga Weser-Ems (VII)
- Website: Website

TuS Esens is a German association football club based in Esens, Lower Saxony. The team currently plays in the Bezirksliga Weser-Ems, a seventh tier of the German football league system.
