= Bremer SV =

German football club

- Full name: Bremer Sportverein 1906 e. V.
- Founded: 1 January 1906; 120 years ago
- Ground: Stadion am Panzenberg
- Capacity: 5,000
- President: Dr. Peter Warnecke
- Head coach: Ralf Voigt
- League: Regionalliga Nord (IV)
- 2025–26: Regionalliga Nord, 7th of 18
- Website: https://www.bremer-sportverein.de
Home colours	Away colours

Bremer SV is a German association football club, founded in 1906 and based in the city of Bremen. The club play their home games at the Panzenberg Stadium and currently competes in the fourth-tier Regionalliga Nord.

== History ==
Bremer SV was formed on 1 January 1906 as BBV Sport but renamed itself to the current name in 1920.

The club played at topflight Gauliga Niedersachsen several times: 1933 to 1935, 1939–40 and 1942 to 1944. In 1947 post-Second World War play the club became part of the new tier one Oberliga Nord and played there until relegated again in 1955. It returned to this league for a season in 1961–62 but was relegated to the Amateurliga Bremen, again. After the introduction of the Bundesliga in 1963 the club won promotion to the tier two Regionalliga Nord in 1965 but was relegated once more two seasons later. A new Oberliga Nord was established in 1974, now in the third tier and Bremer SV became a founding member but was relegated after one season. The club made two returns to the league, from 1978 to 1981 and 1986 to 1992. Since then the club has mostly been playing in the leagues of Bremen, unable to return to the higher levels.

The club won the Bremen-Liga in four consecutive seasons (2013–14 to 2016–17), but each time failed to win promotion in the play-off round. They were finally promoted to the Regionalliga Nord in 2022 after winning another Bremen-Liga title.

The club lost 12–0 to Bayern Munich in the first round of the 2021–22 DFB-Pokal.

The club is known for its humorous self-marketing and colourful and creative support from the stands. The fans tend to be politically left-leaning.

== Honours ==
- Bremen-Liga
  - Champions: 1955–56, 1957–58, 1960–61, 1964–65, 1977–78, 1982–83, 1984–85, 1985–86, 2006–07, 2013–14, 2014–15, 2015–16, 2016–17, 2018–19, 2021–22
- Bremer Pokal
  - Winners: 1979–80, 1984–85, 1985–86, 1990–91, 2013–14, 2014–15, 2015–16, 2020–21, 2021–22, 2023–24

== Players ==
=== Current squad ===
As of 8 September 2026

Note: Flags indicate national team as defined under FIFA eligibility rules; some limited exceptions apply. Players may hold more than one non-FIFA nationality.

No.	Pos.	Nation	Player
1	GK	LUX	Lucas Fox
2	DF	KOS	Floni Selimi
3	DF	JPN	Ryusei Hosokawa
4	DF	GER	Denis Koldzic
5	DF	GER	Anthony Nwachukwu
6	DF	GER	Fyn Luca Ebeling
7	FW	GAM	Ebrima Camara
8	MF	GER	Luca Schlake
10	MF	GER	Vedat Tunc
11	FW	GER	Bastian Redecker
13	MF	GER	Justin Bretgeld
14	FW	GER	Clinton Helmdach
16	MF	SWE	Daniel Michel
17	MF	GER	Luis Klappich

No.	Pos.	Nation	Player
18	DF	GER	Jan-Maximilian Scharf
19	DF	GER	Ian Scheffler
20	DF	NED	Juul Timmermans
21	MF	GER	Mussa Tasmin
22	GK	GER	Tobias Duffner
23	MF	GER	Wedat Bezek
24	FW	GER	Fritz Kleiner
27	MF	GER	Alessio Arambasic
30	GK	GER	Nico Wiede
33	GK	GER	Noah Hasch
34	MF	GER	Anton Utermann
37	DF	AUT	Jean de Chatrie Doegl
-	MF	GER	Ömer Aslan

=== Out on loan ===
Note: Flags indicate national team as defined under FIFA eligibility rules; some limited exceptions apply. Players may hold more than one non-FIFA nationality.

No.	Pos.	Nation	Player
25	DF	GER	Justus Warnking (at TuS Bersenbrück until 30 June 2027)
