= SG Aumund-Vegesack =

German football club

- Full name: Sportgemeinschaft Aumund-Vegesack von 1892 e.V.
- Founded: 1892
- Ground: Stadion Vegesack
- League: Bremen-Liga (V)
- 2025–26: Bremen-Liga, 12th of 16
- Website: https://sav-fussball.de
Home colours	Away colours

SG Aumund-Vegesack is a German football club from the northern district of Vegesack in the city of Bremen in the state Free Hanseatic City of Bremen. The club was established sometime in 1892 as Spiel- und Sport Blumenthal and on 11 May 1912 was renamed Fußballverein Blumenthal. Part of the membership left to form Blumenthaler Sportverein on 6 June 1919 while later that year those that remained partnered with Sportverein Vegesack to create Spielvereinigung Aumund-Vegesack. SpVgg was in turn joined by SuS Vegesack in 1929. Today the multi-sport club has a membership of 2,000 which includes 400 footballers.

== History ==
After World War II, occupying Allied authorities dissolved most organizations in the country, including sports and football clubs. Many were soon reformed and in 1946 SpVgg Aumund-Vegesack resumed play in the Amateurliga Bremen (II) where they earned a string of mid-table finishes over the course of the next handful of seasons.

In 1953, they adopted their current name and following a 15th-place result in 1955–56 slipped to local lower-level competition. SG currently play in the tier five Bremen-Liga.

== Honours ==
The club's honours:

- Bremen Cup
  - Winners: 2013
