= Brinkumer SV =

German football club

- Full name: Brinkumer Sportverein von 1924 e. V.
- Founded: 1924
- Ground: BSV Arena
- Capacity: 2,200
- Chairman: Lars Benjamin Facklam
- Manager: Iman Bi-Ria
- League: Bremen-Liga (V)
- 2025–26: Bremen-Liga, 5th of 16
- Website: https://www.brinkumersv.net
| Home colours | Away colours |

Brinkumer SV is a German association football club, based in the town of Stuhr, which was founded in 1924. They play their home games at the BSV Arena. They currently participate in the Bremen-Liga.

== Honours ==
The club's honours:

- Bremen-Liga
  - Champions: 2009
- Landesliga Bremen
  - Champions: 2003

== Former players ==
- (Morocco) Mourad Bounoua, 2006–2007
- (United States) Darren Spicer, 2006–2007
