= OSC Bremerhaven =

German sports club

- Full name: Olympischer-Sport-Club Bremerhaven von 1972 e. V.
- Founded: 1972
- Ground: Nordseestadion
- Capacity: 10,000
- League: Bremen-Liga (V)
- 2025–26: Bremen-Liga, 3rd of 16
- Website: https://www.osc-bremerhaven.de
Home colours	Away colours

OSC Bremerhaven is a German sports club based in Bremerhaven, in the federal state of Bremen.

== History ==
The club was founded in 1972 as Olympischer Sport-Club Bremerhaven in a merger of various local football clubs including ATS Bremerhaven, which has roots going back to 1859, Polizei Sportverein, TuS Bremerhaven 93, and the Judo-Klub. They are the largest sports club in the city, claiming some 4500 members, but football is not their primary focus. Their minor league side currently competes at the tier V level after a decade spent in tiers II and III, from the mid-70s through to the mid-80s.

OSC can make a strong claim to being the successor to TuS Bremerhaven 93, which was officially disbanded in 1974. While many members of TuS 93 joined OSC, others continued to field a separate football team until 1977. In 1991, the football players left OSC en masse to form FC Bremerhaven, leaving OSC with just a rump side. The TuS 93 was a quite successful side in northern German football, playing in the Oberliga Nord (I) from 1948 to 1963 and then in the Regionalliga Nord (II) until 1974.

Nowadays the club plays in the highest league in the state, the Bremen-Liga.

== Honours ==
=== TuS Bremerhaven 93 ===
- Oberliga Nord (I)
  - Runners-up: 1955
- Amateurliga Bremen (II)
  - Champions: 1948

=== OSC Bremerhaven ===
- Oberliga Nord (III)
  - Champions: 1977
  - Runners-up: 1979
- Bremer Pokal
  - Winners: 1981, 1984
