= 1975–76 Oberliga =

Tournament details
- Country: Germany
- Teams: 36

Final positions
- Champions: SC Union 06 Berlin Arminia Hannover
- Runner-up: Hertha BSC Amateure VfL Wolfsburg

Tournament statistics
- Matches played: 612

The 1975–76 season of the Oberliga was the second season of the Oberliga as a tier-three league. The original post-Second World War Oberligas, then as tier-one leagues, had been disestablished after the 1962–63 season, when the Bundesliga was introduced.

The Oberliga was organised in two regional divisions, the Oberliga Nord and the Oberliga Berlin, with the two league champions, as well as the runners-up of the Oberliga Nord, earning the right to play-off for promotion to the level above, the 2. Bundesliga. Parallel to the two Oberligas, Amateurligas and Verbandsligas existed in the other parts of Germany at this level.

A similar league, the DDR-Oberliga, existed in East Germany, set at the first tier of the East German football league system. The 1975–76 DDR-Oberliga was won by BFC Dynamo.

== Overview ==
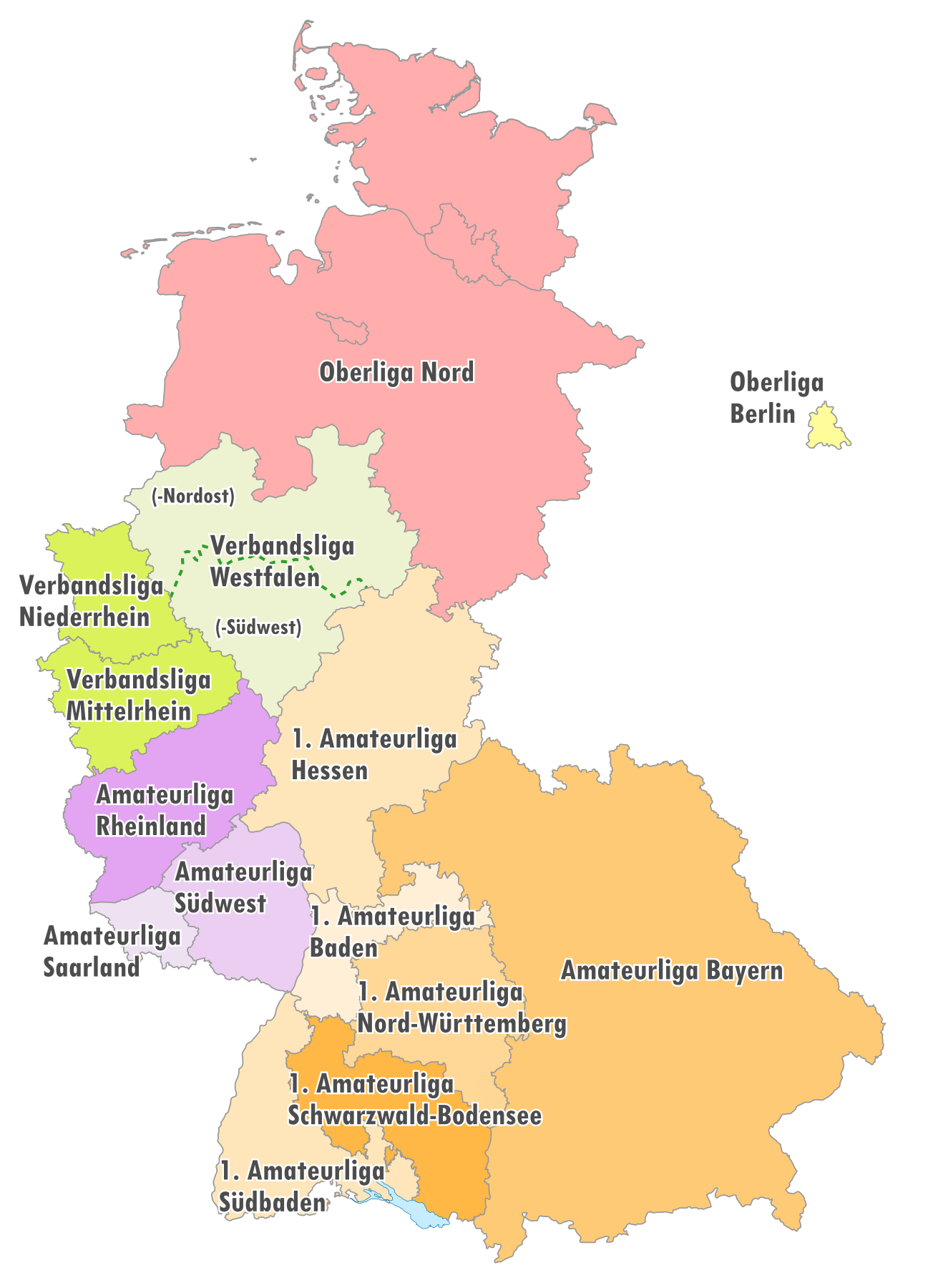
The tier three football leagues in West Germany in 1975–76

The championship of the Oberliga Nord was won by Arminia Hannover, previous seasons runners-up, while VfL Wolfsburg finished runners-up, two points behind. Both clubs won promotion to the 2. Bundesliga and, as a consequence, no team was relegated from the league. The best-placed team in the league from each of the four regional federations, except the league champions and runners-up who played in the promotion round to the 2. Bundesliga instead, qualified for the German amateur football championship. VfB Oldenburg (Lower Saxony) and Concordia Hamburg (Hamburg) both reached the semi-finals where they were knocked-out. In the decider for third place Concordia won 3–1. Holstein Kiel (Schleswig-Holstein) was knocked-out in the first round while Blumenthaler SV (Bremen) advanced to the second where they lost to Oldenburg.

The Oberliga Berlin was won by SC Union 06 Berlin but the club failed to win promotion to the 2. Bundesliga. League runners-up Hertha BSC Amateure entered the German amateur championship but was knocked-out by eventual champions SV Holzwickede in the first round.

| Oberliga | Champions | Promoted | Championship | Relegated | Teams |
| Oberliga Berlin | SC Union 06 Berlin | — | Hertha BSC Amateure | SC Staaken BBC Südost Preußen Wilmersdorf: 1. Traber FC; 1. FC Neukölln | 18 |
| Oberliga Nord | Arminia Hannover | Arminia Hannover VfL Wolfsburg | VfB Oldenburg (3rd) Concordia Hamburg (7th) Blumenthaler SV (8th) Holstein Kiel (13th) | — | 18 |

- The numbers behind the clubs qualified for the German amateur championship from the Oberliga Nord indicate the league placing in 1975–76.

== Promotion play-off to the 2. Bundesliga ==
Thirteen teams took part in the promotion round to the 1976–77 2. Bundesliga, six in the north and seven in the south. Two teams, the champions of Hesse and the runners-up of Bavaria, were promoted directly without entering the play-off.

=== North ===
==== Group A ====
In group A the champions of the Amateurliga Mittelrhein and Amateurliga Niederrhein as well as the runners-up of the Oberliga Nord competed for two promotion spots:

| Pos | Team | Pld | W | D | L | GF | GA | GD | Pts | Promotion, qualification or relegation |
|---|---|---|---|---|---|---|---|---|---|---|
| 1 | VfL Wolfsburg (P) | 4 | 2 | 0 | 2 | 7 | 6 | +1 | 4 | Promotion to 1976–77 2. Bundesliga Nord |
| 2 | Bonner SC (P) | 4 | 1 | 2 | 1 | 5 | 5 | 0 | 4 | Promotion to 1976–77 2. Bundesliga Nord |
| 3 | 1. FC Bocholt | 4 | 1 | 2 | 1 | 5 | 6 | −1 | 4 | |

Source: Weltfussball.de (in German)
Rules for classification: 1) Points; 2) Goal difference; 3) Goals scored;
(P) Promoted

==== Group B ====
In group B the champions of the Amateurliga Westfalen (played in two divisions), Oberliga Berlin and Oberliga Nord competed for two promotion spots:

| Pos | Team | Pld | W | D | L | GF | GA | GD | Pts | Promotion, qualification or relegation |
|---|---|---|---|---|---|---|---|---|---|---|
| 1 | Arminia Hannover (P) | 4 | 2 | 1 | 1 | 10 | 4 | +6 | 5 | Promotion to 1976–77 2. Bundesliga Nord |
| 2 | SC Herford (P) | 4 | 2 | 1 | 1 | 8 | 3 | +5 | 5 | Promotion to 1976–77 2. Bundesliga Nord |
| 3 | SC Union 06 Berlin | 4 | 1 | 0 | 3 | 2 | 13 | −11 | 2 | |

Source: Weltfussball.de (in German)
Rules for classification: 1) Points; 2) Goal difference; 3) Goals scored;
(P) Promoted

=== South ===
The champions of the Amateurliga Hessen, KSV Baunatal, and the runners-up of the Amateurliga Bayern, FV Würzburg 04, were directly promoted and did not have to enter the promotion round. Bavarian champions FC Wacker München had declined to take up promotion.

==== Group A ====
In group A the champions of the Amateurliga Saarland, Amateurliga Südwest and Amateurliga Rheinland competed for one promotion spot:

| Pos | Team | Pld | W | D | L | GF | GA | GD | Pts | Promotion, qualification or relegation |
|---|---|---|---|---|---|---|---|---|---|---|
| 1 | Eintracht Trier (P) | 4 | 2 | 2 | 0 | 13 | 9 | +4 | 6 | Promotion to 1976–77 2. Bundesliga Süd |
| 2 | Wormatia Worms | 4 | 0 | 3 | 1 | 8 | 9 | −1 | 3 | |
| 3 | Borussia Neunkirchen | 4 | 0 | 3 | 1 | 7 | 10 | −3 | 3 | |

Source: Weltfussball.de (in German)
Rules for classification: 1) Points; 2) Goal difference; 3) Goals scored;
(P) Promoted

==== Group B ====
In group B the champions of the Amateurliga Nordbaden, Amateurliga Südbaden, Amateurliga Württemberg and Amateurliga Schwarzwald-Bodensee competed for one promotion spot:

| Pos | Team | Pld | W | D | L | GF | GA | GD | Pts | Promotion, qualification or relegation |
|---|---|---|---|---|---|---|---|---|---|---|
| 1 | SpVgg Ludwigsburg | 6 | 3 | 2 | 1 | 11 | 7 | +4 | 8 | |
| 2 | BSV Schwenningen (P) | 6 | 2 | 4 | 0 | 9 | 7 | +2 | 8 | Promotion to 1976–77 2. Bundesliga Süd |
| 3 | VfR Mannheim | 6 | 2 | 2 | 2 | 11 | 8 | +3 | 6 | |
| 4 | FC 08 Villingen | 6 | 0 | 2 | 4 | 3 | 12 | −9 | 2 | |

Source: Weltfussball.de (in German)
Rules for classification: 1) Points; 2) Head-to-head; 3) Decider;
(P) Promoted

A decider had to be played between Ludwigsburg and Schwenningen as both clubs were on equal points and the two games between them had both been draws:

| Team 1 | Score | Team 2 |
|---|---|---|
| BSV Schwenningen | 4–0 | SpVgg Ludwigsburg |
