= 1974–75 Oberliga =

Tournament details
- Country: Germany
- Teams: 36

Final positions
- Champions: Spandauer SV VfB Oldenburg
- Runners-up: Hertha Zehlendorf Arminia Hannover

Tournament statistics
- Matches played: 612

The 1974–75 season of the Oberliga was the inaugural season of the Oberliga as a tier-three league. The Oberligas, then as tier-one leagues, had been disestablished after the 1962–63 season, when the Bundesliga was introduced.

The Oberliga was organised in two regional divisions, the Oberliga Nord and the Oberliga Berlin, with the league champions, and the runners-up of the Oberliga Nord, earning the right to play-off for promotion to the level above, the 2. Bundesliga. Parallel to the two Oberligas, Amateurligas and Verbandsligas existed in the other parts of Germany at this level.

A similar league, the DDR-Oberliga, existed in East Germany, set at the first tier of the East German football league system. The 1974–75 DDR-Oberliga was won by FC Carl Zeiss Jena.

== Overview ==
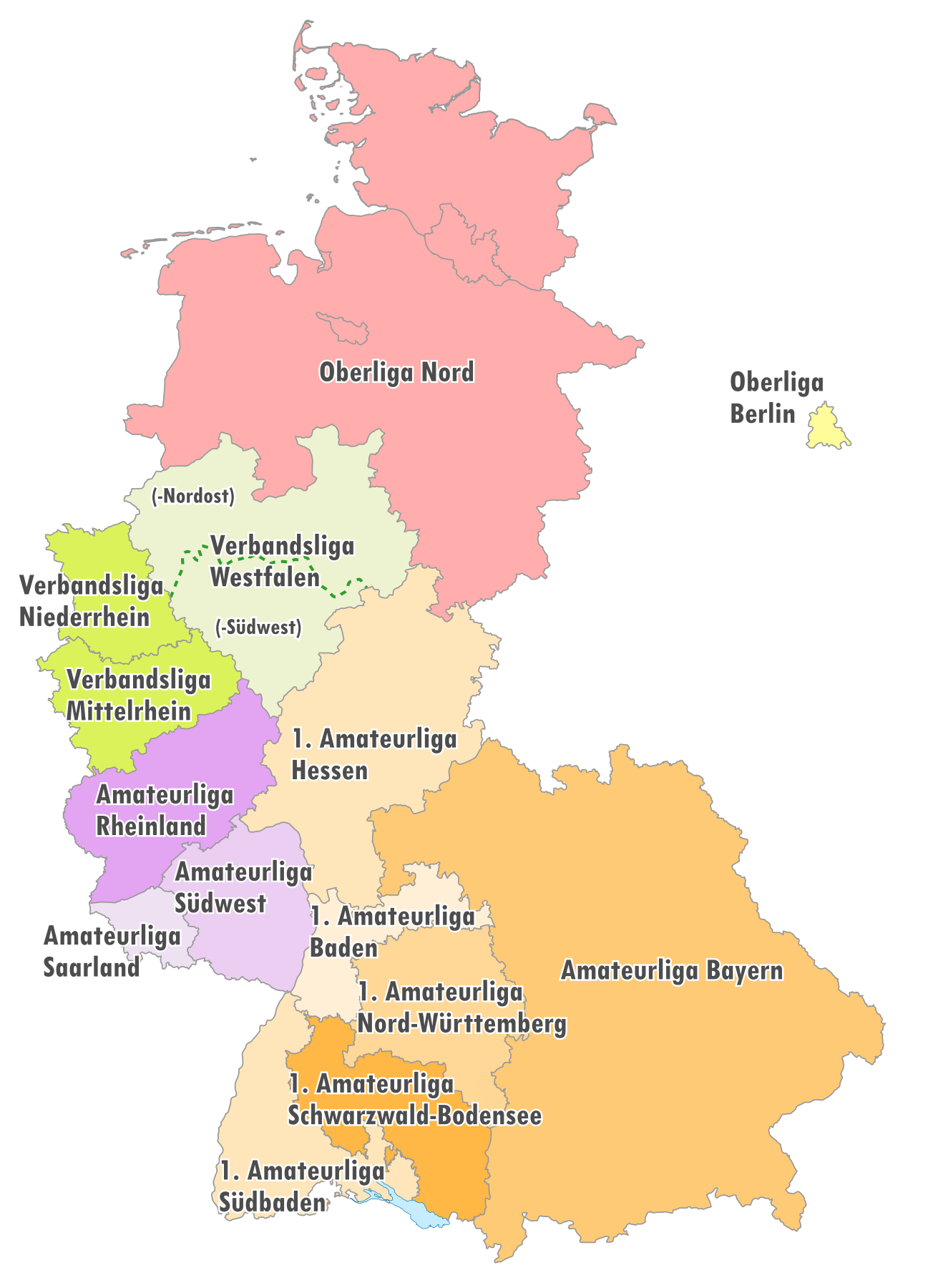
The tier three football leagues in West Germany in 1974–75

The new Oberliga Nord replaced the Amateurliga Bremen, Landesliga Hamburg, Amateurliga Niedersachsen and Landesliga Schleswig-Holstein at the third level, with the latter dropping down to the fourth tier as a consequence. Ten of the eighteen clubs in the new Oberliga came from the Regionalliga Nord, a second-tier league that had been disbanded at the end of the 1973–74 season and been replaced by the northern division of the 2. Bundesliga. Three clubs came from the Amateurliga Niedersachsen, two each from the Amateurliga Bremen and Landesliga Hamburg and one club from the Landesliga Schleswig-Holstein.

The inaugural championship of the Oberliga Nord was won by VfB Oldenburg while Arminia Hannover finished runners-up, two points behind. Both clubs failed to win promotion to the 2. Bundesliga in the promotion round but Arminia would succeed the following season while Oldenburg had to wait until 1979–80. SC Victoria Hamburg, fourth in the Oberliga Nord and best-placed team from Hamburg, qualified for the German amateur football championship, where it reached the final but lost 3–0 to VfR Oli Bürstadt. Of the other qualified teams from the league, Itzehoer SV (Schleswig-Holstein) reached the second round while TuS Bremerhaven 93 (Bremen) and SV Meppen (Lower Saxony) were knocked-out in the first.

In the new Oberliga Berlin, which replaced the Amateurliga Berlin at this level in West Berlin, eighteen clubs competed in the inaugural season. Nine of those came from the Regionalliga Berlin, a second-tier league like the Regionalliga Nord, while the other nine came from the Amateurliga. Spandauer SV became the first champions of the league and won promotion to the 2. Bundesliga. League runners-up Hertha Zehlendorf entered the German amateur championship but was knocked-out by Schwarz-Weiss Essen in the first round.

Oberliga	Champions	Promoted	Championship	Relegated	Teams
Oberliga Berlin	Spandauer SV	Spandauer SV	Hertha Zehlendorf	Kickers 1900 Berlin Alemannia 90 Berlin BFC Südring	18
Oberliga Nord	VfB Oldenburg	—	SV Meppen (3rd) SC Victoria Hamburg (4th) TuS Bremerhaven 93 (6th) Itzehoer SV (8th)	Phönix Lübeck SpVgg Flensburg 08 Heider SV Bremer SV SC Poppenbüttel	18

- The numbers behind the clubs qualified for the German amateur championship from the Oberliga Nord indicate the league placing in 1975–76.

== Promotion play-off to the 2. Bundesliga ==
Thirteen teams took part in the promotion round to the 1975–76 2. Bundesliga, six in the north and seven in the south. Two teams, the champions of Bavaria and Hesse, were promoted directly without entering the play-off.

=== North ===
==== Group A ====
In group A the champions of the Amateurliga Mittelrhein and Amateurliga Niederrhein as well as the runners-up of the Oberliga Nord competed for two promotion spots:

Pos	Team	Pld	W	D	L	GF	GA	GD	Pts	Promotion, qualification or relegation
1	Bayer 04 Leverkusen (P)	4	3	0	1	9	8	+1	6	Promotion to 1975–76 2. Bundesliga Nord
2	SG Union Solingen (P)	4	2	0	2	8	7	+1	4	Promotion to 1975–76 2. Bundesliga Nord
3	Arminia Hannover	4	1	0	3	6	8	−2	2	

Source: Weltfussball.de (in German)
Rules for classification: 1) Points; 2) Goal difference; 3) Goals scored;
(P) Promoted

==== Group B ====
In group B the champions of the Amateurliga Westfalen (played in two divisions), Oberliga Berlin and Oberliga Nord competed for two promotion spots:

Pos	Team	Pld	W	D	L	GF	GA	GD	Pts	Promotion, qualification or relegation
1	Westfalia Herne (P)	4	3	1	0	13	3	+10	7	Promotion to 1975–76 2. Bundesliga Nord
2	Spandauer SV (P)	4	2	0	2	5	11	−6	4	Promotion to 1975–76 2. Bundesliga Nord
3	VfB Oldenburg	4	0	1	3	4	8	−4	1	

Source: Weltfussball.de (in German)
Rules for classification: 1) Points; 2) Goal difference; 3) Goals scored;
(P) Promoted

=== South ===
The champions of the Amateurliga Bayern, Jahn Regensburg, and Amateurliga Hessen, FSV Frankfurt, were directly promoted and did not have to enter the promotion round.

==== Group A ====
In group A the champions of the Amateurliga Saarland, Amateurliga Südwest and Amateurliga Rheinland competed for one promotion spot:

Pos	Team	Pld	W	D	L	GF	GA	GD	Pts	Promotion, qualification or relegation
1	Eintracht Bad Kreuznach (P)	4	4	0	0	18	4	+14	8	Promotion to 1975–76 2. Bundesliga Süd
2	Eintracht Trier	4	1	1	2	8	10	−2	3	
3	ASC Dudweiler	4	0	1	3	3	15	−12	1	

Source: Weltfussball.de (in German)
Rules for classification: 1) Points; 2) Goal difference; 3) Goals scored;
(P) Promoted

==== Group B ====
In group B the champions of the Amateurliga Nordbaden, Amateurliga Südbaden, Amateurliga Württemberg and Amateurliga Schwarzwald-Bodensee competed for one promotion spot:

Pos	Team	Pld	W	D	L	GF	GA	GD	Pts	Promotion, qualification or relegation
1	SSV Reutlingen (P)	6	5	0	1	17	7	+10	10	Promotion to 1975–76 2. Bundesliga Süd
2	Offenburger FV	6	3	0	3	16	15	+1	6	
3	VfR Aalen	6	3	0	3	12	11	+1	6	
4	VfB Eppingen	6	1	0	5	7	19	−12	2	

Source: Weltfussball.de (in German)
Rules for classification: 1) Points; 2) Goal difference; 3) Goals scored;
(P) Promoted
