= 2014–15 Oberliga =

Tournament details
- Country: Germany

Final positions
- Champions: 14 regional winners

Tournament statistics
- Top goal scorer: Sebastian Kinzel (51 goals)

The 2014–15 season of the Oberliga was the seventh season of the Oberligas at tier five of the German football league system and the 41st season overall since reintroduction of the Oberligas in 1974. The regular season started in July 2014 and finished on 14 June 2015, followed by relegation and promotion play-offs.

The Oberliga is organised in fourteen regional divisions with the league champions promoted to the level above, the Regionalligas while the relegated teams drop down to the Verbandsligas and Landesligas.

== Overview ==
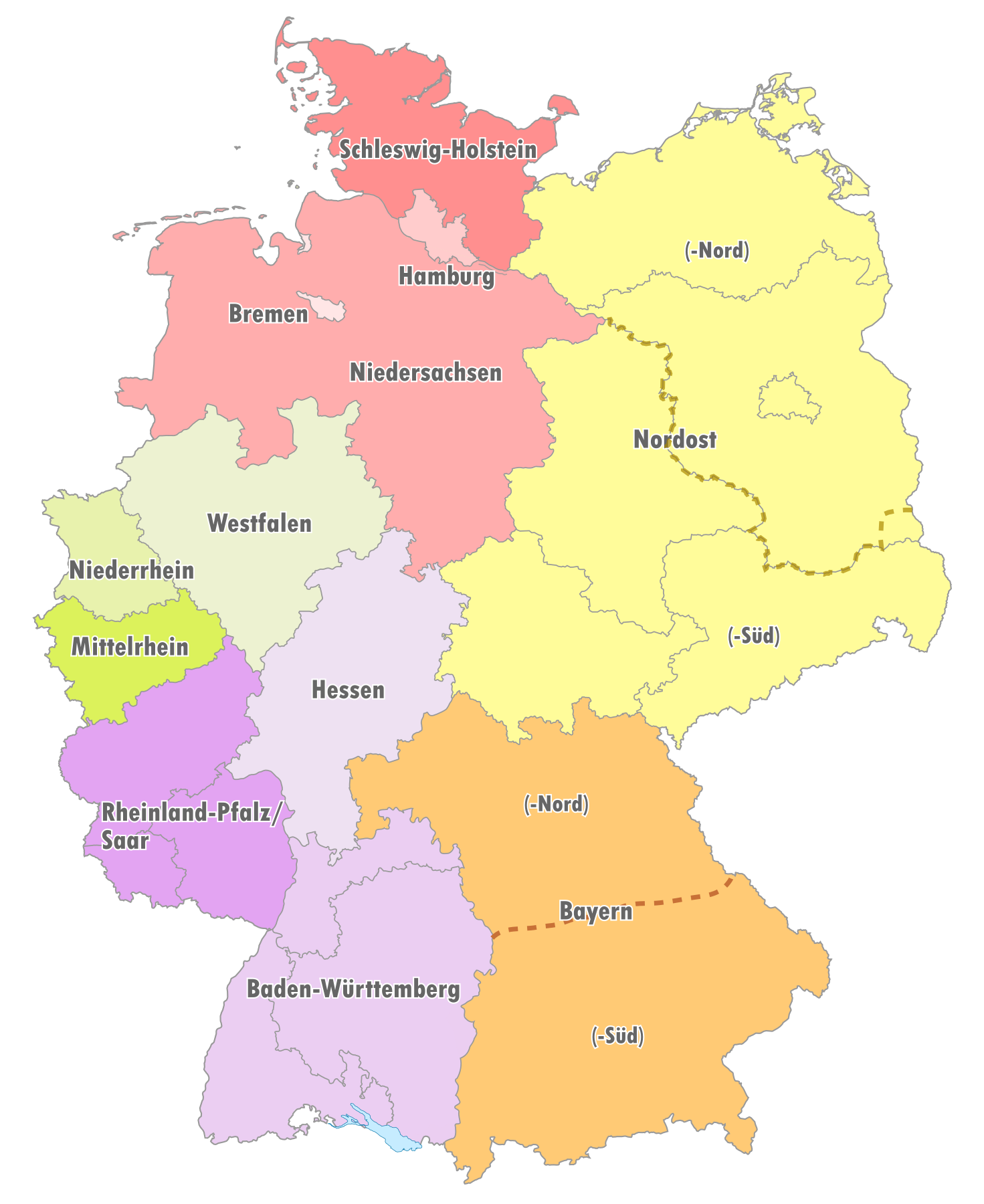
The fourteen Oberligas in Germany in 2014–15

In the 2014–15 season 243 clubs compete in the Oberligas, two less than in the previous season.

Of the fourteen league champions twelve were promoted to the Regionalliga while one, the Oberliga Hamburg champions TuS Dassendorf, declined promotion for the second year running. No club from the Oberliga Hamburg was promoted to the Regionalliga as the only club to apply for a licence, SC Victoria Hamburg, later withdrew for financial reasons after successfully passing the application process. One league champion, Bremer SV of the Bremen-Liga, missed out on promotion in the play-off round, as they had done in 2013–14. Apart from twelve of the fourteen Oberliga champions six runners-up also achieved promotion. Three of them, Bahlinger SC, FC Amberg and VfV 06 Hildesheim, had to go through the promotion round. The other three, Rot Weiss Ahlen, FC Oberlausitz and FC Schönberg 95, were directly promoted.

The two NOFV-Oberligas each had two teams directly promoted to the Regionalliga Nordost as the league was to be expanded from 16 to 18 clubs. Additionally, because 1. FC Magdeburg won promotion to the 3. Liga, a playoff between the two third-placed clubs in the NOFV-Oberligas determined a fifth team, the FSV 63 Luckenwalde, to move up.

The most successful goal scorer of the fourteen Oberligas was Sebastian Kinzel with 51 goals to his name.

The Oberligas also saw an exodus of reserve teams with seven clubs withdrawing their second team, those being VfR Aalen II, SV Wehen II, Erzgebirge Aue II, Chemnitzer FC II, Dynamo Dresden II, 1. FC Saarbrücken II and SpVgg Unterhaching II. The last two of those finished the season on relegation ranks and would have been relegated regardless. Apart from these seven teams another three non-reserve sides resigned from the Oberligas while 38 clubs were relegated.

The only team to complete the 2014–15 Oberliga season undefeated was Bremer SV, with a record of 25 wins, five draws and no defeat. The club scored 118 goals during the season, second only to Brinkumer SV with 119. At the other end 1. FC Schwalmstadt was the worst Oberliga club with a record of one win, three draws and 26 defeats, accumulating just six points during the season. The team with the worst defence was SV Türkspor Bremen which conceded 139 goals.

== 2014–15 season ==
The 2014–15 league champions, promoted and relegated teams, the league strength (S), the top scorer and the number of goals they scored, as far as has been determined:

Oberliga	Champions	Promoted	Relegated	S	Top scorer	Goals
Oberliga Baden-Württemberg 2014–15 season	SV Spielberg	SV Spielberg Bahlinger SC	Kickers Pforzheim VfR Aalen II^{†}	18	Fabian Schleusener (BSC)	27
Bayernliga Nord 2014–15 season	Viktoria Aschaffenburg	Viktoria Aschaffenburg FC Amberg	SV Memmelsdorf TSV Neudrossenfeld SpVgg Ansbach DJK Ammerthal FSV Erlangen-Bruck	18	Florian Pieper (VA)	25
Bayernliga Süd 2014–15 season	TSV Rain am Lech	TSV Rain am Lech	SpVgg Unterhaching II^{†} SB/DJK Rosenheim SpVgg Landshut SV Raisting: 1. FC Bad Kötzting	19	Sebastian Kinzel (RAL)	51
Bremen-Liga 2014–15 season	Bremer SV^{¶}	—	SV Türkspor Sparta Bremerhaven^{†}	16	Rafael Brand (OSC)	38
Oberliga Hamburg 2014–15 season	TuS Dassendorf^{‡}	—	FC Elmshorn^{†} Germania Schnelsen SC Vier- und Marschlande	18	Jan-Marc Schneider (H-R) Eric Agyemang (TuS)	29
Hessenliga 2014–15 season	TSV Steinbach	TSV Steinbach	FC Ederbergland: 1. FC Schwalmstadt; SV Wehen II^{†} Rot-Weiß Darmstadt	17	Peter Sprung (SEL)	27
Mittelrheinliga 2014–15 season	FC Wegberg-Beeck	FC Wegberg-Beeck	Germania Erftstadt FC Bergheim TSV Hertha Walheim SC Brühl	16	Benny Hoose (TSC)	23
Niedersachsenliga 2014–15 season	SV Drochtersen/Assel	SV Drochtersen/Assel VfV 06 Hildesheim	TSV Ottersberg Rotenburger SV: 1. SC Göttingen 05	16	Sascha Wald (S-V)	24
NOFV-Oberliga Nord 2014–15 season	Optik Rathenow	Optik Rathenow FC Schönberg 95 FSV 63 Luckenwalde	SV Waren 09^{†} FC Pommern Greifswald	16	Daniel Becker (FSV)	24
NOFV-Oberliga Süd 2014–15 season	RB Leipzig II	RB Leipzig II FC Oberlausitz	Erzgebirge Aue II^{†} Chemnitzer FC II^{†} Dynamo Dresden II^{†}	16	Jan Nezmar (FCO)	33
Oberliga Niederrhein 2014–15 season	SSVg Velbert	SSVg Velbert	SV Sonsbeck Vdsf Nievenheim VfB Homberg Sportfreunde Baumberg	18	Phillip Goris (RWO)	24
Oberliga Rheinland-Pfalz/Saar 2014–15 season	Saar 05 Saarbrücken	Saar 05 Saarbrücken	SG Betzdorf: 1. FC Saarbrücken II; FV Diefflen TuS Mechtersheim SC Idar-Oberstein	18	Can Cemil Oezer (MAI)	24
Schleswig-Holstein-Liga 2014–15 season	TSV Schilksee	TSV Schilksee	FC Angeln 02 TSV Bordesholm FC Dornbreite Lübeck NTSV Strand 08	18	Ian-Prescott Claus (SVE)&(MEL)	34
Oberliga Westfalen 2014–15 season	TuS Erndtebrück	TuS Erndtebrück Rot Weiss Ahlen	VfB Hüls^{†} Westfalia Herne	18	Stefan Oerterer (SVE)	30

- ^{‡} Denotes club declined promotion.
- ^{†} Denotes club withdrew from league.
- ^{¶} Denotes club failed to win promotion.
- ^{#} Denotes club was ineligible for promotion.

== Promotion play-offs ==
Promotion play-offs were held at the end of the season to the Regionalliga Südwest, Regionalliga Bayern, Regionalliga Nord and Regionalliga Nordost:

=== Regionalliga Südwest ===
The runners-up of the Hessenliga, Oberliga Rheinland-Pfalz/Saar and the Oberliga Baden-Württemberg, TSV Lehnerz, SC Hauenstein and Bahlinger SC, competed for one more spot in the Regionalliga. While the first game had been scheduled the second and third depended on the outcome of the first. Bahlinger SC won promotion to the Regionalliga courtesy to a win and a draw.

27 May 2015	TSV Lehnerz	1–1	SC Hauenstein	Stadion Richard-Müller-Straße, Fulda-Lehnerz
19:00	Mistretta 46'	Report	Zimmermann 68'	Attendance: 4,000; Referee: Tobias Fritsch

31 May 2015	Bahlinger SC	0–0	TSV Lehnerz	Kaiserstuhlstadion, Bahlingen
14:00		Report		Attendance: 4,250; Referee: Timo Klein

4 June 2015	SC Hauenstein	0–3	Bahlinger SC	Am Neding, Hauenstein
14:00		Report	Sautner 2', 40' (pen.) Fellanxa 90'	Attendance: 2,500; Referee: Moritz Kühlmeyer

=== Regionalliga Bayern ===
The 15th and 16th placed Regionalliga teams, SV Heimstetten and VfR Garching, play the runners-up of the northern and southern division. In the north this is FC Amberg while, in the south, FC Pipinsried qualified regardless of its place in the table as no other team applied for a Regionalliga licence. The winner of these games then play each other for one more spot in the Regionalliga. Should TSV 1860 Munich have suffered relegation from the 2. Bundesliga its reserve team would be forced to leave the Regionalliga. In this case 17th placed Regionalliga club SV Seligenporten would have entered the relegation play-offs and Heimstetten would have retained their Regionalliga place.

==== First round ====
First leg

3 June 2015	FC Pipinsried	2–6	VfR Garching	Altomünster
18:30 CEST	Goia 26'; Eisgruber 53'	Report	Hauck 30'; Ball 36'; Genkinger 39'; M. Niebauer 42'; Vatany 65'; D. Niebauer 88'	Stadium: Stadion an der Reichertshausener Straße; Attendance: 728; Referee: Lothar Ostheimer

3 June 2015	FC Amberg	1–0	SV Heimstetten	Amberg
18:30 CEST	Ceesay 7'	Report		Stadium: Stadion am Schanzl; Attendance: 1,300; Referee: Steffen Mix

Second leg

7 June 2015	VfR Garching	1–0 (7–2 agg.)	FC Pipinsried	Garching
16:00 CEST	Ball 90'	Report		Stadium: Stadion am See; Attendance: 450; Referee: Stefan Treiber

7 June 2015	SV Heimstetten	0–0 (0–1 agg.)	FC Amberg	Kirchheim
16:00 CEST		Report		Stadium: Sportpark Heimstetten; Attendance: 1,100; Referee: Florian Badstübner

==== Second round ====
The winners of the first round play each other for the one available spot in the Regionalliga:

First leg

10 June 2015	FC Amberg	2–0	VfR Garching	Amberg
18:30 CEST	Werner 33', 56'	Report		Stadium: Stadion am Schanzl; Attendance: 1,668; Referee: Andreas Hartl

Second leg

13 June 2015	VfR Garching	0–1 (0–3 agg.)	FC Amberg	Garching
16:00 CEST		Report	Hempel 84'	Stadium: Stadion am See; Referee: Günter Perl

=== Regionalliga Nord ===
The champions of the Bremen-Liga, Oberliga Hamburg and the Schleswig-Holstein-Liga as well as the runners-up from the Niedersachsenliga enter a play-off for two more spots in the Regionalliga Nord. Eight clubs from these four leagues applied for a Regionalliga licence. As the only club from Hamburg to apply for a licence, SC Victoria Hamburg, later declined participation only three clubs take part in the promotion round, Bremer SV, TSV Schilksee and VfV 06 Hildesheim, with the latter two promoted:

31 May 2015	Bremer SV	2–1	VfV 06 Hildesheim	Panzenberg Stadium, Bremen
14:00	Kurkiewicz 17' Abendroth 80' (pen.)	Report	Rockahr 48'	Attendance: 912; Referee: Franz Bokop

3 June 2015	TSV Schilksee	2–1	Bremer SV	Jürgen-Lüthje-Arena, Kiel
19:30	Schubert 4' Nath 41'	Report	Koweschnikow 89'	Attendance: 832; Referee: Robert Schröder

6 June 2015	VfV 06 Hildesheim	3–2	TSV Schilksee	Friedrich-Ebert-Stadion, Hildesheim
15:00	Rockahr 20' Fahmy 31' Schlichting 87'	Report	Petrick 59' Nath 82'	Attendance: 2,598; Referee: Florian Heft

=== Regionalliga Nordost ===
The third-placed teams from the two NOFV-Oberligas will compete in a two-legged playoff to fill the vacancy left by 1. FC Magdeburg, who won promotion to the 3. Liga.

First leg

17 June 2015	FSV 63 Luckenwalde	0–1	SSV Markranstädt	Werner-Seelenbinder-Stadion, Luckenwalde
19:00 CEST		Report	Ibold 87'	Attendance: 1,036

Second leg

20 June 2015	SSV Markranstädt	1–4 (2–4 agg.)	FSV 63 Luckenwalde	Stadion am Bad, Markranstädt
15:00 CEST	Ibold 68'	Report	Blazynski 1', 55' Robben 38' Schmidt 67'	Attendance: 700
