= Paul Erevbenagie =

German footballer (born 2007)

Personal information
- Full name: Paul Bright Max Erevbenagie
- Date of birth: 19 August 2007 (age 19)
- Place of birth: Bremerhaven, Germany
- Height: 1.81 m (5 ft 11 in)
- Positions: Winger; forward

Team information
- Current team: Werder Bremen
- Number: 38

Youth career
- FC Sparta Bremerhaven
- ESC Geestemünde
- TSV Wulsdorf
- –2022: JFV Bremerhaven
- 2022–2025: Werder Bremen

Senior career*
Years	Team	Apps	(Gls)
2025–	Werder Bremen II	19	(4)
2026–	Werder Bremen	4	(0)

International career^{‡}
2026–	Germany U20	3	(0)
- * Club domestic league appearances and goals as of 24 October 2026 ‡ National team caps and goals as of 3 October 2026

Paul Bright Max Erevbenagie (born 19 August 2007) is a German professional footballer who plays as a winger or forward for Werder Bremen.

== Early life ==
Erevbenagie was born on 19 August 2007 in Bremerhaven, Germany.

== Club career ==
Erevbenagie joined the youth academy of FC Sparta Bremerhaven. Following his stint there, he joined the youth academy of ESC Geestemünde. Subsequently, he joined the youth academy of TSV Wulsdorf.

Afterwards, he joined the youth academy of JFV Bremerhaven. Ahead of the 2022–23 season, he joined the youth academy of Bundesliga side Werder Bremen, helping the club's under-19 team win the 2024–25 DFB-Pokal der Junioren and was promoted to their senior team in 2026.

== International career ==
Erevbenagie is a Germany youth international and has represented the country at under-20 level. On 25 September 2026, he debuted for the Germany national under-20 football team during a 1–0 away win over France in the Under 20 Elite League.

On 3 October 2026, he scored his first goal for the Germany national under-20 football team during a 1–2 away loss to England in the Under 20 Elite League.

== Style of play ==
Erevbenagie plays as a winger or forward. German newspaper Weser Kurier wrote in 2026 that "given enough space, his speed and finishing can... be a real asset".
