= Sören Seidel =

German footballer and manager

Personal information
- Date of birth: 10 October 1972 (age 54)
- Place of birth: Düsseldorf, West Germany
- Height: 1.85 m (6 ft 1 in)
- Positions: Midfielder; forward

Youth career
- Atlas Delmenhorst
- SG Aumund-Vegesack
- Blumenthaler SV

Senior career*
| Years | Team | Apps | (Gls) |
| 1997–1999 | Werder Bremen (A) | 35 | (37) |
| 1997–2000 | Werder Bremen | 12 | (1) |
| 1999 | → Hannover 96 (loan) | 7 | (2) |
| 2000–2002 | MSV Duisburg | 21 | (4) |
| 2002–2004 | Holstein Kiel | 23 | (1) |
| 2004–2005 | Preußen Münster | 27 | (4) |
| 2005–2007 | 1. FC Kleve | 48 | (23) |
| 2007 | SV Lippstadt | 16 | (8) |
| 2007–2009 | Borussia Mönchengladbach II | 59 | (18) |
| 2009–2010 | TSV Ottersberg | 27 | (6) |
| 2010–2011 | Blumenthaler SV | 20 | (11) |
| 2011–2012 | FC Oberneuland | 13 | (2) |
| 2013 | TSV Ottersberg | | |

Managerial career
- 2013–2014: Heeslinger SC
Medal record
Werder Bremen
| Runner-up | DFB-Ligapokal | 1999 |
| Runner-up | DFB-Pokal | 2000 |
- * Club domestic league appearances and goals

Sören Seidel (born 10 October 1972) is a German former professional footballer who played as a midfielder or forward.

== Post-playing career ==
From 2013 to 2014, Seidel was manager of Heeslinger SC who at the time played in the German sixth-tier Landesliga Lüneburg.

== Honours ==
Werder Bremen

- DFB-Pokal finalist: 1999–2000
- DFB-Ligapokal finalist: 1999
