= Bremen Cup =

Bremer Pokal
- Founded: 1951
- Region: Bremen, Germany
- Qualifier for: DFB-Pokal
- Current champions: SV Hemelingen (2025–26)
- Most championships: Werder Bremen II (20 titles)

The Bremer Pokal ('Bremen Cup') is an annual football cup competition, held by the Bremer Fußball-Verband (English: Bremen Football Association). It is one of the 21 regional cup competitions in Germany and a qualifying competition for the German Cup, with the winner of the competition being automatically qualified for the first round of the German Cup in the following season. For sponsorship reasons, the competition is known as the Lotto-Pokal.

The record winners of the competition are SV Werder Bremen II, with 20 titles to their name, but the team is now barred from entering the cup competition, like all reserve teams in Germany since 2008.

== Mode ==
The competition is open for all member clubs of the Bremen FA from the Regionalliga Nord, Bremen-Liga, Landesliga Bremen and the Bezirks- and Kreisligen. Reserve teams are not permitted to compete anymore, making it impossible for SV Werder Bremen II to add to its record total of 20 wins. The competition is staged separately for Bremen and Bremerhaven, with the two regions joining from the quarter-finals onwards, whereby two slots are allocated to Bremerhaven for this round while the remaining six clubs come from Bremen. Regardless of which club has been drawn first, clubs from a lower league will always have home advantage when playing a club from a higher league. In case of a draw after regular time, no extra time is played and the game instead decided through a penalty shoot out.

The cup final is to be held at a neutral venue with the location to be determined by the Bremen FA. The cup winner automatically qualifies for the first round of the German Cup.

== Winners ==
The winners of the competition:

Club	Wins	Years
SV Werder Bremen II	20	1969, 1971, 1976, 1982, 1983, 1987, 1989, 1990, 1992, 1993, 1994, 1995, 1997, 1998, 1999 2000, 2001, 2002, 2004, 2007
FC Oberneuland	10	1993, 2003, 2008, 2009, 2010, 2011, 2012, 2019, 2020, 2023
Bremer SV	10	1980, 1985, 1986, 1991, 2014, 2015, 2016, 2021, 2022, 2024
Blumenthaler SV	8	1953, 1960, 1963, 1965, 1970, 1974, 1977, 1978
SV Hemelingen	4	1951, 1952, 2025, 2026
FC Bremerhaven	3	1996, 2005, 2006
SGO Bremen	3	1958, 1966, 1975
TuS Eintracht Bremen	3	1956, 1964, 1967
OSC Bremerhaven^{1}	2	1981, 1984
TuS Bremerhaven 93 II^{1}	2	1959, 1968
BSC Hastedt	1	2018
Leher TS	1	2017
SG Aumund-Vegesack	1	2013
TSV Osterholz-Tenever	1	1988
Polizei SV Bremen	1	1973
Hastedter TSV	1	1972
SV Grohn	1	1957
ATSV 1860 Bremen	1	1955
TSV Wulsdorf	1	1954

- No competition held in 1961, 1962 and 1979.
- ^{1} TuS Bremerhaven merged with a number of other local clubs in 1972 to form OSC Bremerhaven.
