= Blumenthaler SV =

German football club

- Full name: Blumenthaler Sportverein von 1919 e.V.
- Founded: 6 June 1919
- Ground: Burgwall-Stadion
- Capacity: 10,000
- Chairman: Peter Moussalli
- Manager: Malte Tietze
- League: Bremen-Liga (V)
- 2025–26: Bremen-Liga, 1st of 16
- Website: https://blumenthalersv.de
| Home colours | Away colours | Third colours |

Blumenthaler SV is a German association football club from Blumenthal, the northernmost district of the city of Bremen. The club was established 6 June 1919 as Blumenthaler Sportverein by former members of Blumenthaler Fußballverein 1912. FV was the successor to Spiel- und Sport Blumenthal and is part of the historical tradition of SG Aumund-Vegesack, which is still active today. As a worker's club, SV was part of the Arbeiter-Turn- und Sportbund (ATSB) in the 1920s and early 1930s. The first men's soccer team plays in the "Bremen Liga" (V).

== History ==
=== Formation to WWII ===
The ATSB was one of several leagues separate from mainstream competition active in Germany in the interwar period, each of which staged its own national championship. In 1932, the club captured the regional Nordwestdeutschland crown and then advanced as far as the semifinals where they were put out by eventual champions TuS Nürnberg-Ost (4–1). The following year, BSV was banned as politically unpalatable by the Nazi regime, alongside other left-leaning workers' and faith-based clubs.

The club was soon reformed as Allgemeiner Sport-Verein Blumenthal von 1919 and, in 1937, qualified to play in the Gauliga Niedersachsen, one of 13 regional first division circuits established in the 1933 reorganization of German football. They remained part of Gauliga competition throughout the course of World War II, but earned only mid-to-lower table results until finishing as vice-champions in the war weakened Gauliga Weser-Ems in 1944. The following season was cut short after just four games by the collapse of Nazi Germany. ASV made two appearances in play for the Tschammer-Pokal, predecessor to the modern day DFB-Pokal (German Cup), going out against Polizei Hamburg in 1939, and against Dresdner SC in the second round in 1940, having beaten Hamburger SV in the first round.

=== Postwar to the 1980s ===
Following the war, the team took on its current name and became part of the Amateurliga Bremen (II) where they captured three consecutive divisional titles from 1950 to 1952. However, BSV failed to advance in each of its subsequent attempts to qualify for the Oberliga Nord (I). The team continued to field strong sides through the 1950s and on into the late 1970s. In 1963, the Amateurliga became a third tier circuit with the formation of the new national first division Bundesliga and the two Regionalliga (II). Despite another four divisional titles and participation in qualification play for the Regionalliga Nord (II) the team was unable to advance. In 1977, BSV crashed out following a 16th-place finish. They made single season cameo appearances in the Amateuroberliga Nord (III) in 1979–80 and the Oberliga Niedersachsen (III) in 1997–98.

The team returned to national cup play in the 1970s with first round appearances in 1974–75, 1975–76, 1977–78, 1978–79 and 1980–81. They also took part in the opening rounds of the national amateur championship in 1955, 1965, 1974, and 1976, without any success.

=== Since 2005 ===
In 2006 the first team won the 18th LOTTO Masters for the Haake Beck Cup (today: LOTTO Masters for the Sparkasse Bremen Cup) in today's Bremen ÖVB Arena against Werder Bremen's U23. In 2015, today's LOTTO Masters was won again. This time the rival Bremer SV was beaten in the final. In 2014, 2016, 2018 and 2020 the entry into the DFB Cup was missed after the Blumenthalers lost the finals for the "Lotto Pokal". In the first two finals, Bremer SV won 1–0 and 3–0 respectively, while in 2018 BSC Hastedt got the upper hand 3–0. In 2020, the Blumenthaler SV failed after a 2–2 draw in regular time on penalties with 5–5 at the Bremen champions and regional league promoted FC Oberneuland.

== Honours ==
The club's honours:

- Bremen-Liga (Tiers II-V)
  - Winners (12): 1950, 1951, 1952, 1959, 1964, 1972, 1973, 1974, 1979, 1989, 1997, 2026
- Landesliga Bremen (VI)
  - Winners (1): 2005
- Bremen Cup (Tiers III-VI)
  - Winners (8): 1953, 1960, 1963, 1965, 1970, 1974, 1977, 1978
- Participants in the DFB Cup and Tschammer Pokal:
  - 1939, 1940, 1974–75, 1975–76, 1977–78, 1978–79, 1980–81

== Youth teams ==
The Blumenthaler SV is known beyond the Bremen state borders for its youth work. For example, the Gambian refugee Ousman Manneh and Sören Seidel, two SV Werder Bremen players, have emerged from the “Burgwall”. Other well-known names from the Blumenthal youth department are those of SC Freiburg professional Lucas Höler, and that of long-time youth coach Michael Kniat who initially trained the U23 of the second division SC Paderborn 07 and is now part of the first team's coaching staff. In January 2021, Kebba Badjie also signed his professional contract with Werder Bremen, the Gambier played for the Blumenthaler U19 in the Regionalliga Nord (II).

=== U19 ===
In 2011, the U19 team achieved promotion to the Regionalliga Nord, and in the following season, for the first time, managed to stay in the second-highest German youth division. The U19s played there until the 2017/18 season. In the 2019/20 and 2021/22 seasons, the first U19 team narrowly missed out on promotion back to the Regionalliga.

In the 2022/23 season, the U19s from Burgwall succeeded in achieving promotion to the Regionalliga. Head coach and chairman Peter Moussalli set the ambitious goal of a direct promotion to the Under 19 Bundesliga. Although they narrowly missed out on that direct promotion, the following season the Blumenthal side earned promotion to the newly founded DFB Youth League, which replaced the Junior Bundesligas starting with the 2024/25 season. The team finished first in their group in the Youth League, ensuring a safe stay in the division as well as qualification for the DFB Youth Cup.

=== U17 ===
In 2010, the U17 team was promoted to the Regionalliga Nord. After just one season, the B Juniors were relegated from the Regionalliga Nord, before achieving promotion again in 2014 and then being relegated again in 2015. In the 2020/21 season, the first U17 team played in the Bremen State League (Bremer Verbandsliga) and, after six matches, was declared champion by the Bremen Football Association based on the points-per-game rule. After the Northern German Football Association denied the team promotion, Blumenthaler SV considered taking legal action.

The Blumenthal U17s are, alongside SC Borgfeld and SV Werder Bremen, one of only three state cup winners within the Bremen Football Association. On their way to the final, they knocked out several Regionalliga teams with outstanding performances. They also secured promotion to the Regionalliga with ease — in the first twelve matches alone, the team scored over one hundred goals and conceded only three in the third-highest division.

In the 2022/23 season, the boys from Burgwall achieved promotion to the U17 Bundesliga and finished as runners-up behind VfL Wolfsburg in the second-highest German youth league. In the Regionalliga Nord, they outperformed several U16 teams from Bundesliga and 2. Bundesliga clubs, as well as U17 sides from teams such as Holstein Kiel and VfL Osnabrück. On August 5, 2023, the first Bundesliga match at Burgwall Stadium took place in front of over 600 spectators. Before the game, Bremen Next and buten un binnen gave the players the nickname BurgwallBoys.

=== U15 ===
The C-Juniors also managed to get promoted to the Regionalliga Nord, where the Blumenthal boys played in the 2013–14 season and since summer 2019, after the promotion could be realized again. Until the season was broken off due to the corona pandemic, the team of head coach Peter Moussalli surprised in the top German division, so that after calculating the point quotient as fourth in the table, relegation was safely achieved. In the 2021–22 season, the C Juniors will play their third season in a row in Germany's top division. Since the 2025-26 season the team is back in the highest league.

== Other teams ==
=== Women's teams ===
Blumenthaler SV has two women's teams. The 1st women's team celebrated promotion to the Bremen Association League (IV) for the 2019–20 season.

The captain of the 1st women's team, Melanie Rethmeyer, was awarded as third place in the "LOTTO Masters for the Sparkasse Bremen Cup" in the election for the Bremen amateur soccer player of the year 2019.

=== Senior football ===
In 2012, the over-32 senior team in Neuler won the 7th German Senior Supercup, the unofficial German championship. In 2013 the title defense in Neubrandenburg at the 8th German Altherren-Supercup was only just missed, the final was lost 5–4 on penalties against VfB Lübeck.

On 11 and 12 June 2022, the Blumenthaler SV will host the 16th German Altherren-Supercup Ü32 on the local Burgwall and on other sports fields in the north of Bremen.

== Stadium ==
Blumenthaler SV plays its home games in the Burgwall-Stadion. The stadium has 5.000 seats and three football fields as well as a hall for futsal.

== Personalities ==
Blumenthaler referee Sven Jablonski has been leading Bundesliga soccer games for Blumenthaler SV since the 2017–18 season and is since the Dezember 2021 FIFA-Referee.

Christian Stoll, stadium spokesman for SV Werder Bremen, has been a member of the Blumenthaler SV for many years.
