= 1. FC Burg =

German football club

- Full name: 1. Fußball Club Burg
- Founded: 1957
- League: Bezirksliga Bremen (VII)
- 2015–16: Landesliga Bremen (VI), 14th (relegated)
- Website: https://1fc-burg.de

1. FC Burg is a German association football club from the northern district of Burg-Grambke in the city-state of Bremen.

== History ==
The club was established in 1957 and won its first lower tier local title in 1965. FC remained part of Kreisklasse play through the 1970s, 1980s, and into the 1990s, until finally winning promotion to the Landesliga Bremen (VI) in 1997. In 2004, they won the league championship and advanced to the Verbandsliga Bremen (V) where they earned mid-table results until being relegated in 2007. They finished as runners-up to SC Weyhe in the Landesliga in 2010 in order to return to what is now the Bremen-Liga (V). In 2014 they finished at the bottom and were relegated back to the Landesliga along with OT Bremen.

== Honours ==
The club's honours:

- Landesliga Bremen
  - Champions: 2004
  - Runners-up: 2010
