= Nico Mai =

German footballer

Personal information
- Date of birth: 9 March 2001 (age 25)
- Place of birth: Magdeburg, Germany
- Height: 1.82 m (6 ft 0 in)
- Position: Left-back

Team information
- Current team: VfB Oldenburg
- Number: 3

Youth career
- 2015–2016: 1. FC Magdeburg
- 2016–2020: VfL Wolfsburg

Senior career*
| Years | Team | Apps | (Gls) |
| 2020–2021 | 1. FC Magdeburg | 1 | (0) |
| 2021 | → Germania Halberstadt (loan) | 0 | (0) |
| 2021–2024 | Holstein Kiel II | 71 | (1) |
| 2024– | VfB Oldenburg | 57 | (4) |
- * Club domestic league appearances and goals as of 22 September 2026

Nico Mai (born 9 March 2001) is a German professional footballer who plays as a left-back for VfB Oldenburg.

== Career ==
Mai was born in Magdeburg, and played youth football with 1. FC Magdeburg and VfL Wolfsburg.

He returned to 1. FC Magdeburg on a three-year contract in July 2020. He made his senior debut as a substitute in a 2–0 defeat at home to Viktoria Köln on 3 October 2020. On 31 January 2021, he joined Germania Halberstadt on loan for the second half of the season.

In July 2021, he joined Holstein Kiel II of the Regionalliga Nord on a free transfer.
