= Leon Demaj =

German footballer

Personal information
- Date of birth: 24 May 1997 (age 29)
- Place of birth: Haselünne, Germany
- Height: 1.81 m (5 ft 11 in)
- Position: Forward

Team information
- Current team: VfB Oldenburg
- Number: 10

Youth career
- –2011: VfL Herzlake
- 2011–2015: SV Meppen
- 2015–2016: BV Cloppenburg

Senior career*
| Years | Team | Apps | (Gls) |
| 2016–2017 | BV Cloppenburg | 29 | (2) |
| 2017–2019 | SV Meppen II | 30 | (24) |
| 2017–2019 | SV Meppen | 4 | (0) |
| 2019–2021 | Sportfreunde Lotte | 51 | (12) |
| 2021–2024 | Fortuna Köln | 59 | (20) |
| 2024 | SV Meppen | 3 | (0) |
| 2024–2026 | Sportfreunde Lotte | 56 | (23) |
| 2026– | VfB Oldenburg | 10 | (3) |
- * Club domestic league appearances and goals as of 22 September 2026

Leon Demaj (born 24 May 1997) is a German footballer who plays as a forward for VfB Oldenburg.
