= SpVgg Bad Homburg =

German football club

- Full name: Spielvereinigung 05/99 Bomber Bad Homburg e.V.
- Founded: 20 August 1905 14 May 1999 (reformed)
- Ground: Sandelmühle
- Capacity: 7,000
- Chairman: Joachim Herbert
- Manager: Michael Zimmermann
- League: Kreisoberliga Hochtaunus (VIII)
- 2015–16: 2nd
Home colours	Away colours

The SpVgg Bad Homburg is a German association football club from the town of Bad Homburg vor der Höhe, Hesse.

The club's greatest success came in 1973 when it won the German amateur football championship, but it also reached the final of this competition on another three occasions. SpVgg also took part in the German Cup on two occasions, in 1977–78 and 1992–93. The club folded in 1999 and reformed soon after and now plays as the SpVgg 05/99 Bomber Bad Homburg.

== History ==
Logo of SpVgg 05 Bad Homburg

The club was formed as SC Germania 05 Homburg on 20 August 1905 and the club's early history is one of frequent mergers and name changes. In 1906 it was renamed to FC Germania 05 Homburg and, in 1911, it merged with FC 1908 Kirdorf to form Homburger SpVgg 08. The following year another merger, now with FC Phönix 08 Bad Homburg, saw the club renamed to Homburger FV 05. Yet another set of mergers, with Sportclub 1920 Homburg and Homburger Hockeyclub saw it renamed to Homburger Sport-Verein 05, a name it retained when it merged with Vorwärts Homburg in 1930. In 1937 the club merged with Reichsbahn-TuSV 1930 Bad Homburg, a club associated with the German railway, and became Reichsbahn SV 05 Bad Homburg, soon after to be changed to Reichsbahn SG 05 Bad Homburg. It was under this name that it experienced its greatest pre-1945 success, reaching the promotion round to the tier one Gauliga Hessen in 1941.

The railways club was disbanded after the end of the Second World War and Freie-Sportgemeinschaft Bad Homburg was formed which became the SpVgg 05 Bad Homburg on 1 February 1946. The club became a founding member of the tier three Amateurliga Hessen in 1950 but lasted for only one season before being relegated again. It returned to this level in 1952 for a spell of nine seasons until 1961. It won the league in 1955 which entitled it to participate in the German amateur football championship for the first time. SpVgg went all the way to the final, where it lost to Sportfreunde Siegen 0–5 in front of 15,000 spectators. The club continued to achieve good results in the Amateurliga, coming second in 1958 but was relegated again in 1961.

SpVgg returned to the Amateurliga in 1965 for a five-season spell until 1970 that saw limited success. It made its third return to this league in 1972, now as a much stronger side again, finishing runners-up in its first two seasons back. In 1973 it also played in the German amateur championship again and won the competition courtesy to a 1–0 victory over the reserve team of 1. FC Kaiserslautern. The club qualified for the first round of the 1977–78 DFB-Pokal, the German Cup, but lost 1–2 to FC 08 Homburg. SpVgg remained in the league in 1978 when it was renamed to Amateur-Oberliga Hessen but was relegated in 1979. It continued its yo-yo existence, returning to the league in 1980, relegated again in 1983 and promoted once more in 1987.

SpVgg Bad Homburg's next spell in the league began in 1987 when it played six more seasons in Hesse's highest league. The club finished runners-up in the league on three occasions when a championship would have meant the right to play in the promotion round to the 2. Bundesliga. Instead it qualified for the German amateur championship, a consolation prize, and reached the final twice more, in 1989 and 1992. In 1989 SpVgg lost to Eintracht Trier on penalties, in 1992 to Rot-Weiß Essen after extra time. It qualified for the German Cup for a second time, losing 1–5 to Eintracht Braunschweig in the second round of the 1992–93 edition. The latter two marked the end of the club's successful years, being relegated from the league the following season, in 1993.

SpVgg made one more return to the league, now renamed Oberliga Hessen, in 1998 but lasted for only 16 games before having to withdraw after declaring insolvency. On 26 June 1999 the club was disbanded.

A new club, the SC 99 Bad Homburg was formed on 14 May 1999 with the primary intend of continuing on the youth teams of the insolvent club. A senior side was formed in 2001 with the help of former Bundesliga player Ralf Haub. On 10 May 2007 the club was renamed SpVgg 05/99 Bad Homburg to attract more interest in Bad Homburg by adopting the name of well-known Spielvereinigung. The club continued to play in the mid tiers of amateur football in Hesse. In 2012 it merged with FC Bomber Bad Homburg, a club with a strong youth program but no senior side, to form the current SpVgg 05/99 Bomber Bad Homburg.

== Honours ==
The club's honours:

=== League ===
- German amateur football championship
  - Winners: 1973
  - Runners-up: (3) 1955, 1989, 1992
- Amateurliga Hessen
  - Champions: 1955
  - Runners-up: (3) 1958, 1973, 1974
- Amateur-Oberliga Hessen
  - Runners-up: (3) 1989, 1990, 1992
- Landesliga Hessen-Süd
  - Champions: (3) 1980, 1987, 1998
- Landesliga Hessen-Mitte
  - Champions: 1972

=== Cup ===
- DFB-Pokal
  - Participant: 1977–78, 1992–93
- Hesse Cup
  - Winners: 1951

== Recent seasons ==
The season-by-season performance of the club since reforming in 1999:

Season	Division	Tier	Position
1999–2001	inactive		
2001–02	Kreisliga A Hochtaunus	VIII	2nd ↑
2002–03	Bezirksliga Hochtaunus	VII	2nd ↑
2003–04	Bezirksoberliga Frankfurt-West	VI	17th ↓
2004–05	Bezirksliga Hochtaunus	VII	9th
2005–06	Bezirksliga Hochtaunus	VII	6th
2006–07	Bezirksliga Hochtaunus	VII	8th
2007–08	Bezirksliga Hochtaunus	VII	5th
2008–09	Bezirksliga Hochtaunus	VIII	2nd ↑
2009–10	Gruppenliga Frankfurt-West	VII	10th
2010–11	Gruppenliga Frankfurt-West	VII	6th
2011–12	Gruppenliga Frankfurt-West	VII	14th
2012–13	Gruppenliga Frankfurt-West	VII	15th ↓
2013–14	Kreisoberliga Hochtaunus	VIII	2nd
2014–15	Kreisoberliga Hochtaunus	VIII	9th
2015–16	Kreisoberliga Hochtaunus	VIII	2nd
2016–17			

- With the introduction of the Regionalligas in 1994 and the 3. Liga in 2008 as the new third tier, below the 2. Bundesliga, all leagues below dropped one tier. Alongside the introduction of the 3. Liga in 2008, a number of football leagues in Hesse were renamed, with the Oberliga Hessen renamed to Hessenliga, the Landesliga to Verbandsliga, the Bezirksoberliga to Gruppenliga and the Bezirksliga to Kreisoberliga.

=== Key ===
↑ Promoted	↓ Relegated
