= 1999 DFB-Ligapokal =

- Tournament programme cover

Tournament details
- Country: Germany
- Teams: 6

Final positions
- Champions: Bayern Munich
- Runners-up: Werder Bremen

Tournament statistics
- Matches played: 5
- Goals scored: 14 (2.8 per match)
- Top goal scorer(s): Ulf Kirsten; Sören Seidel (2)

The 1999 DFB-Ligapokal was the third edition of the DFB-Ligapokal, and, for the third consecutive year, was won by Bayern Munich. Bayern, the previous year's League champions, beat Werder Bremen in the final, a reverse of the previous year's cup final.

== Participating clubs ==
A total of six teams qualified for the competition. The labels in the parentheses show how each team qualified for the place of its starting round:

- 1st, 2nd, 3rd, 4th, etc.: League position
- CW: Cup winners
- TH: Title holders

Semi-finals
Bayern Munich^{TH} (1st)	Werder Bremen (CW)
Preliminary round
Bayer Leverkusen (2nd)	Borussia Dortmund (4th)
Hertha BSC (3rd)	1. FC Kaiserslautern (5th)

== Matches ==
=== Preliminary round ===
10 July 1999
17:45

Bayer Leverkusen	3–1	1. FC Kaiserslautern
Brdarić 30'; Schneider 37'; Kirsten 78'	Report	Pettersson 16'

Ernst-Abbe-Sportfeld, Jena
Attendance: 8,000
Referee: Helmut Fleischer

11 July 1999
17:45

Hertha BSC	1–2	Borussia Dortmund
Sverrisson 62'	Report	Bobic 53'; Herzog 90' (o.g.)

Stadion an der Bremer Brücke, Osnabrück
Attendance: 11,000
Referee: Uwe Kemmling

=== Semi-finals ===
13 July 1999
17:45

Werder Bremen	2–1	Bayer Leverkusen
Seidel 28'; Bode 77'	Report	Kirsten 6'

Erzgebirgsstadion, Aue
Attendance: 7,000
Referee: Torsten Koop

14 July 1999
19:45

Bayern Munich	1–0	Borussia Dortmund
Wörns 66' (o.g.)	Report

Rosenaustadion, Augsburg
Attendance: 24,500
Referee: Alfons Berg

=== Final ===
17 July 1999
17:45 CEST

Werder Bremen	1–2	Bayern Munich
Seidel 56'	Report	Paulo Sérgio 37'; Tarnat 43'

BayArena, Leverkusen
Attendance: 13,000
Referee: Hans-Jürgen Weber (Essen)

== See also ==
- 1999–2000 Bundesliga
- 1999–2000 DFB-Pokal
