= BSC Hastedt =

German football club

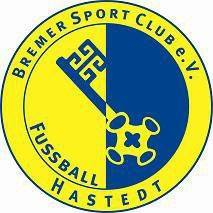
- Full name: Bremer Sportclub Hastedt e.V.
- Nickname: BSC Hastedt
- Founded: 1 June 2008
- Ground: Arena am Jacobsberg
- Capacity: 500
- Manager: Gökhan Deli
- League: Bremen-Liga (V)
- 2017–18: 3rd
- Website: https://www.bremer-sc.de/fussball/
Home colours	Away colours

Bremer Sportclub Hastedt e.V., commonly known as BSC Hastedt, is a German association football club from Hastedt, a subdistrict in the city of Bremen, Bremen. It is a football club with three men's teams and five junior teams. The club currently only offers football.

== History ==
The club was founded on 1 June 2008 with the combination of the football departments of Hastedter TSV and Post-SV Bremen. Hastedter TSV was the more successful of the two clubs but only ever reached Bremen's highest amateur league.

BSC Hastedt as this new union started playing football in the 8th tier, Kreisliga A Bremen. In their second season, 2009–10, they finished in 1st place and won promotion to the Bezirksliga Bremen. Following promotion, they spent the next six seasons in the Bezirksliga finishing at best 5th on 3 occasions until in the 2015–16 season they won the league and earned promotion to Landesliga Bremen. Hastedt brought a strong team to the Landesliga and was able to fight all the way to the top of the table with an away victory against SC Borgfeld on the last matchday.

In the 2017–18 season, Hastedt's first in Landesliga Bremen, they qualified for the final of the Bremer Landespokal against Blumenthaler SV. They won the final 3-0 and secured a place in the first round of the 2018–19 DFB-Pokal. They were drawn at home to Bundesliga side Borussia Mönchengladbach, They moved the venue to the larger Weserstadion Platz 11, where 4,997 fans saw them lose 1–11.

== Honours ==
The club's honours:

=== League ===
- Landesliga Bremen (VI)
  - Champions: 2017
- Bezirksliga (VII)
  - Champions: 2016
- Kreisliga A Bremen (VIII)
  - Champions: 2010

=== Cup ===
- Bremen Cup
  - Winners: 2018

== Recent seasons ==
The recent season-by-season performance of the club:

Season	Division	Tier	Position
2008–09	Kreisliga A (Staffel Bremen-Stadt)	VIII	3rd
2009–10	Kreisliga A (Staffel Bremen-Stadt)	VIII	1st ↑
2010–11	Bezirksliga (Staffel Bremen)	VII	5th
2011–12	Bezirksliga (Staffel Bremen)	VII	11th
2012–13	Bezirksliga (Staffel Bremen)	VII	12th
2013–14	Bezirksliga (Staffel Bremen)	VII	5th
2014–15	Bezirksliga	VII	5th
2015–16	Bezirksliga	VII	1st ↑
2016–17	Landesliga Bremen	VI	1st ↑
2017–18	Bremen-Liga	V	3rd

Key

↑ Promoted	↓ Relegated
