= ATSV 1860 Bremen =

German football club

Logo of predecessor side Bremer Sportfreunde 85/91

ATSV 1860 Bremen was a German association football club playing in Bremen. Today the sports club no longer fields a football side and has departments for badminton, basketball, cheerleading, dancing, fencing, handball, Judo, Karate, pool-billiards, rhythmic gymnastics, rugby union, skating, Taekwon-do, and volleyball.

As of 12 May 2016, the club had 6,407 members.

== History ==
The club was formed as ABTS Bremen in 1920 out of the union of football club Bremer SC 1891, gymnastics club ATV 1860 Bremen, and aquatics club Bremer Schwimm-Club. This combined association fielded competitive sides in the Westkreisliga/Bezirksliga Weser-Jade through the 1920s, capturing a league title in 1922. ABTS went bankrupt in 1929 and re-formed as Sportfreund 85/91 Bremen.

Spfr Bremen briefly played top-flight football from 1942 to the end of World War II in the Gauliga Weser-Ems. The Gauliga Weser-Ems had emerged from the split of the Gauliga Niedersachsen, one of the top-flight divisions formed in the earlier re-organization of German football under the Third Reich in 1933. After World War II, most organizations in Germany, including sports and football clubs, were disbanded by the order of the occupying Allied authorities.

Historical and current logos of ATSV 1860 Bremen

Sportfreunde would later be re-formed as ATSV 1860 Bremen in 1945, and while other Bremen-based teams would go on to play in the first division Oberliga Nord, ATSV re-appeared in the lower division Amateurliga Bremen in 1949. The club immediately impressed with a strong second-place finish and went on to earn a number of top three finishes through the early 1950s, including championships in 1953, 1954, and 1955. Their performance faded and they become just a mid-table side in the years leading up to the formation of Germany's first professional football league – the Bundesliga – in 1963 and in 1968 ATSV was relegated. The team recovered to some degree and returned to Amateurliga play in 1970 until again being relegated in 1974. ATSV made a single-season appearance in the Verbandsliga Bremen in 1986–87.

In March 1998, ATSV's football department merged with BBV Union Bremen, which was founded in 1901 as Elite Bremen and merged in 1909 with Roland Bremen, to become Union 60 Bremen.

== Team trivia ==
- Predecessor side Bremer SC was represented by Hamburg's Walter Sommermeier at the founder's meeting of the German Football Association (Deutscher Fußball Bund) held in Leipzig in 1900.

== Honours ==
as Bremer SC 1891

- Verbandes Bremer Fußball-Vereine champions: 1900

as ATSV 1860 Bremen

- German amateur champions: 1951
- Amateurliga Bremen champions: 1953, 1954, 1955
- Bremer Pokal winners: 1955

Rugby

- DRV Rugby Ligapokal winners 2013
