= Marschweg-Stadion =

Multi-use stadium in Oldenburg, Germany

Coordinates: 53°7′45″N 8°12′23″E

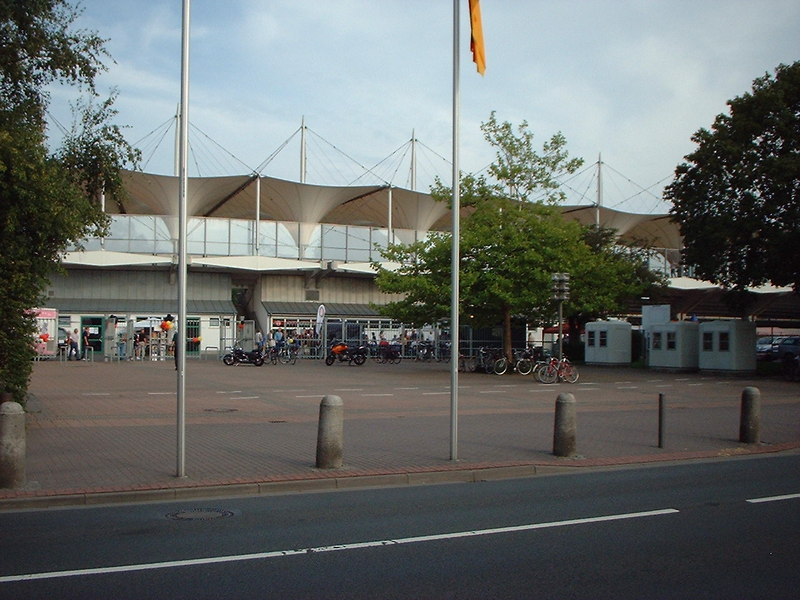
- Interactive map of Marschweg-Stadion
- Full name: Marschweg-Stadion
- Location: Oldenburg, Germany
- Owner: VfB Oldenburg
- Operator: VfB Oldenburg
- Capacity: 15,200

Construction
- Opened: 1951

Tenant
- VfB Oldenburg

Marschweg-Stadion is a multi-use stadium in Oldenburg, Germany. Since 1991 it has been used as the stadium of VfB Oldenburg matches. The capacity of the stadium is 15,200 spectators, of which 4,500 are seats and 10,700 standing places. It achieved a record attendance of 32,000 before reconstruction.
