= SV Werder Bremen II =

German football club

- Ground: Weserstadion Platz 11
- Capacity: 5,500
- Chairman: Klaus-Dieter Fischer
- Manager: Christian Brand
- League: Regionalliga Nord (IV)
- 2025–26: Regionalliga Nord, 12th of 18
Home colours	Away colours	Third colours

SV Werder Bremen II is the reserve team of SV Werder Bremen. It plays in Regionalliga Nord, the fourth level of the German football league system, and has qualified for the first round of the DFB-Pokal on nineteen occasions. It also has won the German amateur football championship three times, a joint record. Until 2005 the team played as SV Werder Bremen Amateure.

It plays its home matches at Weserstadion Platz 11, adjacent to the first team's ground.

== History ==
SV Werder Bremen Amateure first entered the highest league in the state of Bremen, then the tier two Amateurliga Bremen, in 1956, winning a league title in its first season there. The team played as a top side in this league, winning another title in 1962. With the introduction of the Bundesliga in 1963 and the Regionalliga below the Amateurliga Bremen slipped to third tier and Werder Amateure continued to play as a strong side at this level. A runners-up finish in 1966 qualified the team for the German amateur football championship where it defeated Hannover 96 Amateure to win the first of three titles in this competition. It won two more league titles in the Amateurliga in 1967 and 1968 but was knocked out early in the German amateur championship. The team continued as a top side in the league but came only eighth in 1973–74 when a top two finish was required to qualify for the Oberliga Nord, the new third tier in Northern Germany. From 1974 onwards, until 2008, it was also possible for the team to qualify for the German Cup through Bremen Cup wins and it did so on nineteen occasions from 1976 to 2008.

Werder Amateure won what was now the tier four Verbandsliga Bremen and earned promotion to the Oberliga in 1976, beginning an era of third division play that would last until 2012. The team played four average Oberliga Nord seasons before becoming one of the most successful teams in the league, winning championships in 1982 and 1984, and finishing runners-up in 1981, 1983 and 1992 but, as a reserve side, not being permitted to take part in the promotion round to the 2. Bundesliga. Through this success the team became a regular in the German amateur championship, winning titles in 1985 and 1991 and making losing appearances in the 1982 and 1993 finals. In 1994 when the Regionalliga Nord was established in the region as the new third tier Werder Amateure was one of the team's qualified.

The team was not quite as successful in the new Regionalliga in the era from 1994 to 2008 as it had been in the Oberliga, a third place in 1997 being its best-ever result. It did however achieve its two best DFB-Pokal runs in this time, reaching the third round in 1999–2000 and 2007–08, on both occasions going out to VfB Stuttgart. In 2008 the team was one of three reserve sides to qualify for the new 3. Liga, the new third tier of German league football. Werder Bremen II played four seasons at this level, never finishing higher than thirteenth and was relegated from the league in 2012, after 37 seasons at the third tier of German football. The team entered the Regionalliga Nord again, now at the fourth tier and finished runners-up in the league in 2013–14, followed by a league championship the season after. The latter allowed the club to participate in the promotion round to the 3. Liga where it defeated Borussia Mönchengladbach II 2–0 away after a nil-all draw at home and earned promotion back to the third tier.

== Honours ==
The team's honours:

- German amateur championship:
  - Champions: 1966, 1985, 1991
  - Runners-up: 1982, 1993
- Regionalliga Nord:
  - Champions: 2015
- Oberliga Nord:
  - Champions: 1982, 1984
- Bremen-Liga:
  - Champions: 1957, 1962, 1967, 1968, 1976, 2024
- Bremer Pokal:
  - Winners: 1969, 1971, 1976, 1982, 1983, 1987, 1989, 1990, 1992–95, 1997–2002, 2004, 2007

== Players ==
=== Current squad ===
As of 8 September 2026

Note: Flags indicate national team as defined under FIFA eligibility rules; some limited exceptions apply. Players may hold more than one non-FIFA nationality.

No.	Pos.	Nation	Player
1	GK	BUL	Stefan Smarkalev
2	DF	GER	Johann Wegner
3	DF	GER	Mats Heitmann
4	DF	GER	Egor Greber
5	DF	GER	Cimo Röcker
6	MF	GER	Yasin Chebil
7	MF	GER	Jasha Barry
9	FW	GER	Christian Stark
11	FW	GER	Karlo Šimić
13	FW	GER	Jakob Wiehe
14	MF	GER	Lennart Baum
15	MF	GER	Mario Mbassi
16	FW	GER	Paul Erevbenagie

No.	Pos.	Nation	Player
17	MF	GER	Patrick Götzelmann
18	FW	NGR	Princewill Mbock
19	MF	GER	Boran-Firat Coskun
20	GK	GER	Jonas Horsch
21	GK	GER	Sebastian Mielitz
22	DF	GER	Paul Bellmann
23	FW	GER	Arian Römers
25	DF	USA	Ramiz Hamouda
25	MF	GER	Noah Weißbach
26	DF	GER	Luca Höcker
27	DF	GER	Jannes Ossadnik
33	DF	GER	Tyrese Igwesi

== Recent seasons ==
The recent season-by-season performance of the club:

Year	Division	Tier	Position
1999–2000	Regionalliga Nord	III	5th
2000–01	Regionalliga Nord	III	15th
2001–02	Regionalliga Nord	III	10th
2002–03	Regionalliga Nord	III	6th
2003–04	Regionalliga Nord	III	5th
2004–05	Regionalliga Nord	III	14th
2005–06	Regionalliga Nord	III	12th
2006–07	Regionalliga Nord	III	8th
2007–08	Regionalliga Nord	III	5th
2008–09	3. Liga	III	17th
2009–10	3. Liga	III	13th
2010–11	3. Liga	III	18th
2011–12	3. Liga	III	20th ↓
2012–13	Regionalliga Nord	IV	5th
2013–14	Regionalliga Nord	IV	2nd
2014–15	Regionalliga Nord	IV	1st ↑
2015–16	3. Liga	III	17th
2016–17	3. Liga	III	17th
2017–18	3. Liga	III	18th ↓
2018–19	Regionalliga Nord	IV	3rd
2019–20	Regionalliga Nord	IV	6th
2020–21	Regionalliga Nord ("Süd")	IV	1st
2021–22	Regionalliga Nord ("Süd")	IV	2nd
2022–23	Regionalliga Nord	IV	15th ↓
2023–24	Bremen-Liga	V	1st ↑
2024–25	Regionalliga Nord	IV	4th
2025–26	Regionalliga Nord	IV	12th

- With the introduction of the Regionalligas in 1994 and the 3. Liga in 2008 as the new third tier, below the 2. Bundesliga, all leagues below dropped one tier.

Key

↑ Promoted	↓ Relegated
