= Promotion to the 2. Bundesliga =

- Organiser(s): DFL and DFB
- Founded: 1974; 52 years ago
- Region: Germany
- Teams: 2 or 3
- Qualifier for: 2. Bundesliga
- Current champions: VfL Osnabrück; Energie Cottbus (2025–26)
- 2026–27 3. Liga

The Promotion to the 2. Bundesliga (German: Aufstiegsrunde zur 2. Bundesliga) are an end-of-season competition, held annually to determine the clubs that were promoted from the Amateurligas, later the Amateur Oberligas to the 2. Bundesligas. It is necessary because there are more third division champions than promotion spots available.

Originally there were fifteen Amateurligas which were reduced to eight Amateur Oberligas in 1978. From 1981 the 2. Bundesliga was reduced to one single league.

After the introduction of the Regionalliga in 1994, the promotion round was greatly reduced in length, generally only involving two teams. Eventually, after 2000, all promotion spots to the 2. Bundesliga were direct with no deciders necessary. Since the 2008–09 season, after the introduction of the 3. Liga, a promotion round was reintroduced.

== Leagues ==
=== Tier two ===
Originally, there were two 2. Bundesligas, the second tier of the German football league system, these being:

- 2. Bundesliga Süd
- 2. Bundesliga Nord

In 1981, these were reduced to just one league, the 2. Bundesliga.

=== Tier three ===
In 1975, there were 15 Amateurligas, the third level of German football, these being:

==== Southern Germany ====
- Amateurliga Bayern
- Amateurliga Hessen
- Amateurliga Nordbaden
- Amateurliga Südbaden
- Amateurliga Schwarzwald-Bodensee
- Amateurliga Württemberg
- Amateurliga Saarland
- Amateurliga Südwest
- Amateurliga Rheinland

In 1978, these were reduced to four Amateur Oberligas, these being:

- Amateur Oberliga Bayern
- Amateur Oberliga Hessen
- Amateur Oberliga Baden-Württemberg
- Amateur Oberliga Südwest

==== Northern Germany ====
- Oberliga Berlin
- Oberliga Nord
- Amateurliga Niederrhein
- Amateurliga Mittelrhein
- Amateurliga Westfalen 1
- Amateurliga Westfalen 2

In 1978, these were reduced to four Amateur Oberligas, these being:

- Amateur-Oberliga Berlin (disbanded in 1991)
- Amateur Oberliga Nord
- Amateur Oberliga Nordrhein
- Amateur Oberliga Westfalen

=== North-Eastern Germany ===
The following three Oberligas were formed in 1991, after the German reunion.

- NOFV-Oberliga Nord
- NOFV-Oberliga Mitte
- NOFV-Oberliga Süd

== System and modus ==
=== 2. Bundesliga South promotion modus ===
From 1975 until 1978 the champions of the Amateurligas Bayern and Hessen were directly promoted to the 2. Bundesliga. The winners of the Amateurligas Nordbaden, Südbaden, Schwarzwald-Bodensee and Württemberg played out a third promotion spot. The winners of the Amateurligas Saarland, Südwest and Rheinland played out a fourth spot. Both these rounds were played in a home-and-away round robin.

In 1979 and 1980 there was no play-offs as the nine southern Amateurligas had merged to four Oberligas and therefore each champion was promoted directly. This fact was actually the main reason for the merger.

=== 2. Bundesliga North promotion modus ===
In 1975 and 1976 the champions of the Amateurligas Niederrhein, Mittelrhein and the second placed team in the Oberliga Nord played out two promotion spots. The champion of the Amateurliga Berlin, the champion of the Oberliga Nord and the winner of the decider of the two Westfalen champions played out another two spots.

In 1977 and 1978 the top four teams of the Oberliga Nord, the champions of the Amateurligas Niederrhein, Mittelrhein, Westfalen 1, Westfalen 2 and Berlin played out the four promotion spots in two groups of four. Beforehand, a decider between the 4th placed team from the North and the runners-up of Westfalen reduced the number to eight out of those nine.

In 1979 and 1980 there was no play-offs as the six northern leagues merged to form four Oberligas like in the south. The champions of the Oberligas Nord, Nordrhein and Westfalen were promoted directly, the winner of Oberliga Berlin had to play the runners-up of the Oberliga Nord for the last spot.

=== 2. Bundesliga promotion modus ===
From 1982 until 1991 the play-offs were split into a north and a south group.

In the southern group the four Oberliga champions of Bayern, Baden-Württemberg, Hessen and Südwest played out two promotion spots. In 1982 this was done in a single round system, afterwards in a home-and-away round robin.

In the northern group the winners of the four Oberligas Berlin, Westfalen, Nordrhein and Nord played out two promotion spots. In 1982 this was done in a single round system, afterwards in a home-and-away round robin. From 1984 the runners-up of the Oberliga Nord was also included in this play-off, taking the number of teams to five.

After the reunification of Germany the number of teams was extended.

In 1991 there was an additional two groups of four teams from East Germany. The winner of each of those four groups were promoted.

In 1992 there was 13 teams in four groups with the group winner gaining promotion. Qualified to this play-off were the ten Oberliga champions, the runners-up from Oberliga Nord and two teams from 2. Bundesliga.

In 1993 and 1994 the ten Oberliga champions and the runners-up from Oberliga Nord played in three groups, two times four and one time three, for three promotion spots.

in 1994 the four Regionalliga were introduced as an intermediate between 2. Bundesliga and the Oberligas. Oberliga teams were now promoted to the Regionalligas instead.

=== Modus from 1994 ===
With the introduction of the four Regionalligas in 1994, the system for promotion was somewhat simpler. The champions of the Regionalligas Süd and West/Südwest were always directly promoted. The Regionalligas Nord and Nordost were considered a single entity for the purpose of promotion, therefore only one of the two winners could get directly promoted. From 1996, the two winners of the league had to play a home-and-away decider. The reason for this was that each of the first two Regionalligas covered areas with a population and playing strength roughly equal to the combined second two. The fourth promotion spot was allocated the following way:

- 1995: To the Nord/Nordost region, therefore both league winners promoted.
- 1996: To the West/Südwest region, runners-up of that region promoted.
- 1997: To the Süd region, runners-up of that region promoted.
- 1998 to 2000: The runners-up of West/Südwest and Süd plus the losing team from the Nord/Nordost area play a group round-robin to determine the fourth promoted team.

With the reduction of the numbers of Regionalligas in 2000 to two, play-offs became unnecessary and two teams from each league were directly promoted.

=== Modus from 2000 ===
After the changes in the league system in 2000, the reduction of the numbers of Regionalligas from four to two, direct promotion was available to the 2. Bundesliga once more. The champions and runners-up of the two Regionalligas moved up without having to play a promotion round. In some instances, a promotion spot was held by a reserve team of a Bundesliga or 2. Bundesliga side, in those cases, the next-best placed first team was promoted instead.

In 2008, the 3. Liga was established as the new third tier, between Regionalligas and 2. Bundesliga. The top-two teams out of the third division are directly promoted. The third placed club has to play the 16th placed team of the 2. Bundesliga in a home and away round to determine who receives the last spot in the second division. Reserve sides, which also play in the 3. Liga, can not earn promotion.

== Clubs taking part in the promotion round ==
=== Southern Germany (1975–1978) ===
- Directly promoted clubs from Hesse and Bavaria

Season	Amateurliga Bayern	Amateurliga Hessen
1974–75	Jahn Regensburg	FSV Frankfurt
1975–76	Würzburger FV	KSV Baunatal
1976–77	Würzburger Kickers	VfR Bürstadt
1977–78	MTV Ingolstadt	FC Hanau 93

- Promotion round: Southwestern group

Season	Amateurliga Saarland	Amateurliga Südwest	Amateurliga Rheinland
1974–75	ASC Dudweiler	Eintracht Bad Kreuznach	Eintracht Trier
1975–76	Borussia Neunkirchen	Wormatia Worms	Eintracht Trier
1976–77	Borussia Neunkirchen	Wormatia Worms	TuS Neuendorf
1977–78	Borussia Neunkirchen	Mainz 05	TuS Neuendorf

- Promotion round: Baden-Württemberg group

Season	Amateurliga Nordbaden	Amateurliga Südbaden	Amateurliga Württemberg	Amateurliga Schwarzwald-Bodensee
1974–75	VfB Eppingen	Offenburger FV	VfR Aalen	SSV Reutlingen
1975–76	VfR Mannheim	FC 08 Villingen	SpVgg Ludwigsburg	BSV Schwenningen
1976–77	SV Neckargerach	Freiburger FC	SSV Ulm	SSV Reutlingen
1977–78	FV Weinheim	SC Freiburg	SSV Ulm	SSV Reutlingen

=== Southern Germany (1982–1994) ===
Season	Oberliga Bayern	Oberliga Hessen	Oberliga Baden-Württemberg	Oberliga Südwest
1981–82	FC Augsburg	FSV Frankfurt	SSV Ulm	FC Homburg
1982–83	SpVgg Unterhaching	VfR Oli Bürstadt	SSV Ulm	1. FC Saarbrücken
1983–84	1860 Munich	VfR Oli Bürstadt	Freiburger FC	FC Homburg
1984–85	SpVgg Bayreuth	Viktoria Aschaffenburg	SV Sandhausen	FSV Salmrohr
1985–86	1860 Munich	Kickers Offenbach	SSV Ulm	FSV Salmrohr
1986–87	SpVgg Bayreuth	Kickers Offenbach	SV Sandhausen	Eintracht Trier
1987–88	SpVgg Unterhaching	Viktoria Aschaffenburg	FV 09 Weinheim	Mainz 05
1988–89	SpVgg Unterhaching	Hessen Kassel	SSV Reutlingen	SV Edenkoben
1989–90	Schweinfurt 05	Rot-Weiss Frankfurt	SSV Reutlingen	Mainz 05
1990–91	1860 Munich	Hessen Kassel	1. FC Pforzheim	Borussia Neunkirchen
1991–92	SpVgg Unterhaching	Viktoria Aschaffenburg	SSV Reutlingen	FSV Salmrohr
1992–93	1860 Munich	Kickers Offenbach	SSV Ulm	Eintracht Trier
1993–94	FC Augsburg	FSV Frankfurt	SSV Ulm	Eintracht Trier

=== Northern Germany (1975–1978) ===
- Promotion round: Group A

Season	Amateurliga Mittelrhein	Amateurliga Niederrhein	Oberliga Nord
1974–75	Bayer Leverkusen	Union Solingen	Arminia Hannover
1975–76	Bonner SC	1. FC Bocholt	VfL Wolfsburg

Season	Amateurliga Westfalen	Amateurliga Mittelrhein	Oberliga Nord	Oberliga Nord
1976–77	Rot-Weiß Lüdenscheid	Siegburger SV 04	Union Salzgitter	Holstein Kiel
1977–78	DSC Wanne-Eickel	Viktoria Köln	VfL Wolfsburg	Göttingen 05

- Promotion round: Group B

Season	Amateurligas Westfalen	Oberliga Berlin	Oberliga Nord
1974–75	Westfalia Herne	Spandauer SV	VfB Oldenburg
1975–76	SC Herford	Union 06 Berlin	Arminia Hannover

Season	Amateurliga Niederrhein	Oberliga Berlin	Oberliga Nord	Qualifier
1976–77	1. FC Bocholt	Spandauer SV	TuS Bremerhaven	SVA Gütersloh
1977–78	Olympia Bocholt	Wacker Berlin	OSV Hannover	Holstein Kiel

=== Northern Germany (1982–1994) ===
Season	Oberliga Nordrhein	Oberliga Westfalen	Oberliga Berlin	Oberliga Nord (1st)	Oberliga Nord (2nd)
1981–82	BV Lüttringhausen	TuS Schloß Neuhaus	Tennis Borussia Berlin	Arminia Hannover	—
1982–83	Rot-Weiß Oberhausen	Eintracht Hamm	SC Charlottenburg	FC St. Pauli	—
1983–84	1. FC Bocholt	FC Gütersloh	Blau-Weiß Berlin	FC St. Pauli	SV Lurup
1984–85	Rot-Weiss Essen	Eintracht Hamm	Tennis Borussia Berlin	VfL Osnabrück	Hummelsbütteler SV
1985–86	Rot-Weiß Essen	ASC Schöppingen	SC Charlottenburg	FC St. Pauli	VfB Oldenburg
1986–87	BVL Remscheid	SpVgg Erkenschwick	Hertha BSC	SV Meppen	Arminia Hannover
1987–88	MSV Duisburg	Preußen Münster	Hertha BSC	Eintracht Braunschweig	VfL Wolfsburg
1988–89	MSV Duisburg	Preußen Münster	Reinickendorfer Füchse	TSV Havelse	Göttingen 05
1989–90	Wuppertaler SV	Arminia Bielefeld	Reinickendorfer Füchse	VfB Oldenburg	TSV Havelse
1990–91	FC Remscheid	SC Verl	Tennis Borussia Berlin	VfL Wolfsburg	Göttingen 05
1991–92	Wuppertaler SV	Preußen Münster	—	VfL Wolfsburg	TSV Havelse
1992–93	Rot-Weiß Essen	Preußen Münster	—	VfL Herzlake	SC Norderstedt
1993–94	Fortuna Düsseldorf	TuS Paderborn-Neuhaus	—	Kickers Emden	Eintracht Braunschweig

=== North-Eastern Germany (1991–1994) ===
Season	NOFV-Oberliga Nord	NOFV-Oberliga Mitte	NOFV Oberliga Süd
1991–92	FC Berlin	Union Berlin	FSV Zwickau
1992–93	Tennis Borussia Berlin	Union Berlin	Bischofswerdaer FV
1993–94	BSV Brandenburg	Energie Cottbus	FSV Zwickau

== Promoted teams from the Regionalliga (1995–2008) ==
=== 1995–2000 ===
**Season**	**Regionalliga Süd**	**Regionalliga West/Südwest**	**Regionalliga Nord**	**Regionalliga Nord-Ost**
1994–95	**SpVgg Unterhaching**	**Arminia Bielefeld**	**VfB Lübeck**	**Carl Zeiss Jena**
1995–96	**Stuttgarter Kickers**	**FC Gütersloh** **Rot-Weiss Essen**	**VfB Oldenburg**	Tennis Borussia Berlin
1996–97	**1. FC Nürnberg** **Greuther Fürth**	**SG Wattenscheid**	Hannover 96	**Energie Cottbus**
1997–98	**SSV Ulm**	**Rot-Weiß Oberhausen**	**Hannover 96**	**Tennis Borussia Berlin**
1998–99	**Waldhof Mannheim** **Kickers Offenbach**	**Alemannia Aachen**	VfL Osnabrück	**Chemnitzer FC**
1999–2000	**SSV Reutlingen**	**1. FC Saarbrücken** **LR Ahlen**	**VfL Osnabrück**	Union Berlin

=== The Nord versus Nordost play-off games ===
These were staged in the five seasons from 1996 to 2000 to determine which team was directly promoted. From 1998, the loser of this games got a second chance for promotion by playing the runners-up of the other two Regionalligas.

**Date**	**Team A**	Team B	**Game 1**	**Game 2**
1995–96	Tennis Borussia Berlin	VfB Oldenburg	1–1	1–2 (a.e.t.)
1996–97	Hannover 96	Energie Cottbus	0–0	1–3
1997–98	Tennis Borussia Berlin	Hannover 96	2–0	0–2 (1–3 p)
1998–99	VfL Osnabrück	Chemnitzer FC	1–0	0–2
1999–2000	Union Berlin	VfL Osnabrück	1–1	1–1 (7–8 p)

- Winner in **bold**.

=== 2000–2008 ===
All listed teams were promoted:

**Season**	**Regionalliga Süd**		**Regionalliga Nord**	
2000–01	Karlsruher SC	FC Schweinfurt 05	1. FC Union Berlin	SV Babelsberg 03
2001–02	Wacker Burghausen	Eintracht Trier	VfB Lübeck	Eintracht Braunschweig
2002–03	SpVgg Unterhaching	SSV Jahn Regensburg	Erzgebirge Aue	VfL Osnabrück
2003–04	Rot-Weiß Erfurt	1. FC Saarbrücken	Rot-Weiß Essen	Dynamo Dresden
2004–05	Kickers Offenbach	Sportfreunde Siegen	Eintracht Braunschweig	SC Paderborn 07
2005–06	FC Augsburg	TuS Koblenz	Rot-Weiß Essen	FC Carl Zeiss Jena
2006–07	SV Wehen	TSG 1899 Hoffenheim	FC St Pauli	VfL Osnabrück
2007–08	FSV Frankfurt	FC Ingolstadt 04	Rot-Weiß Ahlen	Rot-Weiß Oberhausen

== 3. Liga ==
With the introduction of the 3. Liga in 2008, the first two teams of this league earned promotion to the 2. Bundesliga while the third placed team had to go through a promotion round.

**Season**	**Champions**	**Runners-up**	**Promotion Playoff**	**Standings**
2008–09	**Union Berlin**	**Fortuna Düsseldorf**	**SC Paderborn**	Table
2009–10	**VfL Osnabrück**	**Erzgebirge Aue**	**FC Ingolstadt**	Table
2010–11	**Eintracht Braunschweig**	**Hansa Rostock**	**Dynamo Dresden**	Table
2011–12	**SV Sandhausen**	**VfR Aalen**	**Jahn Regensburg**	Table
2012–13	**Karlsruher SC**	**Arminia Bielefeld**	VfL Osnabrück	Table
2013–14	**1. FC Heidenheim**	**RB Leipzig**	**Darmstadt 98**	Table
2014–15	**Arminia Bielefeld**	**MSV Duisburg**	Holstein Kiel	Table
2015–16	**Dynamo Dresden**	**Erzgebirge Aue**	**Würzburger Kickers**	Table
2016–17	**MSV Duisburg**	**Holstein Kiel**	**Jahn Regensburg**	Table
2017–18	**1. FC Magdeburg**	**SC Paderborn**	Karlsruher SC	Table
2018–19	**VfL Osnabrück**	**Karlsruher SC**	**Wehen Wiesbaden**	Table
2019–20	**Würzburger Kickers** (Note: The champions of the 2019–20 3. Liga, Bayern Munich II, could not be promoted as they are a reserve team, so the promotion spot was instead passed down to the next eligible team.)	**Eintracht Braunschweig**	FC Ingolstadt	Table
2020–21	**Dynamo Dresden**	**Hansa Rostock**	**FC Ingolstadt**	Table
2021–22	**1. FC Magdeburg**	**Eintracht Braunschweig**	**1. FC Kaiserslautern**	Table
2022–23	**SV Elversberg**	**VfL Osnabrück** (Note: The runners-up of the 2022–23 3. Liga, SC Freiburg II, could not be promoted as they are a reserve team, so the promotion spot was instead passed down to the next eligible team.)	**Wehen Wiesbaden**	Table
2023–24	**SSV Ulm**	**Preußen Münster**	**Jahn Regensburg**	Table
2024–25	**Arminia Bielefeld**	**Dynamo Dresden**	1. FC Saarbrücken	Table
2025–26	**VfL Osnabrück**	**Energie Cottbus**	Rot-Weiss Essen	Table

- **Bold** denotes team earned promotion.

=== 3. Liga promotion round ===
From the 2008–09 season onwards, the third placed team in the 3. Liga had to play the 16th placed team in the 2. Bundesliga for one more spot in the second division:

2008–09

Team 1	Agg.	Team 2	1st leg	2nd leg
**SC Paderborn** (3L)	2–0	VfL Osnabrück (2B)	1–0	1–0

2009–10

Team 1	Agg.	Team 2	1st leg	2nd leg
**FC Ingolstadt** (3L)	3–0	Hansa Rostock (2B)	1–0	2–0

2010–11

Team 1	Agg.	Team 2	1st leg	2nd leg
**Dynamo Dresden** (3L)	4–2	VfL Osnabrück (2B)	1–1	3–1 (a.e.t.)

2011–12

Team 1	Agg.	Team 2	1st leg	2nd leg
**Jahn Regensburg** (3L)	3–3 (a)	Karlsruher SC (2B)	1–1	2–2

2012–13

Team 1	Agg.	Team 2	1st leg	2nd leg
VfL Osnabrück (3L)	1–2	**Dynamo Dresden** (2B)	1–0	0–2

2013–14

Team 1	Agg.	Team 2	1st leg	2nd leg
**Darmstadt 98** (3L)	5–5 (a)	Arminia Bielefeld (2B)	1–3	4–2 (a.e.t.)

2014–15

Team 1	Agg.	Team 2	1st leg	2nd leg
Holstein Kiel (3L)	1–2	**1860 Munich** (2B)	0–0	1–2

2015–16

Team 1	Agg.	Team 2	1st leg	2nd leg
**Würzburger Kickers** (3L)	4–1	MSV Duisburg (2B)	2–0	2–1

2016–17

Team 1	Agg.	Team 2	1st leg	2nd leg
**Jahn Regensburg** (3L)	3–1	1860 Munich (2B)	1–1	2–0

2017–18

Team 1	Agg.	Team 2	1st leg	2nd leg
Karlsruher SC (3L)	1–3	**Erzgebirge Aue** (2B)	0–0	1–3

2018–19

Team 1	Agg.	Team 2	1st leg	2nd leg
**Wehen Wiesbaden** (3L)	4–4 (a)	FC Ingolstadt (2B)	1–2	3–2

2019–20

Team 1	Agg.	Team 2	1st leg	2nd leg
1. FC Nürnberg (2B)	3–3 (a)	FC Ingolstadt (3L)	2–0	1–3

2020–21

Team 1	Agg.	Team 2	1st leg	2nd leg
FC Ingolstadt	4–3	VfL Osnabrück	3–0	1–3

2021–22

Team 1	Agg.	Team 2	1st leg	2nd leg
Dynamo Dresden	0–2	**1. FC Kaiserslautern**	0–0	0–2

2022–23

Team 1	Agg.	Team 2	1st leg	2nd leg
**Wehen Wiesbaden**	6–1	Arminia Bielefeld	4–0	2–1

2023–24

Team 1	Agg.	Team 2	1st leg	2nd leg
**Jahn Regensburg** (3L)	4–3	Wehen Wiesbaden (2B)	2–2	2–1

2024–25

Team 1	Agg.	Team 2	1st leg	2nd leg
1. FC Saarbrücken (3L)	2–4	**Eintracht Braunschweig** (2B)	0–2	2–2

2025–26

Team 1	Agg.	Team 2	1st leg	2nd leg
Rot-Weiss Essen (3L)	1–2	Greuther Fürth (2B)	1–0	0–2

- Winner in **bold**.

Symbol	Key
(2B)	2. Bundesliga – 16th placed team
(3L)	3. Liga – 3rd placed team

== See also ==
- Promotion to the Bundesliga
- Promotion to the 3. Liga
