= SV Türkspor Bremen-Nord =

German football club

- Full name: Sportverein Türkspor Bremen-Nord e.V.
- Ground: Burgwall-Stadion
- Manager: Erhan Koser
- League: Landesliga Bremen (VI)
- 2015–16: 13th
Home colours	Away colours

SV Türkspor Bremen-Nord is a German association football club from the district of Blumenthal in the city of Bremen. It was founded by Turkish immigrants.

== History ==
The club was established in 1977. The club won its way into the Landesliga Bremen (V) in 2004, and after finishing as runners-up in 2008, advanced to the Bremen-Liga (VI). The team's best result there to date was a 6th-place finish in 2010. After finishing last in the league in 2014–15, the club was relegated from the Bremen-Liga.

== Honours ==
The club's honours:

- Landesliga Bremen
  - Runners-up: 2008
