= Burgwall-Stadion =

Football stadium in germany

Coordinates: 53.1881°N 8.5835°E

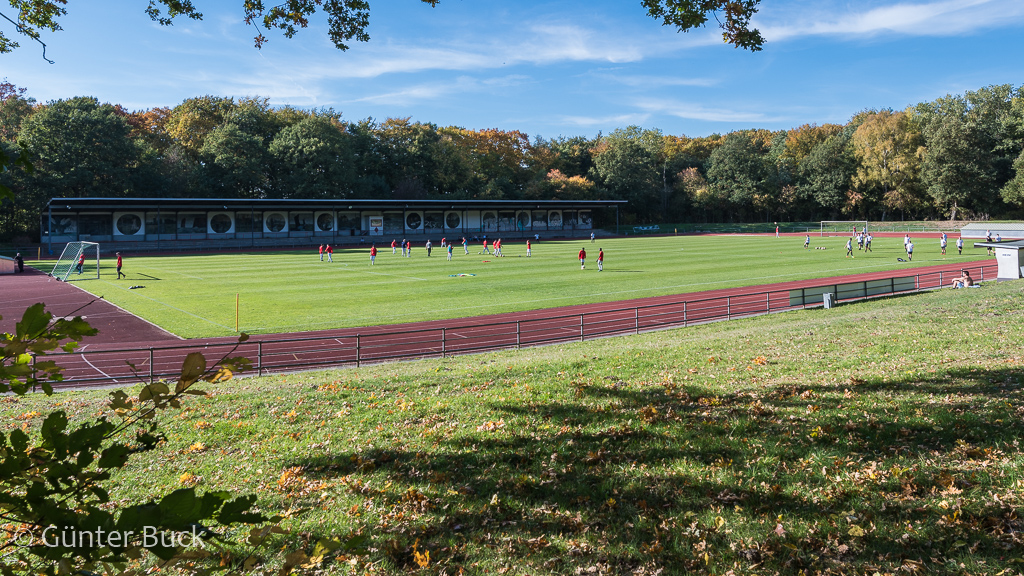

The Burgwall-Stadion is a football stadium in the northernmost part of the German city of Bremen.

The Burgwall Stadium is the competition and training facility of the Blumenthaler SV, the district sports facility at Burgwall, which includes the stadium, three football pitches and a hall. Since the opening game against SV Werder Bremen on 9 September 1951, the Blumenthalers regularly play their home games here.

== History ==
The facility was built in the early 1950s and on 9 September 1951, with a friendly match between Blumenthaler SV and Werder Bremen. Blumenthaler SV played for four years in the then third-class Oberliga Nord and one year in the fourth-class Oberliga Niedersachsen/Bremen. In addition, the club played several times in the DFB Cup at Burgwall and received professional clubs such as MSV Duisburg, the 1. FC Kaiserslautern and Werder Bremen. Blumenthaler SV achieved the highest spectator average in the 1974–75 season, when an average of 2,427 spectators came to the home games.

Between December 2014 and May 2016, a new changing room building was built. The cost was around 2.15 million euros.

== Infrastructure ==
Blumenthaler SV plans to convert the sports facility into a sports park in 2022.

Facilities for sports such as athletics, volleyball, football, fitness, streetball, football tennis or padel tennis are to be built. In addition, a streetball facility, a soccer cage, and a padel tennis facility, as well as a calisthenics facility are to be built. Moreover, energetic self-sufficiency of the entire sports facility should be ensured. Additionally, the entire facility is to be renovated and a clubhouse built. The stadium should also be made suitable for at least the fourth division.

The Burgwall-Stadion is not far from the Bremen-Blumenthal train station, which can be reached via the RS1 S-Bahn line and the BSAG bus lines 90, 91, 92, 94, 95 and 96. It is also located directly on the A270 federal motorway near exit 2 (Bremen-Lüssum) and exit 3 (Bremen-Blumenthal).
