= Rafael Brand =

German footballer (born 1994)

Personal information
- Date of birth: 9 September 1994 (age 32)
- Place of birth: Bremerhaven, Germany
- Height: 1.76 m (5 ft 9 in)
- Position: Winger

Team information
- Current team: VfB Oldenburg
- Number: 8

Youth career
- –2011: OSC Bremerhaven
- 2011–2013: Werder Bremen

Senior career*
Years	Team	Apps	(Gls)
2013–2015	OSC Bremerhaven	30	(38)
2015–2017	Hamburger SV II	44	(4)
2017–2018	BFC Dynamo	18	(3)
2018–2020	Viktoria Berlin	45	(8)
2020–	VfB Oldenburg	155	(42)
- * Club domestic league appearances and goals as of 22 September 2026

Rafael Brand (born 9 September 1994) is a German professional footballer who plays as a forward or winger for Regionalliga side VfB Oldenburg.

== Career ==
Brand was born in Bremerhaven. He joined Regionalliga Nord club VfB Oldenburg in summer 2020. In the 2021–22 season he achieved promotion to the 3. Liga with VfB Oldenburg.

== Personal life ==
Brand has studied at the University of Oldenburg.
