= TSV Wulsdorf =

- Full name: Turn- und Sportverein Wulsdorf e.V.
- Founded: 1900
- League: Landesliga Bremen (VI)
- 2015–16: 9th
- Website: https://www.tsv-wulsdorf.de

TSV Wulsdorf is a German multi-sports club from the district of Wulsdorf in the city of Bremerhaven. It has 12 different sports sections.

== History ==
The origins of the club go back to the formation of Fußball Club Wulsdorf in 1900, which later renamed Sportverein Wulsdorf. On 29 April 1939, SV merged with Verein für Leibesübungen Wolsdorf, which was the successor to Turn- und Sport Wulsdof, a workers' club banned in 1933 as politically undesirable under the Nazi regime alongside other leftist or faith-based sports clubs.

In 1949, the team advanced to play in the second tier Amateurliga Bremen where they earned a third-place result in their debut season. They captured the regional cup in 1954 and the following year, earned another third-place finish. TSV remained part of Amateurliga play, earning generally mid-table results, until being demoted in 1966. They moved up and down between the Amateurliga (III) and the Verbandsliga Bremen (IV) over the next three seasons until settling into Amateurliga competition until the end of the 1970s. The team descended through the Landesliga to lower tier local level play in 1983. Through the 1980s they were an elevator club, moving frequently between Landesliga Bremen and Bezirksliga play. They returned to the now fifth tier Verbandsliga Bremen in 1994 before again sliding to Bezirksliga competition by 2000. Two successive promotions saw TSV rise again to the Verbandsliga by 2007. Wulsdorf remain part of the circuit which was renamed the Bremen-Liga in 2008. In 2013 they withdrew from the Bremen-Liga shortly after the winter break and before the next season opened, entered the Landesliga Bremen (VI) where they play today.

== Women's football ==
Through the 1970s and on into the early 1980s, TSV's women's side was among the best in Bremen football, taking part in the playoff rounds of the national championship between 1975 and 1982. However, they were never able to make it out of the opening round. The team narrowly missed qualification for the new Oberliga Nord (II) in 1986 and have since slipped to fifth-tier play in the Landesliga.

== Honours ==
The club's honours:

- Landesliga Bremen
  - Champions: 2007
- Bremer Pokal
  - Winners: 1954
