= Landesliga Bremen =

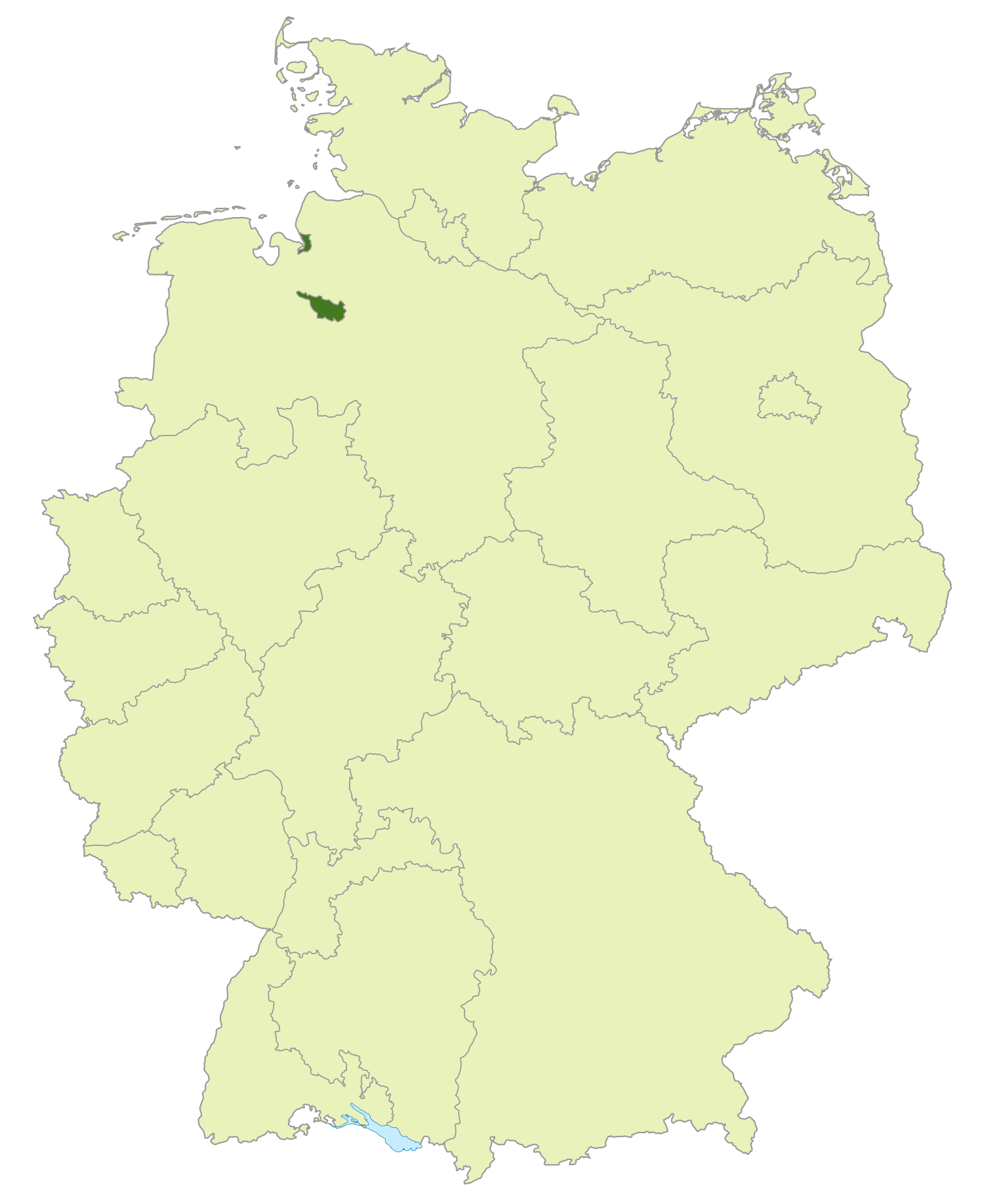
- Country: Germany
- State: Bremen
- Number of clubs: 16
- Level on pyramid: Level 6
- Promotion to: Bremen-Liga
- Relegation to: Bezirksliga Bremen
- Current champions: TS Woltmershausen (2021–22)

The Landesliga Bremen is the sixth tier of the German football league system and the second-highest league in the German state of Bremen, below the Bremen-Liga.

== Overview ==
The Landesliga Bremen is the second-highest level of play in Bremen. Traditionally, the league is set below the Verbandsliga Bremen. With the Oberliga Nord being dissolved in 2008, the Verbandsliga was renamed Bremen-Liga. This however did not change anything in regards of the Landesliga.

Of the German tier-six leagues, the Landesliga Bremen, like its association, the Bremen FA, is unique as it covers the smallest region and has no league parallel to itself, being the only league at this level in the state.

The league champion, together with the runners-up, is directly promoted to the Oberliga.

Below it sits the tier-seven league, the: Bezirksliga Bremen.

== Recent winners of the Landesliga Bremen ==
Season	Champions	Runners-up
2002–03	Birkumer SV	GSV Hippokrates
2003–04	1. FC Burg	Luessumer TV
2004–05	Blumenthaler SV	Tura Bremen
2005–06	FC Bremerhaven II	TSV Osterholz-Tenever
2006–07	TSV Wulsdorf	VfL 07 Bremen
2007–08	TuS Schwachhausen	SV Türkspor Bremen
2008–09	FC Oberneuland II	SV Grohn
2009–10	SC Weyhe	1. FC Burg
2010–11	Union 60 Bremen	TS Woltmershausen
2011–12	OT Bremen	Vatan Sport Bremen
2012–13	SV Grohn	VfL 07 Bremen
2013–14	TSV Grolland	Leher TS
2014–15	Bremer TS Neustadt	ESC Geestemünde
2015–16	FC Oberneuland	TSV Melchiorshausen
2016–17	BSC Hastedt	Vatan Sport Bremen
2017–18	SC Borgfeld	SFL Bremerhaven
2018–19	SV Hemelingen	Union 60 Bremen
2019–20	OSC Bremerhaven	KSV Vatan Sport
2020–21	Season annulled during COVID-19 pandemic in Germany	
2021–22	TS Woltmershausen	TuSpo Surheide
2022–23	TuRa Bremen	SC Vahr Blockdieck
