= VfB Oldenburg =

German football club

- Full name: Verein für Bewegungsspiele e.V. Oldenburg
- Nicknames: Die Marineblauen (The Navy Blues), Stolz des Nordens (Pride of the North)
- Founded: 17 October 1897; 128 years ago
- Stadium: Marschweg-Stadion
- Capacity: 15,200
- President: Helmut Jordan
- Head coach: Dario Fossi
- League: Regionalliga Nord (IV)
- 2025–26: Regionalliga Nord, 3rd of 18
- Website: vfb-oldenburg.de
Home colours	Away colours

VfB Oldenburg is a German association football club based in Oldenburg, Lower Saxony. In the 2022–23 season, they played in the 3. Liga, the third level of football in Germany.

== History ==
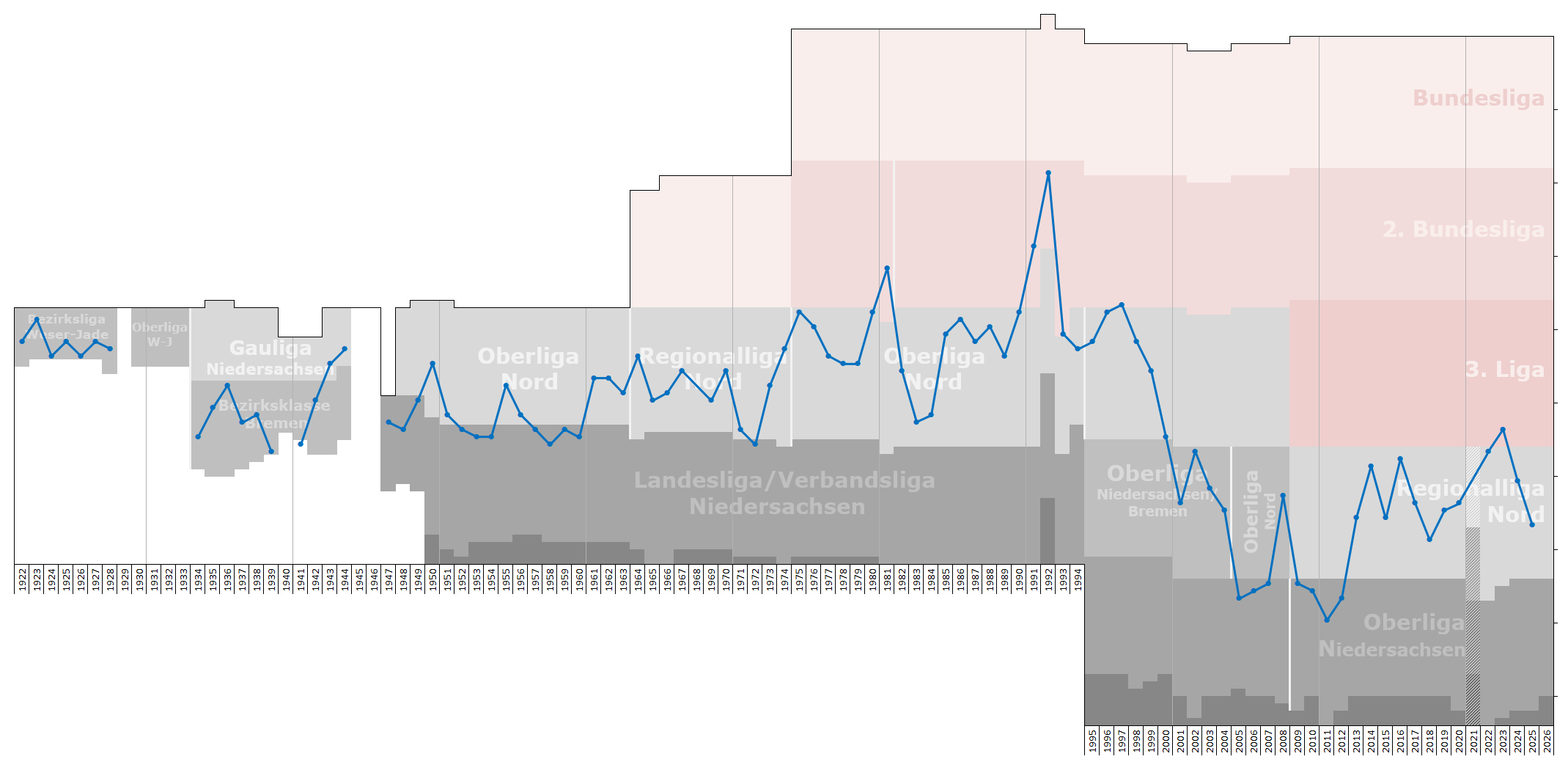
Historical chart of VfB Oldenburg league performance

Founded by a group of high school boys as FC 1897 Oldenburg on 17 October 1897, they merged with FV Germania 1903 Oldenburg in 1919 and adopted their current name. Their interests were football, cricket and track. Within a year the club acquired an old velodrome in Donnerschwee – part of the town of Oldenburg today – and converted it to a football ground.

The club played for two seasons in the Gauliga Weser-Ems (I), just before the end of the war, from 1942 to 1944.

After again restoring their ground in the aftermath of World War II, the club was able to pick up play in the Oberliga Nord in the 1949–50 season, but immediately found themselves relegated to tier II. They made another single season appearance in the upper league in 1955–56, before returning for a run of three seasons from 1960 to 1963 in the lead up to the formation of the Bundesliga, Germany's new professional football league. Oldenburg did not qualify for the new circuit and found themselves in the Regionalliga Nord (II). They played at that level until the mid-1970s when they slipped into the Amateur Oberliga Nord (III).

They enjoyed their highest league finish in 1991–92. They finished bottom of the third level in 1999–2000, and came close to being dissolved due to financial problems. After a decade of lower division play following relegation from the Regionalliga Nord in 2000, the club returned to this level in 2012 and played there until they were promoted to the 3. Liga in 2022 by beating BFC Dynamo in a promotion play-off.

== Stadium ==
Since 1991 VfB Oldenburg has been playing in the Marschweg-Stadion, which was opened in 1951. It has a capacity of 15,200, of which 4,500 are seats and 10,700 standing places. Its record attendance of 32,000 was achieved before reconstruction.

== Local derby and rivalries ==
VfB Oldenburg has a local derby rivalry with VfL Oldenburg. Aside from this, a fierce regional rivalry exists with SV Meppen.

== Players ==
=== Current squad ===
As of 8 September 2026

Note: Flags indicate national team as defined under FIFA eligibility rules; some limited exceptions apply. Players may hold more than one non-FIFA nationality.

No.	Pos.	Nation	Player
1	GK	GER	Jhonny Peitzmeier
3	DF	GER	Nico Mai
4	DF	GER	Leon Deichmann
5	DF	GER	Anouar Adam
7	FW	CRO	Vjekoslav Taritaš
8	MF	GER	Rafael Brand
9	MF	GER	Drilon Demaj
10	FW	GER	Leon Demaj
11	FW	GER	Kai Pröger
12	GK	GER	Hugo Jung
13	FW	GER	Linus Schäfer
14	MF	GER	Nelio Hemberger
17	MF	AUT	Patrick Möschl
18	FW	GER	Glory Kiveta

No.	Pos.	Nation	Player
19	MF	GER	Vincent Hagen
20	DF	GER	Marc Schröder
21	DF	GER	Nick Otto
22	FW	GER	Samuel Pfluger
23	MF	GER	Louis Hajdinaj
24	MF	GER	Dominik Kasper
25	GK	GER	Ole Springer
27	FW	GER	Abdul-Hussein Trad
29	FW	GER	Mats Facklam
30	FW	GER	Moses Otuali
33	DF	GER	Ngufor Anubodem
34	DF	GER	Ermal Pepshi
44	DF	GER	Nico Knystock

== Honours ==
- German amateur championship
  - Runners-up: 1988
- Niedersachsenliga West
  - Champions: 1952, 1957, 1959, 2007 (V)
- Niedersachsenliga
  - Champions: 1972, 2009 (V)
- Oberliga Nord (III)
  - Champions: 1975, 1980, 1990
- Regionalliga Nord
  - Champions: 1996 (III), 2022 (IV)
- Oberliga Niedersachsen/Bremen
  - Champions: 2002 (IV)
