= German amateur football championship =

- Founded
- 1950
- Disbanded
- 1998
- Nation
- Germany
- Number of Seasons
- 48
- Replaced by
- Competition disbanded
- Level on Pyramid
- Level 3
- Last Champions 1997–98
- Tennis Borussia Berlin

The German amateur football championship was a national football competition in Germany organized by the German Football Association (German: Deutscher Fußball-Bund; DFB) and in existence from 1950 to 1998.

== History ==
=== Overview ===
The championship was established in 1950 as a counterpart to the German football championship, which was open only to the winners of the tier-one Oberligas.

To qualify for the German amateur championship, a club had to play in the highest amateur league of its regional football federation. The majority of these leagues were tier-three leagues. Only in Niedersachsen, Bremen, Hamburg, Schleswig-Holstein and Berlin were these leagues set at the second level. From 1963, with the introduction of the Bundesliga, all these leagues became tier-three leagues, too.

To qualify for the amateur championship, a club either had to win its highest local amateur league and then not to have to take part in any post-season promotion-round. A club could also decline to take part in the promotion round and play in the amateur championship instead. Also, league winners who were reserve teams of professional clubs were ineligible for promotion to the professional level and had to play in the amateur championship instead. Mostly, however, the clubs playing in the championship were the runners-up of their leagues.

=== 1950 to 1955 ===
In the first five editions of the competition, the modus remained unchanged from season to season. Fifteen clubs competed in a knock-out system, whereby one club had a bye for the first round. Clubs paired against each other would only play one game to determine the winner of the tie. The competition only included teams from West Germany and West Berlin, East German clubs did not take part. Also, clubs from the Saarland did not take part either at this stage. The fifteen clubs came from the following leagues (tier):

- From the Southern region:
  - Amateurliga Bayern (III)
  - Amateurliga Württemberg (III)
  - Amateurliga Südbaden (III)
  - Amateurliga Nordbaden (III)
  - Amateurliga Hessen (III)
- From the Southwest region:
  - Amateurliga Rheinland (III)
  - Amateurliga Südwest (III)
  - Amateurliga Saarland (III) from 1955
- From the Western region:
  - Landesliga Niederrhein (III) in three regional divisions
  - Landesliga Mittelrhein (III) in two regional divisions
  - Landesliga Westfalen (III) in five regional divisions
- From the Northern region:
  - Amateurliga Bremen (II)
  - Landesliga Schleswig-Holstein (II)
  - Amateuroberliga Niedersachsen (II) in two regional divisions
  - Amateurliga Hamburg (II)
- From West Berlin:
  - Amateurliga Berlin (II)

From 1952, the knock-out system in the first round was replaced by a group stage, where in three groups of four and one group of three teams, a group winner was determined. This four winners then went on to the semi-finals.

=== 1955 to 1964 ===
The modus was altered in 1955, when, from then on, the five regions each determined their own champion. The five regional winners then qualified for the German amateur championship. The competition still operated on a knock-out system, but now only four games, ignoring possible replays, were played:

- A preliminary game between the West Berlin winner and one of the other four teams, altering on a yearly base.
- Two semi-final games
- The final

This system remained in place until the end of the 1963–64 season.

=== 1964 to 1978 ===
From the 1964–65 season, the sixteen regional champions, now with the Saarland, were again qualified for the competition. In a knock-out system, now with home-and-away games, the winner was determined. Only the final was played as an on-off match on neutral ground. Only in 1976–77 and 1977–78 was the final also played as a home-and-away contest. Otherwise, the modus remained unchanged until 1978, when the Amateur Oberligas were formed.

=== 1979 to 1991 ===
A league reform in 1978 reduced the number of tier-three leagues from sixteen to eight. Also, the leagues were renamed to Amateur Oberliga. The winner of each of those leagues qualified for the amateur championship, which was played as the years before, in a knock-out format with home-and-away games, including the final in the first season, 1978–79. From 1979 to 1980, the final was again played as a single game, but now as a home game for one of the two teams involved, to improve attendance figures.

The eight teams came from the following leagues:

- Amateur Oberliga Bayern
- Amateur Oberliga Baden-Württemberg
- Amateur Oberliga Hessen
- Amateur Oberliga Südwest
- Amateur Oberliga Berlin
- Amateur Oberliga Nordrhein
- Amateur Oberliga Westfalen
- Amateur Oberliga Nord

After the 1980–81 season, the winners of the eight leagues had to compete for 2. Bundesliga promotion. The amateur championship was therefore played out by the league runners-up from then on. This system in turn remained in place until the German reunion in 1991.

=== 1991 to 1994 ===
The effects of the German reunion changed the map of German football considerably and in regards of the German amateur championship, the number of teams qualified increased. East Germany and West-Berlin were sub-divided in three new Oberligas while the 'berliga Berlin was disbanded. The three new leagues were:

- NOFV-Oberliga Nord
- NOFV-Oberliga Mitte
- NOFV-Oberliga Süd

This meant, ten clubs, still the runners-up of their league, were now qualified for the competition. It was staged in two regional groups, north and south, with five teams each. Each team would play the other four in their group once and the two group winners would then stage the final. The 1991–92 competition marked a unique event, the Rot-Weiß Essen became the first and to-date only club to have taken out the German championship (1955) and the German amateur championship (1992) with its first team. Having won the German Cup in 1953, the club holds a unique triple of titles in German football.

This system only operated for three seasons, 1991–92, 1992–93 and 1993–94. It was replaced when the Regionalligas were established as the new tier-three leagues in Germany in 1994. From then on, the Oberligas were not the highest amateur leagues in the country any more.

=== 1994 to 1998 ===
Four Regionalligas were established in 1994 and the teams competing in the German amateur championship now came from these leagues:

- Regionalliga Nord
- Regionalliga Nordost
- Regionalliga West/Südwest
- Regionalliga Süd

In each of the three next seasons, four teams qualified for the competition in a varying set-up:

- 1994–95: runners-up of the four leagues
- 1995–96: champion Nordost, third placed West/Südwest, second and third placed Süd
- 1996–97: champion Nordost, second and third placed West/Südwest, third placed Süd

The variation in teams qualified from each league resulted in a different number of teams from each league being promoted to the 2. Bundesliga.

In its last season, the championship was played with only three teams, the runners-up from West/Südwest and Süd and the winner of Nordost. Each played each other once only and the group winner Tennis Borussia Berlin was named German amateur champion. Additionally, the club was promoted to the 2. Bundesliga. This last edition, played without a final for the first time, was much more a promotion round with the amateur title being only a footnote.

=== Disbanding and current status ===
A lack of interest in the competition led to its being disbanded. It suffered from being regarded as a competition for failed clubs that had missed out on more meaningful regional or national honours, or that had missed promotion to a higher level of play. Attempts to make the competition more attractive by allowing the top teams of the competition into the German Cup tournament had little effect.

In May 2006, the chairman of the DFB (German Football Association), Theo Zwanziger, voiced his interest in re-establishing a national amateur championship from 2008 onwards, after the 3. Liga was to be formed. He left open as to whether the competition should be for the winners of Regionalliga (IV) or Oberliga (V) play.

=== Media ===
The SC Jülich, the only club to win the title three times in a row, was the feature of a documentary by a German sports network, the Deutsches Sportfernsehen — DSF, about Germany's most successful amateur club. The club had fallen on hard times and almost folded in the 1990s, dropping to the lowest tier of the local league system before recovering.

== List of winners ==
In its almost fifty-year history, the competition had thirty-eight different winners.

=== Finals 1950 to 1997 ===
Year	Champion	Runner-Up	Result	Date	Venue	Attendance
1950–51	ATSV 1860 Bremen	Karlsruher FV	3–2	30 June 1951	Berlin	70,000
1951–52	VfR Schwenningen	Cronenberger SC	5–2	22 June 1952	Ludwigshafen	80,000
1952–53	SV Bergisch Gladbach 09	Homberger SpV	3–2	28 June 1953	Wuppertal	35,000
1953–54	TSV Marl-Hüls	SpVgg Neu-Isenburg	6–1	26 June 1954	Gelsenkirchen	15,000
1954–55	Sportfreunde Siegen	SpVgg Bad Homburg	5–0	25 June 1955	Wetzlar	15,000
1955–56	SpVgg Neu-Isenburg	VfB Speldorf	3–2	24 June 1956	Berlin	25,000
1956–57	VfL Benrath	Alemannia 90 Berlin	4–2	23 June 1957	Hannover	60,000
1957–58	FV Hombruch 09	ASV Bergedorf 85	3–1	14 June 1958	Dortmund	20,000
1958–59	FC Singen 04	Arminia Hannover	3–2	14 June 1959	Offenburg	9,000
1959–60	Hannover 96 Amateure	BV Osterfeld	1–1 aet / 3–0	26 & 29 June 1960	Herford	12,000 & 9,000
1960–61	KSV Holstein Kiel Amateure	SV Siegburg 04	5–1	24 June 1961	Hannover	70,000
1961–62	SC Tegel Berlin	Tura Bonn	1–0	30 June 1962	Wuppertal	12,000
1962–63	VfB Stuttgart Amateure	VfL Wolfsburg	1–0	6 July 1963	Kassel	10,000
1963–64	Hannover 96 Amateure	SV Wiesbaden	2–0	27 June 1964	Hagen	10,000
1964–65	Hannover 96 Amateure	SV Wiesbaden	2–1	27 June 1965	Siegen	8,000
1965–66	SV Werder Bremen Amateure	Hannover 96 Amateure	5–1	2 July 1966	Herford	10,000
1966–67	STV Horst Emscher	Hannover 96 Amateure	2–0	1 July 1967	Herford	8,500
1967–68	VfB Marathon Remscheid	FC Wacker München	5–3 aet	9 June 1968	Bochum	10,000
1968–69	SC Jülich	SpVgg Erkenschwick	2–1	12 July 1969	Krefeld	12,000
1969–70	SC Jülich	Eintracht Braunschweig Amateure	3–0	11 July 1970	Siegen	8,000
1970–71	SC Jülich	VfB Stuttgart Amateure	1–0	10 July 1971	Würzburg	6,000
1971–72	FSV Frankfurt	TSV Marl-Hüls	2–1	8 July 1972	Neuwied	10,000
1972–73	SpVgg Bad Homburg	1. FC Kaiserslautern Amateure	1–0	30 June 1973	Offenbach	7,000
1973–74	SSV Reutlingen	VfB Marathon Remscheid	2–2 aet / 2–1	29 June 1974	Worms	5,000 & 2,500
1974–75	VfR Oli Bürstadt	Victoria Hamburg	3–0	29 June 1975	Ludwigsburg	8,000
1975–76	SV Holzwickede	VfR Oli Bürstadt	1–0	27 June 1976	Oldenburg	750
1976–77	Fortuna Düsseldorf Amateure	SV Sandhausen	1–0 / 2–2	22 & 26 June 1977	Düsseldorf & Sandhausen	8,000 & 10,000
1977–78	SV Sandhausen	ESV Ingolstadt	2–0 / 1–1	24 & 28 June 1978	Ingolstadt & Sandhausen	2,100 & 5,000
1978–79	ESV Ingolstadt	Hertha Zehlendorf	4–1 / 0–1	27 & 30 June 1979	Ingolstadt & Berlin	3,000 & 3,600
1979–80	VfB Stuttgart Amateure	FC Augsburg	2–1	20 June 1980	Stuttgart	2,000
1980–81	1. FC Köln Amateure	FC St. Pauli	2–0	14 June 1981	Cologne	7,500
1981–82	FSV Mainz	SV Werder Bremen Amateure	3–0	17 June 1982	Mainz	8,000
1982–83	FC 08 Homburg	FC Bayern München Amateure	2–0 aet	17 June 1983	Homburg	6,000
1983–84	Offenburger FV	SC Eintracht Hamm	4–1	16 June 1984	Offenburg	8,000
1984–85	SV Werder Bremen Amateure	DSC Wanne-Eickel	3–0	22 June 1985	Bremen	3,000
1985–86	BVL 08 Remscheid	VfR Oli Bürstadt	2–1 aet	21 June 1986	Remscheid	8,000
1986–87	MSV Duisburg	FC Bayern München Amateure	4–1	21 June 1987	Duisburg	10,000
1987–88	Eintracht Trier	VfB Oldenburg	0–0 aet, 5–4 pen	19 June 1988	Oldenburg	7,000
1988–89	Eintracht Trier	SpVgg Bad Homburg	1–1 aet, 5–4 pen	17 June 1989	Trier	5,500
1989–90	FSV Salmrohr	Rheydter SpV	2–0	10 June 1990	Salmrohr	3,000
1990–91	SV Werder Bremen Amateure	SpVgg 07 Ludwigsburg	2–1	9 June 1991	Ludwigsburg	4,500
1991–92	Rot-Weiss Essen	SpVgg Bad Homburg	3–2 aet	13 June 1992	Essen	6,395
1992–93	SV Sandhausen	SV Werder Bremen Amateure	2–0		Sandhausen	3,000
1993–94	SC Preußen Münster	Kickers Offenbach	1–0	11 June 1994	Offenbach	6,000
1994–95	VfL Osnabrück	Stuttgarter Kickers	4–2 aet	13 June 1995	Stuttgart	1,194
1995–96	SSV Ulm 1846	VfR Mannheim	2–1	15 June 1996	Ulm	500
1996–97	SSV Reutlingen	Rot-Weiß Oberhausen	2–1		Oberhausen	1,600

Source:"(West) Germany — Amateur Championship Finals". RSSSF.

=== Group winners 1998 ===
Year	Champion	Runner-Up
1997–98	Tennis Borussia Berlin	Sportfreunde Siegen

=== Winners and runners-up statistics ===
Club	Championships	Runners-up
Hannover 96 Amateure	3	2
SV Werder Bremen Amateure	3	2
SC Jülich	3	0
VfB Stuttgart Amateure	2	1
SV Sandhausen	2	1
SSV Reutlingen	2	0
Eintracht Trier	2	0
SpVgg Bad Homburg	1	3
VfR Oli Bürstadt	1	2
TSV Marl-Hüls	1	1
Sportfreunde Siegen	1	1
SpVgg Neu-Isenburg	1	1
VfB Marathon Remscheid	1	1
ESV Ingolstadt	1	1
VfL Osnabrück	1	1
ATSV 1860 Bremen	1	0
VfR Schwenningen	1	0
SV Bergisch Gladbach 09	1	0
VfL 06 Benrath	1	0
FV Hombruch 09	1	0
FC Singen 04	1	0
KSV Holstein Kiel Amateure	1	0
SC Tegel Berlin	1	0
STV Horst-Emscher	1	0
FSV Frankfurt	1	0
SV Holzwickede	1	0
Fortuna Düsseldorf Amateure	1	0
1. FC Köln Amateure	1	0
FSV Mainz 05	1	0
FC 08 Homburg	1	0
Offenburger FV	1	0
BVL 08 Remscheid	1	0
MSV Duisburg	1	0
FSV Salmrohr	1	0
Rot-Weiß Essen	1	0
SC Preußen Münster	1	0
SSV Ulm 1846	1	0
Tennis Borussia Berlin	1	0

== First edition 1950–51: clubs ==
Fifteen teams took part in the competitions first edition, taking place in June 1951, qualified from the following leagues:

- Amateurliga Bremen (runners-up): ATSV Bremen 1860
- Amateurliga Nordbaden (runners-up): Karlsruher FV
- Landesliga Niederrhein (winner group 1): SC Cronenberg
- Landesliga Mittelrhein (winner group 1): SSV Troisdorf 05
- Landesliga Schleswig-Holstein (runners-up): Heider SV
- Amateurliga Württemberg (runners-up): VfL Sindelfingen
- Amateuroberliga Niedersachsen (runners-up): SSV Delmenhorst
- Amateurliga Hessen (runners-up): Borussia Fulda
- Amateurliga Berlin (champion): VfL Nord Berlin
- Amateurliga Südbaden (champion): FC 08 Villingen
- Rheinland region: VfL Neuwied
- Amateurliga Hamburg (3rd placed): Union Altona
- Amateurliga Bayern (runners-up): FC Bayreuth
- Landesliga Westfalen (champion): SpVgg Röhlinghausen
- Südwest region: SC Zweibrücken

== Notes ==
=== Note on the term amateur ===
The term "amateur" in German football nowadays does not quite mean the same as in other countries; it does not as such indicate that a player does not get paid but rather means the player is paid below a certain level, often a so-called Aufwandsentschädigung, which literally means "reimbursement of costs". Rather, in comparison with the league system in the United Kingdom, the term amateur could be translated with non-league.

Up until the formation of the Regionalligas, reserve teams of professional clubs carried the title Amateure behind the club name to distinguish first from second team. Because these teams are not truly amateurs, these teams now, like all other reserve sides, carry the II behind the name, for example, VfB Stuttgart Amateure became VfB Stuttgart II.

=== Attendance figures ===
The high number of spectators in the 1951, 1952, 1957 and 1961 finals results from the fact that the games were held as curtain raisers for the German championship finals.
