= 2021–22 Regionalliga =

14th season of the Regionalliga

Regionalliga
- Season: 2021–22
- Champions: VfB Oldenburg (Nord); BFC Dynamo (Nordost); Rot-Weiss Essen (West); SV Elversberg (Südwest); SpVgg Bayreuth (Bayern)
- Promoted: Rot-Weiss Essen; SV Elversberg; SpVgg Bayreuth; VfB Oldenburg
- Relegated: Lüneburger SK Hansa; HSC Hannover; Altona 93; FC Oberneuland; Heider SV; FC Eilenburg; Union Fürstenwalde; Optik Rathenow; VfB Auerbach; Tasmania Berlin; Bonner SC; FC Wegberg-Beeck; Sportfreunde Lotte; KFC Uerdingen; VfB Homberg; Sonnenhof Großaspach; Schott Mainz; FK Pirmasens; FC Gießen; SC Eltersdorf; FC Memmingen; SV Schalding-Heining; 1860 Rosenheim

The 2021–22 Regionalliga was the 14th season of the Regionalliga, the tenth under the new format, as the fourth tier of the German football league system.

== Format ==
According to the promotion rules decided upon in 2019, the Regionalliga Südwest and West received a direct promotion spot. Based on a rotation principle, the Regionalliga Bayern also received the third direct promotion spot this season, while the Regionalliga Nord and Nordost champions played a promotion play-off.

== Regionalliga Nord ==
21 teams from the states of Bremen, Hamburg, Lower Saxony and Schleswig-Holstein competed in the tenth season of the reformed Regionalliga Nord. VfB Lübeck was relegated from the 2020–21 3. Liga. Originally, SV Meppen was also relegated from the 3. Liga, but was spared after KFC Uerdingen did not receive a license. No teams were promoted from the 2020–21 Oberliga Niedersachsen, 2020–21 Oberliga Hamburg, 2020–21 Bremen-Liga or 2020–21 Schleswig-Holstein-Liga since the seasons were abandoned.

The league was split into two regional groups again. The composition of the groups was retained from the previous season, with the exception of Lüneburger SK Hansa, who were moved to the southern group to balance out the group sizes.

=== Nord ===
Pos	Team	Pld	W	D	L	GF	GA	GD	Pts	Qualification
1	Holstein Kiel II	20	12	5	3	39	19	+20	41	Qualification for the championship round
2	Weiche Flensburg	20	11	5	4	39	24	+15	38	Qualification for the championship round
3	Teutonia Ottensen	20	10	6	4	39	24	+15	36	Qualification for the championship round
4	Hamburger SV II	20	10	4	6	36	27	+9	34	Qualification for the championship round
5	VfB Lübeck	20	10	3	7	40	23	+17	33	Qualification for the championship round
6	SV Drochtersen/Assel	20	8	9	3	23	18	+5	33	Qualification for the relegation round
7	FC St. Pauli II	20	6	6	8	23	29	−6	24	Qualification for the relegation round
8	Eintracht Norderstedt	20	5	8	7	33	31	+2	23	Qualification for the relegation round
9	Phönix Lübeck	20	5	6	9	27	40	−13	21	Qualification for the relegation round
10	Heider SV	20	2	3	15	17	46	−29	9	Qualification for the relegation round
11	Altona 93	20	2	3	15	17	52	−35	9	Qualification for the relegation round

Source: kicker.de
Rules for classification: 1) Points; 2) Goal difference; 3) Goals scored

==== Top scorers ====
Rank	Player	Club	Goals
1	(Germany) Marcel Cornils	Weiche Flensburg	10
2	(Germany) Mats Facklam	Teutonia Ottensen	9
2	(Germany) Fabian Istefo	Teutonia Ottensen	9
2	(Germany) Jan Lüneburg	Eintracht Norderstedt	9
5	(Germany) Malek Fakhro	VfB Lübeck	8
5	(Germany) Christopher Kramer	Weiche Flensburg	8

=== Süd ===
Pos	Team	Pld	W	D	L	GF	GA	GD	Pts	Qualification
1	VfB Oldenburg	18	13	4	1	45	12	+33	43	Qualification for the championship round
2	Werder Bremen II	18	13	3	2	47	13	+34	42	Qualification for the championship round
3	VfV Hildesheim	18	9	2	7	32	34	−2	29	Qualification for the championship round
4	Atlas Delmenhorst	18	6	7	5	22	22	0	25	Qualification for the championship round
5	Hannover 96 II	18	7	3	8	28	23	+5	24	Qualification for the championship round
6	SSV Jeddeloh	18	6	6	6	25	28	−3	24	Qualification for the relegation round
7	Schwarz-Weiß Rehden	18	4	6	8	29	35	−6	18	Qualification for the relegation round
8	Lüneburger SK Hansa	18	3	7	8	15	28	−13	16	Qualification for the relegation round
9	HSC Hannover	18	4	3	11	18	42	−24	15	Qualification for the relegation round
10	FC Oberneuland	18	3	3	12	11	35	−24	12	Qualification for the relegation round

Source: kicker.de
Rules for classification: 1) Points; 2) Goal difference; 3) Goals scored

==== Top scorers ====
Rank	Player	Club	Goals
1	(Germany) Justin Njinmah	Werder Bremen II	14
1	(Netherlands) Tim van de Schepop	Werder Bremen II	14
3	(Germany) Malte Meyer	Lüneburger SK Hansa	10
4	(Kosovo) Kamer Krasniqi	Schwarz-Weiß Rehden	9
5	(Poland) Maik Łukowicz	VfB Oldenburg	8

=== Championship round ===
All results achieved against other teams qualified for the championship round were retained. The teams only played against teams from the other regional division.

Pos	Team	Pld	W	D	L	GF	GA	GD	Pts	Qualification
1	VfB Oldenburg (C, O, P)	18	11	6	1	32	13	+19	39	Qualification for promotion play-offs
2	Weiche Flensburg	18	11	2	5	28	21	+7	35	
3	Werder Bremen II	18	9	2	7	33	18	+15	29	
4	Holstein Kiel II	18	8	4	6	24	16	+8	28	
5	VfB Lübeck	18	7	5	6	23	17	+6	26	
6	Hamburger SV II	18	7	3	8	28	30	−2	24	
7	Teutonia Ottensen	18	6	6	6	31	37	−6	24	
8	Atlas Delmenhorst	18	4	6	8	18	28	−10	18	
9	Hannover 96 II	18	4	4	10	27	33	−6	16	
10	VfV Hildesheim	18	2	4	12	18	49	−31	10	

Source: kicker.de
Rules for classification: 1) Points; 2) Goal difference; 3) Goals scored
(C) Champions; (O) Play-off winners; (P) Promoted

==== Top scorers ====
Rank	Player	Club	Goals
1	(Guinea) Moussa Doumbouya	Hannover 96 II	8
1	(Germany) Christopher Kramer	Weiche Flensburg	8
3	(Germany) Mats Facklam	Teutonia Ottensen	6
4	(Germany) Ayodele Adetula	VfB Oldenburg	5
5	(Germany) Rafael Brand	VfB Oldenburg	4
5	(Poland) Mateusz Ciapa	VfB Lübeck	4
5	(Germany) Marcel Cornils	Weiche Flensburg	4
5	(Germany) Can Düzel	Teutonia Ottensen	4
5	(Germany) Kevin Schulz	Weiche Flensburg	4

=== Relegation round ===
All results achieved against other teams qualified for the relegation round were retained. The teams only played against teams from the other regional division.

Pos	Team	Pld	W	D	L	GF	GA	GD	Pts	Relegation
11	Phönix Lübeck	20	14	3	3	40	19	+21	45	
12	Eintracht Norderstedt	20	10	9	1	37	12	+25	39	
13	SSV Jeddeloh	20	10	8	2	34	17	+17	38	
14	SV Drochtersen/Assel	20	9	7	4	28	16	+12	34	
15	Schwarz-Weiß Rehden	20	8	5	7	39	30	+9	29	
16	FC St. Pauli II	20	7	5	8	29	26	+3	26	
17	Lüneburger SK Hansa (R)	20	5	7	8	15	27	−12	22	Relegation to Oberliga
18	HSC Hannover (R)	20	4	7	9	24	39	−15	19	Relegation to Oberliga
19	Altona 93 (R)	20	3	8	9	22	35	−13	17	Relegation to Oberliga
20	FC Oberneuland (R)	20	4	4	12	21	44	−23	16	Relegation to Oberliga
21	Heider SV (R)	20	3	3	14	23	47	−24	12	Relegation to Oberliga

Source: kicker.de
Rules for classification: 1) Points; 2) Goal difference; 3) Goals scored
(R) Relegated

==== Top scorers ====
Rank	Player	Club	Goals
1	(Germany) Haris Hyseni	Phönix Lübeck	8
2	(Germany) Fabian Graudenz	Phönix Lübeck	7
2	(Kosovo) Kamer Krasniqi	Schwarz-Weiß Rehden	7
4	(Germany) Pelle Hoppe	Eintracht Norderstedt	6
5	(Germany) Ashton Götz	SV Drochtersen/Assel	5
5	(Germany) Jan Lüneburg	Eintracht Norderstedt	5

== Regionalliga Nordost ==
20 teams from the states of Berlin, Brandenburg, Mecklenburg-Vorpommern, Saxony, Saxony-Anhalt and Thuringia competed in the tenth season of the reformed Regionalliga Nordost. Tasmania Berlin was promoted from the 2020–21 NOFV-Oberliga Nord and FC Eilenburg was promoted from the 2020–21 NOFV-Oberliga Süd.

Pos	Team	Pld	W	D	L	GF	GA	GD	Pts	Qualification or relegation
1	BFC Dynamo (C)	38	25	7	6	84	32	+52	82	Qualification for promotion play-offs
2	Carl Zeiss Jena	38	23	7	8	71	35	+36	76	
3	Energie Cottbus	38	21	11	6	85	35	+50	74	
4	VSG Altglienicke	38	21	9	8	80	47	+33	72	
5	Chemnitzer FC	38	20	12	6	67	37	+30	72	
6	Lokomotive Leipzig	38	21	8	9	71	42	+29	71	
7	Berliner AK	38	21	6	11	65	48	+17	69	
8	Hertha BSC II	38	17	9	12	69	49	+20	60	
9	Chemie Leipzig	38	16	8	14	47	48	−1	56	
10	Tennis Borussia Berlin	38	14	11	13	59	50	+9	53	
11	SV Babelsberg	38	14	11	13	46	42	+4	53	
12	FSV Luckenwalde	38	14	8	16	58	50	+8	50	
13	SV Lichtenberg	38	12	8	18	49	64	−15	44	
14	ZFC Meuselwitz	38	11	8	19	42	54	−12	41	
15	Germania Halberstadt	38	11	8	19	48	68	−20	41	
16	FC Eilenburg (R)	38	8	9	21	41	79	−38	33	Relegation to NOFV-Oberliga
17	Union Fürstenwalde (R)	38	8	9	21	49	89	−40	33	Relegation to NOFV-Oberliga
18	Optik Rathenow (R)	38	5	15	18	48	81	−33	30	Relegation to NOFV-Oberliga
19	VfB Auerbach (R)	38	5	8	25	45	95	−50	23	Relegation to NOFV-Oberliga
20	Tasmania Berlin (R)	38	3	8	27	28	107	−79	17	Relegation to NOFV-Oberliga

Source: kicker.de
Rules for classification: 1) Points; 2) Goal difference; 3) Goals scored
(C) Champions; (R) Relegated

=== Top scorers ===
Rank	Player	Club	Goals
1	(Germany) Christian Beck	BFC Dynamo	23
2	(Germany) Fabian Eisele	Carl Zeiss Jena	22
3	(Germany) Djamal Ziane	Lokomotive Leipzig	21
4	(Germany) Erik Engelhardt	Energie Cottbus	19
5	(Germany) Daniel Frahn	SV Babelsberg	18

== Regionalliga West ==
20 teams from North Rhine-Westphalia competed in the tenth season of the reformed Regionalliga West. KFC Uerdingen was relegated from the 2020–21 3. Liga. No teams were promoted from the 2020–21 Mittelrheinliga, 2020–21 Oberliga Niederrhein or 2020–21 Oberliga Westfalen since the seasons were abandoned.

Pos	Team	Pld	W	D	L	GF	GA	GD	Pts	Promotion or relegation
1	Rot-Weiss Essen (C, P)	38	26	9	3	84	32	+52	87	Promotion to 3. Liga
2	Preußen Münster	38	26	9	3	73	24	+49	87	
3	Wuppertaler SV	38	23	9	6	68	28	+40	78	
4	Rot-Weiß Oberhausen	38	22	9	7	68	35	+33	75	
5	Fortuna Köln	38	20	14	4	62	31	+31	74	
6	SV Rödinghausen	38	19	7	12	45	35	+10	64	
7	1. FC Köln II	38	17	11	10	70	49	+21	62	
8	SC Wiedenbrück	38	14	13	11	48	37	+11	55	
9	Schalke 04 II	38	13	8	17	58	65	−7	47	
10	Rot Weiss Ahlen	38	11	14	13	50	67	−17	47	
11	Fortuna Düsseldorf II	38	12	10	16	59	62	−3	46	
12	Alemannia Aachen	38	11	11	16	43	51	−8	44	
13	Borussia Mönchengladbach II	38	12	7	19	42	51	−9	43	
14	SV Lippstadt	38	12	7	19	54	65	−11	43	
15	SV Straelen	38	12	7	19	42	64	−22	43	
16	Bonner SC (R)	38	10	9	19	44	63	−19	39	Relegation to Oberliga
17	FC Wegberg-Beeck (R)	38	7	10	21	31	64	−33	31	Relegation to Oberliga
18	Sportfreunde Lotte (R)	38	9	3	26	36	63	−27	30	Relegation to Oberliga
19	KFC Uerdingen (R)	38	6	9	23	39	96	−57	27	Relegation to Oberliga
20	VfB Homberg (R)	38	6	8	24	30	64	−34	26	Relegation to Oberliga

Source: kicker.de
Rules for classification: 1) Points; 2) Goal difference; 3) Goals scored
(C) Champions; (P) Promoted; (R) Relegated

=== Top scorers ===
Rank	Player	Club	Goals
1	(Germany) Simon Engelmann	Rot-Weiss Essen	24
2	(Germany) Cagatay Kader	SV Straelen	16
2	(Germany) Sascha Marquet	Fortuna Köln	16
4	(Germany) Serhat Semih Güler	Bonner SC	14
4	(Germany) Sven Kreyer	Rot-Weiß Oberhausen	14

== Regionalliga Südwest ==
19 teams from Baden-Württemberg, Hesse, Rhineland-Palatinate and Saarland competed in the tenth season of the Regionalliga Südwest. No teams were promoted from the 2020–21 Oberliga Rheinland-Pfalz/Saar, 2020–21 Oberliga Baden-Württemberg or 2020–21 Hessenliga since the seasons were abandoned.

Pos	Team	Pld	W	D	L	GF	GA	GD	Pts	Promotion or relegation
1	SV Elversberg (C, P)	36	24	8	4	79	29	+50	80	Promotion to 3. Liga
2	SSV Ulm	36	23	8	5	60	30	+30	77	
3	Kickers Offenbach	36	24	4	8	67	26	+41	76	
4	TSV Steinbach Haiger	36	20	10	6	62	35	+27	70	
5	Mainz 05 II	36	22	3	11	63	42	+21	69	
6	FC 08 Homburg	36	14	10	12	43	48	−5	52	
7	Hessen Kassel	36	13	12	11	46	37	+9	51	
8	TSG Balingen	36	13	7	16	46	64	−18	46	
9	Bahlinger SC	36	12	9	15	35	44	−9	45	
10	Astoria Walldorf	36	12	8	16	49	61	−12	44	
11	VfB Stuttgart II	36	12	7	17	49	52	−3	43	
12	VfR Aalen	36	12	7	17	49	60	−11	43	
13	1899 Hoffenheim II	36	10	11	15	45	50	−5	41	
14	Rot-Weiß Koblenz	36	9	12	15	36	44	−8	39	
15	FSV Frankfurt	36	9	12	15	40	53	−13	39	
16	Sonnenhof Großaspach (R)	36	11	6	19	42	64	−22	39	Relegation to Oberliga
17	Schott Mainz (R)	36	9	6	21	36	58	−22	33	Relegation to Oberliga
18	FK Pirmasens (R)	36	9	6	21	32	59	−27	33	Relegation to Oberliga
19	FC Gießen (R)	36	7	8	21	28	51	−23	29	Relegation to Oberliga

Source: kicker.de
Rules for classification: 1) Points; 2) Goal difference; 3) Goals scored; 4) Head-to-head points; 5) Head-to-head goal difference; 6) Head-to-head goals scored; 7) Head-to-head away goals scored; 8) Away goals scored; 9) Play-off (only when deciding promotion or relegation)
(C) Champions; (P) Promoted; (R) Relegated

=== Top scorers ===
Rank	Player	Club	Goals
1	(Germany) Nick Proschwitz	1899 Hoffenheim II	20
2	(Germany) Markus Mendler	FC 08 Homburg	18
3	(Spain) Israel Suero Fernández	SV Elversberg	15
4	(Germany) Jan Ferdinand	TSG Balingen	14
4	(Kosovo) Valdrin Mustafa	SV Elversberg	14

== Regionalliga Bayern ==
20 teams from Bavaria compete in the ninth season of the Regionalliga Bayern. Bayern Munich II and SpVgg Unterhaching were relegated from the 2020–21 3. Liga. SC Eltersdorf was promoted from the 2019–2021 Bayernliga Nord and FC Pipinsried was promoted from the 2019–2021 Bayernliga Süd.

Pos	Team	Pld	W	D	L	GF	GA	GD	Pts	Promotion, qualification or relegation
1	SpVgg Bayreuth (C, P)	38	30	3	5	103	39	+64	93	Promotion to 3. Liga and qualification for DFB-Pokal
2	Bayern Munich II	38	26	8	4	113	50	+63	86	
3	Wacker Burghausen	38	19	7	12	84	54	+30	64	
4	SpVgg Unterhaching	38	18	10	10	73	59	+14	64	
5	1. FC Schweinfurt	38	17	11	10	96	56	+40	62	
6	TSV Aubstadt	38	17	10	11	74	43	+31	61	
7	FV Illertissen	38	17	8	13	57	45	+12	59	
8	Viktoria Aschaffenburg	38	14	9	15	54	53	+1	51	
9	FC Augsburg II	38	14	8	16	68	70	−2	50	
10	VfB Eichstätt	38	13	11	14	49	62	−13	50	
11	1. FC Nürnberg II	38	11	16	11	55	56	−1	49	
12	TSV Buchbach	38	12	12	14	50	46	+4	48	
13	FC Pipinsried	38	14	6	18	52	72	−20	48	
14	SV Heimstetten	38	14	5	19	56	68	−12	47	
15	TSV Rain am Lech	38	13	6	19	43	66	−23	45	
16	SC Eltersdorf (R)	38	12	5	21	55	84	−29	41	Qualification for relegation play-offs
17	Greuther Fürth II (O)	38	10	10	18	50	67	−17	40	Qualification for relegation play-offs
18	FC Memmingen (R)	38	9	11	18	44	72	−28	38	Relegation to Bayernliga
19	SV Schalding-Heining (R)	38	7	8	23	34	85	−51	29	Relegation to Bayernliga
20	1860 Rosenheim (R)	38	5	12	21	39	102	−63	27	Relegation to Bayernliga

Source: kicker.de
Rules for classification: 1) Points; 2) Goal difference; 3) Goals scored
(C) Champions; (O) Play-off winners; (P) Promoted; (R) Relegated

=== Top scorers ===
Rank	Player	Club	Goals
1	(Germany) Patrick Hobsch	SpVgg Unterhaching	28
2	(Germany) Adam Jabiri	1. FC Schweinfurt	25
3	(Croatia) Gabriel Vidović	Bayern Munich II	21
3	(Germany) Markus Ziereis	SpVgg Bayreuth	21
5	(Montenegro) Meris Skenderović	1. FC Schweinfurt	17

=== Relegation play-offs ===
Team 1	Agg.	Team 2	1st leg	2nd leg
SpVgg Ansbach	3–2	SC Eltersdorf	2–0	1–2
SV Donaustauf	0–10	Greuther Fürth II	0–6	0–4

== Promotion play-offs ==
The order of the legs was determined in a draw. The matches take place on 28 May and 4 June 2022.

Team 1	Agg.	Team 2	1st leg	2nd leg
BFC Dynamo	2–3	VfB Oldenburg	0–2	2–1

All times Central European Summer Time (UTC+2)

28 May 2022
14:00

BFC Dynamo	0–2	VfB Oldenburg
	Report	Ziętarski 28', 78'

Stadion im Sportforum, Berlin
Attendance: 4,240
Referee: Nicolas Winter
4 June 2022
14:00

VfB Oldenburg	1–2	BFC Dynamo
Wegner 34'	Report	Brandt 44'; Bolyki 90+6'

Marschweg-Stadion, Oldenburg
Attendance: 12,000
Referee: Patrick Alt

VfB Oldenburg won 3–2 on aggregate.
