= Dren Feka =

Kosovo Albanian footballer

Personal information
- Date of birth: 9 June 1997 (age 29)
- Place of birth: Bad Oldesloe, Germany
- Height: 1.83 m (6 ft 0 in)
- Position: Defensive midfielder

Team information
- Current team: FC Teutonia Ottensen
- Number: 10

Youth career
- –2009: TSV Bargteheide
- 2009–2015: Hamburger SV

Senior career*
Years	Team	Apps	(Gls)
2015–2017	Hamburger SV II	44	(3)
2017–2019	Luzern	6	(0)
2020	SV Drochtersen/Assel	1	(0)
2020–2021	VfB Lübeck	0	(0)
2021	Rot-Weiß Koblenz	0	(0)
2021–2022	Altona 93	21	(0)
2022–2023	1. FC Phönix Lübeck	10	(0)
2023–2024	Dukagjini	23	(0)
2024–	FC Teutonia Ottensen	13	(0)

International career^{‡}
2013	Germany U16	3	(0)
2013	Albania U17	3	(0)
2013	Germany U17	2	(0)
2015	Germany U19	2	(0)
2017–2018	Kosovo U21	6	(0)
- * Club domestic league appearances and goals as of 1 January 2025 ‡ National team caps and goals as of 23 May 2018

Dren Feka (born 9 June 1997) is a professional footballer who recently played as a defensive midfielder for German Regionalliga Nord club FC Teutonia Ottensen. Born in Germany, he represented it on junior levels before switching allegiance to Albania, back to Germany, and eventually Kosovo.

== Club career ==
=== Luzern ===
On 24 June 2017, Feka signed to Swiss Super League side Luzern. On 23 July 2017, he made his debut in a 1–0 home win against Lugano after being named in the starting line-up.

== International career ==
=== Albania ===
==== Under-17 ====
On 14 February 2013, Feka received a call-up from Albania U17 for the friendly matches against Slovenia U17 and Kosovo U17. On 20 February 2013, he making his debut with Albania U17 in match against Slovenia U17 after being named in the starting line-up.

=== Kosovo ===
==== Under-21 ====
On 6 November 2017, Feka received a call-up from Kosovo U21 for a 2019 UEFA European Under-21 Championship qualification matches against Israel U21 and Azerbaijan U21, On 9 November 2017, he made his debut with Kosovo U21 in match against Israel U21 after being named in the starting line-up.

==== Senior ====
On 23 May 2018, Feka received a call-up from Kosovo for a friendly match against Albania. He was an unused bench in that match.
