= Weidlich =

Weidlich is a surname. Notable people with the surname include:

- Bärbel Podeswa (née Weidlich; born 1946), East German hurdler
- Denis Weidlich (born 1986), Ghanaian-German footballer
- Helmut Weidlich (born 1937), German cross-country skier
- Kevin Weidlich (born 1989), German-Ghanaian footballer
