= Hagenow =

Town in Mecklenburg-Vorpommern, Germany

- Town
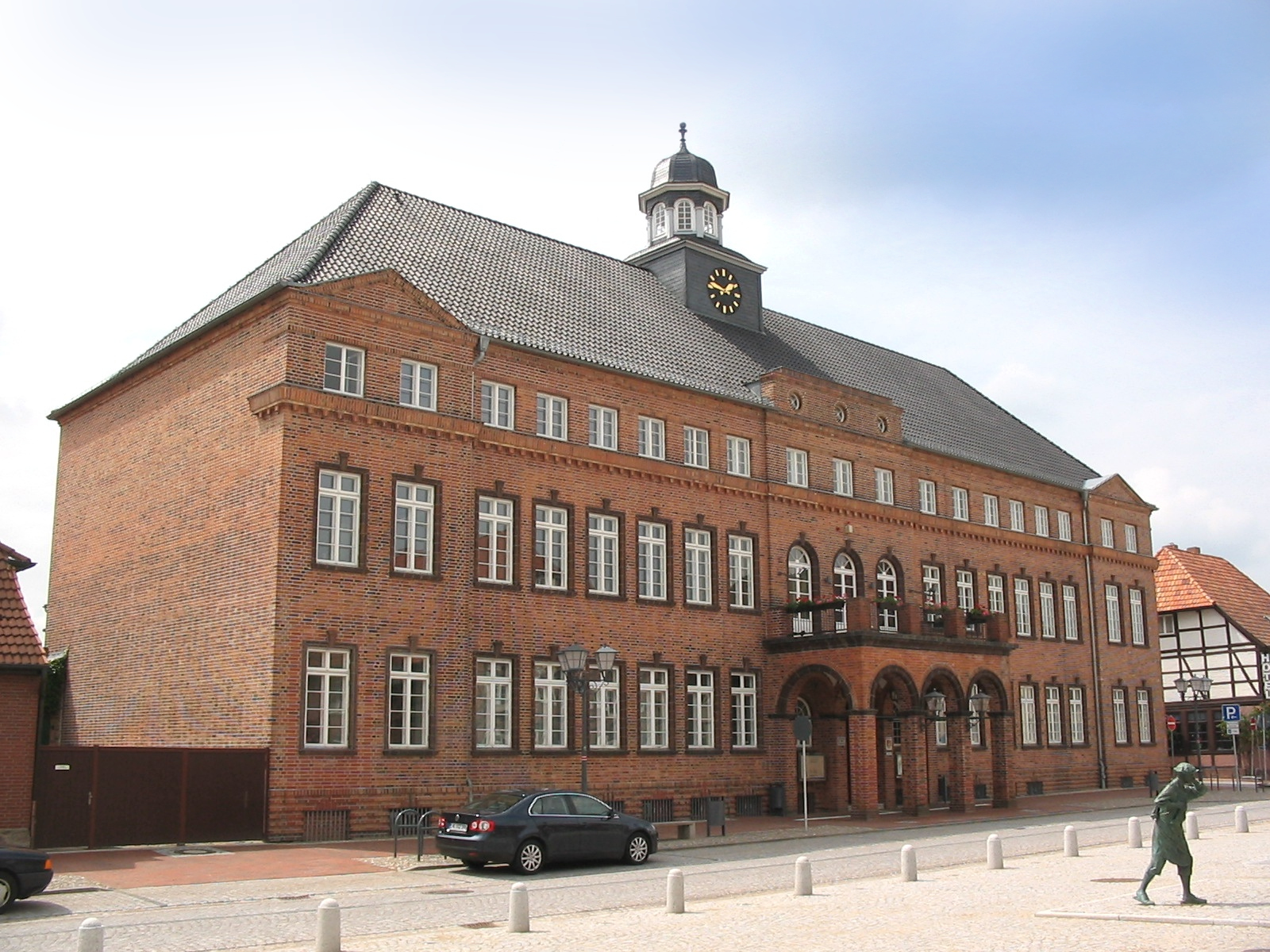
- Town hall of Hagenow

- Flag Coat of arms

- Location of Hagenow within Ludwigslust-Parchim district
- Interactive map of Hagenow
- Location within Germany Location within Mecklenburg-Vorpommern
- Coordinates: 53°25′N 11°11′E
- Country: Germany
- State: Mecklenburg-Vorpommern
- District: Ludwigslust-Parchim

Government
  - Mayor: Thomas Möller (Left)

Area
  - Total: 67.54 km^{2} (26.08 sq mi)
- Elevation: 25 m (82 ft)

Population (2025-12-31)
  - Total: 11,987
  - Density: 177.5/km^{2} (459.7/sq mi)
- Time zone: UTC+01:00 (CET)
  - Summer (DST): UTC+02:00 (CEST)
- Postal codes: 19230
- Dialling codes: 03883
- Vehicle registration: LUP
- Website: www.hagenow.de

Hagenow (German pronunciation: [ˈhaːɡəno]) is a German town in the southwest of Mecklenburg-Western Pomerania, in the district of Ludwigslust-Parchim, 30 kilometers south of Schwerin. Its population is approximately 11,300 inhabitants (2013).

Hagenow is part of the Hamburg Metropolitan Region.

== Sights and monuments ==
- Renovated old town, particularly along Lange Straße and Lindenplatz.
- Stadtkirche, built in 1875-1879 in Neo-Gothic style.
- Stadtmuseum (City Museum), located in an eighteenth-century half-timbered house.
- Städtischer Wasserturm Hagenow (watertower), 28 meters high, erected between 1905–1908 with Neo-Gothic windows. In 1938 the Luftwaffe commissioned the refurbishment of the tower.

=== Old synagogue ===
The Alte Synagoge or Hanna-Meinungen-Haus (old synagogue) is a former synagogue in the old town of Hagenow. Hirsch Samuel Meinungen purchased the plot in 1820, with the intention of building a synagogue for the then 80 person strong Jewish community in Hagenow. In 1828 the architectural complex contained a school/parish hall, a cart shed (where carts for funerals were kept), the synagogue with a Mikwe or Mikveh, a bath for the ritual immersion in Judaism. On August 15 of the same year, the solemn consecration of the temple took place.

Between 1839 and 1881, Jewish families from surrounding areas (i.e. Lübtheen and Vellahn) joined the Hagenow synagogue, however due to the absence of a permanent rabbi (in 1907) and a population migration to more affluent cities, the number of members dwindled and with them the funding and sponsorships for the synagogue. The last elected leader of the community, Samuel Meinungen (grandson of Hirsch S. Meinungen) proposed that the use of the prayer house should be changed. Although Meinungen never intended to sell the building, he considered renting it out to the Catholic church, a proposal rejected by the high council.

Due to the Nazi regime Meinungen and his family, including his infant daughter Hanna Meinungen (ca. 18 months), were deported to Auschwitz concentration camp, where Samuel Meinungen died on the 25.11.1937. Although untraceable, it is speculated that his entire family died around this time.

During the Kristallnacht (1938) most of the interior was destroyed, however due to its position within the town and the close proximity to adjacent properties, the building and the Mikwe remained largely intact. Extensive restoration of the Synagogue started in 2004 and lasted until 2009. Nowadays the building is used as a community hall, a museum and a venue for special events such as exhibitions from local schools.

== Government ==
On the 14.6.2015 Die Linke (The Left party) candidate Thomas Möller replaced SPD (social democrat) Gisela Schwarz as Mayor.

== Notable people ==
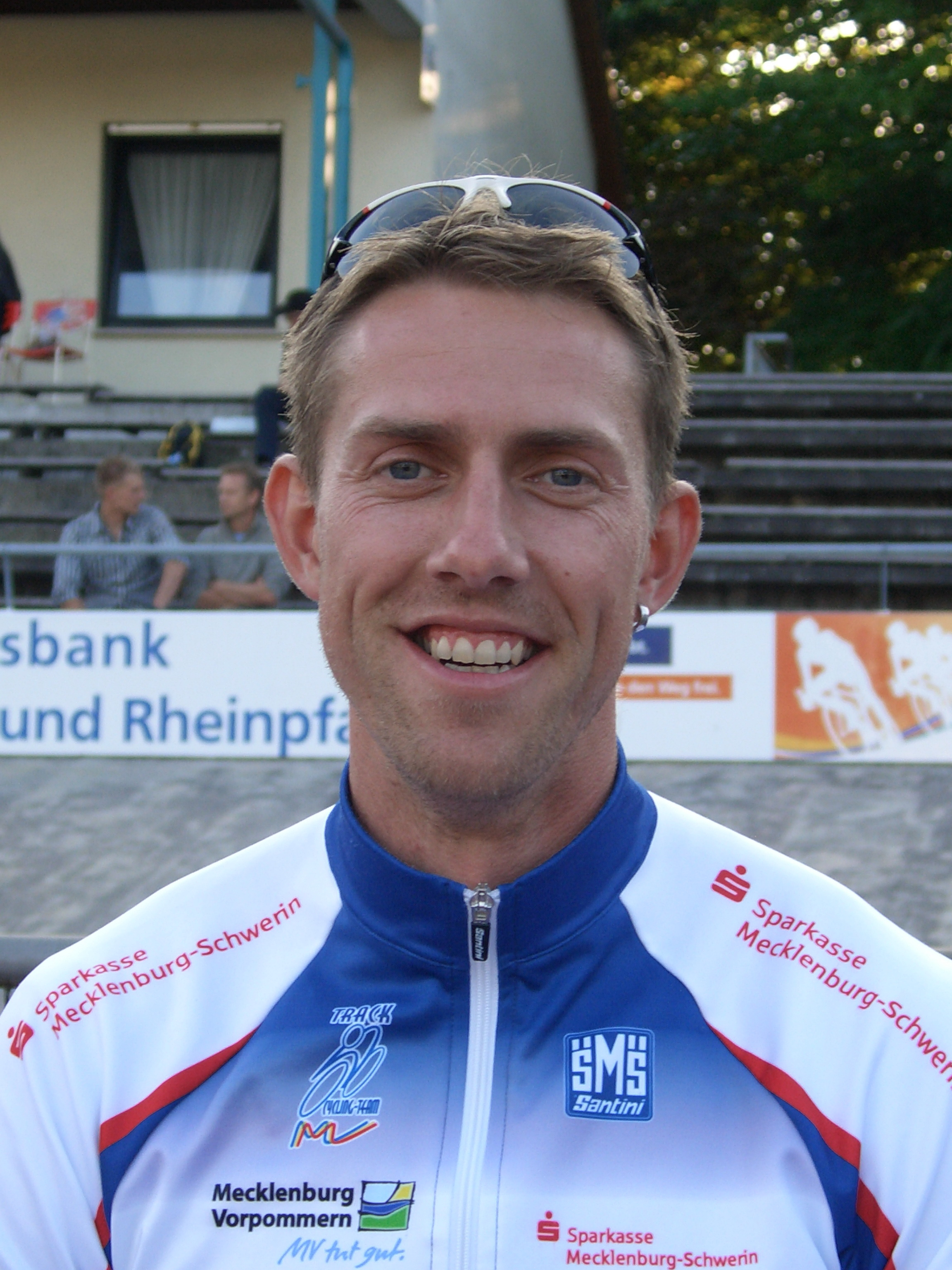
Stefan Nimke, 2010

- Charles Nelson (1835-1891), distiller in the USA
- Maria Kraus-Boelté (1836–1918), German-American educator, pioneer of Fröbel education in the USA
- Friedrich Heincke (1852–1929), zoologist and ichthyologist
- Robert Stock (1858-1912), an entrepreneur and telecommunications pioneer.
- Carl Schmidt (1868–1938), coptologist
- Karl Friedrich von Hagenow (1797– 1865), polymath
- Kurt Schröder (1888–1962), composer and conductor.
- Roland Brinkmann (1898–1995), geologist and paleontologist
- Karl-August Kamilli (born 1945), politician (SPD in the GDR, SPD)
- Andreas von Maltzahn (born 1961), Evangelical Lutheran theologian and bishop of the Evangelical Lutheran Church in Northern Germany
- Claudia Graue (born 1981), actress and singer

=== Sport ===
- Michael Timm (1962–2025), amateur boxer and boxing trainer
- Stefan Nimke (born 1978), multiple team Olympic cyclist and world champion track cyclist
- Lukas Pägelow (born 1994), footballer (LSK Hansa), played over 170 games
