= Emanuel Mirchev =

Bulgarian footballer (born 2002)

Personal information
- Date of birth: 9 February 2002 (age 24)
- Place of birth: Hamburg, Germany
- Height: 1.86 m (6 ft 1 in)
- Position: Midfielder

Team information
- Current team: Marek Dupnitsa
- Number: 55

Youth career
- 2011–2013: UH Adler
- 2013–2021: Hamburger SV

Senior career*
Years	Team	Apps	(Gls)
2021–2022	SC Verl	13	(0)
2022–2024	FC Teutonia Ottensen	40	(0)
2024–2025	Hessen Kassel	13	(0)
2025–2026	Eintracht Norderstedt	8	(0)

International career
2017	Germany U15	1	(0)
2019–2021	Bulgaria U19	8	(0)
2021–2024	Bulgaria U21	19	(0)
- * Club domestic league appearances and goals as of 15 November 2026

Emanuel Mirchev (Bulgarian: Емануел Мирчев; born 9 February 2002) is a professional footballer who plays as a midfielder for Vtora liga club FC Marek Dupnitsa. Born in Germany, he represented them at youth international level before switching his allegiance to Bulgaria.

== Club career ==
Mirchev is a former youth academy player of Hamburger SV. He joined German third division club SC Verl in June 2021. He made his professional debut for the club on 25 July in a goalless draw against Türkgücü München.

On 18 July 2024, Mirchev joined Hessen Kassel on a one-year contract until June 2025.

== International career ==
Mirchev is a former German youth national team player. He has played a friendly for under-15 team in 2017. He switched his allegiance to Bulgaria in 2019 and represented them at qualifiers of 2020 UEFA European Under-19 Championship.

== Personal life ==
Mirchev was born to Bulgarian parents who moved to Germany in 1991.

== Career statistics ==
As of 2 August 2022

Appearances and goals by club, season and competition
Club	Season	League			National Cup		Regional Cup		Other		Total	
Club	Season	Division	Apps	Goals	Apps	Goals	Apps	Goals	Apps	Goals	Apps	Goals
SC Verl	2021–22	3. Liga	13	0	—		5 (Note: Appearances in Westphalian Cup)	1	—		18	1
FC Teutonia Ottensen	2022–24	Regionalliga Nord	40	0	0	0	11	0	—		51	0
Career total			53	0	0	0	16	1	0	0	69	1

== Honours ==
FC Teutonia Ottensen

- Hamburg Cup: 2022–23, 2023–24
