= Kamer Krasniqi =

German-Kosovan footballer (born 1996)

Personal information
- Date of birth: 11 January 1996 (age 30)
- Place of birth: Osnabrück, Germany
- Height: 1.79 m (5 ft 10 in)
- Position: Midfielder

Team information
- Current team: SSV Jeddeloh
- Number: 10

Youth career
- –2009: Blau-Weiss DJK Schinkel
- 2009–2014: VfL Osnabrück

Senior career*
Years	Team	Apps	(Gls)
2014–2017	VfL Osnabrück II	51	(3)
2016–2019	VfL Osnabrück	30	(1)
2019–2022	Schwarz-Weiß Rehden	59	(23)
2020	→ Sonnenhof Großaspach (loan)	16	(0)
2022–2024	VfB Oldenburg	61	(13)
2024–2026	Sportfreunde Lotte	57	(8)
2026–	SSV Jeddeloh	10	(2)

International career
2017–2018	Kosovo U21	8	(0)
- * Club domestic league appearances and goals as of 22 September 2026

Kamer Krasniqi (born 11 January 1996) is a professional footballer who plays as a midfielder for Regionalliga Nord club SSV Jeddeloh. Born in Germany, he has represented the Kosovo U21 national team at international level.

== Club career ==
Born in Osnabrück, Germany, Krasniqi joined VfL Osnabrück in 2009. In June he signed a professional contract with the club due to run until 2018, having made his 3. Liga debut during the 2015–16 season. During his time at Osnabrück he made 30 appearances in the 3. Liga.

Krasniqi joined Regionalliga Nord side Schwarz-Weiß Rehden in summer 2019. He made 22 appearances in the 2019–20 season scoring five goals and making two assists. In January 2020 he joined Sonnenhof Großaspach of the 3. Liga until the end of the season. Sonnenhof Großaspach was relegated.

Krasniqi returned to Schwarz-Weiß Rehden in summer 2020. At the end of the 2021–22 season, in which he scored 16 goals and assisted 9 in 29 appearances, he received contract offers from multiple 3. Liga clubs.

In summer 2022 Krasniqi agreed a move to VfB Oldenburg which at the time was playing for promotion to the 3. Liga.

== International career ==
On 5 June 2017. Krasniqi received a call-up from Kosovo U21 for a 2019 UEFA European Under-21 Championship qualification match against Norway U21 and making his debut after being named in the starting line-up.

== Style of play ==
Krasniqi is known for his stamina and ball control.
