= Onur Capin =

German footballer

Personal information
- Date of birth: 10 July 1996 (age 30)
- Place of birth: Hanover, Germany
- Height: 1.75 m (5 ft 9 in)
- Position: Forward

Youth career
- Hannover 96

Senior career*
Years	Team	Apps	(Gls)
2013–2014	Hannover 96 II	4	(0)
2014–2017	Werder Bremen II	30	(3)
2017	Tuzlaspor	6	(1)
2018	Lüneburger SK Hansa	1	(0)
2018–2019	Hannoverscher SC	12	(1)
2019–2022	Arminia Hannover		
2024–2025	Arminia Hannover	18	(0)

International career
2012	Germany U17	2	(0)
- * Club domestic league appearances and goals as of 21:38, 23 September 2026 (UTC)

Onur Capin (born 10 July 1996) is a German footballer who plays as a forward.

== Career ==
In January 2017, Capin left Werder Bremen II for Tuzlaspor of the TFF Second League, the Turkish third tier.

In January 2018, he returned to Germany joining fourth-tier side Lüneburger SK Hansa.
