= SV Ahlerstedt/Ottendorf =

German football club

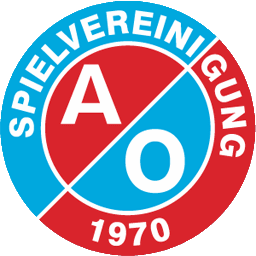
- Full name: Sportverein Ahlerstedt/Ottendorf 1970 e.V.
- Founded: 1970
- Chairman: Thorsten Mayer
- Head coach: Malte Bösch
- League: Bezirksliga (VII)
- 2015–16: Landesliga Lüneburg (VI), 14th (relegated)

SV Ahlerstedt/Ottendorf is a German association football club from Ahlerstedt, Lower Saxony, best known for its men's and women's teams in all age groups. The men's senior team plays in the Landesliga Lüneburg, the sixth tier in the league pyramid.

== History ==
The club was founded in 1970 and started its footballing life in the lower leagues of the Stade district. The men's squad first reached the Verbandsliga Niedersachsen (V) in 1976 but was relegated after two seasons. SV returned as Bezirksoberliga Lüneburg (VI) champions in 1988 back to the fifth tier, now called Landesliga West, and transferred to the eastern division after one season. In 1991, it finished at fifth place and three years later became a founding member of the renamed Bezirksliga Lüneburg (VI) after reforms in the league system. SV had another tenure in 2009 to the renamed Niedersachsenliga (V) as Lüneburg champions and, despite a 12th-place result, dropped back to the newly renamed Landesliga after another reform.

The women's squad was one of the original teams in the Regionalliga Nord (III), finishing fourth in 2004–05, and five seasons later it achieved its best ever third-place finish behind runner-up Mellendorfer TV. After a last-place finish and 13 seasons in the Regionalliga, the SV women slipped to the Oberliga Niedersachsen (IV).

== Honors ==
- Bezirksoberliga/Landesliga Lüneburg
  - Champions: 1988, 2009
- Bezirkspokal Stade
  - Winners: 1976
- Bezirkspokal Lüneburg
  - Winners: 1980

== Current squad ==
Autumn 2021 squad

Note: Flags indicate national team as defined under FIFA eligibility rules; some limited exceptions apply. Players may hold more than one non-FIFA nationality.

No.	Pos.	Nation	Player
1	GK	(Germany) GER	Jannis Trapp
4	MF	(Germany) GER	Maric Buchholz
5	MF	(Germany) GER	Corvin Höft
6	DF	(Germany) GER	Niklas Nissen
7	DF	(Germany) GER	Niklas Stange
8	MF	(Germany) GER	Dennis Klindworth
9	FW	(Germany) GER	Marc Holler
10	FW	(Germany) GER	Süleyman-Can Yaman
11	MF	(Germany) GER	Tom Klindworth
12	FW	(Germany) GER	Jelldrik Dallmann
13	DF	(Germany) GER	Sören Gloth
14	MF	(Mauritius) MRI	Malcolm Brunkhorst
15	DF	(Germany) GER	Nick Sommer
16	FW	(Germany) GER	Dariusch Hassunizadeh

No.	Pos.	Nation	Player
17	FW	(Germany) GER	Darvin Stüve
19	MF	(Germany) GER	Jannik Peters
21	MF	(Germany) GER	Lucas Hatecke
22	DF	(Germany) GER	Timo von Holt
23	DF	(Germany) GER	Jannes Heins
25	GK	(Germany) GER	Florian Bente
29	MF	(Germany) GER	Marcel Brunsch
30	DF	(Germany) GER	Niklas Niekerken
31	DF	(Germany) GER	Thore Nissen
32	MF	(Germany) GER	Luqman Krugemeier
—	GK	(Germany) GER	Chris Jergarsch
—	MF	(Germany) GER	Merten Hiller
—	FW	(Germany) GER	Luka Papke
