= Charles Nelson (businessman) =

German-American businessman (1835–1891)

Charles Nelson (July 4, 1835 – December 13, 1891) was a businessman and distiller in Middle Tennessee. He was the owner of Nelson's Greenbrier Distillery, which until American Prohibition, was one of the largest producers of whiskey in the United States.

== Early life ==
Charles Nelson was born on July 4, 1835, in Hagenow, Mecklenburg-Schwerin, Germany. Born a Lutheran, he was the oldest of six children whose father was a successful soap and candle manufacturer. At the age of 15, he came to America with his family. His father was lost at sea during the transit. The Nelsons embarked for the United States on the Helena Sloman with Nelson's father converting all of the family's wealth to gold that he carried on his person, concealed by clothing he had made especially for that purpose. During the voyage, the Helena Sloman encountered storms with gale-force winds, which resulted in many of the passengers being thrown overboard – the Nelson patriarch was one of these passengers, and with the weight of his family's fortune strapped to his person, he was pulled to the bottom of the Atlantic Ocean. Charles, along with his mother, brother, and four sisters, arrived in New York City with nothing but the clothes on their backs. While the mother looked after the young children, Charles and his brother found work with Hayes & Schultz Co., a producer of soap and candles in New York City. The family moved to Cincinnati in 1852. Nelson began working as a butcher, an experience which later helped him to open a grocery store under the name Blersch & Nelson.

== Career ==
In 1857 (or 1862), Charles moved to Nashville, Tennessee, opening another grocery branch under the name Nelson & Pfeiffer. Nelson's store quickly flourished, and became known especially for three products: coffee, meat, and whiskey. Nelson saw whiskey as the most profitable of his products, and began to concentrate solely on the production and bottling of his spirit. Among his more noteworthy sales techniques, it is known that Charles was one of the first to sell whiskey by the bottle rather than the jug or barrel. According to family records, Nelson encouraged his coffee delivery boy, Joel Cheek, to take his blend to the Maxwell House Hotel in downtown Nashville, where it later was famously proclaimed as “good to the last drop”. Nelson also encouraged his butcher, Horace G. Hill, to start his own business, which became known as H.G. Hill Food Stores and continues to operate as a Nashville-based company.

Nelson switched from grocery to distilling. Under the company name Chas. Nelson & Co., Nelson sought to expand the production of his whiskey. He began distilling his product through a contract distiller in the Nashville area. He purchased the Greenbrier Distillery in Robertson County, Tennessee. At the time of his death, he employed 200 men at the distillery.

The distillery, which was commonly known as “Old Number Five” due to the fact that it was registered distillery number five and was located in the fifth tax district, quickly saw its production increase under Nelson's leadership, eventually becoming the largest producer of Tennessee whiskey in the county. Nelson's Green Brier Distillery's increased production capacity was due, at least in part, to the H.H. Kirk patent for improved distillation that Charles Nelson bought in 1868. Although Nelson did not own the distillery outright until 1867, his whiskey was trademarked in 1860, making it one of the oldest trademarked liquors in the United States. The popularity of the brand, “Nelson’s Green Brier Tennessee Whiskey” was growing at such a rapid rate, that by 1885, the distillery was producing 380,000 gallons of whiskey per year, making it the largest producer in Robertson County. In comparison, the annual production capacity of Jack Daniel's distillery in Lynchburg, Tennessee was 23,000 gallons. Charles Nelson was also on the forefront of marketing and advertising at the time, giving away sets of calendars with pictures of beautiful women, originally painted by artists such as Henri Rondel, G.T. Collins, and Angelo Asti (known as one of the fathers of pin-up art), to promote his brand.

Nelson was also highly involved in ventures outside of distilling whiskey, such as music, banking and rail.. In fact, Nelson's Green Brier Distillery was the primary reason that the small town of Greenbrier had a rail station built in order to transport ingredients and products to and from the distillery. He was also one of the founders of both the Nashville Trust Company and the Nashville Musical Union, and the first president of each of those organizations. Nelson was president of the Nashville Trust Company.

== Personal life ==
Nelson married. He had two sons and three daughters. Nelson's first son, Charles Nelson Jr. was the result of his first marriage, which was short-lived due to the death of his wife. He married his second wife, Louisa Rohlfing on March 4, 1863, and except for a brief stint in Cincinnati, Ohio, the Nelsons resided in Nashville. His second marriage produced two sons and three daughters (William, Henry, Emma, Alice, and Louise), all of whom were college educated; the boys at Harvard University and the girls at Vassar College.

Nelson died on December 13, 1891, aged 57, in Nashville. He was buried in Mount Olivet Cemetery. According to his obituary, at the time of his death, his estate was valued at more than US$1,000,000 (equivalent to $34,996,296 in 2024).
