= Mats Facklam =

German footballer

Personal information
- Date of birth: 22 August 1996 (age 30)
- Place of birth: Hamburg, Germany
- Height: 1.96 m (6 ft 5 in)
- Position: Forward

Team information
- Current team: VfB Oldenburg
- Number: 29

Youth career
- FG Stormarn 2000
- SV Eichede
- –2011: Concordia Hamburg
- 2011–2014: SV Eichede

Senior career*
Years	Team	Apps	(Gls)
2014–2015	SV Eichede II	25	(24)
2015–2018	SV Eichede	55	(26)
2018	Sportfreunde Lotte	10	(0)
2018–2019	Eintracht Norderstedt	23	(3)
2019–2020	Holstein Kiel II	12	(3)
2020–2021	SV Eichede	5	(5)
2021–2022	FC Teutonia Ottensen	28	(15)
2022–2024	VfB Lübeck	30	(6)
2024	Greifswalder FC	5	(0)
2025	Sportfreunde Lotte	11	(1)
2025–	VfB Oldenburg	44	(37)
- * Club domestic league appearances and goals as of 22 September 2026

Mats Facklam (born 22 August 1996) is a German footballer who plays as a forward for VfB Oldenburg.
