= TuS Celle FC =

German football club

TuS Celle
- Full name: Turn- und Sportverein Celle FC
- Founded: 23 August 1945
- Ground: Günther-Volker-Stadion
- Capacity: 11,000
- League: Kreisliga Celle
- 2021–22: Kreisliga Celle, 4th of 8
Home colours	Away colours

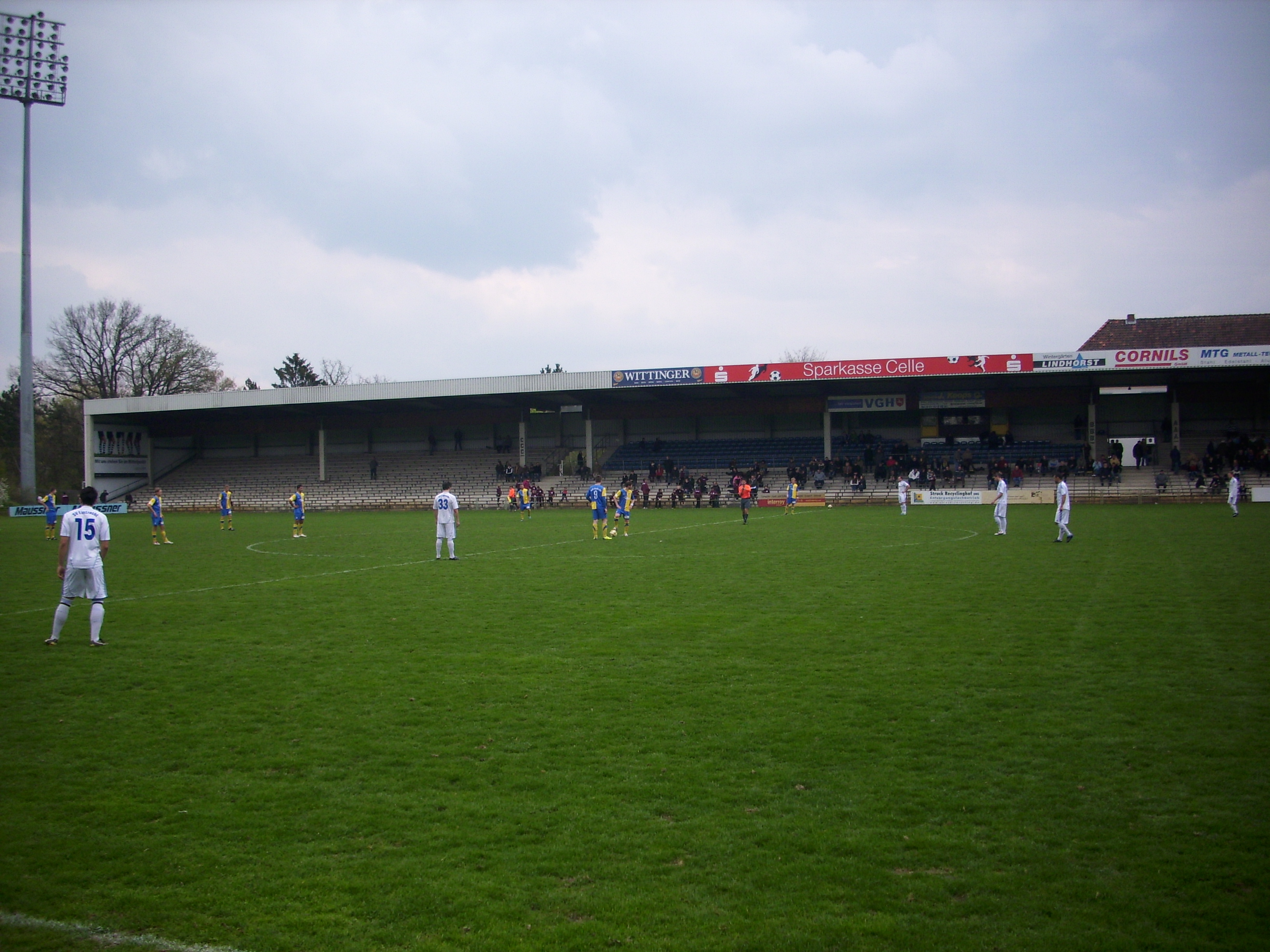
Günther-Volker-Stadion

TuS Celle FC is a football club based in Celle, Lower Saxony, Germany. They are currently members of the Kreisliga Celle and play at the Günther-Volker-Stadion.

== History ==
The club was established on 23 August 1945 through the merger of SpVgg Celle 1921, which, like sports and football clubs across the country, was dissolved by occupying Allied authorities following World War II as part of the process of denazification, and the worker's club Freie Turnschaft Celle, established in 1899, and shut down under the Nazis in 1933 like other left-leaning or faith-based clubs as politically undesirable.

From 1949 until 1962, the club played in the Amateurliga Niedersachsen-Ost (III), before switching to the western division. In 1964, the two leagues were unified as the Amateurliga Niedersachsen, then the third tier. They were promoted to the Regionalliga Nord (II) in 1968. They finished 15th, one place clear of relegation in their first season, but consolidated to finish eleventh and then tenth twice between 1970 and 1972. However, in the 1972–73 season they finished 17th, and were relegated back to the Amateurliga. In 1980–81 they won the division, but were not promoted as they lost in the play-offs.

After winning the Verbandsliga again (the renamed Amateurliga) in 1990, the club was promoted to the Oberliga Nord (IV). In 1992, the footballers became independent of parent club TuS Celle, and added the suffix FC to distinguish themselves.

When the Regionalliga Nord (III) was re-established in 1994, TuS were amongst the founder clubs. They finished third in 1995–96, and twice finished sixth. In 1996, the club recorded its record attendance of 13,500 for a game against Bayern Munich. When the Regionalligen were reduced from four to two in 2000, TuS were relegated to the Oberliga Niedersachsen/Bremen. They were relegated again to the Verbandsliga in 2002 after finishing bottom of the division. They were relegated again to the Landesliga Lüneburg at the end of the 2002–03 season, but made an immediate return to the Verbandsliga the following season by winning the Landesliga.

In 2008 the Verbandsliga was renamed the Oberliga Niedersachsen. In 2008–09 the club was relegated from Oberliga Niedersachsen Ost to the Bezirksoberliga Lüneburg. The following season the club were relegated again, this time to the Bezirksliga Lüneburg 2. In 2010–11 they finished second in the Bezirksliga, and were promoted back to the newly renamed Landesliga Lüneburg. The club was promoted again at the end of the 2011–12 season after finishing third, reaching the Niedersachsenliga. They finished in the relegation zone in 2012–13, but avoided being relegated after TuS Heeslingen had their Oberliga licence revoked and SV Holthausen/Biene resigned from the league. However, at the end of the 2013–14 season TuS were relegated back to the Landesliga Lüneburg after finishing bottom of the Niedersachsenliga. They were relegated again at the end of the 2015–16 season, dropping into the Bezirksliga Lüneburg, and then again at the end of the 2017–18 season when they dropped to the Kreisliga Celle.

== Honours ==
- Verbandsliga Niedersachsen
  - Champions 1980–81, 1989–90
- Landesliga Lüneburg
  - Champions 2003–04
- Lower Saxony Cup
  - Winners 1980–81

== See also ==
- TuS Celle FC players
