= Landesliga Lüneburg =

- Founded: 1979
- Country: Germany
- State: Lower Saxony
- Number of clubs: 18
- Level on pyramid: Level 6
- Promotion to: Oberliga Niedersachsen
- Relegation to: Bezirksliga Lüneburg 1-4
- Current champions: SV Ahlerstedt/Ottendorf (2021–22)

The Landesliga Lüneburg, called the Bezirksoberliga Lüneburg from 1979 to 1994 and 2006 to 2010, is the sixth tier of the German football league system and the second highest league in the German state of Lower Saxony (German:Niedersachsen). It covers the region of the now defunct Regierungsbezirk Lüneburg.

It is one of four leagues at this level in Lower Saxony, the other three being the Landesliga Braunschweig, the Landesliga Weser-Ems and the Landesliga Hannover.

The term Landesliga can be translated as State league.

== Overview ==
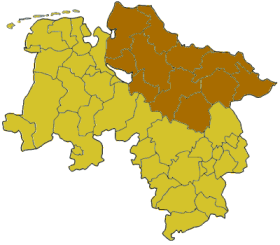
Map of Lower Saxony:Position of the Lüneburg region highlighted

The league's history goes back to 1979, when four new Bezirksoberligas (Braunschweig, Hannover, Lüneburg and Weser-Ems) were formed in the state of Lower Saxony. The Bezirksoberligas (6th tier) were set below the Verbandsliga Niedersachsen (4th tier) and the two Landesligas (5th tier) in the German football league system. In 1994, the two old Landesligas were dissolved, while the four Bezirksoberligas were renamed into Landesliga Braunschweig, Landesliga Hannover, Landesliga Lüneburg, and Landesliga Weser-Ems respectively. Due to the introduction of the new Regionalliga (IV) the new Landesligas still remained at the 6th tier of German football, however.

In 2006, the Landesliga was renamed into Bezirksoberliga again. The new Bezirksoberliga Lüneburg was made up of seventeen clubs, one from the Verbandsliga Niedersachsen-Ost, eleven from the Landesliga and five from the two Bezirksligas. The league was formed in a reorganisation of the league system in Lower Saxony, whereby the four regional Landsligas were replaced by the Bezirksoberligas. Below these, the number of Bezirksligas was increased. In Lüneburg, the two Bezirksligas were expanded to four, as in the other regions, except Weser-Ems, which was expanded to five.

The Bezirksoberliga, like the Landesliga before, was set in the league system below the Verbandsliga and above the now four Bezirksligas, which were numbered from one to four. The winner of the Bezirksoberliga was directly promoted to the Verbandsliga, while the bottom placed teams, in a varying number, were relegated to the Bezirksliga. The Bezirksoberligas of Weser-Ems and Hanover form the tier below the Verbandsliga West, while those of Lüneburg and Braunschweig form the tier below the eastern division of the Verbandsliga.

In the leagues first season, 2006–07, the runners-up of the league, Rot-Weiß Cuxhaven, was also promoted, like the runners-up from Braunschweig. In the following season, only the league champions were promoted while, in 2009, the Rot-Weiß Cuxhaven moved up a level as runners-up once more.

At the end of the 2007-08 season, with the introduction of the 3. Liga, the Verbandsliga was renamed Oberliga Niedersachsen-Ost. For the Bezirksoberliga, this had no direct consequences.

After the 2009-10 season, the two Oberligas (English: Premier league) in Lower Saxony were merged to one single division. The four Bezirksoberliga champions that season were not automatically promoted, instead they had to compete with the four teams placed ninth and tenth in the Oberliga for four more spots in this league.

On 17 May 2010, the Lower Saxony football association decided to rename the four Bezirksoberligas to Landesligas from 1 July 2010. This change in name came alongside the merger of the two Oberliga divisions above it into the Oberliga Niedersachsen.

== Champions ==
=== Bezirksoberliga Lüneburg 1979–1994 ===
- 1980: TSV Wietze
- 1981: SG Bomlitz-Lönsheide
- 1982: SV Eintracht Lüneburg
- 1983: SC Uelzen 09
- 1984: TSV Verden
- 1985: TuSG Ritterhude
- 1986: SV Eintracht Lüneburg
- 1987: Cuxhavener SV
- 1988: SV Ahlerstedt/Ottendorf
- 1989: TuS Neetze
- 1990: SV Drochtersen/Assel
- 1991: TuS Heeslingen
- 1992: SV Soltau
- 1993: TuS Güldenstern Stade
- 1994: MTV Soltau

=== Landesliga Lüneburg 1994–2006 ===
- 1995: Rotenburger SV
- 1996: TSV Wendezelle
- 1997: TSV Siewern
- 1998: MTV Soltau
- 1999: Blau-Weiß Bornreihe
- 2000: Teutonia Uelzen
- 2001: Lüneburger SK II
- 2002: TSV Neuenkirchen
- 2003: VSK Osterholz-Scharmbeck
- 2004: TuS Celle FC
- 2005: VfL Maschen
- 2006: Blau-Weiß Bornreihe

=== Bezirksoberliga Lüneburg 2006–2010 ===
Season	Champions	Runners-up	Third
2006–07	**Rotenburger SV**	**Rot-Weiß Cuxhaven**	Teutonia Uelzen
2007–08	**TSV Ottersberg**	SV Eintracht Lüneburg	Teutonia Uelzen
2008–09	**SV Ahlerstedt/Ottendorf**	**Rot-Weiß Cuxhaven**	VfL Stade
2009–10	**Teutonia Uelzen**	SV Rot-Weiss Köhlen	VfL Stade

=== Landesliga Lüneburg 2010–present ===
Season	Champions	Runners-up	Third
2010–11	**Rotenburger SV**	Blau-Weiß Bornreihe	SV Ahlerstedt/Ottendorf
2011–12	**SV Drochtersen/Assel**	TB Uphusen	**TuS Celle FC**
2012–13	**TB Uphusen**	Teutonia Uelzen	MTV Treubund Lüneburg
2013–14	**Teutonia Uelzen**	Heeslinger SC	FC Eintracht Cuxhaven
2014–15	**Heeslinger SC**	MTV Treubund Lüneburg	FC Hagen/Uthlede
2015–16	**Blau-Weiß Bornreihe**	FC Hagen/Uthlede	MTV Eintracht Celle
2016–17	**MTV Eintracht Celle**	TuS Harsefeld	FC Hagen/Uthlede
2017–18	**FC Hagen/Uthlede**	MTV Treubund Lüneburg	Blau-Weiß Bornreihe
2018–19	**MTV Eintracht Celle**	TuS Harsefeld	SV Ahlerstedt/Ottendorf
2019–20	**Rotenburger SV**	MTV Treubund Lüneburg	TuS Harsefeld
2020–21	Season curtailed and annulled by COVID-19 pandemic in Germany		
2021–22	**SV Ahlerstedt/Ottendorf**	FC Verden 04	Blau-Weiß Borneihe
2022-23	**Blau-Weiß Bornreihe**	FC Verden 04	TuS Harsefeld
2023-24	**FC Verden 04**	Lüneburger SK Hansa	SV Lindwedel-Hope
2024-25	**Lüneburger SK Hansa**	SV Ahlerstedt/Ottendorf	SV Drochtersen-Assel II

- Promoted teams in **bold**.
