= Davidson Eden =

Ghanaian footballer (born 1988)

Personal information
- Birth name: Davidson Drobo-Ampem
- Date of birth: 26 March 1988 (age 38)
- Place of birth: Accra, Ghana
- Height: 1.89 m (6 ft 2 in)
- Position: Centre back

Team information
- Current team: Teutonia Ottensen
- Number: 17

Youth career
- –2005: SC Hamm 02
- 2005–2006: SC Vorwärts/Wacker
- 2006–2008: FC St. Pauli

Senior career*
Years	Team	Apps	(Gls)
2009–2011	FC St. Pauli II	75	(5)
2009–2012	FC St. Pauli	16	(0)
2011–2012	→ Esbjerg (loan)	16	(1)
2012–2014	Esbjerg	27	(0)
2014–2015	FC Wacker Innsbruck	7	(0)
2015–2016	FC St. Pauli II	24	(0)
2016	FC St. Pauli	2	(0)
2016	Hobro IK	5	(0)
2017–2018	Lüneburger SK Hansa	23	(0)
2018–2022	Teutonia Ottensen	76	(9)
2022–2023	Hamm United	45	(1)
2024	FC Alsterbrüder	14	(0)
2024–	Teutonia Ottensen	4	(0)
- * Club domestic league appearances and goals as of 1 January 2025

Davidson "Dave" Eden (born 26 March 1988) is a Ghanaian footballer who plays as a centre back for Regionalliga Nord club Teutonia Ottensen. Until 2015, his surname was Drobo-Ampem.

== Career ==
Eden played in the youth for SC Hamm 02 and signed in 2005 for SC Vorwärts/Wacker 04. In the 2006–07 season he moved to the youth side of FC St. Pauli.

Eden made his debut on the professional league level in the 2. Bundesliga for FC St. Pauli on 13 February 2009 when he came on as a substitute in the 24th minute in a game against Rot-Weiß Oberhausen. He started in the next game against 1. FC Kaiserslautern.

On 31 January 2011, he went on loan to Esbjerg fB until the end of the season. After returning to Hamburg in summer he did not play in any league matches and on 31 August 2011 he joined Esbjerg again on another loan deal. On 2 July 2012, he signed a two-year deal with Esbjerg.

Two years later, on 1 September 2014 he moved to Austrian Football First League club FC Wacker Innsbruck. On 29 August 2015, he returned to FC St. Pauli, signing a one-year contract.

Eden signed with Danish 1st Division-club Hobro IK on 2 September 2016, but did not get his contract extended, so he left the club on 1 January 2017.

== Personal life ==
In October 2015, it was announced that Eden had acquired German citizenship. On this occasion he also had his surname changed from "Drobo-Ampem" to "Eden", only stating to the public that it was for "personal reasons".

== Honours ==
Esbjerg

- Danish Cup: 2012–13
