= Nelson's Green Brier Distillery =

- U.S. National Register of Historic Places
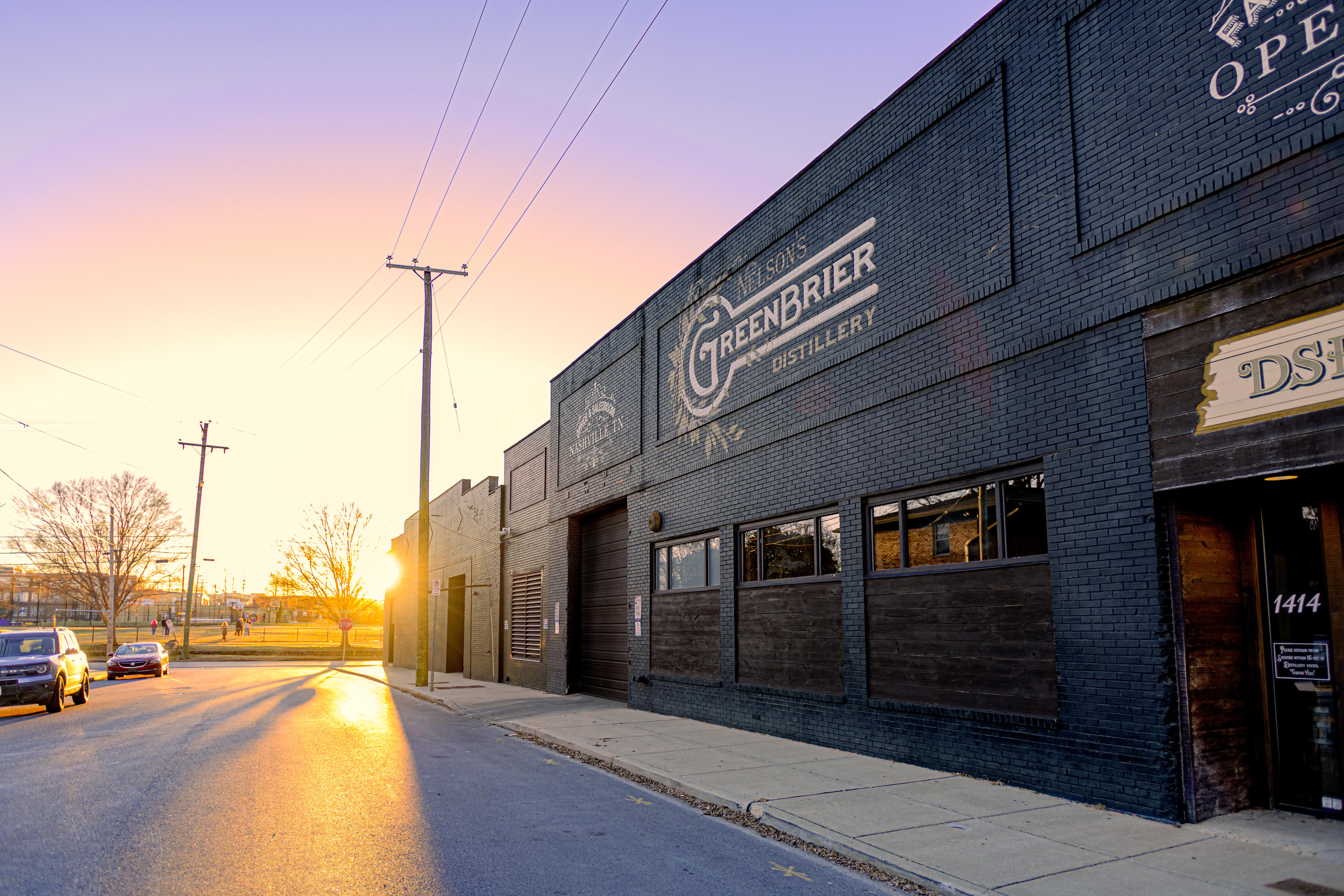
- Current distillery building
- Location: 647 Main St, Greenbrier, TN 37073
- Built: 1885
- Architectural style: Industrial
- NRHP reference No.: 08000703
- Added to NRHP: July 24, 2008

The Nelson's Greenbrier Distillery is a distillery in Nashville, Tennessee, producing Tennessee whiskey, as well as other traditional bourbon and rye whiskies. Originally operating from 1860 to 1909 in the nearby village of Greenbrier, a descendant of the original owner revived the business as a craft distillery in 2011, and sales of Tennessee Whiskey resumed in 2019.

== History ==
The original Nelson's Green Brier Distillery was located on Rocky Fork Creek in Greenbrier, Robertson County, Tennessee. It operated from 1867 until it was shut down in 1909 when Tennessee enacted state-level Prohibition of alcoholic beverages.

The distillery was acquired in 1870 by Charles Nelson, a Nashville businessman who expanded operations in the ensuing years. The whiskey produced there was sold in other parts of the United States under the label "Nelson's Best".

In 1885, the distillery produced 380,000 U.S. gallons (1,400,000 liters) of whiskey, making it the largest producer of sour mash whiskey in Robertson County during a time when whiskey production was a major industry in Tennessee and the county was one of the state's largest producers. At that time, the annual production capacity of the Jack Daniel's distillery in Lynchburg was 23,000 U.S. gallons (87,000 liters).

Nelson's Green Brier Distillery was a major contributor to the economy and growth of the town of Greenbrier (spelled as one word) during the late 19th century. It employed about 25 people directly and provided a market for local farmers' corn, locally made barrels and other local products. Its presence led to the construction of a railroad line and station in Greenbrier.

Whiskey production at the distillery ended after Tennessee enacted prohibition on July 1, 1909, but whiskey produced before that date continued to be sold in other states until 1915. Robertson County whiskey had a reputation for superior quality, but the county's whiskey industry was not revived after national Prohibition ended.

The distillery equipment was salvaged and shipped to Canada in 1923 to be used for distilling there by Seagram.

The site was added to the National Register of Historic Places in 2008. The distillery's listing on the National Register of Historic Places is due to its historical importance in industry and commerce in the state. Additionally, proprietor Charles Nelson was active in the banking, farming and barrel-making industries. The listed property includes a 5-acre (2.0 ha) area, although the distillery occupied a much larger area. Most of the distillery buildings are no longer present, and the only historical buildings remaining include an early 20th-century warehouse, a spring house that supplied fresh water to the distillery and a barrel house. The site includes a dam across Rocky Fork Creek, an old mash tub and remnants of building foundations.

== Revival of the brand ==
In 2011, two of the great-great-great-grandsons of Charles Nelson, Charlie and Andy Nelson, announced a plan to revive the Nelson's brand and produce whiskey using Charles Nelson's recipes. In 2013, they began bottling whiskey from MGP in Indiana under the label Belle Meade Bourbon, a brand name used historically by Nelson's, while they waited on the permits and equipment necessary to open their own distillery.

On November 23, 2014, the new Nelson's Green Brier Distillery opened in Nashville, featuring a factory store and gift shop, bar, tours of the facilities, and since 2023, a restaurant. Constellation Brands (through its investment branch Constellation Ventures) bought a minority stake in the company in 2016 and a majority stake in 2019. The Nelson brothers, Andy and Charlie Nelson, remain heavily involved in the business today.

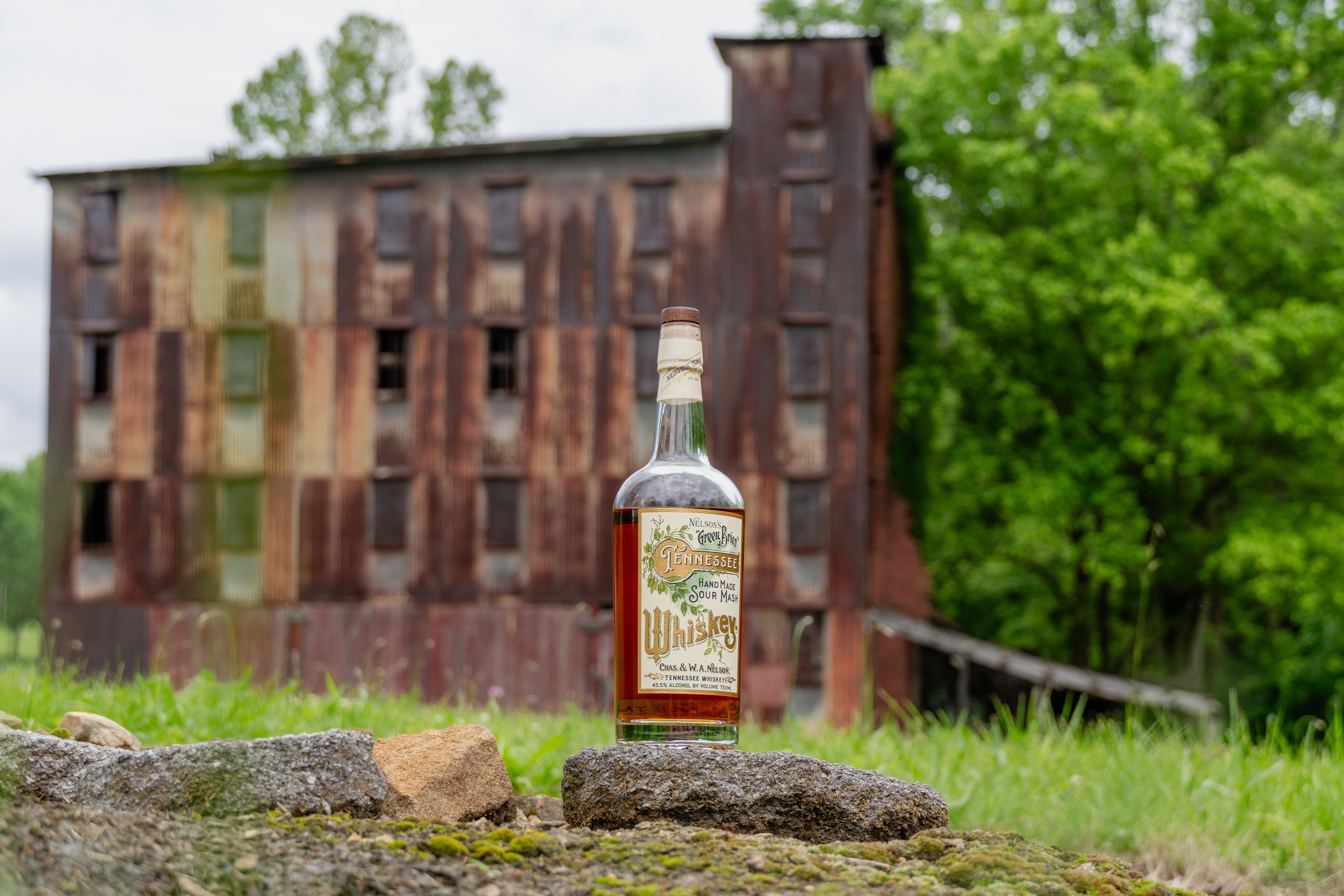
Original distillery rickhouse and a modern-day bottle

== Current product offerings ==
=== Tennessee whisky ===
==== Nelson's Greenbrier Tennessee Whisky ====
Launched in 2019, Nelson's Greenbrier Tennessee Whisky is a wheated Tennessee whiskey based on Charles Nelson's original recipe and reusing the original bottle design, making its modern-day bottling the first since 1909. Nelson's Greenbrier Tennessee Whisky is available in all 50 states and certain European countries.

- Nelson's Greenbrier Tennessee Whisky
- Nelson's Greenbrier Bottled in Bond
- Nelson's Greenbrier Cask Strength
- Nelson's Greenbrier Marathon Malt

=== Bourbons and ryes ===
The Nelson Brothers line of bourbons are high-rye mashbill whiskies created by blending bourbons sourced from Indiana and Kentucky with in-house-distilled traditional bourbon that is not put through the Lincoln County Process. The Nelson Brothers Rye is sourced from Bardstown Bourbon Company, Kentucky, whereas the Nelson's Greenbrier Rye is distilled in-house and aged for eight years.

- Nelson Bros. Classic Bourbon
- Nelson Bros. Reserve Bourbon
- Nelson Bros. Rye
- Nelson's Greenbrier Rye

=== Cask-finished bourbons ===
- Nelson Bros. Cognac Cask
- Nelson Bros. Calvados Cask
- Nelson Bros. Mourvedre Cask
- Nelson Bros. Madeira Cask
- Nelson Bros. Sherry Cask
- Nelson Bros. White Wine Cask
- Nelson Bros. Black Brier Stout Cask
- Nelson Bros. Honey Cask

=== Other spirits ===
- Schatzi Vodka
- Nelson Bros. Dry Gin
- Nelson's Greenbrier Cream Liqueur

== Previous products ==
=== Belle Meade Bourbon ===
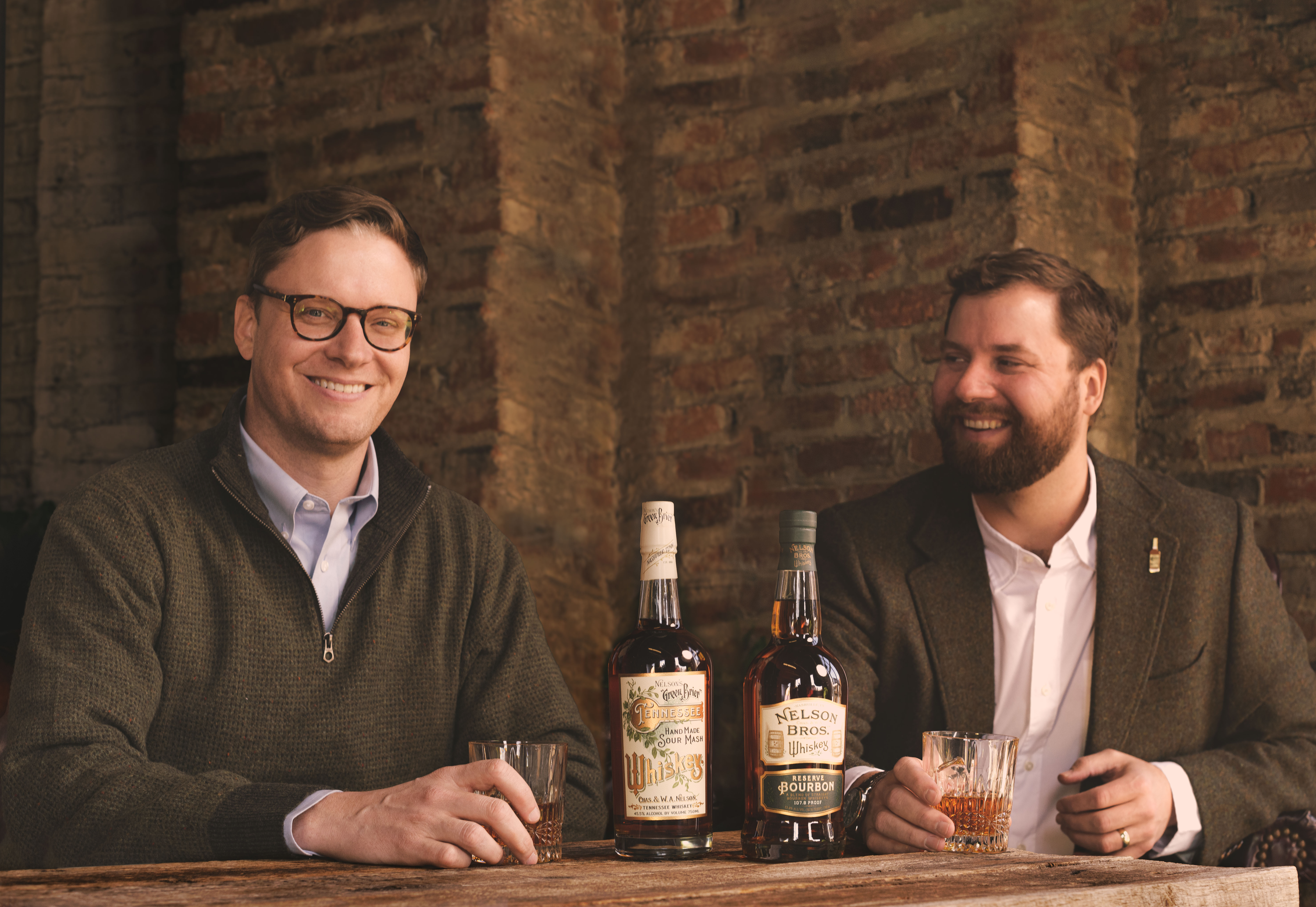
Founders Andy and Charlie Nelson

Belle Meade Bourbon was a bourbon sourced from MGP of Indiana and bottled between 2012 and 2023, including variants finished in European wine and spirit casks and barrels that previously held honey.

- Belle Meade Bourbon
- Belle Meade Sherry Cask Finish
- Belle Meade Cognac Cask Finish
- Belle Meade Madeira Cask Finish
- Belle Meade Single Barrel Bourbon

=== Nelson's First 108 Tennessee Whisky ===
A distillery-only limited release named after the total number of barrels produced and the 108-year time gap that occurred between the company's forced shutdown due to Prohibition and its revival. It was made available in a cask-strength (not diluted with water), single-barrel version and a 90-proof, small batch blend.

=== Nelson's Green Brier Tennessee White Whisky ===
An unaged version of the signature Tennessee Whisky.

== See also ==
- List of historic whisky distilleries
