= Lukas Pägelow =

German footballer

Personal information
- Date of birth: March 5, 1994 (age 32)
- Place of birth: Hagenow, Germany
- Position: Central defender

Team information
- Current team: LSK Hansa
- Number: 24

Youth career
- Rodenwalder SV
- –2008: Eintracht Schwerin
- 2008–2013: Hansa Rostock

Senior career*
Years	Team	Apps	(Gls)
2013–2015	Hansa Rostock II	35	(3)
2013–2015	Hansa Rostock	2	(0)
2015	ZFC Meuselwitz	13	(0)
2015–	LSK Hansa	138	(7)
- * Club domestic league appearances and goals as of 28 October 2020

Lukas Pägelow (born March 5, 1994) is a German professional footballer who plays as a central defender for LSK Hansa.

== Club career ==
He made his debut for Hansa Rostock in August 2013, as a substitute for Sebastian Pelzer in a 3–1 win over VfB Stuttgart II in the 3. Liga.
