= Rotenburger SV =

German football club

- Full name: Rotenburger Sportverein e.V.
- Founded: 1919; 106 years ago
- Ground: Sportanlage In der Ahe, Rotenburg an der Wümme
- Capacity: 3,000
- Chairman: Peter Grewe
- Manager: Tim Ebersbach
- League: Landesliga Lüneburg
- 2023–24: Oberliga Niedersachsen, 15th
- Website: https://www.rotenburgersv.de

Rotenburger Sportverein e.V. is a football club based in Rotenburg an der Wümme, Lower Saxony, Germany, founded in 1919.

== Stadium ==
The club plays its home matches at the Sportanlage In der Ahe, which has a capacity of 3,000. The stadium has hosted youth international matches.

== Recent seasons ==
The recent season-by-season performance of the club

| Season | Division | Tier | Position |
|---|---|---|---|
| 1994–95 | Landesliga Lüneburg | VI | 1st |
| 1997–98 | Oberliga Niedersachsen/Bremen | V | 9th |
| 1998–99 | Oberliga Niedersachsen/Bremen | V | 11th |
| 1999–2000 | Oberliga Niedersachsen/Bremen | V | 7th |
| 2000–01 | Oberliga Niedersachsen/Bremen | V | 7th |
| 2001–02 | Oberliga Niedersachsen/Bremen | V | 13th |
| 2002–03 | Oberliga Niedersachsen/Bremen | V | 13th |
| 2003–04 | Oberliga Niedersachsen/Bremen | V | 13th |
| 2004–05 | Niedersachsenliga Ost | V | 7th |
| 2005–06 | Niedersachsenliga Ost | V | 16th ↓ |
| 2006–07 | Bezirksoberliga Lüneburg | VI | 1st ↑ |
| 2007–08 | Niedersachsenliga Ost | V | 10th |
| 2008–09 | Oberliga Niedersachsen-Ost | V | 16th ↓ |
| 2009–10 | Bezirksoberliga Lüneburg | VI | 7th |
| 2010–11 | Landesliga Lüneburg | VI | 1st ↑ |
| 2011–12 | Oberliga Niedersachsen | V | 16th |
| 2012–13 | Oberliga Niedersachsen | V | 13th |
| 2013–14 | Oberliga Niedersachsen | V | 13th |
| 2014–15 | Oberliga Niedersachsen | V | 15th ↓ |
| 2015–16 | Landesliga Lüneburg | VI | 4th |
| 2016–17 | Landesliga Lüneburg | VI | 12th |
| 2017–18 | Landesliga Lüneburg | VI | 5th |
| 2018–19 | Landesliga Lüneburg | VI | 5th |
| 2019–20 | Landesliga Lüneburg | VI | 1st ↑ |
| 2020–21 | Oberliga Niedersachsen Weser-Ems / Lüneburg | V | 7th |
| 2021–22 | Oberliga Niedersachsen Weser-Ems / Lüneburg | V | 2nd |
| 2022–23 | Oberliga Niedersachsen | V | 9th |
| 2023–24 | Oberliga Niedersachsen | V | 15th |
| 2024–25 | Landesliga Lüneburg | VI | |

- With the introduction of the Regionalligas in 1994 and the 3. Liga in 2008 as the new third tier, below the 2. Bundesliga, all leagues below dropped one tier.

| ↑ Promoted | ↓ Relegated |
