= 2014–15 Niedersachsenliga =

- Season: 2014–15
- Champions: SV Drochtersen/Assel
- Promoted: SV Drochtersen/Assel VfV 06 Hildesheim
- Relegated: TSV Ottersberg Rotenburger SV: 1. SC Göttingen 05
- Matches: 240
- Top goalscorer: Sascha Wald (24 goals)
- Total attendance: 67,891
- Average attendance: 283
- All statistics correct as of 19 May 2016.

The 2014–15 season of the Niedersachsenliga, the highest association football league in the German state of Lower Saxony, was the seventh season of the league at tier five (V) of the German football league system.

== 2014–15 season ==
=== Standings ===
The 2014–15 season saw four new clubs in the league, Eintracht Northeim, SC Spelle-Venhaus, Arminia Hannover and Teutonia Uelzen, all four promoted from the Landesligas, while no club had been relegated from the Regionalliga Nord.

| Pos | Team | Pld | W | D | L | GF | GA | GD | Pts | Promotion, qualification or relegation |
|---|---|---|---|---|---|---|---|---|---|---|
| 1 | SV Drochtersen/Assel (C, P) | 30 | 22 | 5 | 3 | 79 | 30 | +49 | 71 | Promotion to Regionalliga Nord |
| 2 | VfV 06 Hildesheim (P) | 30 | 19 | 5 | 6 | 61 | 23 | +38 | 62 | Qualification to promotion playoffs |
| 3 | SSV Jeddeloh | 30 | 18 | 7 | 5 | 69 | 41 | +28 | 61 | |
| 4 | Germania Egestorf | 30 | 14 | 6 | 10 | 51 | 42 | +9 | 48 | |
| 5 | Eintracht Northeim | 30 | 14 | 5 | 11 | 61 | 55 | +6 | 47 | |
| 6 | SC Spelle-Venhaus | 30 | 14 | 3 | 13 | 67 | 53 | +14 | 45 | |
| 7 | Lupo-Martini Wolfsburg | 30 | 13 | 5 | 12 | 55 | 44 | +11 | 44 | |
| 8 | 1. FC Wunstorf | 30 | 13 | 5 | 12 | 56 | 51 | +5 | 44 | |
| 9 | VfL Osnabrück II (Note: Reserve teams of 3. Liga clubs are ineligible for Regionalliga promotion.) | 30 | 13 | 5 | 12 | 54 | 54 | 0 | 44 | |
| 10 | Arminia Hannover | 30 | 12 | 8 | 10 | 47 | 50 | −3 | 44 | |
| 11 | TB Uphusen | 30 | 11 | 8 | 11 | 59 | 65 | −6 | 41 | |
| 12 | Teutonia Uelzen | 30 | 11 | 4 | 15 | 39 | 49 | −10 | 37 | |
| 13 | VfL Oldenburg | 30 | 9 | 5 | 16 | 46 | 57 | −11 | 32 | |
| 14 | TSV Ottersberg (R) | 30 | 5 | 8 | 17 | 29 | 66 | −37 | 23 | Relegation to Landesliga |
| 15 | Rotenburger SV (R) | 30 | 4 | 5 | 21 | 40 | 75 | −35 | 17 | Relegation to Landesliga |
| 16 | 1. SC Göttingen 05 (R) | 30 | 4 | 4 | 22 | 32 | 90 | −58 | 16 | Relegation to Landesliga |

Source: soccerway.com
Rules for classification: 1) Points; 2) Goal difference; 3) Goals scored; 4) head-to-head results; 5) goals scored away from home against opponent; 6) goals scored away from home; 7) drawing of lots
(C) Champions; (P) Promoted; (R) Relegated

=== Results ===
| 2014–15 | LMW | OSN | GER | SVD | WUN | HIL | TBU | SSV | OTT | OLD | RSV | G05 | NOR | ARM | UEL | SCS |
|---|---|---|---|---|---|---|---|---|---|---|---|---|---|---|---|---|
| Lupo Martini Wolfsburg | | 5–2 | 0–1 | 2–5 | 3–1 | 1–3 | 4–1 | 1–2 | 1–2 | 2–0 | 3–2 | 3–0 | 0–0 | 4–0 | 3–1 | 3–1 |
| VfL Osnabrück II | 3–1 | | 3–2 | 2–5 | 2–1 | 1–1 | 1–1 | 1–2 | 3–1 | 2–0 | 5–3 | 4–1 | 2–1 | 1–2 | 3–3 | 1–3 |
| 1. FC Germania Egestorf/Langreder | 2–1 | 1–0 | | 2–1 | 1–3 | 1–1 | 2–3 | 1–0 | 0–0 | 2–0 | 3–0 | 4–2 | 0–0 | 2–2 | 0–1 | 1–4 |
| SV Drochtersen/Assel | 2–1 | 2–2 | 2–0 | | 2–1 | 1–1 | 5–0 | 3–2 | 5–0 | 3–1 | 3–0 | 0–0 | 2–1 | 2–1 | 2–1 | 1–2 |
| 1. FC Wunstorf | 2–1 | 0–2 | 1–2 | 2–2 | | 0–1 | 3–0 | 1–1 | 0–0 | 3–2 | 3–0 | 2–2 | 1–2 | 2–0 | 3–0 | 1–1 |
| VfV 06 Hildesheim | 1–1 | 0–2 | 1–0 | 1–2 | 3–0 | | 7–0 | 4–0 | 5–0 | 0–1 | 4–2 | 0–1 | 1–3 | 0–1 | 1–0 | 2–1 |
| TB Uphusen | 0–1 | 3–1 | 2–2 | 0–2 | 3–5 | 0–3 | | 2–4 | 4–0 | 1–1 | 4–4 | 4–2 | 3–3 | 4–0 | 4–1 | 0–2 |
| SSV Jeddeloh | 1–0 | 5–1 | 3–1 | 3–1 | 1–0 | 1–3 | 1–1 | | 0–0 | 2–2 | 3–1 | 3–0 | 5–0 | 4–1 | 1–1 | 4–0 |
| TSV Ottersberg | 2–3 | 2–0 | 0–3 | 0–3 | 1–4 | 0–2 | 1–3 | 0–1 | | 0–3 | 2–2 | 5–1 | 0–1 | 2–2 | 1–0 | 1–6 |
| VfL Oldenburg | 1–3 | 1–2 | 1–1 | 1–4 | 6–2 | 1–3 | 1–2 | 2–2 | 1–1 | | 2–1 | 4–1 | 0–4 | 3–2 | 1–0 | 5–1 |
| Rotenburger SV | 0–0 | 1–2 | 2–4 | 2–3 | 0–1 | 1–2 | 0–3 | 2–3 | 0–3 | 2–1 | | 1–2 | 3–3 | 2–1 | 1–1 | 0–4 |
| 1. SC Göttingen 05 | 3–3 | 1–3 | 0–4 | 0–7 | 2–3 | 1–4 | 3–0 | 1–3 | 1–1 | 0–2 | 1–5 | | 0–2 | 1–4 | 2–1 | 2–5 |
| Eintracht Northeim | 2–3 | 2–1 | 5–2 | 1–2 | 6–3 | 0–1 | 1–3 | 0–4 | 1–1 | 4–1 | 5–0 | 4–1 | | 0–3 | 2–1 | 0–3 |
| SV Arminia Hannover | 1–1 | 1–1 | 0–4 | 0–4 | 1–0 | 1–1 | 2–2 | 3–3 | 3–0 | 3–0 | 1–0 | 1–0 | 5–2 | | 0–1 | 2–2 |
| Teutonia Uelzen | 2–1 | 2–1 | 4–2 | 1–3 | 1–4 | 0–3 | 1–1 | 2–3 | 4–2 | 2–1 | 3–0 | 1–0 | 0–1 | 1–2 | | 1–0 |
| SC Spelle-Venhaus | 1–0 | 1–0 | 0–1 | 0–0 | 3–4 | 0–2 | 2–5 | 6–2 | 4–1 | 2–1 | 0–3 | 7–1 | 4–5 | 1–2 | 1–2 | |

=== Top goalscorers ===
The top goal scorers for the season:

| Rank | Player | Club | Goals |
|---|---|---|---|
| 1 | (Germany) Sascha Wald | SC Spelle-Venhaus | 24 |
| 2 | (Germany) Melvin Zimmermann | Eintracht Northeim | 23 |
| 3 | (Germany) Alexander Neumann | SV Drochtersen/Assel | 22 |
| 4 | (Germany) Julian Bennert | SSV Jeddeloh | 21 |

== Promotion play-off ==
The champions of the Bremen-Liga, Oberliga Hamburg and the Schleswig-Holstein-Liga as well as the runners-up from the Niedersachsenliga entered a play-off for two more spots in the Regionalliga Nord. Eight clubs from these four leagues applied for a Regionalliga licence. As the only club from Hamburg to apply for a licence, SC Victoria Hamburg, later declined participation only three clubs take part in the promotion round, Bremer SV, TSV Schilksee and VfV 06 Hildesheim, with the latter two promoted:

| 31 May 2015 | Bremer SV | 2–1 | VfV 06 Hildesheim | Panzenberg Stadium, Bremen |
| 14:00 | Kurkiewicz 17' Abendroth 80' (pen.) | Report | Rockahr 48' | Attendance: 912; Referee: Franz Bokop |

| 3 June 2015 | TSV Schilksee | 2–1 | Bremer SV | Jürgen-Lüthje-Arena, Kiel |
| 19:30 | Schubert 4' Nath 41' | Report | Koweschnikow 89' | Attendance: 832; Referee: Robert Schröder |

| 6 June 2015 | VfV 06 Hildesheim | 3–2 | TSV Schilksee | Friedrich-Ebert-Stadion, Hildesheim |
| 15:00 | Rockahr 20' Fahmy 31' Schlichting 87' | Report | Petrick 59' Nath 82' | Attendance: 2,598; Referee: Florian Heft |
