= Lüneburger SK Hansa =

German football club

- Full name: Lüneburger Sport-Klub; Hansa von 2008 e.V.
- Nickname: LSK
- Founded: March 1, 2008; 18 years ago
- Ground: Sportanlage VfL Lüneburg, Lüneburg
- Capacity: 4000
- President: Raphael Marquardt
- Head Coach: Tarek Gibbah
- League: Oberliga Niedersachsen (V)
- 2025–26: Oberliga Niedersachsen, 6th of 16
- Website: lsk-hansa.de
Home colours	Away colours

Lüneburger SK Hansa is a football club from the Lower Saxon Hanseatic town of Lüneburg in Northern Germany. The club was founded in spring 2008 as part of the planned merger of the football divisions of the two sports clubs Lüneburger SK and Lüneburger SV.

== History ==
The former Oberliga team, Lüneburger SK, got into financial difficulties after its relegation from Regional League North (Regionalliga Nord) in 2001, which eventually led in 2002 to the initiation of insolvency proceedings. To resolve the club's debts, its president, Manfred Harder, looked for suitable partners. After three months of negotiations, he announced in early 2008 with the committee of the district league team, Lüneburger SV, the foundation of a new club, FC Hansa Lüneburg.

In the 2008/09 season, the new club merged the football divisions of both clubs fully. FC Hansa Lüneburg took over the position held by Lüneburger SK in the Lower Saxony League (Niedersachsenliga) and its right to participate in the first main round of the 2008–09 DFB-Pokal, playing VfB Stuttgart (result 0–5). In the Lower Saxony League, the club achieved 4th place in its first season.

In the 2013/14 season of the Niedersachsenliga, Lüneburg SK Hansa was the champion and have thus played since the 2014/15 season again in the 4th league, the Regionalliga Nord (4th league).

In the 2017/18 season, LSK again played in the DFB-Pokal, as runner-up of the Niedersachsenpokal. The club was beaten in the first main round, with a 1–3 defeat against Bundesliga side Mainz 05, however, midfielder Felix Vobejda scored the first goal for the club in the cup's history.

From 2014/15 until 2021/22, LSK played in the Regionalliga Nord (4th tier). After the 2021/22 season, they were relegated to the Oberliga Niedersachsen (5th tier) and in 2022/23 they were relegated again to the Landesliga Lüneburg (6th tier). In 2023/24, LSK finished 2nd. In 2024/25, they finished 1st and were promoted back to the Oberliga Niedersachsen, where they are playing now.

The first team has been using the Heinrich-Langeloh-Platz (shared with TSV Bardowick) since 2014, after Wilschenbruch stadium was demolished following its sale to make way for new residential homes. They then briefly relocated to VfL Lüneburg, then TuS Neetze and then again to VfL Lüneburg. Their current stadium is the Sports facility of VfL Lüneburg.

== Players ==
=== Current Players ===
As of 17 January 2026

Note: Flags indicate national team as defined under FIFA eligibility rules; some limited exceptions apply. Players may hold more than one non-FIFA nationality.

No.	Pos.	Nation	Player
3	DF	GER	Oke Wilke
4	DF	GER	Tom Muhlack (Team council)
5	FW	GER	Paul Knacke
6	MF	GER	Nick Tappe
7	DF	GER	Nico Hübner (3rd captain)
8	DF	GER	Stefan Wolk (2nd captain)
9	FW	GER	Samir Rabbi
10	MF	GER	Marian Kunze (captain)
13	MF	SRI	Leon Perera
14	DF	GER	Anton Beer
16	DF	BRA	Wilson Pinto Coelho

No.	Pos.	Nation	Player
17	FW	GER	Malte Meyer
19	DF	GER	Raphael Thinius
20	FW	GER	Tjark Dörr
21	FW	GER	Jona Prigge
22	GK	GER	Arne Exner
22	MF	GER	Lasse Schmidt
24	MF	GER	Max Ratzeburg
26	GK	GER	Bennet Rotetzki
28	MF	GER	Tomek Pauer (Team council)
55	MF	BRA	William Monteiro
80	MF	GER	Bo Weishaupt

=== Past Players ===
==== 2018 ====
As of 13 February 2018

Note: Flags indicate national team as defined under FIFA eligibility rules; some limited exceptions apply. Players may hold more than one non-FIFA nationality.

No.	Pos.	Nation	Player
1	GK	GER	Maximilian Wulf
3	DF	GER	Leon Deichmann
4	DF	JPN	Goson Sakai
6	MF	CPV	Ridel Monteiro
8	MF	GER	Tomek Pauer
9	DF	POR	Eudel Monteiro
10	FW	GER	Marian Kunze
11	FW	GER	Niclas Treu
14	FW	NGA	Christian Eneremadu
17	MF	GER	Lorenz Lahmann-Lammert
18	DF	GER	Linus Büchler
19	FW	GER	Kevin Krottke

No.	Pos.	Nation	Player
20	MF	GER	Felix Vobejda
21	MF	GER	Hennik Steinke
22	DF	ARM	Erjanik Ghubasaryan
24	DF	GER	Lukas Pägelow
25	GK	GER	Ole Springer
27	MF	GER	Marvin Kehl
30	GK	GER	Jannik Reichel
31	MF	GER	Stefan Wolk
32	FW	GER	Onur Capin
37	DF	GHA	Davidson Eden
77	FW	POL	Dominik Böttcher

== Personnel ==
Position	Staff
Head coach	(Germany) Tarek Gibbah
Assistant coach	(Germany) Tarek Mencke
Goalkeeping coach	(Germany) Torben Puttfarken
Strength and conditioning coach	(Germany) Frédéric Klauke
Team doctor	(Germany) Dr. Daniel Becker
Physiotherapist	(Germany) Shaurihan Savunthararajan (Germany) Geertje Kuke
Team manager	(Germany) Dennis Röhl
Team coordinator	(Germany) Horst Emonds (Germany) Achim Bartels

Last updated: 18 January 2026
Source: LSK Hansa official website

== Honours ==
The club's honours:

- League:
  - Oberliga Niedersachsen
    - Champions: 2013/14
  - Landesliga Lüneburg
    - Champions: 2024/25
    - Runners-up: 2023/24
- Cup:
  - Niedersachsenpokal
    - Runners-up: 2016/17

== Name ==
Then team manager, Christos Dovas, and the then president of Lüneburger SK, Manfred Harder, chose the name of the newly founded football club, FC Hansa Lüneburg. The name was supposed to reflect Lüneburg's past as a member of the Hanseatic League – since 2007 Lüneburg has once again been officially recognised as a Hanseatic town. After the first critical comments about the club name were made, especially its similarity to the name of F.C. Hansa Rostock, in February 2008 a local paper, Landeszeitung für die Lüneburger Heide, ran a poll in which over 700 readers took part. 59% voted against the name FC Hansa, 33% for and 8% had no view either way.

On 1 July 2011, the club was officially renamed Lüneburger SK Hansa.
