= VfV 06 Hildesheim =

German football club

- Full name: Verein für Volkssport Borussia von 1906 e. V. Hildesheim
- Founded: 1 July 2003; 23 years ago
- Ground: Friedrich-Ebert-Stadion
- Capacity: 8,000
- Chairman: Christoph Gerke
- Manager: Benjamin Duda
- League: Oberliga Niedersachsen (V)
- 2025–26: Oberliga Niedersachsen, 4th of 16
- Website: http://www.vfv06.de
Home colours	Away colours

VfV 06 Hildesheim is a German association football club from the town of Hildesheim, Lower Saxony. The club's greatest success has been promotion to the tier four Regionalliga Nord in 2015.

== History ==
=== Predecessor clubs ===
VfV 06 Hildesheim was formed on 1 July 2003 in a merger of the football department of VfV Hildesheim and Borussia 06 Hildesheim.

Of the two merger clubs, VfV Hildesheim, formed in 1945, was the more successful of the two. It had played, on a number of occasions at the highest level of football in the region. The club played in the tier one Oberliga Nord from 1958 to 1963, after which the league was disbanded in favour of the Bundesliga. VfV's best season came in 1961–62 when it finished third in the league, behind Hamburger SV and Werder Bremen. It qualified for the 1962–63 Intertoto Cup but finished last in its group, its only win coming against Blauw-Wit Amsterdam. In this era, the club also qualified for the DFB-Pokal twice, in 1960–61 and 1961–62, advancing to the quarter finals in the latter, where the club was knocked out after an 11–0 defeat by 1. FC Nürnberg. After 1963 the club gradually declined. It played in the tier two Regionalliga Nord for four more seasons between 1963 and 1967, finishing in the bottom third of the table each year. After dropping back to the tier three Amateurliga Niedersachsen the club finished runners-up in 1968 but was relegated from this level, too, the season after. The club made another DFB-Pokal appearance in 1977–78, advancing to the third round where it lost 6–0 to Hamburger SV. After almost two decades in lower amateur football the club returned to the highest league in Lower Saxony, now the tier four Verbandsliga Niedersachsen in 1987. Playing as a lower table side the club missed an opportunity to return to Oberliga level in 1994 when the Regionalligas were reintroduced, finishing sixteenth when the top fourteen moved up. VfV instead was grouped in the western division of the now split Verbandsliga and achieved much better results at this level, culminating in a league championship in the season before the merger, 2001–02. It thereby won promotion to the Oberliga Niedersachsen/Bremen where it came twelfth in 2002–03.

Borussia 06 Hildesheim, formed in 1946, never played above the Amateurliga Niedersachsen, which it belonged to from 1952 to 1960 and 1961 to 1963. Until 1958 it shared this league with VfV, when the latter was promoted to the Oberliga. From the early 1960s onwards the club's results declined and, by the time of the merger, it had dropped into local amateur football in the form of the Kreisliga Hildesheim.

Both clubs, also only formed after the Second World War, trace their origins back to earlier clubs. Borussia's line dates back to the FC Hildesheim (later merged into RSV 06 Hildesheim), formed in 1906 while VfV's roots origin in the football club Britania, formed in 1904 and later merged into Hildesheim 07.

=== VfV 06 Hildesheim ===
The new club did not start well, suffering relegation from the Oberliga in its first season, 2003–04. It played in the western division of the Verbandsliga for the next four seasons, finishing in the top half of the table each year. In 2008, alongside the introduction of the 3. Liga, the Oberliga Nord was disbanded and the Verbandsligas in Lower Saxony received Oberliga status, thereby remaining on the fifth tier of the league system. VfV played a season in the western division, followed by a season in the eastern. An eight place finish in 2009–10 was enough for the club to qualify for the now unified Oberliga Niedersachsen, commonly referred to as Niedersachsenliga. VfV's results in this league varied, coming fifth in 2011 and twelfth in 2012. A runners-up finish in the league in 2014–15 qualified the club for the promotion round to the Regionalliga Nord where it successfully competed with Bremer SV and TSV Schilksee and won promotion.

== Current squad ==
As of 7 November 2019

Note: Flags indicate national team as defined under FIFA eligibility rules; some limited exceptions apply. Players may hold more than one non-FIFA nationality.

No.	Pos.	Nation	Player
1	GK	GER	Tobias Dahncke
2	DF	GER	Niklas Rauch
3	DF	GER	Gabriel-Jerome Michalek
4	DF	GER	Jared Kambamba
5	DF	GER	Anton Pourfard
6	MF	IRQ	Karsan Dorski
7	MF	GHA	Fred Mensah
8	MF	TUR	Erhan Yilmaz
10	MF	MKD	Jane Zlatkov
15	DF	GER	Damion Sura
17	MF	GER	Nikos Elfert
19	FW	LBN	Hady El-Saleh

No.	Pos.	Nation	Player
18	MF	GER	Cedric Jahnel
19	FW	LBN	Hady El Saleh
21	MF	GER	Samuel Owusu
22	GK	GER	Tommy Henze
23	MF	LBN	Hassan El-Saleh
28	FW	TUR	Can Gökdemir
29	FW	GER	Finn-Louis Kiszka
30	DF	GER	Janis Pläschke
33	MF	GER	Yannik Schulze
37	MF	LBN	Mahdy El-Saleh
39	DF	GER	Cedric Heidenreich
66	MF	TUR	Yusuf Akdas
77	DF	LBN	Mohammad Baghdadi

== Honours ==
The club's honours:

- Niedersachsenliga
  - Runners-up: 2015

== Seasons ==
The recent season-by-season performance of the club:

Season	Division	Tier	Position
2003–04	Oberliga Niedersachsen/Bremen	IV	15th ↓
2004–05	Verbandsliga Niedersachsen-West	V	7th
2005–06	Verbandsliga Niedersachsen-West	V	5th
2006–07	Verbandsliga Niedersachsen-West	V	6th
2007–08	Verbandsliga Niedersachsen-West	V	6th
2008–09	Oberliga Niedersachsen-West	V	13th
2009–10	Oberliga Niedersachsen-Ost	V	8th
2010–11	Niedersachsenliga	V	5th
2011–12	Niedersachsenliga	V	12th
2012–13	Niedersachsenliga	V	10th
2013–14	Niedersachsenliga	V	8th
2014–15	Niedersachsenliga	V	2nd ↑
2015–16	Regionalliga Nord	IV	10th
2016–17	Regionalliga Nord	IV	15th
2017–18	Regionalliga Nord	IV	16th ↓

- With the introduction of the Regionalligas in 1994 and the 3. Liga in 2008 as the new third tier, below the 2. Bundesliga, all leagues below dropped one tier.

↑ Promoted	↓ Relegated
