= Kevin Weidlich =

German-Ghanaian footballer (born 1989)

Personal information
- Full name: Kevin-Okyere Weidlich
- Date of birth: 4 October 1989 (age 37)
- Place of birth: Hamburg, West Germany
- Height: 1.84 m (6 ft 0 in)
- Positions: Defensive midfielder; centre-back; right back

Team information
- Current team: Teutonia 05
- Number: 7

Youth career
- 1994–2000: SC Urania Hamburg
- 2000–2002: Concordia Hamburg
- 2002–2004: FC St. Pauli
- 2004–2005: SV Nettelnburg/Allermöhe
- 2005–2007: Altona 93

Senior career*
Years	Team	Apps	(Gls)
2007–2008	VfL 93 Hamburg	8	(1)
2008–2010	USC Paloma	56	(14)
2010–2011	FC Sylt	21	(3)
2011–2012	FC St. Pauli II	28	(2)
2012–2013	TSG Neustrelitz	23	(2)
2014–2015	TSG Neustrelitz	38	(10)
2015–2016	BFC Dynamo	28	(3)
2016–2019	Energie Cottbus	98	(13)
2020	Fortuna Köln	4	(0)
2021–	Teutonia Ottensen	83	(14)
- * Club domestic league appearances and goals as of 1 January 2025

Kevin-Okyere Weidlich (born 4 October 1989) is a German-Ghanaian footballer who plays as a midfielder or defender for FC Teutonia Ottensen.
