= SV Drochtersen/Assel =

German football club

- Full name: Spielervereinigung Drochtersen/Assel e.V.
- Founded: 19 April 1977
- Ground: Kehdinger Stadion
- Capacity: 2,500
- Chairman: Rigo Gooßen
- Manager: Oliver Ioannou
- League: Regionalliga Nord (IV)
- 2025–26: Regionalliga Nord, 2nd of 18
- Website: http://www.sv-drochtersen-assel.com
Home colours	Away colours

SV Drochtersen/Assel is a German association football club from the municipality of Drochtersen, Lower Saxony. The club's greatest success has been promotion to the tier four Regionalliga Nord in 2015 after winning the Niedersachsenliga.

== History ==
The club was formed in 1977 in a merger of the football departments of two local clubs, VTV Assel and TVG Drochtersen. First, unsuccessful attempts to combine the two had already been made three years earlier but were voted down by the members of VTV. It took until 1985 to see the new club having some success when it won promotion to the Bezirksliga. From there the club rose to the Bezirksoberliga Lüneburg, now the Landesliga, in 1987. After an era of success the club declined again in the late 1990s, suffering relegation down to the Bezirksliga in 1997. In 2001 the club returned to what was now the Landesliga Lüneburg.

A runners-up finish in the Landesliga in 2004–05 took SV Drochtersen/Assel up to the tier five Verbandsliga Niedersachsen-Ost where it played as a lower table side for the next three seasons. In 2008, with the disbanding of the Oberliga Nord, the league was renamed to Oberliga Niedersachsen-Ost. Drochtersen/Assel achieved two upper table finishes in the league in the next two seasons. A seventh place in 2009–10 qualified the club for the now single division Oberliga but a 17th place in 2010–11 meant it had to drop down to the Landesliga again.

Winning a championship in the Landesliga Lüneburg in 2011–12 took the club back up to the Niedersachsenliga. After three seasons at this level the club won the league in 2014–15 and earned promotion to the Regionalliga Nord.

After winning the Lower Saxony Cup in 2018, SV Drochtersen/Assel qualified for the DFB-Pokal. In the first round, they were drawn at home against Bayern Munich – winner of the previous six Bundesliga titles – and lost by a sole goal from Robert Lewandowski in the last ten minutes.

In 2019, they won the Lower Saxony Cup again, qualifying for their third participation in the DFB-Pokal in four years. They were beaten 5–0 by Schalke in the first round.

== Current squad ==
As of 8 September 2026

Note: Flags indicate national team as defined under FIFA eligibility rules; some limited exceptions apply. Players may hold more than one non-FIFA nationality.

No.	Pos.	Nation	Player
3	DF	GER	Tjorve Mohr
4	DF	GER	Luca Menke
5	DF	GER	Jannes Wulff
6	MF	GER	Matti Steinmann
7	MF	GER	Jannes Elfers
8	FW	GER	Terry Becker
9	FW	GER	Tom Sanne
10	FW	GER	Christopher Schepp
11	MF	GER	Jorik Wulff
12	DF	GER	Nico von der Reith (Captain)
17	FW	GER	Martin Sattler
18	MF	PHI	Kevin Ingreso
19	MF	GER	Maurits Nagel
20	FW	GER	Ole Wohlers

No.	Pos.	Nation	Player
21	DF	GER	Niclas Dühring (on loan from Karlsruher)
22	DF	GER	Muhammad Dahaba
23	MF	GER	Maximilian Geißen
25	MF	GER	Dennis Rosin
26	DF	GER	Liam Giwah
27	DF	GER	Ole Schulz
28	FW	IRQ	Allah Aid Hamid
29	FW	GER	Sean Busch
31	MF	GER	Matti Cebulla
33	GK	GER	Jesper Heim
47	FW	GER	Philipp Aue
49	GK	GER	Bennet Marquardt
77	MF	GER	Dominique Ndure

== Honours ==
The club's honours:

- Niedersachsenliga (V)
  - Champions: 2015
- Landesliga Lüneburg (VI)
  - Champions: 2012
  - Runners-up: 2005
- Lower Saxony Cup
  - Winners: 2016, 2018, 2019

== Recent seasons ==
The recent season-by-season performance of the club:

Season	Division	Tier	Position
2001–02	Landesliga Lüneburg	VI	8th
2002–03	Landesliga Lüneburg	VI	10th
2003–04	Landesliga Lüneburg	VI	11th
2004–05	Landesliga Lüneburg	VI	2nd ↑
2005–06	Verbandsliga Niedersachsen-Ost	V	12th
2006–07	Verbandsliga Niedersachsen-Ost	V	9th
2007–08	Verbandsliga Niedersachsen-Ost	V	11th
2008–09	Oberliga Niedersachsen-Ost	V	4th
2009–10	Oberliga Niedersachsen-Ost	V	7th
2010–11	Niedersachsenliga	V	17th ↓
2011–12	Landesliga Lüneburg	VI	1st ↑
2012–13	Niedersachsenliga	V	5th
2013–14	Niedersachsenliga	V	6th
2014–15	Niedersachsenliga	V	1st ↑
2015–16	Regionalliga Nord	IV	4th
2016–17	Regionalliga Nord	IV	9th
2017–18	Regionalliga Nord	IV	12th
2018–19	Regionalliga Nord	IV	5th
2019–20	Regionalliga Nord	IV	4th
2020–21	Regionalliga Nord	IV	3rd (North region)
2021–22	Regionalliga Nord	IV	14th
2022–23	Regionalliga Nord	IV	8th
2023–24	Regionalliga Nord	IV	4th
2024–25	Regionalliga Nord	IV	3rd
2025–26	Regionalliga Nord	IV	2nd

- With the introduction of the Regionalligas in 1994 and the 3. Liga in 2008 as the new third tier, below the 2. Bundesliga, all leagues below dropped one tier. With the disbanding of the Oberliga Nord in 2008 the two Verbandsligas Ost and West in Niedersachsen were elevated to Oberliga status. From 2010 onwards the Oberliga Niedersachsen, commonly referred to as Niedersachsenliga, has been played in single division format.

Key

↑ Promoted	↓ Relegated
