= FC Teutonia Ottensen =

German association football club

FC Teutonia Altona-Ottensen
- Full name: F.C. Teutonia von 1905 e. V. Altona-Ottensen
- Founded: 1905
- Stadium: Stadion Hoheluft
- Chairman: Kevin Weidlich
- Manager: Nabil Toumi
- League: Oberliga Hamburg (V)
- 2025–26: Oberliga Hamburg, 7th of 18
- Website: https://www.fcteutonia05.de
Home colours	Away colours

FC Teutonia Ottensen or FC Teutonia Altona-Ottensen is a German association football club from the city of Hamburg founded in July 1905. The club's original ten members were joined by one-time members of FC Hammonia Hamburg which was a short-lived side notable as one of the 86 founding clubs of the Deutscher Fussball Bund (German Football Association) in Leipzig in 1900.

== History ==
Hammonia shared a common origin with FC St. Georg Hamburg as both sides arose out of the student's group Seminarvereinigung Frisch-Auf; St. Georg was formed first on the left bank of the Alster River, and Hammonia appeared later on the right bank. Hammonia played out its short existence from 1896 to 1904 in the top-flight city league known as the Hamburg/Altonaer Fussball Bund, founded in 1896.

Teutonia joined the NDFV (Norddeutscher Fussball Verband or North German Football Federation) in 1907 and by 1910 had constructed their own ground at Hogenfeldweg. Within another four years the club had captured three local championships. Like many other clubs in the country, it was decimated by World War I and fell to lower league play. They competed in the senior city circuit, the Kreisliga Groß-Hamburg, from 1921 to 1924 and again from 1926 to 1928 before disappearing into lower level play.

Ottensen remained in lower tier ball in the interwar period and through World War II. During the conflict, the team was briefly united with neighbouring association Sportverein Ottensen 07 to play as a combined wartime side known as a Kriegspielgemeinschaft. Disbanded and then later reorganized after the war, the team won promotion to the Verbandsliga Hamburg, Elbestaffel (II) in 1947. The Verbandsliga became the Amateurliga Hamburg where they played until relegated at the end of the 1951–52 season. The previous year the club had captured the Altona Cup, named for the westernmost district of the city of Hamburg.

Teutonia remained a lower-tier club over the next decades until improving somewhat in the early 1990s with a climb into the Landesliga Hamburg-Hansa (V) in 1993. The club was promoted to the Oberliga Hamburg (V) in 2017 and to the expanded Regionalliga Nord (IV) in 2020.

The club participated in the first round of the 2022–23 DFB-Pokal, losing 8–0 to RB Leipzig.

== Players ==
=== Current squad ===
As of 12 September 2024

Note: Flags indicate national team as defined under FIFA eligibility rules; some limited exceptions apply. Players may hold more than one non-FIFA nationality.

No.	Pos.	Nation	Player
1	GK	GER	Jan Niemann
3	DF	GER	Ole Wagner
4	DF	GER	Emmanuel Ntsiakoh
5	DF	GER	Marcus Coffie
6	MF	GER	Tom Kankowski
7	DF	GER	Kevin Weidlich
8	DF	GER	Manasse Fionouke
9	FW	GER	Christian Stark
10	MF	KOS	Dren Feka
11	FW	GER	Simon Sigfried
16	DF	GER	Arian Khodabakhshian
17	DF	GER	Davidson Eden
18	MF	GER	Namrud Embaye

No.	Pos.	Nation	Player
19	MF	GER	Luis Sendzik
20	MF	GER	Mohamed Abd El Aal Ali
21	DF	GER	Noel Denis
22	DF	GER	Marvin Ajani
23	FW	GER	Jason Ejesieme
27	DF	GER	Abdul-Malik Yago
29	FW	GER	Michael Kobert
30	MF	GER	Nick Gutmann
32	GK	GER	Lars Huxsohl
33	MF	GER	Feritali Erdem
34	GK	BIH	Semir Svraka
37	FW	USA	Remmy Kruse
77	FW	POR	Dominik Akyol

== Honours ==
- Hamburg Cup
  - Winners: 2022, 2023, 2024

== Naming ==
- Hammonia is the Latinized name for Hamburg and of the patron goddess of the city.
- Teutons were an early Germanic people.
