= 2017–18 FC Carl Zeiss Jena season =

Carl Zeiss Jena
2017–18 season
- Chairman: Klaus Berka
- Manager: Mark Zimmermann
- Stadium: Ernst-Abbe-Sportfeld
- 3. Liga: 11th
- Thuringian Cup: Winners
- Top goalscorer: League: Timmy Thiele (8 goals); All: Timmy Thiele (9 goals)
| Home colours | Away colours |
- All statistics correct as of 10 February 2018.

The 2017–18 FC Carl Zeiss Jena season is the 115th season in the football club's history 5th overall season in the 3. Liga, the third tier of German football, having been promoted from the Regionalliga Nordost in 2017. In addition to the domestic league, Carl Zeiss Jena also participated in this season's edition of the Thuringian Cup, the regional cup for teams in Thuringia. Jena play their matches at the Ernst-Abbe-Sportfeld, located in Jena, Thuringia, Germany. The season covers a period from 1 July 2017 to 30 June 2018.

== Players ==
=== Squad information ===
As of 29 April 2018

Note: Flags indicate national team as defined under FIFA eligibility rules; some limited exceptions apply. Players may hold more than one non-FIFA nationality.

| No. | Pos. | Nation | Player |
|---|---|---|---|
| 1 | GK | POL | Raphael Koczor |
| 2 | DF | GER | Florian Brügmann |
| 3 | DF | FRA | Guillaume Cros |
| 4 | DF | GER | Justin Gerlach |
| 5 | DF | GER | Matthias Kühne |
| 6 | MF | GER | Jan Löhmannsröben |
| 7 | FW | GER | Timmy Thiele |
| 8 | MF | GER | Maximilian Wolfram |
| 9 | MF | GER | René Eckardt (Captain) |
| 10 | MF | GER | Maximilian Schlegel |
| 11 | FW | NAM | Manfred Starke |
| 12 | GK | GER | Stefan Schmidt |
| 14 | MF | GER | Dominik Bock |

| No. | Pos. | Nation | Player |
|---|---|---|---|
| 15 | DF | GER | Marius Grösch |
| 16 | FW | GER | Timo Mauer (on loan from SC Paderborn) |
| 17 | MF | GER | Niclas Erlbeck |
| 18 | DF | GER | Davud Tuma |
| 19 | FW | GER | Florian Dietz |
| 20 | DF | TUR | Firat Sucsuz |
| 21 | DF | GER | Dennis Slamar |
| 22 | GK | BEL | Jo Coppens |
| 23 | DF | GER | Sören Eismann |
| 25 | MF | GER | Justin Schau |
| 26 | MF | GER | Kevin Pannewitz |
| 27 | FW | GER | Julian Günther-Schmidt (on loan from FC Augsburg) |
| 28 | DF | GER | Valentin Reitstetter |

== Competitions ==
Win Draw Loss

=== Overview ===
| Competition | First match | Last match | Starting round | Record | | | | | | | |
| Competition | First match | Last match | Starting round | Pld | W | D | L | GF | GA | GD | Win % |
|---|---|---|---|---|---|---|---|---|---|---|---|
| 3. Liga | 22 July 2017 | 12 May 2018 | Matchday 1 | 24 | 7 | 7 | 10 | 27 | 33 | −6 | 29.17 |
| Thuringian Cup | 12 August 2017 | | First round | 4 | 4 | 0 | 0 | 13 | 2 | +11 | 100.00 |
| Total | | | | 28 | 11 | 7 | 10 | 40 | 35 | +5 | 39.29 |

Last updated: 10 February 2018
Source: Competitions

=== 3. Liga ===
==== League table ====
| Pos | Team | Pld | W | D | L | GF | GA | GD | Pts |
|---|---|---|---|---|---|---|---|---|---|
| 9 | SpVgg Unterhaching | 38 | 16 | 6 | 16 | 54 | 55 | −1 | 54 |
| 10 | Preußen Münster | 38 | 14 | 10 | 14 | 50 | 49 | +1 | 52 |
| 11 | Carl Zeiss Jena | 38 | 14 | 10 | 14 | 49 | 59 | −10 | 52 |
| 12 | VfR Aalen | 38 | 13 | 11 | 14 | 48 | 57 | −9 | 50 |
| 13 | Hallescher FC | 38 | 13 | 10 | 15 | 52 | 54 | −2 | 49 |

Source: DFB
Rules for classification: 1) Points; 2) Goal difference; 3) Goals scored

==== Results summary ====
| Overall | | | | | | | | Home | | | | | | Away | | | | | |
| Pld | W | D | L | GF | GA | GD | Pts | W | D | L | GF | GA | GD | W | D | L | GF | GA | GD |
|---|---|---|---|---|---|---|---|---|---|---|---|---|---|---|---|---|---|---|---|
| 24 | 7 | 7 | 10 | 27 | 33 | −6 | 28 | 6 | 6 | 1 | 19 | 13 | +6 | 1 | 1 | 9 | 8 | 20 | −12 |

Last updated: 10 February 2018.
Source: kicker

==== Results by round ====
| Round | 1 | 2 | 3 | 4 | 5 | 6 | 7 | 8 | 9 | 10 | 11 | 12 | 13 | 14 | 15 | 16 | 17 | 18 | 19 | 20 | 21 | 22 | 23 | 24 | 25 | 26 | 27 | 28 | 29 | 30 | 31 | 32 | 33 | 34 | 35 | 36 | 37 | 38 |
|---|---|---|---|---|---|---|---|---|---|---|---|---|---|---|---|---|---|---|---|---|---|---|---|---|---|---|---|---|---|---|---|---|---|---|---|---|---|---|
| Ground | A | H | A | H | A | H | A | H | A | H | A | H | A | H | A | H | H | A | H | H | A | H | A | H | A | H | A | H | A | H | A | H | A | H | A | A | H | A |
| Result | L | L | W | D | L | D | L | D | D | W | L | W | L | W | L | W | D | L | D | W | L | W | L | D | | | | | | | | | | | | | | |
| Position | 15 | 20 | 10 | 10 | 14 | 15 | 20 | 20 | 19 | 15 | 18 | 15 | 17 | 13 | 14 | 12 | 12 | 13 | 13 | 12 | 14 | 12 | 15 | | | | | | | | | | | | | | | |

Updated to match(es) played on 10 February 2018. Source: kicker
A = Away; H = Home; W = Win; D = Draw; L = Loss

==== Matches ====
| 22 July 2017 1 | Wehen Wiesbaden | 1–0 | Carl Zeiss Jena | Wiesbaden |
| 13:00 CEST (UTC+2) | Reddemann 45+1' | Report | | Stadium: Brita-Arena; Attendance: 2,753; Referee: Marco Fritz |

| 29 July 2017 2 | Carl Zeiss Jena | 0–2 | Fortuna Köln | Jena |
| 13:00 CEST (UTC+2) | | Report | Dahmani 46', 55' | Stadium: Ernst-Abbe-Sportfeld; Attendance: 5,103; Referee: Martin Petersen |

| 1 August 2017 3 | Hallescher FC | 0–2 | Carl Zeiss Jena | Halle |
| 18:00 CEST (UTC+2) | | Report | Thiele 36'; Tuma 60' | Stadium: Erdgas Sportpark; Attendance: 10,019; Referee: Lasse Koslowski |

| 5 August 2017 4 | Carl Zeiss Jena | 1–1 | Chemnitzer FC | Jena |
| 13:00 CEST (UTC+2) | Löhmannsröben 72' | Report | Frahn 80' | Stadium: Ernst-Abbe-Sportfeld; Attendance: 7,017; Referee: Sven Jablonski |

| 20 August 2017 5 | Sportfreunde Lotte | 4–0 | Carl Zeiss Jena | Lotte |
| 13:00 CEST (UTC+2) | Dej 33' (pen.); Al Ghaddioui 34', 74'; Piossek 50' | Report | | Stadium: Frimo Stadion; Attendance: 1,923; Referee: Tim-Julian Skorczyk |

| 26 August 2017 6 | Carl Zeiss Jena | 0–0 | Sonnenhof Großaspach | Jena |
| 13:00 CEST (UTC+2) | | Report | | Stadium: Ernst-Abbe-Sportfeld; Attendance: 3,903; Referee: Florian Kornblum |

| 9 September 2017 7 | Rot-Weiß Erfurt | 1–0 | Carl Zeiss Jena | Erfurt |
| 13:00 CEST (UTC+2) | Bieber 68' | Report | | Stadium: Steigerwaldstadion; Attendance: 12,499; Referee: Bastian Dankert |

| 16 September 2017 8 | Carl Zeiss Jena | 2–2 | SV Meppen | Jena |
| 13:00 CEST (UTC+2) | Eismann 58', 81' | Report | Kleinsorge 18'; Vidović 45+1' | Stadium: Ernst-Abbe-Sportfeld; Attendance: 4,229; Referee: Benjamin Bläser |

| 20 September 2017 9 | Würzburger Kickers | 2–2 | Carl Zeiss Jena | Würzburg |
| 18:00 CEST (UTC+2) | Ademi 51' (pen.); Slamar 83' (o.g.) | Report | Eckardt 6'; Günther-Schmidt 20' | Stadium: Flyeralarm Arena; Attendance: 5,480; Referee: Asmir Osmanagić |

| 23 September 2017 10 | Carl Zeiss Jena | 2–0 | Preußen Münster | Jena |
| 13:00 CEST (UTC+2) | Günther-Schmidt 29' (pen.); Starke 90' | Report | | Stadium: Ernst-Abbe-Sportfeld; Attendance: 4,280; Referee: Felix-Benjamin Schwermer |

| 1 October 2017 11 | 1. FC Magdeburg | 2–0 | Carl Zeiss Jena | Magdeburg |
| 13:00 CEST (UTC+2) | Türpitz 36'; Hammann 85' | Report | | Stadium: MDCC-Arena; Attendance: 20,778; Referee: Frank Willenborg |

| 14 October 2017 12 | Carl Zeiss Jena | 1–0 | Hansa Rostock | Jena |
| 13:00 CEST (UTC+2) | Brügmann 85' | Report | | Stadium: Ernst-Abbe-Sportfeld; Attendance: 8,045; Referee: Martin Thomsen |

| 22 October 2017 13 | FSV Zwickau | 2–1 | Carl Zeiss Jena | Zwickau |
| 13:00 CEST (UTC+2) | König 35', 49' | Report | Bock 4' | Stadium: Stadion Zwickau; Attendance: 8,126; Referee: Timo Gerach |

| 28 October 2017 14 | Carl Zeiss Jena | 3–1 | SC Paderborn | Jena |
| 13:00 CEST (UTC+2) | Strohdiek 17' (o.g.); Grösch 22'; Wolfram 64' | Report | Ritter 63' | Stadium: Ernst-Abbe-Sportfeld; Attendance: 4,219; Referee: Florian Badstübner |

| 4 November 2017 15 | VfR Aalen | 3–1 | Carl Zeiss Jena | Aalen |
| 13:00 CET (UTC+1) | Preißinger 47'; Vasiliadis 55', 67' | Report | Eismann 45+2' | Stadium: Ostalb Arena; Attendance: 3,791; Referee: Eric Müller |

| 18 November 2017 16 | Carl Zeiss Jena | 2–1 | Werder Bremen II | Jena |
| 13:00 CET (UTC+1) | Bock 16'; Erlbeck 86' | Report | Kazior 77' | Stadium: Ernst-Abbe-Sportfeld; Attendance: 4,230; Referee: Michael Bacher |

| 25 November 2017 17 | Carl Zeiss Jena | 0–0 | VfL Osnabrück | Jena |
| 13:00 CET (UTC+1) | | Report | | Stadium: Ernst-Abbe-Sportfeld; Attendance: 3,885; Referee: Steffen Brütting |

| 3 December 2017 18 | SpVgg Unterhaching | 3–2 | Carl Zeiss Jena | Unterhaching |
| 13:00 CET (UTC+1) | Taffertshofer 31'; Stahl 49'; Hagn 84' | Report | Starke 8'; Eismann 90+2' | Stadium: Alpenbauer Sportpark; Attendance: 3,250; Referee: Patrick Ittrich |

| 9 December 2017 19 | Carl Zeiss Jena | 0–0 | Karlsruher SC | Jena |
| 12:00 CET (UTC+1) | | Report | | Stadium: Ernst-Abbe-Sportfeld; Attendance: 4,478; Referee: Bastian Börner |

| 16 December 2017 20 | Carl Zeiss Jena | 4–3 | Wehen Wiesbaden | Jena |
| 12:00 CET (UTC+1) | Thiele 43', 51', 55', 64' | Report | Mockenhaupt 35'; Andrist 82'; Blacha 90' | Stadium: Ernst-Abbe-Sportfeld; Attendance: 3,480; Referee: Robert Hartmann |

| 20 January 2018 21 | Fortuna Köln | 1–0 | Carl Zeiss Jena | Cologne |
| 13:00 CET (UTC+1) | Brandenburger 60' | Report | | Stadium: Südstadion; Attendance: 1,935; Referee: Eric Müller |

| 28 January 2018 22 | Carl Zeiss Jena | 2–1 | Hallescher FC | Jena |
| 13:00 CET (UTC+1) | Thiele 62', 72' | Report | Zenga 74' | Stadium: Ernst-Abbe-Sportfeld; Attendance: 7,260; Referee: Tobias Reichel |

| 3 February 2018 23 | Chemnitzer FC | 1–0 | Carl Zeiss Jena | Chemnitz |
| 13:00 CET (UTC+1) | Baumgart 79' | Report | | Stadium: Community4you Arena; Attendance: 7,017; Referee: Felix-Benjamin Schwermer |

| 10 February 2018 24 | Carl Zeiss Jena | 2–2 | Sportfreunde Lotte | Jena |
| 13:00 CET (UTC+1) | Günther-Schmidt 10'; Thiele 45' (pen.) | Report | Oesterhelweg 26'; Pires-Rodrigues 35' (pen.) | Stadium: Ernst-Abbe-Sportfeld; Attendance: 3,732; Referee: Jonas Weickenmeier |

| 17 February 2018 25 | Sonnenhof Großaspach | v | Carl Zeiss Jena | Aspach |
| 13:00 CET (UTC+1) | | Report | | Stadium: Mechatronik Arena |

| 25 February 2018 26 | Carl Zeiss Jena | v | Rot-Weiß Erfurt | Jena |
| 13:00 CET (UTC+1) | | Report | | Stadium: Ernst-Abbe-Sportfeld |

| 3 March 2018 27 | SV Meppen | v | Carl Zeiss Jena | Meppen |
| 13:00 CET (UTC+1) | | Report | | Stadium: Hänsch-Arena |

| 6 March 2018 28 | Carl Zeiss Jena | v | Würzburger Kickers | Jena |
| 18:00 CET (UTC+1) | | Report | | Stadium: Ernst-Abbe-Sportfeld |

| 10 March 2018 29 | Preußen Münster | v | Carl Zeiss Jena | Münster |
| 13:00 CET (UTC+1) | | Report | | Stadium: Preußenstadion |

| 17 March 2018 30 | Carl Zeiss Jena | v | 1. FC Magdeburg | Jena |
| 13:00 CET (UTC+1) | | Report | | Stadium: Ernst-Abbe-Sportfeld |

| 24 March 2018 31 | Hansa Rostock | v | Carl Zeiss Jena | Rostock |
| 13:00 CET (UTC+1) | | Report | | Stadium: Ostseestadion |

| 32 | Carl Zeiss Jena | v | FSV Zwickau | Jena |
| | | Report | | Stadium: Ernst-Abbe-Sportfeld |

| 33 | SC Paderborn | v | Carl Zeiss Jena | Paderborn |
| | | Report | | Stadium: Benteler-Arena |

| 34 | Carl Zeiss Jena | v | VfR Aalen | Jena |
| | | Report | | Stadium: Ernst-Abbe-Sportfeld |

| 35 | Werder Bremen II | v | Carl Zeiss Jena | Bremen |
| | | Report | | Stadium: Weserstadion Platz 11 |

| 36 | VfL Osnabrück | v | Carl Zeiss Jena | Osnabrück |
| | | Report | | Stadium: Stadion an der Bremer Brücke |

| 5 May 2018 37 | Carl Zeiss Jena | v | SpVgg Unterhaching | Jena |
| 12:30 CEST (UTC+2) | | Report | | Stadium: Ernst-Abbe-Sportfeld |

| 12 May 2018 38 | Karlsruher SC | v | Carl Zeiss Jena | Karlsruhe |
| 12:30 CEST (UTC+2) | | Report | | Stadium: Wildparkstadion |

=== Thuringian Cup ===
| 12 August 2017 First round | SC Leinefelde 1912 | 0–5 | Carl Zeiss Jena | Leinefelde-Worbis |
| 15:00 CEST (UTC+2) | | Report | Dietz 13', 23', 84'; Thiele 31'; Tuma 56' | Stadium: Leine-Sport-Park; Attendance: 502; Referee: Marko Gaßmann |

| 2 September 2017 Second round | Motor Altenburg | 0–3 | Carl Zeiss Jena | Altenburg |
| 15:00 CEST (UTC+2) | | Report | Starke 44' (pen.); Dietz 59'; Wolfram 75' | Stadium: Skatbank-Arena; Attendance: 1,100; Referee: Michael Wilske |

| 8 October 2017 Round of 16 | Carl Zeiss Jena | 2–1 | Rot-Weiß Erfurt | Jena |
| 14:05 CEST (UTC+2) | Günther-Schmidt 67'; Erlbeck 71' | Report | Menz 90+4' (pen.) | Stadium: Ernst-Abbe-Sportfeld; Attendance: 8,649; Referee: Steven Greif |

| 12 November 2017 Quarter-finals | ZFC Meuselwitz | 1–3 (a.e.t.) | Carl Zeiss Jena | Meuselwitz |
| 13:30 CET (UTC+1) | Mäder 79' | Report | Bock 4'; Eckardt 112'; Dietz 116' | Stadium: Bluechip-Arena; Attendance: 1,946; Referee: Michael Wilske |

| Semi-finals | v |
