= 2010–11 Regionalliga =

3rd season of the Regionalliga

Regionalliga
- Season: 2010–11
- Promoted: Chemnitzer FC; Preußen Münster; SV Darmstadt 98
- Relegated: TSV Havelse; Eintracht Braunschweig II; FC Oberneuland; Türkiyemspor Berlin; Fortuna Düsseldorf II; FC 08 Homburg; Arminia Bielefeld II; SV Wehen Wiesbaden II; SSV Ulm 1846; SpVgg Weiden

The 2010–11 Regionalliga season was the seventeenth since its re-establishment after German reunification and the third as a fourth-level league within the German football league system. It was contested in three divisions with eighteen teams each.

== Team changes from 2009–10 ==
=== Movement between 3. Liga and Regionalliga ===
The champions of the three 2009–10 Regionalliga divisions were promoted to the 2010–11 3. Liga. These were SV Babelsberg 03 (North), 1. FC Saarbrücken (West) and VfR Aalen (South).

Holstein Kiel, Borussia Dortmund II and Wuppertaler SV Borussia were relegated from the 2009–10 3. Liga after finishing the season in the bottom three places.

=== Movement between Regionalliga and fifth-level leagues ===
Goslarer SC and FC St. Pauli II were relegated from North division. Tennis Borussia Berlin went into administration and hence were relegated as well. They, however, ended the season in a position which would have sealed relegation anyway. Hansa Rostock II decided to withdraw from the league for financial reasons resulting in FC Oberneuland avoiding relegation. The three teams which would have been relegated as a result of finishing bottom of the West division (Eintracht Trier, Wormatia Worms and Borussia Mönchengladbach II) remain in the league as Rot-Weiss Essen, Bonner SC and Waldhof Mannheim were excluded due to financial reasons. FC Bayern Alzenau and Eintracht Bamberg were relegated after finishing bottom at the end of the South division's season. Wehen Wiesbaden II remain in the league after SSV Reutlingen went into administration and hence were excluded from the league.

The relegated teams were replaced by teams from the fifth-level leagues of the German league pyramid and allocated to one of the three divisions. Eintracht Braunschweig II as winners of an Oberliga Niedersachsen-Ost, TSV Havelse as winners of an Oberliga Niedersachsen-West, Energie Cottbus II as NOFV-Oberliga Nord champions and RB Leipzig as winners of the NOFV-Oberliga Süd joined the Northern division. NRW-Liga champions SC Wiedenbrück and runners-up Arminia Bielefeld II along with Oberliga Südwest champions FC 08 Homburg were included to the Western division. Finally, 1899 Hoffenheim II as winners of the Oberliga Baden-Württemberg, FC Memmingen as Bayernliga champions and FSV Frankfurt II as Hessenliga champions were added to the Southern division.

=== Movement between divisions ===
In order to achieve a size of eighteen teams for each division, Wormatia Worms were moved from the Western to the Southern division for this season.

== Regionalliga Nord (North) ==
=== League table ===
Pos	Team	Pld	W	D	L	GF	GA	GD	Pts	Promotion or relegation
1	Chemnitzer FC (C, P)	34	25	7	2	82	23	+59	82	Promotion to 3. Liga
2	VfL Wolfsburg II	34	23	6	5	59	28	+31	75	
3	VfB Lübeck	34	21	6	7	58	36	+22	69	
4	RB Leipzig	34	18	10	6	57	29	+28	64	
5	Hallescher FC	34	16	10	8	51	34	+17	58	
6	Holstein Kiel	34	15	10	9	65	36	+29	55	
7	Hertha BSC II	34	15	7	12	47	49	−2	52	
8	Hamburger SV II	34	14	7	13	57	49	+8	49	
9	Hannover 96 II	34	13	7	14	56	47	+9	46	
10	Energie Cottbus II	34	13	6	15	49	51	−2	45	
11	ZFC Meuselwitz	34	12	6	16	41	53	−12	42	
12	1. FC Magdeburg	34	11	8	15	37	46	−9	41	
13	SV Wilhelmshaven	34	11	8	15	48	61	−13	41	
14	VFC Plauen	34	11	6	17	43	48	−5	39	
15	TSV Havelse	34	10	5	19	45	67	−22	35	
16	Eintracht Braunschweig II (R)	34	7	8	19	31	54	−23	29	Relegation to Oberliga
17	FC Oberneuland (R)	34	8	4	22	46	77	−31	28	Relegation to Oberliga
18	Türkiyemspor Berlin (Note: Türkiyemspor Berlin were docked three points because of providing insufficient information during the licensing process previous to this season.) (R)	34	0	5	29	12	96	−84	2	Relegation to Oberliga

Source: kicker.de
Rules for classification: 1) points; 2) goal difference; 3) number of goals scored.
(C) Champions; (P) Promoted; (R) Relegated

=== Top goalscorers ===
Source: kicker (German)

25 goals

- (Germany) Benjamin Förster (Chemnitzer FC)

18 goals

- (Germany) Marc Heider (Holstein Kiel)

16 goals

- (Germany) Daniel Frahn (RB Leipzig)
- (Germany) Bastian Henning (VfB Lübeck)

14 goals

- (Poland) Rafael Kazior (Hamburger SV II)

13 goals

- (Germany) Terrence Boyd (Hertha BSC II)
- (Germany) Fabian Klos (VfL Wolfsburg II)
- (Germany) Max Wegner (SV Wilhelmshaven)

12 goals

- (Germany) Lars Fuchs (Hannover 96 II)
- (Germany) Fiete Sykora (Holstein Kiel)

=== Stadia and locations ===
Locations of teams in the 2010-11 Regionalliga North

Team	Location	Stadium	Stadium capacity
Hannover 96 II	Hannover	AWD-Arena	49,000
RB Leipzig	Leipzig	Zentralstadion	44,193
1. FC Magdeburg	Magdeburg	MDCC-Arena	27,250
Eintracht Braunschweig II	Braunschweig	Eintracht-Stadion	23,500
Energie Cottbus II	Cottbus	Stadion der Freundschaft	22,528
Türkiyemspor Berlin	Berlin	Friedrich-Ludwig-Jahn-Sportpark	20,000
VfB Lübeck	Lübeck	Lohmühle	17,869
VfL Wolfsburg II	Wolfsburg	VfL-Stadion	17,600
Chemnitzer FC	Chemnitz	Stadion an der Gellertstraße	16,061
Holstein Kiel	Kiel	Holstein-Stadion	12,000
VFC Plauen	Plauen	Vogtlandstadion	12,000
SV Wilhelmshaven	Wilhelmshaven	Jadestadion	7,500
TSV Havelse	Garbsen	Wilhelm-Langrehr-Stadion	6,000
Hertha BSC II	Berlin	Amateurstadion	5,400
ZFC Meuselwitz	Meuselwitz	bluechip-Arena	5,300
Hamburger SV II	Hamburg	Edmund Plambeck Stadion	5,100
Hallescher FC	Halle	Stadion im Bildungszentrum	5,000
FC Oberneuland	Bremen	Sportpark Vinnenweg	5,000

== Regionalliga West ==
=== League table ===
Pos	Team	Pld	W	D	L	GF	GA	GD	Pts	Promotion or relegation
1	Preußen Münster (C, P)	34	22	6	6	56	24	+32	72	Promotion to 3. Liga
2	Eintracht Trier	34	18	8	8	58	34	+24	62	
3	Sportfreunde Lotte	34	17	11	6	43	29	+14	62	
4	1. FC Kaiserslautern II	34	16	11	7	53	36	+17	59	
5	Borussia Mönchengladbach II	34	16	11	7	53	41	+12	59	
6	Borussia Dortmund II	34	15	7	12	56	47	+9	52	
7	1. FC Köln II	34	13	12	9	61	43	+18	51	
8	Wuppertaler SV Borussia	34	14	8	12	52	59	−7	50	
9	SC Verl	34	12	12	10	40	34	+6	48	
10	SC Wiedenbrück 2000	34	13	7	14	50	55	−5	46	
11	FC Schalke 04 II	34	12	8	14	34	45	−11	44	
12	SV Elversberg	34	10	13	11	39	44	−5	43	
13	FSV Mainz 05 II	34	11	8	15	48	51	−3	41	
14	VfL Bochum II	34	8	10	16	49	64	−15	34	
15	Bayer Leverkusen II	34	9	6	19	43	58	−15	33	
16	Fortuna Düsseldorf II	34	8	7	19	41	55	−14	31	
17	FC 08 Homburg (R)	34	7	9	18	29	49	−20	30	Relegation to Oberliga
18	Arminia Bielefeld II (R)	34	5	6	23	30	67	−37	21	Relegation to Oberliga

Source: kicker.de
Rules for classification: 1) points; 2) goal difference; 3) number of goals scored.
(C) Champions; (P) Promoted; (R) Relegated

=== Top goalscorers ===
Source: kicker (German)

18 goals

- (Germany) Robert Mainka (SC Wiedenbrück 2000)

15 goals

- (Albania) Alban Meha (Eintracht Trier)
- (United States) Andrew Wooten (1. FC Kaiserslautern II)

12 goals

- (Germany) Ben Abelski (Fortuna Düsseldorf II)
- (Germany) Jerome Assauer (Wuppertaler SV Borussia)
- (Germany) Daniel Ginczek (Borussia Dortmund II)
- (Croatia) Petar Slisković (FSV Mainz 05 II)
- (Germany) Simon Terodde (1. FC Köln II)

11 goals

- (Germany) Fabian Bäcker (Borussia Mönchengladbach II)
- (Germany) Marcus Fischer (SV Elversberg)
- (France) Damien Le Tallec (Borussia Dortmund II)
- (Austria) Lukas Mössner (Eintracht Trier)

=== Stadia and locations ===
Locations of teams in the 2010-11 Regionalliga West

Team	Location	Stadium	Stadium capacity
1. FC Kaiserslautern II	Kaiserslautern	Fritz-Walter-Stadion	48,500
Wuppertaler SV	Wuppertal	Stadion am Zoo	28,300
Borussia Dortmund II	Dortmund	Stadion Rote Erde	25,000
FC 08 Homburg	Homburg	Waldstadion	22,500
FSV Mainz 05 II	Mainz	Stadion am Bruchweg	20,300
VfL Bochum II	Bochum	Lohrheide-Stadion	16,233
FC Schalke 04 II	Gelsenkirchen	Sportpark Wanne-Süd	16,000
Preußen Münster	Münster	Preußenstadion	15,050
Bayer Leverkusen II	Leverkusen	Südstadion	12,000
Arminia Bielefeld II	Bielefeld	Stadion Russheide	12,000
Eintracht Trier	Trier	Moselstadion	10,252
Borussia Mönchengladbach II	Mönchengladbach	Grenzlandstadion	10,000
Fortuna Düsseldorf II	Düsseldorf	Paul-Janes-Stadion	8,698
SV Elversberg	Elversberg	Waldstadion an der Kaiserlinde	6,008
Sportfreunde Lotte	Lotte	PGW Arena	5,500
SC Verl	Verl	Stadion an der Poststraße	5,000
1. FC Köln II	Köln	Franz-Kremer-Stadion	5,000
SC Wiedenbrück	Wiedenbrück	Jahnstadion	4,000

== Regionalliga Süd (South) ==
=== League table ===
Pos	Team	Pld	W	D	L	GF	GA	GD	Pts	Promotion or relegation
1	SV Darmstadt 98 (C, P)	30	18	8	4	50	26	+24	62	Promotion to 3. Liga
2	Stuttgarter Kickers	30	17	7	6	54	28	+26	58	
3	Hessen Kassel	30	16	6	8	59	37	+22	54	
4	SpVgg Greuther Fürth II	30	14	6	10	51	42	+9	48	
5	TSG 1899 Hoffenheim II	30	13	7	10	60	40	+20	46	
6	Eintracht Frankfurt II	30	14	4	12	56	48	+8	46	
7	SC Freiburg II	30	12	7	11	65	54	+11	43	
8	1860 Munich II	30	11	8	11	39	54	−15	41	
9	SC Pfullendorf	30	12	4	14	40	43	−3	40	
10	Karlsruher SC II	30	10	9	11	42	37	+5	39	
11	1. FC Nürnberg II	30	10	7	13	43	46	−3	37	
12	Wormatia Worms	30	10	6	14	40	45	−5	36	
13	FC Memmingen	30	9	9	12	33	50	−17	36	
14	SG Sonnenhof Großaspach	30	8	9	13	29	44	−15	33	
15	FSV Frankfurt II	30	6	8	16	31	52	−21	26	
16	Wehen Wiesbaden II (R)	30	5	5	20	25	71	−46	20	Relegation to Oberliga
17	SSV Ulm 1846 (Note: SSV Ulm filed for administration on 3 January 2011 and hence will be relegated at the end of the season.) (R)	0	0	0	0	0	0	0	0	Relegation to Oberliga
18	SpVgg Weiden (Note: SpVgg Weiden filed for administration on 1 December 2010 and voluntarily withdrew from the league.) (R)	0	0	0	0	0	0	0	0	Relegation to Oberliga

Source: kicker.de
Rules for classification: 1) points; 2) goal difference; 3) number of goals scored.
(C) Champions; (P) Promoted; (R) Relegated

=== Top goalscorers ===
Source: kicker (German)

19 goals

- (Germany) Kai Herdling (1899 Hoffenheim II)

18 goals

- (Germany) Simon Brandstetter (SC Freiburg II)

17 goals

- (Germany) Christian Bickel (SC Freiburg II)

16 goals

- (Germany) Rudolf Hübner (Wormatia Worms)

15 goals

- (Germany) Tobias Damm (Hessen Kassel)

14 goals

- (Germany) Andreas Mayer (Hessen Kassel)

12 goals

- (Germany) Oliver Heil (SV Darmstadt 98)

11 goals

- (Germany) Michael Schürg (SV Darmstadt 98)
- (Germany) Cenk Tosun^{1} (Eintracht Frankfurt II)

10 goals

- (Germany) Marcos Alvarez^{2} (Eintracht Frankfurt II)
- (Germany) Aziz Bouhaddouz (FSV Frankfurt II)
- (Germany) Ali Pala (Stuttgarter Kickers)

Notes

- ^1 Cenk Tosun was transferred to Gaziantepspor during the winter transfer window.
- ^2 Marcos Alvarez was transferred to Bayern Munich II during the winter transfer window.

=== Stadia and locations ===
Locations of teams in the 2010-11 Regionalliga South

Team	Location	Stadium	Stadium capacity
Karlsruher SC II	Karlsruhe	Wildparkstadion	29,699
SSV Ulm 1846	Ulm	Donaustadion	19,500
SV Darmstadt 98	Darmstadt	Böllenfalltor Stadion	19,000
KSV Hessen Kassel	Kassel	Auestadion	18,800
SC Freiburg II	Freiburg	Möslestadion	18,000
SG Sonnenhof Großaspach	Großaspach	Frankenstadion	17,284
SpVgg Greuther Fürth II	Fürth	Playmobil-Stadion	15,500
SpVgg Weiden	Weiden	Stadion am Wasserwerk	15,000
FC Memmingen	Memmingen	Stadion an der Bodenseestrasse	15,000
Wehen Wiesbaden II	Wiesbaden	Brita-Arena	12,066
Stuttgarter Kickers	Stuttgart	GAZi-Stadion auf der Waldau	11,493
Eintracht Frankfurt II	Frankfurt	Frankfurter Volksbank Stadion	10,826
FSV Frankfurt II	Frankfurt	Frankfurter Volksbank Stadion	10,826
TSV 1860 Munich II	Munich	Grünwalder Stadion	10,240
SC Pfullendorf	Pfullendorf	ALNO-Arena	10,000
1. FC Nürnberg II	Nuremberg	Valznerweiher	7,000
Wormatia Worms	Worms	Wormatia-Stadion	6,997
TSG 1899 Hoffenheim II	Hoffenheim	Dietmar Hopp Stadion	6,350
