= 2021–22 MSV Duisburg season =

MSV Duisburg
2021–22 season
- Manager: Pavel Dochev (until 7 October 2021); Uwe Schubert (7–18 October 2021); Hagen Schmidt (18 October 2021 – 4 May 2022); Torsten Ziegner (from 4 May 2022)
- Stadium: MSV-Arena
- 3. Liga: 15th
- Lower Rhine Cup: Semifinals
- Top goalscorer: League: Orhan Ademi (12); All: Orhan Ademi (17)
- Highest home attendance: 12,105 (vs 1860 Munich)
- Lowest home attendance: 750 two matches
- Average home league attendance: 6,932 (Note: Due to the COVID-19 pandemic in Germany, the local health department dictates the number of spectators.)
- Biggest win: Duisburg 8–0 Krefeld
- Biggest defeat: Duisburg 0–6 1860 Munich
Home colours	Away colours	Third colours

The 2021–22 MSV Duisburg season was the 122nd season in the club's football history. In 2021–22 the club played in the 3. Liga, the third tier of German football alongside the Lower Rhine Cup.

== Team ==
Note: Flags indicate national team as defined under FIFA eligibility rules; some limited exceptions apply. Players may hold more than one non-FIFA nationality.

No.	Pos.	Nation	Player
1	GK	GER	Leo Weinkauf (on loan from Hannover 96)
4	DF	GER	Dominic Volkmer
5	DF	GER	Leroy Kwadwo
6	MF	GER	Marvin Bakalorz
7	MF	GER	Kolja Pusch
9	MF	GER	Alaa Bakir
10	MF	GER	Moritz Stoppelkamp (Captain)
11	FW	MAR	Aziz Bouhaddouz
13	FW	GER	Julian Hettwer
14	DF	BUL	Stefan Velkov
15	DF	GER	Tobias Fleckstein
17	DF	GER	Marvin Knoll
18	MF	GER	Caspar Jander

No.	Pos.	Nation	Player
19	FW	GER	Chinedu Ekene
20	MF	GER	Marvin Ajani
21	DF	VEN	Rolf Feltscher
22	MF	GER	Rudolf Ndualu
23	MF	GER	Niclas Stierlin
24	GK	GER	Roman Schabbing
26	DF	GER	Vincent Gembalies
27	DF	GER	Niko Bretschneider
28	DF	GER	Oliver Steurer
29	FW	SUI	Orhan Ademi
30	GK	BEL	Jo Coppens
37	MF	GER	Marlon Frey
39	FW	GER	John Yeboah (on loan from Willem II)

== Transfers ==
=== In ===
Date	Pos.	Name	From	Type	Ref.
1 July 2021	GK	(Belgium) Jo Coppens	SpVgg Unterhaching	Transfer	
1 July 2021	GK	(Germany) Leo Weinkauf	Hannover 96	Loan	
1 July 2021	DF	(Germany) Rolf Feltscher	Würzburger Kickers	Transfer	
1 July 2021	DF	(Germany) Leroy Kwadwo	Dynamo Dresden	Transfer	
1 July 2021	MF	(Germany) Marvin Ajani	Wehen Wiesbaden	Transfer	
1 July 2021	MF	(Germany) Marvin Bakalorz	(Turkey) Denizlispor	Transfer	
1 July 2021	MF	(Germany) Alaa Bakir	Borussia Dortmund II	Transfer	
1 July 2021	MF	(Germany) Rudolf Ndualu	Tennis Borussia Berlin	Transfer	
1 July 2021	MF	(Germany) Kolja Pusch	KFC Uerdingen	Transfer	
1 July 2021	MF	(Germany) Niclas Stierlin	SpVgg Unterhaching	Transfer	
3 July 2021	FW	(Germany) Chinedu Ekene	1899 Hoffenheim II	Transfer	
15 July 2021	DF	(Germany) Oliver Steurer	1. FC Heidenheim	Transfer	
7 January 2022	DF	(Germany) Marvin Knoll	FC St. Pauli	Transfer	
12 January 2022	FW	(Germany) John Yeboah	(Netherlands) Willem II	Loan	

=== Out ===
Date	Pos.	Name	To	Type	Ref.
1 July 2021	GK	(Germany) Jonas Brendieck	KFC Uerdingen	End of contract	
1 July 2021	GK	(Germany) Steven Deana	(Switzerland) Servette FC	End of contract	
1 July 2021	GK	(Germany) Leo Weinkauf	Hannover 96	End of loan	
1 July 2021	DF	(Germany) Joshua Bitter	Energie Cottbus	End of contract	
1 July 2021	DF	(Germany) Arne Sicker	SV Sandhausen	End of contract	
1 July 2021	MF	(Germany) Ahmet Engin	(Turkey) Kasımpaşa	End of contract	
1 July 2021	MF	(Germany) Maximilian Jansen	FSV Zwickau	End of contract	
1 July 2021	MF	(Democratic Republic of the Congo) Wilson Kamavuaka		End of contract	
1 July 2021	MF	(Germany) Connor Krempicki	1. FC Magdeburg	End of contract	
1 July 2021	MF	(Germany) Leroy-Jacques Mickels	Türkgücü München	End of contract	
1 July 2021	MF	(Montenegro) Mirnes Pepić	Würzburger Kickers	End of contract	
1 July 2021	MF	(Germany) Lukas Scepanik	Türkgücü München	End of contract	
1 July 2021	MF	(Germany) David Tomić	Sonnenhof Großaspach	End of contract	
1 July 2021	FW	(Germany) Sinan Karweina	Türkgücü München	End of contract	
1 July 2021	FW	(Germany) Federico Palacios Martínez	Viktoria Köln	End of loan	
1 July 2021	FW	(Germany) Cem Sabanci		End of contract	
1 July 2021	FW	(Netherlands) Vincent Vermeij	SC Freiburg II	End of contract	
28 August 2021	DF	(Germany) Maximilian Sauer	(Denmark) HB Køge	Transfer	
3 January 2022	DF	(Germany) Dominik Schmidt	Atlas Delmenhorst	Contract termination	
31 January 2022	MF	(Romania) Darius Ghindovean	Preußen Münster	Transfer	

=== New contracts ===
Date	Pos.	Name	Contract length	Contract end	Ref.
27 May 2021	DF	Stefan Velkov	1-year	2022	
27 May 2021	MF	Marlon Frey	2-year	2023	
1 June 2021	DF	Vincent Gembalies	3-year	2024	
1 June 2021	FW	Julian Hettwer			
4 June 2021	MF	Darius Ghindovean	1-year	2022	
11 June 2021	FW	Aziz Bouhaddouz	2-year	2023	
2 February 2022	GK	Max Braune	2-year	2024	
2 February 2022	MF	Caspar Jander	2-year	2024	
2 February 2022	FW	Julian Hettwer	2-year	2024	

== Friendlies ==
22 June 2021 1	MSV Duisburg	2–4	Spvg Schonnebeck	Duisburg
18:00	Stoppelkamp 25'; Bukusu 88'	Report	Ketsatis 9' (pen.); Barra 30', 34'; Brandner 78'	Attendance: 0
Note: The match was played behind closed doors.

25 June 2021 2	MSV Duisburg	Cancelled	SC Paderborn	Duisburg
Note: The match was cancelled after Duisburg had several injured players.

3 July 2021 3	Beerschot (Belgium)	0–1	(Germany) MSV Duisburg
15:00		Report	Bakir 27'

10 July 2021 4	MSV Duisburg	1–1	1. FC Köln	Duisburg
17:00	Modeste 63'	Report	Stoppelkamp 90'	Attendance: 0
Note: The match was played behind closed doors.

13 July 2021 5	MSV Duisburg	2–3	Preußen Münster	Duisburg
16:00	Bakir 57'; Ghindovean 73'	Report	Schwadorf 21'; Dahlke 35', 85' (pen.)
Note: The match was played behind closed doors.

17 July 2021 6	MSV Duisburg	Cancelled	Borussia Dortmund	Duisburg
15:00				Stadium: MSV-Arena
Note: The match was cancelled after Duisburg had several players testing positive for COVID-19.

17 July 2021 7	MSV Duisburg	Cancelled	VfL Bochum	Duisburg
17:00				Stadium: MSV-Arena
Note: The match was cancelled after Duisburg had several players testing positive for COVID-19.

7 October 2021 8	MSV Duisburg (Germany)	1–4	(Belgium) Sint-Truidense	Duisburg
16:00	Stoppelkamp 50'	Report	Koita 54'; Hayashi 55'; Ito 63'; Suzuki 86'

7 January 2022 9	Fortuna Köln	2–2	MSV Duisburg	Cologne
14:00	Demaj 50', 51'	Report	Bouhaddouz 33'; Ajani 80'	Stadium: Südstadion; Attendance: 0
Note: The match was played behind closed doors.

8 January 2022 10	Preußen Münster	Cancelled	MSV Duisburg
Note: The match was cancelled after Duisburg had several players injured or in quarantine.

== Competitions ==
Times from 1 July to 30 October 2020 and from 27 March to 30 June 2021 are UTC+2, from 31 October 2020 to 26 March 2021 UTC+1.

=== Overview ===
Competition	First match	Last match	Starting round	Final position	Record							
Competition	First match	Last match	Starting round	Final position	Pld	W	D	L	GF	GA	GD	Win %
3. Liga	8 August 2021	14 May 2022	Matchday 1		38	14	3	21	46	71	−25	36.84
Lower Rhine Cup	28 September 2021	27 April 2022	Round 1	Semifinals	6	5	0	1	23	2	+21	83.33
Total					44	19	3	22	69	73	−4	43.18

Last updated: 14 May 2022
Source: Soccerway

=== 3. Liga ===
==== League table ====
Pos	Team	Pld	W	D	L	GF	GA	GD	Pts	Promotion, qualification or relegation
13	Viktoria Köln	36	12	9	15	39	52	−13	45	
14	Hallescher FC	36	10	13	13	46	48	−2	43	
15	MSV Duisburg	36	13	3	20	46	71	−25	42	
16	SC Verl	36	10	10	16	56	66	−10	40	
17	Viktoria Berlin (R)	36	10	7	19	44	62	−18	37	Relegation to Regionalliga

Source: DFB
Rules for classification: 1) Points; 2) Goal difference; 3) Goals scored; 4) Head-to-head results; 5) Head-to-head away goals scored; 6) Away goals scored; 7) Play-off.
(R) Relegated

==== Results summary ====
Overall								Home						Away					
Pld	W	D	L	GF	GA	GD	Pts	W	D	L	GF	GA	GD	W	D	L	GF	GA	GD
36	13	3	20	46	71	−25	42	7	2	9	25	37	−12	6	1	11	21	34	−13

Last updated: 14 May 2022.
Source: DFB

==== Results by round ====
Round	1	2	3	4	5	6	7	8	9	10	11	12	13	14	15	16	17	18	19	20	21	22	23	24	25	26	27	28	29	30	31	32	33	34	35	36	37	38
Ground	H	A	A	A	H	A	H	A	H	A	H	A	H	A	H	A	H	A	H	A	H	H	A	H	H	A	H	A	H	A	H	A	H	A	H	A	H	A
Result	W	L	W	L	L	L	W	L	W	L	L	L	D	L	W	L	L	L	D	W	L	L	W	L	L	W	W	L	W	W	L	L	W	W	L	L	W	D
Position	7	11	5	11	14	14	14	14	12	14	17	17	17	19	18	18	18	18	18	18	18	18	16	16	17	16	15	15	15	14	15	15	15	13	15	15	13	15

Source: DFB
A = Away; H = Home; W = Win; D = Draw; L = Loss

==== Matches ====
The league fixtures were announced on 1 July 2021.

8 August 2021 1	MSV Duisburg	3–0	TSV Havelse	Duisburg
13:00	Ademi 25'; Stoppelkamp 66' (pen.); Pusch 68'	Report		Stadium: MSV-Arena; Attendance: 7,661; Referee: Patrick Kessel
Note: Originally scheduled for 30 July 2021, the match was postponed, after Duisburg did not have enough players available due to quarantane.

14 August 2021 2	1. FC Saarbrücken	1–0	MSV Duisburg	Saarbrücken
14:00	+Günther-Schmidt 28' +Gouras 35'	Report		Stadium: Ludwigsparkstadion; Attendance: 6,204; Referee: Florian Exner

18 August 2021 3	VfL Osnabrück	0–1	MSV Duisburg	Osnabrück
19:00		Report	Stoppelkamp 40' (pen.)	Stadium: Stadion an der Bremer Brücke; Attendance: 7,004; Referee: Martin Speckner
Note: Originally scheduled for 23 July 2021, the match was postponed, after several Duisburg players were tested positive for COVID-19.

21 August 2021 4	1. FC Magdeburg	2–1	MSV Duisburg	Magdeburg
14:00	Schuler 29'; Conteh 36'	Report	Ademi 90+1'	Stadium: MDCC-Arena; Attendance: 14,400; Referee: Patrick Schwengers

25 August 2021 5	MSV Duisburg	0–2	Wehen Wiesbaden	Duisburg
19:00		Report	Nilsson 69'; Thiel 83'	Stadium: MSV-Arena; Attendance: 7,259; Referee: Lukas Benen

29 August 2021 6	Borussia Dortmund II	4–1	MSV Duisburg	Dortmund
13:00	Tigges 31', 57'; Taz 51'; Bornemann 87'	Report	Ademi 28'	Stadium: Stadion Rote Erde; Attendance: 1,432; Referee: Konrad Oldhafer

4 September 2021 7	MSV Duisburg	2–0	Würzburger Kickers	Duisburg
14:00	Steurer 5'; Frey 45+2'	Report		Stadium: MSV-Arena; Attendance: 6,560; Referee: Michael Bacher

13 September 2021 8	Türkgücü München	1–0	MSV Duisburg	Munich
19:00	Vrenezi 81'	Report		Stadium: Olympiastadion; Attendance: 600; Referee: Franz Bokop

18 September 2021 9	MSV Duisburg	3–2	Eintracht Braunschweig	Duisburg
14:00	Bretschneider 12'; Ademi 22', 70'	Report	Kobylański 79'; Strompf 90+2'	Stadium: MSV-Arena; Attendance: 7,238; Referee: Eric Müller

25 September 2021 10	Viktoria Köln	4–2	MSV Duisburg	Cologne
14:00	Handle 31'; Fritz 44'; Philipp 90+1', 90+4'	Report	Ajani 86'; Ademi 90+2'	Stadium: Sportpark Höhenberg; Attendance: 3,205; Referee: Steven Greif

2 October 2021 11	MSV Duisburg	0–1	SV Meppen	Duisburg
14:00		Report	Blacha 21'	Stadium: MSV-Arena; Attendance: 7,500; Referee: Tom Bauer

16 October 2021 12	FSV Zwickau	3–2	MSV Duisburg	Zwickau
14:00	Gomez 44' (pen.); Baumann 87'; Vogt 90+2'	Report	Ajani 29'; Ademi 46'	Stadium: Stadion Zwickau; Attendance: 3,561; Referee: Timo Gerach

25 October 2021 13	MSV Duisburg	1–1	1. FC Kaiserslautern	Duisburg
19:00	Wunderlich 82' (o.g.)	Report	Tomiak 44'	Stadium: MSV-Arena; Attendance: 10,646; Referee: Konrad Oldhafer

30 October 2021 14	Hallescher FC	2–1	MSV Duisburg	Halle
14:00	Eberwein 44'; Boyd 73'	Report	Ademi 83' (pen.)	Stadium: Erdgas Sportpark; Attendance: 5,262; Referee: Martin Speckner

6 November 2021 15	MSV Duisburg	1–0	Viktoria Berlin	Duisburg
14:00	Bouhaddouz 52'	Report		Stadium: MSV-Arena; Attendance: 7,575; Referee: Franz Bokop

20 November 2021 16	1860 Munich	3–2	MSV Duisburg	Munich
14:00	Steinhart 16' (pen.); Mölders 54'; Bär 73'	Report	Bouhaddouz 10'; Ademi 68'	Stadium: Grünwalder Stadion; Attendance: 15,000; Referee: Timo Gerach

26 November 2021 17	MSV Duisburg	1–3	Waldhof Mannheim	Duisburg
19:00	Bouhaddouz 26'	Report	Schnatterer 4'; Costly 18'; Martinović 81'	Stadium: MSV-Arena; Attendance: 8,216; Referee: Patrick Alt

5 December 2021 18	SC Freiburg II	1–0	MSV Duisburg	Freiburg
13:00	Kammerbauer 90+3' (pen.)	Report		Stadium: Dreisamstadion; Attendance: 625; Referee: Florian Lechner

11 December 2021 19	MSV Duisburg	2–2	SC Verl	Duisburg
14:00	Ademi 35'; Bouhaddouz 67' (pen.)	Report	Akono 41'; Petkov 57'	Stadium: MSV-Arena; Attendance: 5,644; Referee: Wolfgang Haslberger

14 January 2022 20	TSV Havelse	0–1	MSV Duisburg	Hanover
19:00		Report	Stoppelkamp 56'	Stadium: Niedersachsenstadion; Attendance: 386; Referee: Mario Hildenbrand

23 January 2022 21	MSV Duisburg	3–4	1. FC Saarbrücken	Duisburg
14:00	Bouhaddouz 74', 80'; Ademi 89'	Report	Jacob 12'; Weinkauf 64' (o.g.); Grimaldi 71', 79'	Stadium: MSV-Arena; Attendance: 750; Referee: Martin Speckner

26 January 2022 22	MSV Duisburg	0–5	1. FC Magdeburg	Duisburg
19:00		Report	Ito 9'; Müller 31'; Krempicki 45+4'; Atik 50'; Brünker 85'	Stadium: MSV-Arena; Attendance: 750; Referee: Florian Exner

29 January 2022 23	Wehen Wiesbaden	0–1	MSV Duisburg	Wiesbaden
14:00		Report	Bouhaddouz 62'	Stadium: Brita-Arena; Attendance: 1,000; Referee: Patrick Hanslbauer

2 February 2022 24	MSV Duisburg	3–6	VfL Osnabrück	Duisburg
19:00	Stoppelkamp 13'; Beermann 62' (o.g.); Bouhaddouz 71'	Report	Klaas 8'; Simakala 27'; Köhler 47'; Heider 52'; Kunze 81'; Higl 90+2'	Stadium: MSV-Arena; Attendance: 750; Referee: Nicolas Winter
Note: The match, originally played on 19 December 2021, was abandoned after Aaron Opoku was racially insulted by a Duisburg fan. After investigation by the police, it could not be confirmed that the player was insulted and the fan was acquitted.

6 February 2022 25	MSV Duisburg	1–3	Borussia Dortmund II	Duisburg
14:00	Stoppelkamp 8'	Report	Taz 3' (pen.), 51' (pen.); Njinmah 66'	Stadium: MSV-Arena; Attendance: 5,747; Referee: Patrick Schwengers

12 February 2022 26	Würzburger Kickers	1–2	MSV Duisburg	Würzburg
14:00	Pourié 72'	Report	Bouhaddouz 4'; Stoppelkamp 39' (pen.)	Stadium: Flyeralarm Arena; Attendance: 2,327; Referee: Franz Bokop

19 February 2022 27	MSV Duisburg	2–0	Türkgücü München	Duisburg
14:00	Stoppelkamp 20' (pen.), 55'	Report		Stadium: MSV-Arena; Attendance: 5,892; Referee: Konrad Oldhafer

26 February 2022 28	Eintracht Braunschweig	2–1	MSV Duisburg	Braunschweig
14:00	Consbruch 12'; Lauberbach 64'	Report	Fleckstein 90+1'	Stadium: Eintracht-Stadion; Attendance: 8,410; Referee: Lasse Koslowski

5 March 2022 29	MSV Duisburg	2–0	Viktoria Köln	Duisburg
14:00	Bakir 69'; Hettwer 71'	Report		Stadium: MSV-Arena; Attendance: 7,518; Referee: Eric Müller

14 March 2022 30	SV Meppen	1–2	MSV Duisburg	Meppen
19:00	Tankulic 45' (pen.)	Report	Bakir 48'; Ademi 80'	Stadium: Hänsch-Arena; Attendance: 7,119; Referee: Patrick Kessel

20 March 2022 31	MSV Duisburg	0–1	FSV Zwickau	Duisburg
13:00		Report	Könnecke 32'	Stadium: MSV-Arena; Attendance: 9,376; Referee: Robert Kampka

2 April 2022 32	1. FC Kaiserslautern	5–1	MSV Duisburg	Kaiserslautern
14:00	Boyd 37', 47', 73'; Ritter 59'; Winkler 70'	Report	Pusch 86'	Stadium: Fritz-Walter-Stadion; Attendance: 28,000; Referee: Tobias Reichel

9 April 2022 33	MSV Duisburg	2–1	Hallescher FC	Duisburg
14:00	Pusch 19'; Fleckstein 59'	Report	Huth 25'	Stadium: MSV-Arena; Attendance: 8,839; Referee: Florian Exner

16 April 2022 34	Viktoria Berlin	0–1	MSV Duisburg	Berlin
14:00		Report	Pusch 55'	Stadium: Friedrich-Ludwig-Jahn-Stadion1; Attendance: 2,043; Referee: Bastian Dankert

24 April 2022 35	MSV Duisburg	0–6	1860 Munich	Duisburg
13:00		Report	Biankadi 9'; Bär 20' (pen.), 70'; Lex 22'; Deichmann 50'; Greilinger 66'	Stadium: MSV-Arena; Attendance: 12,105; Referee: Robert Schröder

2 May 2022 36	Waldhof Mannheim	3–1	MSV Duisburg	Mannheim
19:00	Seegert 8'; Kother 34'; Verlaat 44'	Report	Ajani 84'	Stadium: Carl-Benz-Stadion; Attendance: 8,068; Referee: Patrick Kessel

7 May 2022 37	MSV Duisburg	1–0	SC Freiburg II	Duisburg
14:00	Stoppelkamp 5'	Report		Stadium: MSV-Arena; Attendance: 11,689; Referee: Konrad Oldhafer

14 May 2022 38	SC Verl	1–1	MSV Duisburg	Lotte
13:30	Berlinski 50'	Report	Stoppelkamp 33'	Stadium: Stadion am Lotter Kreuz3; Attendance: 2,854; Referee: Robert Kampka

=== Lower Rhine Cup ===
28 September 2021 Round 1	Rheinland Hamborn	0–5	MSV Duisburg	Duisburg
19:00		Report	Pusch 11'; Ghindovean 21'; Ajani 47'; Ndualu 78'; Bakir 90'	Stadium: PCC-Stadion; Attendance: 1,200; Referee: Fasihullah Habibi

20 October 2021 Round 2	Hellas Krefeld	0–8	MSV Duisburg	Duisburg
19:30		Report	Stoppelkamp 7' (pen.), 13'; Ademi 31', 34'; Frey 36', 67'; Hettwer 64'; Bakir 78'	Stadium: PCC-Stadion; Attendance: 950; Referee: Lars Aarts

13 November 2021 Round 3	SV Sonsbeck	0–3	MSV Duisburg	Sonsbeck
13:30		Report	Bouhaddouz 37', 78'; Ademi 50'	Stadium: Willy-Lemkens-Sportpark; Attendance: 2,500; Referee: Marvin Szlapa

2 March 2022 Round 4	SSVg Velbert	1–5	MSV Duisburg	Velbert
19:30	Aydın 40'	Report	Ademi 45+2', 56'; Stoppelkamp 59' (pen.); Ajani 67'; Ademi 88'	Stadium: IMS Arena; Attendance: 700; Referee: Markus Wollenweber

6 April 2022 Quarterfinals	1. FC Bocholt	0–2	MSV Duisburg	Bocholt
19:30		Report	Yeboah 34', 64'	Stadium: Gigaset Arena; Referee: Lars Aarts

27 April 2022 Semifinals	SV Straelen	1–0	MSV Duisburg	Straelen
18:30	Kader 74'	Report		Stadium: Stadion an der Römerstraße; Attendance: 2,300; Referee: Martin Ulankiewicz

== Statistics ==
=== Squad statistics ===
No.	Pos	Nat	Player	Total		3. Liga		Lower Rhine Cup	
No.	Pos	Nat	Player	Apps	Goals	Apps	Goals	Apps	Goals
1	GK	(Germany) GER	Leo Weinkauf	35	0	35	0	0	0
4	DF	(Germany) GER	Dominic Volkmer	5	0	3	0	2	0
5	DF	(Germany) GER	Leroy Kwadwo	32	0	27	0	5	0
6	MF	(Germany) GER	Marvin Bakalorz	28	0	25	0	3	0
7	MF	(Germany) GER	Kolja Pusch	35	5	31	4	4	1
9	MF	(Germany) GER	Alaa Bakir	35	4	30	2	5	2
10	MF	(Germany) GER	Moritz Stoppelkamp	36	13	31	10	5	3
11	FW	(Morocco) MAR	Aziz Bouhaddouz	32	11	27	9	5	2
13	FW	(Germany) GER	Julian Hettwer	31	2	26	1	5	1
14	DF	(Bulgaria) BUL	Stefan Velkov	18	0	16	0	2	0
15	DF	(Germany) GER	Tobias Fleckstein	26	2	20	2	6	0
17	DF	(Germany) GER	Marvin Knoll	21	0	19	0	2	0
17	MF	(Germany) GER	Caspar Jander	11	0	10	0	1	0
19	FW	(Germany) GER	Chinedu Ekene	3	0	3	0	0	0
20	MF	(Germany) GER	Marvin Ajani	38	5	33	3	5	2
21	DF	(Venezuela) VEN	Rolf Feltscher	30	0	28	0	2	0
22	MF	(Germany) GER	Rudolf Ndualu	4	1	3	0	1	1
23	MF	(Germany) GER	Niclas Stierlin	39	0	33	0	6	0
24	GK	(Germany) GER	Roman Schabbing	0	0	0	0	0	0
26	DF	(Germany) GER	Vincent Gembalies	25	0	21	0	4	0
27	DF	(Germany) GER	Niko Bretschneider	32	1	29	1	3	0
28	DF	(Germany) GER	Oliver Steurer	27	1	24	1	3	0
29	FW	(Switzerland) SUI	Orhan Ademi	42	17	36	12	6	5
30	GK	(Belgium) BEL	Jo Coppens	9	0	4	0	5	0
37	MF	(Germany) GER	Marlon Frey	41	4	35	1	6	3
39	FW	(Germany) GER	John Yeboah	19	2	17	0	2	2
	MF	(Romania) ROU	Darius Ghindovean†	14	1	11	0	3	1
	DF	(Germany) GER	Maximilian Sauer†	0	0	0	0	0	0
	DF	(Germany) GER	Dominik Schmidt†	2	0	1	0	1	0

Last updated: 14 May 2022
Source: Soccerway

^{†} Player left during the season

=== Goals ===
Rank	Player	3. Liga	LR Cup	Total
1	(Germany) Orhan Ademi	12	5	17
2	(Germany) Moritz Stoppelkamp	10	3	13
3	(Morocco) Aziz Bouhaddouz	9	2	11
4	(Germany) Marvin Ajani	3	2	5
4	(Germany) Kolja Pusch	4	1	5
6	(Germany) Alaa Bakir	2	2	4
6	(Germany) Marlon Frey	1	3	4
8	(Germany) Tobias Fleckstein	2	0	2
8	(Germany) Julian Hettwer	1	1	2
8	(Germany) John Yeboah	0	2	2
11	(Germany) Niko Bretschneider	1	0	1
11	(Romania) Darius Ghindovean	0	1	1
11	(Germany) Rudolf Ndualu	0	1	1
11	(Germany) Oliver Steurer	1	0	1
Own goals		2	0	2
Total		46	23	69

=== Clean sheets ===
Rank	Player	3. Liga	LR Cup	Total
1	(Germany) Leo Weinkauf	8	0	8
2	(Belgium) Jo Coppens	1	1	2
Total		9	1	10

=== Disciplinary record ===
N	P	Nat.	Name	3. Liga			LR Cup			Total			Notes
N	P	Nat.	Name	Yellow card	Second yellow card	Red card	Yellow card	Second yellow card	Red card	Yellow card	Second yellow card	Red card	Notes
6	MF	(Germany)	Marvin Bakalorz	6		1				6		1	
1	GK	(Germany)	Leo Weinkauf			1						1	
21	DF	(Venezuela)	Rolf Feltscher	10						10			
27	DF	(Germany)	Niko Bretschneider	9			1			10			
7	MF	(Germany)	Kolja Pusch	8			1			9			
9	MF	(Germany)	Alaa Bakir	9						9			
5	DF	(Germany)	Leroy Kwadwo	8						8			
23	MF	(Germany)	Niclas Stierlin	6						6			
10	MF	(Germany)	Moritz Stoppelkamp	4			1			5			
11	FW	(Morocco)	Aziz Bouhaddouz	5						5			
20	MF	(Germany)	Marvin Ajani	5						5			
26	DF	(Germany)	Vincent Gembalies	5						5			
15	DF	(Germany)	Tobias Fleckstein	3			1			4			
17	MF	(Germany)	Marvin Knoll	4						4			
28	DF	(Germany)	Oliver Steurer	4						4			
37	MF	(Germany)	Marlon Frey	4						4			
8	MF	(Romania)	Darius Ghindovean	3						3			
14	DF	(Bulgaria)	Stefan Velkov	2			1			3			
29	FW	(Germany)	Orhan Ademi	3						3			
13	FW	(Germany)	Julian Hettwer	2						2			
1	GK	(Germany)	Leo Weinkauf	1						1			
18	MF	(Germany)	Caspar Jander	1						1			
39	FW	(Germany)	John Yeboah	1						1			

Last updated: 14 May 2022
Source: Soccerway
Only competitive matches
(yellow card) = Number of bookings; (second yellow card) = Number of sending offs after a second yellow card; (red card) = Number of sending offs by a direct red card.
