= 2015–16 Burton Albion F.C. season =

Burton Albion
2015–16 season
- Chairman: Ben Robinson
- Manager: Jimmy Floyd Hasselbaink (until 4 December 2015); Nigel Clough (from 7 December 2015)
- Stadium: Pirelli Stadium
- League One: 2nd (promoted)
- FA Cup: First round (eliminated by Peterborough United)
- League Cup: Second round (eliminated by Middlesbrough)
- Football League Trophy: First round (eliminated by Doncaster Rovers)
- Highest home attendance: 5,512 vs Walsall (27 February 2016)
- Lowest home attendance: 2,517 vs Peterborough United (7 November 2015)
- Average home league attendance: 4,089

The 2015–16 season was Burton Albion's 66th season in their history and first ever in League One after gaining promotion the previous season. Along with League One, the club also took part in the FA Cup, League Cup and JP Trophy. The season covers the period from 1 July 2015 to 30 June 2016. By finishing 2nd and finishing in an automatic promotion zone, Burton achieved back-to-back promotion from League Two to the Championship.

== Competitions ==
=== Pre-season friendlies ===
On 19 May 2015, Burton Albion announced their full pre-season schedule. On 24 May 2015, Burton Albion confirmed their planned pre-season fixture against Benfica was cancelled due to the Portuguese club being invited to take part of the 2015 International Champions Cup. On 29 June 2015, Burton Albion confirmed details of their matches during the tour of the Netherlands.

1 July 2015 Friendly	Gresley	1–5	Burton Albion	Church Gresley
19:30 BST	Steadman 28'	Report	Knowles 47', 56', 58'; Thiele 73', 80'	Stadium: Moat Ground; Attendance: 630; Referee: Robert Hyde

4 July 2015 Friendly	Mickleover Sports	0–0	Burton Albion	Mickleover
15:00 BST		Report		Stadium: The Raygar Stadium; Attendance: 370

11 July 2015 Friendly	ADO Den Haag	0–1	Burton Albion	The Hague, Netherlands
17:00 BST		Report	Naylor 43'	Stadium: Laakkwartier Sportcomplex

18 July 2015 Friendly	Burton Albion	0–1	Wolverhampton Wanderers	Burton-upon-Trent
13:00 BST		Report	Dicko 10'	Stadium: Pirelli Stadium; Attendance: 2,702

25 July 2015 Friendly	Burton Albion	2–0	Birmingham City	Burton-upon-Trent
15:00 BST	Mousinho 52'; Edwards	Report		Stadium: Pirelli Stadium; Attendance: 3,393

28 July 2015 Friendly	Burton Albion	1–2	Leicester City	Burton-upon-Trent
19:30 BST	Duffy 90'	Report	Vardy 65', 70'	Stadium: Pirelli Stadium; Attendance: 3,184

1 August 2015 Friendly	Burton Albion	1–3	Derby County	Burton-upon-Trent
15:00 BST	Thiele	Report	Bent; Weimann; Russell	Stadium: Pirelli Stadium; Attendance: 5,302

=== League One ===
==== League table ====
Pos	Team	Pld	W	D	L	GF	GA	GD	Pts	Promotion, qualification or relegation
1	Wigan Athletic (C, P)	46	24	15	7	82	45	+37	87	Promotion to EFL Championship
2	Burton Albion (P)	46	25	10	11	57	37	+20	85	Promotion to EFL Championship
3	Walsall	46	24	12	10	71	49	+22	84	Qualification for the League One play-offs (Note: Four teams play for one spot and promotion to Football League Championship.)
4	Millwall	46	24	9	13	73	49	+24	81	Qualification for the League One play-offs
5	Bradford City	46	23	11	12	55	40	+15	80	Qualification for the League One play-offs

Updated to match(es) played on 1 July 2016. Source: BBC Sport
Rules for classification: 1) Points; 2) Goal difference; 3) Number of goals scored
(C) Champions; (P) Promoted

==== Matches ====
On 17 June 2015, the fixtures for the forthcoming season were announced.

8 August 2015 1	Burton Albion	2–1	Scunthorpe United	Burton upon Trent
15:00 BST	Beavon 55'; Akins 72' (pen.)	Report	Goode 90'	Stadium: Pirelli Stadium; Attendance: 4,064; Referee: Kevin Wright

15 August 2015 2	Barnsley	1–0	Burton Albion	Barnsley
15:00 BST	Hourihane 67' (pen.)	Report		Stadium: Oakwell; Attendance: 8,583; Referee: Jeremy Simpson

18 August 2015 3	Blackpool	1–2	Burton Albion	Blackpool
19:45 BST	Redshaw 26'	Report	El Khayati 58', 85'	Stadium: Bloomfield Road; Attendance: 6,197; Referee: Geoff Eltringham

22 August 2015 4	Burton Albion	2–1	Peterborough United	Burton upon Trent
15:00 BST	El Khayati 36'; Beavon 54'	Report	Maddison 67'; Zakuani (red card) 58'	Stadium: Pirelli Stadium; Attendance: 3,407; Referee: Graham Salisbury

29 August 2015 5	Shrewsbury Town	0–1	Burton Albion	Shrewsbury
15:00 BST		Report	Duffy 90'	Stadium: New Meadow; Attendance: 4,780; Referee: Mark Haywood

6 September 2015 6	Burton Albion	1–2	Coventry City	Burton upon Trent
14:30 BST	Martin 11' (o.g.)	Report	Tudgay 20'; Vincelot 56'	Stadium: Pirelli Stadium; Attendance: 4,633; Referee: Peter Bankes

12 September 2015 7	Burton Albion	1–0	Rochdale	Burton upon Trent
15:00 BST	Beavon 34'	Report		Stadium: Pirelli Stadium; Attendance: 2,787; Referee: Carl Boyeson

19 September 2015 8	Swindon Town	0–1	Burton Albion	Swindon
15:00 BST		Report	Beavon 27'	Stadium: County Ground; Attendance: 7,005; Referee: Scott Duncan

26 September 2015 9	Chesterfield	1–2	Burton Albion	Chesterfield
15:00 BST	Hird 2'	Report	Beavon 46'; Binnom-Williams 90'	Stadium: Proact Stadium; Attendance: 6,762; Referee: David Webb

29 September 2015 10	Burton Albion	0–0	Sheffield United	Burton upon Trent
19:45 BST		Report		Stadium: Pirelli Stadium; Attendance: 5,029; Referee: Chris Kavanagh

3 October 2015 11	Burton Albion	1–0	Southend United	Burton upon Trent
15:00 BST	Prosser 51' (o.g.)	Report		Stadium: Pirelli Stadium; Attendance: 2,948; Referee: Trevor Kettle

10 October 2015 12	Walsall	2–0	Burton Albion	Walsall
15:00 BST	Kinsella 36'; Bradshaw 90+2' (pen.)	Report		Stadium: Bescot Stadium; Attendance: 6,812; Referee: Tim Robinson

17 October 2015 13	Fleetwood Town	4–0	Burton Albion	Fleetwood
15:00 BST	Procter 42'; Grant 58' 71'; Hunter 80'	Report		Stadium: Highbury Stadium; Attendance: 2,893; Referee: Darren Bond

20 October 2015 14	Burton Albion	0–0	Crewe Alexandra	Burton upon Trent
19:45 BST		Report		Stadium: Pirelli Stadium; Attendance: 2,666; Referee: Seb Stockbridge

24 October 2015 15	Burton Albion	2–0	Port Vale	Burton upon Trent
15:00 BST	Naylor 84'; Weir (red card) 80'; El Khayati 90'	Report	Ikpeazu (yellow card) 20' (yellow-red card)	Stadium: Pirelli Stadium; Attendance: 4,076; Referee: David Coote

31 October 2015 16	Oldham Athletic	0–1	Burton Albion	Oldham
15:00 GMT		Report	El Khayati 17'	Stadium: Boundary Park; Attendance: 3,795; Referee: Eddie Ilderton

21 November 2015 17	Bury	1–0	Burton Albion	Bury
15:00 GMT	Dodoo 40'	Report		Stadium: Gigg Lane; Attendance: 3,788; Referee: Andy Haines

24 November 2015 18	Wigan	0–1	Burton Albion	Wigan
19:45 GMT		Report	El Khayati 74'	Stadium: DW Stadium; Attendance: 8,117; Referee: Mark Haywood

28 November 2015 19	Burton Albion	5–1	Colchester United	Burton upon Trent
15:00 GMT	El Khayati 25'; Duffy 34'; Naylor 51'; Akins 72'; Thiele 81'	Report	Harriott 4'	Stadium: Pirelli Stadium; Attendance: 2,893; Referee: Ben Toner

1 December 2015 20	Burton Albion	2–1	Millwall	Burton Upon Trent
19:45 GMT	McCrory 35'; El Khayati 42'	Report	J. Martin 75'	Stadium: Pirelli Stadium; Attendance: 2,888; Referee: Oliver Langford

12 December 2015 21	Gillingham	0–3	Burton Albion	Gillingham
15:00 GMT		Report	McCrory 59'; Akins 90'; O'Connor 90+6'	Stadium: Priestfield Stadium; Attendance: 6,230; Referee: Andy Woolmer

19 December 2015 22	Burton Albion	3–3	Doncaster Rovers	Burton Upon Trent
15:00 GMT	Butcher 18', 61'; Duffy 89'	Report	Williams 4'; Keegan 70'; Tyson 83' (pen.)	Stadium: Pirelli Stadium; Attendance: 4,103; Referee: Mark Heywood

26 December 2015 Postponed	Bradford City	P–P	Burton Albion	Bradford
15:00 GMT		Report		Stadium: Valley Parade

28 December 2015 23	Burton Albion	1–0	Swindon Town	Burton Upon Trent
15:00 GMT	Duffy (yellow card) 45'; Naylor (yellow card) 73'; Akins 77' (pen.)	Report	El-Abd (yellow card) 59'; Thompson (yellow card) 63'; Barry (yellow card) 90+3'	Stadium: Pirelli Stadium; Attendance: 4,816; Referee: (England) Mark Brown

2 January 2016 24	Burton Albion	1–0	Blackpool	Burton Upon Trent
15:00 GMT	Weir (yellow card) 41' (yellow-red card); Duffy 63'	Report	Aimson (yellow card) 30'; Aldred (yellow card) 61'	Stadium: Pirelli Stadium; Attendance: 4,339; Referee: (England) Richard Clark

16 January 2016 25	Coventry City	0–2	Burton Albion	Coventry
15:00 GMT	Fleck (yellow card) 55'; Vincelot (yellow card) 55'	Report	Mousinho (yellow card) 25'; Butcher 49'; Cansdell-Sherriff (yellow card) 70'; Beavon 72'	Stadium: Ricoh Arena; Attendance: 17,140; Referee: (England) Andre Marriner

23 January 2016 26	Burton Albion	1–2	Shrewsbury Town	Burton Upon Trent
15:00 GMT	McCrory 18' (yellow card) 80'; Naylor (yellow card) 72'	Report	Mangan 52'; Whitbread (yellow card) 54'; Whalley 90+3'; Leutwiler (yellow card) 90+5'	Stadium: Pirelli Stadium; Attendance: 3,870; Referee: (England) Graham Salisbury

26 January 2016 27	Peterborough United	0–1	Burton Albion	Peterborough
19:45 GMT	Baldwin (yellow card) 68'; Samuelson (yellow card) 73'	Report	Naylor 3'; Weir (yellow card) 60'	Stadium: London Road Stadium; Attendance: 4,798; Referee: (England) Tim Robinson

30 January 2016 28	Rochdale	2–1	Burton Albion	Rochdale
15:00 GMT	Camps 8'; Henderson 24' (pen.)	Report	Akins 78'	Stadium: Spotland Stadium; Attendance: 2,994; Referee: (England) Stuart Attwell

6 February 2016 29	Burton Albion	3–1	Bradford City	Burton Upon Trent
15:00 GMT	Bennett 17'; Tom Naylor 73'; Duffy 77'	Report	Tony McMahon (yellow card) 37'; McArdle 90+2'	Stadium: Pirelli Stadium; Attendance: 3,796; Referee: Nick Kinseley

12 February 2016 30	Burton Albion	1–0	Chesterfield	Burton Upon Trent
19:45 GMT	Butcher 45+1'	Report	Herd (yellow card) 51'; Anderson (yellow card) 54'; Banks (yellow card) 89'	Stadium: Pirelli Stadium; Attendance: 4,489; Referee: (England) Simon Hooper

22 February 2016 31	Southend United	3–1	Burton Albion	Southend-on-Sea
19:45 GMT	Wordsworth 7'; Barnett 63'; Mooney 90+1'	Report	Beavon 44'	Stadium: Roots Hall; Attendance: 6,503; Referee: (England) Paul Tierney (referee)

27 February 2016 32	Burton Albion	0–0	Walsall	Burton Upon Trent
15:00 GMT		Report	Downing (yellow card) 81'	Stadium: Pirelli Stadium; Attendance: 5,512; Referee: James Adcock

1 March 2016 33	Sheffield United	0–1	Burton Albion	Sheffield
19:45 GMT	Coutts (yellow card) 38'; Edgar (yellow card) 75'	Report	Akins 49'; Mousinho (yellow card) 28'	Stadium: Bramall Lane; Attendance: 17,927; Referee: (England) Seb Stockbridge

5 March 2016 34	Crewe Alexandra	1–1	Burton Albion	Crewe
15:00 GMT	Haber 14'; Turton (yellow card) 32'; Jones (yellow card) 70'; Ng (yellow card) 80'; Nugent (yellow card) 87'	Report	Akins 35'; McCrory (yellow card) 90+1'	Stadium: Alexandra Stadium; Attendance: 4,380; Referee: (England) Peter Bankes

8 March 2016 35	Bradford City	2–0	Burton Albion	Bradford
19:45 GMT	Reid 13'; Burke 28'; Meredith (yellow card) 83'	Report	McCrory (yellow card) 16'; Edwards (yellow card) 26'; Beavon (yellow card) 73'	Stadium: Coral Windows Stadium; Attendance: 17,500; Referee: (England) Trevor Kettle

12 March 2016 36	Burton Albion	2–1	Fleetwood Town	Burton Upon Trent
15:00 GMT	Duffy 26' 63'	Report	Burns 47'; Ameobi (yellow card) 50'; Nilsson (yellow card) 53'; Grant (red card) 67'	Stadium: Pirelli Stadium; Attendance: 4,415; Referee: (England) Oliver Langford

19 March 2016 37	Port Vale	0–4	Burton Albion	Stoke-on-Trent
15:00 GMT	Duffy (yellow card) 45'	Report	Akins 34'; Grant 45+1' (o.g.); Duffy 50'; Butcher 60'	Stadium: Vale Park; Attendance: 6,157; Referee: (England) Eddie Ilderton

26 March 2016 38	Burton Albion	0–0	Oldham Athletic	Burton Upon Trent
12:30 GMT	Flanagan (yellow card) 5'; Choudhury (yellow card) 31'	Report	Main (yellow card) 79'	Stadium: Pirelli Stadium; Attendance: 4,283; Referee: (England) Geoff Eltringham

28 March 2016 39	Millwall	2–0	Burton Albion	London
19:45 GMT	O'Brien 12'; Gregory 18'; Thompson (yellow card) 21'; Beevers (yellow card) 74'; Martin (yellow card) 85'; Romeo (yellow card) 90+3'	Report	Mousinho (yellow card) 22'; Beavon (yellow card) 42'; Butcher (yellow card) 75'	Stadium: The Den; Attendance: 8,012; Referee: (England) Keith Stroud

2 April 2016 40	Burton Albion	1–1	Bury	Burton Upon Trent
15:00 GMT	Choudhury (yellow card) 60' (yellow-red card); Mousinho (yellow card) 72'; Walker 90+2'	Report	Bolger (yellow card) 23'; O'Sullivan (yellow card) 27'; Pugh (yellow card) 53'; Lowe 74' (yellow card) 88'	Stadium: Pirelli Stadium; Attendance: 3,331; Referee: (England) Ross Joyce

9 April 2016 41	Scunthorpe United	1–0	Burton Albion	Scunthorpe
15:00 GMT	Bishop 60'; Madden (yellow card) 90+1'	Report	Harness (yellow card) 90'	Stadium: Glanford Park; Attendance: 3,888; Referee: (England) Andy Haines

16 April 2016 42	Burton Albion	0–0	Barnsley	Burton Upon Trent
15:00 GMT	Flanagan (yellow card) 57'; Edwards (yellow card) 89'; Choudhury (yellow card) 90+3'	Report		Stadium: Pirelli Stadium; Attendance: 4,858; Referee: (England) Andrew Davies

19 April 2016 43	Burton Albion	1–1	Wigan Athletic	Burton Upon Trent
19:45 GMT	Edwards (yellow card) 8'; Akins (yellow card) 17'; Naylor 38' (yellow card) 55'; Reilly (yellow card) 90'	Report	Jacobs 8'; McCann (yellow card) 81'; Power (yellow card) 85'	Stadium: Pirelli Stadium; Attendance: 5,461; Referee: (England) Simon Hooper

23 April 2016 44	Colchester United	0–3	Burton Albion	Colchester
15:00 GMT	Edwards (red card) 17'	Report	Akins 45', 49', 60'	Stadium: Weston Homes Community Stadium; Attendance: 4,292

30 April 2016 45	Burton Albion	2–1	Gillingham	Burton Upon Trent
15:00 GMT	Akins 44'; Naylor 90+2'	Report	McDonald 49'	Stadium: Pirelli Stadium; Attendance: 5,388; Referee: Tony Harrington

8 May 2016 46	Doncaster Rovers	0–0	Burton Albion	Doncaster
12:30 GMT		Report	Choudhury (yellow card) 76'	Stadium: Keepmoat Stadium; Attendance: 9,803; Referee: (England) Andy Woolmer

=== FA Cup ===
7 November 2015 First round	Burton Albion	0–3	Peterborough United	Burton upon Trent
15:00 GMT	Edwards (red card) 90+5'	Report	Washington 41', 71'; J. Anderson 84'	Stadium: Pirelli Stadium; Attendance: 2,517; Referee: David Webb

=== League Cup ===
On 16 June 2015, the first round draw was made, Burton Albion were drawn away against Bolton Wanderers. In the second round, Burton Albion were handed a home tie against Middlesbrough.

11 August 2015 First round	Bolton Wanderers	0–1	Burton Albion	Bolton
20:00 BST		Report	Palmer 87'	Stadium: Macron Stadium; Attendance: 5,842; Referee: Richard Clark

25 August 2015 Second round	Burton Albion	1–2 (a.e.t.)	Middlesbrough	Burton upon Trent
19:45 BST	Friend 24' (o.g.)	Report	Stuani 70', 109'	Stadium: Pirelli Stadium; Attendance: 3,414; Referee: Mark Brown

=== Football League Trophy ===
On 8 August 2015, live on Soccer AM the draw for the first round of the Football League Trophy was drawn by Toni Duggan and Alex Scott. Burton will travel to Doncaster Rovers.

1 September 2015 First round	Doncaster Rovers	0–0 (5–3 p)	Burton Albion	Doncaster
19:45 BST		Report		Stadium: Keepmoat Stadium; Attendance: 2,956; Referee: Ross Joyce
	Penalties
	Williams (penalty scored); Main (penalty scored); Middleton (penalty scored); Chaplow (penalty scored); Stewart (penalty scored)		Akins (penalty scored); Reilly (penalty scored); Naylor (penalty missed); Binnom-Williams (penalty scored)

=== Birmingham Senior Cup ===
On the Birmingham FA website details of the first round was released, Burton will face Boldmere St. Michaels.

6 October 2015 First round	Boldmere St. Michaels	2–4	Burton Albion	Boldmere
19:30 BST				Stadium: Trevor Brown Memorial Ground

15 December 2015 Second round	Bedworth United	0–6	Burton Albion	Bedworth
19:45 BST				Stadium: The Oval Ground

19 January 2016 Quarter Final	Nuneaton Town	4–3	Burton Albion	Nuneaton
19:45 BST	Harewood; Callum Chettle; James Clifton	Report	Joachim 7' 50'; Harness 12'	Stadium: Liberty Way; Attendance: 252

== Transfers ==
=== Transfers in ===
Date from	Position	Nationality	Name	From	Fee	Ref.
1 July 2015	CB	ENG	Calum Butcher	Dundee United	Free transfer	
1 July 2015	CB	ENG	Darius Charles	Stevenage	Free transfer	
1 July 2015	CB	ENG	Tom Naylor	Derby County	Free transfer	
1 July 2015	CM	IRL	Callum Reilly	Birmingham City	Free transfer	
1 July 2015	CF	GER	Timmy Thiele	SC Wiedenbrück	Free transfer	
18 July 2015	CB	IRL	Anthony O'Connor	Plymouth Argyle	Free transfer	
5 August 2015	CF	LUX	Aurélien Joachim	CSKA Sofia	Free transfer	
25 August 2015	DF	ENG	Tom Flanagan	MK Dons	Free transfer	
2 December 2015	MF	ENG	Nathan Ferguson	Grays Athletic	Free transfer	
13 January 2016	GK	ENG	Stephen Bywater	Unattached	Free transfer	

=== Transfers out ===
Date from	Position	Nationality	Name	To	Fee	Ref.
1 July 2015	CF	GPE	Mickaël Antoine-Curier	Free agent	Released	
1 July 2015	CM	ENG	Lee Bell	Free agent	Released	
1 July 2015	RB	ENG	Joe Doyle	Free agent	Released	
1 July 2015	CB	NED	Stefan Maletić	Free agent	Released	
1 July 2015	CF	NIR	Adam McGurk	Portsmouth	Free transfer	
1 July 2015	LM	ENG	Jimmy Phillips	Gateshead (Note: Following Phillips' release on 5 May 2015, he later signed for Gateshead on 7 July 2015.)	Free transfer	
1 July 2015	CB	ENG	Ian Sharps	Chester (Note: Following Sharp's release on 5 May 2015, he later signed for Chester on 1 July 2015.)	Free transfer	
21 July 2015	CF	ENG	Dominic Knowles	Harrogate Town	Undisclosed	
1 February 2016	FW	NED	Nasser El Khayati	Queens Park Rangers	Undisclosed	

=== Loans in ===
Date from	Position	Nationality	Name	From	Date until	Ref.
3 July 2015	RM	ENG	Mark Duffy	Birmingham City	2 January 2016	
6 July 2015	GK	ENG	Remi Matthews	Norwich City	5 January 2016	
29 July 2015	RM	ALB	Zeli Ismail	Wolverhampton Wanderers	29 January 2016	
30 July 2015	LB	ENG	Jerome Binnom-Williams	Crystal Palace	End of season	
15 January 2016	CF	ENG	Mason Bennett	Derby County	End of season	
24 March 2016	FW	ENG	Tyler Walker	Nottingham Forest	End of season	

=== Loans out ===
Date from	Position	Nationality	Name	To	Date until	Ref.
31 July 2015	LB	ENG	George Taft	Cambridge United	9 January 2016	
7 August 2015	RM	ENG	Marcus Harness	Ilkeston	4 September 2015	
12 November 2015	GK	ENG	Dean Lyness	Blackpool	2 January 2016	
22 January 2016	MF	ENG	Matt Palmer	Oldham Athletic	27 February 2016	
13 February 2016	GK	ENG	Dean Lyness	Blackpool	22 March 2016	
11 March 2016	FW	GER	Timmy Thiele	Oldham Athletic	End of season	
17 March 2016	DF	ENG	Darius Charles	AFC Wimbledon	End of season	
