= Timmy Thiele =

German footballer

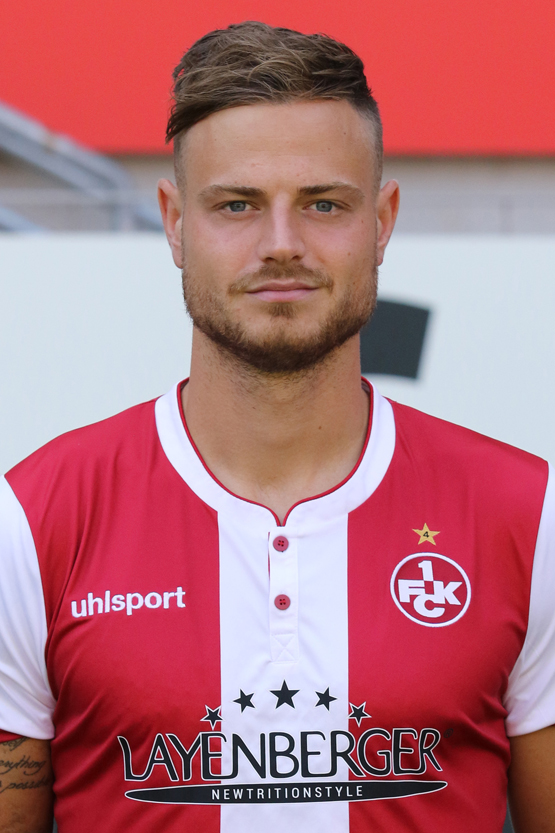
- Thiele with 1. FC Kaiserslautern in July 2018

Personal information
- Full name: Timmy Dennis Mario Thiele
- Date of birth: 31 July 1991 (age 35)
- Place of birth: Berlin, Germany
- Height: 1.88 m (6 ft 2 in)
- Position: Forward

Youth career
- 1997–2001: Tennis Borussia Berlin
- 2001–2002: TSV Rudow 1888
- 2002–2007: Hertha BSC
- 2007–2008: SV Tasmania Gropiusstadt 73
- 2008–2009: Tennis Borussia Berlin
- 2009–2010: Werder Bremen

Senior career*
Years	Team	Apps	(Gls)
2009–2011	Werder Bremen II	17	(0)
2011–2012	Schalke 04 II	8	(0)
2012–2013	Alemannia Aachen	29	(5)
2013–2015	Borussia Dortmund II	7	(2)
2015	→ SC Wiedenbrück 2000 (loan)	7	(2)
2015–2016	Burton Albion	22	(1)
2016	→ Oldham Athletic (loan)	3	(0)
2016–2018	Carl Zeiss Jena	53	(25)
2018–2020	1. FC Kaiserslautern	70	(17)
2020–2022	Viktoria Köln	43	(9)
2023–2026	Energie Cottbus	98	(27)
- * Club domestic league appearances and goals as of 28 May 2026

Timmy Dennis Mario Thiele (born 31 July 1991) is a German professional footballer who plays as a forward.

== Career ==
Thiele scored his first goal for Burton Albion in a 5–1 win over Colchester United on 28 November 2015. He joined Oldham Athletic on loan in March 2016. He was released by Burton Albion at the end of the 2015–16 season.

During the summer of 2016 he joined Regionalliga Nordost side FC Carl Zeiss Jena.

In June 2018, Thiele left Jena for league rivals 1. FC Kaiserslautern. The transfer fee paid to Jena was reported as €400,000 plus possible bonuses.

Thiele moved to FC Viktoria Köln in August 2020.

== Career statistics ==
As of matches played 24 August 2020.

Appearances and goals by club, season and competition
Club	Season	League			Cup (Note: Appearances in the German FA Cup and English FA Cup.)		Other		Total	
Club	Season	Division	Apps	Goals	Apps	Goals	Apps	Goals	Apps	Goals
Werder Bremen II	2009–10	3. Liga	1	0	—		—		1	0
Werder Bremen II	2010–11	3. Liga	16	0	—		—		16	0
Werder Bremen II	Total		17	0	—		—		17	0
Schalke 04 II	2011–12	Regionalliga West	8	0	—		—		8	0
Alemannia Aachen	2012–13	3. Liga	29	5	1	0	—		30	5
Borussia Dortmund II	2013–14	3. Liga	7	2	—		—		7	2
SC Wiedenbrück 2000 (loan)	2014–15	Regionalliga West	7	2	—		—		7	2
Burton Albion	2015–16	League One	22	1	1	0	2 (Note: Appearances in the English League Cup.)	0	25	1
Oldham Athletic (loan)	2015–16	League One	4	0	0	0	—		4	0
Carl Zeiss Jena II	2016–17	NOFV-Oberliga Süd	1	0	—		—		1	0
Carl Zeiss Jena	2016–17	Regionalliga Nordost	31	14	1	0	2 (Note: Appearances in the Promotion playoff.)	2	34	16
Carl Zeiss Jena	2017–18	3. Liga	22	11	—		—		22	11
Carl Zeiss Jena	Total		53	25	1	0	2	2	56	27
1. FC Kaiserslautern	2018–19	3. Liga	37	7	1	0	0	0	38	7
1. FC Kaiserslautern	2019–20	3. Liga	33	10	3	2	0	0	36	12
1. FC Kaiserslautern	Total		70	17	4	2	0	0	64	19
Career total			219	52	6	2	4	2	229	56
