= Assauer =

Assauer is a surname. Notable people with the surname include:

- Jerome Assauer (born 1988), German footballer
- Rudi Assauer (1944–2019), German football player and executive
