= Niko Bretschneider =

German footballer

Personal information
- Date of birth: 10 August 1999 (age 27)
- Place of birth: Berlin, Germany
- Height: 1.81 m (5 ft 11 in)
- Position: Left-back

Team information
- Current team: 1. FC Saarbrücken
- Number: 28

Youth career
- –2015: Hertha BSC
- 2015–2017: Tennis Borussia Berlin
- 2017–2018: Hertha Zehlendorf

Senior career*
Years	Team	Apps	(Gls)
2018	Hertha Zehlendorf	1	(0)
2018–2020	Hertha BSC II	30	(1)
2020–2022	MSV Duisburg	36	(1)
2022–2023	FK Auda	46	(1)
2024–2025	Energie Cottbus	48	(0)
2025–	1. FC Saarbrücken	26	(1)
- * Club domestic league appearances and goals as of 30 May 2026

Niko Bretschneider (born 10 August 1999) is a German professional footballer who plays as a left-back for 3. Liga club 1. FC Saarbrücken.

== Career ==
In the summer of 2020, Bretschneider moved to MSV Duisburg. He made his professional debut for MSV Duisburg in the first round of the 2020–21 DFB-Pokal on 14 September 2020, starting in the home match against Bundesliga side Borussia Dortmund. He made his 3. Liga debut in a 1–1 draw against FSV Zwickau on 26 September 2020. He left Duisburg in the summer of 2022 and joined FK Auda.

On 27 June 2025, Bretschneider moved to 1. FC Saarbrücken.

== Career statistics ==
As of 14 May 2022

Appearances and goals by club, season and competition
Club	Season	Division	League		Cup		Continental		Total	
Club	Season	Division	Apps	Goals	Apps	Goals	Apps	Goals	Apps	Goals
Hertha Zehlendorf	2017–18	NOFV-Oberliga Nord	1	0	—		—		1	0
Hertha BSC II	2018–19	Regionalliga Nordost	10	0	—		—		10	0
Hertha BSC II	2019–20	Regionalliga Nordost	20	1	—		—		20	1
Hertha BSC II	Total		30	1	0	0	—		30	1
MSV Duisburg	2020–21	3. Liga	7	0	1	0	—		8	0
MSV Duisburg	2021–22	3. Liga	27	1	—		—		27	1
MSV Duisburg	Total		36	1	1	0	—		37	1
Career total			67	2	1	0	—		68	2
