= Sören Eismann =

German footballer

Personal information
- Full name: Sören Eismann
- Date of birth: 28 June 1988 (age 38)
- Place of birth: Rudolstadt, East Germany
- Height: 1.88 m (6 ft 2 in)
- Position: Midfielder

Team information
- Current team: TSV Steinbach
- Number: 33

Youth career
- 2005–2006: Einheit Rudolstadt
- 2006–2007: Holstein Kiel

Senior career*
Years	Team	Apps	(Gls)
2007–2008	Holstein Kiel	0	(0)
2008	→ TuS Heeslingen (loan)	12	(0)
2008–2009	Carl Zeiss Jena II	50	(2)
2009–2011	Carl Zeiss Jena	27	(0)
2011–2013	Hallescher FC	51	(1)
2013–2019	Carl Zeiss Jena II	53	(2)
2013–2019	Carl Zeiss Jena	137	(10)
2019–	TSV Steinbach	19	(0)
- * Club domestic league appearances and goals as of 1 August 2020

Sören Eismann (born 28 June 1988) is a German professional footballer who plays for TSV Steinbach, as a midfielder.

He became internationally famous for scoring a ruthlessly opportunistic goal against Meppen on 16 September 2017, stealing the ball off a player who intended to stop play to take care of an injured Jena player.

== Career ==
Eismann made his professional debut in the 3. Liga against 1. FC Heidenheim 1846 on 24 July 2010, as a substitute for Tobias Kurbjuweit.

== Controversy ==
On 16 September 2017, during a 3. Liga match between his side Carl Zeiss Jena and SV Meppen, Eismann scored a controversial goal, after he ignored appeals for stopping the game as his own teammate was lying on the field, after colliding with an adversary. Eismann's teammate, Julian Guenther-Schmidt, went down after a challenge and raised his hand in apparent pain, prompting Meppen midfielder Nico Granatowski to stop the ball as if to kick it out of play so the Jena forward could get attention. But Eismann got the ball, burst forward, and scored while the Meppen players stood around, seemingly expecting the ball to be sent out of play. The goal was given amid heated discussion and pushing and shoving among rival players. To add insult to injury, Eismann salvaged a draw with a late equaliser.
