= Oliver Steurer =

German footballer (born 1995)

Personal information
- Date of birth: 6 January 1995 (age 31)
- Place of birth: Gelsenkirchen, Germany
- Height: 1.91 m (6 ft 3 in)
- Position: Centre-back

Team information
- Current team: SV Ried
- Number: 30

Youth career
- 1999–2008: SV Heßler 06
- 2008–2009: Borussia Dortmund
- 2009–2011: Schalke 04
- 2011–2014: Rot-Weiss Essen

Senior career*
Years	Team	Apps	(Gls)
2014–2015	Schwarz-Weiß Essen	33	(1)
2015–2017	Rot-Weiß Oberhausen	47	(1)
2015–2016	Rot-Weiß Oberhausen II	15	(1)
2017–2018	Borussia Dortmund II	17	(2)
2018–2021	1. FC Heidenheim	19	(0)
2019–2020	→ Uerdingen 05	5	(0)
2020	→ Preußen Münster	16	(0)
2021–2022	MSV Duisburg	23	(1)
2022–2023	VfB Oldenburg	37	(2)
2023–	SV Ried	87	(6)
- * Club domestic league appearances and goals as of 10 June 2026

Oliver Steurer (born 6 January 1995) is a German professional footballer who plays as a centre-back for Austrian club SV Ried.

== Career ==
After spending three years at 1. FC Heidenheim, he moved to MSV Duisburg in the summer of 2021. He left Duisburg in the summer of 2022. He moved to VfB Oldenburg afterwards on 1 July 2022.

On 15 August 2023, Steurer signed for Austrian club SV Ried on a two-year contract.

== Career statistics ==
As of 14 May 2022

Appearances and goals by club, season and competition
Club	Season	Division	League		Cup		Other		Total	
Club	Season	Division	Apps	Goals	Apps	Goals	Apps	Goals	Apps	Goals
Schwarz-Weiß Essen	2014–15	Oberliga Niederrhein	33	1	—		—		33	1
Rot-Weiß Oberhausen	2015–16	Regionalliga West	20	0	—		—		20	0
Rot-Weiß Oberhausen	2016–17	Regionalliga West	27	1	—		—		27	1
Rot-Weiß Oberhausen	Total		47	1	—		—		47	1
Rot-Weiß Oberhausen II	2015–16	Oberliga Niederrhein	15	1	—		—		15	1
Borussia Dortmund II	2017–18	Regionalliga West	17	2	—		—		17	2
1. FC Heidenheim	2017–18	2. Bundesliga	5	0	—		—		5	0
1. FC Heidenheim	2018–19	2. Bundesliga	4	0	—		—		4	0
1. FC Heidenheim	2020–21	2. Bundesliga	10	0	1	0	—		11	0
1. FC Heidenheim	Total		19	0	1	0	—		20	0
KFC Uerdingen (loan)	2019–20	3. Liga	5	0	—		—		5	0
Preußen Münster (loan)	2019–20	3. Liga	16	0	—		—		16	0
MSV Duisburg	2021–22	3. Liga	23	1	—		—		23	1
Career total			175	6	1	0	—		176	6
