= Dominik Bock =

German footballer

Personal information
- Date of birth: 20 January 1995 (age 31)
- Place of birth: Saalfeld, Germany
- Height: 1.82 m (6 ft 0 in)
- Position: Midfielder

Team information
- Current team: ZFC Meuselwitz
- Number: 7

Youth career
- VfL Saalfeld
- –2014: Carl Zeiss Jena

Senior career*
Years	Team	Apps	(Gls)
2013–2021	Carl Zeiss Jena	125	(20)
2014–2018	Carl Zeiss Jena II	29	(14)
2021–	ZFC Meuselwitz	44	(3)
- * Club domestic league appearances and goals as of 24 April 2024

Dominik Bock (born 20 January 1995) is a German footballer who plays as a midfielder for ZFC Meuselwitz.
