= Jo Coppens =

Belgian footballer (born 1990)

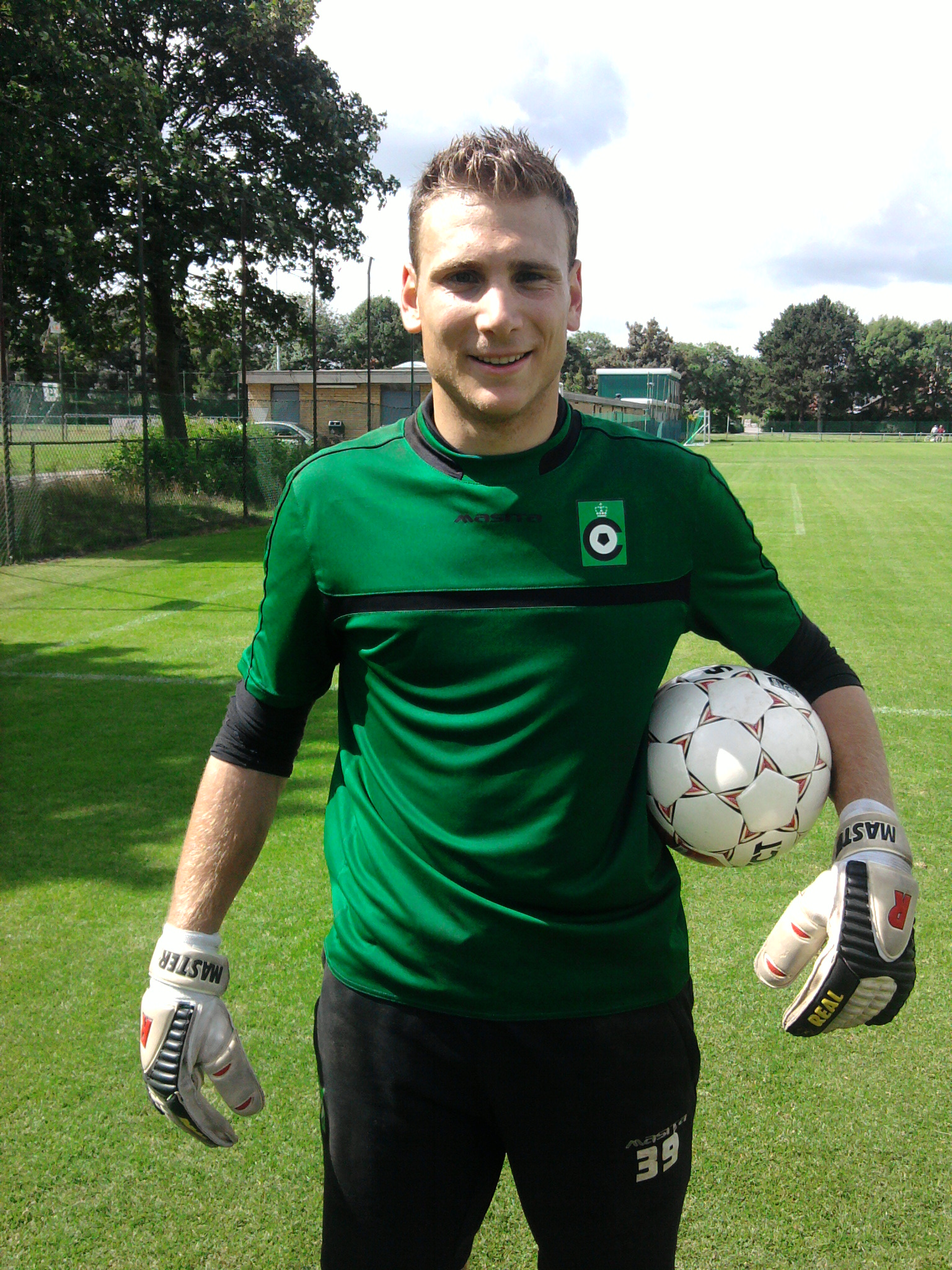
- Coppens in 2013

Personal information
- Date of birth: 21 December 1990 (age 35)
- Place of birth: Heusden-Zolder, Belgium
- Height: 1.90 m (6 ft 3 in)
- Position: Goalkeeper

Youth career
- FC Halveweg
- VV Zonhoven
- Heusden-Zolder
- Genk

Senior career*
Years	Team	Apps	(Gls)
2008–2014	Cercle Brugge	37	(0)
2014–2016	MVV Maastricht	68	(0)
2016–2017	Roeselare	5	(0)
2017–2020	Carl Zeiss Jena	73	(1)
2017–2020	Carl Zeiss Jena II	2	(0)
2020–2021	Lillestrøm	7	(0)
2021	SpVgg Unterhaching	17	(0)
2021–2022	MSV Duisburg	4	(0)
2022–2026	Sint-Truiden	12	(0)

International career
2006	Belgium U16	2	(0)
2006–2007	Belgium U17	13	(0)
2007–2008	Belgium U18	13	(0)
2008–2009	Belgium U19	10	(0)
- * Club domestic league appearances and goals as of 31 May 2026

Jo Coppens (born 21 December 1990) is a Belgian professional footballer who plays as a goalkeeper.

== Career ==
In May 2007, Coppens came third with Belgium at the European U17 Football Championship. In the summer of 2007, he was part of the Belgian squad at the U17 World Cup in South Korea. Coppens played all three matches. In the beginning of 2008, he came fourth with the Belgian U18 team at the international tournament of Saint Petersburg.

After running through the youth ranks of different Limburg sides, Coppens signed his first professional contract with Cercle Brugge. He started the season as third goalkeeper, behind Bram Verbist and Patrick Lane. When Verbist broke his wrist in the match against AA Gent, Coppens was given his chance for the last two matches of the season. He made his debut in a 2–1 win against Westerlo. In the summer of 2014, he was released and signed with Dutch side MVV Maastricht.

In 2018, while playing for Carl Zeiss Jena, he scored a goal from 80 metres, in a 4–2 win over Werder Bremen.

Coppens returned to Germany and the 3. Liga in January 2021, joining SpVgg Unterhaching on a contract until the end of the season.

In summer of 2021, he moved to MSV Duisburg. After one year, he moved along to Sint-Truiden.

== Career statistics ==
As of 24 June 2024

Appearances and goals by club, season and competition
Club	Season	Division	League		Cup		Other		Total	
Club	Season	Division	Apps	Goals	Apps	Goals	Apps	Goals	Apps	Goals
Cercle Brugge	2008–09	Belgian First Division	2	0	—		—		2	0
Cercle Brugge	2009–10	Belgian First Division	15	0	—		—		15	0
Cercle Brugge	2010–11	Belgian First Division	1	0	—		1 (Note: Appearance(s) in Europa League playoff)	0	2	0
Cercle Brugge	2011–12	Belgian First Division	8	0	—		9	0	17	0
Cercle Brugge	2012–13	Belgian First Division	11	0	—		—		11	0
Cercle Brugge	2013–14	Belgian First Division	0	0	—		2	0	2	0
Cercle Brugge	Total		37	0	—		12	0	49	0
MVV Maastricht	2014–15	Eerste Divisie	36	0	2	0	—		38	0
MVV Maastricht	2015–16	Eerste Divisie	32	0	—		4 (Note: Appearance(s) in relegation playoff)	0	36	0
MVV Maastricht	Total		68	0	2	0	4	0	74	0
Roeselare	2016–17	Belgian First Division B	5	0	1	0	4	0	10	0
Carl Zeiss Jena	2017–18	3. Liga	12	1	—		—		12	1
Carl Zeiss Jena	2018–19	3. Liga	29	0	1	0	—		30	0
Carl Zeiss Jena	2019–20	3. Liga	32	0	—		—		32	0
Carl Zeiss Jena	Total		73	1	1	0	—		74	1
Carl Zeiss Jena II	2017–18	NOFV-Oberliga Süd	2	0	—		—		2	0
Lillestrøm	2020	1. divisjon	7	0	—		—		7	0
SpVgg Unterhaching	2020–21	3. Liga	17	0	—		—		17	0
MSV Duisburg	2021–22	3. Liga	4	0	—		—		4	0
Career total			213	1	4	0	20	0	233	1
