= Janik Mäder =

German footballer

Personal information
- Date of birth: 27 September 1996 (age 30)
- Place of birth: Borna, Germany
- Height: 1.78 m (5 ft 10 in)
- Position: Midfielder

Team information
- Current team: Chemie Leipzig
- Number: 7

Youth career
- Bornaer SV
- –2010: Sachsen Leipzig
- 2010–2015: RB Leipzig

Senior career*
Years	Team	Apps	(Gls)
2015–2016	RB Leipzig II	19	(1)
2016–2018	ZFC Meuselwitz	62	(5)
2018–2020	FSV Zwickau	14	(0)
2020–2022	Energie Cottbus	30	(4)
2022–	Chemie Leipzig	115	(21)
- * Club domestic league appearances and goals as of 22 June 2026

Janik Mäder (born 27 September 1996) is a German professional footballer who plays as a midfielder for Chemie Leipzig.

== Club career ==
On 27 July 2020, Mäder joined FC Energie Cottbus.
