= Rudolf Ndualu =

German footballer (born 1999)

Personal information
- Full name: Rudolf Dovny Ndualu
- Date of birth: 22 July 1999 (age 27)
- Place of birth: Brandenburg an der Havel, Germany
- Height: 1.81 m (5 ft 11 in)
- Position: Midfielder

Team information
- Current team: Greifswalder FC
- Number: 22

Youth career
- –2016: Energie Cottbus
- 2016–2017: Tennis Borussia Berlin
- 2017–2018: Arminia Bielefeld

Senior career*
Years	Team	Apps	(Gls)
2016–2017	Tennis Borussia Berlin	5	(1)
2018–2020	Viktoria Berlin	20	(2)
2020–2021	Tennis Borussia Berlin	10	(4)
2021–2022	MSV Duisburg	3	(0)
2022–2023	SV Babelsberg	29	(7)
2023–2024	Energie Cottbus	10	(0)
2024–	Greifswalder FC	37	(6)
- * Club domestic league appearances and goals as of 22 June 2026

Rudolf Dovny Ndualu (born 22 July 1999) is a German professional footballer who plays as a midfielder for Greifswalder FC.

== Career ==
He moved to MSV Duisburg in the summer of 2021. He made his professional debut in the 3. Liga on 8 August 2021, in the home match against TSV Havelse. in August 2022, after his contract was voided, he moved to SV Babelsberg.

== Career statistics ==
As of 29 August 2021

Club	Season	Division	League		Cup		Continental		Total	
Club	Season	Division	Apps	Goals	Apps	Goals	Apps	Goals	Apps	Goals
Tennis Borussia Berlin	2016–17	NOFV-Oberliga	5	1	—		—		5	1
Viktoria Berlin	2018–19	Regionalliga Nordost	9	1	—		—		9	1
Viktoria Berlin	2019–20	Regionalliga Nordost	11	1	1	0	—		12	1
Viktoria Berlin	Total		20	2	1	0	—		21	2
Tennis Borussia Berlin	2020–21	Regionalliga Nordost	10	4	—		—		10	4
MSV Duisburg	2021–22	3. Liga	3	0	—		—		3	0
MSV Duisburg	2022–23	3. Liga	0	0	—		—		0	0
MSV Duisburg	Total		3	0	0	0	—		3	0
Career total			38	7	1	0	—		39	7

== See Also ==
- Football in Germany
