= Niklas Jeck =

German footballer

Personal information
- Date of birth: 18 September 2001 (age 25)
- Height: 1.94 m (6 ft 4 in)
- Position: Centre-back

Team information
- Current team: SpVgg Bayreuth
- Number: 22

Youth career
- 2008–2019: Erzgebirge Aue

Senior career*
Years	Team	Apps	(Gls)
2019–2023	Erzgebirge Aue	1	(0)
2019–2020	→ VfB Auerbach (loan)	14	(0)
2021–2022	→ Union Titus Pétange (loan)	25	(1)
2023	Wormatia Worms	14	(1)
2023–2025	FV Illertissen	54	(3)
2026	ZFC Meuselwitz	11	(0)
2026–	SpVgg Bayreuth	7	(1)
- * Club domestic league appearances and goals as of 27 September 2026

Niklas Jeck (born 18 September 2001) is a German professional footballer who plays as a centre-back for SpVgg Bayreuth.

== Career ==
A native of Stollberg, Jeck joined Erzgebirge Aue's academy in 2008 and graduated through their academy whilst attending Sportgymnasium Chemnitz. He joined VfB Auerbach on a season-long loan on 30 August 2019. He made 14 appearances in the Regionalliga Nordost across the 2019–20 season. He made his 2. Bundesliga debut for Erzgebirge Aue as an 88th-minute substitute in an 8–3 home defeat to SC Paderborn on 9 May 2021.

Jeck moved to Union Titus Pétange on loan for the 2021–22 season.

On 18 January 2023, Jeck signed with Wormatia Worms.

He transferred to FV Illertissen in summer 2023, but left the club in summer 2025 at the end of his contract.

He signed for ZFC Meuselwitz in February 2026.

== Career statistics ==
As of match played 9 May 2021

Appearances and goals by club, season and competition
Club	Season	League			DFB-Pokal		Other		Total	
Club	Season	Division	Apps	Goals	Apps	Goals	Apps	Goals	Apps	Goals
Erzgebirge Aue	2019–20	2. Bundesliga	0	0	0	0	0	0	0	0
Erzgebirge Aue	2020–21	2. Bundesliga	1	0	0	0	0	0	1	0
Erzgebirge Aue	Total		1	0	0	0	0	0	1	0
VfB Auerbach (loan)	2019–20	Regionalliga Nordost	14	0	—		0	0	14	0
Career total			15	0	0	0	0	0	15	0
