= Marius Grösch =

German footballer

Personal information
- Date of birth: 7 March 1994 (age 32)
- Place of birth: Fulda, Germany
- Height: 1.88 m (6 ft 2 in)
- Position: Defender

Team information
- Current team: SG Barockstadt
- Number: 15

Youth career
- FCB Eichenzell
- TSV Künzell
- TSV Lehnerz
- –2009: SG Viktoria Bronnzell
- 2009–2013: Carl Zeiss Jena

Senior career*
Years	Team	Apps	(Gls)
2012–2015	Carl Zeiss Jena	64	(3)
2014–2015	Carl Zeiss Jena II	3	(0)
2015–2017	1. FC Kaiserslautern II	47	(1)
2017–2021	Carl Zeiss Jena	94	(3)
2021–	SG Barockstadt	117	(12)
- * Club domestic league appearances and goals as of 26 June 2026

Marius Grösch (born 7 March 1994) is a German footballer who plays as a defender for SG Barockstadt.
