= Ernst-Abbe-Sportfeld =

Sports facility in Jena, Germany

Ernst Abbe Sportfeld
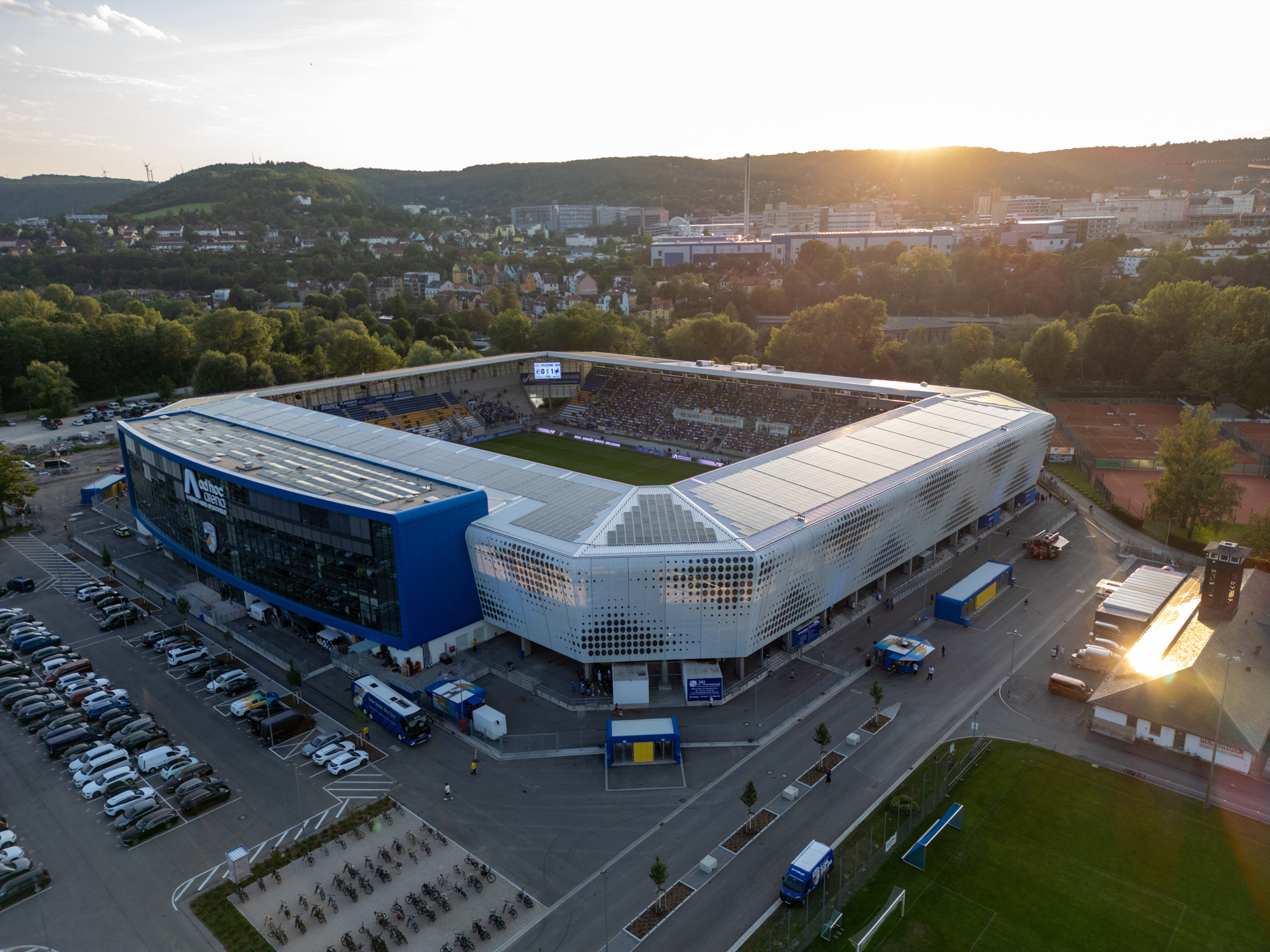
- Interactive map of Ernst Abbe Sportfeld
- Location: Jena, Thuringia
- Coordinates: 50°54′58″N 11°34′59″E
- Capacity: 15,000
- Surface: Natural grass
- Field size: 105m × 68m (field only)

Construction
- Groundbreaking: 1922
- Opened: 24 August 1924
- Expanded: 1974 Floodlights (renovated in 1995); 1978 Scoreboard (replaced in 2006); 1997 New grandstand 2007 Turf-heating system 2007 Video monitoring system 2007 Field enlargement

Tenant
- FC Carl Zeiss Jena

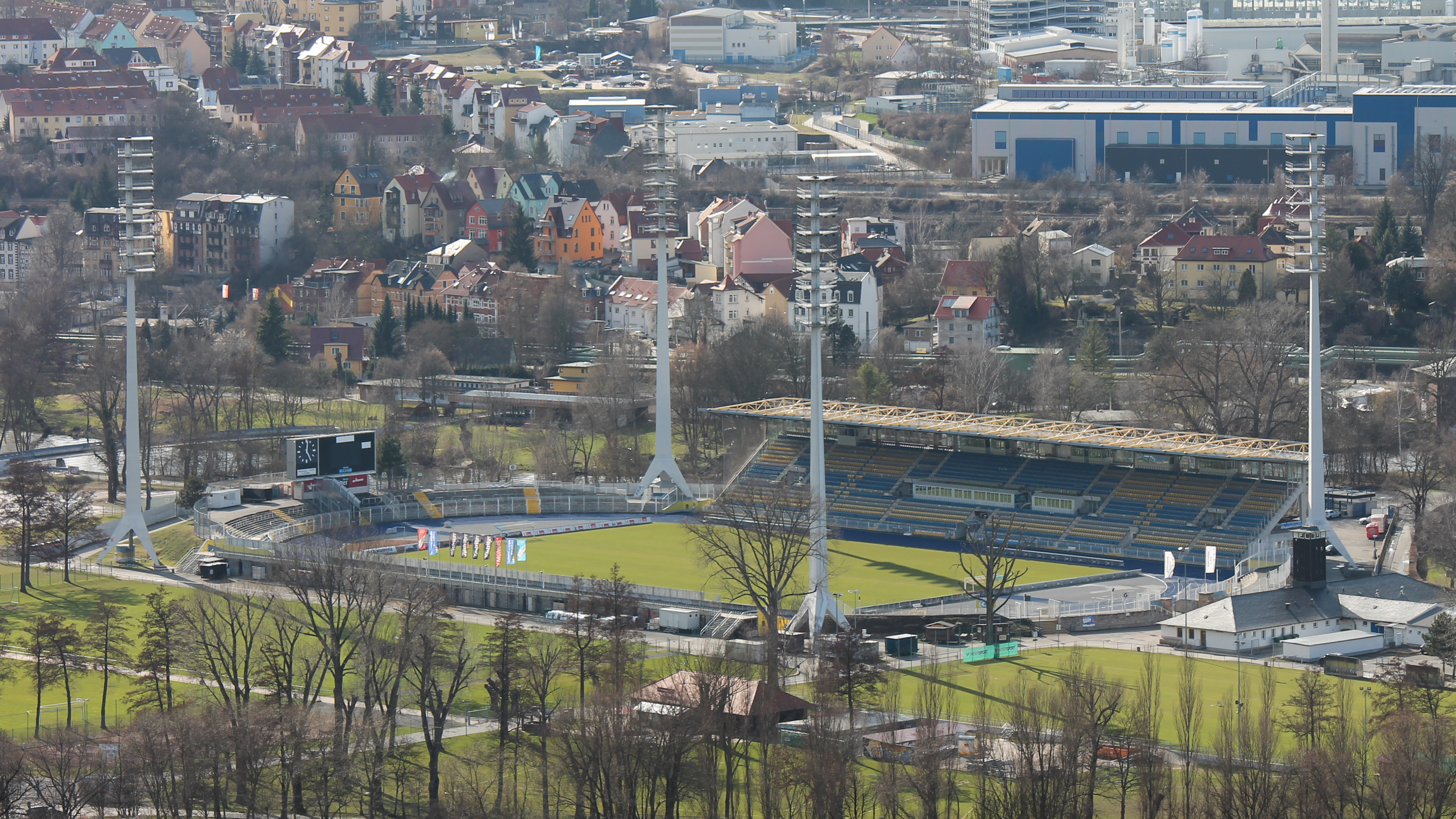
The stadium before the renovation

The Ernst Abbe Sportfeld is a sports facility in Jena, Germany. The main stadium at the sports facility is the ad hoc arena. It was dedicated on 24 August 1924 and was named after entrepreneur Ernst Abbe 15 years later. The facility is in southern Jena, directly on the Saale River. The City of Jena purchased the stadium from the Ernst-Abbe-Stiftung (The Ernst Abbe Foundation) in 1991.

The soccer and track stadium in the Ernst-Abbe-Sportfeld is the home field of FC Carl Zeiss Jena. It was homestead for famous sprints, javelin throw and long jump athletes like Petra Felke and Heike Drechsler, when Sport-Club Motor Jena still existed, and it has a capacity of over 12,990. There are 6,540 seats with 4,010 covered seats in the main stands. The spectator capacity will be increased to 14,000. 1997 saw the replacement of the original wooden bleachers from 1924 (which could seat only 420 people) with the new, modern stands to accommodate more spectators. The stadium's lights were mounted on four massive, hollow steel towers and were the result of the 1974 and 1994 renovations of the facility. The steel towers were taken down in 2013. The electronic scoreboard was installed in 1978 and was the first of its kind in East Germany.

The attendance record was set in 1962. Despite the then official capacity of 16,000 spectators, approximately 27,500 visitors found the way into the stadium for the UEFA Cup Winners' Cup semi-final versus Atlético Madrid.

Next to the stadium are additional facilities for soccer, track, and various other sports.

== Miscellanea ==
- The world record for the javelin throw was set at the Ernst-Abbe-Sportfeld on May 25, 1996, by Jan Železný.
- The Ernst-Abbe-Sportfeld won the award of world stadium of the year in 2024, beating the likes of the newly renovated stadiums of the Santiago Bernabéu, Madrid, Spain in close second, and Mas Monumental in Buenos Aires, Argentina making fifth place.
