= Jahnstadion, Rheda-Wiedenbrück =

Football stadium in Rheda-Wiedenbrück, Germany

Coordinates: 51°50′01″N 8°19′19″E

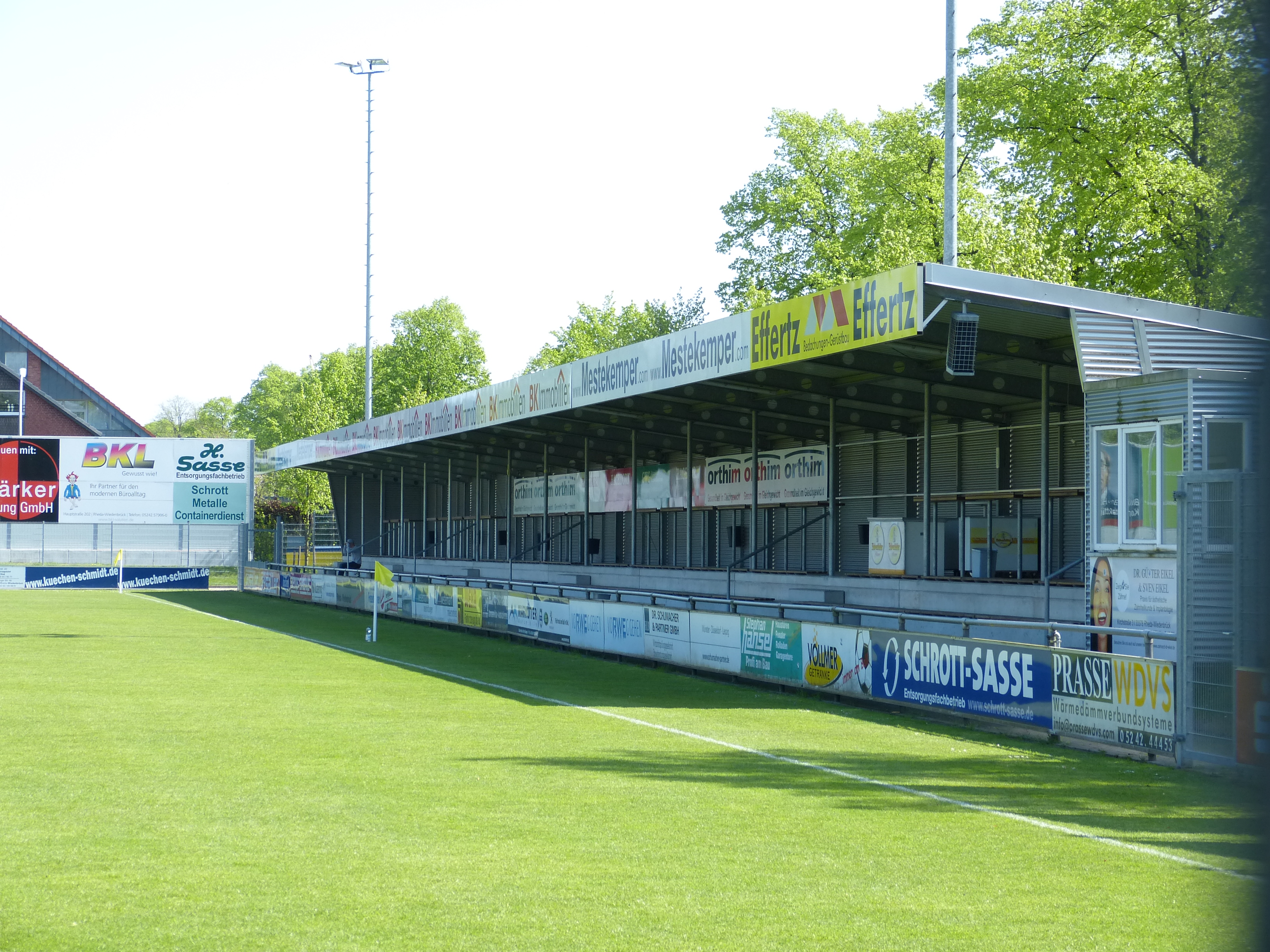

Jahnstadion is a multi-use stadium in Rheda-Wiedenbrück, Germany. It is currently used mostly for football matches and is the home stadium of SC Wiedenbrück 2000. The stadium currently has a capacity of 3,500 spectators and opened in 2000.
