= Guillaume Cros =

French footballer (born 1995)

Personal information
- Date of birth: 19 April 1995 (age 31)
- Place of birth: Béziers, France
- Height: 1.71 m (5 ft 7 in)
- Position: Left-back

Team information
- Current team: RCO Agde

Youth career
- 2002–2006: Cheminot Béziers
- 2006–2009: Béziers
- 2009–2012: Sochaux

Senior career*
Years	Team	Apps	(Gls)
2012–2015	Sochaux II	51	(0)
2014	→ Sochaux	2	(0)
2015–2016	RCO Agde	21	(2)
2016–2019	Carl Zeiss Jena	69	(0)
2019	Hansa Rostock	3	(0)
2020–	RCO Agde	48	(2)

International career
2012–2013	France U18	3	(0)
2014	France U20	1	(0)
- * Club domestic league appearances and goals as of 1 July 2023

Guillaume Cros (born 19 April 1995) is a French professional footballer who plays as a left-back for RCO Agde.

== Club career ==
Cros is a youth exponent from Sochaux. He made his Ligue 2 debut at the opening day of the 2014–15 season against US Orléans.

In the 2015–16 season he played for fifth-tier club RCO Agde, near his hometown Béziers.

On 22 July 2016, he moved to Germany signing for Regionalliga Nordost side Carl Zeiss Jena having previously trialled with the club. On 30 January 2019, he agreed the termination of his contract with the club after he had previously stated he would not renew his contract.

A day later, on the last day of 2018–19 winter transfer window, Cros joined Hansa Rostock, league rivals of Jena in the 3. Liga. He agreed a half-year contract with the option of a further season.
