= René Eckardt =

German footballer (born 1990)

Personal information
- Date of birth: 22 February 1990 (age 36)
- Place of birth: Jena, East Germany
- Height: 1.79 m (5 ft 10 in)
- Position: Midfielder

Team information
- Current team: ZFC Meuselwitz
- Number: 30

Youth career
- 1995–1998: SV Lobeda 77
- 1998–2008: Carl Zeiss Jena

Senior career*
Years	Team	Apps	(Gls)
2008–2013	Carl Zeiss Jena II	28	(3)
2008–2013	Carl Zeiss Jena	94	(6)
2014–2021	Carl Zeiss Jena	164	(18)
2021–	ZFC Meuselwitz	137	(13)

International career
2009	Germany U-20		
- * Club domestic league appearances and goals as of 22 June 2026

René Eckardt (born 22 February 1990) is a professional German football midfielder who plays for ZFC Meuselwitz.

== Career ==
Born in Jena, Thuringia, Eckardt began his career SV Lobeda 77 before 1998 moving to the youth from FC Carl Zeiss Jena in October 2008 was promoted to the first team. He played 7 games before he scored his first goal on 22 November 2008 against Stuttgarter Kickers.

== International career ==
On 27 August 2009, Eckardt earned his first call up for Germany U-20 national team for a friendly game against Austria U-20.
