= Justin Schau =

German footballer

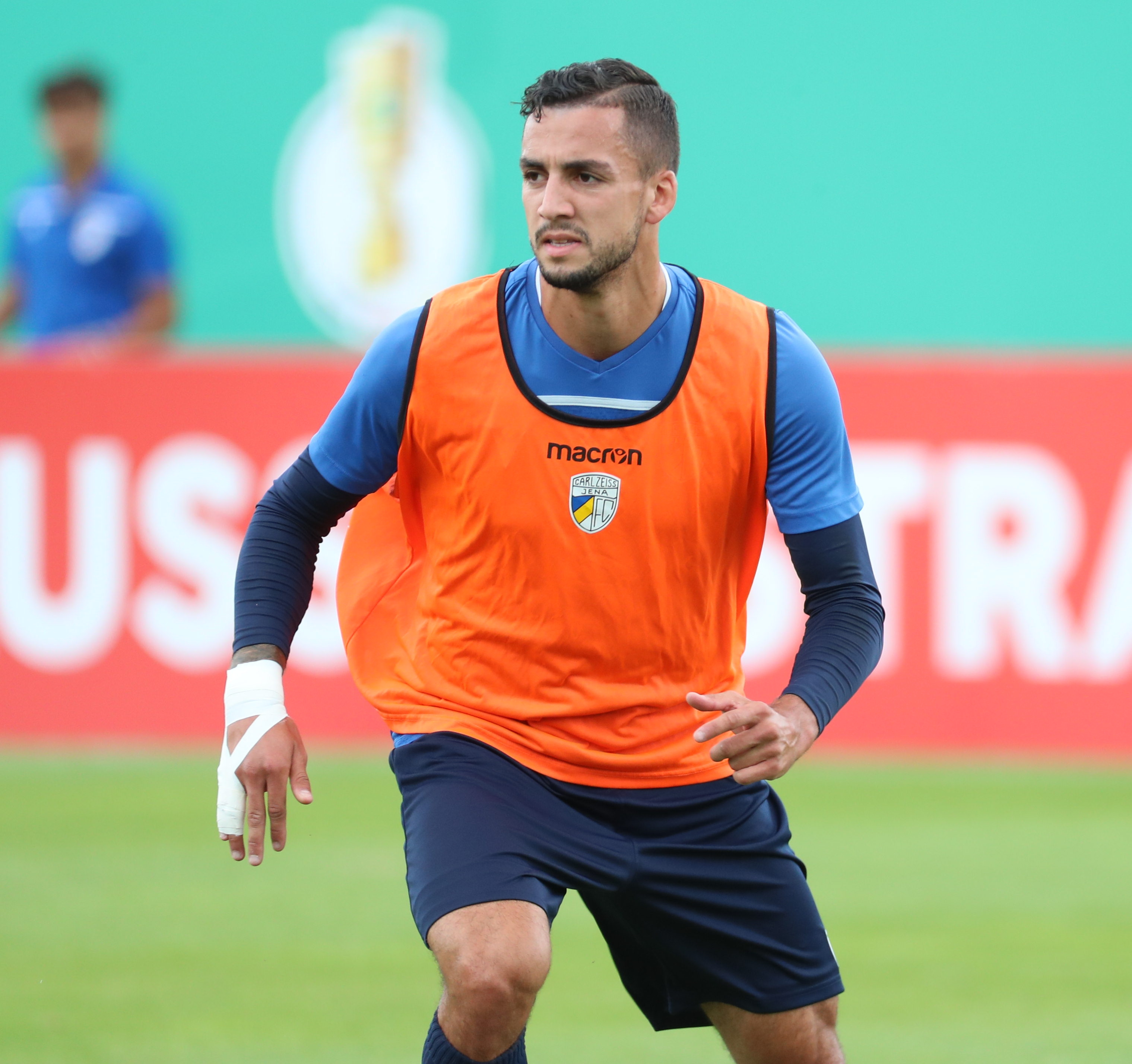
- Justin Schau (2021)

Personal information
- Full name: Justin Schau
- Date of birth: 21 September 1998 (age 28)
- Place of birth: Jena, Germany
- Height: 1.77 m (5 ft 10 in)
- Position: Midfielder

Team information
- Current team: Carl Zeiss Jena
- Number: 25

Youth career
- –2012: Carl Zeiss Jena
- 2012–2015: RB Leipzig
- 2015–2017: Dynamo Dresden

Senior career*
Years	Team	Apps	(Gls)
2017–	Carl Zeiss Jena	186	(3)
2017–2018	Carl Zeiss Jena II	17	(3)
- * Club domestic league appearances and goals as of 22 June 2026

Justin Schau (born 21 September 1998) is a German footballer who plays as a midfielder for Carl Zeiss Jena.
