= Davud Tuma =

German footballer

Personal information
- Date of birth: 16 May 1996 (age 30)
- Place of birth: Gütersloh, Germany
- Height: 1.79 m (5 ft 10 in)
- Position: Forward

Team information
- Current team: SC Wiedenbrück
- Number: 27

Youth career
- FC Gütersloh 2000
- –2015: Arminia Bielefeld

Senior career*
Years	Team	Apps	(Gls)
2015	Arminia Bielefeld II	7	(1)
2015–2017	Rot-Weiß Oberhausen	22	(0)
2015–2016	Rot-Weiß Oberhausen II	6	(2)
2017–2018	Carl Zeiss Jena	27	(2)
2017	Carl Zeiss Jena II	3	(1)
2018–2019	Hallescher FC	15	(0)
2019–2020	Chemnitzer FC	23	(1)
2020–2022	Kickers Offenbach	59	(6)
2022–2023	Rot Weiss Ahlen	24	(0)
2023–	SC Wiedenbrück	84	(14)
- * Club domestic league appearances and goals as of 23 September 2026

Davud Tuma (born Davud Gügör; 16 May 1996) is a German professional footballer who plays as a forward for SC Wiedenbrück.

== Personal life ==
Born in Germany to parents of Armenian descent, David changed his last name from the Turkish given "Gügör" to his families original last name "Tuma".
