= Niclas Erlbeck =

German footballer

Personal information
- Full name: Niclas Erlbeck
- Date of birth: 10 January 1993 (age 33)
- Place of birth: Kassel, Germany
- Height: 1.84 m (6 ft 0 in)
- Position: Midfielder

Team information
- Current team: Chemnitzer FC
- Number: 6

Youth career
- 1997–2006: SV Kaufungen 07
- 2006–2008: Hessen Kassel
- 2008–2011: SC Paderborn

Senior career*
Years	Team	Apps	(Gls)
2011–2013	SC Paderborn	0	(0)
2013–2015	Eintracht Braunschweig II	43	(6)
2015–2019	Carl Zeiss Jena	77	(3)
2019	Chemnitzer FC	0	(0)
2019–2023	Energie Cottbus	56	(1)
2023–	Chemnitzer FC	43	(2)
- * Club domestic league appearances and goals as of 6 March 2026

Niclas Erlbeck (born 10 January 1993) is a German footballer who plays as a midfielder for Chemnitzer FC.

== Career ==
On 16 January 2019, Erlbeck joined fourth-tier club Chemnitzer FC from 3. Liga side Carl Zeiss Jena. Six days later, he wanted to leave the club for personal reasons, and the contract was terminated by mutual consent. Erlbeck was without club until 30 August 2019, where he signed a season-long deal with FC Energie Cottbus.
