= Valentin Reitstetter =

German footballer

Personal information
- Full name: Valentin Reitstetter
- Date of birth: 18 January 1998 (age 28)
- Place of birth: Schweinfurt, Germany
- Height: 1.87 m (6 ft 2 in)
- Position: Centre back

Team information
- Current team: TSV Großbardorf
- Number: 22

Youth career
- –2014: 1. FC Schweinfurt
- 2014–2017: Carl Zeiss Jena

Senior career*
Years	Team	Apps	(Gls)
2017–2019	Carl Zeiss Jena II	42	(2)
2018–2019	Carl Zeiss Jena	1	(0)
2019–	TSV Großbardorf	3	(0)
- * Club domestic league appearances and goals as of 19:44, 22 July 2019 (UTC)

Valentin Reitstetter (born 18 January 1998) is a German footballer who plays as a defender for TSV Großbardorf.
