= Jerome Assauer =

German footballer

Personal information
- Full name: Jerome Assauer
- Date of birth: 6 June 1988 (age 38)
- Place of birth: Cologne, West Germany
- Height: 1.86 m (6 ft 1 in)
- Position: Striker

Youth career
- 1996–2001: BC Efferen
- 2001–2005: Borussia Mönchengladbach
- 2005–2006: 1. FC Köln

Senior career*
Years	Team	Apps	(Gls)
2006–2007	1. FC Köln II	3	(0)
2007–2008	SC Paderborn	6	(0)
2009–2010	Preußen Münster	37	(6)
2010–2012	Wuppertaler SV Borussia	46	(14)
2012	Sportfreunde Lotte	7	(0)
2012–2014	TuS Koblenz	49	(25)
2014–2015	Viktoria Köln	13	(5)
Total		161	(50)

Managerial career
- 2018: Germania Erftstadt-Lechenich (assistant)
- * Club domestic league appearances and goals

Jerome Assauer (born 6 June 1988) is a retired German footballer who played as a striker.

== Career ==
On June 4, 2010, Wuppertaler SV Borussia announced on their club website the signing of Assauer for the 2010/11 season, where the striker received a contract until 2012. During the 2011/12 winter break, Assauer transferred within the league from WSV to Sportfreunde Lotte. There, he was supposed to help lead the club to the 3. Liga, a goal that ultimately failed, with them finishing as runners-up behind promoted Borussia Dortmund II.

After half a year in Lotte, Assauer left the club and moved within the league to TuS Koblenz. There he met his former coach Michael Dämgen, who had previously coached him in Wuppertal. Assauer had his best season to date with TuS, scoring 20 goals in 35 games and becoming the top scorer in the Regionalliga Südwest in 2012/13.

In late July 2014, Viktoria Köln announced the signing of Assauer on a one-year deal.
