= SC Wiedenbrück =

Association football club in Germany

- Full name: SC Wiedenbrück
- Founded: 2000; 26 years ago
- Ground: Jahnstadion
- Capacity: 2,550
- Chairman: Dr. Michael Reinker
- Manager: Dominik Sammer
- League: Regionalliga West (IV)
- 2025–26: Regionalliga West, 15th of 18
- Website: http://www.scwiedenbrueck.de
Home colours	Away colours

SC Wiedenbrück is a German association football club from the city of Rheda-Wiedenbrück, North Rhine-Westphalia. The footballers are part of a sports club of some 1,150 members that also includes departments for dance, gymnastics, and table tennis.

== History ==
Sportclub Wiedenbrück was created through the merger of DJK Wiedenbrück and Westfalia Wiedenbrück in 2000. Following the union the football side took up DJK's place in the sixth tier Bezirksliga, and quickly moved up to the Verbandsliga Westfalen (V). The club slipped to play in the Landesliga in 2005, but recovered the next season, returning to the Verbandsliga where they finished as runners-up in 2007. That finish earned SC promotion to the fourth division Oberliga Westfalen alongside champions SV Schermbeck. Wiedenbrück suffered through a poor season in 2007–08 and were relegated after a 17th-place result. After one season in the Verbandsliga, SC Wiedenbrück were runners-up in the NRW-Liga. In the NRW-Liga the team won the championship and earned promotion to the tier four Regionalliga West, where they played for nine seasons before being relegated in 2019.

== Stadium ==
The SC Wiedenbrück plays its home fixtures in the Jahnstadion, which was improved between 2003 and 2006 to include a seating area and enlarged general admission grandstand. In 2022 they added a roof to the standing section.

== Current squad ==
As of 8 September 2026

Note: Flags indicate national team as defined under FIFA eligibility rules; some limited exceptions apply. Players may hold more than one non-FIFA nationality.

No.	Pos.	Nation	Player
1	GK	GER	Marcel Hölscher (Captain)
3	DF	BUL	Simeon Tsanev
4	MF	GER	Julius Bochmann (on loan from Chemnitzer FC)
5	DF	GER	Tim Geller
6	MF	GER	Marius Zentler
7	FW	GER	Niklas Szeleschus
8	MF	GER	Tom Krüger
9	FW	GER	Sebastian Mai
10	MF	GER	Saban Kaptan
11	DF	GRE	Maik Amedick
14	DF	GER	Alessandro Toia
15	MF	GER	Enes Saygili
16	MF	GER	Samuele Carella (on loan from Viktoria Köln)
17	FW	GER	Marlon Lakämper

No.	Pos.	Nation	Player
18	MF	GER	Timo Kondziella
19	FW	GER	Leon Kayser
20	MF	GER	Janis Seiler (on loan from Verl II)
21	DF	GRE	Charalampos Chantzopoulos
22	MF	GER	Furkan Yilmaz
23	MF	GER	Max Ritter
24	FW	GER	Elia Schütte
25	DF	GER	Iskender Aslan
27	FW	GER	Davud Tuma
29	FW	GER	Niklas Tuppeck
30	DF	GER	Joschka Kroll (on loan from VfL Osnabrück)
32	GK	GER	Adel Sino
38	GK	GER	Lukas Kasparek

=== Out on loan ===
Note: Flags indicate national team as defined under FIFA eligibility rules; some limited exceptions apply. Players may hold more than one non-FIFA nationality.

No.	Pos.	Nation	Player

== Honours ==
The club's honours:

- NRW-Liga (V)
  - Champions: 2010
- Oberliga Westfalen (V)
  - Champions: 2020
- Verbandsliga Westfalen Group 1 (VI)
  - Champions: 2009
  - Runners-up: 2007
- Westphalia Cup
  - Winners: 2011
