= Julian Günther-Schmidt =

German footballer (born 1994)

Personal information
- Date of birth: 13 September 1994 (age 32)
- Place of birth: Pforzheim, Germany
- Height: 1.83 m (6 ft 0 in)
- Position: Forward

Team information
- Current team: FC 08 Homburg
- Number: 20

Youth career
- SV Büchenbronn
- Germania Brötzingen
- FC Nöttingen
- –2012: Waldhof Mannheim
- 2012–2013: Karlsruher SC

Senior career*
Years	Team	Apps	(Gls)
2013–2015	FC Ingolstadt II	41	(4)
2014–2015	FC Ingolstadt	1	(0)
2015–2019	FC Augsburg II	50	(19)
2016–2019	FC Augsburg	4	(0)
2017–2019	→ Carl Zeiss Jena (loan)	41	(12)
2019–2020	Carl Zeiss Jena	24	(3)
2020–2021	Fortuna Köln	20	(6)
2021–2025	1. FC Saarbrücken	140	(22)
2025–2026	Erzgebirge Aue	31	(2)
2026–	FC 08 Homburg	7	(2)
- * Club domestic league appearances and goals as of 24 September 2026

Julian Günther-Schmidt (born 13 September 1994) is a German professional footballer who plays as a forward for FC 08 Homburg.

== Career ==
Born in Pforzheim, Germany, Günther-Schmidt played for youth teams of Waldhof Mannheim and Karlsruher SC. Having completed his Abitur, he moved to the youth academy of FC Ingolstadt. At Ingolstadt, he mostly featured in matches of the club's reserves and made one substitute appearance in the 2. Bundesliga against VfL Bochum in November 2014.

In September 2015, Günther-Schmidt signed with FC Augsburg. Having scored 8 goals in 12 matches for the reserves in the Regionalliga he made his Bundesliga debut on 23 October 2016 against SC Freiburg.

On 15 April 2025, Günther-Schmidt agreed to move to Erzgebirge Aue for the 2025–26 season.

== Career statistics ==
As of match played 15 October 2022

Appearances and goals by club, season and competition
Club	Season	League			National Cup		Other		Total	
Club	Season	Division	Apps	Goals	Apps	Goals	Apps	Goals	Apps	Goals
FC Ingolstadt II	2013–14	Regionalliga Bayern	20	0	–		–		20	0
FC Ingolstadt II	2014–15	Regionalliga Bayern	21	4	–		–		21	4
FC Ingolstadt II	Total		41	4	–		0	0	41	4
FC Ingolstadt	2014–15	2. Bundesliga	1	0	0	0	–		1	0
FC Augsburg II	2015–16	Regionalliga Bayern	24	6	–		2 (Note: Appearances in the Regionalliga Bayern relegation play-offs)	0	26	6
FC Augsburg II	2016–17	Regionalliga Bayern	19	11	–		–		19	11
FC Augsburg II	2017–18	Regionalliga Bayern	7	2	–		–		7	2
FC Augsburg II	Total		50	19	–		2	0	52	19
FC Augsburg	2016–17	Bundesliga	4	0	1	0	–		5	0
Carl Zeiss Jena (loan)	2017–18	3. Liga	32	8	0	0	–		32	8
Carl Zeiss Jena (loan)	2018–19	3. Liga	9	5	0	0	–		9	5
Carl Zeiss Jena	2019–20	3. Liga	24	3	0	0	–		24	3
Carl Zeiss Jena	Total		65	16	0	0	–		65	16
Fortuna Köln	2020–21	Regionalliga West	20	7	–		–		20	7
1. FC Saarbrücken	2020–21	3. Liga	17	6	0	0	–		17	6
1. FC Saarbrücken	2021–22	3. Liga	35	10	0	0	–		35	10
1. FC Saarbrücken	2022–23	3. Liga	12	1	0	0	–		12	1
1. FC Saarbrücken	Total		64	17	0	0	–		64	17
Career total			245	63	1	0	2	0	248	63
