= ZFC Meuselwitz =

German association football club from Meuselwitz, Thuringia

- Full name: Zipsendorfer Fußballclub Meuselwitz e.V.
- Founded: 1948
- Ground: bluechip-Arena
- Capacity: 5,260
- Chairman: Hubert Wolf
- Manager: Heiko Weber
- League: NOFV-Oberliga Süd (V)
- 2025–26: Regionalliga Nordost, 16th of 18
Home colours	Away colours

Zipsendorfer Fußballclub Meuselwitz is a German association football club from Meuselwitz, Thuringia.

== History ==
The origins of the club go back to the establishment of Aktivist Zipsendorf in 1919. After World War II the club played as BSG Aktivist Zipsendorf and enjoyed some early minor success with three consecutive titles (1954–56) in the Kreisliga Altenburg and a 1962 win in local cup play. However, the club remained mired in the lower echelons of East German competition. When the community of Zipsendorf was merged into nearby Meuselwitz in 1976 the team was re-christened BSG Aktivist Meuselwitz. In 1991, after German re-unification the year before, the club briefly joined SV Bergbau as that association's football department before going their own way, first as FV Zipsendorf and then, in 1994, as Zipsendorfer Fußballclub Meuselwitz.

Mid-way through the decade the club began an ascent out of the lower divisions of German football. Between 1993 and 1997 they worked their way up through four different divisions on the strength of four consecutive titles before settling into the Landesliga Thuringia (V) for seven seasons.

Under coach Damian Halata the club reached the semi-finals of the 2003 Thüringerpokal (Thuringia Cup) and the following season captured the Landesliga title to advance to the NOFV-Oberliga Süd (IV) where they played for five seasons until winning promotion to the Regionalliga Nord in 2009. After three seasons at this level the club moved to the Regionalliga Nordost in 2012 when this league was reformed. It has been playing as a mid-table side in this league since.

The association has grown to include departments for bowling and cheerleading.

== Stadium ==
The club plays its home matches in the bluechip-Arena (capacity 5,000) named under a sponsorship agreement with a local computer firm. The facility was constructed as the Stadion Glaserkuppe in 1953 and refurbished over a two-year period ending in 2004.

== Current squad ==
As of 6 February 2026

Note: Flags indicate national team as defined under FIFA eligibility rules; some limited exceptions apply. Players may hold more than one non-FIFA nationality.

No.	Pos.	Nation	Player
1	GK	GER	Justin Fietz
3	DF	GER	Felix Rehder
5	MF	GER	Eric Stiller
6	MF	GER	Luca Bürger
9	FW	GER	Andy Trübenbach
10	MF	GER	Cemal Kaymaz
11	FW	GER	Elias Ndukwe Oke
13	DF	GER	David Pfeil
14	MF	GER	Nick Seidemann
16	DF	GER	Ben Keßler
17	DF	GER	Hendrik Wurr
18	MF	GER	Theo Teßmer

No.	Pos.	Nation	Player
19	FW	GER	Christoph Pauling
20	DF	GER	Fabian Raithel
21	FW	GNB	Califo Baldé
22	FW	GER	Florian Hansch
23	FW	GER	Luis Fischer
27	MF	GER	Bastian Burghold
30	MF	GER	René Eckardt
32	GK	GER	Chris Kroner
33	DF	GER	Leon Schmökel
36	GK	GER	Lukas Sedlak
38	DF	GER	Niklas Jeck
-	FW	GER	Felix Pilger

== Honours ==
The club's honours:

- NOFV-Oberliga Süd (V)
  - Champions: 2009
- Landesliga Thüringen (V)
  - Champions: 2004
- Landesklasse Ost (V)
  - Champions: 1997
- Kreisliga Altenburg (VI)
  - Champions: 1994
- Bezirksliga Gera (VI)
  - Champions: 1996
- Bezirksklasse Gera (VII)
  - Champions: 1995
- Thuringian Cup
  - Champions: 2010, 2011, 2025

== Recent seasons ==
The recent season-by-season performance of the club:

Year	Division	Tier	Position
1999–2000	Thüringenliga	V	6th
2000–01	Thüringenliga	V	7th
2001–02	Thüringenliga	V	8th
2002–03	Thüringenliga	V	2nd
2003–04	Thüringenliga	V	1st ↑
2004–05	NOFV-Oberliga Süd	IV	6th
2005–06	NOFV-Oberliga Süd	IV	5th
2006–07	NOFV-Oberliga Süd	IV	5th
2007–08	NOFV-Oberliga Süd	IV	8th
2008–09	NOFV-Oberliga Süd	V	1st ↑
2009–10	Regionalliga Nord	IV	10th
2010–11	Regionalliga Nord	IV	11th
2011–12	Regionalliga Nord	IV	9th
2012–13	Regionalliga Nordost	IV	7th
2013–14	Regionalliga Nordost	IV	10th
2014–15	Regionalliga Nordost	IV	14th
2015–16	Regionalliga Nordost	IV	14th
2016–17	Regionalliga Nordost	IV	14th
2017–18	Regionalliga Nordost	IV	10th
2018–19	Regionalliga Nordost	IV	10th
2019–20	Regionalliga Nordost	IV	10th
2020–21	Regionalliga Nordost	IV	18th
2021–22	Regionalliga Nordost	IV	14th

- With the introduction of the Regionalligas in 1994 and the 3. Liga in 2008 as the new third tier, below the 2. Bundesliga, all leagues below dropped one tier.

↑ Promoted	↓ Relegated
