= Seigel Rodney =

Montserratian footballer

Personal information
- Full name: Seigel Tauwaun Ajae Rodney
- Date of birth: 2 October 2003 (age 23)
- Place of birth: Montserrat
- Position: Forward

Team information
- Current team: TuS Esens

Youth career
- 2020–2022: Hartpury College
- 2021–2022: Gloucester City

Senior career*
Years	Team	Apps	(Gls)
2023–2024	Pigotts Bullets	18	(5)
2024–2025	Erfurt-Nord	10	(9)
2025–2026	SpVgg Geratal	26	(9)
2026–	TuS Esens	0	(0)

International career^{‡}
2023–	Montserrat	9	(0)
- * Club domestic league appearances and goals as of 14:20, 3 August 2026 (UTC) ‡ National team caps and goals as of 15:56, 13 November 2026 (UTC)

Seigel Rodney (born 2 October 2003) is a Montserratian footballer who plays for German club TuS Esens and the Montserrat national team.

== Club career ==
As a youth, Rodney was part of the Montserrat Football Association Youth Development Programme. In November 2019, he was one of six players from Montserrat to attend a combine in Antigua and Barbuda to be observed by scouts from Kettering Town, Generation Next FC, and the Hartpury College academy, all from England. Seigel was one of two youths from Montserrat selected to attend Hartpury College on a two-year scholarship following the combine. In September 2020, he left for England to play football and study for a BTEC Extended Diploma in Sport following his graduation from Montserrat Secondary School.

While at Hartpury, Rodney also trained with Generation Next FC of the Cheltenham Association Football League and Gloucester City in the Midland Football League. In May 2022, he scored two goals in a 2–1 finals victory over Rockleaze Rangers U18 to win the Gloucestershire Football Association Youth Shield.

At the conclusion of his scholarship, Rodney returned to the Caribbean and joined Pigotts Bullets of the Antigua and Barbuda Premier Division. Despite the team winning only three out of its first eleven matches, Rodney became a consistent scorer, including goals against former champions SAP. Other standout performances included goals against John Hughes and Parham. In total, he scored five goals in eighteen league matches for the Bullets during the 2023–24 season.

Rodney returned to Europe by joining the Soccer Academy Arnstadt in Arnstadt, Germany in 2024. Shortly thereafter, he joined local club FC Erfurt-Nord of the Landesklasse Thüringen-Nord prior to the start of the second half of the season. By May 2025, the club sat at the top of the league table with Rodney and his strike partner Niklas Kliem considered one of the best attacking duos in the league. Rodney's performances included seven goals in the five previous matches at that point.

Prior to the 2025–26 Thüringenliga season, Rodney signed with SpVgg Geratal. He came on as a second-half substitute on the first matchday of the season, going on to score and secure a point in the 1–1 draw with FSV Wacker 90 Nordhausen. He scored again in the club's second match, a 1–2 defeat to Blau-Weiß Bad Frankenhausen.

In summer 2026, Rodney moved to TuS Esens of the Bezirksliga Weser-Ems, the seventh tier of football in Lower Saxony. He debuted for the club in the first round of the Bezirkspokal. He entered as a substitute and scored in the eventual 7–1 victory over Heidmühler FC.

== International career ==
As a youth, Rodney represented Montserrat at the under-14, under-15, and under-17 levels. In February 2020, the player was included in Montserrat's national under-20 team for 2020 CONCACAF U-20 Championship qualifying in Honduras at age 16. He made his senior debut on 11 September 2023 in a 2023–24 CONCACAF Nations League B match against the Dominican Republic. With the debut, Rodney became only the second-ever player born and raised entirely in Montserrat to earn a cap with the senior national team.

In June 2025, Rodney was called up to the senior squad again for 2026 FIFA World Cup qualification matches against Belize and Guyana. During a training camp in Trinidad and Tobago prior to the matches, he scored in a practice match against local club Pro Series FC.

== Cricket ==
As a youth, Rodney also played cricket and was included in the Leeward Islands Under-15 squad for the 2018 West Indies Under 15 Championship in Jamaica.

== Football career statistics ==
As of match played 10 June 2025.

Montserrat
Year	Apps	Goals
2023	4	0
2024	1	0
2025	2	0
Total	7	0
