= Baysdale =

Valley in North Yorkshire, England

- Basedale
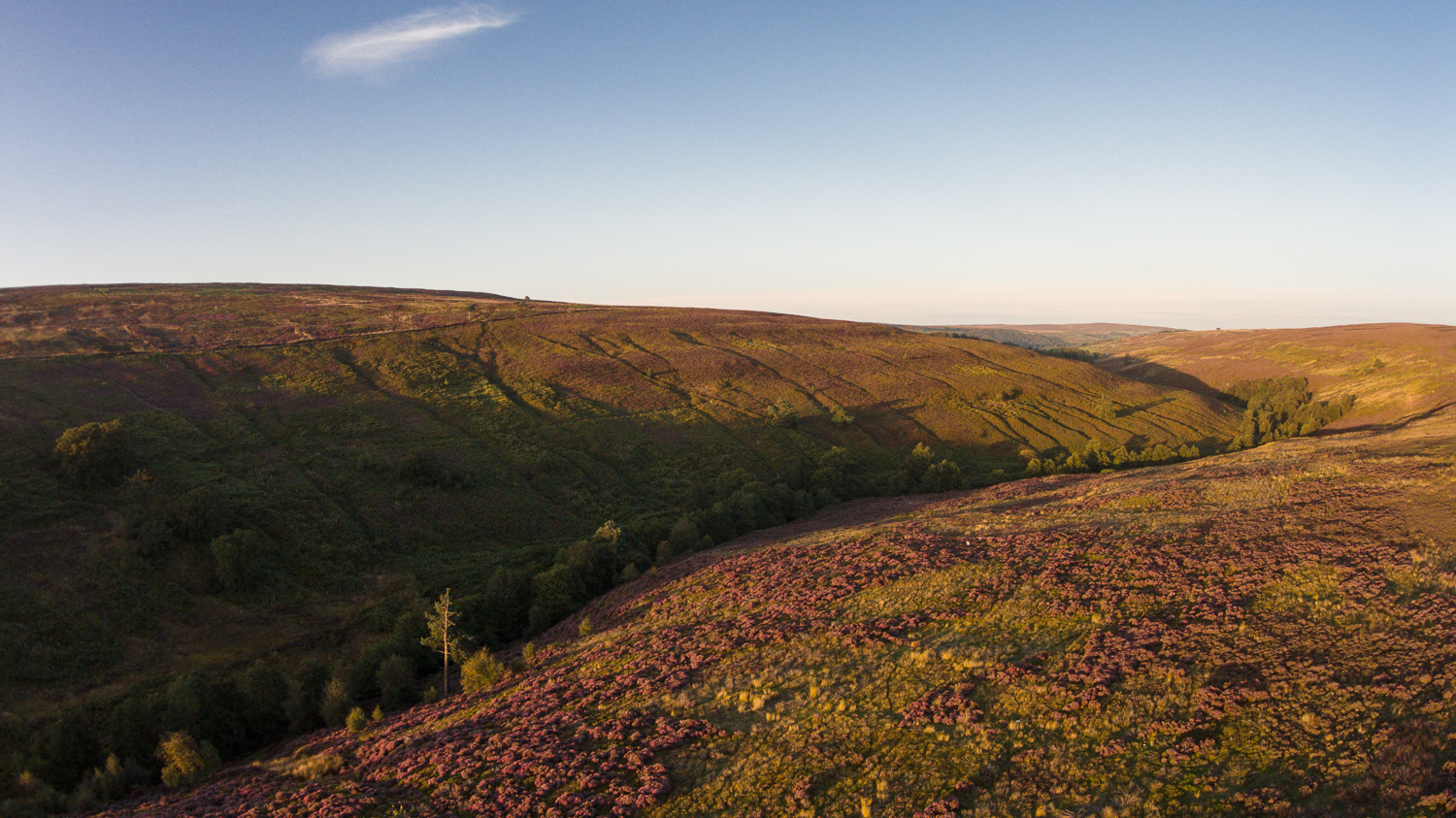
- Baysdale
- Floor elevation: 180 m (590 ft)

Geography
- Location: North Yorkshire
- Country: England
- Coordinates: 54.453°N 1.045°W
- River: Baysdale Beck
- Interactive map of Baysdale

Baysdale is a narrow, secluded side valley of upper Eskdale in North Yorkshire England. The valley, which is 12 miles (19 km) west of Whitby, has been recorded historically as Basedale, Basdale, Bayesdale, and Baysdale. The small settlement that is located on the site of the old priory in the valley is known as Baysdale Abbey. The upper sides of the valley at the southern end used to be the location of several small coal-workings.

== History ==
The land that the valley occupies was once the western part of the combined Lakes of Glaisdale and Eskdale. Flint-head arrows, which have been discovered in Baysdale around the priory, in the valley and on the moor, suggest occupation of the valley by Neolithic people. The name Baysdale is first recorded in 1189 and it derives from a mixture of Old Norse and Old English meaning cowshed valley. Variations include Basedale, Basdale, Bayesdale, and Baysdale. The valley is used mostly for farming, though between c. 1211 and c. 1539, a Cistercian priory (Basedale Priory) was located in the valley. The priory church is recorded to have been 65 feet (20 m) long by 20 feet (6.1 m) wide, and at the time of the Dissolution, it had nine nuns and a prioress, with an annual income of £27 (equivalent to £23,000 in 2025).

Though none of the priory buildings have survived, a grade II listed building in the small settlement called Baysdale (or Basedale) Abbey, has been built on part of the site, and a Medieval bloomery operated by the priory was found on the banks of Baysdale Beck in the 1940s. It was at Baysdale Abbey in 1850 that the last recorded use of a Hand of Glory was documented in North Yorkshire. In the late 19th century the small settlement at Baysdale had a school with an average attendance of 31 children. By the middle of the 20th century, the only registered householders were Viscount Boyne, his baliff, gamekeeper, and shepherd.

The seal of Basedale Priory was a depiction of a seated Virgin (Mary), which was documented in 1323. The priory was a sister convent to Rosedale Priory, and in the 12th century, they employed a local man known as Ralph to act as a guide for the nuns when trekking across the moorland between the two. One story associated with this led to the erection of Ralph Cross, White Cross and Margery Stone when Ralph and two nuns were temporarily lost on Baysdale Moor in a fog. However, Historic England list Ralph Cross as being c. 11th century, which would date it to before the story took place. Any nuns who died during the time that the priory was in use, were buried at Christ Church in nearby Westerdale.

Neither Baysdale or the parish that it is in (Westerdale) are mentioned in the Domesday Book. Historically the valley was part of the wapentake of Langbaurgh. The valley now forms part of the Westerdale Civil Parish and is represented at Westminster as part of the Scarborough & Whitby Constituency. The Cleveland Way runs across Baysdale Moor, while the Esk Valley Walk goes through the dale's lower reaches, and on the northern flank of the dale is the source of the River Leven. Most water in the valley finds its way into Baysdale Beck, which has it source where Grain Beck and Black Beck meet, and then flows northwards into the River Esk. The Baysdale Abbey Bridge carries the road over Black Beck on a single 9-foot (2.7 m) arch, and it is assumed a bridge was on the site when the abbey was running although the parapets date to the 17th century. It is now grade II* listed.

== Geography ==
A side valley of Baysdale, Great Hograh Gill is lined with oak and birch trees and is at an altitude of 720–750 feet (220–230 m). The head of the valley of Baysdale is at its watershed and is known as Burton Howe, being some 1,419 feet (433 m) above sea level. Several small coal mines were dug on the south-eastern side of the valley near Baysdale Moor between the 18th and early 19th centuries. The coal beds are typically 16 inches (40 cm) thick and are part of the Cloughton Formation. Due to its relative isolation in comparison with other valleys which have a road running into and out of them, Baysdale is known to be secluded as it has one dead-end "obscure road".

The dale, which is 12 miles (19 km) west of Whitby, is contained within the parishes of Westerdale, Ingleby Greenhow, and Kildale, and the area is represented at Parliament as part of the Richmond and Northallerton, and the Scarborough and Whitby Constituencies. Baysdale Beck has acted historically as a boundary between civil parishes, and still forms the border separated the civil parishes of Kildale and Westerdale.
