= Colin Raak =

German footballer

Personal information
- Date of birth: 21 April 2000 (age 26)
- Place of birth: Cottbus, Germany
- Height: 1.79 m (5 ft 10 in)
- Position: Midfielder

Team information
- Current team: VfB Krieschow
- Number: 8

Youth career
- 2012–: Energie Cottbus

Senior career*
Years	Team	Apps	(Gls)
2018–2020	Energie Cottbus	5	(0)
2020–	VfB Krieschow	62	(20)
- * Club domestic league appearances and goals as of 21:15, 11 June 2023 (UTC)

Colin Raak (born 21 April 2000) is a German footballer who plays as a midfielder for NOFV-Oberliga Nord club VfB Krieschow.

== Career ==
Raak made his professional debut for Energie Cottbus in the 3. Liga on 26 January 2019, coming on as a half-time substitute for Jonas Zickert in the 2–3 home loss against Wehen Wiesbaden.
