= Bee bole =

Cavity or alcove in a wall for beekeeping

Bee boles in the wall of castle grounds at Tolquhon Castle in Aberdeenshire

A bee bole is a cavity or alcove in a wall (the Scots word bole means a recess in a wall) for beekeeping.

A skep is placed in the bee bole. Before the development of modern bee hives (such as the design published by Lorenzo Langstroth in 1853), the use of bee boles was a practical way of keeping bees in some parts of Britain, although most beekeepers kept their skeps in the open covered by items suitable for the purpose, such as old pots or sacking. The bee bole helped to keep the wind and rain away from the skep and the bees living inside. Beekeeping was a very common activity in the past before sugar became plentiful and affordable as a sweetener. Demand was also high for beeswax for candles, especially from the pre-reformation churches, cathedrals, and abbeys; tithes and rents were often paid in honey and/or beeswax, or even bee swarms.

== Distribution ==
Bee boles and other protective structures for skeps are found across almost the whole of the British Isles, particularly in areas exposed to wind and/or rain, such as eastern Scotland, northern and south-western England, and parts of Wales. Bee boles have also been recorded in certain areas of France (144 sets by 2004), and a few are known to exist elsewhere in Europe. Other names for bee boles include bee holes, bee shells (Cumbria), bee keps (Cumbria), bee niches (Derbyshire), bee walls (Gloucestershire), bee houses (Yorkshire), bee boxes (Kent) and bee garths. The Dolmelynllyn Estate in Gwynedd is home to the highest concentration of bee boles in Wales. There are 46 boles, built in the nineteenth century, likely by the owner of the estate Charles Williams.

== Location at a property ==
The purpose of a bee skep was to house bees so that wax and honey could be obtained. The bees were often kept in gardens or orchards where there were flowers providing nectar and pollen. A further benefit was that the bees pollinated flowers, although this was not discovered until 1750. Among the many walled gardens with bee boles, two fine examples at properties open to the public are: Packwood House, Warwickshire (Register No. 0015) and Brodick Castle on Arran (Register No. 1078).

Bee boles were often built close to the dwelling house so that swarms could be detected and captured quickly; in addition, it helped to familiarise the bees with human presence and activity. Honey was often stolen, so keeping the bees close to the house helped to deter thieves - some bee boles had a padlocked metal bar that served both to prevent theft and to hold in place a wooden board across the front of the bole whilst the bees were overwintering.

Bee boles were most often built in walls facing in southerly or easterly directions (depending on the direction of prevailing winds), so that the bees would be warmed by the morning sun.

== Age of bee boles ==
The oldest surviving bee boles may date from the 12th century, and examples have been recorded from every century after that. The 18th and 19th centuries seem to have been the heyday of bee bole construction, especially on large country house estates, although many were also built on farms or in cottage gardens. The shapes of old bee boles can sometimes be seen in walls where they have been filled in with brick or stone, with only the outline remaining.

== Design and construction of bee boles and bee shelters ==
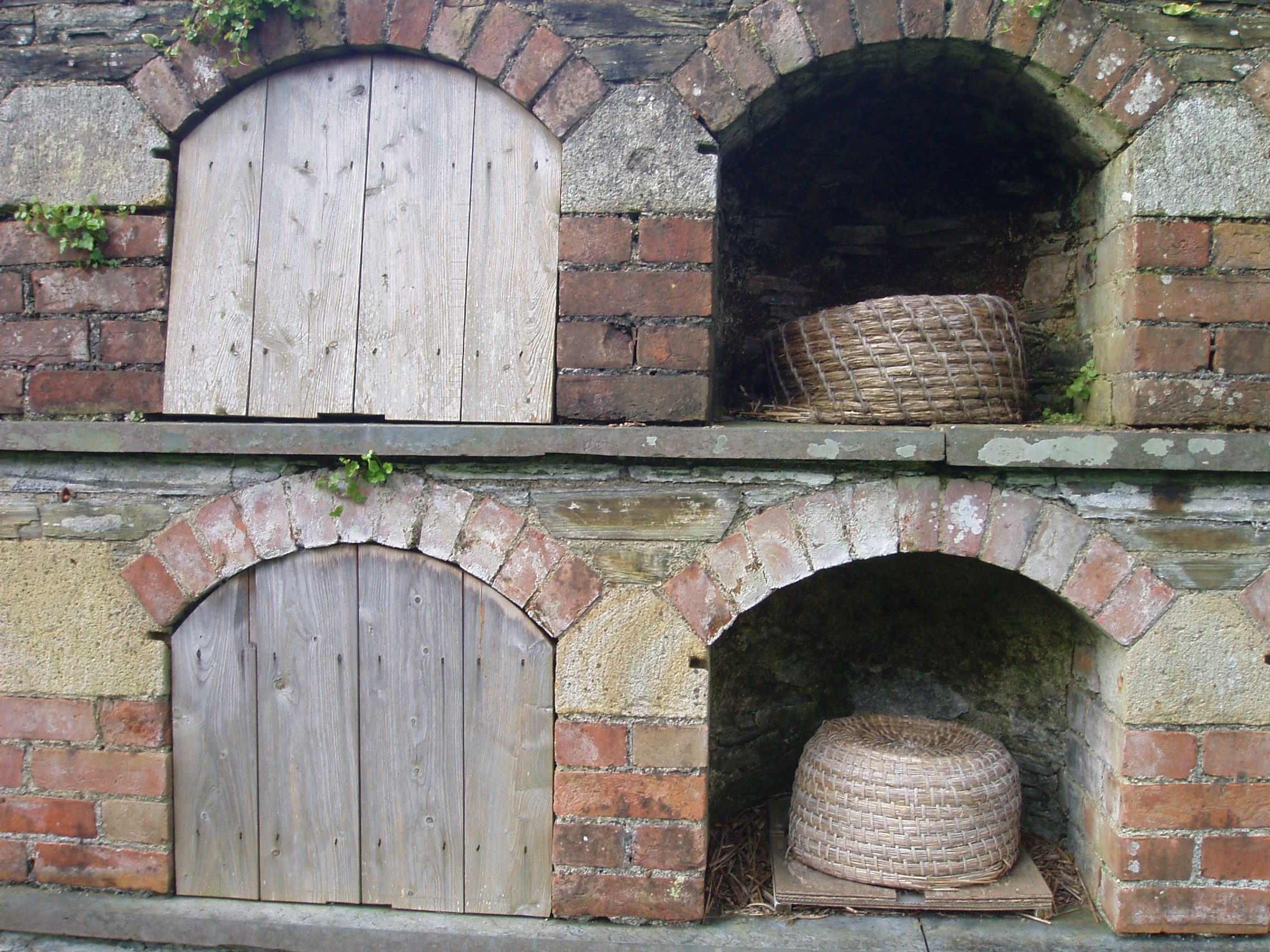
Bee boles containing skeps, at the Lost Gardens of Heligan, Cornwall(Register No. 0356): unusually for southern England, they have doors.

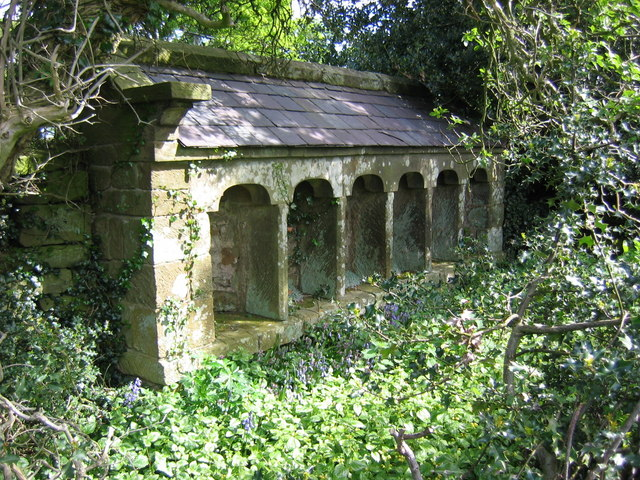
Dale Head Bee Boles

Surviving bee boles are built in stone, brick, or cob walls; some found in sandstone walls have shaped, arched tops. Many stone bee boles are in drystone walls, but others are mortared. Generally, the height and width of a bee bole is between 12 and 18 in (30–45 cm) and the depth is similar or slightly less; those in Scotland tend to be a bit larger as skeps were often wrapped in sacks or dry bracken in the winter (in eastern Scotland, bee boles should not be confused with charter boles, which are generally much smaller.) Brick walls are typically narrower than stone walls, thus bee boles located in brick walls are typically shallower.

The base upon which the skep sits is variable in design - circular, semicircular or square - and occasionally has a protruding lip for the bees to alight upon when they return from foraging. The hole in the skep faces onto this lip. The example at the Queen's Head Inn, Tirril, in the English Lake District, has sandstone slabs placed vertically and horizontally to produce several cavities for skeps. An ornate example set into a wall at Kersland House in Stewarton, Ayrshire, Scotland was an alcove with carved decorations.

Sometimes, larger bee boles, or 'bee alcoves' are found, which would take several skeps.

A bee shelter is a wooden or stone structure, built against a wall or free-standing, with one or more shelves to accommodate several skeps. A Victorian example is The Bee Shelter at Hartpury in Gloucestershire.

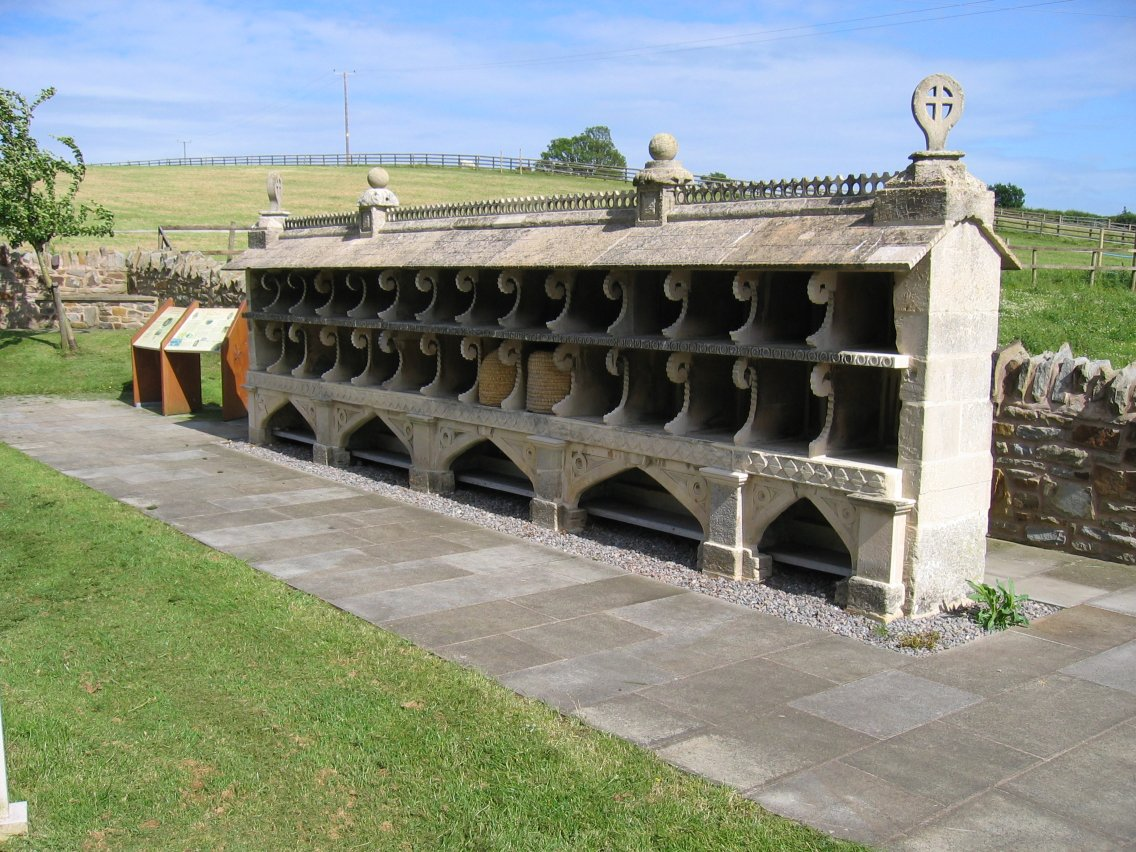
The Bee Shelter at Hartpury, Gloucestershire

With the introduction of the Stewarton hive and Langstroth hives, skeps eventually fell out of use. Bee boles were no longer made and those that survive are sometimes used for decorative purposes; although many people may be unaware of the original purpose of the recesses in the walls of their property, the majority of owners are careful to preserve or even restore their bee boles.

The arrangement of 'hedge alcoves' occasionally seen in formal gardens may be a form of bee bole, such as at Erddig Hall in Clwyd, Wales, although this is not certain.

Some bee boles and other traditional beekeeping structures are part of a listed property, or are listed in their own right. Many examples can be found on the historic buildings websites for England, Scotland, Wales, and Ireland.

== IBRA register ==
The International Bee Research Association (IBRA) maintains a comprehensive record of bee boles in the UK and Republic of Ireland. Started by Dr Eva Crane in 1952, the register contains records for 1560 sites (as at 5 February 2014), and images for most of these. To improve accessibility to the records and to encourage conservation and further recording, the register was put into a database and made available online in 2005. The website also contains a list of publications on bee boles.

== See also ==
- Honey bee life cycle
- Honey bee
- Video - Different types of skeps
