= Tim Häußler =

German footballer (born 1997)

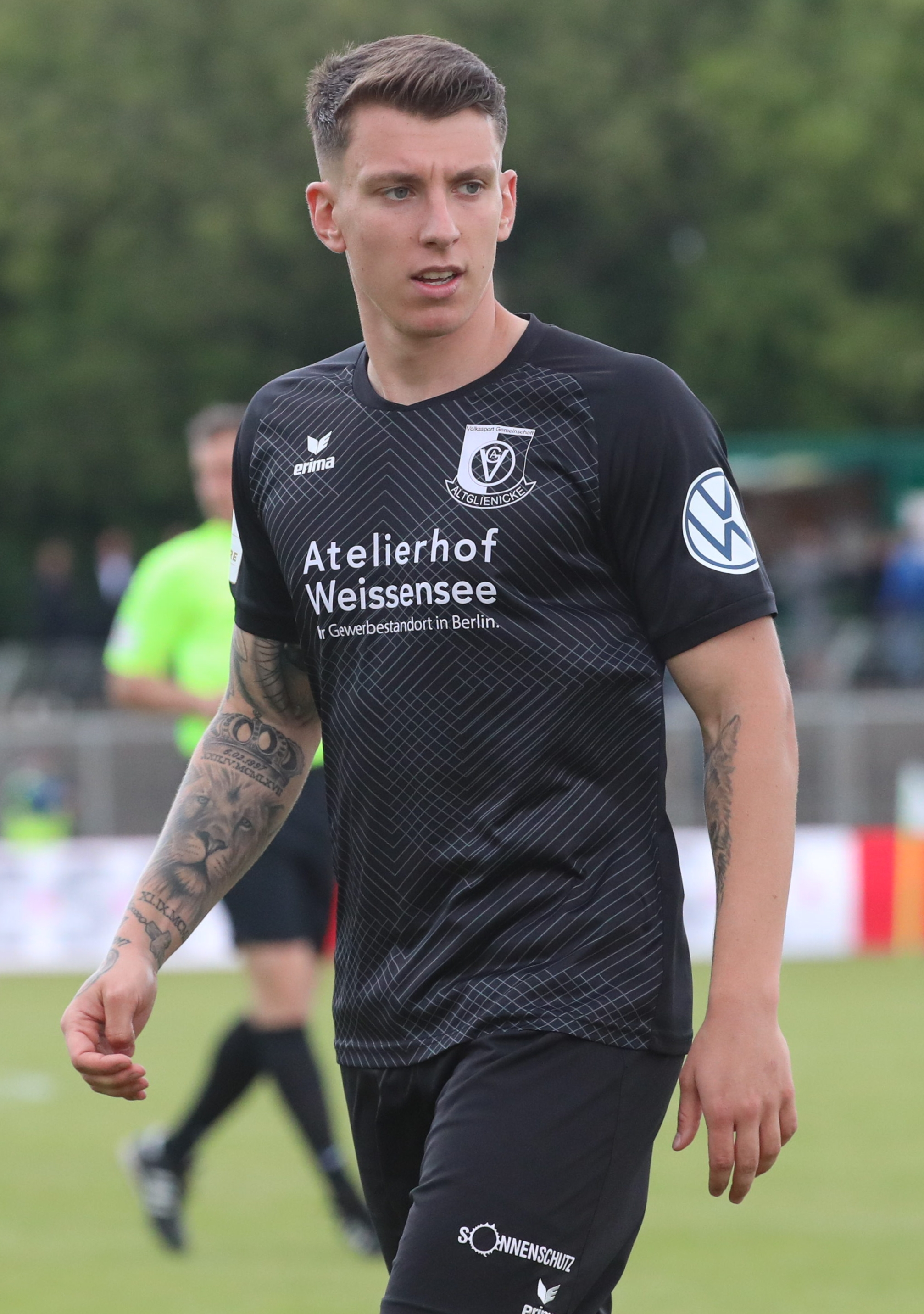

Personal information
- Date of birth: 21 July 1997 (age 29)
- Place of birth: Berlin, Germany
- Height: 1.84 m (6 ft 0 in)
- Position: Full-back

Team information
- Current team: BFC Preussen
- Number: 14

Youth career
- 2002–2006: Sparta Lichtenberg
- 2006–2007: BFC Dynamo
- 2007–2012: Hertha BSC
- 2012–2015: Energie Cottbus

Senior career*
Years	Team	Apps	(Gls)
2015–2016	Energie Cottbus II	3	(0)
2015–2016	Energie Cottbus	2	(0)
2016–2017	Bayern Munich II	11	(1)
2017–2019	Wacker Nordhausen	27	(0)
2019–2020	Union Fürstenwalde	31	(3)
2020–2022	VSG Altglienicke	50	(2)
2022–2024	TuS Makkabi Berlin	44	(3)
2024–	BFC Preussen	0	(0)

International career
2015	Germany U18	1	(0)
- * Club domestic league appearances and goals as of 8 June 2024

Tim Häußler (born 21 July 1997) is a German football full-back who plays for BFC Preussen.

== Club career ==
Häußler began playing football in Hertha BSC in his native city Berlin and moved to Energie Cottbus U-17 in the summer of 2012. He made his professional debut in the 3. Liga on 2 May 2015 against SpVgg Unterhaching. He played 46 minutes of the game, before he was replaced by Jonas Zickert. He has played 2 games for Energie Cottbus since 2015.

== International career ==
He has played 1 game for Germany U-18.

== Career statistics ==
Appearances and goals by club, season and competition
Club	Season	League			DFB-Pokal		Other		Total	
Club	Season	Division	Apps	Goals	Apps	Goals	Apps	Goals	Apps	Goals
Energie Cottbus	2014-15	3. Liga	1	0	0	0	—		1	0
Energie Cottbus	2015-16	3. Liga	1	0	0	0	—		1	0
Energie Cottbus	Total		2	0	0	0	—		2	0
Bayern Munich II	2016–17	Regionalliga Bayern	11	1	—		—		11	1
Wacker 90 Nordhausen	2017–18	Regionalliga Nordost	15	0	—		—		15	0
Career total			28	1	0	0	0	0	28	1
