= Tino Berbig =

German footballer

Personal information
- Full name: Tino Berbig
- Date of birth: 7 October 1980 (age 46)
- Place of birth: Jena, East Germany
- Height: 1.96 m (6 ft 5 in)
- Position: Goalkeeper

Youth career
- 1988–1999: Carl Zeiss Jena

Senior career*
Years	Team	Apps	(Gls)
1999–2004	Carl Zeiss Jena II	60	(1)
1999–2004	Carl Zeiss Jena	64	(0)
2004–2006	VfL Osnabrück	77	(0)
2006–2007	Dynamo Dresden	23	(0)
2007–2011	VfL Osnabrück	100	(0)
2008	VfL Osnabrück II	1	(0)
2011–2015	Carl Zeiss Jena	105	(0)
2015–2018	Wacker Nordhausen	69	(0)
2017–2018	Wacker Nordhausen II	3	(0)
Total		502	(1)

Managerial career
- 2018: Wacker Nordhausen (interim)
- 2019–2020: Wacker Nordhausen (interim)
- * Club domestic league appearances and goals as of 14:28, 2 December 2018 (UTC)

Tino Berbig (born 7 October 1980) is a German former football goalkeeper and current coach and official. With VfL Osnabrück he completed in approximately 62 games in the 2. Bundesliga.

== Career ==
Born in Jena, East Germany, Berbig started his professional career with FC Carl Zeiss Jena. This was followed by his first experiences at the U19 level playing for FC Carl Zeiss Jena before he was brought into the first team in 1999. There he stood between the posts until 2004. For the 2004/05 season he moved to VfL Osnabrück, for whom he played 90 regional league games and four cup games. In July 2006, Berbig changed clubs again and went to Dynamo Dresden, where he only played 24 games that season. While at Dresden, during the season 2006–07, he did not succeed in gaining a position in the starting 11. But as then first choice keeper Frederik Gößling was injured for a while, Berbig started the majority of the league games, before he returned to Osnabrück. He played his first second division game on 21 September 2007 against FC Erzgebirge Aue. After relegation in 2009, Berbig celebrated the championship title in the 3rd division with Osnabrück on 8 May 2010, and therefore promoted back to the 2nd division. After relegation in the 2010/11 season, he did not receive a new contract in Osnabrück. He then kept in shape at his youth club FC Carl Zeiss Jena, where he signed a one-year contract on 20 July 2011. As a first-choice goalkeeper, he played all 38 league games in the 2011–12 season, but had to accept relegation to the Regionalliga Nordost with FC Carl Zeiss. On 8 April 2015, Berbig announced his retirement at the end of the season, but decided in June to continue his career. On 16 June 2015, he signed with club colleague Pierre Becken at FSV Wacker 90 Nordhausen. After 76 competitive appearances for Thuringia, the goalkeeper ended his active career in autumn 2018.

== After his active career ==
Shortly after the end of his career as a player, Berbig was appointed sports director at his last employer, Wacker Nordhausen. Together with Matthias Peßolat, the assistant coach of the first team, he took over the post of head coach on an interim basis in winter 2018 and in winter 2019.

== Notable mentions ==
Berbig was representative of the Regionalliga Nordost in the players' council of the players' union Vereinigung der Vertragsfußballspieler (Association of Contract Football Players) (VdV).
