= Westerdale Hall =

House in Westerdale, North Yorkshire, England

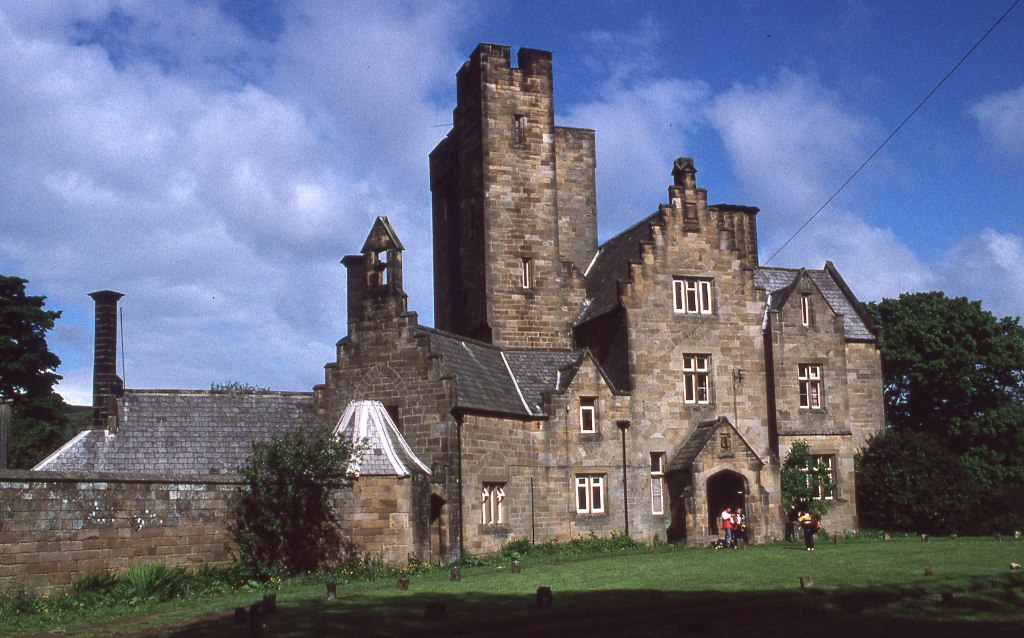
- The building in 1991

- Location within North Yorkshire

General information
- Location: Westerdale, North Yorkshire, England
- Coordinates: 54°26′43″N 0°58′48″W
- Year built: Before 1874
- Client: Charles Duncombe

Listed Building – Grade II
- Official name: Westerdale Hall
- Designated: 20 December 1990
- Reference no.: 1179138

Westerdale Hall is a historic building in Westerdale, a village in North Yorkshire, England.

The building was constructed before 1874, as the hunting lodge of Charles Duncombe. It is in the Scottish baronial style. After the Second World War, it was converted into a youth hostel, and then into a private house. The building was Grade II listed in 1990.

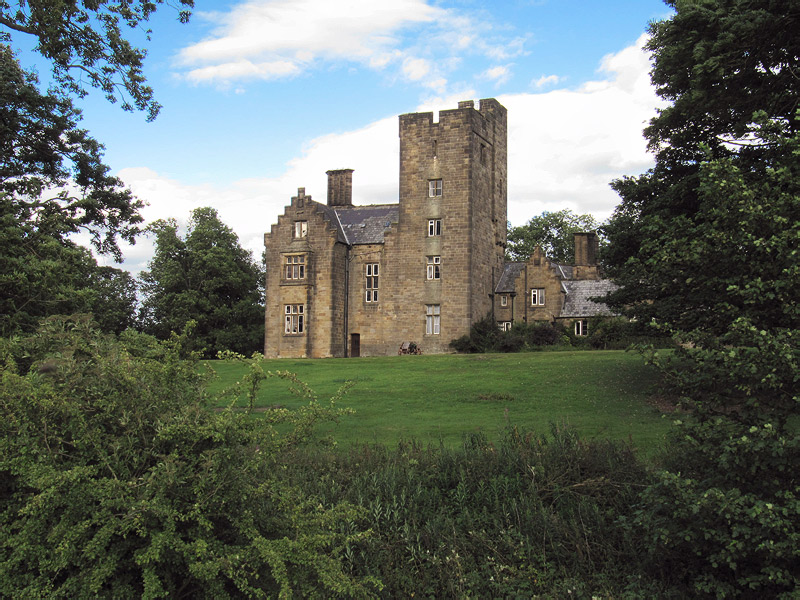
Rear of the building, in 2010

It is constructed in sandstone, with roofs of Lakeland slate and lead, with some crowstepped gables. There is an irregular plan with blocks of between one and five storeys. The windows are mullioned, and some also have transoms. The porch has a Tudor arch with a blank shield above it, and the inner doorway has a Tudor arch. To the left is a screen wall with a Tudor arched doorway and a pavilion with a tented lead roof. At the rear is a stair window, and a massive five-storey embattled tower.

== See also ==
- Listed buildings in Westerdale
