= Thuringian Cup =

Thuringia Cup
- Founded: 1991
- Region: Thuringia, Germany
- Qualifier for: DFB-Pokal
- Current champions: Carl Zeiss Jena (2025–26)
- Most championships: Carl Zeiss Jena (16 titles)

The Thuringia Cup (German: Thüringenpokal) is an annual football competition in Thuringia, Germany. The Thuringia Football Association (German: Thüringer Fußball-Verband, TFV) is its governing body. The cup winner qualifies for next season's DFB-Pokal. It is one of the 21 regional cup competitions in Germany.

== Qualification and competition format ==
All Thuringian clubs competing in 3. Liga, Regionalliga, NOFV-Oberliga Süd, Thüringenliga and Landesklasse Thüringen are eligible to play in the cup. Additionally the winners of the Bezirkspokal competitions qualify. Starting with the 2007–08 season only one team per club may participate.

Thecompetition consists of 6 rounds played in a knock-out format. There is only one match per round, if scores are level after 90 minutes, there is a 2x15 minutes extra time followed by a penalty shootout, if necessary. Fixtures are determined by a draw. Clubs from 3rd Liga and several other teams (determined by a draw) get a first-round bye.

== Finals ==
The finals:

Date	Host city	Winner	Finalist	Result
1991	Gera	SV 1910 Kahla	FV Zeulenroda	4–3 after penalties
1992	Gotha	FSV Wacker 90 Nordhausen	FSV Wismut Gera	2–1
1993	Rudolstadt	FC Carl Zeiss Jena II	SV JENAer Glas	5–3 after penalties
1994	Waltershausen	FC Rot-Weiß Erfurt	1. Suhler SV	4–0
1995	Weida	FC Carl Zeiss Jena	FV Zeulenroda	1–0
1996	Sondershausen	FSV Wacker 90 Nordhausen	FC Rot-Weiß Erfurt	1–0
1997	Heldrungen	FSV Wacker 90 Nordhausen	FC Rot-Weiß Erfurt	3–2
1998	Bad Langensalza	FC Rot-Weiß Erfurt	FSV Wacker 90 Nordhausen	4–1
1999	Suhl	FC Carl Zeiss Jena	FSV Wacker 90 Nordhausen	3–1
2000	Erfurt	FC Rot-Weiß Erfurt	SSV Erfurt Nord	3–1
2001	Gera	FC Rot-Weiß Erfurt	FC Carl Zeiss Jena	2–0
2002	Gotha	FC Rot-Weiß Erfurt	FC Carl Zeiss Jena	7–5 after penalties
2003	Gotha	FC Rot-Weiß Erfurt	FC Carl Zeiss Jena	2–0 a.e.t.
2004	Gotha	FC Carl Zeiss Jena	FC Rot-Weiß Erfurt II	5–3 after penalties
2005	Gera	FC Rot-Weiß Erfurt II	FC Carl Zeiss Jena	7:6 after penalties
2006	Meuselwitz	FC Carl Zeiss Jena	1. FC Gera 03	4–2
2007	Pößneck	1. FC Gera 03	FC Rot-Weiß Erfurt	1–0
2008	Gera	FC Rot-Weiß Erfurt	ZFC Meuselwitz	1–0 a.e.t.
2009	Erfurt	FC Rot-Weiß Erfurt	FC Carl Zeiss Jena	3–2
2010	Pößneck	ZFC Meuselwitz	VfB 09 Pößneck	2–0
2011	Heiligenstadt	ZFC Meuselwitz	1. SC Heiligenstadt	6–5 pen
2012	Meuselwitz	FC Carl Zeiss Jena	ZFC Meuselwitz	2–0
2013	Jena	SV Schott Jena	Rot-Weiß Erfurt	1–0
2014	Jena	FC Carl Zeiss Jena	Rot-Weiß Erfurt	5–0
2015	Meuselwitz	FC Carl Zeiss Jena	ZFC Meuselwitz	2–1 a.e.t.
2016	Jena	FC Carl Zeiss Jena	FC Rot-Weiß Erfurt	2–0
2017	Erfurt	FC Rot-Weiß Erfurt	FSV Wacker 90 Nordhausen	1–0
2018	Erfurt	FC Carl Zeiss Jena	Wismut Gera	5–0
2019	Erfurt	FSV Wacker 90 Nordhausen	Preußen Bad Langensalza	5–0
2020	Jena	FC Carl Zeiss Jena	FSV Martinroda	8–2
2021	Jena	FC Carl Zeiss Jena	FC An der Fahner Höhe	4–1 a.e.t.
2022	Gera	FC Carl Zeiss Jena	ZFC Meuselwitz	1–0
2023	Jena	FC Carl Zeiss Jena	Wacker Nordhausen	4–2
2024	Meuselwitz	FC Carl Zeiss Jena	ZFC Meuselwitz	4–0
2025	Meuselwitz	ZFC Meuselwitz	FC An der Fahner Höhe	3–1
2026	Jena	FC Carl Zeiss Jena	ZFC Meuselwitz	1–0

== Records ==
Record winners are FC Carl Zeiss Jena, having won the title 16 times, followed by FC Rot-Weiß Erfurt (9).

The highest attendance record was set on 15 November 2005 in Erfurt. After rivals FC Rot-Weiß Erfurt and FC Carl Zeiss Jena had only met in the final in the preceding years, they met in the quarter-final of the 2005–06 season. Jena took home a 4–2 penalty shootout win in front of 11,000 spectators.
