= 1. FC Gera 03 =

German football club

Coordinates: 50°50′48″N 12°05′04″E

- Full name: 1. Fußball Club Gera 03 e.V.
- Founded: 2003
- Dissolved: 2012
- Ground: Stadion der Freundschaft
- Capacity: 15,957
- League: Defunct
Home colours	Away colours

1. FC Gera 03 was a German association football club located in Gera, Thuringia. The club withdrew from the NOFV-Oberliga Süd during the 2011–12 season and became defunct.

== History ==
The club was founded in 2003 through the merger of TSV 1880 Gera-Zwötzen and SV 1861 Liebschwitz. The club was made up largely of players who used to play in higher divisions with a large number coming from the two most successful Thuringian clubs, FC Rot-Weiß Erfurt and FC Carl Zeiss Jena. Gera won the Landesliga Thüringen (V) in 2006–07 and gained promotion to the Oberliga. It lasted for three seasons in the Oberliga, was relegated in 2010 and won immediate promotion back up in 2011. The club withdrew from the league during the 2011–12 season for financial reasons, became insolvent and eventually folded.

Gera's most notable success was their advance to the final of the 2007 TFV-Pokal (Thuringian Cup) where they lost to FC Carl Zeiss Jena. Despite their losing appearance, the team still qualified for the 2006–07 DFB-Pokal as Jena had already earned their place in that competition through their promotion to the 2. Bundesliga. Gera hosted 1. FC Kaiserslautern in the opening round and lost 0–2.

1. FC Gera 03 played in the Stadion der Freundschaft which has a capacity of 16,800 spectators. They shared the venue with 1. SV Gera.

The best known footballer to have played for Gera 03 was Marco Weißhaupt, who went on to play in the Bundesliga for Hamburger SV, SC Freiburg, and Hansa Rostock.

The club also had a women's football team, which played at the Regionalliga level.

== Honors ==
The club's honours:

- Thüringenliga:
  - Winners: 2006–07, 2010–11
- Thuringia Cup:
  - Winners: 2006–07
  - Runners-up: 2005–06
