= Oliver Genausch =

German footballer

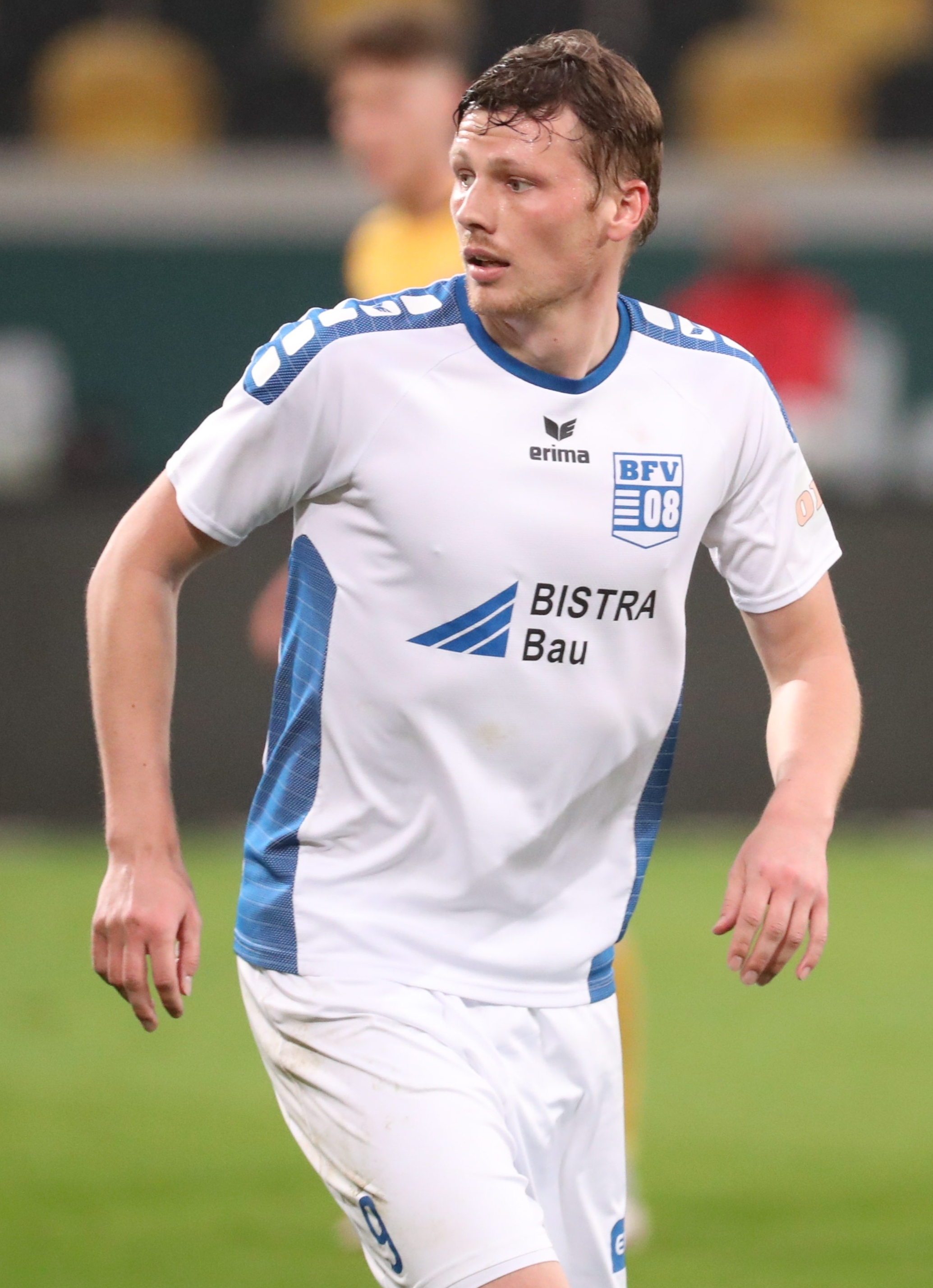
- Oliver Genausch (2021)

Personal information
- Date of birth: 1 June 1991 (age 35)
- Place of birth: Dresden, Germany
- Height: 1.85 m (6 ft 1 in)
- Position: Forward

Team information
- Current team: SC Freital
- Number: 14

Youth career
- –2009: Borea Dresden

Senior career*
Years	Team	Apps	(Gls)
2009–2011	Borea Dresden	50	(10)
2011–2014	Dynamo Dresden II	63	(26)
2014–2017	FSV Zwickau	69	(16)
2017–2020	FSV Wacker 90 Nordhausen	61	(8)
2019	FSV Wacker 90 Nordhausen II	2	(1)
2020	VfB Auerbach	4	(1)
2020–2021	Bischofswerda	8	(0)
2021–	SC Freital	29	(10)
- * Club domestic league appearances and goals as of 12 November 2022

Oliver Genausch (born 1 June 1991) is a German footballer who plays as a forward for NOFV-Oberliga Süd club SC Freital.
