= Hartpury University and Hartpury College =

College in Hartpury, England

Coordinates: 51.907°N 2.230°W

- Hartpury coat of arms
- Motto: Proud to belong
- Type: Further education college and university
- Established: College: 1948; University status: 2018
- Affiliations: UWE (validation of research degrees)
- Chancellor: Martin Clunes
- Principal: Professor Andy Collop
- Students: 4,000
- Location: Hartpury, Gloucestershire, England
- Campus: 360 hectares (890 acres); Rural
- Language: English
- Website: hartpury.ac.uk
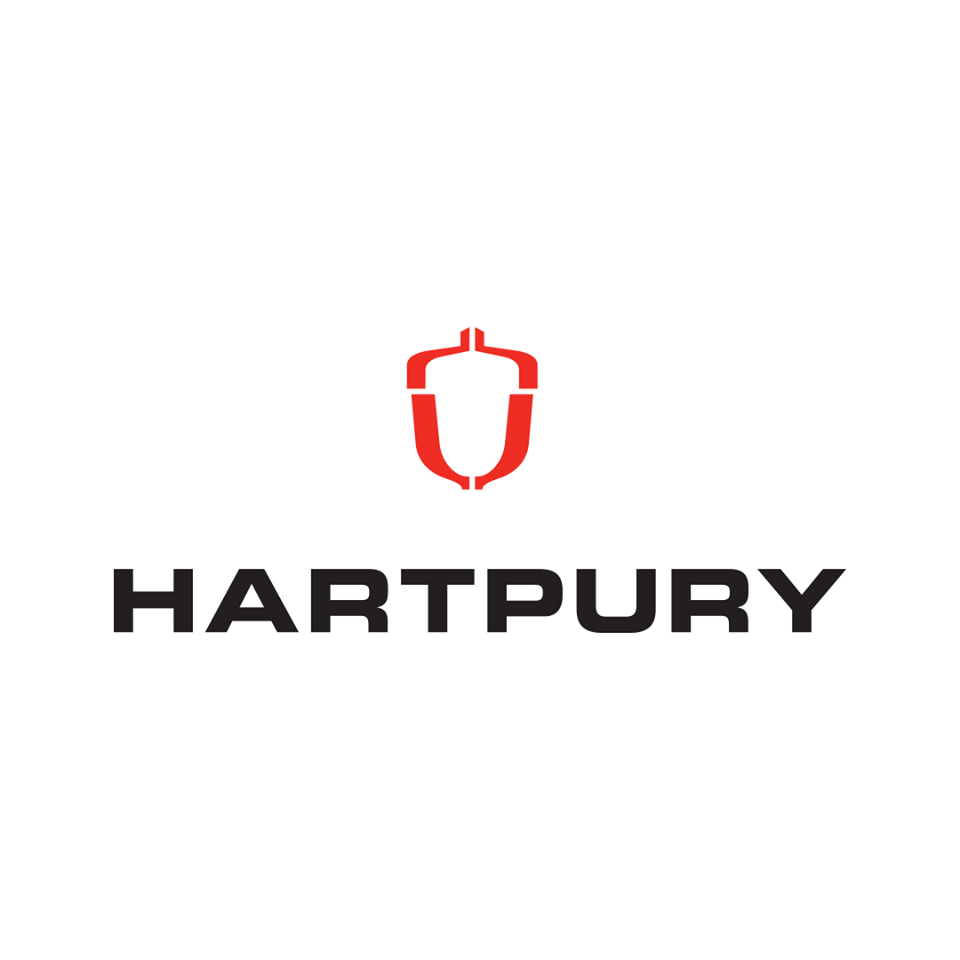

- Location in Gloucestershire

Hartpury University and Hartpury College, formerly Hartpury College, is a provider of further and higher education. The university and college is set in a 360-hectare estate located in Hartpury, near Gloucester, in Gloucestershire, England.

The college offers A-levels, T Levels and vocational diplomas in the land-based and sports sectors.

Hartpury University gained university status in 2018 with Hartpury College of Further Education becoming a subsidiary of the University. The University offers PhDs, and postgraduate and undergraduate degrees in agriculture, animal, equine, sport and veterinary nursing.

== History ==
The college was established in 1948, as an agricultural college with 50 students.

The House and Farm were purchased for £47,000 and converted into educational facilities.

The first female students enrolled at the college in 1953 to study general courses covering farming, poultry, horticulture, and beekeeping. In the 1990s, the college introduced the National Certificate in the management of horses, a BTEC First Diploma in agriculture, animal care and rural leisure courses. The college introduced its first higher education programme in equine studies in 1992. The following year, the college became an independent, self-governing corporation run by a board of governors and directorate. It introduced its degree programme in 1994.

Hartpury's link with the University of the West of England (UWE) began in 1997 when Hartpury was awarded associate faculty status. In 1999, the college introduced degrees in Veterinary Nursing Science, Equine Business Management and a master's degree programme in Equine Science, which UWE validated .It accepted its first PhD student in 2004. In 2017, Hartpury was granted 'Taught Degree Awarding Powers' (TDAP), and in the same year was awarded the Teaching Excellence Framework Gold award.

== University ==
Hartpury College gained full university status in 2018 and changed its name to Hartpury University and Hartpury College. Today, the institution offers undergraduate and postgraduate courses to higher education level students based in the UK and overseas.

In February 2024, actor Martin Clunes was named as the inaugural Chancellor for both Hartpury University and Hartpury College.

== Academic profile ==
It offers Undergraduate and postgraduate courses via five departments. Its courses fall under the following subject areas.

- Agriculture
- Animal
- Business
- Equine
- Sport
- Veterinary Nursing

=== Reputation and rankings ===
Rankings
National rankings
- Times / Sunday Times (2026): 116

In The Times and The Sunday Times Good University Guide, Hartpury University ranked thirteenth in the South West and 112th nationally.

The Times University guides placed the university in its top ten universities for teaching quality and top twenty for student experience in 2023 and 2024.

It began contributing to the UK's National Research Excellence Framework in 2021. Its research focuses on sport and exercise sciences, particularly in equestrian studies, due to its water treadmill's provision.

In 2023, Hartpury University was awarded Gold in all three areas of the Teaching Excellence Framework (TEF) - Overall, Student Experience, and Student Outcomes.

Ofsted rated Hartpury College outstanding in all areas for academic and curriculum-related provision. In August 2023, they achieved an A-level pass rate of 98.4% and a 99.4% pass rate for BTEC diploma students.

The 2023 Graduate Outcomes survey showed that 97% of Hartpury University graduates were employed, further study, or engaged in purposeful activity.

The university has received awards for its teaching provision, ranking as the number one English mainstream university for teaching in the National Student Survey (NSS) 2022, and in first place for lecturers and teaching quality at the Whatuni Student Choice Awards 2022.

== Campus ==
The Bee Shelter, Hartpury formerly stood in the grounds of the college. The Victorian structure, known as a bee bole, was moved to the churchyard and is a Grade II* listed building. Hartpury's campus covers 360 hectares. It includes a 296-cubicle dairy unit and a dairy parlour. In 2023, the university invested £12.75 million into a library and study area named the University Learning Hub. It has also invested £5.8 million in a veterinary nursing centre.

=== Hartpury Sports Academy ===
Dame Katherine Grainger opened the university's sports academy in 2019. It has a double sports hall with performance analysis cameras, a rehabilitation suite, human performance and biomechanics laboratories; therapy suites, a performance analysis suite with an assessment and testing laboratory; an altitude chamber with an anti-gravity treadmill; power, cross-training and performance gyms; and 3G-surfaced rugby and football pitches with integrated cameras.

=== Hartpury Equine ===
Facilities include a rider performance centre, equine therapy centre, competition arenas and stabling for 230 horses. The Margaret Giffen Centre for Rider Performance has three Racewood manufactured horse-riding simulators. Its eventing simulator allows riders to experience dressage, cross-country or show jumping movements. Its racing simulator allows jockeys to work on their techniques and the centre also has a basic simulator for novices. Facilities in the Equine Therapy Centre include a water treadmill, high-speed treadmill and ground schooling arenas to support rehabilitation and performance analysis.

=== Home farm ===
Home Farm is a commercial farm located on the campus and is used by the university's and college's students. The farm raises cows, calves, sheep and manages arable land. Its facilities include a dairy bull-beef rearing unit, a 296-cubicle dairy unit, and a 30/30 GEA rapid exit parlour. The university's farming operations supply companies like Sainsbury's, Müller, and Glencore.

=== Hartpury agri-tech centre ===
The centre was opened in 2020 by National Farmers' Union President Minette Batters. The centre's facilities grant farmers, and students at agricultural institutions and organisations access to smart farming technologies.

== Sport ==
=== Academies ===
The institution has ten sports academies.

- Equine
- Women's Rugby
- Men's Rugby
- Women's Football
- Men's Football
- Rowing
- Golf
- Netball
- Athlete Performance
- Modern Pentathlon

=== Rugby union ===
Hartpury University and Hartpury College is known for its development of rugby players, with many former students playing at the highest level.

Hartpury University is the only UK university to have a team playing in Champ Rugby. The institution is also home to Gloucester-Hartpury, the unified women's team of Gloucester Rugby and Hartpury University RFC. Gloucester Hartpury won the Premiership Women's Rugby in 2022/23, 2023-24 and 2024-25.

=== Football ===
In 2020, the institution launched its first non-league football club Hartpury University FC. The squad comprises players from the academies at Hartpury University and Hartpury College. In 2022, the team won the Herefordshire FA County League Premiership Division and were promoted to the Hellenic League One.

=== Rowing ===
In 2010 Gloucester Rowing Club and Hartpury College set up a centre to enable Hartpury students to participate in one of the Great Britain's rowing team centres. Students at the time were members of the Gloucester RC and used its rowing facilities. In return the senior rowers from the club used the training facilities at the college. The relationship has brought significant success at national and international level. In 2021 Hartpury formed its own Hartpury University and College Boat Club.

=== Equine ===
Hartpury University and Hartpury College host three annual events Hartpury Festival of Dressage, Hartpury Showjumping Spectacular and Hartpury Horse Trials. In additional the facilities are used for a number of affiliated and unaffiliated competitions and shows. Standout events held at the facilities have included in 1994 World Championships for Disabled Riders., in 2000 the venue was selected to host all three disciplines of the European Young Rider Championships. In more recent years in 2022 the venue hosted the International Federation for Equestrian Sports (FEI) Dressage and Evening European Championships for Young Riders and Juniors.

== Alumni association ==
The college has an alumni association, with membership extending to former students from both Further and Higher Education programmes, as well as current and former members of staff.

=== Chancellor and honorary degree holders ===
Martin Clunes was appointed the inaugural Chancellor of Hartpury University and Hartpury College in February 2024.

- Lyn Dance
- Anne McBride
- Mel Nicholls
- Alfred Morris
- Graham van der Lely
- Nick Gazzard Imran Atcha
- Malcolm Wharton
- Abdul Majeed Waris
- Carl Hester
- Mark Davison
- Jane Holderness-Roddam
- Martin Baber – posthumous award

== 2017 student expulsion ==
In June 2017, the college expelled one student and suspended several others following a police investigation into images circulated online and on social media depicting students from Hartpury College apparently killing a fox cub and posing with a dead cat.

The college and Gloucestershire police both issued statements concluding they were satisfied the killing of the fox was not an act of cruelty, and that one of the students, who was training as a gamekeeper, had killed the animal to end its suffering after it had been hit by road traffic. The police declined to take further action.

== Coat of arms ==
The coat of arms was granted to Hartpury University in 2019. The shield is at the centre has three red acorns that symbolise their students' growth and development. The black chevron contains a gold book encircled by a wreath of olive leaves. The book denotes lifelong learning, and the wreath symbolises the university's sporting accomplishments. The crest sits above the shield and features a black boar holding a red acorn, that represents their agricultural history and specialism. The horses holding either side of the shield represent Hartpury's interests in equine education, research and commerce. The institution's motto, 'Proud to Belong' sits below the shield.
