= Dino Medjedovic =

Bosnian footballer (born 1989)

Dino Medjedović
Personal information
- Full name: Dino Medjedović
- Date of birth: 13 June 1989 (age 37)
- Place of birth: Sarajevo, SFR Yugoslavia
- Height: 1.85 m (6 ft 1 in)
- Position: Attacking midfielder

Team information
- Current team: SV Bad Schallerbach

Youth career
- 1995–1999: SK Admira Linz
- 1999–2002: LASK Linz
- 2002–2003: SV Ried
- 2004–2007: LASK Linz

Senior career*
Years	Team	Apps	(Gls)
2007–2009	AGOVV	24	(4)
2009–2010	Karviná	4	(0)
2010–2011	BW Linz	25	(7)
2012–2013	SC 07 Idar-Oberstein	28	(10)
2013–2014	TSG Neustrelitz	32	(19)
2014–2016	VfL Wolfsburg II	38	(26)
2016–2017	SC Paderborn	12	(3)
2017	KF Shkëndija	14	(6)
2017–2018	Aris Limassol	10	(1)
2018–2019	Wacker Nordhausen	15	(3)
2018–2020	Wacker Nordhausen II	15	(5)
2020	ATSV Stadl-Paura	9	(4)
2021–	SV Bad Schallerbach		
- * Club domestic league appearances and goals as of 22:32, 29 December 2020 (UTC)

Dino Medjedović (born 13 June 1989) is a Bosnian footballer who plays as forward for Austrian OÖ Liga side SV Bad Schallerbach.

== Club career ==
Medjedović was born in Sarajevo, and came to Austria with his family. His football career began in the youth divisions of SK Admira Linz and LASK Linz. At 18, he joined the AGOVV Apeldoorn in Eerste Divisie the Dutch second division. In the Jupiler League, he played 20 games and scored a goal between 2007 and 2009. In the 2009–10 season, he played for MFK Karvina of Czech 2. Liga the second division in the Czech Republic. In 2010, he returned to Austria and joined the FC Blau-Weiß Linz from the Austrian Regional League Central.

2012 Medjedovic went to Germany and played for SC 07 Idar-Oberstein in the Regionalliga Südwest. He moved TSG Neustrelitz in the Regionalliga Nordost in 2013. He plays VfL Wolfsburg's second team in the Regionalliga Nord.

== Career statistics ==
Appearances and goals by club, season and competition
Club	Season	League			Cup		Continental		Other		Total	
Club	Season	Division	Apps	Goals	Apps	Goals	Apps	Goals	Apps	Goals	Apps	Goals
AGOVV Apeldoorn	2007–08	Eerste Divisie	10	0	1	0	—		0	0	11	0
AGOVV Apeldoorn	2008–09	Eerste Divisie	10	4	0	0	—		0	0	10	4
AGOVV Apeldoorn	Total		20	4	1	0	—		0	0	21	4
MFK Karviná	2009–10	Czech 2. Liga	4	0	0	0	—		0	0	4	0
Blau-Weiß Linz	2010–11	Austrian Regional League Central	25	7	2	0	—		0	0	27	7
SC 07 Idar-Oberstein	2012–13	Regionalliga Südwest	28	10	—		—		0	0	28	10
TSG Neustrelitz	2013–14	Regionalliga Nordost	31	19	1	0	—		2^{1}	0	32	19
VfL Wolfsburg II	2014–15	Regionalliga Nord	16	9	—		—		0	0	16	9
VfL Wolfsburg II	2015–16	Regionalliga Nord	22	17	—		—		0	0	22	17
VfL Wolfsburg II	Total		38	26	0	0	—		2	0	38	26
Career total			146	67	4	0	—		2	0	150	67

- 1. Promotion rounds to 3. Liga.
