= Dale Head Bee Boles =

Structure in North Yorkshire, England

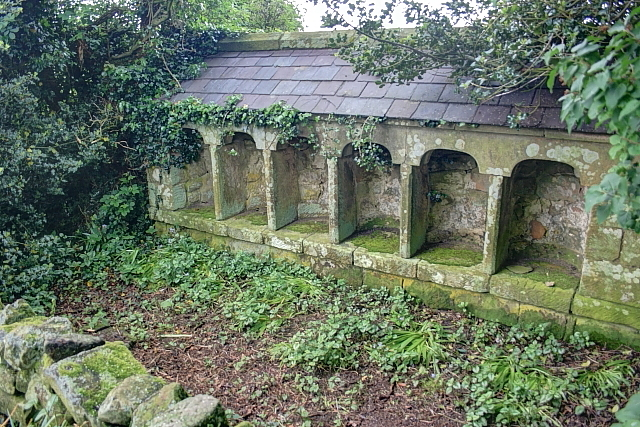
- The structure in 2014

- Location within North Yorkshire

General information
- Location: Westerdale, North York Moors, England
- Coordinates: 54°17′47″N 1°57′07″W
- Year built: 1832
- Renovated: 1983 (restored)

Listed Building – Grade II*
- Official name: Bee house to west of Dale Head Farmhouse and wall to left
- Designated: 20 December 1990
- Reference no.: 1316282

The Dale Head Bee Boles are a historic structure in Westerdale, a valley in the North York Moors, England.

The apiary was constructed in 1832, at Dale Head Farm. The series of alcoves were used to shelter straw beehives over winter. Bee boles like this are found in various locations in Britain and Ireland, but are locally rare. The structure was restored in 1983 by the North York Moors National Park Authority, and a bronze plaque was added to commemorate this. The structure was Grade II* listed in 1990.

The bee shelter is constructed of sandstone on a plinth with a coping band, an eaves band, and a roof of purple Lakeland slate with a stone ridge and copings and moulded kneelers. There is one low storey, and it contains an arcade of six shouldered segmental arches with slabs between them. To the left is a short stretch of low wall continuing the inscribed bronze plaque.

== See also ==
- Grade II* listed buildings in North Yorkshire (district)
- Listed buildings in Westerdale
