= Benjamin Kauffmann =

German footballer

Personal information
- Date of birth: 14 July 1988 (age 38)
- Place of birth: Ingolstadt, West Germany
- Height: 1.73 m (5 ft 8 in)
- Position: Winger

Team information
- Current team: Bayern Munich U17 (assistant)

Youth career
- TSV Ingolstadt Nord
- –2006: TSV 1860 München

Senior career*
Years	Team	Apps	(Gls)
2006–2008	Wacker Burghausen II		
2008–2011	FC Ingolstadt 04 II	86	(14)
2010–2011	FC Ingolstadt 04	1	(0)
2011–2013	SV Babelsberg 03	42	(4)
2013–2014	SpVgg Unterhaching	17	(1)
2014	Goslarer SC	6	(2)
2014–2015	Eintracht Bamberg	19	(0)
2015–2016	Wacker Burghausen	37	(4)
2016–2019	Wacker Nordhausen	87	(9)
2019–2022	FC Pipinsried	27	(3)

Managerial career
- 2026–: Bayern Munich U17 (assistant)
- * Club domestic league appearances and goals as of 21 May 2022

Benjamin Kauffmann (born 14 July 1988) is a German former professional footballer who played as a winger, and currently works as an assistant coach at Bayern Munich U17.

== Career ==
After playing in 1860 Munich's youth team, Kauffmann played for the reserve team of two Bavarian clubs, Wacker Burghausen, and later FC Ingolstadt 04. At Ingolstadt he was given his senior debut, playing for the first-team in a 2. Bundesliga match against Hertha BSC at the Olympiastadion in October 2010. He came on as a substitute for Moritz Hartmann for the last seven minutes of a 3–1 defeat to the eventual champions.

Kauffmann signed for Potsdam club SV Babelsberg 03 in July 2011. He scored in each of his first two appearances, and made 42 appearances for the club in eighteen months before he returned to Bavaria in January 2013 to sign for SpVgg Unterhaching. A year later he signed for Goslarer SC.
