= The Bee Shelter, Hartpury =

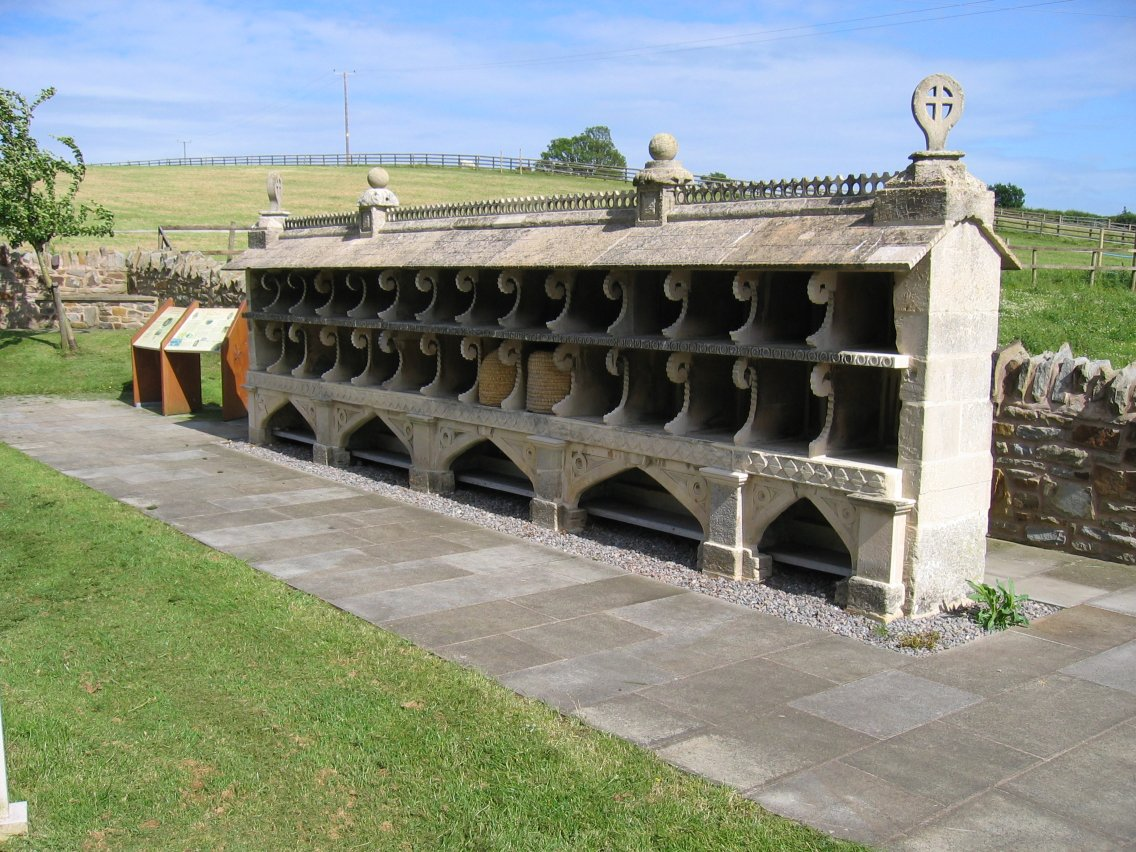
- "a remarkable Neo-Jacobean beehive shelter"

- Location within Gloucestershire
- 51.911°N 2.3193°W
- Type: Bee shelter
- Location: Hartpury, Forest of Dean, Gloucestershire

History
- Built: c.1840

Site notes
- Architectural style: Jacobethan
- Governing body: Privately owned

Listed Building – Grade II*
- Official name: Bee Shelter Approximately 50 Metres East of St Mary the Virgin
- Designated: 18 October 1985
- Reference no.: 1341879

The Bee Shelter, Hartpury, Forest of Dean, Gloucestershire, England, is a 19th-century bee shelter. It is a Grade II* listed structure.

== History and description ==
The bee shelter was originally located in Nailsworth and was moved to the grounds of Hartpury College in 1968, before being relocated to the churchyard of St Mary's Church in 2002. Until the late 20th century, the beehive shelter was believed to date from the early 17th century and that it functioned as a beehive rack. Recent research has confirmed that it was constructed in the 19th century as a bee shelter by the stonemason Paul Tuffley, a member of a prominent Gloucestershire family of masons, stone merchants and quarrymasters. The date can be confirmed by the stone tooling marks on the shelter, which are "typically Victorian" and by the reference made to the shelter in a deed dating from 1852.

The shelter is 7.3m long and 2.1m high, and comprises three tiers of shelving separated by pilasters. The structure is elaborately decorated.
