= SpVgg Geratal =

German sports club

- Full name: Spielvereinigung Geratal eV Geschwenda/Geraberg
- Founded: 2010 April 12; 16 years ago
- Ground: Saveway Arena
- Capacity: 2,000
- Manager: Frank Schwalenberg
- League: Thüringenliga (VI)
- Website: Website

SpVgg Geratal is a German association football club based in Geratal, Thuringia. The team currently plays in the Thüringenliga, a sixth tier of the German football league system.

== History ==
SpVgg Geratal was established on 12 April 2010 as a merger between SV 08 Geraberg and ThSV 1886 Geschwenda. Within a few weeks, TSV 1880 Elgersburg also merged with the club, but separated into its own club again following the 2010/2011 season.

== Stadium ==
The club plays its home matches at the 2,000-seat Saveway Arena in Geratal.
