= Listed buildings in Westerdale =

Westerdale is a civil parish in the county of North Yorkshire, England. It contains 25 listed buildings that are recorded in the National Heritage List for England. Of these, four are listed at Grade II*, the middle of the three grades, and the others are at Grade II, the lowest grade. The parish contains the village of Westerdale and the surrounding countryside and moorland. Most of the listed buildings are houses, cottages and associated structures, farmhouses and farm buildings, and the others include two wayside crosses, a bridge, a guidestone, a monument and a church.

== Key ==
Grade	Criteria
II*	Particularly important buildings of more than special interest
II	Buildings of national importance and special interest

== Buildings ==
Name and location	Photograph	Date	Notes	Grade
Old Ralph Cross; 54.40893°N 0.96273°W		11th century (possible)	The wayside cross is in gritstone, and is about 6 feet (1.8 m) in height. It has a roughly-shaped base, and a monolith cross with weathered interlace decoration. The cross has been broken in one place and repaired.	II*
Young Ralph Cross; 54.40993°N 0.95813°W		11th century (possible)	The wayside cross is in gritstone, and is about 10 feet (3.0 m) in height. It has a roughly-shaped base, and the lower part has much-weathered interlace ornament and a cable-moulded border.	II*
Baysdale Abbey Bridge; 54.45263°N 1.04463°W		Medieval	The bridge, which carries a road over Black Beck, is in stone. It consists of a single arch with a strengthening arch below and an internal plinth. There is a moulded band under the parapet, which dates probably from the 17th century. The bridge has a roughly serpentine plan, ending in piers with square domed caps on swept bases.	II*
Baysdale Abbey; 54.45168°N 1.04377°W		17th century	A large farmhouse, mostly dating from 1822, it is in stone and has a Welsh slate roof with a stone ridge and coping. There are two storeys and a total of 14 bays. The main section has five bays, to the right are three more bays, to the left is a projecting stair bay, and further to the left are two older bays. On the second bay of the main section is a doorway with a panelled reveal, an architrave and a radial fanlight, above which are two initialled datestones. Most of the windows are sashes, some horizontally sliding, and the stair bay has a pointed-arched window. At the extreme left is a bay with a porch containing a doorway with a gabled hood and Tudor arched windows.	II
Riddings Farmhouse; 54.43482°N 0.98322°W		Late 17th century (possible)	Originally a longhouse, later a farmhouse, it is in sandstone, and has a pantile roof and a stone ridge, gable coping, and curved kneelers. There are two storeys and four bays, and a later lower one-bay extension to the right. On the front are two porches, one gabled. One window is a horizontally sliding sash, and the others are modern casements.	II
Guidestone; 54.45800°N 0.95471°W		Early 18th century (probable)	The guidestone, near Birk Field Quarry, is in gritstone, about 2 feet (0.61 m) in height, and has a plinth, a shaft and a slightly-projecting head. There are inscribed place names on the north and south faces, and on the west face are two pointing hands.	II
Westland; 54.44469°N 0.97723°W	—	Early 18th century	The house is in sandstone, and has a pantile roof with stone gable copings and square kneelers. There are two storeys and three bays. On the front is a gabled porch, to its left is a garage door, and the windows are sashes, those on the ground floor with heavy lintels.	II
Bulmer's Monument; 54.44180°N 0.97444°W	—	1727	The monument stands in the garden of a house, and commemorates Thomas Bulmer, a sailor. It is in gritstone on a large square plinth. The monument has a plain stepped base, and a square stepped shaft, with a relief carving of a lifeboat on each face of the step, and a stepped top, with a socket for a missing finial. The main shaft has round pilasters, and segmental arches with keystones, each arch containing an inscribed panel.	II
Keepers Cottage and Hill House; 54.42803°N 1.00149°W	—	Early to mid-18th century	A house divided into two, in sandstone on a plinth, with a pantile roof, a stone ridge, copings, and curved kneelers. There are two storeys and six bays. On the front are two doorways, one with a blocked fanlight, and the windows are casements.	II
Anthony House; 54.42676°N 0.95941°W		Mid-18th century (probable)	A longhouse in stone with a pantile roof, stone coping and kneelers. There is one storey and a loft. It contains doorways, slit vents, and windows including a two-light mullioned window at the rear.	II
Duncombe Farmhouse and cottage 54.44458°N 0.97638°W	—	Mid-18th century	A farmhouse and two cottages, later a house and a cottage, in sandstone on a plinth, with sprocketed eaves, and pantile roofs with a stone ridge, gable copings and square kneelers. There are two storeys and six bays. Each part has a doorway with a fanlight, the cottage on the left has pivoted casement windows, and the house has sash windows.	II
Hawthorn House; 54.44470°N 0.99337°W		18th century	The farmhouse is in sandstone on a two-stage plinth, and has a pantile roof with stone copings and square kneelers. There are two storeys and two bays, and a single-storey rear extension on the left. The main range contains casement windows, and the extension has a Welsh slate roof, a doorway and a sash window.	II
Hollins Farmhouse; 54.44091°N 0.95560°W		18th century	The farmhouse is in sandstone, and has a pantile roof with stone copings and kneelers. It is in three parts; on the right is a single bay with one storey, to its left is a two-storey two-bay block, and further to the left is a taller extension with two storeys and two bays. At the rear is a two-storey right wing and a single-storey left wing. The doorway has a fanlight, the windows on the front are sashes, and all have tall wedge lintels. At the rear is an arched stair window, on the right return is a re-set datestone, and the rear wings contain varied windows.	II
Kirk Vue and The Cottage; 54.44353°N 0.97550°W	—	18th century	Three, later two, cottages in sandstone, with a pantile roof, a stone ridge, gable copings and square kneelers. There are two storeys and three bays, and a two-story gabled rear outshut behind the left bay. On the front are three doorways, and the windows are sashes, those at the rear horizontally sliding.	II
Low House; 54.45413°N 0.95244°W		18th century	The house is in sandstone, and has pantile roofs with stone copings and kneelers. There are two storeys and two bays, and a long rear wing extending along the road. On the front is a casement window replacing a doorway, and horizontally sliding sash windows. The wing contains replaced windows and a re-set dated and initialled lintel, and the entrance is at the rear.	II
Farm buildings north of Baysdale Abbey; 54.45221°N 1.04327°W	—	Late 18th century (possible)	The barn, stables and cart shed are in sandstone, and have hipped pantile roofs with stone copings and circular kneelers. There are three ranges forming a U-shaped plan, and an extension to the east. The north range has two storeys and contains a barn, and the other ranges have one storey. In the middle range is a round-arched entrance with impost blocks, voussoirs and a dated keystone. Elsewhere, there are doorways and various types of windows.	II
Box House; 54.44544°N 0.97801°W		Late 18th century	The house is in sandstone, and has a pantile roof with a stone ridge, gable copings and kneelers. There are two storeys and two bays. In the centre is a doorway, and the windows are sashes, those on the ground floor with extended lintels and keystones.	II
Hill Garth; 54.44313°N 0.97515°W	—	Late 18th century	The house is in stone, and has a pantile roof with a stone ridge, copings and square kneelers. There are two storeys and three wide bays. The doorway and the windows, which are sashes, have heavy lintels and false voussoirs. On the left bay is a blocked doorway and a blocked slit vent.	II
Front garden wall, Hill Garth; 54.44309°N 0.97534°W	—	Late 18th century (probable)	The wall running along the front of the house is in coursed squared tooled sandstone with ogee raised coping.	II
Former Post Office and cottages 54.44469°N 0.97659°W	—	Late 18th century	A house and a cottage, later three cottages, in sandstone, with sprocketed eaves, and pantile roofs with stone copings, one square kneeler and one deep pointed kneeler. There are two storeys and five bays. On the front are three doorways, two of the windows are sashes and the others are casements.	II
Byre west of Hill House; 54.42817°N 1.00249°W	—	1793	The byre with a hayloft above is in sandstone, with stone dressings, and a purple slate roof with stone copings and square kneelers. There are two storeys and five bays. It contains two doorways with lintels cut to resemble voussoirs, one dated, three pitching doors, and a slit vent.	II
Farm buildings southwest of Hawthorn House; 54.44438°N 0.99338°W	—	Early 19th century (probable)	The byre, stable and cart shed with haylofts are in sandstone with Welsh slate roofs. They form two ranges with an L-shaped plan. The main range contains stable doors, windows and a pitching door. At the south end is a link with two doorways to a three-bay cart shed. This contains three cart arches with heavy lintels and canted corners, and there are two doors under the eaves.	II
Bee house and wall, Dale Head Farmhouse; 54.43091°N 0.95677°W		1832	The bee shelter is in sandstone on a plinth with a coping band, an eaves band, and a roof of purple Lakeland slate with a stone ridge and copings and moulded kneelers. There is one low storey, and it contains an arcade of six shouldered segmental arches with slabs between them. To the left is a short stretch of low wall continuing an inscribed bronze plaque.	II*
Christ Church; 54.44327°N 0.97637°W		1838	The church was extended in 1875 when the chancel, vestry and organ chamber were added. It is built in sandstone with a Lakeland slate roof, and consists of a west tower, a nave, a porch in the angle of the tower and nave, and a chancel with a north aisle and a south porch-vestry. The tower has two stages, stepped diagonal buttresses, bands, lancet windows, round-arched single-light bell openings, and an embattled parapet with corner pinnacles. On the west front is a fragment of a 12th-century arch above a segmental-headed dated plaque.	II
Westerdale Hall; 54.44528°N 0.97989°W		Before 1874	A hunting lodge, later used for other purposes, in sandstone, with roofs of Lakeland slate and lead, with some crowstepped gables. There is an irregular plan with blocks of between one and five storeys. The windows are mullioned, and some also have transoms. The porch has a Tudor arch with a blank shield above it, and the inner doorway has a Tudor arch. To the left is a screen wall with a Tudor arched doorway and a pavilion with a tented lead roof. At the rear is a stair window, and a massive five-storey embattled tower.	II
