= Florian Esdorf =

German footballer

Personal information
- Date of birth: 21 February 1995 (age 31)
- Place of birth: Rostock, Germany
- Height: 1.90 m (6 ft 3 in)
- Position: Defender

Team information
- Current team: Anker Wismar
- Number: 13

Youth career
- PSV Ribnitz-Damgarten
- FSV Bentwisch
- 2008–2014: Hansa Rostock

Senior career*
Years	Team	Apps	(Gls)
2014–2017	Hansa Rostock II	48	(3)
2016–2017	Hansa Rostock	5	(0)
2016–2017	→ FC Schönberg (loan)	27	(0)
2017–2020	Wacker Nordhausen	70	(8)
2020–2021	Hansa Rostock II	9	(2)
2021–2022	Rostocker FC	17	(1)
2022–	Anker Wismar	51	(10)
- * Club domestic league appearances and goals as of 8 June 2024

Florian Esdorf (born 21 February 1995) is a German footballer who plays as a defender for Anker Wismar.

== Career ==
Born in Rostock, Esdorf started his senior career at Hansa Rostock. He joined FC Schönberg on a half-season loan in August 2016, before the loan was extended until the end of the season. In the summer of 2017, Esdorf joined Regionalliga Nordost side Wacker Nordhausen. After 70 league appearances with Wacker Nordhausen, he returned to Hansa Rostock in 2020, joining Hansa Rostock II.
