= FC Erfurt-Nord =

German sports club

- Founded: 1902; 123 years ago
- Ground: Sportplatz Grubenstraße
- Capacity: 4,000
- Manager: Tobias Eckermann
- League: Landesklasse Thüringen-Nord (VII)
- 2023/24: 3rd
- Website: Website

FC Erfurt-Nord is a German sports club based in Erfurt, Thuringia. The team currently plays in the Landesklasse Thüringen-Nord, the seventh tier of the German football league system in the state.

== History ==
The club was founded in 1902 as Teutonia Erfurt. In 1912, it merged with FC Germania Erfurt to form SpVgg Erfurt. In 1933, SpVgg Erfurt qualified for the newly-founded Gauliga Mitte, at that time the highest league in the state of Thuringia. After the creation of the Soviet occupation zone in Germany, all sports clubs were dissolved but SpVgg Erfurt was re-established in 1946. From 1946 to German reunification in 1989, the club underwent a number of mergers and name changes as it bounced between leagues, experience success at the regional level. Perhaps its greatest success was promotion to the DDR-Liga in 1975 before being relegated again at the end of the 1976/77 season. The club took on its current name of FC Erfurt-Nord on March 12, 2003 when the club voted to separate the football department from the larger sports club.

Recent successes include winning the Landesklasse for the 2019/20 season and earning promotion to the Thüringenliga. In 2025, the club was again in the running for promotion back to the Thüringenliga entering the final matchday of the 2024/25 season.

== Reserve team ==
As of 2025, the club's reserve side, FC Erfurt-Nord II, competes in the Kreisoberliga (VIII).

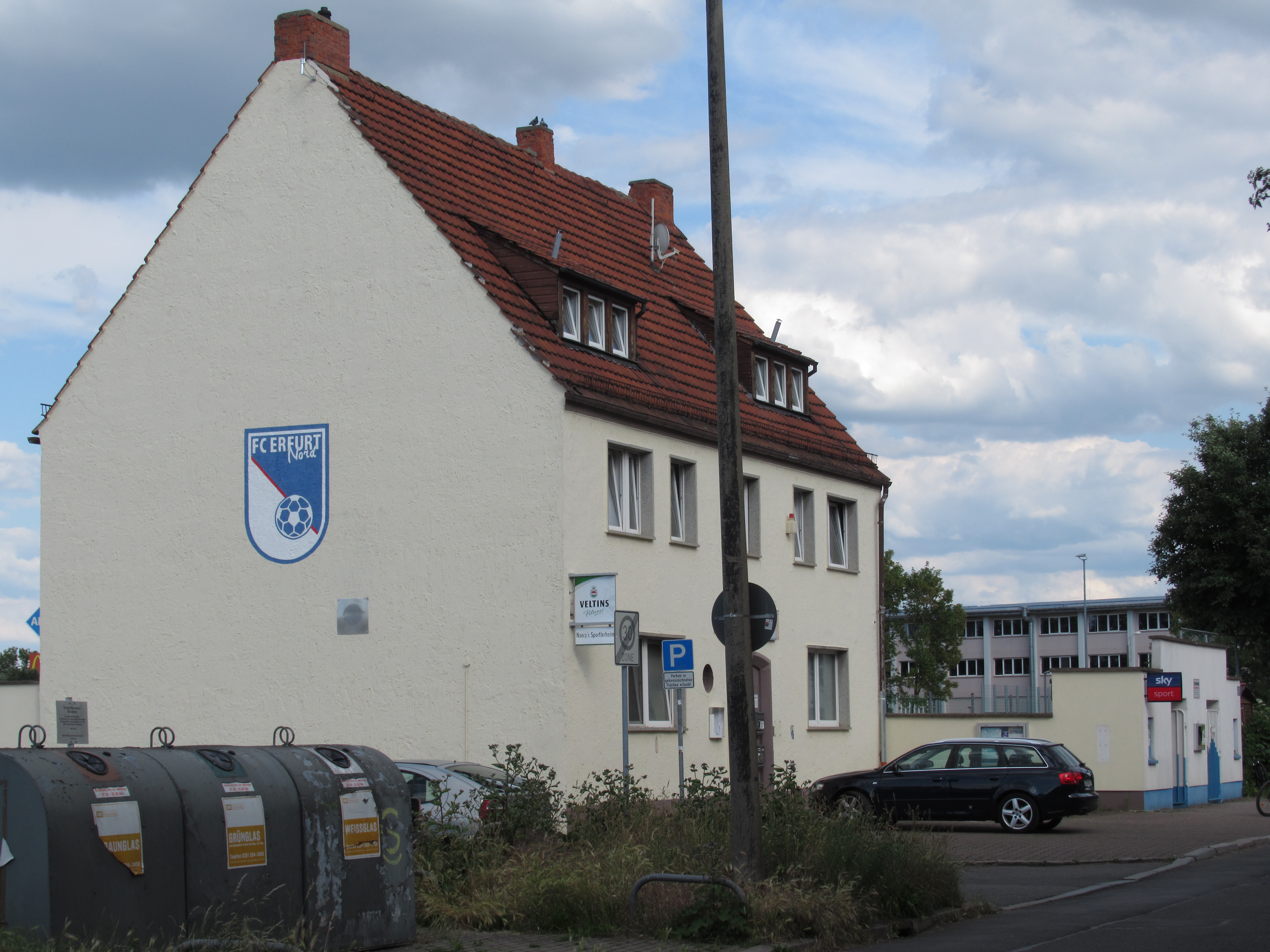
Club building on Grubenstraße

== Honours ==
Competitions	Titles	Seasons
Thüringenliga	1	2002–03

== Notable players ==
- (Montserrat) Seigel Rodney (2025–)
