= Charter bole =

Indentations found in the boundary walls of Scottish buildings

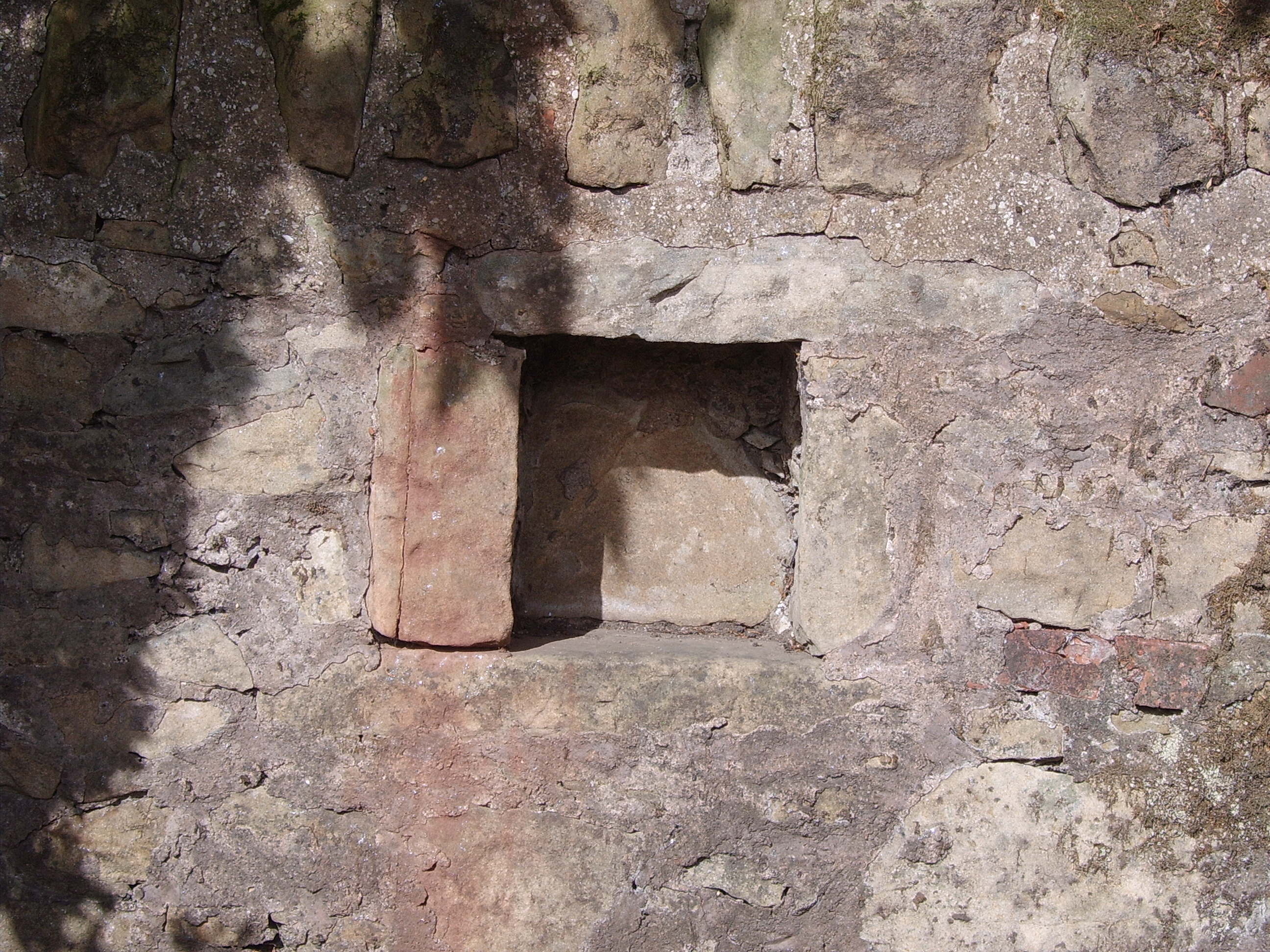
17th century charter bole at Provost Wynd, Cupar, Fife, Scotland

Charter boles are indentations found in the boundary walls of Scottish buildings constructed between the 15th and 17th centuries; they were used to denote ownership and responsibility for repair. They are similar to bee boles but smaller.

"in Scotland a single charter bole, one foot square or less, was often built into a wall to indicate its ownership".

"charter bole: a rectangular recess used to house charter documents defining ownership of adjoining properties."

It shows that the "wall belongs to the property on this side of it".
