= Westerdale =

Village and civil parish in North Yorkshire, England

Coordinates: 54°26′38″N 0°58′34″W

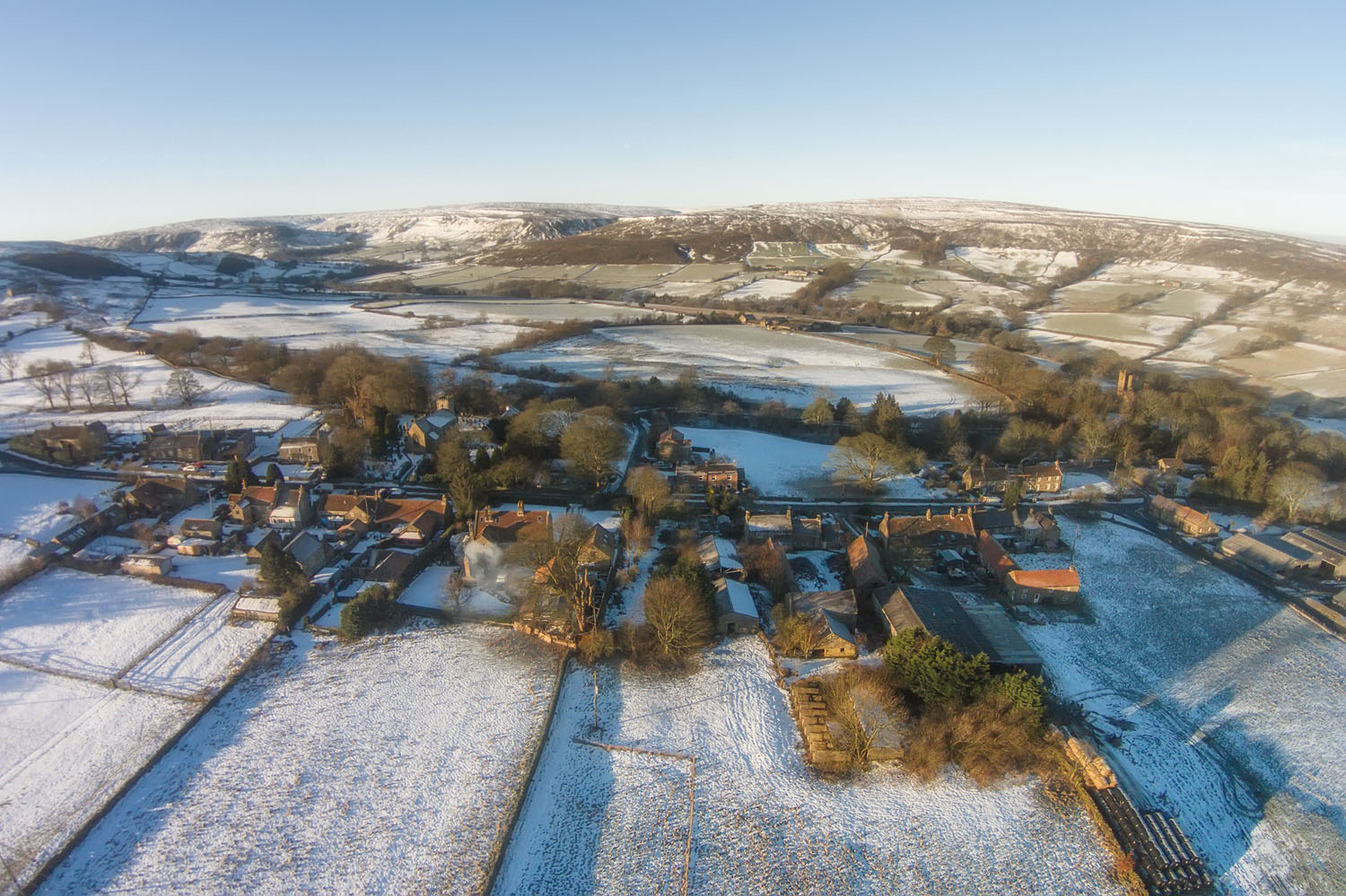
- Aerial view of Westerdale

- Location within North Yorkshire
- Population: 149 (2011 census)
- OS grid reference: NZ665055
- Civil parish: Westerdale
- Unitary authority: North Yorkshire
- Ceremonial county: North Yorkshire
- Region: Yorkshire and the Humber
- Country: England
- Sovereign state: United Kingdom
- Post town: WHITBY
- Postcode district: YO21
- Police: North Yorkshire
- Fire: North Yorkshire
- Ambulance: Yorkshire
- UK Parliament: Scarborough and Whitby

Westerdale is a village, civil parish and valley in North Yorkshire, England. The Esk Valley Walk runs through part of the village. The village is at the confluence of three streams, called "Esklets", which combine as the head of the River Esk.

From 1974 to 2023 it was part of the Borough of Scarborough. It is now administered by the unitary North Yorkshire Council.

According to the 2011 UK census, Westerdale parish had a population of 149, a decrease on the 2001 UK census figure of 175.

== Geography ==
=== The village ===
Westerdale village is a single street of around 25 houses, to the north east of a small stream which joins the Esk near Hunters Sty bridge. There is a church – Christ Church, Westerdale and a small, disused Methodist chapel. Close to the church can be found the Village Hall (formerly a small schoolhouse), a postbox and a telephone box. Ironstone was formerly mined in the village and the church sits on a plateau where the ironstone is just over 1 foot (0.3 m) thick. The village is 10 miles (16 km) south of Guisborough, 10 miles (16 km) south east of Stokesley and 20 miles (32 km) west of Whitby.

=== Westerdale Side ===
Westerdale Side is part of Westerdale, but is best approached from near the neighbouring village of Castleton. It is accessed by a narrow road running along the southwest of Castleton Rigg.

=== Westerdale Moor ===
Westerdale Moor is an extensive upland area surrounding the farmland in Westerdale. At its highest, Westerdale Moor rises to 429 metres in the vicinity of Old Ralph and Young Ralph, and Baysdale Moor to the south-west reaches 433 metres at Stony Ridge – the second highest point of the North York Moors.

Much of the moor is covered by peat and heather and descending into the dale, bilberry and some bracken can be found, with Soft rush and sphagnum in boggy areas. Bracken is no longer widespread on Westerdale Moor, since an eradication programme by a previous landowner. There are some trees by the streams which are tributaries of the Esk – mainly Alder, Mountain Ash, Birch, Oak and Holly. Near Stockdale beck are fragments of ancient woodland on steep slopes and, as in nearby Baysdale, a few junipers can be found. During the 19th century, the moor was the site of several collieries.

==== Failed rocket launch ====
On 15 July 1999, the Moor was the site of a failed rocket launch when two amateur space rocket scientists, Alan Bullock and Jago Packer, hoped to break the British rocket launch height record of 20,000 feet and launch the object into space. At the end of its launch countdown, the top half of the nine-foot rocket, named White Rose, exploded and flames emitted from its base. White Rose, which was powered by fuel the two scientists developed themselves, disintegrated on its launchpad, never leaving the ground. The pair were hoping the venture would help them win a £6,400,000 ($10,000,000) X Prize for being the first amateurs to launch a rocket into space, and formed the White Rose Rocket Society for the occasion. Mere hours after the rocket's explosion, the two scientists announced their plans to rebuild the rocket with a different design and launch it again.

The failed launch and explosion were broadcast live nationally by GMTV, whose roving reporter Richard Mackney was there to report on the intended launch, interviewing Packer and communicating back to Esther McVey and Eamonn Holmes in the studio. McVey hoped the launch would be a "large leap for mankind" whereas Mackney believed it would be superior to science fiction films. Mackney later commented that the disintegration "wasn't even a good explosion", comparing it to "a wet fart". Penny Smith, Warren Nettleford and Harriet Rose believe the failed launch made for better television. The GMTV coverage has been included in clip shows including ITV's TV Nightmares III (1999), hosted by Steve Penk, and Channel 5's When TV Goes Horribly Wrong (2017), narrated by Moira Stuart.

=== The farmed dale ===
Despite its rather remote upland location, Westerdale has been farmed for thousands of years. Soil types vary across the dale (and often in the same field), through strong clays to free-draining shale. Historically some of the more fertile lower fields grew a range of arable crops particularly barley, oats, turnips and potatoes, but more recently most farms concentrate on grass for grazing and the production of hay and silage as winter feed.

There are many miles of dry stone walls in several styles which have been built over a very long timespan dividing and stock-proofing the fields along with various hedges. In recent years much work has been done to safeguard and improve both walls and hedges through a National Park sponsored programme.

=== Westerdale Hall ===
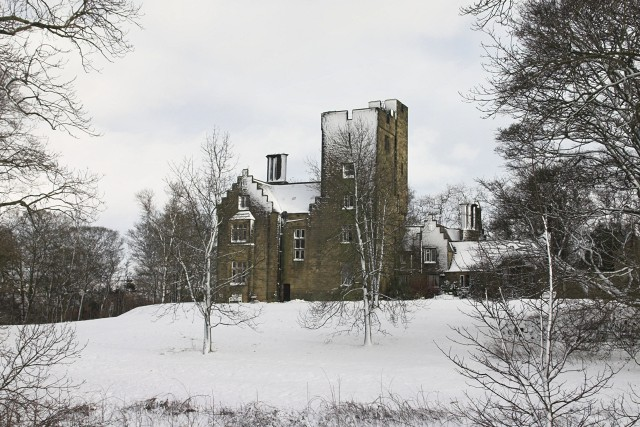
Westerdale Hall

Westerdale Hall is a substantial stone and slate-roofed building, located close to the west side of the village. It was designed by Thomas Henry Wyatt and originally built as a shooting lodge, mainly for grouse shooting in the late summer and autumn. After the Second World War it became a popular youth hostel, but is now a private residence with many of its original external features remaining intact.

=== Hunters Sty Bridge ===
An ancient stone arch over the River Esk near the village. By the road towards Kildale, but the modern road crosses the Esk by a ford nearby. This route would have been well travelled in the past, as the way to Baysdale Abbey and Gisborough Priory. The bridge was restored by the Duncombe family in the late 19th century (a date stone on the downstream side states 1874), but the underside of the arch retains interesting Medieval ribbed stonework.

It is thought the Knights Templar may have been involved in the construction; it is of that period.

=== The Esklets ===
The River Esk rises as numerous small streams in the upper part of Westerdale, known as "The Esklets" – which is close to neighbouring Farndale. Until recently, water was extracted from these streams for public supply but this is no longer the case and the old pumping station stands empty.

== Links with the Knights Templar ==
Agricultural land and a hall, situated in the Westerdale area, were given to the Order of Knights Templar at an early period in the 12th century. The property was donated by Guido de Bovingcourt, who owned the land together with other holdings in nearby Baysdale (a.k.a. Basedale/Handale/ Grendale). Bovingcourt was a supporter of the Cistercians and donated other lands in the area to them including Battersby, Stokesley, Newby, and Baysdale itself.

== See also ==
- Listed buildings in Westerdale
