= Hartpury =

Coordinates: 51.92765°N 2.29743°W

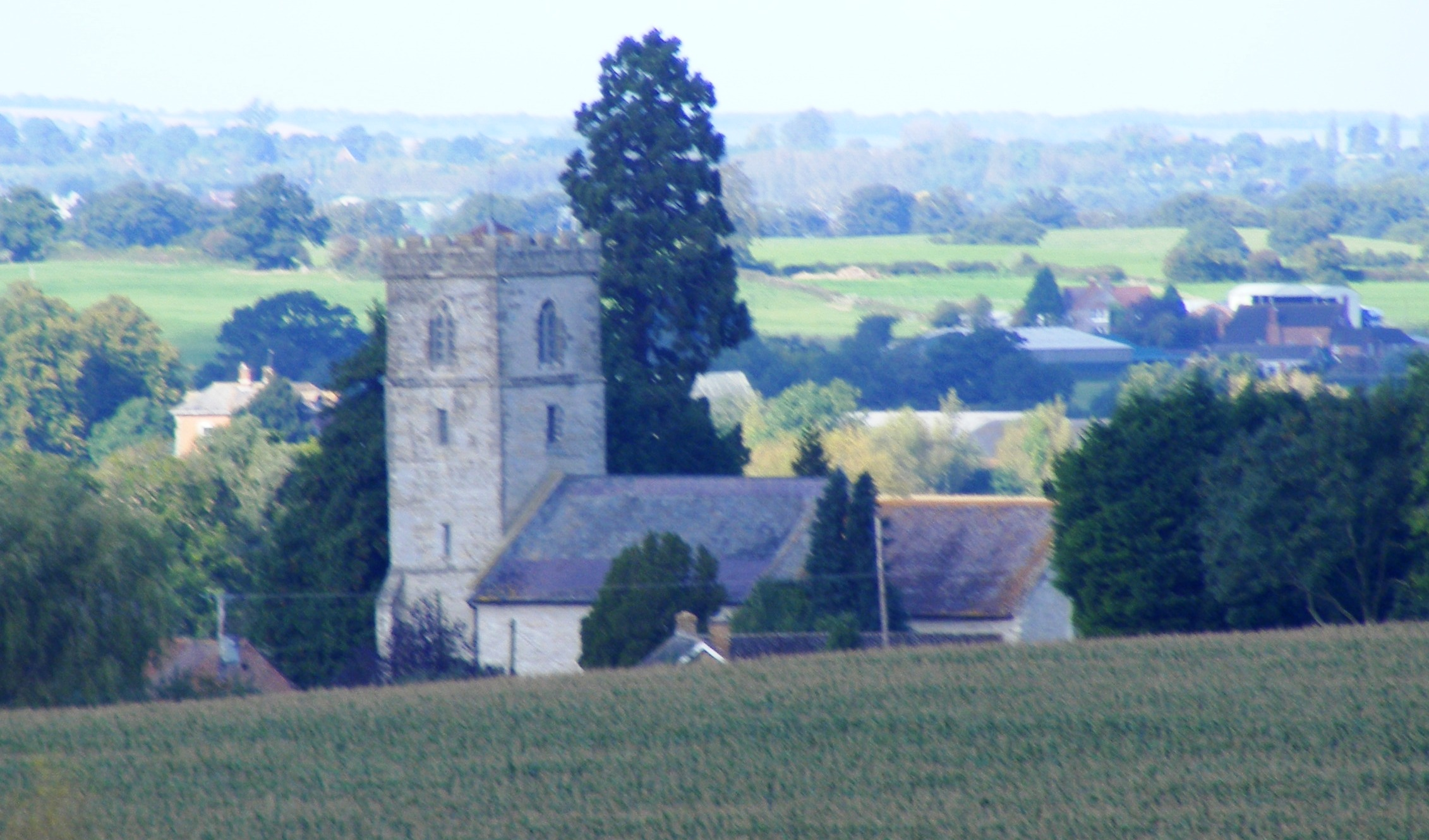
- Hartpury parish church

- Location within Gloucestershire
- Population: 700 (2024)
- OS grid reference: SO799248
- Civil parish: Hartpury
- District: Forest of Dean
- Shire county: Gloucestershire
- Region: South West
- Country: England
- Sovereign state: United Kingdom
- Post town: GLOUCESTER
- Postcode district: GL19
- Dialling code: 01452
- Police: Gloucestershire
- Fire: Gloucestershire
- Ambulance: South Western
- UK Parliament: Forest of Dean

Hartpury is a civil parish in Gloucestershire, England. It has an area of about 3,500 acres (1,400 ha). Hartpury Parish Council estimates 700 people live in around 270 houses. The population of the central village area within the parish was estimated at 550 people by Forest of Dean District Council in July 2024, and new housing allocations of 66 additional houses were anticipated by 2041.

The village is about 5 miles (8 km) north of Gloucester. Geographically the parish is in Leadon Vale; administratively it is in the Forest of Dean. The Hartpury University and Hartpury College campus is based in the village. There is a half-form entry primary school, Hartpury C of E Primary School, and a nursery, Little Oaks.

On the 13th August 2026, Hartpury College recorded a temperature of 38.2 °C, the highest temperature recorded anywhere in the UK that year.

== Governance ==
An electoral ward in the same name exists. This ward runs north to Corse. Six councillors represent the village on the parish council.

== Architecture ==
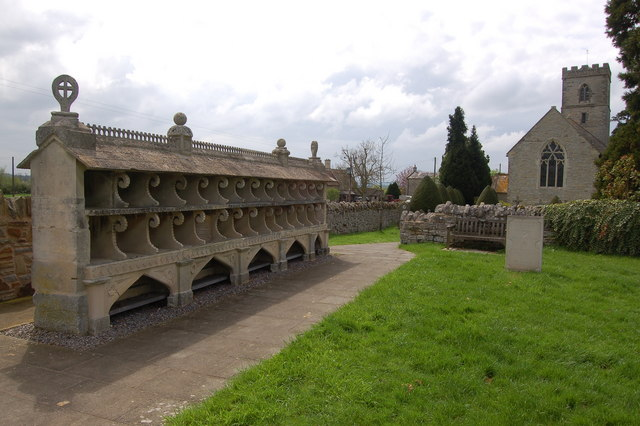
Bee Shelter at St Mary's Church

The village has several interesting buildings including the former home of the Canning family, Hartpury House, now part of the college. Hill House, also known as The Hill, is a large timber-framed house which contains a sixteenth-century oak staircase and several plaster ceilings of the same period. The village hall was built in 2013 and won a design award from the Campaign to Protect Rural England (CPRE). There is a bee shelter in the churchyard.

Built development in Hartpury mainly fronts the A417 highway and the roads that join it with some more recent consolidation around small newer schemes. Hartpury has experienced steady growth, with the majority of the housing being post 1950s, comprising mainly detached two-storey red brick dwellings. There remain some older cottages dotted around the settlement and the village is adjoined by fields, orchards and open areas.

== Notable people ==
The First World War poet F. W. Harvey was born at Marlsend, Murrell's End, Hartpury on 26 March 1888. His father was Howard Frederick Harvey, a farmer and horse dealer.

Three time National Hunt champion jockey Terry Biddlecombe was born at Hartpury Court in 1941.
