= Basedale Priory =

Priory in North Yorkshire, England

Coordinates: 54.451848°N 1.044482°W

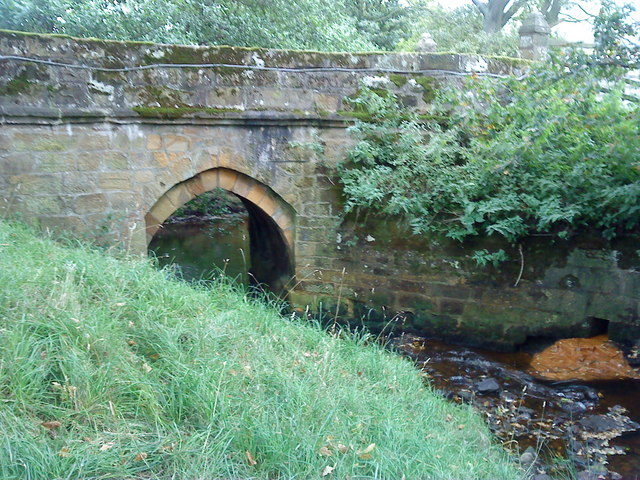
Baysdale Abbey Bridge, said to be the only visible remains of the nunnery

Basedale Priory or Baysdale Priory was a priory in Baysdale, North Yorkshire, England located 8 miles (13 km) east of the parish church of Stokesley. It was established in 1163 as a house of Cistercian nuns who had moved there from Nunthorpe and was suppressed in 1539.

== Baysdale Abbey Bridge ==
The sole remnant of the priory is a bridge, believed to date from the 13th century. The parapets were rebuilt in the 17th or 18th century. The bridge carries a road over Black Beck, and is built of stone. It consists of a single arch with a strengthening arch below and an internal plinth. There is a moulded band under the parapet, which dates probably from the 17th century. The bridge has a roughly serpentine plan, ending in piers with square domed caps on swept bases. The road surface and kerbs are modern. It is a scheduled monument and a grade II* listed building.

== Baysdale Abbey ==
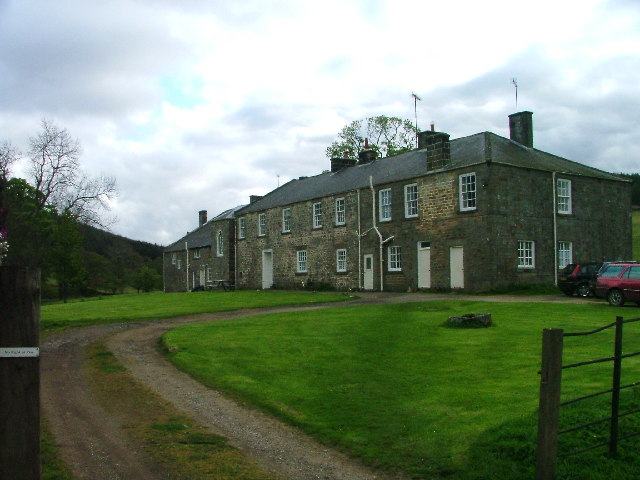
17th and 19th century buildings on the site of the former nunnery

The large farmhouse known as Baysdale Abbey lies on the site of the priory. It was built in 1633 and largely rebuilt in 1822. It has more recently been used as a shooting lodge and then as holiday lets. It is built of stone and has a Welsh slate roof with a stone ridge and coping. It has two storeys and a total of 14 bays. The main section has five bays, to the right are three more bays, to the left is a projecting stair bay, and further to the left are two older bays. On the second bay of the main section is a doorway with a panelled reveal, an architrave and a radial fanlight, above which are two initialled datestones. Most of the windows are sashes, some horizontally sliding, and the stair bay has a pointed-arched window. At the extreme left is a bay with a porch containing a doorway with a gabled hood and Tudor arched windows. It has been grade II listed since 1990.

== See also ==
- Grade II* listed buildings in North Yorkshire (district)
- Listed buildings in Westerdale
