= Matthias Peßolat =

German footballer

Personal information
- Date of birth: 26 March 1985 (age 41)
- Place of birth: Cottbus, East Germany
- Height: 1.88 m (6 ft 2 in)
- Position: Defensive midfielder

Team information
- Current team: Wacker Nordhausen
- Number: 16

Youth career
- Glückauf Brieske-Senftenberg
- –2004: Energie Cottbus

Senior career*
Years	Team	Apps	(Gls)
2004–2006	Energie Cottbus II		
2004–2005	→ FV Dresden 06 (loan)		
2006–2010	Rot-Weiß Erfurt	76	(1)
2010–2012	Chemnitzer FC	69	(7)
2012–2014	Carl Zeiss Jena	53	(15)
2014–2018	Wacker Nordhausen	111	(9)
Total		309	(32)
- * Club domestic league appearances and goals as of 09:55, 24 October 2018 (UTC)

Matthias Peßolat (born 26 March 1985) is a German former footballer who played as a defensive midfielder.
