= Old Ralph and Young Ralph =

Monuments in North Yorkshire, England

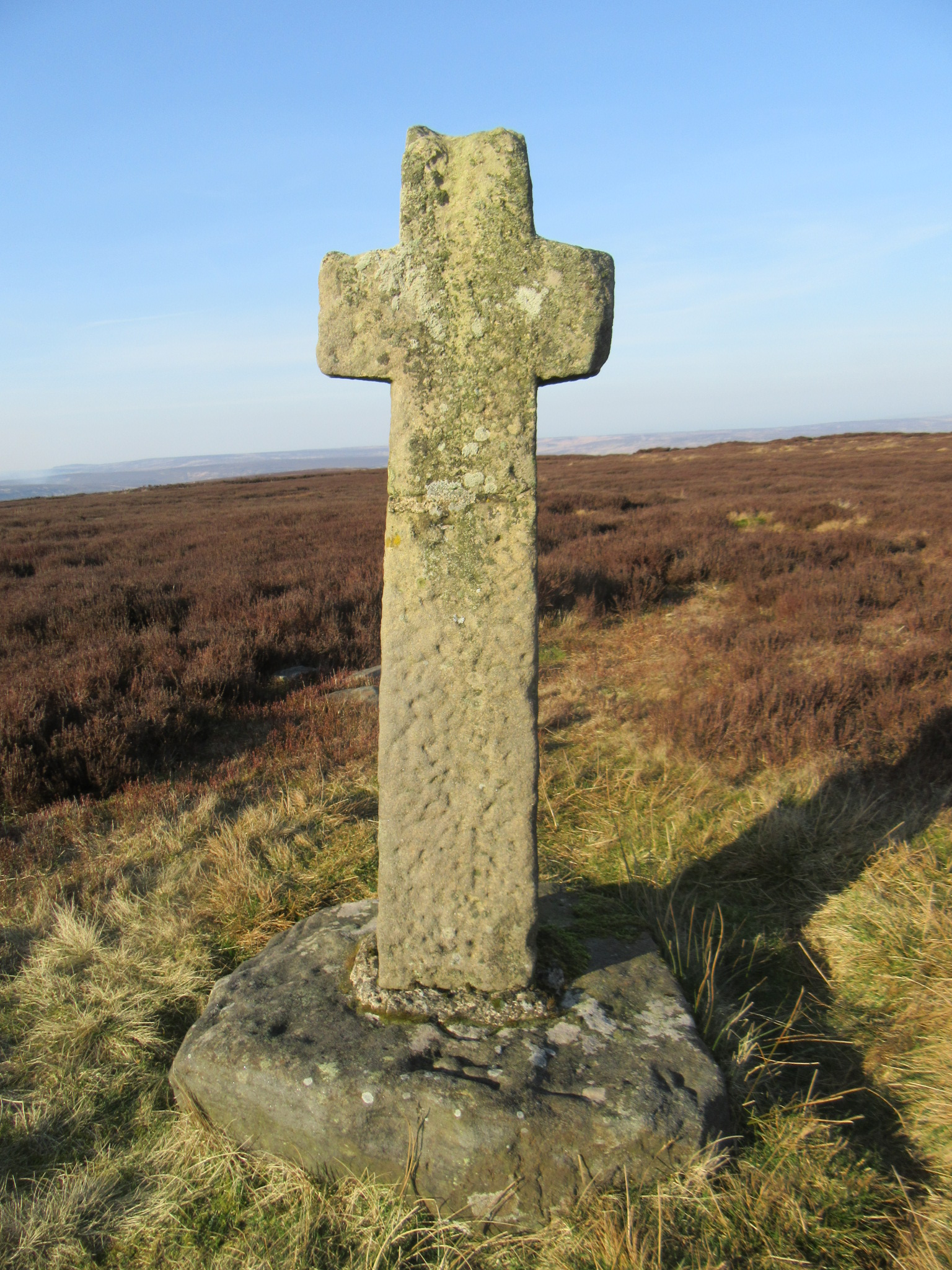
- Old Ralph in 2022

General information
- Location: Rosedale Head, North York Moors, England
- Year built: 11th century (possible)

Listed Building – Grade II*
- Official name: Old Ralph Cross
- Designated: 20 December 1990
- Reference no.: 1179098

Scheduled monument
- Official name: Wayside cross known as Old Ralph on Ledging Hill, Westerdale Moor
- Designated: 2 December 1938
- Reference no.: 1012894

Listed Building – Grade II*
- Official name: Young Ralph Cross
- Designated: 9 October 1969
- Reference no.: 1148563

Scheduled monument
- Official name: Wayside cross and boundary marker known as Young Ralph on Westerdale Moor
- Designated: 2 December 1938
- Reference no.: 1012891

Old Ralph and Young Ralph are two nearby historic monuments at Rosedale Head on the North York Moors, England.

== Old Ralph ==
Old Ralph stands near the top of Ledging Hill, out of sight of the nearby road (54°24′32″N 0°57′46″W). It was probably carved in the 11th century; it was first recorded in a charter dating from around 1200. It is Grade II* listed and is also a scheduled monument. A local legend claims it was erected by a local farmer, named Ralph, in memory of a traveller who died at the location.

The wayside cross is carved of gritstone, and is about 6 feet (1.8 m) in height. It is set in a socket hole in a roughly-shaped base, and is a monolith cross with weathered interlace decoration. The letter "R", standing for "Ralph", was later carved into it, and in 1708 the date and initials "CD" for "Charles Duncan" were also carved into it. It later broke just under a metre from the base, and was repaired with a pin and mortar.

== Young Ralph ==
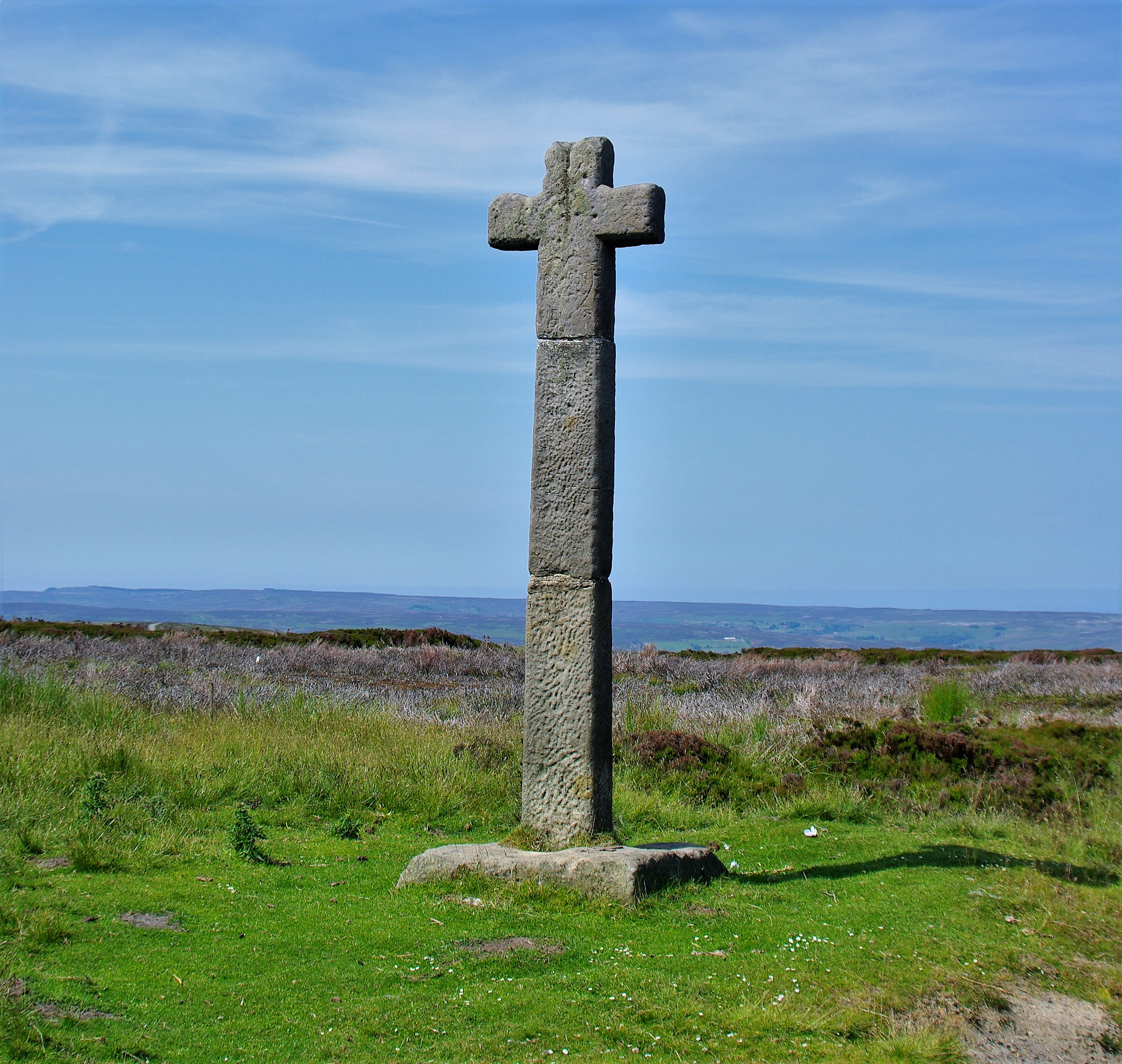
Young Ralph in 2013

Young Ralph sits lower down Ledging Hill, by the road up Rosedale (54°24′35″N 0°57′29″W). It originally marked the boundary of the Pickering Lythe wapentake. It was probably also carved in the 11th century. The head of the cross was replaced, perhaps in the 18th century. The cross was broken in 1984 and again in 1990, and on both occasions was repaired with steel pins and cement. Like Old Ralph, it is Grade II* listed and a scheduled monument. In 1974, it was adopted as the emblem of the North York Moors National Park.

The wayside cross is carved of gritstone, and is about 10 feet (3.0 m) in height. It has a roughly-shaped base, and the lower part has much-weathered interlace ornament and a cable-moulded border. The shaft has slightly chamfered corners and is not tapered. Stone dressing marks show it was shaped by a pick and not by a chisel.

== See also ==
- Grade II* listed buildings in North Yorkshire (district)
- Listed buildings in Westerdale
