= FSV Wacker 90 Nordhausen =

German association football club from Nordhausen, Thuringia

- Full name: FSV Wacker 90 Nordhausen
- Nickname: Wacker
- Founded: 1905 (as Wacker 05 Nordhausen); 1990 (as FSV Wacker 90 Nordhausen)
- Ground: Albert-Kuntz-Sportpark
- Capacity: 8,000
- Chairman: Detlef Zeitler
- Manager: Jörg Goslar
- League: Verbandsliga Thüringen (VI)
- 2024–25: Verbandsliga Thüringen, 9th of 16
Home colours	Away colours	Third colours

FSV Wacker 90 Nordhausen is a German association football club from Nordhausen, Thuringia.

The club's greatest success has been promotion to the Regionalliga Nordost in 1995 and 2013. It has also won the Thuringia Cup on four occasions and, through this, qualified for the first round of the DFB-Pokal, the German Cup.

== History ==
Logo of predecessor side SV Wacker 05 Nordhausen

The football team FC Wacker 05 Nordhausen was founded on 1 November 1905 as an offshoot of a Protestant youth club in the city. By 14 June 1906 the team had broadened its scope to become the sports club SV Wacker 05 Nordhausen and in 1908 merged with local side Ballsport-Club Mars Nordhausen which had been formed in 1906. Until 1918 the club played as SV Wacker-Mars Nordhausen when it was renamed 1. SV Wacker 05 Nordhausen. Playing in the VMBV (Verband Mitteldeutscher Ballspiel Vereine or Federation of Middle German Ball Playing Teams), Wacker participated in the early rounds of the league championships in the mid- to late 20s, but without any success.

After the end of World War II occupying Allied authorities ordered the dissolution of all organizations in Germany, including sports and football clubs. The former membership of Wacker reorganized as SG Nordhausen in 1946 and this team went on to become the football department of the sports club BSG Motor Nordhausen in 1949. The club played briefly as KWU/Lok Nordhausen after a merger with an industrial club. From 1951 on the team played as BSG Motor Nordhausen-West in second tier East German football. Motor enjoyed some modest success in the early 80s but then slipped and was relegated to the third division Bezirkliga Erfurt in 1989.

After German reunification in 1990 the football department separated from the sports club to form FSV Wacker 90. The newly independent team took up play in the NOFV-Oberliga Süd (III) in the 1991–92 season and played at that level for seven years, interrupted by three seasons in the Regionalliga Nordost (III) from 1995 to 1998. During the 1990s the club made three appearances in the DFB-Pokal, in 1992–93, 1996–97 and 1997–98 but was knocked out in the first round at each occasion. After relegation back to the NOFV-Oberliga Süd (IV) in 1998 the club slowly declined. Financial problems drove the club further down to the Landesliga Thüringen (V) in 2000–01 before they finally landed in the Landesklasse Thuringen-Ost (VI) in 2002.

After a decade of lower league play the club won the Thüringenliga in 2011–12 and the NOFV-Oberliga Süd the season after to make a return to the Regionalliga Nordost where it plays today.

== Stadium ==
FSV plays its home matches in the Albert-Kuntz-Sportpark which has a capacity of 8,000 (~1,000 seats) spectators.

== Current squad ==
As of 13 February 2018

Note: Flags indicate national team as defined under FIFA eligibility rules; some limited exceptions apply. Players may hold more than one non-FIFA nationality.

No.	Pos.	Nation	Player
1	GK	GER	Tino Berbig
2	DF	GER	Kevin Schulze
3	DF	GER	Florian Esdorf
4	DF	GER	Mounir Chaftar
5	DF	GER	Jerome Propheter
6	DF	GER	Tobias Becker (Captain)
7	MF	GER	Benjamin Kauffmann
8	FW	BIH	Dino Medjedovic
9	FW	MTQ	Bédi Buval
10	FW	KOS	Ilir Azemi
11	FW	GER	Joy-Lance Mickels
13	FW	GER	Oliver Genausch

No.	Pos.	Nation	Player
14	MF	GER	Lucas Scholl
15	MF	AZE	Bilel Sezer
16	MF	GER	Matthias Peßolat
17	DF	GER	Tim Häußler
18	FW	GER	Nils Pichinot
22	GK	GER	Ruben Aulig
26	DF	SVK	Vladimír Kováč
29	DF	GER	Robin Fluß
33	DF	CRO	Petar Lela
61	MF	TUR	Cihan Uçar
77	MF	GER	Daniel Hägler

== Honors ==
The club's honours:

- NOFV-Oberliga Süd
  - Champions: 1995, 2013
- Thüringenliga
  - Champions: 2012, 2015^{‡}
- Landesklasse Thüringen-Ost
  - Champions: 2005
- Thuringia Cup
  - Winners: 1992, 1996, 1997, 2019
  - Runners-up: 1998, 1999, 2017, 2023
- ^{‡} Denotes won by reserve team.

== Recent seasons ==
The recent season-by-season performance of the club:

Year	Division	Tier	Position
1999–2000	NOFV-Oberliga Süd	IV	7th
2000–01	NOFV-Oberliga Süd	IV	18th ↓
2001–02	Landesliga Thüringen	V	15th↓
2002–03	Landesklasse Thüringen-West	VI	3rd
2003–04	Landesklasse Thüringen-Ost	VI	5th
2004–05	Landesklasse Thüringen-Ost	VI	1st ↑
2005–06	Thüringenliga	V	4th
2006–07	Thüringenliga	V	7th
2007–08	Thüringenliga	V	8th
2008–09	Thüringenliga	VI	3rd
2009–10	Thüringenliga	VI	3rd
2010–11	Thüringenliga	VI	9th
2011–12	Thüringenliga	VI	1st ↑
2012–13	NOFV-Oberliga Süd	V	1st ↑
2013–14	Regionalliga Nordost	IV	5th
2014–15	Regionalliga Nordost	IV	3rd
2015–16	Regionalliga Nordost	IV	3rd
2016–17	Regionalliga Nordost	IV	7th
2017–18	Regionalliga Nordost	IV	2nd
2018–19	Regionalliga Nordost	IV	3rd
2019–20	Regionalliga Nordost	IV	13th↓

- With the introduction of the Regionalligas in 1994 and the 3. Liga in 2008 as the new third tier, below the 2. Bundesliga, all leagues below dropped one tier.

↑ Promoted	↓ Relegated
