= Christ Church, Westerdale =

Church in Westerdale, North Yorkshire, England

Coordinates: 54.4432°N 0.9763°W

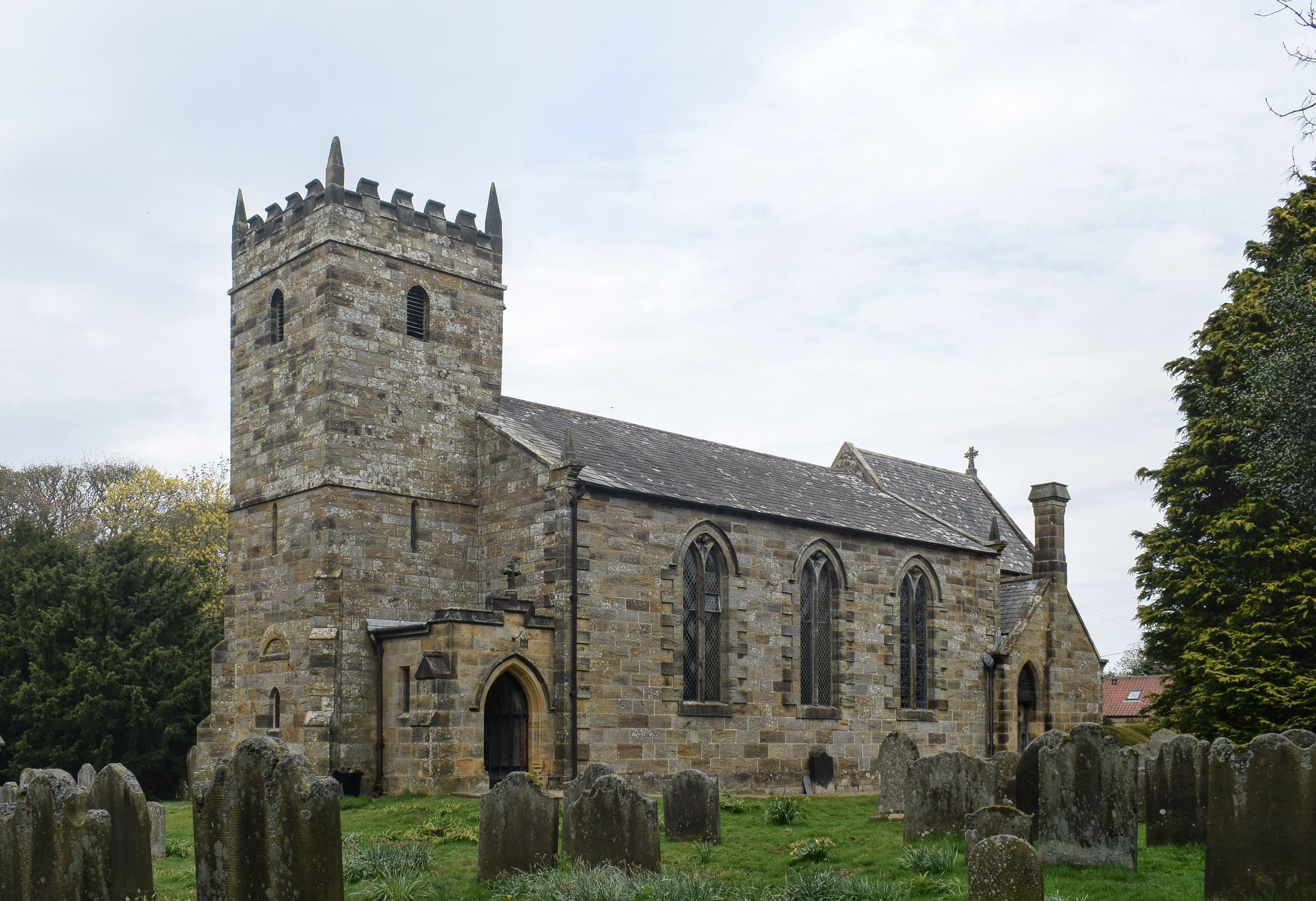
The church in 2026

Christ Church is the parish church of Westerdale, a village in North Yorkshire, in England.

A church existed in Westerdale in the Mediaeval period, perhaps having been built in the Norman era. It was entirely rebuilt in 1838, perhaps incorporating some of the old stone. In 1875, a chancel, vestry and organ chamber were added to a design by William Falkenbridge, and the interior was restored. A porch was added in 1896, when the building was again restored, and the chancel was further renovated in 1911. The building was grade II listed in 1969.

It is built in sandstone with a Lakeland slate roof, and consists of a west tower, a nave, a porch in the angle of the tower and nave, and a chancel with a north aisle and a south porch-vestry. The tower has two stages, stepped diagonal buttresses, bands, lancet windows, round-arched single-light bell openings, and an embattled parapet with corner pinnacles. On the west front is a fragment of a 12th-century arch above a segmental-headed dated plaque. Inside, there are three Mediaeval grave covers and some fragments of a cross.

== See also ==
- Listed buildings in Westerdale
