= Jonas Zickert =

German footballer

Personal information
- Date of birth: 25 August 1997 (age 29)
- Place of birth: Cottbus, Germany
- Height: 1.82 m (6 ft 0 in)
- Position: Midfielder

Youth career
- 2004–2010: SG Groß Gaglow
- 2010–2016: Energie Cottbus

Senior career*
| Years | Team | Apps | (Gls) |
| 2015–2020 | Energie Cottbus | 45 | (3) |
| 2015–2016 | Energie Cottbus II | 5 | (1) |
| 2020–2021 | BFC Dynamo | 10 | (0) |
| 2021–2023 | VfB Krieschow | 33 | (1) |
- * Club domestic league appearances and goals

Jonas Zickert (born 25 August 1997) is a retired German footballer who played as a midfielder.
