= Thüringenliga =

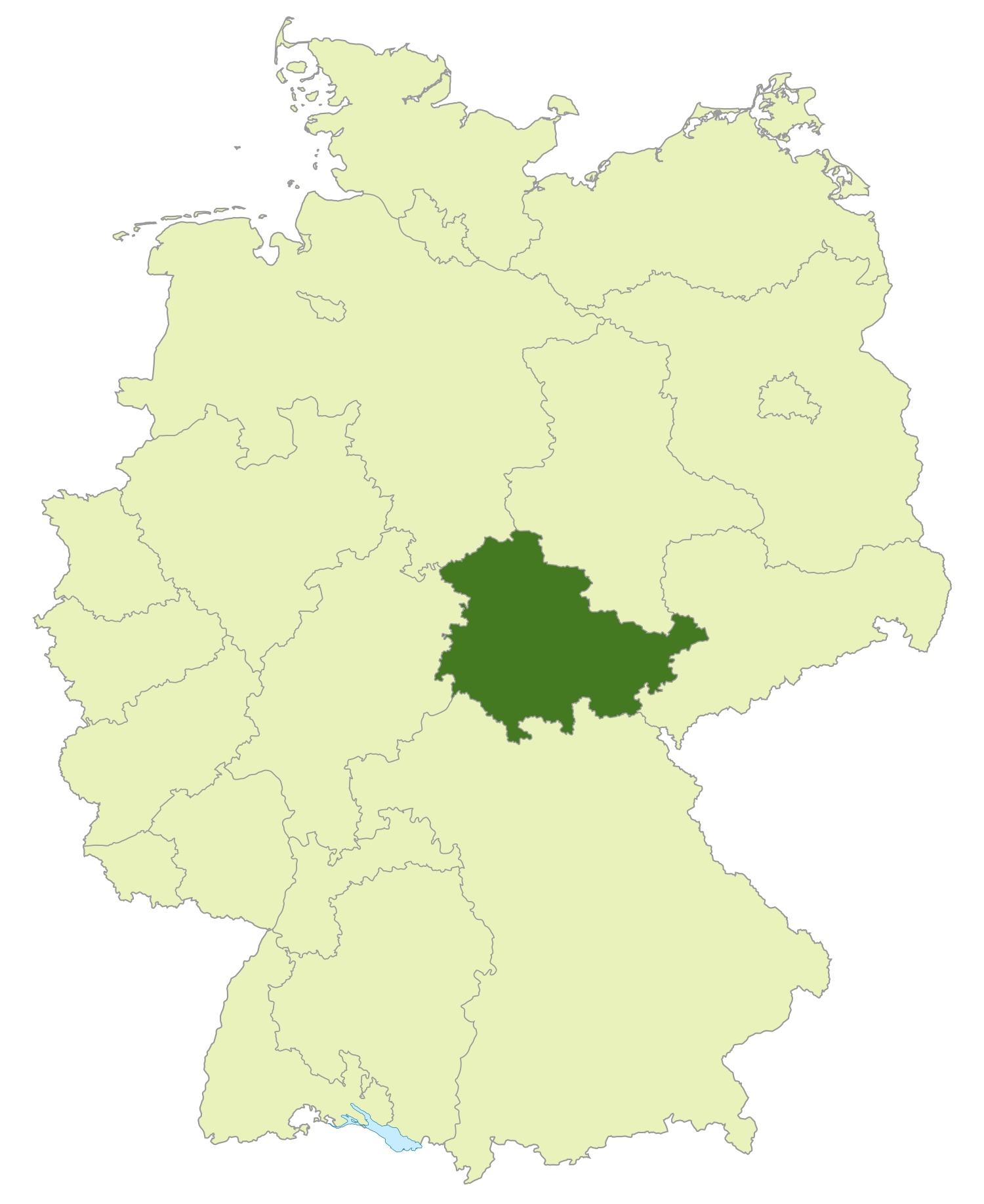
- Founded: 1990
- Country: Germany
- State: Thuringia
- Number of clubs: 16
- Level on pyramid: Level 6
- Promotion to: NOFV-Oberliga Süd
- Relegation to: Landesklasse Thüringen-Nord; Landesklasse Thüringen-Süd; Landesklasse Thüringen-Ost
- Domestic cup(s): Thuringia Cup
- Current champions: FC Thüringen Weida (2021–22)

The Thüringenliga is the sixth tier (VI) of the German football league system and the highest league in the German state of Thuringia (German: Thüringen). Until the introduction of the 3. Liga in 2008 it was the fifth tier of the league system, until the introduction of the Regionalligas in 1994 the fourth tier.

== Overview ==
The Thüringenliga was established in 1990 as the Landesliga Thüringen from fourteen clubs as a highest league for the German state of Thuringia, which was established after the league in October 1990, and the Thuringia Football Association, TFV (German: Thüringer Fußball-Verband). It comprised the area of the three Bezirksligen of Erfurt, Gera and Suhl. Each of those three leagues contributed a number of clubs to the new league while one club was relegated from the DDR-Liga, then the second division. The Thüringenliga was established within the East German football league system and incorporated in the league system of the united Germany at the end of its first season, in 1991.

The league has been a feeder league, together with the Sachsenliga and Verbandsliga Sachsen-Anhalt, to the NOFV-Oberliga Süd, which its champion is directly promoted to. As such, it was the fourth tier of the German league system.

After having fourteen clubs in the league in its first season, the number went to seventeen the year after and was then set at sixteen, which it maintained for most seasons. It some years the number does however vary to balance out promotion and relegation.

In 1994, with the establishment of the Regionalliga Nordost as the new third tier of the league system, the Thüringenliga fell to tier five in the system but remained unchanged otherwise.

In 2008, the league was again demoted one level when the 3. Liga was established. However, this changed nothing in the leagues status as a feeder league to the NOFV-Oberliga.

The Landesligen of Thuringia and Saxony are unique in their naming as every other league in Germany of this standing carries the name Verbandsliga. This was done so simply by choice of the local football associations (German:Fußballverband) in Saxony and Thuringia and the name could be changed to Verbandsliga if they wish to do so.

== League champions ==
The league champions:

Season	Champions
1990–91	FV Zeulenroda
1991–92	SV Funkwerk Kölleda
1992–93	1. Suhler SV
1993–94	FC Carl Zeiss Jena II
1994–95	SC Weimar
1995–96	SV Kahla
1996–97	SV Schott Jena
1997–98	SSV Erfurt-Nord
1998–99	1. SV Gera
1999–00	Eintracht Sondershausen
2000–01	FSV Wacker 03 Gotha
2001–02	VfB Pößneck
2002–03	FC Erfurt-Nord
2003–04	ZFC Meuselwitz
2004–05	Rot-Weiß Erfurt II
2005–06	FC Carl Zeiss Jena II
2006–07	1. FC Gera 03
2007–08	Rot-Weiß Erfurt II
2008–09	SV Schott Jena
2009–10	BSV Eintracht Sondershausen
2010–11	1. FC Gera 03
2011-12	Wacker Nordhausen
2012-13	SV Schott Jena
2013–14	FC Eisenach
2014–15	Wacker Nordhausen II ^{‡}
2015–16	FC Blau-Weiß Dachwig/Döllstädt ^{‡}
2016–17	Wacker Nordhausen II ^{‡}
2017–18	Wacker Nordhausen II
2018–19	FSV Martinroda
2019–20	FC An der Fahner Höhe
2020–21	None; season annulled
2021–22	FC Thüringen Weida ^{‡}
2022–23	SV 09 Arnstadt
2023–24	FC An der Fahner Höhe ^{‡}
2024–25	1. SC 1911 Heiligenstadt

- ^{‡} Denotes club declined or ineligible for promotion.

== Founding members of the league ==
The league was established from fourteen clubs from four leagues in 1990. Most of the East German clubs changed their names in the years after the reunion, some reverting to their old ones after a brief period. Current names, when different, are listed alongside the name in 1990. The clubs are:

From the 2nd Division-Group B:

- FC Union Mühlhausen

From the Bezirksliga Erfurt:

- SV Funkwerk Kölleda, now FSV 06 Kölleda
- Glückauf Sondershausen, now BSV Eintracht Sondershausen
- SC Leinefelde
- Grün-Weiß Erfurt
- Preußen Bad Langensalza
- SV Motor Gotha, now FSV Wacker 03 Gotha

From the Bezirksliga Gera:

- FV Zeulenroda, now FC Motor Zeulenroda again
- Blau-Weiß Gera, later FV Gera Süd, now BSG Wismut Gera again
- SV Jenaer Glaswerk, now SV Schott Jena

From the Bezirksliga Suhl:

- SV EK Veilsdorf
- SV 04 Schmalkalden, now FSV Schmalkalden
- Lok Meiningen, now VfL 04 Meiningen
- Versco Walldorf, now SV Walldorf
