= 2019–20 MSV Duisburg season =

MSV Duisburg
2019–20 season
- Manager: Torsten Lieberknecht
- 3. Liga: 5th
- DFB-Pokal: Second round
- Lower Rhine Cup: Second round
- Top goalscorer: League: Moritz Stoppelkamp (15); All: Moritz Stoppelkamp (19)
- Highest home attendance: 15,505 (vs Münster, 31 July 2019) (vs 1860 Munich, 21 September 2019)
- Lowest home attendance: 11,663 (vs Zwickau, 17 August 2019)
- Average home league attendance: 9,425 (Note: The last eleven matchdays were played behind closed doors.)
- Biggest win: Duisburg 4–1 Großaspach; Braunschweig 0–3 Duisburg; Münster 1–4 Duisburg
- Biggest defeat: Duisburg 1–3 Meppen; Chemnitz 3–1 Duisburg
Home colours	Away colours	Third colours

The 2019–20 MSV Duisburg season was the 120th season in the club's football history. In 2019–20 the club played in the 3. Liga, the third tier of German football.

Due to the COVID-19 pandemic in Germany, the matchdays 28 and 29 were postponed and would be rescheduled. On 16 March, the DFB announced that the league would be suspended until 30 April. On 21 May, the DFB announced that the season would be continued on 30 May.

== Team ==
Note: Flags indicate national team as defined under FIFA eligibility rules; some limited exceptions apply. Players may hold more than one non-FIFA nationality.

No.	Pos.	Nation	Player
1	GK	GER	Leo Weinkauf (on loan from Hannover 96)
4	MF	ROU	Darius Ghindovean
5	DF	GER	Marvin Compper
6	MF	GER	Connor Krempicki
7	MF	GER	Lukas Scepanik
8	DF	GER	Migel Schmeling
9	MF	GER	Ahmet Engin
10	MF	GER	Moritz Stoppelkamp (Captain)
11	MF	GER	Arnold Budimbu
13	MF	GER	Lukas Daschner
14	MF	GER	Tim Albutat
15	DF	GER	Matthias Rahn
17	DF	GER	Arne Sicker

No.	Pos.	Nation	Player
19	FW	GER	Sinan Karweina
20	FW	GER	Leroy-Jacques Mickels
21	MF	GER	Maximilian Jansen
22	GK	GER	Jonas Brendieck
23	DF	GER	Joshua Bitter
24	FW	NED	Vincent Vermeij
25	FW	CRO	Petar Slišković
26	DF	GER	Vincent Gembalies
28	MF	FRA	Yassin Ben Balla
30	GK	SUI	Steven Deana
33	DF	GER	Lukas Boeder
35	FW	GER	Cem Sabanci

== Transfers ==
=== In ===
No.	Pos.	Nat.	Name	Age	EU	Moving from	Type	Transfer window	Ends	Transfer fee	Source
1	GK	(Germany)	Leo Weinkauf	22	EU	Hannover 96	Loan	Summer	2021	Free	MSV Duisburg
2	DF	(Germany)	Florian Brügmann	28	EU	Carl Zeiss Jena	Signing	Summer	2021	Free	MSV Duisburg
5	DF	(Germany)	Marvin Compper	35	EU	(Scotland) Celtic	Signing	Summer	2021	Free	MSV Duisburg
6	MF	(Germany)	Connor Krempicki	24	EU	KFC Uerdingen	Signing	Summer	2020	Free	MSV Duisburg
7	MF	(Germany)	Lukas Scepanik	25	EU	Rot-Weiss Essen	Signing	Summer	2021	Free	MSV Duisburg
11	MF	(Germany)	Arnold Budimbu	24	EU	TSV Steinbach	Signing	Summer	2021	Free	MSV Duisburg
17	DF	(Germany)	Arne Sicker	22	EU	Holstein Kiel	Signing	Summer	2022	Free	MSV Duisburg
18	DF	(Germany)	Thomas Blomeyer	23	EU	Sportfreunde Lotte	End of loan	Summer	2020	Free	
19	FW	(Germany)	Sinan Karweina	20	EU	Sportfreunde Lotte	Signing	Summer	2021	Free	MSV Duisburg
20	FW	(Germany)	Leroy-Jacques Mickels	23	EU	SSVg Velbert	Signing	Summer	2020	Free	MSV Duisburg
21	MF	(Germany)	Maximilian Jansen	26	EU	(Belgium) R.E. Virton	Signing	Summer	2021	Free	MSV Duisburg
23	DF	(Germany)	Joshua Bitter	22	EU	Werder Bremen II	Signing	Summer	2021	Free	MSV Duisburg
24	FW	(Germany)	Vincent Vermeij	22	EU	(Netherlands) Heracles Almelo	Signing	Summer	2021	Free	MSV Duisburg
25	FW	(Croatia)	Petar Slišković	28	EU	VfR Aalen	Signing	Summer	2021	Free	MSV Duisburg
28	MF	(France)	Yassin Ben Balla	23	EU	Rot-Weiß Oberhausen	Loan	Summer	2020	Free	MSV Duisburg
30	GK	(Switzerland)	Steven Deana	29	EU	(Switzerland) FC Aarau	Transfer	Summer	2021	Free	MSV Duisburg
33	DF	(Germany)	Lukas Boeder	24	EU	SC Paderborn	Signing	Summer	2021	Free	MSV Duisburg
15	DF	(Germany)	Matthias Rahn	29	EU	Sportfreunde Lotte	Signing	Winter	2020	Free	MSV Duisburg

=== Out ===
No.	Pos.	Nat.	Name	Age	EU	Moving to	Type	Transfer window	Transfer fee	Source
2	DF	(South Korea)	Seo Young-jae	24	Non-EU	Holstein Kiel	End of contract	Summer	Free	Holstein Kiel
3	DF	(Tunisia)	Enis Hajri	36	Non-EU		End of contract	Summer	Free	MSV Duisburg
5	DF	(Sweden)	Joseph Baffo	26	EU	(Sweden) Halmstads BK	End of contract	Summer	Free	
6	DF	(Germany)	Gerrit Nauber	27	EU	SV Sandhausen	End of contract	Summer	Free	SV Sandhausen
7	DF	(Germany)	Andreas Wiegel	27	EU	(Belgium) Waasland-Beveren	End of contract	Summer	Free	Waasland-Beveren
10	MF	(Germany)	Fabian Schnellhardt	25	EU	SV Darmstadt	Transfer	Summer	Undisclosed	SV Darmstadt
11	FW	(Germany)	Stanislav Iljutcenko	28	EU	(South Korea) Pohang Steelers	End of contract	Summer	Free	Reviersport
15	FW	(Netherlands)	John Verhoek	30	EU	Hansa Rostock	End of contract	Summer	Free	Hansa Rostock
16	MF	(Germany)	Lukas Fröde	24	EU	Karlsruher SC	End of contract	Summer	Free	Karlsruher SC
17	DF	(Germany)	Kevin Wolze	29	EU	VfL Osnabrück	End of contract	Summer	Free	VfL Osnabrück
18	DF	(Germany)	Thomas Blomeyer	23	EU	Austria Klagenfurt	Transfer	Summer	Free	Austria Klagenfurt
20	MF	(Brazil)	Cauly Oliveira Souza	23	Non-EU	SC Paderborn	End of contract	Summer	Free	SC Paderborn
21	MF	(Austria)	Christian Gartner	25	EU		End of contract	Summer	Free	MSV Duisburg
23	DF	(Germany)	Yanni Regäsel	23	EU		End of contract	Summer	Free	MSV Duisburg
24	FW	(Ukraine)	Borys Tashchy	25	EU	FC St. Pauli	End of contract	Summer	Free	FC St. Pauli
25	FW	(Germany)	Jan-Niklas Pia	19	EU	Borussia Mönchengladbach II	End of contract	Summer	Free	Borussia Mönchengladbach
27	GK	(Germany)	Daniel Mesenhöler	23	EU	Viktoria Köln	End of contract	Summer	Free	Viktoria Köln
28	FW	(Norway)	Håvard Nielsen	25	EU	Fortuna Düsseldorf	End of loan	Summer	Free	MSV Duisburg
30	GK	(Germany)	Felix Wiedwald	29	EU	Eintracht Frankfurt	End of loan	Summer	Free	MSV Duisburg
36	MF	(United States)	Joe Gyau	26	EU	(United States) FC Cincinnati	Transfer	Summer	Undisclosed	FC Cincinnati
2	DF	(Germany)	Florian Brügmann	28	EU	Energie Cottbus	Contract terminated	Winter	Free	Energie Cottbus
29	DF	(Germany)	Sebastian Neumann	28	EU	Retired	Retired	Winter		MSV Duisburg

=== New contracts ===
Number	Position	Player	Contract length	Contract end	Date
26	FW	Vincent Gembalies			11 June 2019
33	DF	Moritz Stoppelkamp			11 June 2019
14	MF	Tim Albutat	2-year	2021	12 June 2019
13	MF	Lukas Daschner	1-year	2021	17 August 2019
20	FW	Leroy-Jacques Mickels	1-year	2021	18 December 2019

== Friendlies ==
16 June 2019 1	SV Wanheim	0–12	MSV Duisburg	Duisburg
15:00		Report	Mickels 1', 13', 32', 71'; Gembalies 17'; Engin 30' (pen.), 38' (pen.), 40', 69'; Daschner 44', 66'; Stoppelkamp 77'	Attendance: 1,300; Referee: Okan Uyma

21 June 2019 2	SV Sonsbeck	0–6	MSV Duisburg	Duisburg
19:00		Report	Mickels 46', 85', 86'; Ben Balla 58'; Albutat 72'; Karweina 86'	Attendance: 1,500; Referee: Florian Heien

23 June 2019 3	Duisburg All-stars	0–9	MSV Duisburg	Duisburg
15:00		Report	Scepanik 25', 69'; Ben Balla 36'; Stoppelkamp 50', 70', 90'; Bitter 52'; Daschner 83', 87'	Stadium: PCC-Stadion; Attendance: 1,400

28 June 2019 4	MSV Duisburg	3–1	Wuppertaler SV	Duisburg
	Daschner 26', 29'; Stoppelkamp 50'	Report	Marzulu 58'	Attendance: 0
Note: The game was played behind closed doors.

2 July 2019 5	MSV Duisburg (Germany)	1–2	(Ukraine) FC Oleksandriya	Mierlo, Netherlands
	Karweina 64'	Report	83'; 87'	Stadium: SC Irene; Attendance: 0
Note: The game was played behind closed doors.

6 July 2019 6	FC Utrecht (Netherlands)	3–2	(Germany) MSV Duisburg	Utrecht
	Lonwijk 47'; Gustafson 57'; El Barjiji 69'	Report	Slišković 10'; Stoppelkamp 75'
Note: The game was played behind closed doors.

13 July 2019 7	MSV Duisburg (Germany)	1–1 (3–3 p)	(England) Stoke City	Duisburg
15:00	Vermeij 34'	Report	Clucas 67'	Stadium: MSV-Arena; Attendance: 7,000; Referee: Fasihullah Habibi
	Penalties
	Karweina (penalty scored) (penalty scored) (penalty scored)		(penalty scored) (penalty scored) (penalty scored) Butland

14 November 2019 8	MSV Duisburg (Germany)	2–1	(Netherlands) De Graafschap	Duisburg
14:00	Engin 23', 83'	Report	Hamdaoui 45'	Attendance: 200; Referee: Fasihullah Habibi

8 January 2020 9	Portimonense S.C. (Portugal)	3–2	(Germany) MSV Duisburg	Portimão
15:30	Moreno 66'; Martínez 80'; Dener 88'	Report	Daschner 36'; Engin 64'	Stadium: Estádio Municipal de Portimão; Attendance: 30

11 January 2020 10	SBV Vitesse (Netherlands)	1–3	(Germany) MSV Duisburg	Albufeira, Portugal
16:00	Bazoer 49'	Report	Daschner 75'; Engin 76' (pen.); Slišković 81'	Stadium: Amendoeira Resort; Attendance: 100

18 January 2020 11	MSV Duisburg (Germany)	3–1	(Germany) Borussia Mönchengladbach	Mönchengladbach
17:00	Romano 25'; Vermeij 49'; Engin 60'	Report	Doucouré 7'	Attendance: 50; Referee: Guido Winkmann

18 January 2020 12	MSV Duisburg (Germany)	1–1	(Germany) SV Rödinghausen	Duisburg
17:00	Daschner 16'	Report	Kurzen 69'	Attendance: 500; Referee: Fabian Maibaum

== Competitions ==
Times from 1 July to 27 October 2019 and from 30 March to 30 June 2020 are UTC+2, from 28 October 2019 to 29 March 2020 UTC+1.

=== Overview ===
Competition	First match	Last match	Starting round	Final position	Record							
Competition	First match	Last match	Starting round	Final position	Pld	W	D	L	GF	GA	GD	Win %
3. Liga	20 July 2019	16 May 2020	Matchday 1	5th	38	17	11	10	68	48	+20	44.74
DFB-Pokal	11 August 2019	20 October 2019	Round 1	Round 2	2	1	0	1	2	2	+0	50.00
Lower Rhine Cup	7 September 2019	12 October 2019	Round 1	Round 2	2	1	0	1	11	2	+9	50.00
Total					42	19	11	12	81	52	+29	45.24

Last updated: 4 July 2020
Source: Soccerway

=== 3. Liga ===
==== League table ====
Pos	Team	Pld	W	D	L	GF	GA	GD	Pts	Promotion, qualification or relegation
3	Eintracht Braunschweig (P)	38	18	10	10	64	53	+11	64	Promotion to 2. Bundesliga and qualification for DFB-Pokal
4	FC Ingolstadt	38	17	12	9	61	40	+21	63	Qualification for promotion play-offs and DFB-Pokal
5	MSV Duisburg	38	17	11	10	68	48	+20	62	Qualification for DFB-Pokal
6	Hansa Rostock	38	17	8	13	54	43	+11	59	
7	SV Meppen	38	16	10	12	69	57	+12	58	

Source: DFB
Rules for classification: 1) Points; 2) Goal difference; 3) Goals scored; 4) Head-to-head results; 5) Head-to-head away goals scored; 6) Away goals scored; 7) Play-off.
(P) Promoted

==== Results summary ====
Overall								Home						Away					
Pld	W	D	L	GF	GA	GD	Pts	W	D	L	GF	GA	GD	W	D	L	GF	GA	GD
38	17	11	10	68	48	+20	62	11	6	2	37	20	+17	6	5	8	31	28	+3

Last updated: 4 July 2020.
Source: DFB

==== Result round by round ====
Round	1	2	3	4	5	6	7	8	9	10	11	12	13	14	15	16	17	18	19	20	21	22	23	24	25	26	27	28	29	30	31	32	33	34	35	36	37	38
Ground	H	A	H	A	H	A	H	A	H	A	A	H	A	H	A	H	A	H	A	A	H	A	H	A	H	A	H	A	H	H	A	H	A	H	A	H	A	H
Result	W	L	W	W	W	L	D	W	W	L	L	W	W	W	W	W	L	W	D	D	D	W	D	L	L	L	W	L	D	W	W	D	D	D	L	D	D	W
Position	1	8	3	2	2	3	6	5	4	4	4	3	2	1	1	1	1	1	1	1	1	1	1	1	1	1	1	1	1	1	1	1	2	3	5	5	5	5

Source: DFB
A = Away; H = Home; W = Win; D = Draw; L = Loss

==== Matches ====
20 July 2019 1	MSV Duisburg	4–1	Sonnenhof Großaspach	Duisburg
14:00	Vermeij 25'; Stoppelkamp 55', 56'; Krempicki 60'	Report	Imbongo 42'	Stadium: MSV-Arena; Attendance: 12,831; Referee: Sascha Stegemann

27 July 2019 2	FC Ingolstadt	3–2	MSV Duisburg	Ingolstadt
14:00	Kutschke 32'; Beister 59', 71'	Report	Daschner 60'; Stoppelkamp 86'	Stadium: Audi Sportpark; Attendance: 7,000; Referee: Matthias Jöllenbeck

31 July 2019 3	MSV Duisburg	2–0	Preußen Münster	Duisburg
19:00	Albutat 49'; Stoppelkamp 70'	Report		Stadium: MSV-Arena; Attendance: 15,505; Referee: Benedikt Kempkes

4 August 2019 4	Eintracht Braunschweig	0–3	MSV Duisburg	Braunschweig
13:00		Report	Nkansah 19' (o.g.); Mickels 81'; Stoppelkamp 84'	Stadium: Eintracht-Stadion; Attendance: 21,195; Referee: Robert Kampka

17 August 2019 5	MSV Duisburg	3–1	FSV Zwickau	Duisburg
14:00	Stoppelkamp 54', 90'; Daschner 68'	Report	Wegkamp 49'	Stadium: MSV-Arena; Attendance: 11,663; Referee: Patrick Hanslbauer

25 August 2019 6	Waldhof Mannheim	4–3	MSV Duisburg	Mannheim
13:00	Diring 18'; Sulejmani 27', 70'; Seegert 74'	Report	Stoppelkamp 30'; Vermeij 33'; Ben Balla 59'	Stadium: Carl-Benz-Stadion; Attendance: 12,169; Referee: Harm Osmers

13 September 2019 7	1. FC Magdeburg	1–1	MSV Duisburg	Magdeburg
19:00	Müller 90+3'	Report	Mickels 14'	Stadium: MDCC-Arena; Attendance: 16,963; Referee: Jonas Weickenmeier

21 September 2019 8	MSV Duisburg	2–1	1860 Munich	Duisburg
14:00	Vermeij 15'; Daschner 52'	Report	Owusu 1'	Stadium: MSV-Arena; Attendance: 15,505; Referee: Eric Müller

28 September 2019 9	Carl Zeiss Jena	1–2	MSV Duisburg	Jena
14:00	Bock 59'	Report	Stoppelkamp 75'; Vermeij 86'	Stadium: Ernst-Abbe-Sportfeld; Attendance: 4,637; Referee: Franz Bokop

2 October 2019 10	MSV Duisburg	1–3	SV Meppen	Duisburg
19:00	Daschner 6'	Report	Kleinsorge 15', 40'; Undav 18'	Stadium: MSV-Arena; Attendance: 15,192; Referee: Florian Exner
Note: The match, originally scheduled for 31 August, was postponed due to safety concerns about the stadium roof.

6 October 2019 11	Chemnitzer FC	3–1	MSV Duisburg	Chemnitz
14:00	Garcia 57'; Bonga 60'; Tallig 78'	Report	Engin 77'	Stadium: Stadion an der Gellertstraße; Attendance: 4,059; Referee: Pascal Müller

18 October 2019 12	MSV Duisburg	3–1	1. FC Kaiserslautern	Duisburg
19:00	Daschner 11'; Stoppelkamp 24'; Mickels 52'	Report	Thiele 73'	Stadium: MSV-Arena; Attendance: 14,108; Referee: Marco Fritz

26 October 2019 13	Würzburger Kickers	0–2	MSV Duisburg	Würzburg
14:00		Report	Stoppelkamp 17'; Daschner 45'	Stadium: Flyeralarm Arena; Attendance: 5,355; Referee: Eric Müller

4 November 2019 14	MSV Duisburg	2–0	KFC Uerdingen	Duisburg
19:00	Daschner 22'; Mickels 45+1'	Report		Stadium: MSV-Arena; Attendance: 15,442; Referee: Alexander Sather

9 November 2019 15	Hansa Rostock	1–2	MSV Duisburg	Rostock
14:00	Nartey 55'	Report	Scepanik 53'; Vermeij 82'	Stadium: Ostseestadion; Attendance: 13,732; Referee: Tobias Reichel

25 November 2019 16	MSV Duisburg	2–1	Viktoria Köln	Duisburg
19:00	Vermeij 42'; Scepanik 85'	Report	Bunjaku 24'	Stadium: MSV-Arena; Attendance: 11,807; Referee: Michael Bacher

30 November 2019 17	Hallescher FC	1–0	MSV Duisburg	Halle
14:00	Boyd 89'	Report		Stadium: Erdgas Sportpark; Attendance: 7,508; Referee: Daniel Siebert

8 December 2019 18	MSV Duisburg	3–2	Bayern Munich II	Duisburg
14:00	Albutat 31'; Vermeij 36'; Scepanik 67'	Report	Wriedt 55' (pen.), 90'	Stadium: MSV-Arena; Attendance: 13,380; Referee: Asmir Osmanagic

15 December 2019 19	SpVgg Unterhaching	2–2	MSV Duisburg	Unterhaching
14:00	Schröter 23'; Heinrich 45+1'	Report	Vermeij 15'; Daschner 31'	Stadium: Sportpark Unterhaching; Attendance: 3,750; Referee: Christof Günsch

21 December 2019 20	SG Sonnenhof Großaspach	1–1	MSV Duisburg	Aspach
14:00	Martinović 5'	Report	Stoppelkamp 77'	Stadium: Mechatronik Arena; Attendance: 2,207; Referee: Wolfgang Haslberger

25 January 2020 21	MSV Duisburg	1–1	FC Ingolstadt	Duisburg
14:00	Stoppelkamp 86' (pen.)	Report	Eckert 71'	Stadium: MSV-Arena; Attendance: 14,513; Referee: Frank Willenborg

1 February 2020 22	Preußen Münster	1–4	MSV Duisburg	Münster
14:00	Scherder 37'	Report	Slišković 11', 56'; Engin 43', 70'	Stadium: Preußenstadion; Attendance: 8,903; Referee: Michael Bacher

7 February 2020 23	MSV Duisburg	1–1	Eintracht Braunschweig	Duisburg
19:00	Engin 74'	Report	Ziegele 44'	Stadium: MSV-Arena; Attendance: 14,849; Referee: Patrick Alt

16 February 2020 24	FSV Zwickau	1–0	MSV Duisburg	Zwickau
13:00	Wegkamp 60'	Report		Stadium: Stadion Zwickau; Attendance: 4,369; Referee: Florian Lechner

22 February 2020 25	MSV Duisburg	2–3	Waldhof Mannheim	Duisburg
14:00	Vermeij 4', 43'	Report	G. Korte 54', 58' (pen.); Schuster 86'	Stadium: MSV-Arena; Attendance: 12,037; Referee: Nicolas Winter

1 March 2020 26	SV Meppen	1–0	MSV Duisburg	Meppen
14:00	Tankulić 81'	Report		Stadium: Hänsch-Arena; Attendance: 10,748; Referee: Michael Bacher

6 March 2020 27	MSV Duisburg	1–0	1. FC Magdeburg	Duisburg
19:00	Ben Balla 26'	Report		Stadium: MSV-Arena; Attendance: 12,239; Referee: Florian Badstübner

31 May 2020 28	1860 Munich	3–2	MSV Duisburg	Munich
13:00	Dressel 57'; Bekiroğlu 73'; Owusu 86'	Report	Compper 34'; Vermeij 49'	Stadium: Grünwalder Stadion; Attendance: 0 Referee: Florian Badstübner
Note: The match was originally scheduled to take place on 14 March 2020 but was postponed due to the COVID-19 pandemic. The match was played behind closed doors.

3 June 2020 29	MSV Duisburg	1–1	Carl Zeiss Jena	Duisburg
19:00	Vermeij 14'	Report	Vermeij 62' (o.g.)	Stadium: MSV-Arena; Attendance: 0 Referee: Mitja Stegemann
Note: The match was originally scheduled to take place at on 18 March 2020 but was postponed due to the COVID-19 pandemic. The match was played behind closed doors.

6 June 2020 30	MSV Duisburg	2–1	Chemnitzer FC	Duisburg
14:00	Daschner 11'; Stoppelkamp 80'	Report	Garcia 54'	Stadium: MSV-Arena; Attendance: 0 Referee: Johann Pfeifer
Note: The match was originally scheduled to take place at on 21 March 2020 but was postponed due to the COVID-19 pandemic. The match was played behind closed doors.

10 June 2020 31	1. FC Kaiserslautern	1–3	MSV Duisburg	Kaiserslautern
20:30	Thiele 31' (pen.)	Report	Mickels 9'; Vermeij 32'; Jansen 49'	Stadium: Fritz-Walter-Stadion; Attendance: 0 Referee: Nicolas Winter
Note: The match was originally scheduled to take place at on 28 March 2020 but was postponed due to the COVID-19 pandemic. The match was played behind closed doors.

13 June 2020 32	MSV Duisburg	1–1	Würzburger Kickers	Duisburg
14:00	Karweina 90+2'	Report	Hansen 45+4'	Stadium: MSV-Arena; Attendance: 0 Referee: Justus Zorn
Note: The match was originally scheduled to take place at on 6 April 2020 but was postponed due to the COVID-19 pandemic. The match was played behind closed doors.

17 June 2020 33	KFC Uerdingen	1–1	MSV Duisburg	Düsseldorf
20:30	Kobiljar 68'	Report	Karweina 56'	Stadium: Merkur Spiel-Arena; Attendance: 0 Referee: Florian Exner
Note: The match was originally scheduled to take place at on 11 to 13 April 2020 but was postponed due to the COVID-19 pandemic. The match was played behind closed doors.

20 June 2020 34	MSV Duisburg	0–0	Hansa Rostock	Duisburg
14:00		Report		Stadium: MSV-Arena; Attendance: 0 Referee: Harm Osmers
Note: The match was originally scheduled to take place at on 17 to 20 April 2020 but was postponed due to the COVID-19 pandemic. The match was played behind closed doors.

23 June 2020 35	Viktoria Köln	1–0	MSV Duisburg	Cologne
20:30	Bunjaku 49'	Report		Stadium: Sportpark Höhenberg; Attendance: 0 Referee: Thorben Siewer
Note: The match was originally scheduled to take place at on 24 to 27 April 2020 but was postponed due to the COVID-19 pandemic. The match was played behind closed doors.

27 June 2020 36	MSV Duisburg	2–2	Hallescher FC	Duisburg
14:00	Slišković 35'; Daschner 76'	Report	Syhre 25', 32'	Stadium: MSV-Arena; Attendance: 0 Referee: Benedikt Kempkes
Note: The match was originally scheduled to take place at on 2 to 4 May 2020 but was postponed due to the COVID-19 pandemic. The match was played behind closed doors.

1 July 2020 37	Bayern Munich II	2–2	MSV Duisburg	Munich
19:00	Kern 69'; Dajaku 90+2'	Report	Vermeij 30'; Daschner 83'	Stadium: Grünwalder Stadion; Attendance: 0 Referee: Daniel Schlager
Note: The match was originally scheduled to take place at on 9 May 2020 but was postponed due to the COVID-19 pandemic. The match was played behind closed doors.

4 July 2020 38	MSV Duisburg	4–0	SpVgg Unterhaching	Duisburg
14:00	Engin 45+1'; Karweina 54'; Slišković 67'; Stoppelkamp 72'	Report		Stadium: MSV-Arena; Attendance: 0 Referee: Florian Heft
Note: The match was originally scheduled to take place at on 16 May 2020 but was postponed due to the COVID-19 pandemic. The match was played behind closed doors.

=== DFB-Pokal ===
11 August 2019 Round 1	MSV Duisburg	2–0	Greuther Fürth	Duisburg
18:30	Daschner 4'; Albutat 14'	Report		Stadium: MSV-Arena; Attendance: 13,542; Referee: Christian Dingert

29 October 2019 Round 2	MSV Duisburg	0–2	1899 Hoffenheim	Duisburg
18:30		Report	Grillitsch 53'; Adamyan 59'	Stadium: MSV-Arena; Attendance: 14,306; Referee: Sören Storks

=== Lower Rhine Cup ===
7 September 2019 Round 1	SC 1920 Oberhausen	0–11	MSV Duisburg	Oberhausen
15:00		Report	Ben Balla 6', 53' (pen.); Stoppelkamp 17', 47', 50', 54'; Vermeij 21', 69'; Karweina 46', 55', 83'	Stadium: Niederrheinstadion; Attendance: 3,700; Referee: Markus Wollenweber

12 October 2019 Round 2	SSVg Velbert	2–0	MSV Duisburg	Velbert
14:00	Machtemes 22'; Nnaji 33'	Report		Stadium: Christopeit Sport Arena; Attendance: 1,350; Referee: Jonathan Becker

== Statistics ==
=== Squad statistics ===
No.	Pos	Nat	Player	Total		3. Liga		DFB-Pokal		Lower Rhine Cup	
No.	Pos	Nat	Player	Apps	Goals	Apps	Goals	Apps	Goals	Apps	Goals
1	GK	(Germany) GER	Leo Weinkauf	31	0	28	0	2	0	1	0
4	MF	(Romania) ROU	Darius Ghindovean	3	0	3	0	0	0	0	0
5	DF	(Germany) GER	Marvin Compper	25	1	23	1	1	0	1	0
6	MF	(Germany) GER	Connor Krempicki	18	1	17	1	1	0	0	0
7	MF	(Germany) GER	Lukas Scepanik	26	3	24	3	1	0	1	0
8	DF	(Germany) GER	Migel Schmeling	10	0	8	0	1	0	1	0
9	MF	(Germany) GER	Ahmet Engin	24	5	23	5	0	0	1	0
10	MF	(Germany) GER	Moritz Stoppelkamp	36	19	33	15	2	0	1	4
11	MF	(Germany) GER	Arnold Budimbu	22	0	20	0	1	0	1	0
13	MF	(Germany) GER	Lukas Daschner	38	12	34	11	2	1	2	0
14	MF	(Germany) GER	Tim Albutat	37	3	33	2	2	1	2	0
15	DF	(Germany) GER	Matthias Rahn	9	0	9	0	0	0	0	0
17	DF	(Germany) GER	Arne Sicker	34	0	30	0	2	0	2	0
19	FW	(Germany) GER	Sinan Karweina	16	6	13	3	1	0	2	3
20	FW	(Germany) GER	Leroy-Jacques Mickels	41	5	37	5	2	0	2	0
21	DF	(Germany) GER	Maximilian Jansen	27	1	24	1	1	0	2	0
22	GK	(Germany) GER	Jonas Brendieck	1	0	0	0	0	0	1	0
23	DF	(Germany) GER	Joshua Bitter	29	0	25	0	2	0	2	0
24	FW	(Netherlands) NED	Vincent Vermeij	36	16	33	14	1	0	2	2
25	FW	(Croatia) CRO	Petar Slišković	28	4	26	4	1	0	1	0
26	DF	(Germany) GER	Vincent Gembalies	24	0	21	0	1	0	2	0
28	MF	(France) FRA	Yassin Ben Balla	34	4	32	2	1	0	1	2
30	GK	(Switzerland) SUI	Steven Deana	0	0	0	0	0	0	0	0
33	DF	(Germany) GER	Lukas Boeder	38	0	34	0	2	0	2	0
35	FW	(Germany) GER	Cem Sabanci	0	0	0	0	0	0	0	0
	DF	(Germany) GER	Florian Brügmann^{†}	6	0	6	0	0	0	0	0
	DF	(Germany) GER	Sebastian Neumann^{†}	1	0	1	0	0	0	0	0
	DF	(Germany) GER	Thomas Blomeyer^{†}	0	0	0	0	0	0	0	0

Last updated: 4 July 2020
Source: Soccerway

- ^{†} Players who left the club mid-season.

=== Goals ===
Rank	Player	Position	3. Liga	DFB-Pokal	LR Cup	Total
1	(Germany) Moritz Stoppelkamp	MF	15	0	4	19
2	(Netherlands) Vincent Vermeij	FW	14	0	2	16
3	(Germany) Lukas Daschner	MF	11	1	0	12
4	(Germany) Sinan Karweina	FW	3	0	3	6
5	(Germany) Ahmet Engin	MF	5	0	0	5
5	(Germany) Leroy-Jacques Mickels	FW	5	0	0	5
7	(France) Yassin Ben Balla	MF	2	0	2	4
7	(Croatia) Petar Slišković	FW	4	0	0	4
9	(Germany) Tim Albutat	MF	2	1	0	3
9	(Germany) Lukas Scepanik	MF	3	0	0	3
11	(Germany) Marvin Compper	DF	1	0	0	1
11	(Germany) Maximilian Jansen	MF	1	0	0	1
11	(Germany) Connor Krempicki	MF	1	0	0	1
14	Own goals		1	0	0	1
Total			68	2	11	81

=== Clean sheets ===
Rank	Name	3. Liga	DFB-Pokal	LR Cup	Total
1	(Germany) Leo Weinkauf	7	1	1	9
Total		7	1	1	9

=== Disciplinary record ===
N	P	Nat.	Name	3. Liga			DFB-Pokal			LR Cup			Total			Notes
N	P	Nat.	Name	Yellow card	Second yellow card	Red card	Yellow card	Second yellow card	Red card	Yellow card	Second yellow card	Red card	Yellow card	Second yellow card	Red card	Notes
17	DF	(Germany)	Arne Sicker	5		1							5		1	
9	MF	(Germany)	Ahmet Engin	1		1							1		1	
10	MF	(Germany)	Moritz Stoppelkamp	7			1						8			
14	MF	(Germany)	Tim Albutat	7			1						8			
13	MF	(Germany)	Lukas Daschner	5									5			
24	FW	(Netherlands)	Vincent Vermeij	5									5			
20	FW	(Germany)	Leroy-Jacques Mickels	4									4			
28	MF	(France)	Yassin Ben Balla	4									4			
7	DF	(Germany)	Lukas Scepanik	3									3			
11	MF	(Germany)	Arnold Budimbu	3									3			
21	MF	(Germany)	Maximilian Jansen	3									3			
23	DF	(Germany)	Joshua Bitter	2			1						3			
5	DF	(Germany)	Marvin Compper	2									2			
6	MF	(Germany)	Connor Krempicki	2									2			
26	DF	(Germany)	Vincent Gembalies	2									2			
1	GK	(Germany)	Leo Weinkauf	1									1			
2	DF	(Germany)	Florian Brügmann	1									1			
8	DF	(Germany)	Migel Schmeling	1									1			
15	DF	(Germany)	Matthias Rahn	1									1			
25	FW	(Croatia)	Petar Slišković	1									1			

Last updated: 4 July 2020
Source: Soccerway
Only competitive matches
(yellow card) = Number of bookings; (second yellow card) = Number of sending offs after a second yellow card; (red card) = Number of sending offs by a direct red card.
