= 2020–21 MSV Duisburg season =

MSV Duisburg
2020–21 season
- Manager: Torsten Lieberknecht (until 10 November); Gino Lettieri (from 15 November until 27 January 2021); Uwe Schubert (from 27 January 2021 until 2 February 2021); Pavel Dochev (from 2 February 2021)
- 3. Liga: 15th
- DFB-Pokal: First round
- Lower Rhine Cup: Semifinals
- Top goalscorer: League: Moritz Stoppelkamp (10); All: Moritz Stoppelkamp (14)
- Highest home attendance: 3,462 (vs Zwickau, 26 September 2020)
- Average home league attendance: 182 (Note: Only the first homegame was played in front of spectators, all other matches were played behind closed doors.)
- Biggest win: Duisburg 4–1 Wiesbaden; Wiesbaden 0–3 Duisburg
- Biggest defeat: Duisburg 0–4 Verl; Duisburg 1–5 Ingolstadt
Home colours	Away colours	Third colours

The 2020–21 MSV Duisburg season was the 121st season in the club's football history. In 2020–21 the club played in the 3. Liga, the third tier of German football alongside the DFB-Pokal and the Lower Rhine Cup.

== Team ==
Note: Flags indicate national team as defined under FIFA eligibility rules; some limited exceptions apply. Players may hold more than one non-FIFA nationality.

No.	Pos.	Nation	Player
1	GK	GER	Leo Weinkauf (on loan from Hannover 96)
2	DF	GER	Maximilian Sauer
3	DF	GER	Dominik Schmidt
4	DF	GER	Dominic Volkmer
5	MF	MNE	Mirnes Pepić
6	MF	GER	Connor Krempicki
7	MF	GER	Lukas Scepanik
8	MF	ROU	Darius Ghindovean
9	MF	GER	Ahmet Engin
10	MF	GER	Moritz Stoppelkamp (Captain)
13	FW	GER	Julian Hettwer
14	DF	BUL	Stefan Velkov
15	DF	GER	Tobias Fleckstein
17	DF	GER	Arne Sicker
19	FW	GER	Sinan Karweina

No.	Pos.	Nation	Player
20	FW	GER	Leroy-Jacques Mickels
21	MF	GER	Maximilian Jansen
22	GK	GER	Jonas Brendieck
23	DF	GER	Joshua Bitter
24	FW	NED	Vincent Vermeij (Vice-captain)
26	DF	GER	Vincent Gembalies
27	DF	GER	Niko Bretschneider
28	MF	GER	David Tomić
29	FW	SUI	Orhan Ademi
30	GK	SUI	Steven Deana
31	FW	GER	Federico Palacios Martínez
35	FW	GER	Cem Sabancı
36	MF	COD	Wilson Kamavuaka
37	MF	GER	Marlon Frey
39	FW	MAR	Aziz Bouhaddouz

== Transfers ==
=== In ===
Date	Pos.	Name	From	Type	Ref.
27 July 2020	DF	(Germany) Niko Bretschneider	Hertha BSC II	Transfer	
31 July 2020	DF	(Germany) Dominic Volkmer	Carl Zeiss Jena	Transfer	
7 August 2020	DF	(Germany) Maximilian Sauer	Greuther Fürth	Transfer	
14 August 2020	MF	(Montenegro) Mirnes Pepić	Hansa Rostock	Transfer	
18 August 2020	DF	(Germany) Dominik Schmidt	Holstein Kiel	Transfer	
24 August 2020	DF	(Germany) Tobias Fleckstein	Holstein Kiel	Transfer	
31 August 2020	MF	(Democratic Republic of the Congo) Wilson Kamavuaka	GKS Tychy	Transfer	
1 September 2020	FW	(Switzerland) Orhan Ademi	Eintracht Braunschweig	Transfer	
3 September 2020	MF	(Germany) David Tomić	VfB Stuttgart II	Transfer	
20 January 2021	FW	(Germany) Federico Palacios Martínez	Jahn Regensburg	Loan	
21 January 2021	MF	(Germany) Marlon Frey	SV Sandhausen	Transfer	
23 January 2021	DF	(Bulgaria) Stefan Velkov	KFC Uerdingen	Transfer	
1 February 2021	FW	(Morocco) Aziz Bouhaddouz	SV Sandhausen	Transfer	

=== Out ===
Date	Pos.	Name	To	Type	Ref.
6 July 2020	DF	(Germany) Migel Schmeling	Borussia Dortmund II	End of contract	
8 July 2020	DF	(Germany) Matthias Rahn	Energie Cottbus	End of contract	
24 July 2020	DF	(Germany) Lukas Boeder	Hallescher FC	End of contract	
28 July 2020	MF	(France) Yassin Ben Balla	Eintracht Braunschweig	End of contract	
1 August 2020	DF	(Germany) Marvin Compper	Retired		
2 August 2020	MF	(Germany) Tim Albutat	KFC Uerdingen	Transfer	
14 August 2020	MF	(Germany) Lukas Daschner	FC St. Pauli	Transfer	
29 August 2020	FW	(Croatia) Petar Slišković	Türkgücü München	Transfer	
3 February 2021	MF	(Germany) Arnold Budimbu	TSV Steinbach Haiger	Transfer	

=== New contracts ===
Date	Pos.	Name	Contract length	Contract end	Ref.
7 July 2020	MF	Darius Ghindovean	1-year	2021	
7 July 2020	FW	Cem Sabanci	1-year	2021	
28 July 2020	MF	Connor Krempicki	1-year	2021	

== Friendlies ==
8 August 2020 1	MSV Duisburg	1–0	Preußen Münster	Duisburg
11:00	Stoppelkamp 36'	Report		Stadium: BSA Westender Straße; Attendance: 0 Referee: Martin Ulankiewicz
Note: The match was played over 2 x 35 minutes and behind closed doors.

15 August 2020 2	Borussia Mönchengladbach	4–0	MSV Duisburg	Mönchengladbach
14:00	Lainer 52'; Neuhaus 60'; Embolo 63'; Herrmann 70'	Report		Stadium: Fohlenplatz; Attendance: 0 Referee: Guido Winkmann
Note: The match was played behind closed doors.

22 August 2020 3	MSV Duisburg	1–5	Borussia Dortmund	Duisburg
15:30	Engin 28'	Report	Reyna 14'; Hazard 15'; Sancho 26'; Knauff 49', 59'	Stadium: MSV-Arena; Attendance: 0
Note: The match was played over 2x30 minutes and behind closed doors.

22 August 2020 4	MSV Duisburg (Germany)	1–2	(Netherlands) Feyenoord	Duisburg
18:00	Karweina 57'	Report	Toornstra 14'; Narsingh 45'	Stadium: MSV-Arena; Attendance: 0
Note: The match was played over 2x30 minutes and behind closed doors.

29 August 2020 5	Heracles Almelo (Netherlands)	1–1	(Germany) MSV Duisburg	Almelo
18:00	Pröpper 52'	Report	Karweina 70'	Stadium: Erve Asito; Attendance: 0
Note: The match was played behind closed doors.

2 September 2020 6	Arminia Bielefeld	3–2	MSV Duisburg	Bielefeld
15:30	Klos 19' (pen.); Córdova 63', 88'	Report	Stoppelkamp 16'; Engin 48'	Stadium: Bielefelder Alm; Attendance: 0 Referee: Martin Thomsen
Note: The match was played behind closed doors.

8 September 2020 7	PSV Eindhoven (Netherlands)	Cancelled	(Germany) MSV Duisburg	Eindhoven
				Stadium: Philips Stadion
Note: The game was cancelled, as PSV Eindhoven had several players on international duty.

3 January 2021 8	MSV Duisburg	0–2	Wehen Wiesbaden	Duisburg
14:00		Report	Bischof 82'; Tietz 88'	Attendance: 0
Note: The match was played behind closed doors.

6 January 2021 9	MSV Duisburg	1–1	SV Rödinghausen	Duisburg
14:00	Hettwer 26'	Report	Budimbu 54' (o.g.)	Attendance: Thibaut Scheer; Referee: 0
Note: The match was played behind closed doors.

21 February 2021 10	MSV Duisburg	2–1	Preußen Münster	Duisburg
	Mickels 13'; Tomić 78'	Report	Schwadorf 40'	Attendance: 0
Note: The match was played behind closed doors.

25 March 2021 11	SC Paderborn	4–1	MSV Duisburg	Paderborn
	Akolo 9', 88'; Terrazzino 15'; El-Faouzi 78'	Report	Ademi 77'	Attendance: 0
Note: The match was played behind closed doors.

== Competitions ==
Times from 1 July to 25 October 2020 and from 28 March to 30 June 2021 are UTC+2, from 26 October 2020 to 27 March 2021 UTC+1.

=== Overview ===
Competition	First match	Last match	Starting round	Final position	Record							
Competition	First match	Last match	Starting round	Final position	Pld	W	D	L	GF	GA	GD	Win %
3. Liga	19 September 2020	22 May 2021	Matchday 1		38	11	10	17	52	67	−15	28.95
DFB-Pokal	14 September 2020	14 September 2020	Round 1	Round 1	1	0	0	1	0	5	−5	0.00
Lower Rhine Cup	12 May 2021	19 May 2021	Quarterfinals	Semifinals	2	1	0	1	7	6	+1	50.00
Total					41	12	10	19	59	78	−19	29.27

Last updated: 22 May 2021
Source: Soccerway

=== 3. Liga ===
==== League table ====
Pos	Team	Pld	W	D	L	GF	GA	GD	Pts	Qualification or relegation
13	Türkgücü München	38	12	11	15	45	55	−10	47	
14	1. FC Kaiserslautern	38	8	19	11	47	52	−5	43	
15	MSV Duisburg	38	11	10	17	52	67	−15	43	
16	KFC Uerdingen (Note: KFC Uerdingen were deducted three points, after they filed for insolvency.) (R)	38	11	11	16	38	50	−12	41	Relegation to Regionalliga (Note: KFC Uerdingen did not obtain a license for the next season and was therefore relegated, sparing SV Meppen from relegation.)
17	SV Meppen	38	12	5	21	37	61	−24	41	

Source: DFB
Rules for classification: 1) Points; 2) Goal difference; 3) Goals scored; 4) Head-to-head results; 5) Head-to-head away goals scored; 6) Away goals scored; 7) Play-off.
(R) Relegated

==== Results summary ====
Overall								Home						Away					
Pld	W	D	L	GF	GA	GD	Pts	W	D	L	GF	GA	GD	W	D	L	GF	GA	GD
38	11	10	17	52	66	−14	43	6	5	8	26	34	−8	5	5	9	26	32	−6

Last updated: 22 May 2021.
Source: DFB

==== Result round by round ====
Round	1	2	3	4	5	6	7	8	9	10	11	12	13	14	15	16	17	18	19	20	21	22	23	24	25	26	27	28	29	30	31	32	33	34	35	36	37	38
Ground	A	H	A	A	H	A	H	H	A	H	H	A	H	A	H	A	A	H	H	H	A	H	H	A	A	H	A	A	H	A	H	H	A	A	H	A	H	A
Result	L	D	D	W	L	W	L	L	L	D	L	D	L	D	W	D	L	W	L	L	L	W	W	W	L	W	L	D	W	W	D	D	W	L	D	L	L	L
Position	18	15	17	15	17	16	16	17	18	18	18	18	19	19	19	19	20	19	19	19	20	19	17	14	14	13	15	15	14	12	13	14	13	13	14	14	14	15

Source: DFB
A = Away; H = Home; W = Win; D = Draw; L = Loss

==== Matches ====
19 September 2020 1	Hansa Rostock	3–1	MSV Duisburg	Rostock
14:00	Löhmannsröben 56'; Breier 65', 75'	Report	Scepanik 32'	Stadium: Ostseestadion; Attendance: 7,125; Referee: Max Burda

26 September 2020 2	MSV Duisburg	1–1	FSV Zwickau	Duisburg
14:00	Mickels 74'	Report	König 67'	Stadium: MSV-Arena; Attendance: 3,462; Referee: Florian Heft

3 October 2020 3	VfB Lübeck	1–1	MSV Duisburg	Lübeck
14:00	Deichmann 61'	Report	Vermeij 74'	Stadium: Stadion Lohmühle; Attendance: 1,860; Referee: Eric Müller

21 October 2020 4	SpVgg Unterhaching	0–1	MSV Duisburg	Unterhaching
19:00		Report	Ademi 36'	Stadium: Sportpark Unterhaching; Attendance: 0 (Note: The match was played behind closed doors due to the COVID-19 pandemic in Germany.); Referee: Timo Gerach

24 October 2020 5	MSV Duisburg	0–2	KFC Uerdingen	Duisburg
14:00		Report	Marcussen 48'; Kiprit 71'	Stadium: MSV-Arena; Attendance: 0 Referee: Patrick Hanslbauer

31 October 2020 6	1860 Munich	0–2	MSV Duisburg	Munich
14:00		Report	Fleckstein 62'; Scepanik 90+1'	Stadium: Grünwalder Stadion; Attendance: 0 Referee: Max Burda

4 November 2020 7	MSV Duisburg	2–3	1. FC Saarbrücken	Duisburg
19:00	Budimbu 76'; Vermeij 78'	Report	Shipnoski 38'; Šverko 66'; Jänicke 90+3'	Stadium: MSV-Arena; Attendance: 0 Referee: Patrick Glaser
Note: The match, originally scheduled for 9 October 2020, was postponed due to several positive COVID-19 tests by Duisburg players.

9 November 2020 8	MSV Duisburg	1–3	Viktoria Köln	Duisburg
19:00	Stoppelkamp 21'	Report	Thiele 34'; Bunjaku 52' (pen.); Risse 77'	Stadium: MSV-Arena; Attendance: 0 Referee: Eric Müller

14 November 2020 9	Türkgücü München	2–1	MSV Duisburg	Munich
14:00	Slišković 48', 66'	Report	Vermeij 89' (pen.)	Stadium: Olympiastadion; Attendance: 0 Referee: Benjamin Brand

17 November 2020 10	MSV Duisburg	0–0	Hallescher FC	Duisburg
19:00		Report		Stadium: MSV-Arena; Attendance: 0 Referee: Patrick Schwengers
Note: The match, originally scheduled for 19 October 2020, was postponed due to several positive COVID-19 tests by Duisburg players as well as other players in quarantine.

20 November 2020 11	MSV Duisburg	0–4	SC Verl	Duisburg
19:00		Report	Rabihic 15', 80'; Janjić 59'; Yıldırım 76'	Stadium: MSV-Arena; Attendance: 0 Referee: Robert Kampka

24 November 2020 12	Waldhof Mannheim	2–2	MSV Duisburg	Mannheim
19:00	Ferati 3', 60'	Report	Ghindovean 11'; Stoppelkamp 47'	Stadium: Carl-Benz-Stadion; Attendance: 0 Referee: Wolfgang Haslberger

29 November 2020 13	MSV Duisburg	0–3	Dynamo Dresden	Duisburg
13:00		Report	Hosiner 25'; Weihrauch 53'; Daferner 55'	Stadium: MSV-Arena; Attendance: 0 Referee: Franz Bokop

5 December 2020 14	1. FC Kaiserslautern	2–2	MSV Duisburg	Kaiserslautern
14:00	Pourié 89', 90+1'	Report	Karweina 14'; Engin 64'	Stadium: Fritz-Walter-Stadion; Attendance: 0 Referee: Tobias Fritsch

12 December 2020 15	MSV Duisburg	4–1	Wehen Wiesbaden	Duisburg
14:00	Vermeij 19', 47', 74'; Engin 77'	Report	Guthörl 83'	Stadium: MSV-Arena; Attendance: 0 Referee: Patrick Kessel

16 December 2020 16	Bayern Munich II	1–1	MSV Duisburg	Munich
19:00	Kern 39' (pen.)	Report	Vermeij 65'	Stadium: Grünwalder Stadion; Attendance: 0 Referee: Florian Exner

10 January 2021 17	FC Ingolstadt	2–1	MSV Duisburg	Ingolstadt
13:00	Eckert 16'; Keller 29'	Report	Engin 4'	Stadium: Audi Sportpark; Attendance: 0 Referee: Wolfgang Haslberger

17 January 2021 18	MSV Duisburg	1–0	SV Meppen	Duisburg
14:00	Kamavuaka 21'	Report		Stadium: MSV-Arena; Attendance: 0 Referee: Patrick Alt

20 January 2021 19	MSV Duisburg	1–2	1. FC Magdeburg	Duisburg
19:00	Engin 22'	Report	Granatowski 55'; Bell Bell 64'	Stadium: MSV-Arena; Attendance: 0 Referee: Robert Kampka
Note: The match, originally scheduled for 21 December 2020, was postponed due to a positive COVID-19 test by a Magdeburg player, which put the whole team in quarantine.

23 January 2021 20	MSV Duisburg	1–2	Hansa Rostock	Duisburg
14:00	Sicker 34' (pen.)	Report	Farrona-Pulido 6', 30'	Stadium: MSV-Arena; Attendance: 0 Referee: Konrad Oldhafer

26 January 2021 21	FSV Zwickau	3–1	MSV Duisburg	Zwickau
19:00	Nkansah 4'; Schröter 35', 41'	Report	Hettwer 56'	Stadium: Stadion Zwickau; Attendance: 0 Referee: Tobias Schultes

31 January 2021 22	MSV Duisburg	3–1	VfB Lübeck	Duisburg
13:00	Sicker 26'; Schmdit 45+3'; Palacios Martínez 74'	Report	Okungbowa 83'	Stadium: MSV-Arena; Attendance: 0 Referee: Mitja Stegemann

20 February 2021 23	MSV Duisburg	2–1	SpVgg Unterhaching	Duisburg
14:00	Bouhaddouz 9'; Krempicki 79'	Report	Anspach 19'	Stadium: MSV-Arena; Attendance: 0 Referee: Steven Greif

28 February 2021 24	KFC Uerdingen	1–2	MSV Duisburg	Lotte
14:00	Lukimya 6'	Report	Stoppelkamp 38'; Palacios Martínez 44'	Stadium: Stadion am Lotter Kreuz; Attendance: 0 Referee: Christian Dingert

3 March 2021 25	1. FC Saarbrücken	4–1	MSV Duisburg	Saarbrücken
17:00	Günther-Schmidt 44'; Froese 60'; Gouras 67', 71'	Report	Stoppelkamp 52'	Stadium: Ludwigsparkstadion; Attendance: 0 Referee: Tobias Reichel
Note: The match, originally scheduled for 8 February 2021, was postponed due to an unplayable pitch.

6 March 2021 26	MSV Duisburg	1–0	1860 Munich	Duisburg
14:00	Stoppelkamp 53' (pen.)	Report		Stadium: MSV-Arena; Attendance: 0 Referee: Patrick Kessel

13 March 2021 27	Viktoria Köln	3–1	MSV Duisburg	Cologne
14:00	Cueto 23'; Thiele 35'; Wunderlich 81'	Report	Tomić 41'	Stadium: Sportpark Höhenberg; Attendance: 0 Referee: Max Burda

16 March 2021 28	Hallescher FC	1–1	MSV Duisburg	Halle
19:00	Shcherbakovski 33'	Report	Bouhaddouz 52'	Stadium: Erdgas Sportpark; Attendance: 0 Referee: Lukas Benen
Note: The match, originally scheduled for 13 February 2021, was postponed due to an unplayable pitch.

20 March 2021 29	MSV Duisburg	3–2	Türkgücü München	Duisburg
14:00	Bouhaddouz 47'; Stoppelkamp 66' (pen.); Ademi 88'	Report	Röser 8'; Awoudja 41'	Stadium: MSV-Arena; Attendance: 0 Referee: Tobias Fritsch

3 April 2021 30	SC Verl	1–2	MSV Duisburg	Paderborn
14:00	Eilers 55'	Report	Stoppelkamp 27', 78'	Stadium: Benteler-Arena; Attendance: 0 Referee: Konrad Oldhafer

10 April 2021 31	MSV Duisburg	1–1	Waldhof Mannheim	Duisburg
14:00	Stoppelkamp 24'	Report	Martinović 20'	Stadium: MSV-Arena; Attendance: 0 Referee: Franz Bokop

20 April 2021 32	MSV Duisburg	2–2	1. FC Kaiserslautern	Duisburg
19:00	Götze 55' (o.g.); Kamavuaka 90'	Report	Hanslik 11'; Senger 79'	Stadium: MSV-Arena; Attendance: 0 Referee: Jonas Weickenmeier

25 April 2021 33	Wehen Wiesbaden	0–3	MSV Duisburg	Wiesbaden
14:00		Report	Bouhaddouz 46'; Kamavuaka 66'; Stoppelkamp 72'	Stadium: Brita-Arena; Attendance: 0 Referee: Patrick Hanslbauer

28 April 2021 34	Dynamo Dresden	1–0	MSV Duisburg	Dresden
19:00	Daferner 77'	Report		Stadium: Rudolf-Harbig-Stadion; Attendance: 0 Referee: Asmir Osmanagic
Note: The match, originally scheduled for 17 April 2021, was postponed due to positive COVID-19 tests several Dresden players, which put the whole team in quarantine.

5 May 2021 35	MSV Duisburg	2–2	Bayern Munich II	Duisburg
19:00	Bouhaddouz 15'; Che 61' (o.g.)	Report	Sieb 14'; Arp 74' (pen.)	Stadium: MSV-Arena; Attendance: 0 Referee: Steven Greif

8 May 2021 36	1. FC Magdeburg	3–2	MSV Duisburg	Magdeburg
14:00	Brünker 8'; Ernst 13'; Atik 57'	Report	Tomić 47'; Vermeij 84'	Stadium: MDCC-Arena; Attendance: 0 Referee: Tom Bauer

15 May 2021 37	MSV Duisburg	1–5	FC Ingolstadt	Duisburg
14:00	Sauer 10'	Report	Kutschke 47' (pen.); Bilbija 54', 76'; Gaus 55'; Eckert 65'	Stadium: MSV-Arena; Attendance: 0 Referee: Eric Müller

22 May 2021 38	SV Meppen	2–1	MSV Duisburg	Meppen
13:30	Tankulić 35', 53'	Report	Palacios Martínez 75'	Stadium: Hänsch-Arena; Attendance: 0 Referee: Robert Kampka

=== DFB-Pokal ===
14 September 2020 Round 1	MSV Duisburg	0–5	Borussia Dortmund	Duisburg
20:45		Report	Sancho 14' (pen.); Bellingham 30'; Hazard 39'; Reyna 50'; Reus 58'	Stadium: MSV-Arena; Attendance: 300; Referee: Robert Kampka

=== Lower Rhine Cup ===
The tournament will be played by the seven highest-ranked teams in the german football league system.

12 May 2021 Quarterfinals	KFC Uerdingen	0–5	MSV Duisburg	Velbert
15:00		Report	Stoppelkamp 45+1' (pen.), 63', 75'; Tomić 70'; Ademi 90'	Stadium: Stadion Velbert; Attendance: 0 Referee: Thibaut Scheer

19 May 2021 Semifinals	Wuppertaler SV	6–2	MSV Duisburg	Wuppertal
19:00	Königs 31', 60'; Ametov 35'; Scepanik 47' (o.g.); Salau 83'; Rodrigues-Pires 87'	Report	Salau 20' (o.g.); Stoppelkamp 58' (pen.)	Stadium: Stadion am Zoo; Referee: Robin Delfs

== Statistics ==
=== Squad statistics ===
No.	Pos	Nat	Player	Total		3. Liga		DFB-Pokal		Lower Rhine Cup	
No.	Pos	Nat	Player	Apps	Goals	Apps	Goals	Apps	Goals	Apps	Goals
1	GK	(Germany) GER	Leo Weinkauf	39	0	38	0	1	0	0	0
2	DF	(Germany) GER	Maximilian Sauer	33	1	31	1	1	0	1	0
3	DF	(Germany) GER	Dominik Schmidt	26	1	26	1	0	0	0	0
4	DF	(Germany) GER	Dominic Volkmer	12	0	11	0	1	0	0	0
5	MF	(Montenegro) MNE	Mirnes Pepić	7	0	7	0	0	0	0	0
6	MF	(Germany) GER	Connor Krempicki	33	1	30	1	1	0	2	0
7	MF	(Germany) GER	Lukas Scepanik	27	2	24	2	1	0	2	0
8	MF	(Romania) ROU	Darius Ghindovean	16	1	15	1	1	0	0	0
9	MF	(Germany) GER	Ahmet Engin	31	4	28	4	1	0	2	0
10	MF	(Germany) GER	Moritz Stoppelkamp	34	14	32	10	0	0	2	4
13	FW	(Germany) GER	Julian Hettwer	9	1	9	1	0	0	0	0
14	DF	(Bulgaria) BUL	Stefan Velkov	4	0	3	0	0	0	1	0
15	DF	(Germany) GER	Tobias Fleckstein	28	1	25	1	1	0	2	0
17	DF	(Germany) GER	Arne Sicker	34	2	33	2	1	0	0	0
19	FW	(Germany) GER	Sinan Karweina	20	1	18	1	1	0	1	0
20	FW	(Germany) GER	Leroy-Jacques Mickels	19	1	17	1	0	0	2	0
21	DF	(Germany) GER	Maximilian Jansen	19	0	17	0	1	0	1	0
22	GK	(Germany) GER	Jonas Brendieck	0	0	0	0	0	0	0	0
23	DF	(Germany) GER	Joshua Bitter	21	0	20	0	0	0	1	0
24	FW	(Netherlands) NED	Vincent Vermeij	25	8	23	8	1	0	1	0
26	DF	(Germany) GER	Vincent Gembalies	24	0	23	0	1	0	0	0
27	DF	(Germany) GER	Niko Bretschneider	7	0	6	0	1	0	0	0
28	MF	(Germany) GER	David Tomić	19	3	17	2	0	0	2	1
29	FW	(Switzerland) SUI	Orhan Ademi	26	3	23	2	1	0	2	1
30	GK	(Switzerland) SUI	Steven Deana	2	0	0	0	0	0	2	0
31	FW	(Germany) GER	Federico Palacios Martínez	13	3	11	3	0	0	2	0
35	FW	(Germany) GER	Cem Sabanci	0	0	0	0	0	0	0	0
36	MF	(Democratic Republic of the Congo) COD	Wilson Kamavuaka	28	3	26	3	1	0	1	0
37	MF	(Germany) GER	Marlon Frey	21	0	19	0	0	0	2	0
39	FW	(Morocco) MAR	Aziz Bouhaddouz	17	5	16	5	0	0	1	0
	MF	(Germany) GER	Arnold Budimbu‡	8	1	8	1	0	0	0	0

Last updated: 22 May 2021
Source: Soccerway

- ^{‡} Player left the club mid-season

=== Goals ===
As of 22 May 2021

Rank	Player	3. Liga	DFB-Pokal	LR Cup	Total
1	(Germany) Moritz Stoppelkamp	10	0	4	14
2	(Netherlands) Vincent Vermeij	8	0	0	8
3	(Morocco) Aziz Bouhaddouz	5	0	0	5
4	(Germany) Ahmet Engin	4	0	0	5
5	(Germany) Orhan Ademi	2	0	1	3
5	(Germany) Federico Palacios Martínez	3	0	0	3
5	(Democratic Republic of the Congo) Wilson Kamavuaka	3	0	0	3
5	(Germany) David Tomić	2	0	1	3
9	(Germany) Lukas Scepanik	2	0	0	2
9	(Germany) Arne Sicker	2	0	0	2
11	(Germany) Arnold Budimbu	1	0	0	1
11	(Germany) Tobias Fleckstein	1	0	0	1
11	(Romania) Darius Ghindovean	1	0	0	1
11	(Germany) Julian Hettwer	1	0	0	1
11	(Germany) Sinan Karweina	1	0	0	1
11	(Germany) Connor Krempicki	1	0	0	1
11	(Germany) Leroy-Jacques Mickels	1	0	0	1
11	(Germany) Maximilian Sauer	1	0	0	1
11	(Germany) Dominik Schmidt	1	0	0	1
Own goals		2	0	1	3
Total		51	0	7	58

=== Clean sheets ===
As of 22 May 2021

Rank	Player	3. Liga	DFB-Pokal	LR Cup	Total
1	(Germany) Leo Weinkauf	6	0	0	6
2	(Switzerland) Steven Deana	0	0	1	1
Total		6	0	1	7

=== Disciplinary record ===
N	P	Nat.	Name	3. Liga			DFB-Pokal			LR Cup			Total			Notes
N	P	Nat.	Name	Yellow card	Second yellow card	Red card	Yellow card	Second yellow card	Red card	Yellow card	Second yellow card	Red card	Yellow card	Second yellow card	Red card	Notes
17	DF	(Germany)	Arne Sicker	8		1							8		1	
4	DF	(Germany)	Dominic Volkmer	5					1				5		1	
3	DF	(Germany)	Dominik Schmidt	10	2								10	2		
36	MF	(Democratic Republic of the Congo)	Wilson Kamavuaka	11	1								11	1		
7	MF	(Germany)	Lukas Scepanik	1	1					1			2	1		
2	DF	(Germany)	Maximilian Sauer	10									10			
6	MF	(Germany)	Connor Krempicki	5									5			
8	MF	(Romania)	Darius Ghindovean	4									4			
10	MF	(Germany)	Moritz Stoppelkamp	4									4			
19	FW	(Germany)	Sinan Karweina	3			1						4			
21	MF	(Germany)	Maximilian Jansen	4									4			
26	DF	(Netherlands)	Vincent Gembalies	4									4			
37	MF	(Germany)	Marlon Frey	4									4			
15	DF	(Germany)	Tobias Fleckstein	3									3			
39	FW	(Morocco)	Aziz Bouhaddouz	3									3			
9	MF	(Germany)	Ahmet Engin	2									2			
23	DF	(Germany)	Joshua Bitter	2									2			
24	FW	(Netherlands)	Vincent Vermeij	2									2			
28	MF	(Germany)	David Tomić	1						1			2			
29	FW	(Germany)	Orhan Ademi	2									2			
14	DF	(Bulgaria)	Stefan Velkov							1			1			
20	FW	(Germany)	Leroy-Jacques Mickels							1			1			
27	DF	(Germany)	Niko Bretschneider	1									1			
31	FW	(Germany)	Federico Palacios Martínez	1									1			

Last updated: 22 May 2021
Source: Soccerway
Only competitive matches
(yellow card) = Number of bookings; (second yellow card) = Number of sending offs after a second yellow card; (red card) = Number of sending offs by a direct red card.
