= Schmeling =

Schmeling is a German surname. Notable people with the surname include:

- Gertrud Schmeling (1749–1833), German soprano
- Karsten Schmeling (born 1962), German rower
- Max Schmeling (1905–2005), German boxer
- Migel Schmeling (born 2000), German footballer
