= David Tomić =

German footballer

Personal information
- Date of birth: 9 February 1998 (age 28)
- Place of birth: Hanau, Germany
- Height: 1.74 m (5 ft 9 in)
- Position: Midfielder

Team information
- Current team: Heracles Almelo
- Number: 6

Youth career
- VfB Großauheim
- 2013–2017: 1. FC Kaiserslautern

Senior career*
| Years | Team | Apps | (Gls) |
| 2017–2018 | 1. FC Kaiserslautern II | 25 | (14) |
| 2018–2020 | VfB Stuttgart II | 48 | (19) |
| 2020–2021 | MSV Duisburg | 17 | (2) |
| 2021–2022 | Sonnenhof Großaspach | 30 | (3) |
| 2022–2023 | SGV Freiberg | 26 | (4) |
| 2024–2026 | Stuttgarter Kickers | 64 | (22) |
| 2026– | Heracles Almelo | 6 | (0) |

International career^{‡}
| 2017 | Germany U19 | 1 | (0) |
| 2017 | Germany U20 | 1 | (0) |
- * Club domestic league appearances and goals as of 2 October 2026 ‡ National team caps and goals as of 9 October 2017

David Tomić (born 9 February 1998) is a German footballer who plays as a midfielder for Eerste Divisie club Heracles Almelo in the Netherlands.

== Career ==
In the summer of 2020, Tomić moved to MSV Duisburg. He made his professional debut for MSV Duisburg in the 3. Liga on 19 September 2020, in the away match against Hansa Rostock. He left Duisburg at the end of the 2020–21 season. In September 2021, he joined Sonnenhof Großaspach.

== Career statistics ==
As of 22 May 2021

| Club | Season | Division | League | | Cup | | Continental | | Total | |
| Club | Season | Division | Apps | Goals | Apps | Goals | Apps | Goals | Apps | Goals |
|---|---|---|---|---|---|---|---|---|---|---|
| 1. FC Kaiserslautern II | 2017–18 | Oberliga Rheinland-Pfalz/Saar | 25 | 14 | — | | — | | 25 | 14 |
| VfB Stuttgart II | 2018–19 | Regionalliga Südwest | 32 | 7 | — | | — | | 32 | 7 |
| VfB Stuttgart II | 2019–20 | Oberliga Baden-Württemberg | 16 | 12 | — | | — | | 16 | 12 |
| VfB Stuttgart II | Total | | 48 | 19 | — | | — | | 48 | 19 |
| MSV Duisburg | 2020–21 | 3. Liga | 17 | 2 | — | | — | | 17 | 2 |
| Career total | | | 90 | 35 | — | | — | | 90 | 35 |
