= Darius Ghindovean =

Romanian footballer (born 2001)

Personal information
- Full name: Darius Dacian Ghindovean
- Date of birth: 1 November 2001 (age 25)
- Place of birth: Mediaș, Romania
- Height: 1.84 m (6 ft 0 in)
- Position: Midfielder

Team information
- Current team: Concordia Chiajna (on loan from Voluntari)
- Number: 33

Youth career
- –2014: CFR Cluj
- 2014–2016: Viitorul Cluj
- 2016–2017: SC Kapellen-Erft
- 2017–2020: MSV Duisburg

Senior career*
Years	Team	Apps	(Gls)
2020–2022	MSV Duisburg	29	(1)
2022–2024	Preußen Münster	35	(5)
2024–2025	FC U Craiova	18	(2)
2025–2026	Politehnica Iași	18	(4)
2026–	Voluntari	1	(0)
2026–	→ Concordia Chiajna (loan)	5	(2)

International career
2018	Romania U17	2	(0)
2019	Romania U18	1	(0)
2019	Romania U19	6	(1)
2021	Romania U20	4	(1)
- * Club domestic league appearances and goals as of 1 November 2026

Darius Dacian Ghindovean (born 1 November 2001) is a Romanian professional footballer who plays as a midfielder for Liga II club Concordia Chiajna, on loan from Liga I club Voluntari.

== Career ==
He made his professional debut for MSV Duisburg in the 3. Liga on 20 June 2020, in the home match against Hansa Rostock. On 7 July 2020, he signed a one-year contract extension. The option for another year was used on 4 June 2021. In January 2022, he moved to Preußen Münster.

On 16 June 2024, Ghindovean returned to his native country to sign with FCU Craiova.

== Career statistics ==
As of 1 November 2026

Appearances and goals by club, season and competition
Club	Season	League			National cup (Note: Includes DFB-Pokal, Niederrheinpokal, Westfalenpokal, Cupa României)		Other		Total	
Club	Season	Division	Apps	Goals	Apps	Goals	Apps	Goals	Apps	Goals
MSV Duisburg	2019–20	3. Liga	3	0	0	0	—		3	0
MSV Duisburg	2020–21	3. Liga	15	1	1	0	—		16	1
MSV Duisburg	2021–22	3. Liga	11	0	3	1	—		14	1
MSV Duisburg	Total		29	1	4	1	—		33	2
Preußen Münster	2021–22	Regionalliga West	13	4	2	0	—		15	4
Preußen Münster	2022–23	Regionalliga West	14	1	3	3	—		17	4
Preußen Münster	2023–24	3. Liga	8	0	4	4	—		12	4
Preußen Münster	Total		35	5	9	7	—		44	12
FC U Craiova	2024–25	Liga II	18	2	1	0	—		19	2
Politehnica Iași	2025–26	Liga II	18	4	1	0	—		19	4
Voluntari	2026–27	Liga I	1	0	0	0	—		1	0
Concordia Chiajna (loan)	2026–27	Liga II	5	2	1	0	—		6	2
Career total			106	14	16	8	—		122	22

== Honours ==
Preußen Münster

- Regionalliga West: 2022–23
- Westphalia Cup runner-up: 2021–22
