= Leroy-Jacques Mickels =

Rwandan footballer (born 1995)

Personal information
- Date of birth: 25 June 1995 (age 31)
- Place of birth: Siegburg, Germany
- Height: 1.77 m (5 ft 10 in)
- Position: Forward

Team information
- Current team: Waldhof Mannheim
- Number: 23

Youth career
- 2011–2014: Borussia Mönchengladbach

Senior career*
Years	Team	Apps	(Gls)
2014–2015	Borussia Mönchengladbach II	7	(1)
2016	FC St. Pauli II	7	(1)
2017	Alemannia Aachen	1	(0)
2017–2018	1. FC Monheim	20	(10)
2018–2019	SSVg Velbert	26	(19)
2019–2021	MSV Duisburg	53	(6)
2021–2022	Türkgücü München	11	(0)
2022–2023	Rot-Weiß Oberhausen	19	(2)
2023	Spartak Varna	17	(1)
2023–2024	Al-Taraji	25	(2)
2024–2025	Shamakhi	23	(5)
2025–2026	Zira	26	(3)
2026–	Waldhof Mannheim	0	(0)

International career^{‡}
2026–	Rwanda	3	(3)
Medal record
Representing Rwanda
Men's football
FIFA Series
Winner	2026 Rwanda
- * Club domestic league appearances and goals as of 22 June 2026 ‡ National team caps and goals as of 25 September 2026

Leroy-Jacques Mickels (born 25 June 1995) is a professional footballer who plays as a forward for 3. Liga club Waldhof Mannheim. Born in Germany, he represents the Rwanda national team.

== Club career ==
Mickels moved to MSV Duisburg on 27 June 2019. He made his professional debut for MSV Duisburg in the 3. Liga on 20 July 2019, in the home match against Sonnenhof Großaspach. His contract was extended until 2021 on 18 December 2019. On 26 May 2021, it was announced that he would leave Duisburg at the end of the 2020–21 season. Four days later, he signed with Türkgücü München.

Mickels joined Regionalliga West club Rot-Weiß Oberhausen on 23 June 2022. He signed a one-and-a-half-year contract with Bulgarian club Spartak Varna in January 2023.

On 4 July 2023, Mickels joined Saudi club Al-Taraji.

On 14 August 2024, Mickels joined Azerbaijani club Shamakhi. On 11 August 2025, fellow Azerbaijan Premier League club Zira announced the signing of Mickels from Şamaxı, on a two-year contract.

On 22 July 2026, Mickels returned to Germany after four seasons abroad and signed with Waldhof Mannheim in 3. Liga.

== International career ==
On 16 March 2026, Mickels was named in Rwanda's provisional 31-man squad for their 2026 FIFA Series matches against Grenada and then either Kenya or Estonia, alongside his older twin-brothers Joy-Lance and Joy-Slayd.

== Personal life ==
Leroy-Jacques' older twin brothers Joy-Lance and Joy-Slayd Mickels are also professional footballer. The three brothers, whose mother come from the DR Congo and father from Rwanda, played together at the under-19 level for Borussia Mönchengladbach.

== Career statistics ==
=== Club ===
As of match played 18 September 2022

Appearances and goals by club, season and competition
Club	Season	League			Cup		Continental		Total	
Club	Season	Division	Apps	Goals	Apps	Goals	Apps	Goals	Apps	Goals
Borussia Mönchengladbach II	2014–15	Regionalliga	7	1	—		—		7	1
FC St. Pauli II	2015–16	Regionalliga	7	1	—		—		7	1
Alemannia Aachen	2016–17	Regionalliga	1	0	—		—		1	0
1. FC Monheim	2017–18	Oberliga	20	10	—		—		20	10
SSVg Velbert	2018–19	Oberliga	26	19	—		—		26	19
MSV Duisburg	2019–20	3. Liga	37	5	2	0	—		39	5
MSV Duisburg	2020–21	3. Liga	16	1	0	0	—		16	1
MSV Duisburg	Total		53	6	2	0	0	0	55	6
Türkgücü München	2021–22	3. Liga	11	0	0	0	—		11	0
Rot-Weiß Oberhausen	2022–23	Regionalliga	9	1	0	0	—		9	1
Career total			134	38	0	0	0	0	136	38

=== International ===
Scores and results list Rwanda's goal tally first.

No.	Date	Venue	Opponent	Score	Result	Competition
1.	27 March 2026	Amahoro Stadium, Kigali, Rwanda	Grenada	1–0	4–0	2026 FIFA Series
2.	30 March 2026	Amahoro Stadium, Kigali, Rwanda	Estonia	2–0	2–0	2026 FIFA Series
3.	25 September 2026	Amahoro Stadium, Kigali, Rwanda	Liberia	2–0	3–1	2027 Africa Cup of Nations qualification

== Honours ==
Rwanda

- FIFA Series: 2026

Individual

- FIFA Series Player of the Tournament: 2026
