= Moritz Stoppelkamp =

German footballer

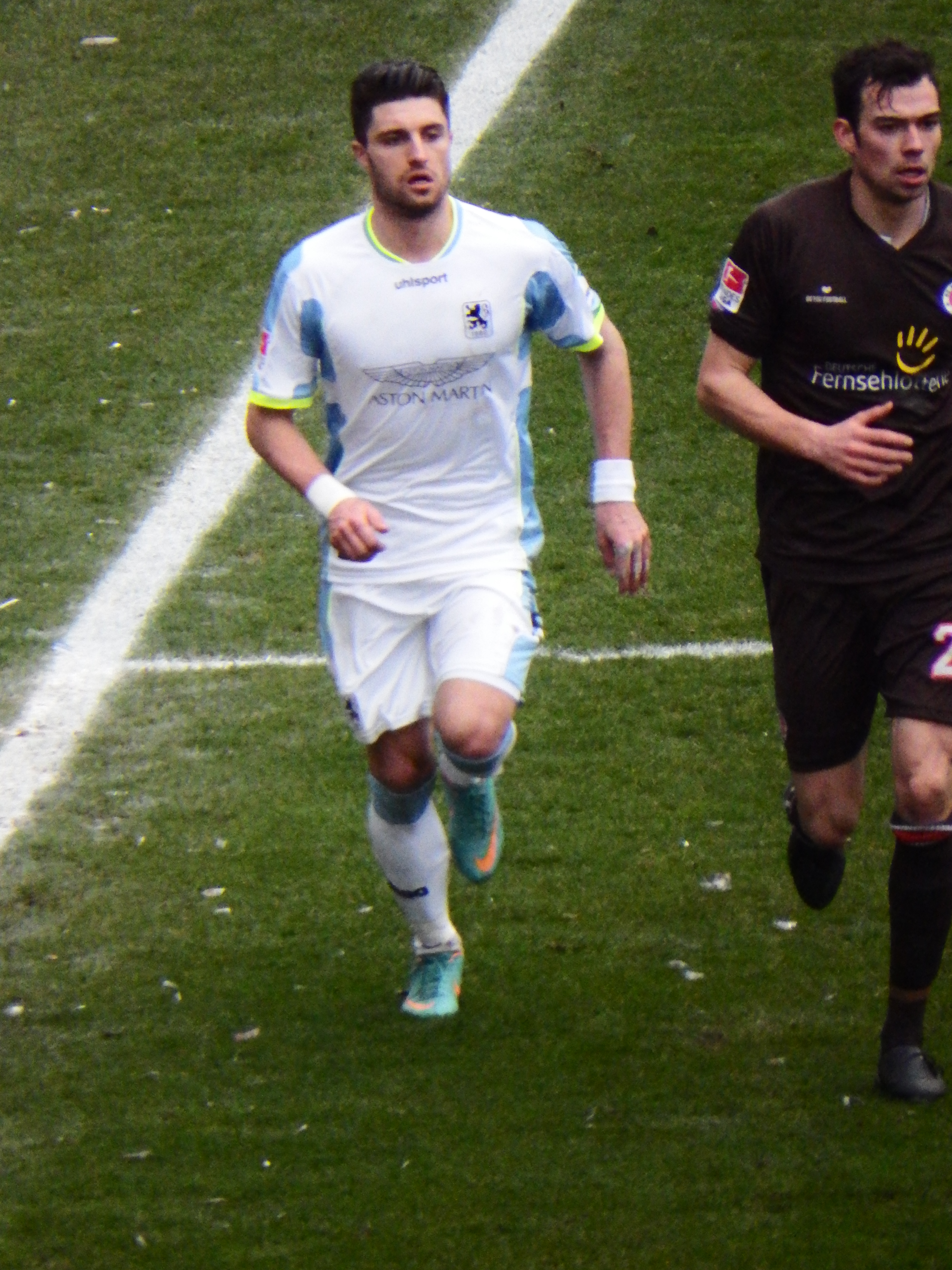
- Stoppelkamp (left) playing for 1860 Munich in 2013

Personal information
- Date of birth: 11 December 1986 (age 39)
- Place of birth: Duisburg, West Germany
- Height: 1.80 m (5 ft 11 in)
- Position: Midfielder

Youth career
- Viktoria Buchholz
- –2002: MSV Duisburg
- 2002–2004: Fortuna Düsseldorf
- 2004–2005: Rot-Weiss Essen

Senior career*
Years	Team	Apps	(Gls)
2005–2007	Rot-Weiss Essen	26	(2)
2006–2007	→ Rot-Weiß Erfurt (loan)	21	(0)
2006–2007	→ Rot-Weiß Erfurt II (loan)	4	(1)
2008–2010	Rot-Weiß Oberhausen	46	(9)
2010–2012	Hannover 96	44	(0)
2012–2014	1860 Munich	67	(12)
2014–2016	SC Paderborn	56	(10)
2016–2017	Karlsruher SC	23	(4)
2017–2023	MSV Duisburg	182	(54)
2023–2026	Rot-Weiß Oberhausen	74	(32)
Total		543	(124)

International career
2006–2007	Germany U20	4	(0)
- * Club domestic league appearances and goals

Moritz Stoppelkamp (born 11 December 1986) is a German former professional footballer who played as a midfielder.

== Club career ==
Stoppelkamp played for Rot-Weiss Essen from July 2005 to August 2006. He made 15 appearances during the 2005–06 season. He was loaned to Rot-Weiß Erfurt for the 2006–07 season. During the 2006–07 season, he made 21 appearances for the first team and scored a goal in four appearances for the reserve team. Stoppelkamp returned to Rot-Weiss Essen for the 2007–08 season. During the 2007–08 season, he scored two goals in 11 appearances.

Stoppelkamp made his debut on the professional league level in the 2. Bundesliga for Rot-Weiß Oberhausen on 17 August 2008, when he started in a game against TuS Koblenz. He finished the 2008–09 season with 16 appearances. During the 2009–10 season, he scored nine goals in 33 appearances.

Stoppelkamp joined Hannover 96 for the following two season. During the 2010–11 season, he made 24 appearances. During the 2011–12 season, he made 28 appearances.

He joined 1860 Munich for the 2012–13 and 2013–14 seasons. During the 2012–13 season, he scored nine goals in 36 appearances. During the 2013–14 season, he scored seven goals in 36 appearances.

Having joined SC Paderborn Stoppelkamp was a regular starter for the team on the right side of the midfield. On 20 September 2014, he scored a goal from 83 metres in a 2–0 victory against former club Hannover, a record in Bundesliga history. He finished the 2014–15 season with four goals in 28 appearances. During the 2015–16 season, he scored six goals in 31 appearances.

During the 2016–17 season, Stoppelkamp played for Karlsruher SC, where he scored four goals in 24 appearances.

On 3 July 2017, he returned to his youth club MSV Duisburg signing a two-year contract including the option for a third. He finished his first season with nine goals in 33 appearances. He extended his contract on 11 June 2019. A new one-year deal was signed in May 2022, keeping him at the club until 2023. In May 2023, it was announced that he would leave Duisburg after the 2022–23 season.

On 11 July 2023, Stoppelkamp returned to Rot-Weiß Oberhausen. On 20 January 2025, he extended his contract with Rot-Weiß Oberhausen until 30 June 2026.

Stoppelkamp retired at the end of the 2025–26 season.

== International career ==
Stoppelkamp represented the Germany U20 national team four times.

== Career statistics ==
Appearances and goals by club, season and competition
Club	Season	League			DFB-Pokal		Other		Total		Ref.
Club	Season	Division	Apps	Goals	Apps	Goals	Apps	Goals	Apps	Goals	Ref.
Rot-Weiss Essen	2005–06	Regionalliga Nord	15	0	—		—		15	0	
Rot-Weiss Essen	2007–08	Regionalliga Nord	11	2	1	0	—		12	2	
Rot-Weiss Essen	Total		26	2	1	0	0	0	27	2	—
Rot-Weiß Erfurt (loan)	2006–07	Regionalliga Nord	21	0	—		—		21	0	
Rot-Weiß Erfurt II (loan)	2006–07	NOFV-Oberliga Süd	4	1	—		—		4	1	
Rot-Weiß Oberhausen	2008–09	2. Bundesliga	15	0	1	0	—		16	0	
Rot-Weiß Oberhausen	2009–10	2. Bundesliga	31	9	2	0	—		33	9	
Rot-Weiß Oberhausen	Total		46	9	3	0	0	0	49	9	—
Hannover 96	2010–11	Bundesliga	23	0	1	0	—		24	0	
Hannover 96	2011–12	Bundesliga	21	0	2	2	5 (Note: Appearances in the Europa League)	0	28	2	
Hannover 96	Total		44	0	3	2	5	0	52	2	—
1860 Munich	2012–13	2. Bundesliga	33	6	3	3	—		36	9	
1860 Munich	2013–14	2. Bundesliga	34	6	2	1	—		36	7	
1860 Munich	Total		67	12	5	4	0	0	72	16	—
SC Paderborn	2014–15	Bundesliga	27	4	1	0	—		28	4	
SC Paderborn	2015–16	2. Bundesliga	29	6	2	0	—		31	6	
SC Paderborn	Total		56	10	3	0	0	0	59	10	—
Karlsruher SC	2016–17	2. Bundesliga	23	4	1	0	—		24	4	
MSV Duisburg	2017–18	2. Bundesliga	32	9	1	0	—		33	9	
MSV Duisburg	2018–19	2. Bundesliga	26	3	3	0	—		29	3	
MSV Duisburg	2019–20	3. Liga	33	15	2	0	1 (Note: Appearance in the Lower Rhine Cup)	4	36	19	
MSV Duisburg	2020–21	3. Liga	32	10	0	0	—		32	10	
MSV Duisburg	2021–22	3. Liga	31	10	—		—		31	10	
MSV Duisburg	2022–23	3. Liga	28	7	—		—		27	7	
MSV Duisburg	Total		182	54	6	0	1	4	189	58	—
Rot-Weiß Oberhausen	2023–24	Regionalliga West	34	15	0	0	—		34	15	
Rot-Weiß Oberhausen	2024–25	Regionalliga West	21	12	—		1	1	22	13	
Rot-Weiß Oberhausen	2025–26	Regionalliga West	19	5	—		—		19	5	
Rot-Weiß Oberhausen	Total		74	32	0	0	1	1	75	33	—
Career total			543	124	22	6	7	5	572	135	—
