= Mirnes Pepić =

Montenegrin footballer (born 1995)

Personal information
- Date of birth: 19 December 1995 (age 30)
- Place of birth: Podgorica, Yugoslavia
- Height: 1.77 m (5 ft 10 in)
- Position: Attacking midfielder

Team information
- Current team: KSV Hessen Kassel
- Number: 20

Youth career
- 2012–2013: SSV Reutlingen

Senior career*
Years	Team	Apps	(Gls)
2013–2014	SSV Reutlingen	12	(0)
2014–2016	SC Paderborn	11	(0)
2016–2018	Erzgebirge Aue	8	(0)
2018–2020	Hansa Rostock	65	(1)
2020–2021	MSV Duisburg	7	(0)
2021–2022	Würzburger Kickers	21	(1)
2022–2023	SV Meppen	22	(1)
2023–2025	Erzgebirge Aue	70	(5)
2025–2026	SSV Ulm	22	(1)
2026–	KSV Hessen Kassel	6	(1)

International career
2013	Montenegro U18	1	(0)
2013–2015	Montenegro U19	5	(0)
2015–2016	Montenegro U21	7	(0)
- * Club domestic league appearances and goals as of 24 September 2026

Mirnes Pepić (Albanian: Mirnes Pepaj; born 19 December 1995) is a Montenegrin professional footballer who plays as an attacking midfielder for German KSV Hessen Kassel.

== Club career ==
After several years in the 2. Bundesliga and 3. Liga, he moved to MSV Duisburg in the summer of 2020. On 26 May 2021, it was announced that he would leave Duisburg at the end of the 2020–21 season. In August 2021, he signed for the Würzburger Kickers.

Pepić joined 3. Liga club SV Meppen following Würzburger Kickers' relegation to the Regionalliga Bayern in the 2021–22 season. He signed a one-year contract on 1 August 2022.

On 6 June 2023, Pepić returned to Erzgebirge Aue on a two-year deal.

== International career ==
Pepić has played for U18, U19 and U21 youth teams of Montenegro. In 2015, he made his debut for Montenegro U21.

== Career statistics ==
As of match played 12 September 2022

Appearances and goals by club, season and competition
Club	Season	League			DFB-Pokal		Other		Total	
Club	Season	Division	Apps	Goals	Apps	Goals	Apps	Goals	Apps	Goals
Paderborn 07	2013–14	2. Bundesliga	1	0	0	0	—		1	0
Paderborn 07	2014–15	Bundesliga	2	0	0	0	—		2	0
Paderborn 07	2015–16	2. Bundesliga	8	0	0	0	—		8	0
Paderborn 07	Total		11	0	0	0	0	0	11	0
Erzgebirge Aue	2016–17	2. Bundesliga	8	0	1	0	—		9	0
Erzgebirge Aue	2017–18	2. Bundesliga	0	0	0	0	—		0	0
Erzgebirge Aue	Total		8	0	1	0	0	0	9	0
Hansa Rostock	2018–19	3. Liga	34	1	2	1	4 (Note: Appearances in the Mecklenburg-Vorpommern Cup)	1	40	3
Hansa Rostock	2019–20	3. Liga	32	0	1	0	1	0	34	0
Hansa Rostock	Total		66	1	3	1	5	1	74	3
MSV Duisburg	2020–21	3. Liga	7	0	0	0	—		7	0
Würzburger Kickers	2021–22	3. Liga	21	1	0	0	2 (Note: Appearances in the Bavarian Cup)	0	23	1
SV Meppen	2022–23	3. Liga	7	0	0	0	0	0	7	0
Career total			120	2	4	1	7	1	131	4
