= Arne Sicker =

German footballer

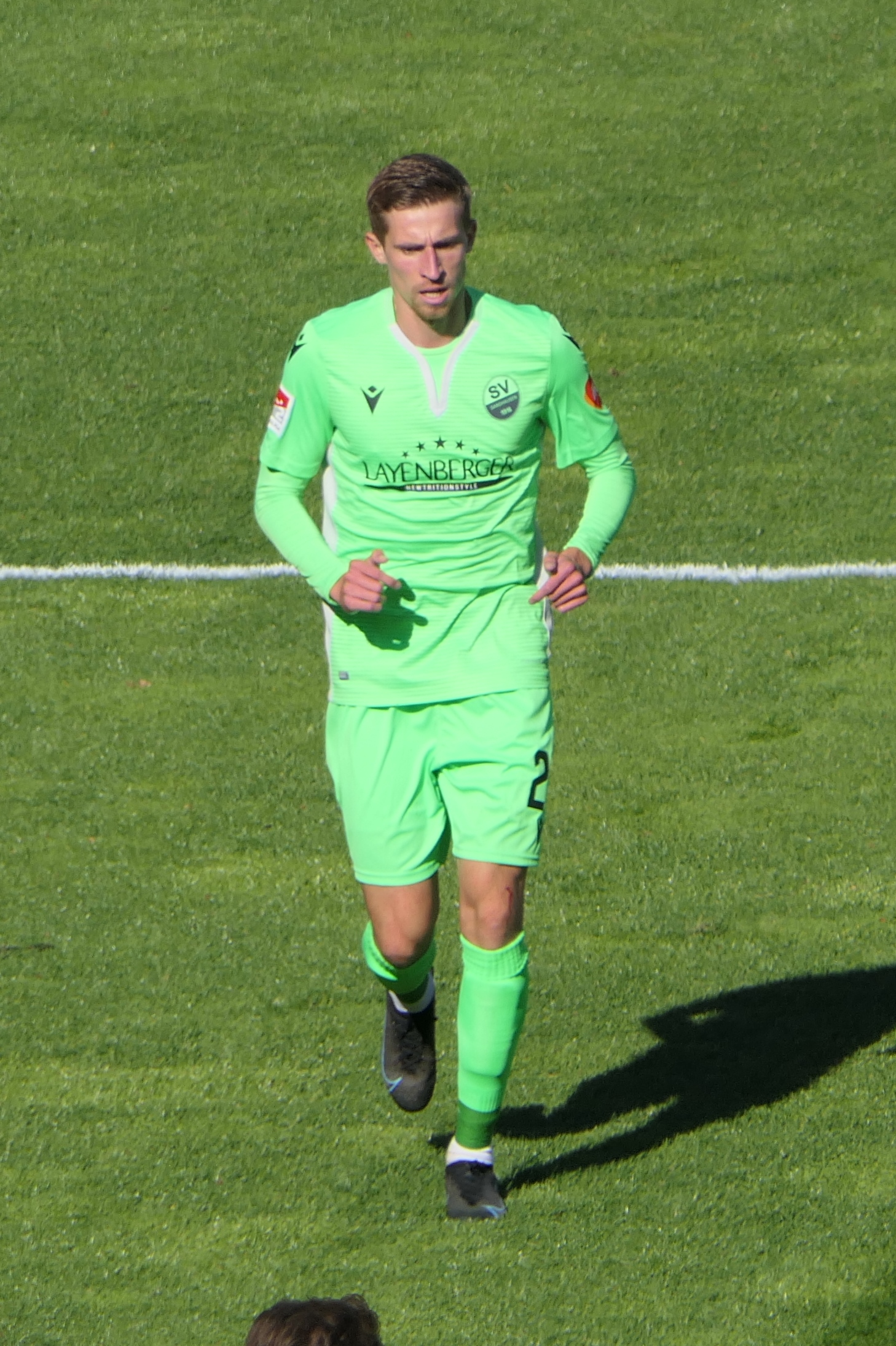
- SV Sandhausen 2021

Personal information
- Date of birth: 17 April 1997 (age 29)
- Place of birth: Eckernförde, Germany
- Height: 1.84 m (6 ft 0 in)
- Position: Left-back

Team information
- Current team: Arminia Bielefeld
- Number: 17

Youth career
- 2002–2008: Barkelsbyer SV
- 2008–2009: FT Eider Büdelsdorf
- 2009–2016: Holstein Kiel

Senior career*
Years	Team	Apps	(Gls)
2016–2019	Holstein Kiel	23	(0)
2016–2019	Holstein Kiel II	18	(0)
2019–2021	MSV Duisburg	63	(2)
2021–2023	SV Sandhausen	31	(1)
2023–2025	SV Elversberg	16	(0)
2025–	Arminia Bielefeld	17	(0)
- * Club domestic league appearances and goals as of 18 May 2026

Arne Sicker (born 17 April 1997) is a German professional footballer who plays as a defender for 2. Bundesliga club Arminia Bielefeld.

== Career ==
In the summer of 2019, Sicker was signed by MSV Duisburg. After two years, he moved to SV Sandhausen in the summer of 2021.

In June 2023, Sicker signed for newly promoted 2. Bundesliga club SV Elversberg ahead of the club's first ever season in the second tier of German football.

On 29 August 2025, Sicker joined Arminia Bielefeld in 2. Bundesliga as a free agent.

== Career statistics ==
As of end of 2022–23 season

Appearances and goals by club, season and competition
Club	Season	Division	League		Cup		Continental		Total	
Club	Season	Division	Apps	Goals	Apps	Goals	Apps	Goals	Apps	Goals
Holstein Kiel	2015–16	3. Liga	3	0	—		—		3	0
Holstein Kiel	2016–17	3. Liga	16	0	—		—		16	0
Holstein Kiel	2017–18	2. Bundesliga	1	0	—		—		1	0
Holstein Kiel	2018–19	2. Bundesliga	3	0	—		—		3	0
Holstein Kiel	Total		23	0	—		—		23	0
Holstein Kiel II	2018–19	Regionalliga	18	0	—		—		18	0
MSV Duisburg	2019–20	3. Liga	30	0	2	0	—		32	0
MSV Duisburg	2020–21	3. Liga	33	2	1	0	—		34	2
MSV Duisburg	Total		63	2	3	0	—		66	2
SV Sandhausen	2021–22	2. Bundesliga	17	1	1	0	—		18	1
SV Sandhausen	2022–23	2. Bundesliga	14	0	0	0	—		14	0
SV Sandhausen	Total		31	1	1	0	—		32	1
Career total			135	3	4	0	—		139	3
