= Leo Weinkauf =

German footballer

Personal information
- Date of birth: 7 July 1996 (age 30)
- Place of birth: Oldenburg, Germany
- Height: 1.96 m (6 ft 5 in)
- Position: Goalkeeper

Team information
- Current team: Hannover 96
- Number: 30

Youth career
- 2002–2006: VfL Oldenburg
- 2006–2015: Werder Bremen

Senior career*
Years	Team	Apps	(Gls)
2015–2018	Bayern Munich II	43	(0)
2018–	Hannover 96 II	36	(0)
2018–	Hannover 96	0	(0)
2019–2022	→ MSV Duisburg (loan)	111	(0)
- * Club domestic league appearances and goals as of 24 May 2025

Leo Weinkauf (born 7 July 1996) is a German professional footballer who plays as a goalkeeper for 2. Bundesliga club Hannover 96.

== Career ==
Weinkauf moved to MSV Duisburg on 18 June 2019, on loan from Hannover 96. He made his professional debut in the 3. Liga on 20 July 2019, starting in the home match against Sonnenhof Großaspach. After the 2020–21 season, he was loaned to Duisburg for another year.

== Career statistics ==
As of match played 8 April 2025

Appearances and goals by club, season and competition
Club	Season	Division	League		Cup		Other		Total	
Club	Season	Division	Apps	Goals	Apps	Goals	Apps	Goals	Apps	Goals
Bayern Munich II	2015–16	Regionalliga	7	0	—		—		7	0
Bayern Munich II	2016–17	Regionalliga	20	0	—		—		20	0
Bayern Munich II	2017–18	Regionalliga	16	0	—		—		16	0
Bayern Munich II	Total		43	0	—		—		43	0
Bayern Munich	2016–17	Bundesliga	0	0	0	0	—		0	0
Bayern Munich	2017–18	Bundesliga	0	0	0	0	—		0	0
Bayern Munich	Total		0	0	0	0	—		0	0
Hannover 96 II	2018–19	Regionalliga	28	0	—		—		28	0
Hannover 96 II	2022–23	Regionalliga	1	0	—		—		1	0
Hannover 96 II	2023–24	Regionalliga	5	0	—		—		5	0
Hannover 96 II	2024–25	3. Liga	2	0	—		—		2	0
Hannover 96 II	Total		36	0	—		—		36	0
Hannover 96	2018–19	Bundesliga	0	0	0	0	—		0	0
Hannover 96	2022–23	2. Bundesliga	0	0	2	0	—		2	0
Hannover 96	2023–24	2. Bundesliga	0	0	1	0	—		1	0
Hannover 96	2024–25	2. Bundesliga	0	0	1	0	—		1	0
Hannover 96	2025–26	2. Bundesliga	0	0	0	0	—		0	0
Hannover 96	Total		0	0	4	0	—		4	0
MSV Duisburg (loan)	2019–20	3. Liga	38	0	2	0	—		40	0
MSV Duisburg (loan)	2020–21	3. Liga	38	0	1	0	—		39	0
MSV Duisburg (loan)	2021–22	3. Liga	35	0	—		—		35	0
MSV Duisburg (loan)	Total		111	0	3	0	—		113	0
Career total			190	0	7	0	—		197	0
