= Lukas Scepanik =

German footballer (born 1994)

Personal information
- Date of birth: 11 April 1994 (age 32)
- Place of birth: Cologne, Germany
- Height: 1.76 m (5 ft 9 in)
- Position: Midfielder

Team information
- Current team: Alemannia Aachen
- Number: 8

Youth career
- –2013: 1. FC Köln

Senior career*
Years	Team	Apps	(Gls)
2013–2016	1. FC Köln II	64	(2)
2016–2017	Stuttgarter Kickers II	2	(0)
2016–2018	Stuttgarter Kickers	54	(5)
2018–2019	Rot-Weiss Essen	31	(4)
2019–2021	MSV Duisburg	48	(5)
2021–2022	Türkgücü München	18	(0)
2022–2023	1. FC Kaan-Marienborn	25	(3)
2023–	Alemannia Aachen	76	(14)
- * Club domestic league appearances and goals as of 28 May 2026

Lukas Scepanik (born 11 April 1994) is a German professional footballer who plays as a midfielder for 3. Liga club Alemannia Aachen.

== Career ==
Scepanik moved to MSV Duisburg on 1 June 2019. He made his professional debut for MSV Duisburg in the 3. Liga on 18 October 2019, in the home match against 1. FC Kaiserslautern. On 26 May 2021, it was announced that he would leave Duisburg at the end of the 2020–21 season. He moved to Türkgücü München on 7 October 2021.

On 20 July 2022, Scepanik signed with Regionalliga West club 1. FC Kaan-Marienborn, after his former club Türkgücü München had been relegated after filing for insolvency.

On 23 May 2023, Alemannia Aachen announced the signing of Scepanik.

== Career statistics ==
As of match played 13 September 2022

Appearances and goals by club, season and competition
Club	Season	Division	League		Cup		Other		Total	
Club	Season	Division	Apps	Goals	Apps	Goals	Apps	Goals	Apps	Goals
1. FC Köln II	2013–14	Regionalliga	20	2	—		—		20	2
1. FC Köln II	2014–15	Regionalliga	11	0	—		—		11	0
1. FC Köln II	2015–16	Regionalliga	33	0	—		—		33	0
1. FC Köln II	Total		64	2	—		—		64	2
Stuttgart Kickers	2016–17	Regionalliga	25	2	—		5 (Note: Appearances in the Württemberg Cup)	0	30	2
Stuttgart Kickers	2017–18	Regionalliga	29	3	—		1	1	30	4
Stuttgart Kickers	Total		54	5	—		6	1	60	6
Rot-Weiss Essen	2018–19	Regionalliga	31	4	—		5 (Note: Appearances in the Lower Rhine Cup)	0	36	4
MSV Duisburg	2019–20	3. Liga	24	3	1	0	1	0	26	3
MSV Duisburg	2020–21	3. Liga	24	2	1	0	2	0	27	2
MSV Duisburg	Total		48	5	2	0	3	0	53	5
Türkgücü München	2021–22	3. Liga	18	1	—		1 (Note: Appearances in the Bavarian Cup)	0	19	1
1. FC Kaan-Marienborn	2022–23	Regionalliga	6	0	1	0	1 (Note: Appearances in the Westphalian Cup)	0	8	0
Career total			221	17	3	0	16	1	240	18
