= Vincent Vermeij =

Dutch footballer

Personal information
- Date of birth: 9 August 1994 (age 32)
- Place of birth: Blaricum, Netherlands
- Height: 1.96 m (6 ft 5 in)
- Position: Forward

Team information
- Current team: Dynamo Dresden
- Number: 9

Youth career
- –2012: De Zuidvogels
- 2012–2013: Ajax

Senior career*
Years	Team	Apps	(Gls)
2013–2014	Ajax	0	(0)
2013–2014	Jong Ajax	17	(2)
2014–2016	De Graafschap	84	(34)
2016–2019	Heracles Almelo	46	(11)
2019	→ FC Den Bosch (loan)	17	(6)
2019–2021	MSV Duisburg	56	(22)
2021–2023	SC Freiburg II	64	(26)
2022–2023	SC Freiburg	1	(0)
2023–2025	Fortuna Düsseldorf	50	(13)
2025–	Dynamo Dresden	24	(11)

International career
2016	Netherlands U21	5	(1)
- * Club domestic league appearances and goals as of 18 May 2026

Vincent Vermeij (born 9 August 1994) is a Dutch professional footballer who plays as a forward for German 2. Bundesliga club Dynamo Dresden.

== Club career ==
=== Ajax ===
Vincent Vermeij was born and raised in Blaricum, where he joined the youth of HSV De Zuidvogels in nearby Huizen. He joined the youth ranks of Ajax in 2012, and signed his first professional contract with Ajax on 4 July 2013, a one-year contract running until 30 June 2014. At first instance Vermeij joined the newly promoted reserves team Jong Ajax, playing in the Dutch Eerste Divisie, the second tier of professional football in the Netherlands. He made his debut for Jong Ajax in the regular season away match against MVV Maastricht on 17 August 2013. The match ended in 1–0 loss for the Amsterdam side. He scored his first professional goal for Jong Ajax in his second appearance in a match against Jong Twente on 30 August 2013, scoring in the 38th minute of the 2–1 win at home.

=== De Graafschap ===
On 31 January 2014, it was announced that Vermeij had transferred to the club from Doetinchem for an undisclosed fee. He signed a 2.5-year contract with his new club having made 17 league appearances for the Ajax reserves squad, while scoring three goals. He scored his first goal for his new club on 7 February 2014 in an away match against FC Oss which ended in a 2–2 draw.

=== MSV Duisburg ===
In the summer of 2019, he moved to MSV Duisburg. He left Duisburg at the end of the 2020–21 season.

=== SC Freiburg II ===
He signed for SC Freiburg II for the 2021–22 season.

=== Fortuna Düsseldorf ===
On 13 June 2023, Vermeij signed for 2. Bundesliga club Fortuna Düsseldorf.

=== Dynamo Dresden ===
On 11 August 2025, Vermeij moved to Dynamo Dresden, also in 2. Bundesliga.

== Career statistics ==
As of match played 15 March 2024

Appearances and goals by club, season and competition
Club	Season	League			National cup (Note: Includes KNVB Cup, DFB-Pokal)		Other		Total	
Club	Season	Division	Apps	Goals	Apps	Goals	Apps	Goals	Apps	Goals
Jong Ajax	2013–14	Eerste Divisie	17	2	–		–		17	2
De Graafschap	2013–14	Eerste Divisie	13	7	0	0	4 (Note: Appearances in Eredivisie promotion/relegation play-offs)	2	17	9
De Graafschap	2014–15	Eerste Divisie	38	18	2	1	6	2	46	21
De Graafschap	2015–16	Eredivisie	33	9	1	0	3	0	37	9
De Graafschap	Total		84	34	3	1	13	4	100	39
Heracles Almelo	2016–17	Eredivisie	14	2	1	2	–		15	4
Heracles Almelo	2017–18	Eredivisie	24	8	3	1	–		27	9
Heracles Almelo	2018–19	Eredivisie	8	1	2	2	–		10	3
Heracles Almelo	Total		46	11	6	5	–		52	16
Den Bosch (loan)	2018–19	Eerste Divisie	17	6	–		2	0	19	6
MSV Duisburg	2019–20	3. Liga	33	14	1	0	0	0	34	14
MSV Duisburg	2020–21	3. Liga	23	8	1	0	—		24	8
MSV Duisburg	Total		56	22	2	0	—		58	22
SC Freiburg II	2021–22	3. Liga	28	11	—		—		28	11
SC Freiburg II	2022–23	3. Liga	36	15	—		—		36	15
SC Freiburg II	Total		64	26	—		—		64	26
SC Freiburg	2021–22	Bundesliga	1	0	0	0	—		1	0
Fortuna Düsseldorf	2023–24	2. Bundesliga	23	9	4	2	—		27	11
Career total			308	110	15	8	15	4	338	122
