= Arnold Budimbu =

German footballer

Personal information
- Date of birth: 20 February 1995 (age 31)
- Place of birth: Bochum, Germany
- Height: 1.78 m (5 ft 10 in)
- Position: Midfielder

Team information
- Current team: 1. FC Bocholt
- Number: 10

Youth career
- –2014: 1. FC Köln

Senior career*
Years	Team	Apps	(Gls)
2014–2016	1. FC Köln II	64	(3)
2016–2017	Rot-Weiß Oberhausen	49	(11)
2017–2018	Schalke 04 II	30	(8)
2018–2019	TSV Steinbach Haiger	30	(5)
2019–2021	MSV Duisburg	28	(1)
2021	TSV Steinbach Haiger	8	(1)
2021–2022	Phönix Lübeck	22	(2)
2022–2025	Fortuna Köln	90	(7)
2025–	1. FC Bocholt	35	(10)
- * Club domestic league appearances and goals as of 23 September 2026

Arnold Budimbu (born 20 February 1995) is a German professional footballer who plays as a midfielder for Regionalliga West club 1. FC Bocholt.

== Career ==
Budimbu made his professional debut for MSV Duisburg in the DFB-Pokal on 11 August 2019 in the home match against Greuther Fürth. After two years at Duisburg, he moved back to TSV Steinbach Haiger on 3 February 2021.

== Personal life ==
Born in Germany, Budimbu is of Congolese descent.

== Career statistics ==
As of 10 January 2021

Appearances and goals by club, season and competition
Club	Season	League		DFB-Pokal			Continental		Total	
Club	Season	Division	Apps	Goals	Apps	Goals	Apps	Goals	Apps	Goals
1. FC Köln II	2013–14	Regionalliga	14	0	—		—		14	0
1. FC Köln II	2014–15	Regionalliga	33	2	—		—		33	2
1. FC Köln II	2015–16	Regionalliga	17	1	—		—		17	1
1. FC Köln II	Total		64	3	—		—		64	3
Rot-Weiß Oberhausen	2015–16	Regionalliga	16	3	—		—		16	3
Rot-Weiß Oberhausen	2017–18	Regionalliga	33	8	—		—		33	8
Rot-Weiß Oberhausen	Total		49	11	—		—		49	11
Schalke 04 II	2017–18	Oberliga	30	8	—		—		30	8
TSV Steinbach Haiger	2018–19	Regionalliga	30	5	1	0	—		31	5
MSV Duisburg	2019–20	3. Liga	20	0	1	0	—		21	0
MSV Duisburg	2020–21	3. Liga	8	1	0	0	—		8	1
MSV Duisburg	Total		28	1	1	0	—		29	1
TSV Steinbach Haiger	2020–21	Regionalliga	0	0	—		—		0	0
Career total			201	28	2	0	—		203	28
