= Vincent Gembalies =

German footballer

Personal information
- Date of birth: 18 January 2000 (age 26)
- Place of birth: Oberhausen, Germany
- Height: 1.86 m (6 ft 1 in)
- Position: Centre-back

Team information
- Current team: SG Wattenscheid
- Number: 25

Youth career
- 2008–2019: MSV Duisburg

Senior career*
Years	Team	Apps	(Gls)
2019–2023	MSV Duisburg	68	(0)
2023–2024	SC Paderborn II	22	(0)
2024–2025	Wuppertaler SV	27	(1)
2026	Schwarz-Weiß Bregenz	8	(0)
2026–	SG Wattenscheid	8	(0)
- * Club domestic league appearances and goals as of 23 September 2026

Vincent Gembalies (born 18 January 2000) is a German professional footballer who plays as a centre-back for SG Wattenscheid.

== Career ==
Gembalies made his professional debut for MSV Duisburg in the 2. Bundesliga on 9 March 2019, coming on as a half-time substitute for Enis Hajri in the match against Jahn Regensburg, which finished as a 1–1 away draw. He extended his contract on 11 June 2019. Another three-year extension was signed in June 2021. In May 2023, it was announced that Gembalies will leave Duisburg. After the season he moved to SC Paderborn II.

== Career statistics ==
As of 14 May 2022

Appearances and goals by club, season and competition
Club	Season	Division	League		Cup		Continental		Total	
Club	Season	Division	Apps	Goals	Apps	Goals	Apps	Goals	Apps	Goals
MSV Duisburg	2018–19	2. Bundesliga	3	0	0	0	—		3	0
MSV Duisburg	2019–20	3. Liga	21	0	1	0	—		22	0
MSV Duisburg	2020–21	3. Liga	23	0	1	0	—		24	0
MSV Duisburg	2021–22	3. Liga	21	0	—		—		21	0
MSV Duisburg	2022–23	3. Liga	0	0	—		—		0	0
Career total			68	0	2	0	—		70	0
