= Joy-Slayd Mickels =

Rwandan footballer

Personal information
- Date of birth: 29 March 1994 (age 32)
- Place of birth: Siegburg, Germany
- Height: 1.85 m (6 ft 1 in)
- Positions: Forward; winger

Team information
- Current team: Karvan
- Number: 20

Youth career
- VSF Amern
- –2013: Borussia Mönchengladbach

Senior career*
| Years | Team | Apps | (Gls) |
| 2013–2014 | Borussia Mönchengladbach II | | |
| 2014–2015 | FC Aarau | 2 | (0) |
| 2016 | Strømmen IF | 8 | (1) |
| 2017–2018 | Alemannia Aachen | 25 | (8) |
| 2018–2019 | SV Rödinghausen | 18 | (2) |
| 2019–202 | Wegberg-Beeck | | |
| 2020–2021 | Germania Hilfarth | | |
| 2021–2025 | Ay-Yildizspor Hückelhoven | | |
| 2025 | SF Uevekoven | | |
| 2025– | Karvan | 17 | (4) |

International career^{‡}
| 2026– | Rwanda | 2 | (0) |
Medal record
Representing Rwanda
Men's football
FIFA Series
| Winner | 2026 Rwanda |
- * Club domestic league appearances and goals as of 22 June 2026 ‡ National team caps and goals as of 30 March 2026

Joy-Slayd Mickels (born 29 March 1994) is a professional footballer who plays as a forward or winger for Karvan. Born in Germany, he represents the Rwanda national team.

== Club career ==
In 2014, Mickels signed for FC Aarau in Switzerland after failing to make an appearance with German Bundesliga side Borussia Mönchengladbach. However, he was suspended for assault on two occasions in two different games there.

After playing in the Norwegian 1. divisjon for Strømmen IF he played for two fourth division clubs, Alemannia Aachen and SV Rödinghausen. In 2019 he signed for FC Wegberg-Beeck of the fifth-tier Mittelrheinliga.

On 11 August 2025, newly promoted Azerbaijan Premier League club Karvan announced the signing of Mickels to a one-year contract.

== International career ==
On 16 March 2026, Mickels was named in Rwanda's provisional 31-man squad for their 2026 FIFA Series matches against Grenada and then either Kenya or Estonia, alongside his twin-brother Joy-Lance and younger brother Leroy-Jacques.

== Personal life ==
Joy-Slade's twin brother Joy-Lance is also a professional footballer, as is their younger brother Leroy-Jacques (b. 1995). The three brothers, whose mother come from the DR Congo and father from Rwanda, played together at the under-19 level for Borussia Mönchengladbach.
