= Ahmet Engin =

German footballer (born 1996)

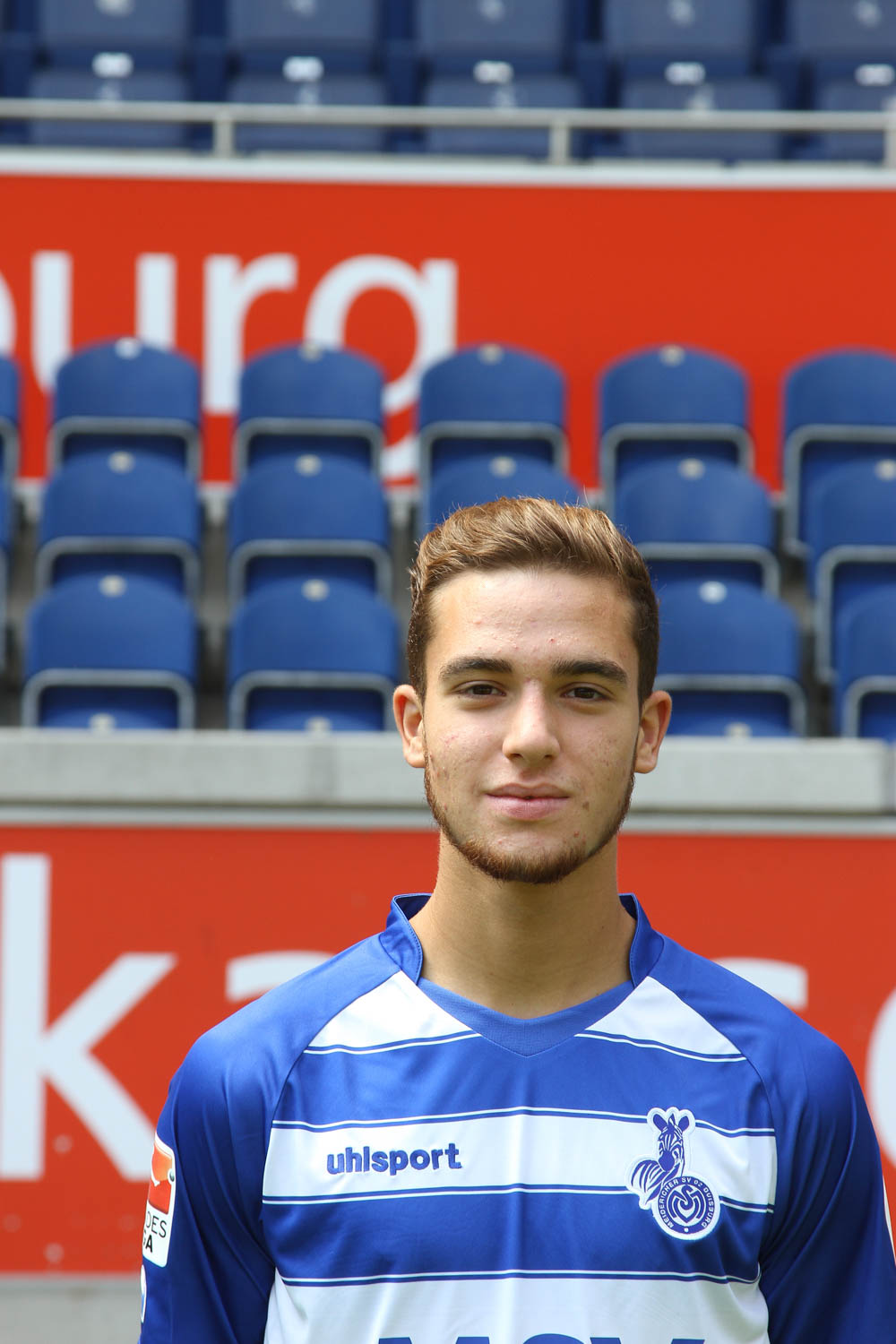
- Engin with MSV Duisburg in 2015

Personal information
- Full name: Ahmet Emin Engin
- Date of birth: 9 August 1996 (age 30)
- Place of birth: Moers, Germany
- Height: 1.80 m (5 ft 11 in)
- Position: Winger

Team information
- Current team: Muğlaspor
- Number: 28

Youth career
- SV Neukirchen
- –2011: KFC Uerdingen
- 2011–2015: MSV Duisburg

Senior career*
Years	Team	Apps	(Gls)
2015–2016	MSV Duisburg II	23	(6)
2015–2021	MSV Duisburg	137	(14)
2021–2023	Kasımpaşa	55	(3)
2023	Volos	8	(0)
2024	MSV Duisburg	18	(3)
2024–2026	Iğdır	62	(8)
2026–	Muğlaspor	10	(1)
- * Club domestic league appearances and goals as of 24 October 2026

Ahmet Emin Engin (born 9 August 1996) is a German-born Turkish professional footballer who plays as a winger for Turkish TFF 1. Lig club Muğlaspor.

== Career ==
Engin made his 2. Bundesliga debut for MSV Duisburg on 22 August 2015 against Karlsruher SC. On 26 May 2021, it was announced that he would leave Duisburg at the end of the 2020–21 season. He moved to Kasımpaşa afterwards.

In 2023 Engin joined Greek side Volos.

Engin returned to MSV Duisburg, fighting relegation from 3. Liga, in January 2024. After the season, he signed for Iğdır.

== Personal life ==
Engin was born in Germany and is of Turkish descent.

== Career statistics ==
As of match played 19 May 2024

Appearances and goals by club, season and competition
Club	Season	League			Cup		Continental		Total	
Club	Season	Division	Apps	Goals	Apps	Goals	Apps	Goals	Apps	Goals
MSV Duisburg II	2015–16	Oberliga Niederrhein	23	6	—		—		23	6
MSV Duisburg	2015–16	2. Bundesliga	1	0	0	0	—		1	0
MSV Duisburg	2016–17	3. Liga	29	1	0	0	—		29	1
MSV Duisburg	2017–18	2. Bundesliga	28	3	0	0	—		28	3
MSV Duisburg	2018–19	2. Bundesliga	28	1	3	0	—		31	1
MSV Duisburg	2019–20	3. Liga	23	5	0	0	—		23	5
MSV Duisburg	2020–21	3. Liga	28	4	1	0	—		29	4
MSV Duisburg	Total		137	14	4	0	—		141	14
Kasımpaşa	2021–22	Süper Lig	28	2	3	2	—		31	4
Kasımpaşa	2022–23	Süper Lig	27	1	3	0	—		30	1
Kasımpaşa	Total		55	3	6	2	—		61	5
Volos	2023–24	Super League Greece	8	0	2	0	—		10	0
MSV Duisburg	2023–24	3. Liga	18	3	—		—		18	3
Career total			241	26	12	2	—		253	28
