= Maximilian Jansen =

German footballer (born 1993)

Personal information
- Date of birth: 26 May 1993 (age 33)
- Place of birth: Datteln, Germany
- Height: 1.79 m (5 ft 10 in)
- Position: Midfielder

Team information
- Current team: 1. FC Bocholt
- Number: 6

Youth career
- –2008: Schalke 04
- 2008–2012: VfL Bochum

Senior career*
Years	Team	Apps	(Gls)
2011–2014	VfL Bochum II	77	(1)
2014–2016	Hallescher FC	57	(0)
2016–2019	SV Sandhausen	33	(0)
2019	Virton	1	(0)
2019–2021	MSV Duisburg	40	(1)
2021–2023	FSV Zwickau	50	(3)
2023–2025	FC 08 Homburg	49	(3)
2025–	1. FC Bocholt	10	(0)
- * Club domestic league appearances and goals as of 23 September 2026

Maximilian Jansen (born 26 May 1993) is a German professional footballer who plays as a midfielder for 1. FC Bocholt.

== Career ==
On 18 June 2019, Jansen joined R.E. Virton on a two-year contract with an option for one further year. However, he left the club again already at the end of August for personal reasons. He moved to MSV Duisburg on 2 September 2019. He left Duisburg at the end of the 2020–21 season. He joined FSV Zwickau on 31 August 2021.

== Career statistics ==
As of 22 May 2021

Appearances and goals by club, season and competition
Club	Season	Division	League		Cup		Continental		Total	
Club	Season	Division	Apps	Goals	Apps	Goals	Apps	Goals	Apps	Goals
VfL Bochum II	2011–12	Regionalliga	12	0	—		—		12	0
VfL Bochum II	2012–13	Regionalliga	34	0	—		—		34	0
VfL Bochum II	2013–14	Regionalliga	31	1	—		—		31	1
VfL Bochum II	Total		77	1	—		—		77	1
Hallescher FC	2014–15	3. Liga	36	0	—		—		36	0
Hallescher FC	2015–16	3. Liga	21	0	1	0	—		22	0
Hallescher FC	2016–17	3. Liga	0	0	—		—		0	0
Hallescher FC	Total		57	0	1	0	—		58	0
SV Sandhausen	2016–17	2. Bundesliga	0	0	—		—		0	0
SV Sandhausen	2017–18	2. Bundesliga	24	0	—		—		24	0
SV Sandhausen	2018–19	2. Bundesliga	9	0	2	0	—		11	0
SV Sandhausen	Total		33	0	2	0	—		35	0
Virton	2019–20	Belgian First Division B	1	0	—		—		1	0
MSV Duisburg	2019–20	3. Liga	23	1	1	0	—		24	1
MSV Duisburg	2020–21	3. Liga	17	0	1	0	—		18	0
MSV Duisburg	Total		40	1	2	0	—		42	1
Career total			208	2	5	0	—		213	2
