= Sinan Karweina =

German footballer (born 1999)

Personal information
- Date of birth: 29 March 1999 (age 27)
- Place of birth: Gummersbach, Germany
- Height: 1.72 m (5 ft 8 in)
- Position: Forward

Team information
- Current team: Wehen Wiesbaden
- Number: 30

Youth career
- –2014: FV Wiehl
- 2014–2018: 1. FC Köln

Senior career*
Years	Team	Apps	(Gls)
2017–2018	1. FC Köln II	2	(0)
2018–2019	Sportfreunde Lotte	24	(3)
2019–2021	MSV Duisburg	31	(4)
2021–2022	Türkgücü München	13	(2)
2022–2024	Austria Klagenfurt	47	(11)
2024–2026	FC Luzern	41	(4)
2026–	Wehen Wiesbaden	0	(0)
- * Club domestic league appearances and goals as of 26 May 2026

Sinan Karweina (born 29 March 1999) is a German professional footballer who plays as a forward for 3. Liga club Wehen Wiesbaden.

== Career ==
In June 2019, MSV Duisburg, newly relegated to the 3. Liga, announced the signing of Karweina on a two-year contract. Afterwards, he joined Türkgücü München for the 2021–22 season.

On 8 July 2022, Karweina signed a two-year contract with Austrian Bundesliga club Austria Klagenfurt, after his former club Türkgücü München had been relegated after filing for insolvency.

On 22 June 2024, he joined Swiss Super League side FC Luzern on a free transfer. He signed a deal for two years and will wear the number 10.

== Personal life ==
Born in Germany, Karweina is of Turkish descent and holds dual German-Turkish citizenship.

== Career statistics ==
As of 22 May 2021

Club	Season	Division	League		Cup		Continental		Total	
Club	Season	Division	Apps	Goals	Apps	Goals	Apps	Goals	Apps	Goals
1. FC Köln II	2017–18	Regionalliga	2	0	—		—		2	0
Sportfreunde Lotte	2018–19	3. Liga	24	3	—		—		24	3
MSV Duisburg	2019–20	3. Liga	12	3	1	0	—		13	3
MSV Duisburg	2020–21	3. Liga	19	1	1	0	—		20	1
MSV Duisburg	Total		31	4	2	0	—		33	4
Career total			57	7	2	0	—		59	7
