= Connor Krempicki =

German footballer

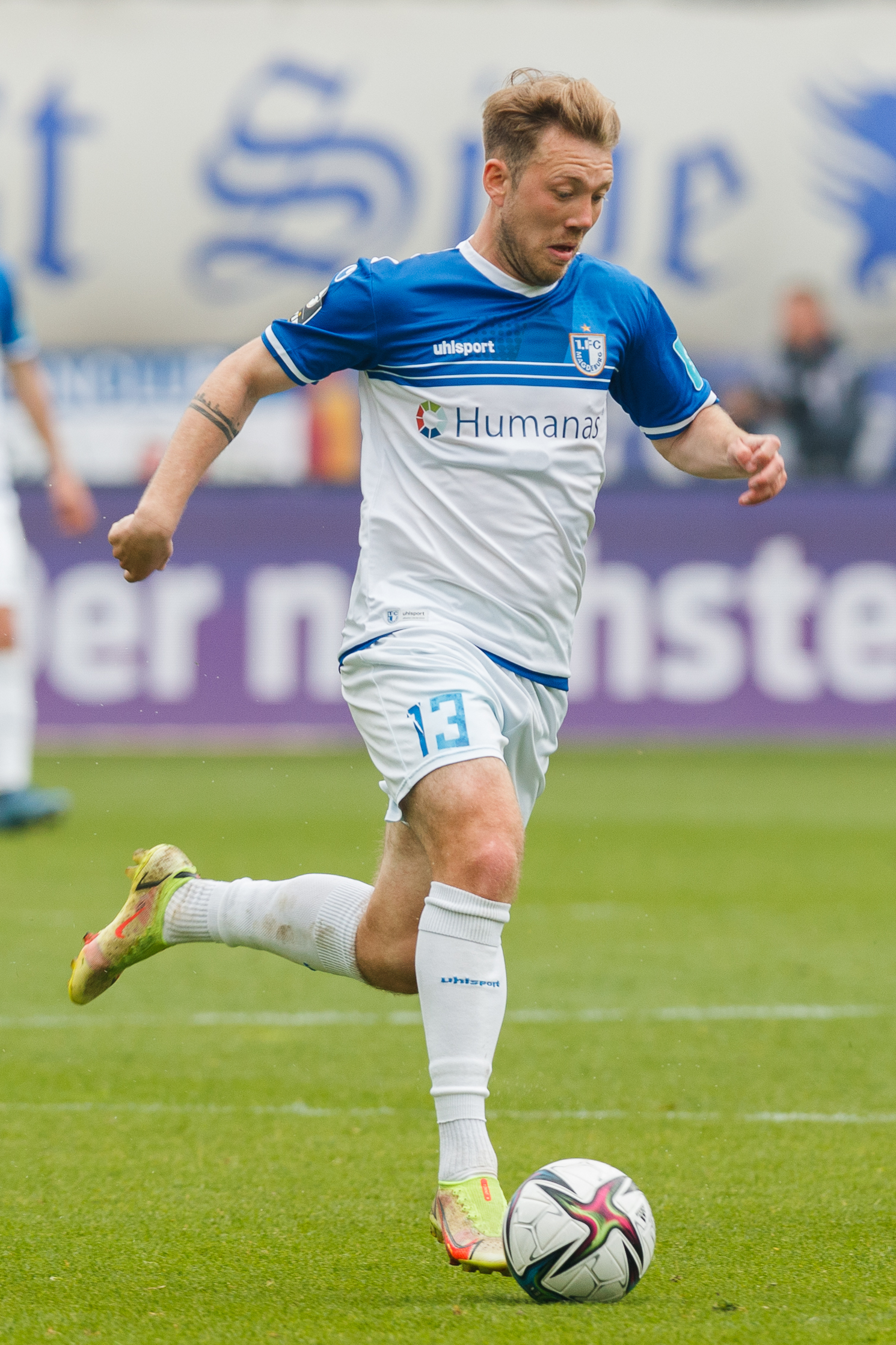
- Krempicki with 1. FC Magdeburg in 2022

Personal information
- Date of birth: 14 September 1994 (age 32)
- Place of birth: Gelsenkirchen, Germany
- Height: 1.78 m (5 ft 10 in)
- Position: Midfielder

Team information
- Current team: Borussia Dortmund II
- Number: 13

Youth career
- 1998–2003: SSV/FCA Rotthausen
- 2003–2013: Schalke 04

Senior career*
Years	Team	Apps	(Gls)
2013–2015	1899 Hoffenheim II	39	(1)
2015–2016	Viktoria Köln	17	(3)
2016–2017	Bonner SC	34	(8)
2017–2019	KFC Uerdingen	63	(7)
2019–2021	MSV Duisburg	47	(2)
2021–2026	1. FC Magdeburg	102	(12)
2026–	Borussia Dortmund II	9	(1)
- * Club domestic league appearances and goals as of 23 September 2026

Connor Krempicki (born 14 September 1994) is a German professional footballer who plays as a midfielder for Regionalliga West team Borussia Dortmund II.

== Career ==
=== MSV Duisburg ===
On 24 June 2019, Krempicki moved to MSV Duisburg. He made his debut on 20 July 2019 in a 4–1 win over Sonnenhof Großaspach. He extended his contract until the end of the 2020–21 season on 28 July 2020. On 26 May 2021, it was announced that he would leave Duisburg at the end of the 2020–21 season.

=== 1. FC Magdeburg ===
On 27 June 2021, Krempicki signed for 3. Liga side 1. FC Magdeburg.

Following Magdeburg's promotion to the 2. Bundesliga, Krempicki signed a contract extension with the club in May 2022.

== Personal life ==
Born in Germany, Krempicki is of Polish descent. He is the son of Jörg Krempicki, former manager of German lower-league side SV Horst 08, and his brother Gero also played for the club.

== Career statistics ==
As of 1 July 2022

Appearances and goals by club, season and competition
Club	Season	League			Cup		Continental		Total	
Club	Season	Division	Apps	Goals	Apps	Goals	Apps	Goals	Apps	Goals
1899 Hoffenheim II	2013–14	Regionalliga	19	1	—		—		19	1
1899 Hoffenheim II	2014–15	Regionalliga	20	0	—		—		20	0
1899 Hoffenheim II	Total		39	1	0	0	—		39	1
Viktoria Köln	2015–16	Regionalliga	17	3	0	0	—		17	3
Bonner SC	2016–17	Regionalliga	34	8	0	0	—		34	8
KFC Uerdingen	2017–18	Regionalliga	32	5	0	0	—		32	5
KFC Uerdingen	2018–19	3. Liga	31	2	0	0	—		31	2
KFC Uerdingen	Total		63	7	0	0	—		63	7
MSV Duisburg	2019–20	3. Liga	17	1	0	0	—		17	1
MSV Duisburg	2020–21	3. Liga	30	1	1	0	—		31	1
MSV Duisburg	Total		47	2	1	0	—		48	2
1. FC Magdeburg	2021–22	3. Liga	33	6	1	0	—		34	6
Career total			233	27	2	0	0	0	235	27
