= Rida El Barjiji =

Dutch footballer (born 2001)

Personal information
- Date of birth: 20 October 2001 (age 25)
- Place of birth: Almere, Netherlands
- Height: 1.83 m (6 ft 0 in)
- Position: Midfielder

Youth career
- 2012–2015: AFC
- 2015–2017: Almere City
- 2017–2018: AFC
- 2018–2019: Utrecht

Senior career*
| Years | Team | Apps | (Gls) |
| 2019–2022 | Jong Utrecht | 39 | (0) |
| 2022 | Smouha | 2 | (0) |
- * Club domestic league appearances and goals as of 6 May 2022

Rida El Barjiji (born 20 October 2001) is a Dutch professional footballer who plays as a midfielder.

== Career ==
El Barjiji progressed through the youth academy of FC Utrecht. Before that, he played in the youth departments of AFC and Almere City. On 10 August 2019, he made his debut for Jong FC Utrecht in the Eerste Divisie against Excelsior, coming on as a substitute in the 78th minute for Odysseus Velanas in the 2–0 defeat. He had a short spell at Egyptian side Smouha in 2022.

== Career statistics ==
=== Club ===
As of 19 February 2022.

Appearances and goals by club, season and competition
| Club | Season | League | | | Cup | | Continental | | Other | | Total | |
| Club | Season | Division | Apps | Goals | Apps | Goals | Apps | Goals | Apps | Goals | Apps | Goals |
|---|---|---|---|---|---|---|---|---|---|---|---|---|
| Jong Utrecht | 2019–20 | Eerste Divisie | 18 | 0 | — | | — | | — | | 18 | 0 |
| Jong Utrecht | 2020–21 | Eerste Divisie | 19 | 0 | — | | — | | — | | 19 | 0 |
| Jong Utrecht | 2021–22 | Eerste Divisie | 2 | 0 | — | | — | | — | | 2 | 0 |
| Career total | | | 39 | 0 | 0 | 0 | 0 | 0 | 0 | 0 | 39 | 0 |
