= Rafael García (footballer, born 1993) =

German footballer

Personal information
- Full name: Rafael García Doblas
- Date of birth: 27 September 1993 (age 33)
- Place of birth: Aachen, Germany
- Height: 1.81 m (5 ft 11 in)
- Position: Midfielder

Team information
- Current team: Fortuna Köln
- Number: 10

Youth career
- Borussia Brand
- Alemannia Aachen
- –2011: Germania Dürwiß

Senior career*
Years	Team	Apps	(Gls)
2011–2012	Germania Dürwiß	29	(2)
2012–2014	Alemannia Aachen II	25	(7)
2013–2015	Alemannia Aachen	63	(12)
2015–2016	Fortuna Düsseldorf II	32	(7)
2016–2018	Rot-Weiß Oberhausen	63	(10)
2018–2020	Chemnitzer FC	67	(10)
2020–2021	Waldhof Mannheim	37	(6)
2021–2024	Kickers Offenbach	72	(9)
2024–2025	1. FC Düren	24	(2)
2025–	Fortuna Köln	34	(3)
- * Club domestic league appearances and goals as of 18:20, 4 June 2026 (UTC)

Rafael García Doblas (born 27 September 1993) is a German professional footballer who plays as a midfielder for 3. Liga club Fortuna Köln.

== Career ==
On 26 July 2020, García joined SV Waldhof Mannheim. He agreed the termination of his contract on 30 August 2021.

== Honours ==
Rot-Weiß Oberhausen

- Lower Rhine Cup: 2017–18

Chemnitzer FC

- Saxony Cup: 2018–19

Fortuna Köln

- Regionalliga West: 2025–26
