= Matthias Rahn =

German footballer (born 1990)

Personal information
- Date of birth: 17 May 1990 (age 36)
- Place of birth: Bad Langensalza, East Germany
- Height: 1.95 m (6 ft 5 in)
- Position: Centre-back

Youth career
- FSV Hersleben
- TSV Bad Tennstedt
- –2009: Rot-Weiß Erfurt

Senior career*
Years	Team	Apps	(Gls)
2009–2012	Rot-Weiß Erfurt II	73	(7)
2011–2012	Rot-Weiß Erfurt	11	(0)
2012–2014	Hessen Kassel	65	(2)
2014–2019	Sportfreunde Lotte	131	(4)
2015–2016	→ Wacker Burghausen (loan)	2	(0)
2020	MSV Duisburg	9	(0)
2020–2022	Energie Cottbus	12	(0)
- * Club domestic league appearances and goals

Matthias Rahn (born 17 May 1990) is a German former footballer who played as a centre-back.

== Career ==
He joined MSV Duisburg on 4 January 2020. After the end of the 2019–20 season, he left Duisburg. He afterwards signed for Energie Cottbus.

== Career statistics ==
As of 23 June 2020

Appearances and goals by club, season and competition
Club	Season	Division	League		Cup		Continental		Total	
Club	Season	Division	Apps	Goals	Apps	Goals	Apps	Goals	Apps	Goals
Rot-Weiß Erfurt	2011–12	3. Liga	11	0	—		—		11	0
Hessen Kassel	2012–13	Regionalliga	37	1	—		—		37	1
Hessen Kassel	2013–14	Regionalliga	28	1	—		—		28	1
Hessen Kassel	Total		65	2	—		—		65	2
Sportfreunde Lotte	2014–15	Regionalliga	21	0	—		—		21	0
Sportfreunde Lotte	2015–16	Regionalliga	35	1	—		—		35	1
Sportfreunde Lotte	2016–17	3. Liga	20	0	4	0	—		24	0
Sportfreunde Lotte	2017–18	3. Liga	14	0	—		—		14	0
Sportfreunde Lotte	2018–19	3. Liga	32	3	—		—		32	3
Sportfreunde Lotte	2019–20	Regionalliga	9	0	—		—		9	0
Sportfreunde Lotte	Total		131	4	—		—		135	4
Wacker Burghausen (loan)	2015–16	Regionalliga	2	0	—		—		2	0
MSV Duisburg	2019–20	3. Liga	9	0	—		—		9	0
Energie Cottbus	2020–21	Regionalliga	0	0	—		—		0	0
Career total			218	6	4	0	—		222	6
