= Yassin Ben Balla =

French footballer (born 1996)

Personal information
- Date of birth: 24 February 1996 (age 30)
- Place of birth: Valenciennes, France
- Height: 1.80 m (5 ft 11 in)
- Position: Midfielder

Team information
- Current team: Schalke 04 II
- Number: 25

Youth career
- –2014: Lens

Senior career*
| Years | Team | Apps | (Gls) |
| 2014–2015 | Amiens B | 11 | (0) |
| 2015–2016 | FC Zürich II | 18 | (1) |
| 2017–2019 | Rot-Weiß Oberhausen | 72 | (13) |
| 2019–2020 | MSV Duisburg | 33 | (2) |
| 2020–2021 | Eintracht Braunschweig | 28 | (2) |
| 2021–2022 | FC Ingolstadt | 0 | (0) |
| 2022–2023 | Darmstadt 98 | 13 | (0) |
| 2023–2024 | SV Sandhausen | 32 | (3) |
| 2024– | Schalke 04 II | 60 | (23) |
| 2025 | Schalke 04 | 1 | (1) |
- * Club domestic league appearances and goals as of 23 September 2026

Yassin Ben Balla (born 24 February 1996) is a French professional footballer who plays as a midfielder for Regionalliga club Schalke 04 II.

== Career ==
Ben Balla moved to MSV Duisburg on 19 June 2019. He made his professional debut for MSV Duisburg in the 3. Liga on 20 July 2019, starting in the home match against Sonnenhof Großaspach.

He moved to Eintracht Braunschweig for the 2020–21 season.

On 2 July 2022, Ben Balla signed a one-year contract with Darmstadt 98.

On 15 November 2024, Ben Balla joined Schalke 04 II. He made his first team debut for Schalke 04 in the 2. Bundesliga in a 2–1 defeat against SV Elversberg on 18 May 2025, where he came on as a substitute in the 58th minute and scored the only goal for Schalke in the 85th minute.

== Personal life ==
Born in France, Ben Balla is of Moroccan descent.

== Career statistics ==
As of match played 16 May 2026

Appearances and goals by club, season and competition
| Club | Season | League | | | DFB-Pokal | | Total | |
| Club | Season | Division | Apps | Goals | Apps | Goals | Apps | Goals |
|---|---|---|---|---|---|---|---|---|
| Amiens B | 2014–15 | Championnat National 3 | 11 | 0 | — | | 11 | 0 |
| FC Zürich II | 2015–16 | Swiss Promotion League | 18 | 1 | — | | 18 | 1 |
| Rot-Weiß Oberhausen | 2016–17 | Regionalliga West | 8 | 2 | — | | 8 | 2 |
| Rot-Weiß Oberhausen | 2017–18 | Regionalliga West | 30 | 4 | — | | 30 | 4 |
| Rot-Weiß Oberhausen | 2018–19 | Regionalliga West | 34 | 7 | 1 | 0 | 35 | 7 |
| Rot-Weiß Oberhausen | Total | | 72 | 13 | 1 | 0 | 73 | 13 |
| MSV Duisburg | 2019–20 | 3. Liga | 33 | 2 | 1 | 0 | 34 | 2 |
| Eintracht Braunschweig | 2020–21 | 2. Bundesliga | 28 | 2 | 2 | 0 | 30 | 2 |
| FC Ingolstadt | 2021–22 | 2. Bundesliga | 0 | 0 | 0 | 0 | 0 | 0 |
| Darmstadt 98 | 2022–23 | 2. Bundesliga | 13 | 0 | 2 | 0 | 15 | 0 |
| SV Sandhausen | 2023–24 | 3. Liga | 32 | 3 | 2 | 1 | 34 | 4 |
| Schalke 04 II | 2024–25 | Regionalliga West | 17 | 5 | — | | 17 | 5 |
| Schalke 04 II | 2025–26 | Regionalliga West | 34 | 15 | — | | 34 | 15 |
| Schalke 04 II | 2026–27 | Regionalliga West | 0 | 0 | — | | 0 | 0 |
| Schalke 04 II | Total | | 51 | 20 | — | | 51 | 20 |
| Schalke 04 | 2024–25 | 2. Bundesliga | 1 | 1 | — | | 1 | 1 |
| Career total | | | 259 | 42 | 8 | 1 | 267 | 43 |
