= Lukas Boeder =

German footballer

Personal information
- Date of birth: 18 April 1997 (age 29)
- Place of birth: Essen, Germany
- Height: 1.84 m (6 ft 0 in)
- Position: Defender

Team information
- Current team: Dynamo Dresden
- Number: 29

Youth career
- –2003: SV Kupferdreh
- 2003–2006: SV Burgaltendorf
- 2006–2012: Schalke 04
- 2012–2016: Bayer Leverkusen

Senior career*
Years	Team	Apps	(Gls)
2015–2017	Bayer Leverkusen	0	(0)
2017	→ SC Paderborn (loan)	11	(0)
2017–2019	SC Paderborn	43	(1)
2019–2020	MSV Duisburg	34	(0)
2020–2021	Hallescher FC	31	(0)
2021–2024	1. FC Saarbrücken	88	(3)
2024–	Dynamo Dresden	56	(1)

International career
2012	Germany U15	1	(0)
2012–2013	Germany U16	8	(0)
2013–2014	Germany U17	12	(0)
2015	Germany U18	2	(0)
2015–2016	Germany U19	9	(0)
- * Club domestic league appearances and goals as of 18 May 2026

Lukas Boeder (born 18 April 1997) is a German professional footballer who plays as a defender for 2. Bundesliga side Dynamo Dresden.

== Career ==
In 2017, after having been on loan previously, Boeder joined SC Paderborn on a permanent transfer signing a two-year contract until 2019. For the 2019–20 season, he joined MSV Duisburg. He left Duisburg at the end of the season. He joined Hallescher FC on a one-year contract on 26 August 2020.

On 11 June 2024, Boeder signed with Dynamo Dresden in 3. Liga.

== Career statistics ==
As of 4 July 2020

Appearances and goals by club, season and competition
Club	Season	Division	League		Cup		Continental		Total	
Club	Season	Division	Apps	Goals	Apps	Goals	Apps	Goals	Apps	Goals
SC Paderborn	2016–17	3. Liga	11	0	—		—		11	0
SC Paderborn	2017–18	3. Liga	36	0	4	0	—		40	0
SC Paderborn	2018–19	2. Bundesliga	7	1	—		—		7	1
SC Paderborn	Total		54	1	4	0	—		58	1
MSV Duisburg	2019–20	3. Liga	34	0	2	0	—		36	0
Hallescher FC	2020–21	3. Liga	0	0	—		—		0	0
Career total			88	1	6	0	—		94	1
