= Migel Schmeling =

German footballer

Personal information
- Full name: Migel-Max Schmeling
- Date of birth: 17 February 2000 (age 26)
- Place of birth: Gelsenkirchen, Germany
- Height: 1.80 m (5 ft 11 in)
- Position: Left-back

Team information
- Current team: TuS Bövinghausen
- Number: 11

Youth career
- –2019: MSV Duisburg

Senior career*
| Years | Team | Apps | (Gls) |
| 2019–2020 | MSV Duisburg | 8 | (0) |
| 2020–2021 | Borussia Dortmund II | 5 | (0) |
| 2021 | SC Verl | 0 | (0) |
| 2021– | TuS Bövinghausen | 46 | (1) |
- * Club domestic league appearances and goals as of 12 November 2022

Migel-Max Schmeling (born 17 February 2000) is a German footballer who plays as a left-back for TuS Bövinghausen.

== Career ==
Schmeling made his professional debut for MSV Duisburg in the DFB-Pokal on 11 August 2019 in the home match against Greuther Fürth. His starting debut came on 21 September 2019, in a 2–1 win against 1860 Munich. He left Duisburg at the end of the 2019–20 season.

On 8 July 2020, he signed with Borussia Dortmund II.

In June 2021, he signed for SC Verl of the 3. Liga. He agreed the termination of his contract in August due to a "family incident" which required his attention and which was incompatible with playing professionally.

== Career statistics ==
As of 4 August 2021

Appearances and goals by club, season and competition
| Club | Season | Division | League | | Cup | | Other | | Total | |
| Club | Season | Division | Apps | Goals | Apps | Goals | Apps | Goals | Apps | Goals |
|---|---|---|---|---|---|---|---|---|---|---|
| MSV Duisburg | 2019–20 | 3. Liga | 8 | 0 | 1 | 0 | — | | 9 | 0 |
| Borussia Dortmund II | 2020–21 | Regionalliga | 5 | 0 | — | | — | | 5 | 0 |
| SC Verl | 2021–22 | 3. Liga | 0 | 0 | — | | — | | 0 | 0 |
| Career total | | | 13 | 0 | 1 | 0 | — | | 14 | 0 |
